= China Manned Space Program =

Spaceflight programme in China

- 中国载人航天工程; Zhōngguó Zàirén Hángtiān Gōngchéng
- China Manned Space (CMS) Program logo which forms the shape of a space station and the character "中" in "中国" (China)

Program overview
- Country: China
- Organization: China Manned Space Agency
- Purpose: Human spaceflight
- Status: Active

Program history
- Duration: 21 September 1992 – present
- First flight: Shenzhou 1; 19 November 1999; 26 years ago
- First crewed flight: Shenzhou 5; 15 October 2003; 22 years ago
- Last flight: Shenzhou 23; 24 May 2026; 4 months ago (most recent)
- Successes: 37
- Partial failures: 1
- Launch site: Jiuquan · Wenchang

Vehicle information
- Uncrewed vehicle: Tianzhou
- Crewed vehicle: Shenzhou
- Crew capacity: 3
- Launch vehicle(s): Long March 2F; Long March 7 Long March 5B

The China Manned Space Program (CMS; Chinese: 中国载人航天工程; pinyin: Zhōngguó Zàirén Hángtiān Gōngchéng), also known as Project 921 (Chinese: 九二一工程; pinyin: Jiǔèryī Gōngchéng) is a space program developed by the People's Republic of China and run by the China Manned Space Agency (CMSA) under the Equipment Development Department of the Central Military Commission, designed to develop and enhance human spaceflight capabilities for China. As of 2026, China has conducted 16 crewed spaceflight launches, all using the Shenzhou spacecraft atop the Long March 2F rocket, the most recent being Shenzhou 23.

Approved on 21 September 1992, Wang Yongzhi served as its first chief designer until 2006. The current chief designer is Zhou Jianping. CMSA is headed by the director of the Equipment Development Department, currently General Xu Xueqiang.

CMS was divided into "three steps":

1. Development of a crewed spacecraft to establish basic human spaceflight capabilities (Shenzhou 1–6)
2. Development of spacewalk equipment and techniques, along with the launch of space laboratories to support short-duration crewed missions and the development of rendezvous and docking techniques (Shenzhou 7–11)
3. Development of a modular space station station to support long-duration crewed space operations (Shenzhou 12–15)

CMS achieved all three steps, with Shenzhou 5 in 2003, Shenzhou 9 docking with Tiangong-1 in 2012, and the assembly of the Tiangong space station by 2022. China thus became the third nation to achieve human spaceflight and operate a space station (after the Soviet Union/Russia and the United States). The CMSA has planned crewed lunar missions from 2030 under the Chinese Lunar Exploration Program, set to use the Mengzhou orbiter and Lanyue lander, atop the Long March 10.

== History ==
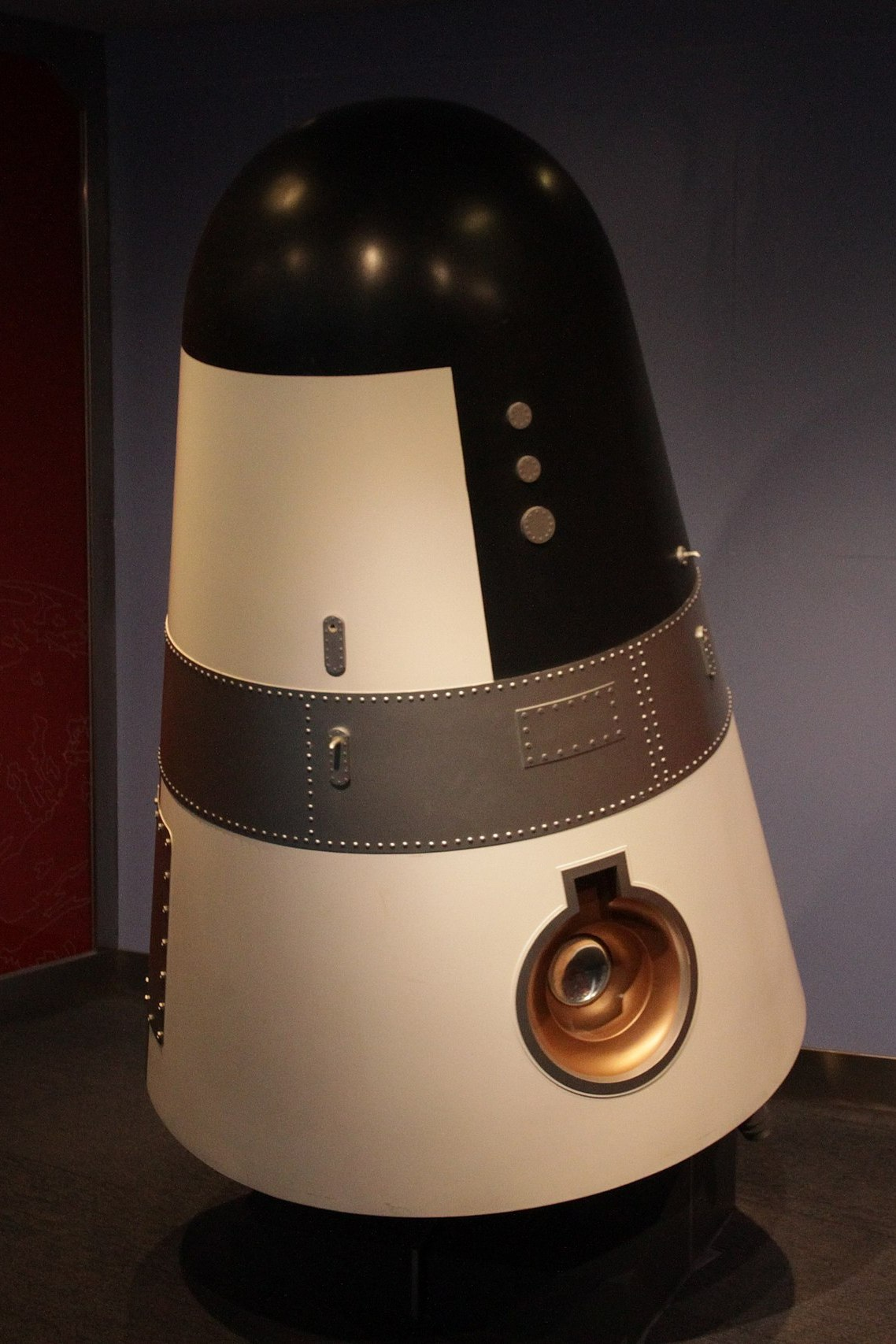
Mockup of FSW satellite

Formal research of China's human spaceflight began in 1968. An institute for medical and space engineering was founded in Beijing. It was the predecessor of The China Astronaut Research and Training Center, at which China's astronauts were trained in the following decades. Before that, in 1964, China launched a sounding rocket, carrying several small animals to an altitude of 70 km as an attempt to study the effects of spaceflight on living creatures.

On 24 April 1970, China launched its first satellite, Dong Fang Hong I into orbit. In 1970, Qian Xuesen, the father of China's space program, introduced his human spaceflight project, which was later called Project 714. An early version of a crewed spacecraft called Shuguang I was under research. However, this program was cancelled due to a lack of funds and political interest. Instead, China decided in 1978 to pursue a method of sending astronauts into space using the more familiar FSW-derived ballistic reentry capsules. Two years later. in 1980, the Chinese government cancelled the program citing cost concerns.

In order to gain relative experience, China launched and recovered its first recoverable satellite, Fanhui Shi Weixing, on 26 November 1975. The success of the mission demonstrated China's capabilities of controlled atmospheric entry.

In 1986, the 863 Program was funded by the Chinese government. It was intended to stimulate the development of science and technologies in several key areas, in which space capabilities were included.

The Chinese human spaceflight program, formally titled the China Manned Space Program, was formally approved on September 21, 1992, by the Standing Committee of Politburo as Project 921, with work beginning on 1 January 1993. The initial plan has three steps:

1. First Step: Launch a crewed spaceship with the aim of building up the fundamental capability in human space exploration and space experiments.
2. Second Step: Launch a space laboratory tasked with making technological breakthroughs for extravehicular activities, space rendezvous and spacecraft docking procedures, as well as providing a solution for man-tended space utilization on a certain scale and short-term basis.
3. Third Step: Establish a Space Station with the aim of providing a solution for human-tended -space utilization on a larger scale and longer-term basis.

The program was led by a chief commander and a chief designer, who handled administrative and technical issues respectively. A joint meeting between these two was responsible for making decisions on important issues during the implementation of the project. The first chief designer of the program was Wang Yongzhi. A new organization, China Manned Space Agency (CMSA) under the Equipment Development Department of the Central Military Commission, was founded for the administration of the program.

In 1994, China signed a cooperation agreement with Russia to purchase aerospace technologies. In 1995, a deal was signed between the two countries for the transfer of Russian Soyuz spacecraft technology to China. Included in the agreement were schedules for astronaut training, provision of Soyuz capsules, life support systems, docking systems, and space suits. In 1996, two Chinese astronauts, Wu Jie and Li Qinglong, began training at the Yuri Gagarin Cosmonaut Training Center in Russia. After training, these men returned to China and proceeded to train other Chinese astronauts at sites near Beijing and Jiuquan.

The hardware and know-how purchased from Russia led to modifications of the original Step One spacecraft, later known called Shenzhou, roughly translated as "divine vessel". New launch facilities were built at the Jiuquan launch site in Inner Mongolia, and in the spring of 1998, a mock-up of the Long March 2F launch vehicle with Shenzhou spacecraft was rolled out for integration and facility tests.

== Development ==
=== First Step ===
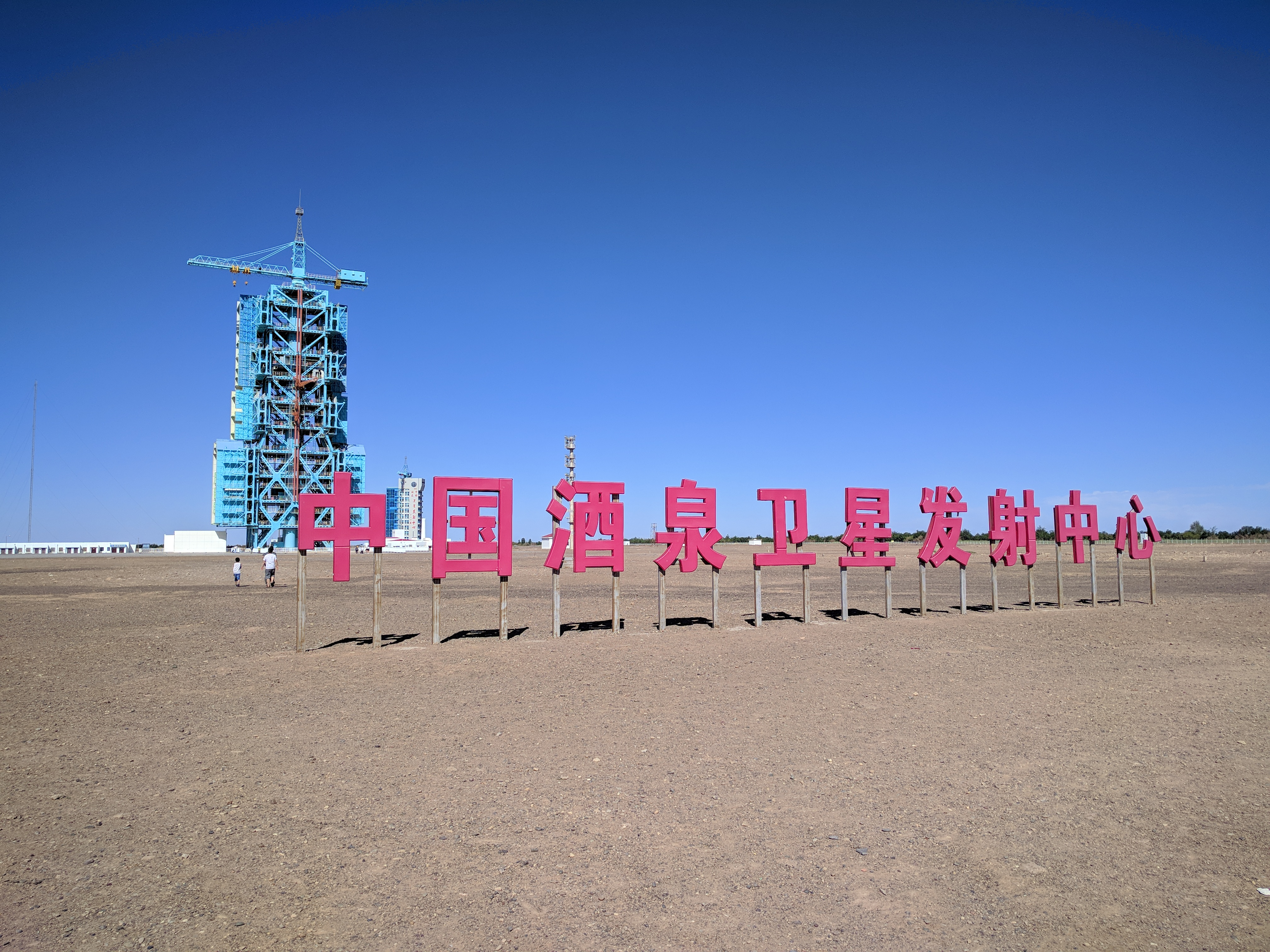
Launch pad dedicated to CMS launches in Jiuquan Satellite Launch Center

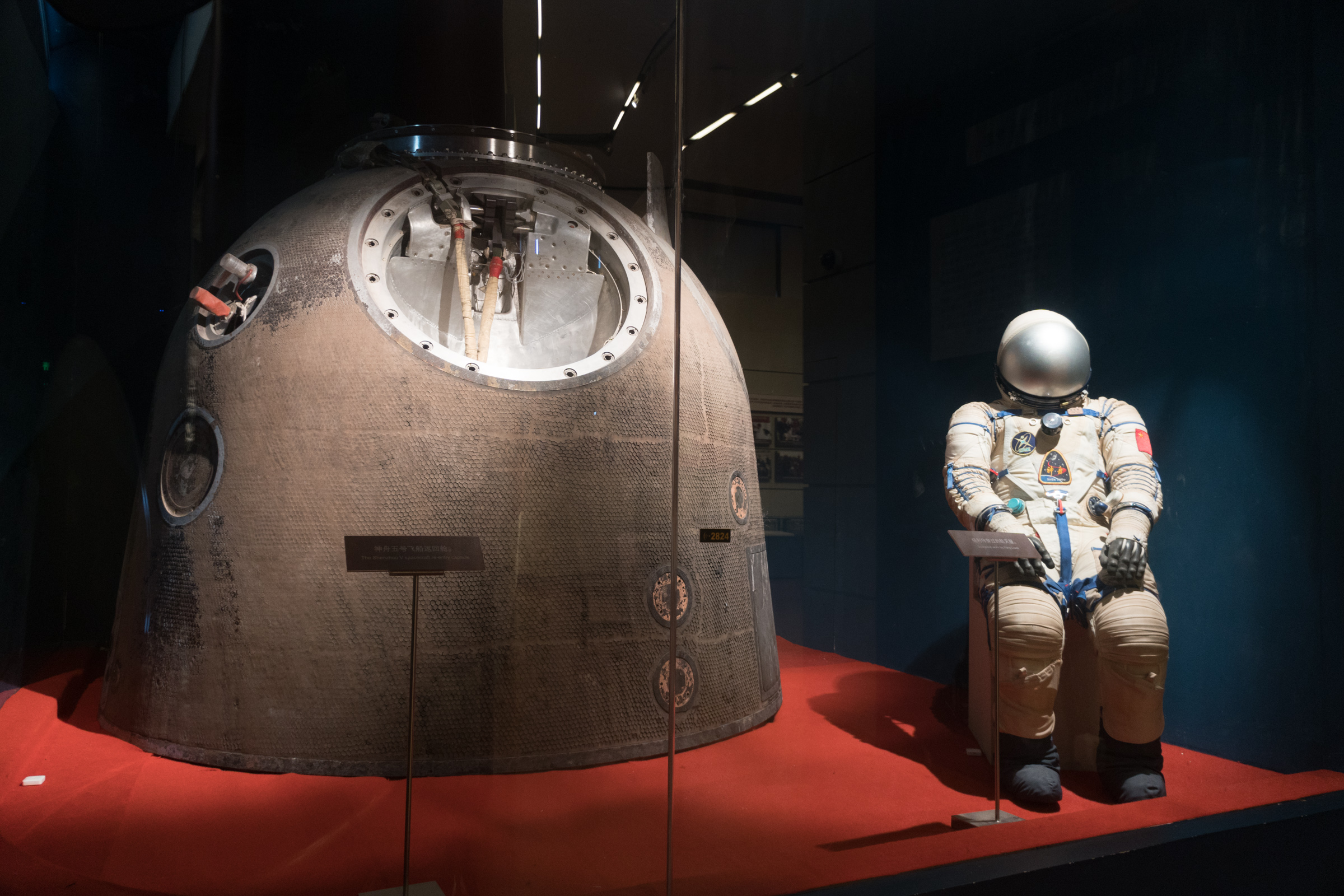
Shenzhou 5 return capsule and space suit displayed in the National Museum of China.

The "first step" of the China Manned Space Program was to establish basic human spaceflight capabilities, specifically a human-rated launch vehicle and a crewed spacecraft.

The development of Long March 2F, China's first human-rated launch vehicle, began in September 1992. It was derived from the Long March 2E, but with a launch escape system and control system redundancy.

In December 1994, the first hot test fire of a human-rated rocket's engine was completed successfully.

In 1996, two pilots from the Air Force, Wu Jie and Li Qinglong, were handpicked and sent to Russia for training at the Yuri Gagarin Cosmonaut Training Centre.

In January 1998, 14 pilots were selected as the first batch of Chinese astronaut candidates.

In November 1998, a new flight control center, Beijing Aerospace Flight Control Center, was opened to support CMS missions. Also in that year, a new launch complex adapting the advanced "three verticals" (vertical assembly, vertical testing and vertical transport) strategy was put into service in Jiuquan Satellite Launch Center to support CMS missions exclusively.

On 19 November 1999, Shenzhou 1, the first uncrewed Shenzhou spacecraft, was launched from Jiuquan Satellite Launch Center and entered predetermined orbit. The ground electrical test model was used during this test flight to meet the deadline by the end of 1999. The return capsule of the spacecraft successfully separated with other parts and landed intact in Inner Mongolia the next day. Despite only limited systems being tested, the mission was still a successful test flight for the Shenzhou spacecraft and Long March 2F rocket.

The second test flight of Shenzhou occurred on 10 January 2001. Shenzhou 2, the first formal uncrewed spaceship of China, was launched into orbit and stayed for seven days before the return capsule separated. However, the parachutes failed to open upon re-entry, which resulted in hard-landing.

In 2002, China launched Shenzhou 3 and Shenzhou 4; both ended in success.

The fifth launch, Shenzhou 5, was the first to carry a human (Yang Liwei) and occurred at 01:00:00 UTC on 15 October 2003. At 587 seconds after taking off, the spaceship separated from the rocket and entered an elliptical orbit with an inclination of 42.4°, the perigee height of 199.14 km and the apogee height of 347.8 km. Yang became the first Chinese launched into space with Chinese launch vehicle and spacecraft. At 22:23 UTC on 15 October 2003, the re-entry module landed safely in central Inner Mongolia. The whole mission lasted for 21 hours and 23 minutes, making China the third country capable of sending humans to space and back independently, after Russia and the United States.

The first "multi-person and multi-day" crewed space flight, Shenzhou 6, was conducted during 12–17 October 2005. Astronauts Fei Junlong and Nie Haisheng spent more than 4 days in space and orbited the Earth for 76 orbits.

=== Second Step ===
The "second step" of the China Manned Space Program was the development of spacewalk equipment and techniques, along with the launch of space laboratories to support short-duration crewed missions and the development of rendezvous and docking techniques.

==== Phase 1: EVA, space rendezvous and docking ====
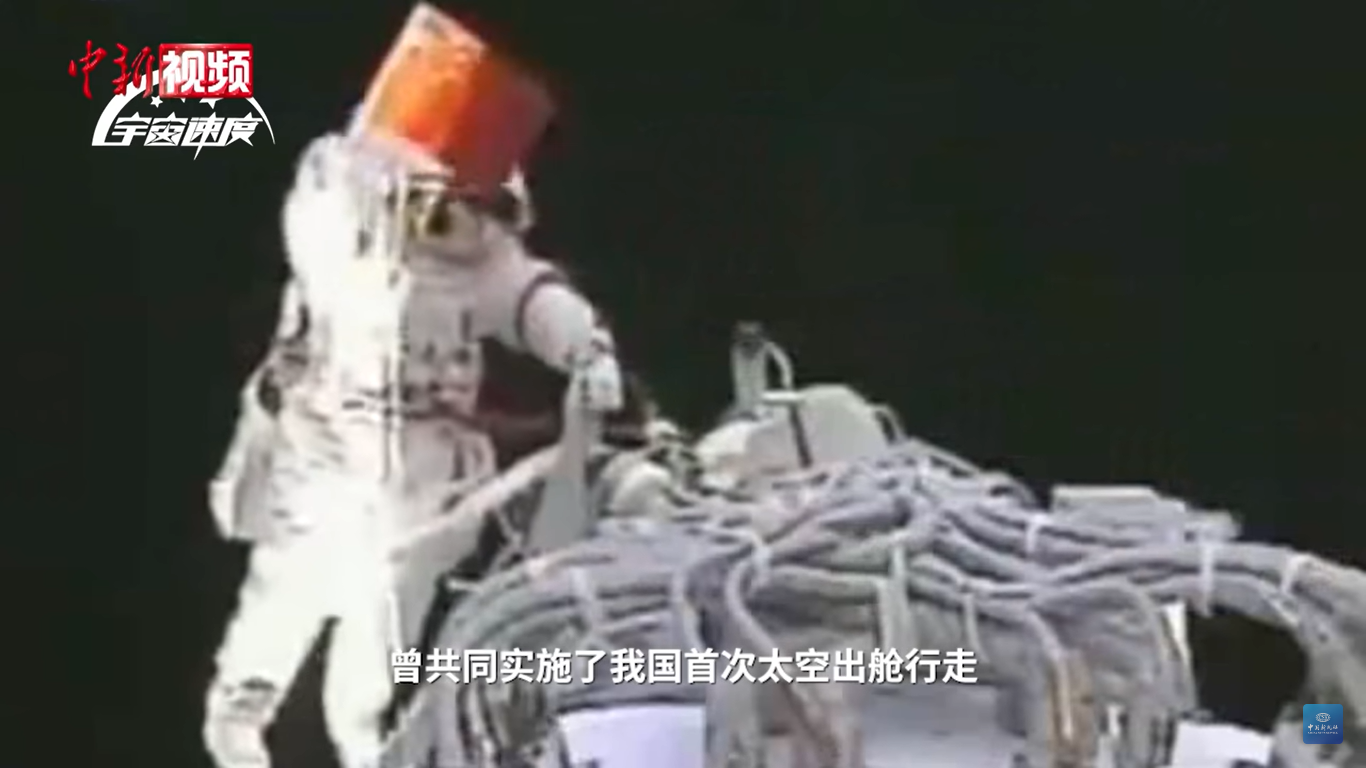
First spacewalk by Chinese astronaut during Shenzhou 7 mission

On 25 September 2008, Shenzhou 7 was launched into space with three astronauts, Zhai Zhigang, Liu Boming and Jing Haipeng. During the flight, Zhai Zhigang and Liu Boming completed China's first EVA with the Feitian extravehicular space suit made in China and the Sea Hawk extravehicular space suit imported from Russia respectively.

In order to practice space rendezvous and docking, China launched an 8,000 kg (18,000 lb) target vehicle, Tiangong 1, in 2011 with a variant of Long March 2F, followed by Shenzhou 8, the first uncrewed Shenzhou spacecraft since Shenzhou 5. The two spacecraft performed China's first automatic rendezvous and docking on 3 November 2011, which verified the performance of docking procedures and mechanisms. About 9 months later, Tiangong 1 completed the first manual rendezvous and docking with Shenzhou 9, a crewed spacecraft carrying Jing Haipeng, Liu Wang and China's first female astronaut Liu Yang.

On 11 June 2013, crewed spacecraft Shenzhou 10 carrying astronauts Nie Haisheng, Zhang Xiaoguang and Wang Yaping was launched into orbit and docked with Tiangong 1. The three astronauts spent 12 days in Tiangong 1 by conducting scientific experiments, giving lectures to over 60 million students in China, and performing more docking tests before returning to Earth safely. The completion of the missions from Shenzhou 6 to Shenzhou 10 demonstrated China's technical advancement in human spaceflight, ending phase 1 of the Second Step.

==== Phase 2: Space laboratory ====
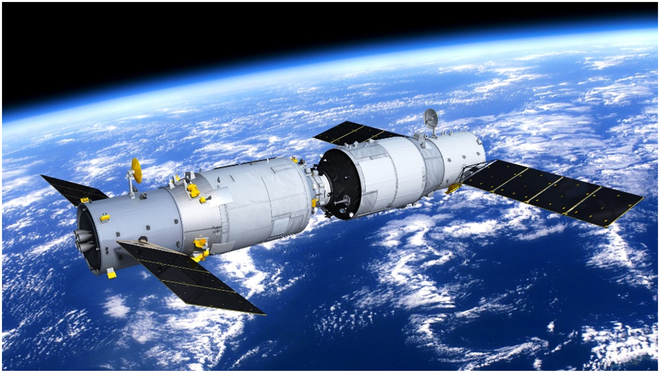
Rendering of Tianzhou-1 cargo spacecraft (left) and Tiangong-2 Space Laboratory (right) assembly in space

To further enhance China's human spaceflight capabilities and make preparation for the construction of future space station, China launched the second phase of the Second Step, which consisted of four space laboratory missions.

In June 2016, China conducted the maiden flight of Long March 7, a new generation medium-lift launch vehicle with higher payload capability to low Earth orbit, from the newly built Wenchang Space Launch Site located in the coastal Hainan Province.

In September 2016, Tiangong 2 was launched into orbit. It was a space laboratory with more advanced functions and equipment than Tiangong 1. A month later, Shenzhou 11 was launched and docked with Tiangong 2. Two astronauts, Jing Haipeng and Chen Dong entered Tiangong 2 and were stationed for about 30 days, breaking China's record for the longest human spaceflight mission while verifying the viability of astronauts' medium-term stay in space.

In April 2017, China's first cargo spacecraft, Tianzhou 1 docked with Tiangong 2 and completed multiple in-orbit propellant refueling tests, which marked the successful completion of the Second Step of CMS.

=== Third Step ===
The "third step" of the China Manned Space Program was to develop a modular space station station to support long-duration crewed space operations

==== Phase 1: demonstration of key technologies ====
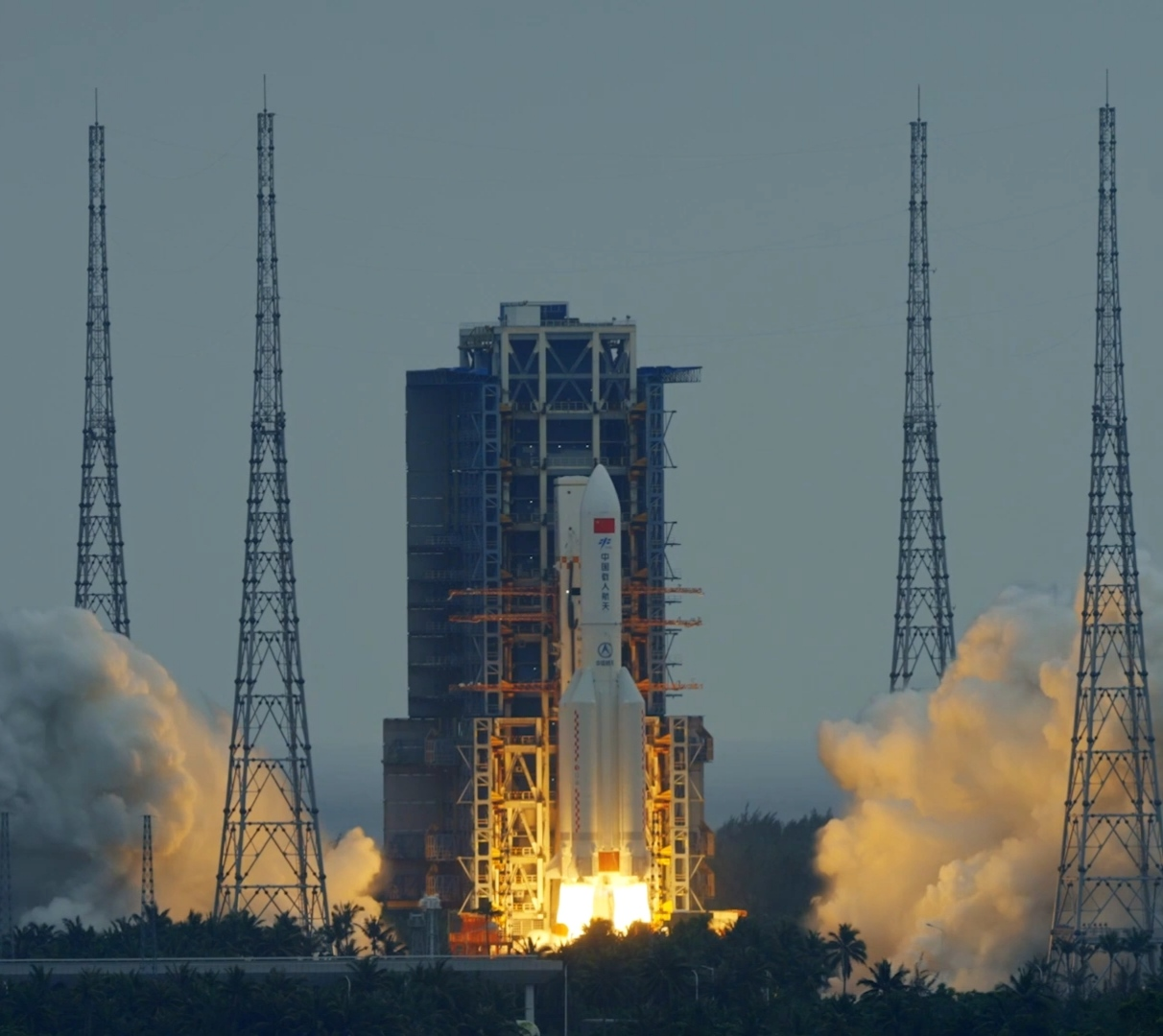
Launch of Tianhe core module on 29 April 2021

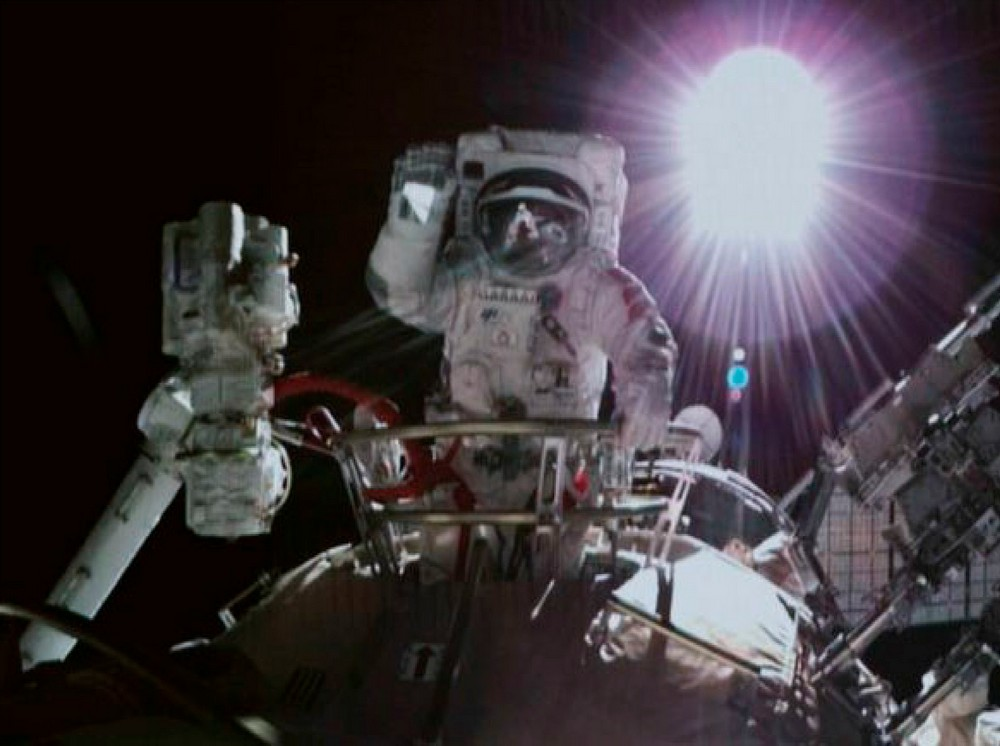
Astronaut Zhai Zhigang of Shenzhou 13 crew performing spacewalk on Tiangong Space Station on 7 November 2021

On 5 May 2020, China successfully launched the maiden flight of Long March 5B, whose payload capability was greater than 22,000 kg (49,000 lb), allowing China to put a large space station module into low Earth orbit.

On 29 April 2021, the second Long March 5B rocket lifted off from Wenchang, carrying the 22,500 kg (49,600 lb) Tianhe core module, the most complex spacecraft independently developed by China. The core module entered the predetermined orbit about 494 seconds after launch, marking the start of the in-orbit construction of China's space station.

On 29 May 2021, Tianzhou 2, the first cargo spacecraft to the space station, was launched by a Long March 7 rocket and docked with Tianhe core module 8 hours later. The shipment included astronaut supplies, space station equipment, extravehicular space suits and propellant.

The first crewed mission to Tianhe, Shenzhou 12, was launched from Jiuquan Satellite Launch Center on 17 June 2021. The spacecraft conducted China's first crewed autonomous rapid rendezvous and docking 6 hours 32 minutes after launch. Three crew members, Nie Haisheng, Liu Boming and Tang Hongbo, became the first inhabitants of Tiangong Space Station.

At 00:11 UTC on 4 July 2021, two of the Shenzhou 12 crew members, Liu Boming and Tang Hongbo, conducted the first EVA on the space station, which lasted for 6 hours 46 minutes, breaking the previous 20-minute EVA record made during Shenzhou 7 mission in 2008 by a huge margin.

The Shenzhou 12 crew returned to Earth safely on 17 September 2021.

On 20 September 2021, Tianzhou 3 cargo spacecraft was launched to Tiangong Space Station.

On 15 October 2021, Shenzhou 13 was launched and docked with the Tianhe core module 6.5 hours later. The plan was for the crew, including Zhai Zhigang, Wang Yaping and Ye Guangfu, to complete a six-month stay, the longest one since the beginning of the program. About three weeks later, Zhai Zhigang and Wang Yaping completed the crew's first EVA on 7 November 2021, making Wang the first Chinese female astronaut to perform an EVA.

At 07:59 UTC on 27 March 2022, the Tianzhou 2 cargo spacecraft was undocked from the Tianhe core module after completing its mission, followed by its controlled reentry into the atmosphere over the south Pacific on 31 March 2022. The Shenzhou 13 crew returned to Earth safely on 16 April 2022.

==== Phase 2: assembly and construction ====
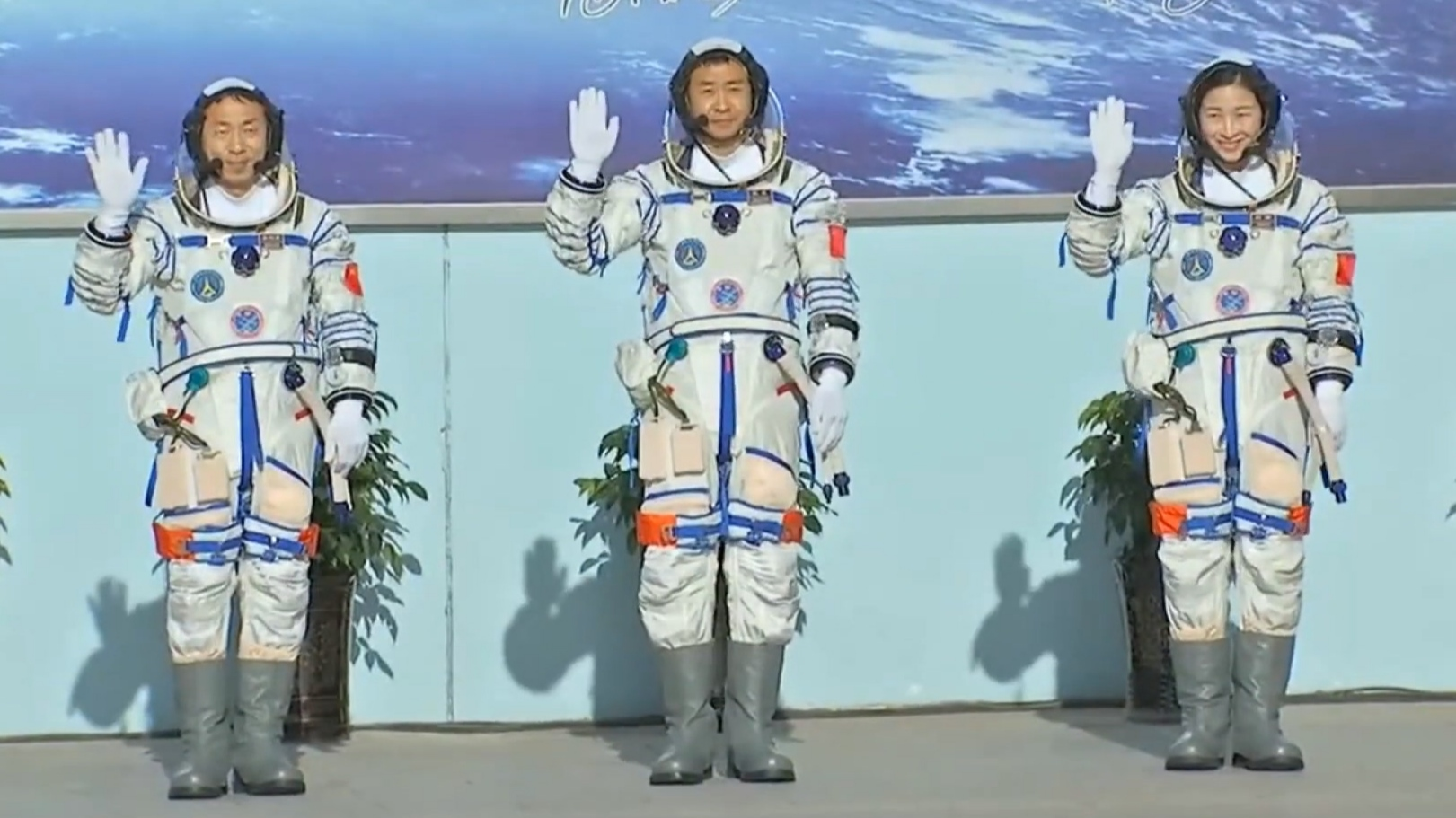
Shenzhou 14 crew Cai Xuzhe, Chen Dong and Liu Yang

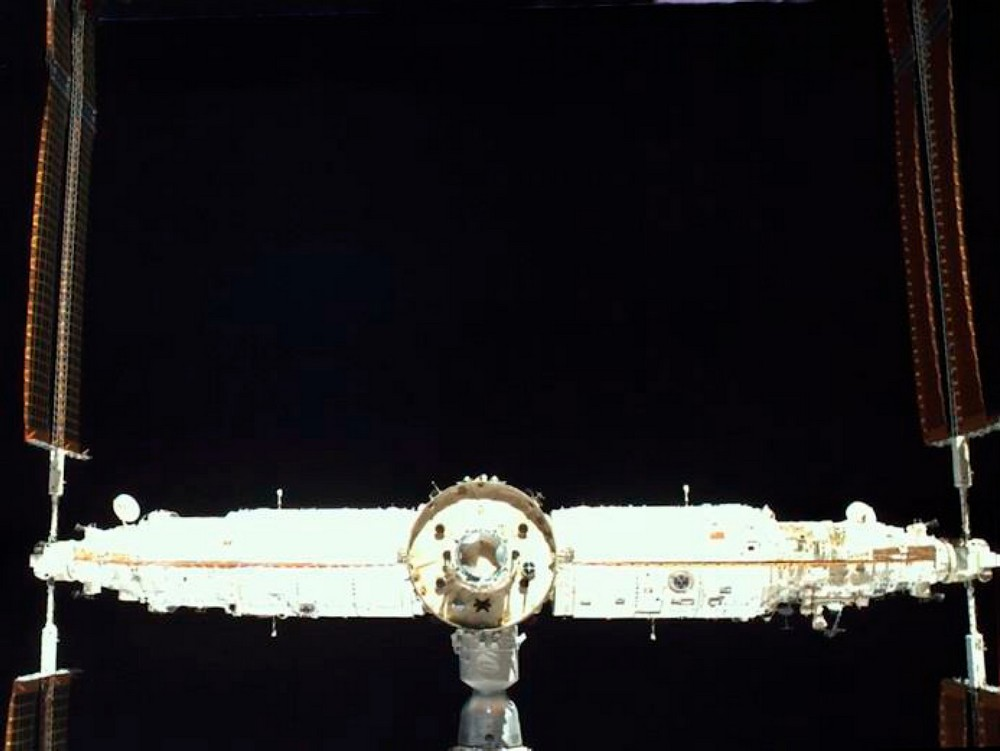
Rear view of completed Tiangong Space Station, taken by Tianzhou cargo spacecraft ahead of docking.

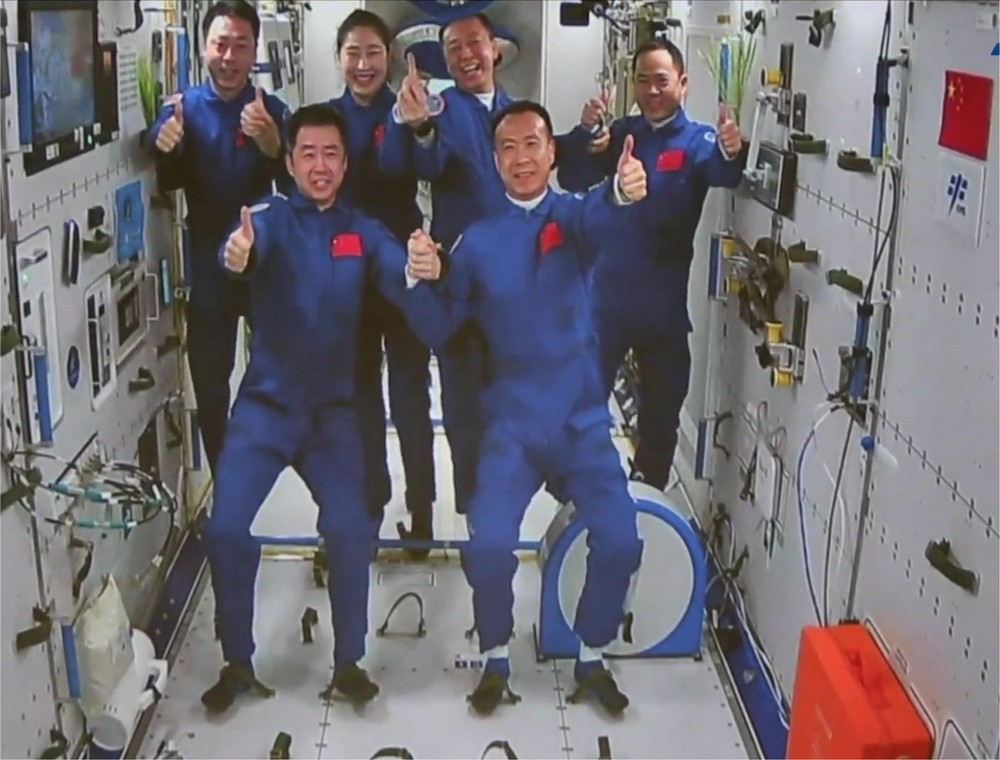
First gathering of two Chinese astronaut crews on Tiangong Space Station on 30 November 2022

Following the conclusion of phase 1, 6 more missions will be conducted to implement phase 2, including launches of 2 laboratory modules of Tiangong, 2 cargo spacecraft and 2 crewed spacecraft. All these missions are scheduled to be carried out by the end of 2022.

On 9 May 2022, Tianzhou 4 cargo spacecraft was launched to Tiangong Space Station, which docked with the station the next day.

On 5 June 2022, Shenzhou 14 was launched and docked to the Tianhe core module almost 7 hours later. The crew, including Chen Dong, Liu Yang and Cai Xuzhe, spent six months on the space station during this very first crewed mission of the construction phase.

On 17 July 2022 at 02:59 UTC, Tianzhou 3 cargo spacecraft was undocked from the Tianhe core module after completing its mission.

On 24 July 2022, the third Long March 5B rocket lifted off from Wenchang, carrying the 23,200 kg (51,100 lb) Wentian laboratory cabin module, the largest and heaviest spacecraft launched by China. The module docked with the space station less than 20 hours later, adding the second module and the first laboratory module to it.

At 10:26 UTC on 1 September 2022, two of the Shenzhou 14 crew members, Chen Dong and Liu Yang, conducted the first EVA from the Wentian module's airlock, which lasted 6 hours 7 minutes. About two weeks later, on 17 September 2022, at 05:35 UTC, the second spacewalk carried out by Chen Dong and Cai Xuzhe through the airlock of the Wentian lab module, with Liu Yang assisting the pair from inside the Tianhe core module.

On 31 October 2022, the fourth Long March 5B rocket lifted off from Wenchang, carrying the 23,200 kg (51,100 lb) Mengtian laboratory cabin module. The module docked with the space station less than 13 hours later, adding the third module and the second laboratory module to it. On 3 November 2022, the 'T-shape' Tiangong space station was formed with the transpositioning of the last module.

On 9 November 2022 at 06:55 UTC, Tianzhou 4 cargo spacecraft was undocked from the Tianhe core module after completing its mission.

On 12 November 2022, Tianzhou 5 cargo spacecraft was launched to Tiangong Space Station and docked after 2 hours and 7 minutes, breaking the world record for the fastest rendezvous and docking between a spacecraft and a space station.

On 17 November 2022 at 03:16 UTC, the third spacewalk was carried out, again by Chen Dong and Cai Xuzhe through the airlock of the Wentian lab module, with Liu Yang assisting the pair from inside the Tianhe core module.

On 29 November 2022 at 15:08 UTC, Shenzhou 15 launched from Jiuquan Satellite Launch Center; the spacecraft docked with the space station about 6 and one-half hours later at 21:42 UTC. Astronauts Fei Junlong, Deng Qingming, and Zhang Lu (the Shenzhou 15 crew) were greeted by the Shenzhou 14 crew, completing the first crew handover on the China space station.

With the completion of construction, the Space Station began the application and permanently crewed phase in which crew rotations would become routine. The station is expected to operate in orbit for no less than 10 years, and perhaps up to 15 years, until 2038.

== Composition ==
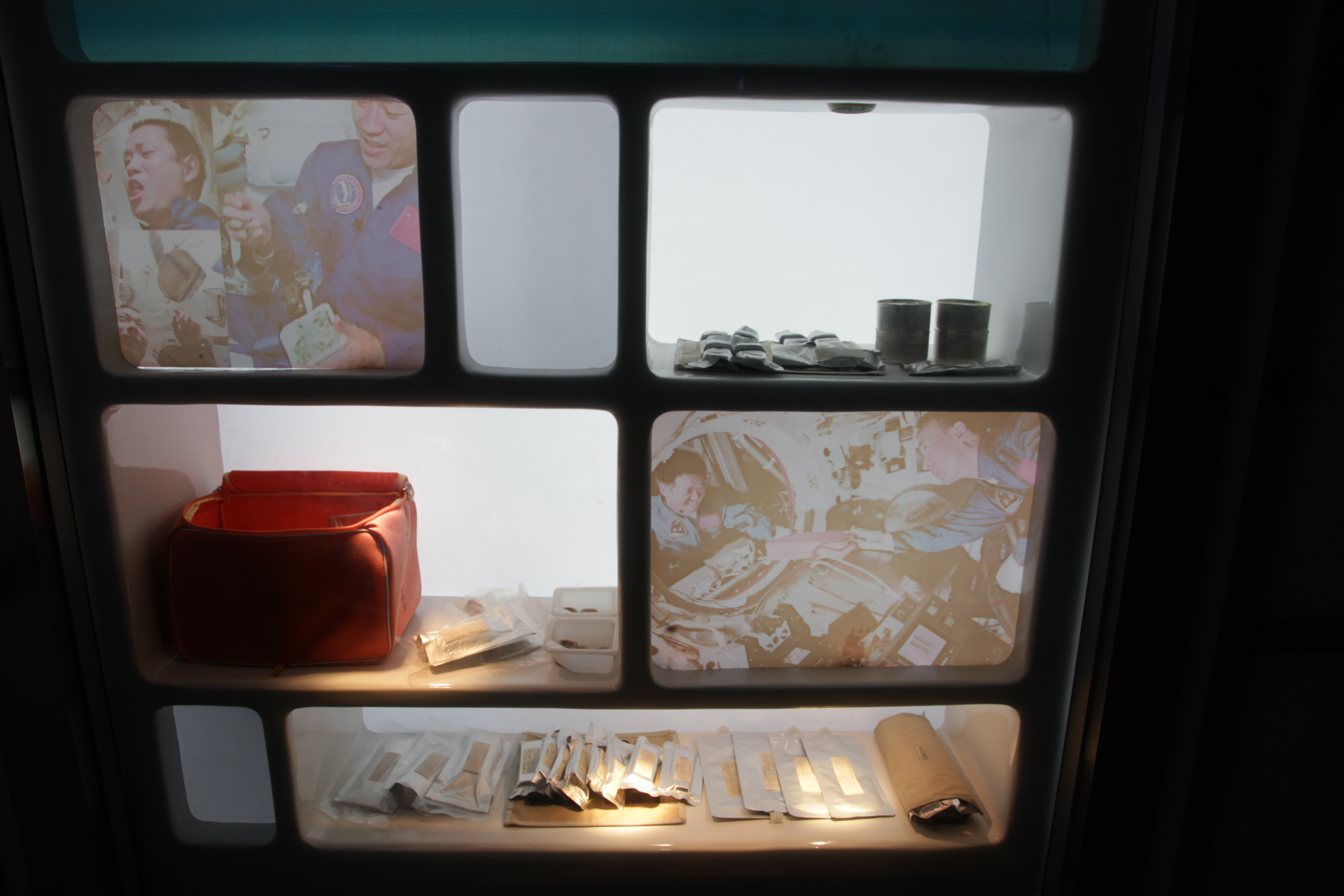
Foods carried by Chinese astronauts

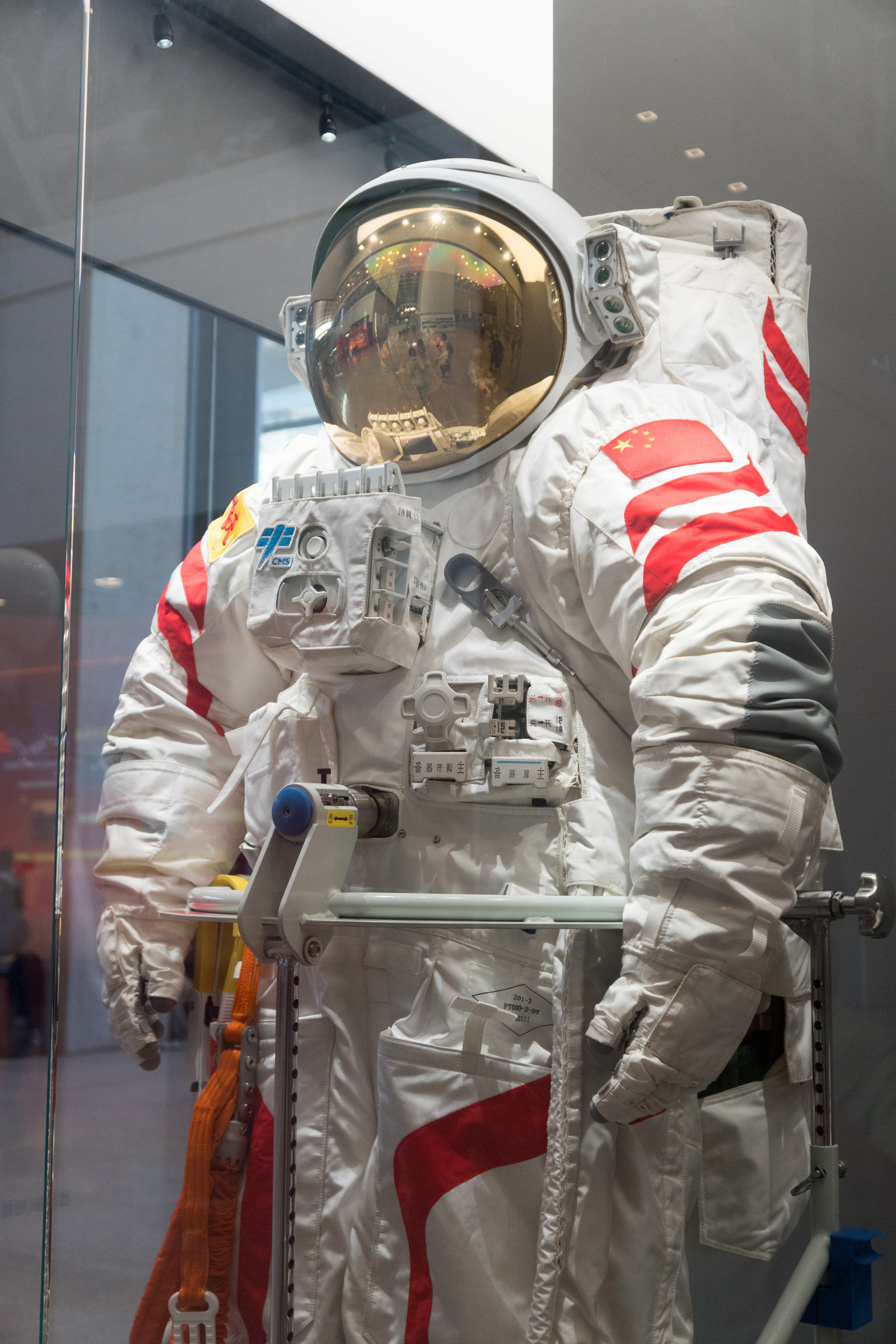
Second generation of the Feitian space suit

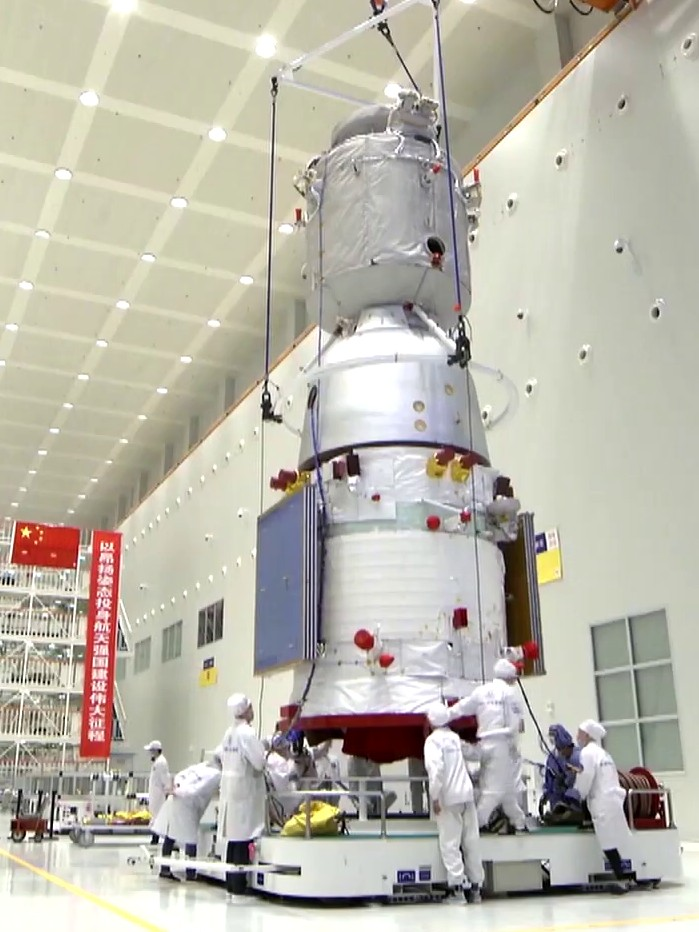
Shenzhou was the first crewed spacecraft of China.

The China Manned Space Program is composed of multiple systems supported by a broad nationwide industrial base. More than 110 units and enterprises have directly undertaken development and construction work, while over 1,000 additional organizations from sectors such as aviation, shipbuilding, machinery, electronics, chemicals, metallurgy, and construction—and from numerous provinces, municipalities, and autonomous regions—have participated in supporting roles.

The systems and their main objectives are as follows:

- Astronaut System: Responsible for selecting and training astronauts, and conducting medical monitoring and supporting astronauts during training and while in-flight.
- Space Application System: Supports scientific experiments and applied research using on-board facilities and payloads.
- Carrier Rocket System:
  - Long March 2F: Human-rated medium-lift launch vehicle used for launching Shenzhou spacecraft and early space laboratories.
  - Long March 7: Medium-lift launch vehicle used to launch Tianzhou cargo spacecraft.
  - Long March 5B: Heavy-lift launch vehicle for launching Tiangong space station modules.
- Spacecraft Systems:
  - Manned Spaceship System: Developed Shenzhou spacecraft used to transport astronauts to and from orbit.
  - Cargo Vehicle System: Developed Tianzhou spacecraft used to deliver supplies, propellant, and equipment to the space station.
  - Space Laboratory System: Developed Tiangong 1 and Tiangong 2 as prototype laboratories to validate technologies for a future space station.
  - Manned Space Station System: Developed the modular Tiangong space station, supporting long-duration research in astronomy, biology, and microgravity physics in low Earth orbit.
  - Optical Module System (under development): Developing the Xuntian space telescope that will co-orbit with the Tiangong space station and periodically dock for maintenance and upgrades.
- Launch Site System:
  - Jiuquan: Launch site in Inner Mongolia for crewed spacecraft and space laboratory missions.
  - Wenchang: Launch site on the island of Hainan for space station modules and Tianzhou cargo vehicles.
- TT&C and Communications System: Provides tracking, telemetry, command, and communication services, including voice and video links with astronauts and the relay of scientific data.
- Landing Site System: Manages tracking, search, and recovery of returned re-entry capsules in Inner Mongolia, along with post-landing astronaut support and capsule refurbishment.

== Missions ==
Mission types：

Launch vehicle test flight
Shenzhou spacecraft (uncrewed)
Shenzhou spacecraft (crewed)
Space laboratory
Space station module
Cargo spacecraft

=== Conducted missions ===
The list below includes all missions operated by CMS, including crewed and uncrewed spacecraft, cargo spaceships, launch vehicle test flights and space station modules.

No.	Mission	Launch	Launch vehicle	Launch site	Duration	Landing / re‑entry	Landing / re‑entry location	Crew	Outcome	Notes
↓ First Step ↓
1	Shenzhou 1	19 November 1999	Long March 2F	Jiuquan	21h 11m	20 November 1999	Dorbod Banner	(uncrewed)	Success	First mission of CMS. Uncrewed test flight of Shenzhou spacecraft and Long March 2F rocket.
2	Shenzhou 2	9 January 2001	Long March 2F	Jiuquan	7d 10h 22m	16 January 2001	Dorbod Banner	(uncrewed)	Partial success	Carried scientific payload including monkey, dog, rabbit and other animals.
3	Shenzhou 3	25 March 2002	Long March 2F	Jiuquan	6d 18h 51m	1 April 2002	Dorbod Banner	(uncrewed)	Success	Carried a test dummy.
4	Shenzhou 4	29 December 2002	Long March 2F	Jiuquan	6d 18h 36m	5 January 2003	Dorbod Banner	(uncrewed)	Success	Carried two test dummies and several science experiments.
5	Shenzhou 5	15 October 2003	Long March 2F	Jiuquan	21h 22m	15 October 2003	Dorbod Banner	Yang Liwei	Success	First crewed spaceflight of China; flight completed 14 Earth orbits. With this flight, China became the third nation capable of independent human spaceflight, after Russia and the U.S.
6	Shenzhou 6	12 October 2005	Long March 2F	Jiuquan	4d 19h 33 m	16 October 2005	Dorbod Banner	Fei Junlong; Nie Haisheng	Success	First two-person crew; first flight lasting multiple days.
↓ Second Step, phase 1 ↓
7	Shenzhou 7	25 September 2008	Long March 2F	Jiuquan	2d 20h 27 m	28 September 2008	Dorbod Banner	Zhai Zhigang; Liu Boming; Jing Haipeng	Success	First three-person crew; first Chinese spacewalk.
8	Tiangong 1	29 September 2011	Long March 2F	Jiuquan	—	2 April 2018	Southern Pacific	(uncrewed)	Success	Target vehicle for space rendezvous and docking testing.
9	Shenzhou 8	31 October 2011	Long March 2F	Jiuquan	16d 13h 34m	17 November 2011	Dorbod Banner	(uncrewed)	Success	Uncrewed mission, completed China's first space rendezvous and docking with Tiangong-1.
10	Shenzhou 9	16 June 2012	Long March 2F	Jiuquan	12d 15h 24 m	29 June 2012	Dorbod Banner	Jing Haipeng (2); Liu Wang; Liu Yang	Success	First Chinese woman in space; first crewed docking with Tiangong-1.
11	Shenzhou 10	11 June 2013	Long March 2F	Jiuquan	14d 14h 29 m	26 June 2013	Dorbod Banner	Nie Haisheng (2); Zhang Xiaoguang; Wang Yaping	Success	Second Chinese woman in space, second crewed docking with Tiangong-1.
↓ Second Step, phase 2 ↓
12	Long March 7 test flight	25 June 2016	Long March 7	Wenchang	—	26 June 2016	Jiuquan	(uncrewed)	Success	Long March 7 test flight carrying scale model of Mengzhou.
13	Tiangong 2	15 September 2016	Long March 2F	Jiuquan	—	19 July 2019	Southern Pacific	(uncrewed)	Success	Space laboratory, capable of in-orbit refueling.
14	Shenzhou 11	17 October 2016	Long March 2F	Jiuquan	32d 6h 29 m	18 November 2016	Dorbod Banner	Jing Haipeng (3); Chen Dong	Success	First and only crewed docking with Tiangong-2.
15	Tianzhou 1	20 April 2017	Long March 7	Wenchang	—	22 September 2017	(burned up in atmosphere)	(uncrewed)	Success	First cargo spacecraft; first in-orbit propellant transfer.
↓ Third Step ↓
16	Long March 5B test flight	5 May 2020	Long March 5B	Wenchang	—	8 May 2020	Jiuquan	(uncrewed)	Success	Long March 5B test flight carrying Mengzhou test vehicle.
17	Tianhe	29 April 2021	Long March 5B	Wenchang	—	—	—	(uncrewed)	Success	First module of the Tiangong space station.
18	Tianzhou 2	29 May 2021	Long March 7	Wenchang	—	31 March 2022	(burned up in atmosphere)	(uncrewed)	Success	First cargo spacecraft to the space station.
19	Shenzhou 12	17 June 2021	Long March 2F	Jiuquan	92d 4h 11 m	17 September 2021	Jiuquan	Nie Haisheng (3); Liu Boming (2); Tang Hongbo	Success	First crewed mission to dock with the Tiangong space station.
20	Tianzhou 3	20 September 2021	Long March 7	Wenchang	—	27 July 2022	(burned up in atmosphere)	(uncrewed)	Success	
21	Shenzhou 13	15 October 2021	Long March 2F	Jiuquan	182d 9h 32 m	16 April 2022	Jiuquan	Zhai Zhigang (2); Wang Yaping (2); Ye Guangfu	Success	First spacewalk by a female Chinese astronaut.
22	Tianzhou 4	9 May 2022	Long March 7	Wenchang	—	14 November 2022	(burned up in atmosphere)	(uncrewed)	Success	
23	Shenzhou 14	5 June 2022	Long March 2F	Jiuquan	182d 9h 25m	4 December 2022	Jiuquan	Chen Dong (2); Liu Yang (2); Cai Xuzhe	Success	Crew saw docking of two lab modules, completing the construction of the station.
24	Wentian	24 July 2022	Long March 5B	Wenchang	—	—	—	(uncrewed)	Success	Laboratory Cabin Module I of the Tiangong space station.
25	Mengtian	31 October 2022	Long March 5B	Wenchang	—	—	—	(uncrewed)	Success	Laboratory Cabin Module II of the Tiangong space station.
26	Tianzhou 5	12 November 2022	Long March 7	Wenchang	—	13 September 2023	(burned up in atmosphere)	(uncrewed)	Success	Broke the record of shortest time from launch to docking (2 hours, 7 minutes).
27	Shenzhou 15	29 November 2022	Long March 2F	Jiuquan	186d 7h 25m	3 June 2023	Jiuquan	Fei Junlong (2); Deng Qingming; Zhang Lu	Success	First crew to overlap with the prior crew so that the station remains continuously inhabited.
↓ Space station application and development phase ↓
28	Tianzhou 6	10 May 2023	Long March 7	Wenchang	—	19 January 2024	(burned up in atmosphere)	(uncrewed)	Success	First launch of improved Tianzhou.
29	Shenzhou 16	30 May 2023	Long March 2F	Jiuquan	153d 22h 41m	31 October 2023	Jiuquan	Jing Haipeng (4); Zhu Yangzhu; Gui Haichao	Success	First mission with a civilian astronaut (payload specialist).
30	Shenzhou 17	26 October 2023	Long March 2F	Jiuquan	187d 6h 32m	30 April 2024	Jiuquan	Tang Hongbo (2); Tang Shengjie; Jiang Xinlin	Success	
31	Tianzhou 7	17 January 2024	Long March 7	Wenchang	—	17 November 2024	(burned up in atmosphere)	(uncrewed)	Success	
32	Shenzhou 18	25 April 2024	Long March 2F	Jiuquan	192d 4h 25m	3 November 2024	Jiuquan	Ye Guangfu (2); Li Cong; Li Guangsu	Success	
33	Shenzhou 19	29 October 2024	Long March 2F	Jiuquan	182d 8h 41m	30 April 2025	Jiuquan	Cai Xuzhe (2); Song Lingdong; Wang Haoze	Success	
34	Tianzhou 8	15 November 2024	Long March 7	Wenchang	—	8 July 2025	(burned up in atmosphere)	(uncrewed)	Success	
35	Shenzhou 20	24 April 2025	Long March 2F	Jiuquan	203d 23h 22m	Crew: 14 November 2025 Spacecraft: 19 January 2026	Jiuquan	Chen Dong (3); Chen Zhongrui; Wang Jie	Success	Launched crewed but landed uncrewed due to cracks in spacecraft's porthole caused by external space debris impact. Crew landed on Shenzhou 21.
36	Tianzhou 9	14 July 2025	Long March 7	Wenchang	—	7 May 2026	(burned up in atmosphere)	(uncrewed)	Success	
37	Shenzhou 21	31 October 2025	Long March 2F	Jiuquan	209d 20h 27m	Spacecraft: 14 November 2025 Crew: 29 May 2026	Jiuquan	Zhang Lu (2); Wu Fei; Zhang Hongzhang	Success	Landed with Shenzhou 20 crew due to cracks in Shenzhou 20 spacecraft's porthole caused by external space debris impact. Crew returned via Shenzhou 22.
38	Shenzhou 22	25 November 2025	Long March 2F	Jiuquan	185d 8h	29 May 2026	Jiuquan	(uncrewed at launch)	Success	Launched uncrewed to take home crew of Shenzhou 21.
39	Tianzhou 10	11 May 2026	Long March 7	Wenchang	—	—	(burned up in atmosphere)	(uncrewed)	Ongoing	
40	Shenzhou 23	24 May 2026	Long March 2F	Jiuquan	180d (planned)	2026 (planned)	Jiuquan	Zhu Yangzhu (2); Zhang Zhiyuan; Li Jiaying	Ongoing	First astronaut from Hong Kong.

=== Upcoming missions ===
Mission	Launch (planned)	Launch Vehicle	Launch site	Duration	Landing/Re-entry	Landing/Re-entry Location	Crew	Notes
Shenzhou 24	October 2026	Long March 2F	Jiuquan	180d	2027	Jiuquan	TBA	
Mengzhou 1	Late 2026	Long March 10A	Wenchang	—	—	—	(uncrewed)	Uncrewed test flight of Mengzhou spacecraft and Long March 10A rocket.
Xuntian	2027	Long March 5B	Wenchang	—	—	—	(uncrewed)	Space telescope co-orbiting with the Tiangong space station.

== Astronauts (Taikonauts) ==
=== November 1996 trainer selection ===
There were two astronaut trainers selected for Project 921. They trained at the Yuri Gagarin Cosmonauts Training Center in Russia.

1. Li Qinglong – born August 1962 in Dingyuan, Anhui Province and PLAAF interceptor pilot and space instructor at Star City
2. Wu Jie – born October 1963 in Zhengzhou, Henan Province and PLAAF fighter pilot

=== January 1998 astronaut candidate selection ===
1. Chen Quan – PLAAF pilot
2. Deng Qingming – from Jiangxi Province and PLAAF pilot, back up on Shenzhou 11, flew on Shenzhou 15
3. Fei Junlong – second Chinese astronaut, commander of Shenzhou 6 and Shenzhou 15
4. Jing Haipeng – born October 1966 and PLAAF pilot, astronaut of Shenzhou 7, Shenzhou 9, Shenzhou 11 and Shenzhou 16
5. Liu Boming – born September 1966 and PLAAF pilot, astronaut of Shenzhou 7 and Shenzhou 12
6. Liu Wang – born in Shanxi Province and PLAAF pilot, flew on Shenzhou 9
7. Nie Haisheng – back up in Shenzhou 5, flight engineer on Shenzhou 6, commander of Shenzhou 10 and Shenzhou 12
8. Pan Zhanchun – PLAAF pilot
9. Yang Liwei – first man sent into space by the space program of China on Shenzhou 5, made the PRC the third country to independently send people into space
10. Zhai Zhigang – back up in Shenzhou 5, commander of Shenzhou 7 and Shenzhou 13
11. Zhang Xiaoguang – born in Liaoning Province and PLAAF pilot, flew on Shenzhou 10
12. Zhao Chuandong – PLAAF pilot

=== 2010 astronaut candidate selection ===
1. Cai Xuzhe – flew on Shenzhou 14 and Shenzhou 19
2. Chen Dong – flew on Shenzhou 11, Shenzhou 14 and Shenzhou 20
3. Liu Yang – first Chinese woman in space, flew on Shenzhou 9 and Shenzhou 14
4. Tang Hongbo – flew on Shenzhou 12 and Shenzhou 17
5. Wang Yaping – second Chinese woman in space, flew on Shenzhou 10 and Shenzhou 13
6. Ye Guangfu – flew on Shenzhou 13 and Shenzhou 18
7. Zhang Lu – flew on Shenzhou 15 and Shenzhou 21

=== 2020 astronaut candidate selection ===
18 people - 17 men, 1 woman, 6 of whose names have yet to be revealed - had been selected as new astronauts. The positions were broken down as 7 spacecraft pilots ("aviators of the People's Liberation Army Air Force"), 7 flight engineers ("former researchers or technicians in aeronautics, astronautics and other related fields"), and 4 mission payload specialists ("those involved in space science and through applications for China's manned space program").

1. Zhu Yangzhu - flew on Shenzhou 16 as spaceflight engineer
2. Gui Haichao - flew on Shenzhou 16 as payload specialist
3. Jiang Xinlin - flew on Shenzhou 17 as spaceflight engineer
4. Tang Shengjie - flew on Shenzhou 17 as pilot
5. Li Cong - flew on Shenzhou 18 as spaceflight engineer
6. Li Guangsu - flew on Shenzhou 18 as pilot
7. Song Lingdong - flew on Shenzhou 19 as pilot
8. Wang Haoze - third Chinese woman in space, flew on Shenzhou 19 as spaceflight engineer
9. Chen Zhongrui - flew on Shenzhou 20 as pilot
10. Wang Jie - flew on Shenzhou 20 as spaceflight engineer
11. Wu Fei - flew on Shenzhou 21 as spaceflight engineer
12. Zhang Hongzhang - flew on Shenzhou 21 as payload specialist

=== 2022 astronaut candidate selection ===
CMSA began selecting a fourth batch of astronauts in 2022. The agency had expected to select 7-8 spacecraft pilots ("aviators of the People's Liberation Army Air Force") and 5-6 spaceflight engineers ("former researchers or technicians in aeronautics, astronautics and other related fields"). Up to two of the latter group will become payload specialists ("those involved in space science and through applications for China's manned space program"). Candidacy was extended to include Hong Kong and Macau.

On 11 June 2024, CMSA announced that 10 new astronauts were selected after the completion of the 2022 selection process. 8 of the 10 new astronauts are pilots while the remaining 2 are payload specialists. Notably, the two new payload specialists are China's first astronauts from Hong Kong and Macao special administrative regions; in addition, the payload specialist from Hong Kong SAR is female. The new astronauts will undergo two years of basic training for space station missions as well as for crewed lunar missions.

== International collaborations ==
In November 2011, the China National Space Administration and the Italian Space Agency signed an initial cooperative agreement, covering areas of collaboration within space transportation, telecommunications, Earth observation, and so on.

In 2016, the China Manned Space Agency (CMSA) signed a Framework Agreement and a Funding Agreement with the United Nations Office for Outer Space Affairs (UNOOSA) to increase cooperation on a future Chinese space station.

On 22 February 2017, the CMSA and the Italian Space Agency (ASI) signed an agreement to cooperate on long-term human spaceflight activities. The agreement holds importance due to Italy's leading position in the field of human spaceflight with regards to the creation and exploitation of the International Space Station (Node 2, Node 3, Columbus, Cupola, Leonardo, Raffaello, Donatello, PMM, etc.) and it signified Italy's increased anticipation in China's developing space station programme. The European Space Agency (ESA) started human spaceflight training with CMSA in 2017, with the ultimate goal of sending ESA astronauts to Tiangong. To prepare for the future missions, selected ESA astronauts lived together with their Chinese counterparts and engaged in training sessions such as splashes-down survival, language learning, and spacecraft operations. However, in January 2023, ESA announced that the agency will not send its astronauts to China's space station due to political and financial reasons.

On 28 May 2018, UNOOSA and CMSA announced an initiative to accept applications from United Nations member state to conduct experiments onboard China's space station.

On 12 June 2019, the winners of the competition were announced. Nine projects, involving 23 institutions from 17 member states of the United Nations, were selected by experts.

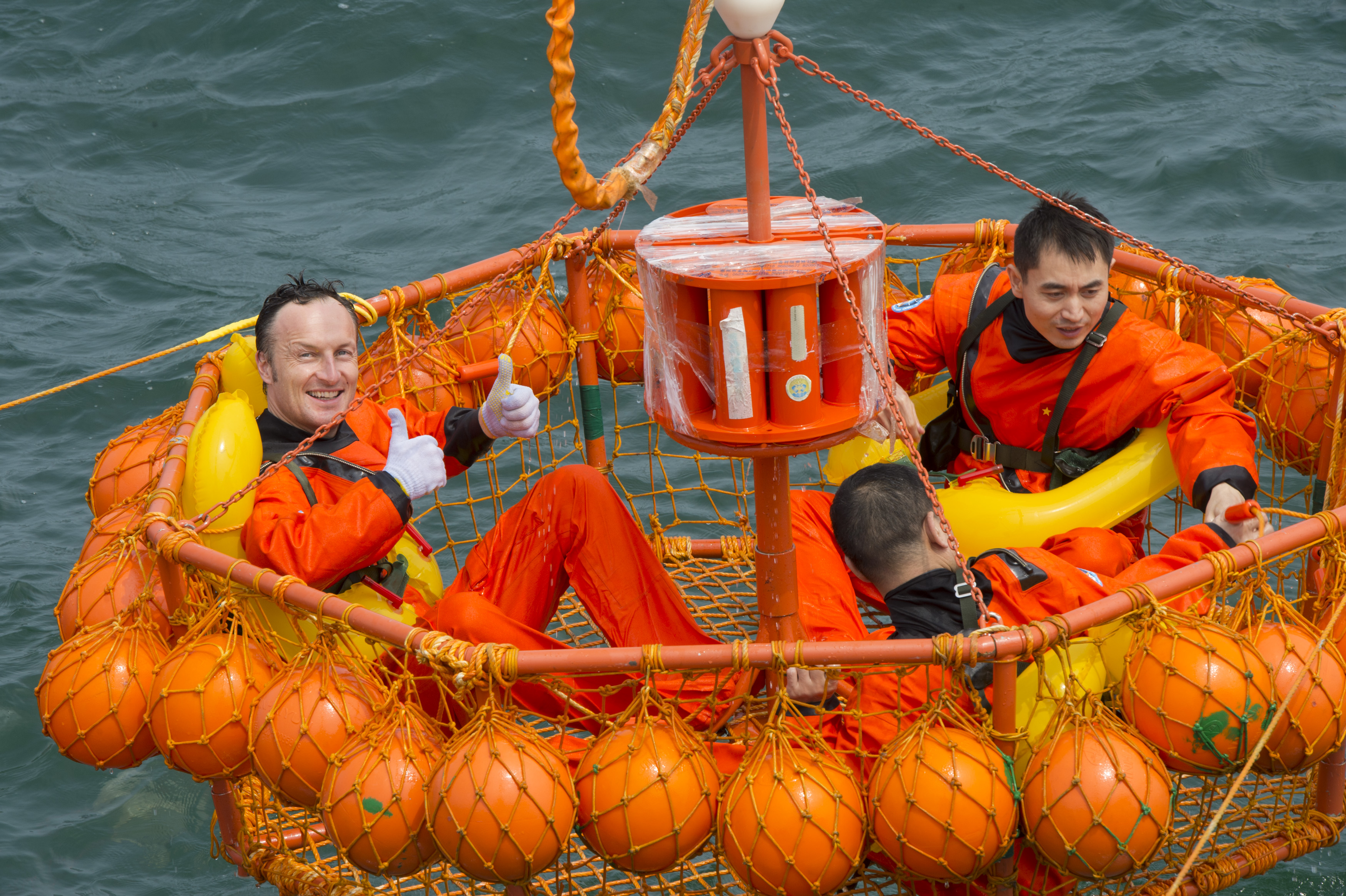
ESA astronaut Matthias Maurer undergoing sea survival training in China, 2017

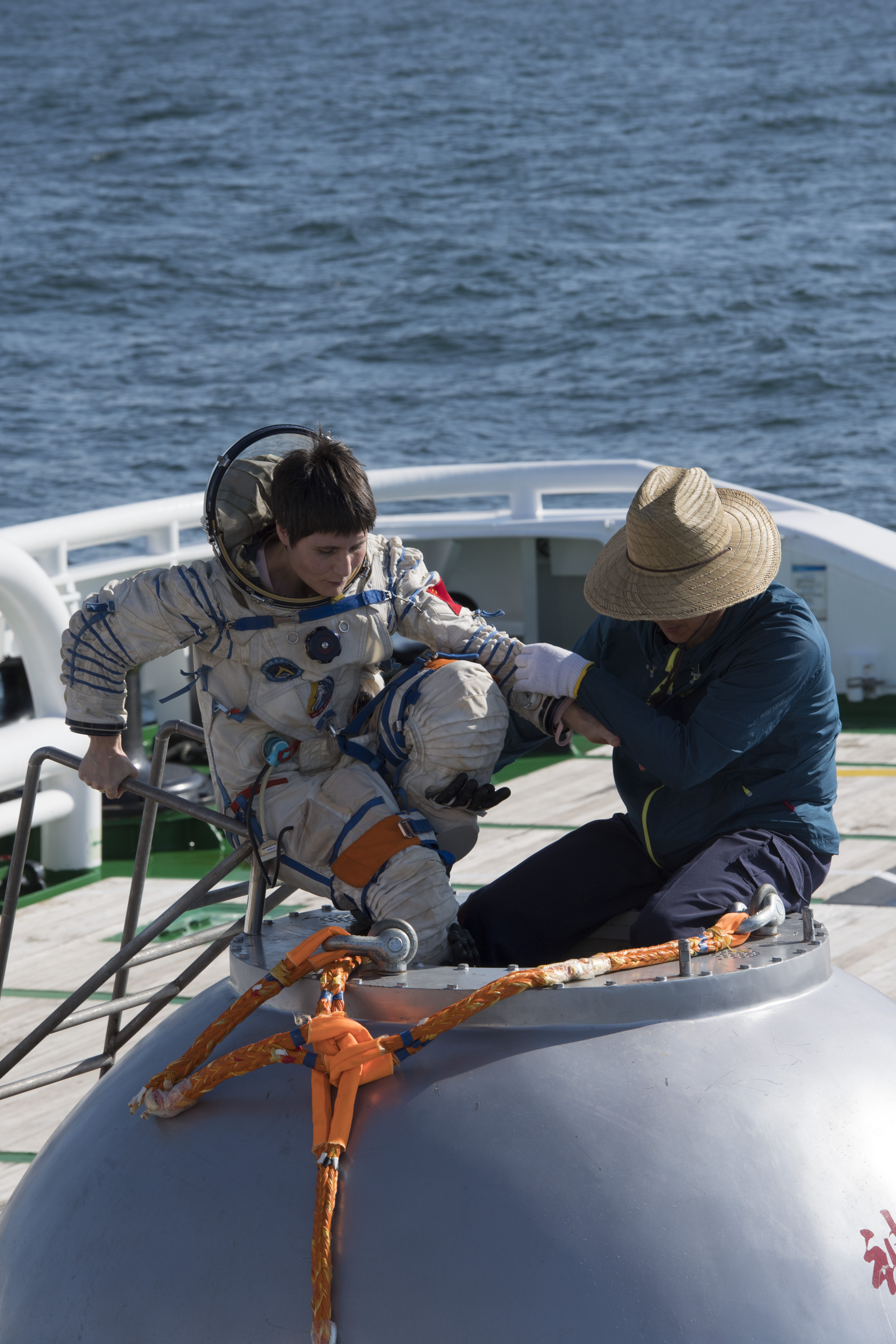
ESA astronaut Samantha Cristoforetti on the Shenzhou training capsule

== See also ==
- China Manned Space Agency
- Space program of China
- Tiangong program
- Tiangong Space Station
