= Shenzhou 24 =

Planned Chinese crewed spaceflight to the Tiangong space station

- Mission type: Tiangong space station crew transport
- Operator: China Manned Space Agency
- Mission duration: 180 days (planned)

Spacecraft properties
- Spacecraft type: Shenzhou
- Manufacturer: China Aerospace Science and Technology Corporation

Crew
- Crew size: 3
- Members: TBA

Start of mission
- Launch date: NET 25 November 2026, 00:18 UTC (08:18 CST)
- Rocket: Long March 2F
- Launch site: Jiuquan, LA-4/SLS-1
- Contractor: China Academy of Launch Vehicle Technology

End of mission
- Landing date: May 2027 (planned)
- Landing site: Inner Mongolia, China

Orbital parameters
- Reference system: Geocentric orbit
- Regime: Low Earth orbit
- Inclination: 41.5°

Docking with Tiangong space station
- Docking port: Tianhe forward
- Docking date: 25 November 2026 (planned)
- Undocking date: May 2027 (planned)
- Time docked: 180 days (planned)
- Mission insignia China Manned Space Program Shenzhou spacecraft

Shenzhou 24 (simplified Chinese: 神舟二十四号; traditional Chinese: 神舟二十四號; pinyin: Shénzhōu èrshísì hào) is a planned Chinese spaceflight to the Tiangong space station. It is planned to carry three taikonauts on board a Shenzhou spacecraft. The mission will be the 18th crewed Chinese spaceflight and the 24th flight overall of the Shenzhou program.

Shenzhou 24 is expected to bring the first Pakistani astronaut for a one-week visit to the station, either Muhammad Zeeshan Ali or Khurram Daud.

== Mission ==
The mission will launch from the center on a Long March 2F rocket. The Shenzhou spacecraft will likely dock with the forward docking port on the Tianhe core module of the station.

== Crew ==
In keeping with previous Chinese crewed missions, the crew of Shenzhou 24 is not expected to be announced until the day before the flight. CMSA has nominated Muhammad Zeeshan Ali and Khurram Daud from Pakistani space agency SUPARCO as its first two international astronaut candidates, one of whom is expected to fly to Tiangong for a one-week visit on Shenzhou 24.

Position	Launching crew	Landing crew
Commander	TBA	
Pilot	TBA	
Spaceflight participant/Payload specialist	TBA (Muhammad Zeeshan Ali or Khurram Daud), SUPARCO; First spaceflight	TBA (Zhu Yangzhu, Zhang Zhiyuan or Lai Ka-ying)
