= Long March 2F =

Chinese rocket

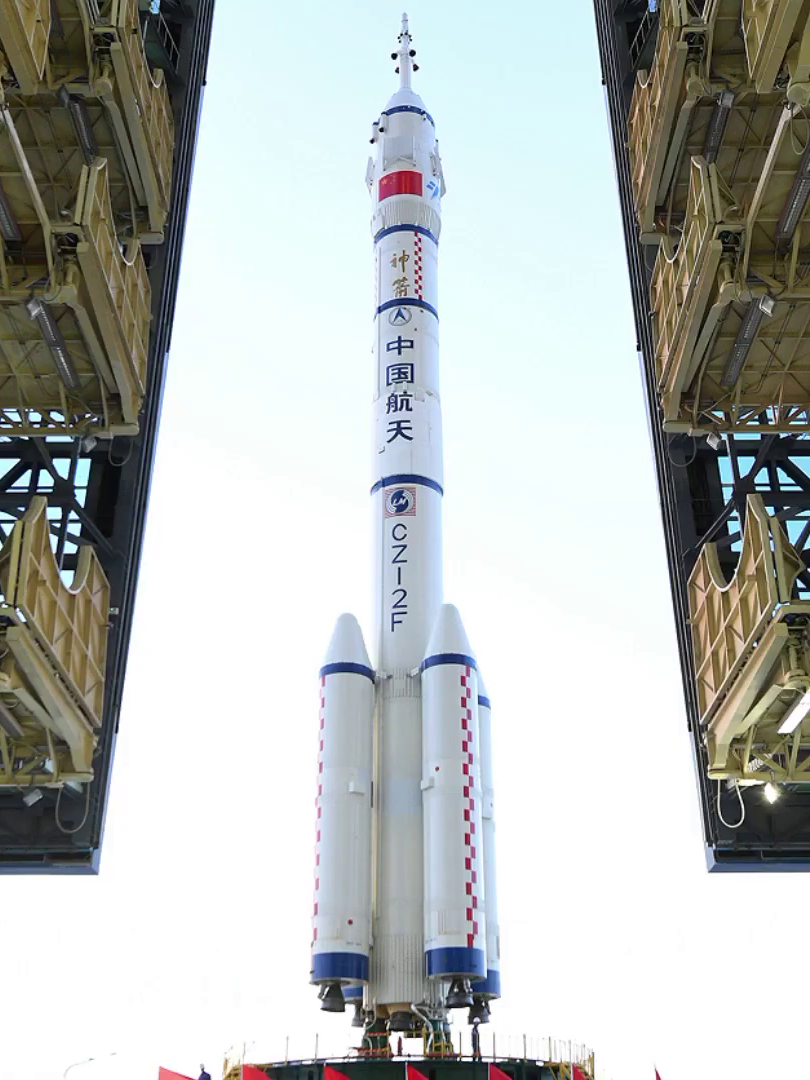
- The Long March 2F rocket with Shenzhou 13 spacecraft mounted on the top
- Function: Medium-lift launch vehicle
- Manufacturer: China Academy of Launch Vehicle Technology
- Country of origin: China

Size
- Height: 58.34 m (191.4 ft)
- Diameter: 3.35 m (11 ft)
- Mass: 464,000 kg (1,023,000 lb)
- Stages: 2

Capacity

Payload to LEO
- Mass: 8,400 kg (18,500 lb)

Associated rockets
- Family: Long March 2

Launch history
- Status: Active
- Launch sites: Jiuquan, LA-4/SLS-1
- Total launches: 29
- Success(es): 29
- First flight: 19 November 1999
- Last flight: 24 May 2026 (most recent)
- Carries passengers or cargo: Shenzhou; Tiangong-1; Tiangong-2; Reusable experimental spacecraft

Boosters
- No. boosters: 4
- Height: 15.33 m (50.3 ft)
- Diameter: 2.25 m (7 ft 5 in)
- Empty mass: 3,200 kg (7,100 lb)
- Gross mass: 41,000 kg (90,000 lb)
- Powered by: 1 × YF-20B per booster
- Maximum thrust: 816.285 kN (183,508 lb_{f})
- Total thrust: 3,265.14 kN (734,030 lb_{f})
- Specific impulse: 261 s (2.56 km/s)
- Burn time: 2F: 128 seconds; 2F/G & 2F/T: 153 seconds
- Propellant: N_{2}O_{4} / UDMH

First stage
- Height: 23.7 m (78 ft)
- Empty mass: 9,500 kg (20,900 lb)
- Gross mass: 196,500 kg (433,200 lb)
- Powered by: 4 × YF-20B
- Maximum thrust: 3,265.143 kN (734,033 lb_{f})
- Specific impulse: SL: 261 s (2.56 km/s); vac: 289 s (2.83 km/s)
- Burn time: 166 seconds
- Propellant: N_{2}O_{4} / UDMH

Second stage
- Height: 15.52 m (50.9 ft)
- Empty mass: 5,500 kg (12,100 lb)
- Gross mass: 91,500 kg (201,700 lb)
- Powered by: 1 × YF-24B
- Maximum thrust: 831.005 kN (186,817 lb_{f})
- Specific impulse: 298 s (2.92 km/s)
- Burn time: 295 seconds
- Propellant: N_{2}O_{4} / UDMH

The Long March 2F (LM-2F; Chinese: 长征二号F火箭), also known as Chang Zheng 2F (CZ-2F), is a Chinese human-rated two-stage hypergolic-fuelled medium-lift launch vehicle, part of the Long March 2 rocket family. Launching the Shenzhou spacecraft on all 22 flights of the Shenzhou program, it is one of three in-service orbital rockets worldwide to have launched multiple crews, alongside Russia's Soyuz-2 and the US Falcon 9.

The Long March 2F is a two-stage version of the Long March 2E rocket, which in turn was based on the Long March 2C launch vehicle. The entire family is based on the Soviet R-2. The rocket is entirely fuelled by the hypergolic mixture of unsymmetrical dimethylhydrazine and dinitrogen tetroxide. The first stage is powered by four YF-20B engines, as well as four boosters each with one such engine; the second stage uses one YF-24 engine.

It is launched from complex SLS at the Jiuquan Satellite Launch Center. The Long March 2F made its maiden flight on 19 November 1999, with the Shenzhou 1 spacecraft. After the flight of Shenzhou 3, Chinese President Jiang Zemin named the rocket Shenjian (神箭, lit. 'Divine Arrow').

On 15 October 2003, a Long March 2F launched Shenzhou 5, China's maiden crewed mission and achieved its first human spaceflight. Since then, the rocket has launched twenty-one more missions into orbit with the latest being the Shenzhou 23 spacecraft. Since 2021, it provides crew access to the Tiangong space station. The rocket launched the prototype space stations of the Tiangong program: Tiangong-1 (crewed 2012 and 2013) and Tiangong-2 (crewed 2016). The Long March 2F is also the launch vehicle for the clandestine Chinese reusable experimental spaceplane.

== Differences from the Long March 2E ==
Externally, the rocket is similar to the Long March 2E from which it was derived. Most of the changes involve the addition of redundant systems to improve safety, although there are some structural modifications that allow the rocket to support the heavier fairing required by the Shenzhou capsule. The rocket is also capable of lifting heavier payloads with the addition of extra boosters to the first stage.

The rocket also has an "advanced fault monitoring and diagnosis system to help the astronauts escape in time of emergency" (in other words, a launch escape system), and is the first Chinese made rocket to be assembled and rolled out to its launch site vertically.

== Derivatives ==
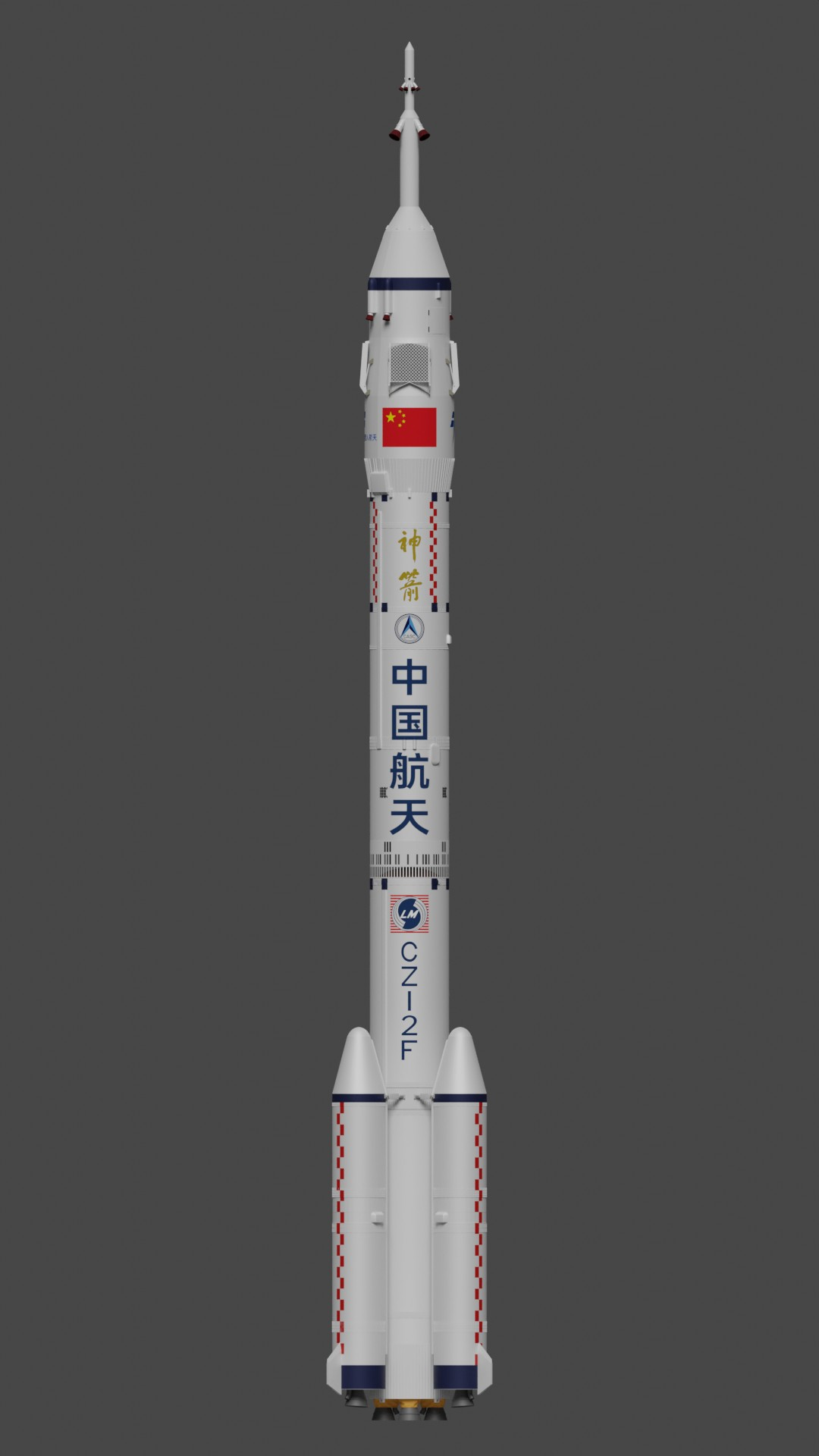
Long March 2F/G version

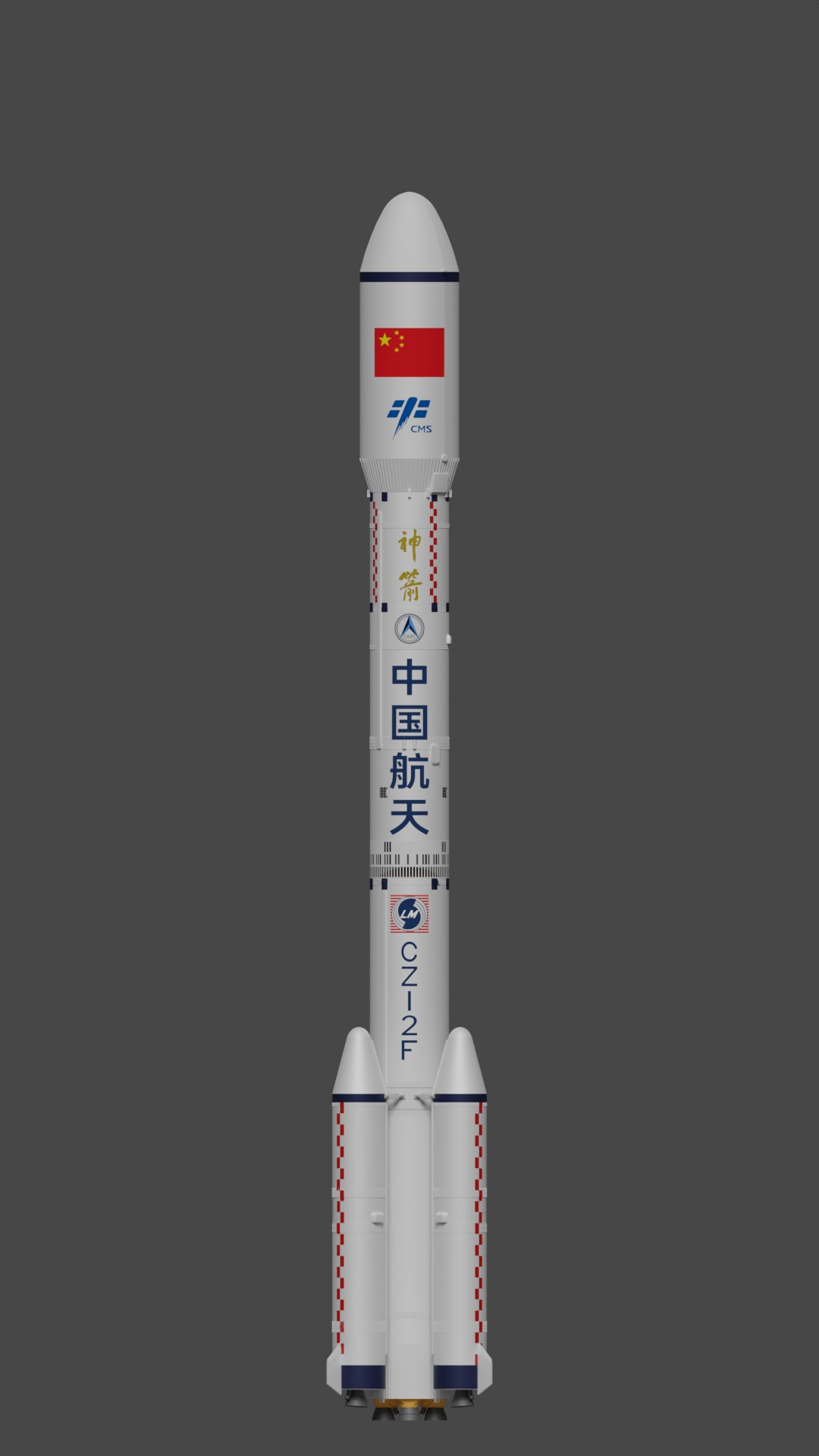
Long March 2F/T version

The Long March 2F/G and Long March 2F/T are improved variants of the Long March 2F. Development of the upgraded versions was approved in 2004, and first launched on 29 September 2011 carrying the Tiangong-1 space laboratory.

The improved variants introduced extensive changes to the rocket's core systems. The booster propellant tanks were redesigned with conical upper sections instead of elliptical domes, increasing propellant capacity and improving low Earth orbit performance. Booster separation was also delayed from 140 seconds after liftoff to 153 seconds, shortly before first-stage separation.

The Long March 2F/G variant has been used for all Shenzhou missions since Shenzhou 8 and retains the launch escape system. The Long March 2F/T variant was developed for uncrewed missions including Tiangong-1 and Tiangong-2. It omits the escape tower and uses a larger 4.2-metre (14 ft) payload fairing to accommodate larger spacecraft. It has also been used to launch the Chinese reusable experimental spacecraft, where it uses a special fairings with bulges to accommodate portions of the payload without requiring a larger overall fairing.

The Long March 2F/G has a length of 58.34 metres (191.4 ft), a liftoff mass of 479.8 tonnes (1,058,000 lb), a 3.8-metre (12 ft) fairing diameter, and a low Earth orbit payload capacity of 8.15 tonnes (18,000 lb). The Long March 2F/T has a length of 52.03 metres (170.7 ft), a liftoff mass of 493.1 tonnes (1,087,000 lb), a 4.2-metre (14 ft) fairing diameter, and a low Earth orbit payload capacity of 8.6 tonnes (19,000 lb).

Beginning with the Shenzhou 12 mission, the Long March 2F/G entered a dual-vehicle standby mode at the Jiuquan Satellite Launch Center to support emergency crew-return requirements during construction and operation of the Tiangong space station. Under this arrangement, one launch vehicle remained prepared as a backup while another was assigned to the scheduled mission. Preparation time was later reduced from 49 days for Shenzhou 12 to 35 days by Shenzhou 15.

== Vibration issues ==
During the Shenzhou 5 mission, Yang Liwei experienced discomfort caused by heavy vibration during launch. Although later modifications reduced the problem, vibrations were again reported during Shenzhou 6, leading to additional design changes. According to Long March 2F chief designer Jing Muchun, "We made changes to the pipelines of the rocket engine, adjusting its frequency. A new design for the pressure accumulator produced evident results. The vibration has now been reduced by more than 50%". During launch preparations for the Shenzhou 14 mission, chief designer Gao Xu stated that incremental design improvements had reduced vibration levels experienced by taikonauts to those comparable to riding in a car on a highway.

The Long March 2E rocket on which the 2F was based, also experienced vibration-related problems. During two launches, excessive vibration caused the collapse of the payload fairing, destroying the Optus B2 and Apstar 2 satellites. Even after the payload fairing was redesigned, excessive vibration damaged the AsiaSat 2 satellite during launch. The Long March 2E rocket was retired from service on 28 December 1995.

== Gallery ==
Long March 2F rocket schematics

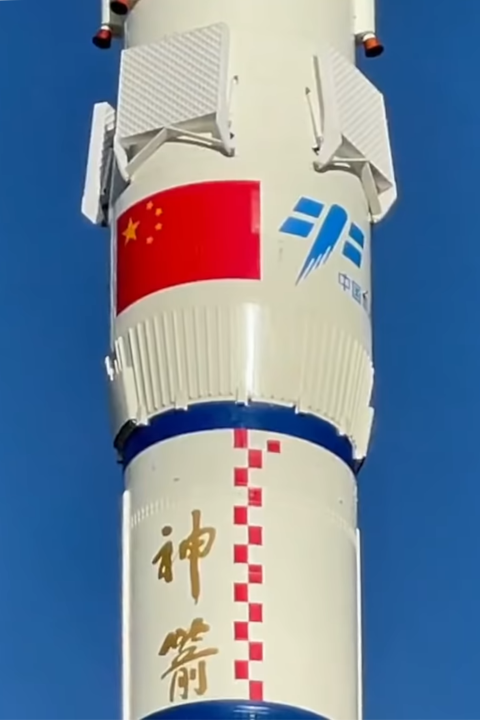
The Long March 2F rocket with folded grid fins carrying the Shenzhou 12 spacecraft, inscribed with "Divine Arrow" (神箭) in Chinese

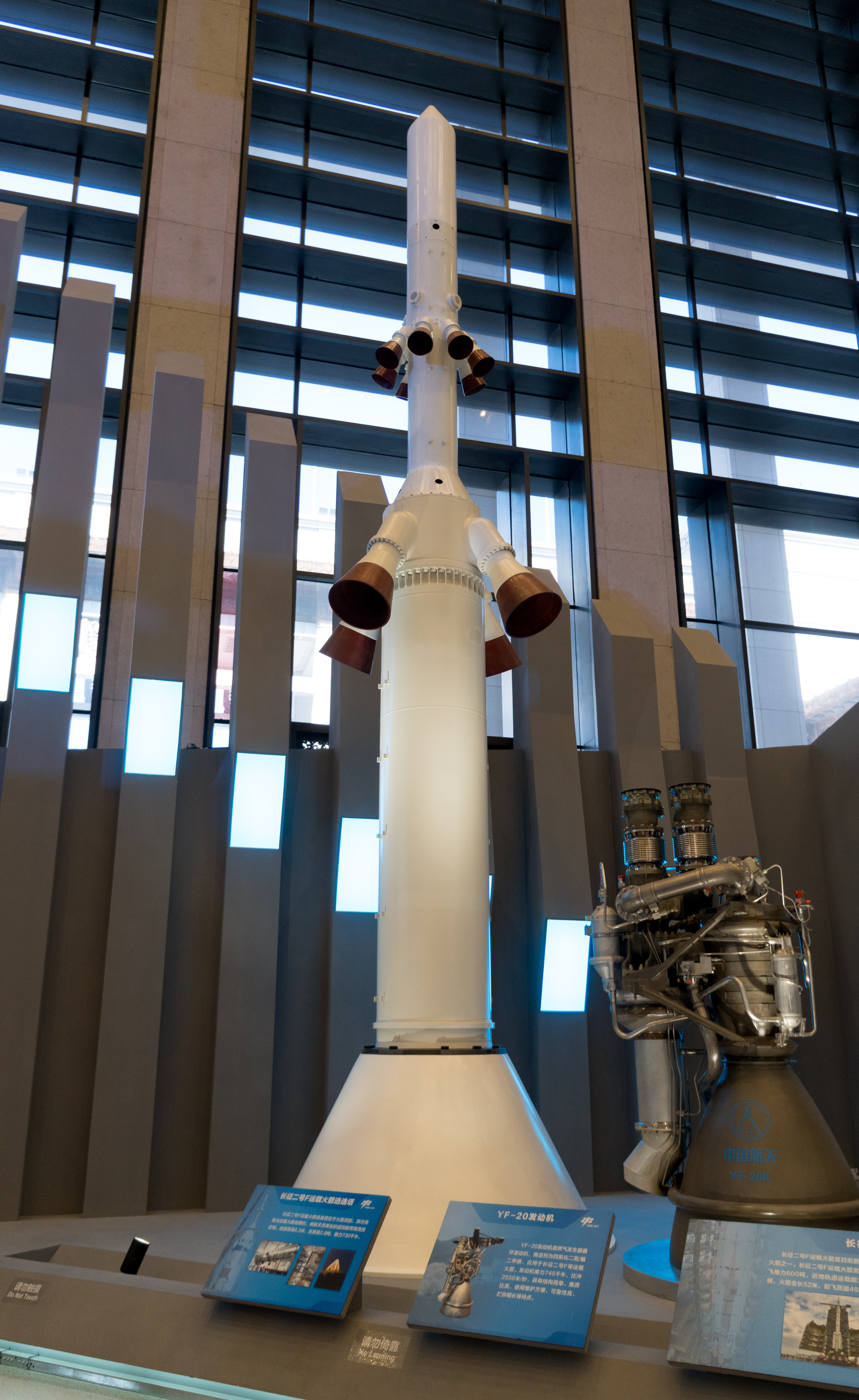
Launch escape tower of the Long March 2F

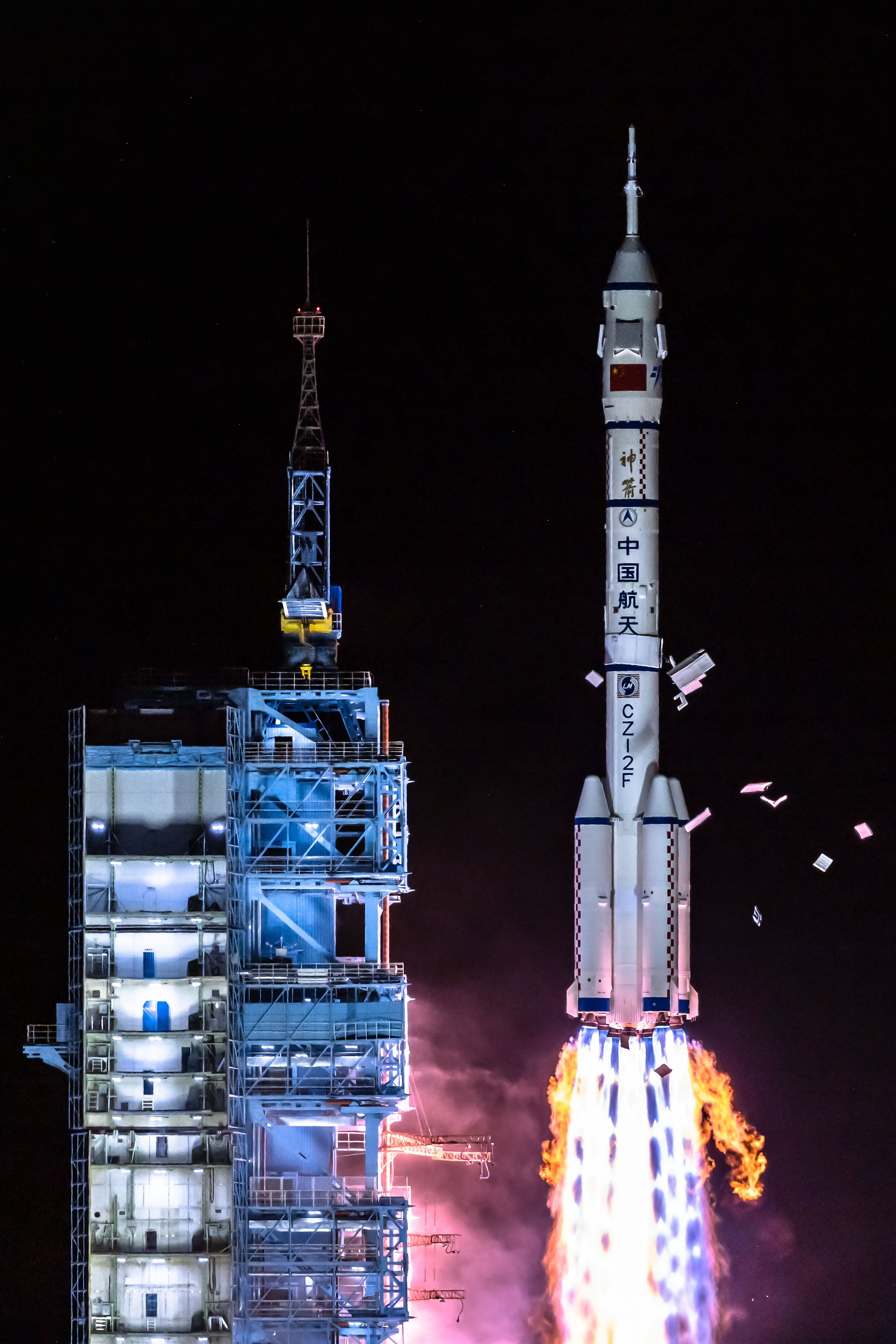
Launch of Shenzhou 13

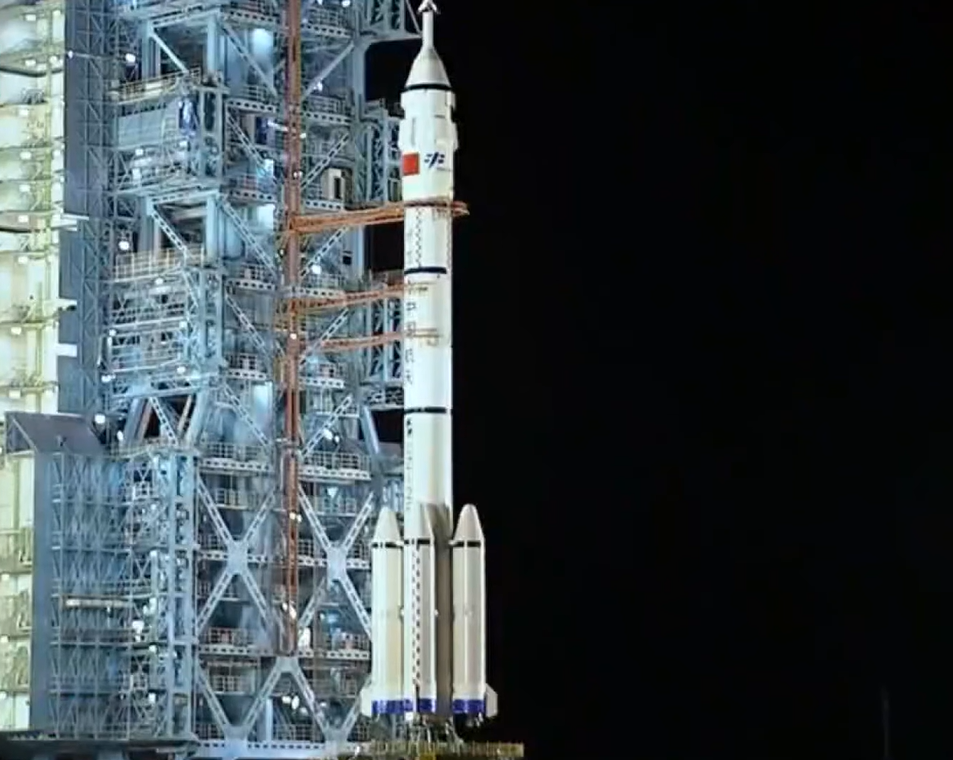
Shenzhou 15 before liftoff

== Launch statistics ==
- Failure
- Partial failure
- Success
- Planned

== List of launches ==
Flight	Date (UTC)	Version	Payload	Orbit	Crew	Result	Remarks
Y1	19 November 1999; 22:30	2F	Shenzhou 1	LEO	—N/a	Success	First uncrewed test of the Shenzhou spacecraft
Y2	9 January 2001; 17:00	2F	Shenzhou 2	LEO	—N/a	Success	Second uncrewed test of the Shenzhou spacecraft, carried live animals.
Y3	25 March 2002; 14:15	2F	Shenzhou 3	LEO	—N/a	Success	Third uncrewed test of the Shenzhou spacecraft.
Y4	29 December 2002; 16:40	2F	Shenzhou 4	LEO	—N/a	Success	Final uncrewed test of the Shenzhou spacecraft prior to flying with crew.
Y5	15 October 2003; 01:00	2F	Shenzhou 5	LEO	Yang Liwei	Success	China's first crewed spaceflight.
Y6	12 October 2005; 01:00	2F	Shenzhou 6	LEO	Fei Junlong; Nie Haisheng	Success	Second crewed spaceflight, first with two taikonauts.
Y7	25 September 2008; 13:10	2F	Shenzhou 7	LEO	Zhai Zhigang; Liu Boming; Jing Haipeng	Success	First flight with three crew members, first to feature extravehicular activity.
T1	29 September 2011; 13:16	2F/T	Tiangong 1	LEO	—N/a	Success	The first Chinese space station. Modified version Long March 2F/G with larger payload fairing.
Y8	31 October 2011; 21:58	2F/G	Shenzhou 8	LEO	—N/a	Success	Uncrewed spaceflight to test automatic rendezvous and docking with Tiangong-1
Y9	16 June 2012; 10:37	2F/G	Shenzhou 9	LEO	Jing Haipeng; Liu Wang; Liu Yang	Success	Three crew members, to test rendezvous and docking with Tiangong-1.
Y10	11 June 2013; 09:38	2F/G	Shenzhou 10	LEO	Nie Haisheng; Zhang Xiaoguang; Wang Yaping	Success	Three crew members; rendezvous and docking with Tiangong-1.
T2	15 September 2016; 14:04	2F/T	Tiangong 2	LEO	—N/a	Success	Second Chinese space laboratory Tiangong-2, launched by 2F/G variant.
Y11	16 October 2016; 23:30	2F/G	Shenzhou 11	LEO	Jing Haipeng; Chen Dong	Success	Two crew members; rendezvous and docking with Tiangong-2 for a 30-day mission.
T3	4 September 2020; 07:30	2F/T	Reusable Experimental Spacecraft	LEO	—N/a	Success	Test flight of a reusable experimental spacecraft.
Y12	17 June 2021; 01:22	2F/G	Shenzhou 12	LEO	Nie Haisheng; Liu Boming; Tang Hongbo	Success	Three crew members; first visit to Tianhe, the first module of the Chinese Space Station, for a three-month mission.
Y13	15 October 2021; 16:23	2F/G	Shenzhou 13	LEO	Zhai Zhigang; Wang Yaping; Ye Guangfu	Success	Three crew members; visited Tianhe to continue construction of the space station for a six-month mission.
Y14	5 June 2022; 02:44	2F/G	Shenzhou 14	LEO	Chen Dong; Liu Yang; Cai Xuzhe	Success	Three crew members; rendezvous and docking with the Chinese space station for a six-month mission.
T4	4 August 2022; 16:00	2F/T	Reusable Experimental Spacecraft	LEO	—N/a	Success	Second test flight of a reusable experimental spacecraft.
Y15	29 November 2022; 15:08	2F/G	Shenzhou 15	LEO	Fei Junlong; Deng Qingming; Zhang Lu	Success	Three crew members; rendezvous and docking with the Chinese space station for a six-month mission.
Y16	30 May 2023; 01:31	2F/G	Shenzhou 16	LEO	Jing Haipeng; Zhu Yangzhu; Gui Haichao	Success	Three crew members; rendezvous and docking with the Chinese space station for a six-month mission.
Y17	26 October 2023; 03:13	2F/G	Shenzhou 17	LEO	Tang Hongbo; Tang Shengjie; Jiang Xinlin	Success	Three crew members; rendezvous and docking with the Chinese space station for a six-month mission.
T5	14 December 2023; 14:12	2F/T	Reusable Experimental Spacecraft	LEO	—N/a	Success	Third test flight of a reusable experimental spacecraft.
Y18	25 April 2024; 12:59	2F/G	Shenzhou 18	LEO	Ye Guangfu; Li Cong; Li Guangsu	Success	Three crew members; rendezvous and docking with the Chinese space station for a six-month mission.
Y19	29 October 2024; 20:27	2F/G	Shenzhou 19	LEO	Cai Xuzhe; Song Lingdong; Wang Haoze	Success	Three crew members; rendezvous and docking with the Chinese space station for a six-month mission.
Y20	24 April 2025; 09:17	2F/G	Shenzhou 20	LEO	Chen Dong; Chen Zhongrui; Wang Jie	Success	Three crew members; rendezvous and docking with the Chinese space station for a six-month mission.
Y21	31 October 2025; 15:44	2F/G	Shenzhou 21	LEO	Zhang Lu; Wu Fei; Zhang Hongzhang	Success	Three crew members; rendezvous and docking with the Chinese space station for a six-month mission.
Y22	25 November 2025; 04:11	2F/G	Shenzhou 22	LEO	—N/a	Success	Replacement Spacecraft for return Shenzhou 21 crew.
T6	7 February 2026; 03:57	2F/T	Reusable Experimental Spacecraft	LEO	—N/a	Success	4th flight of the reusable spacecraft.
Y23	24 May 2026; 15:08	2F/G	Shenzhou 23	LEO	Zhu Yangzhu; Zhang Zhiyuan; Lai Ka-ying	Success	Three crew members; rendezvous and docking with the Chinese space station for a six-month mission.
Y24	25 November 2026	2F/G	Shenzhou 24	LEO	TBA; TBA; TBA	Planned	Three crew members; rendezvous and docking with the Chinese space station for a six-month mission.
Y25	April 2027	2F/G	Shenzhou 25	LEO	TBA; TBA; TBA	Planned	Three crew members; rendezvous and docking with the Chinese space station for a six-month mission.
Y26	October 2027	2F/G	Shenzhou 26	LEO	TBA; TBA; TBA	Planned	Three crew members; rendezvous and docking with the Chinese space station for a six-month mission.

== See also ==
- List of Long March launches (2025-2029)
