= Shenzhou 23 =

Chinese crewed spaceflight to the Tiangong space station

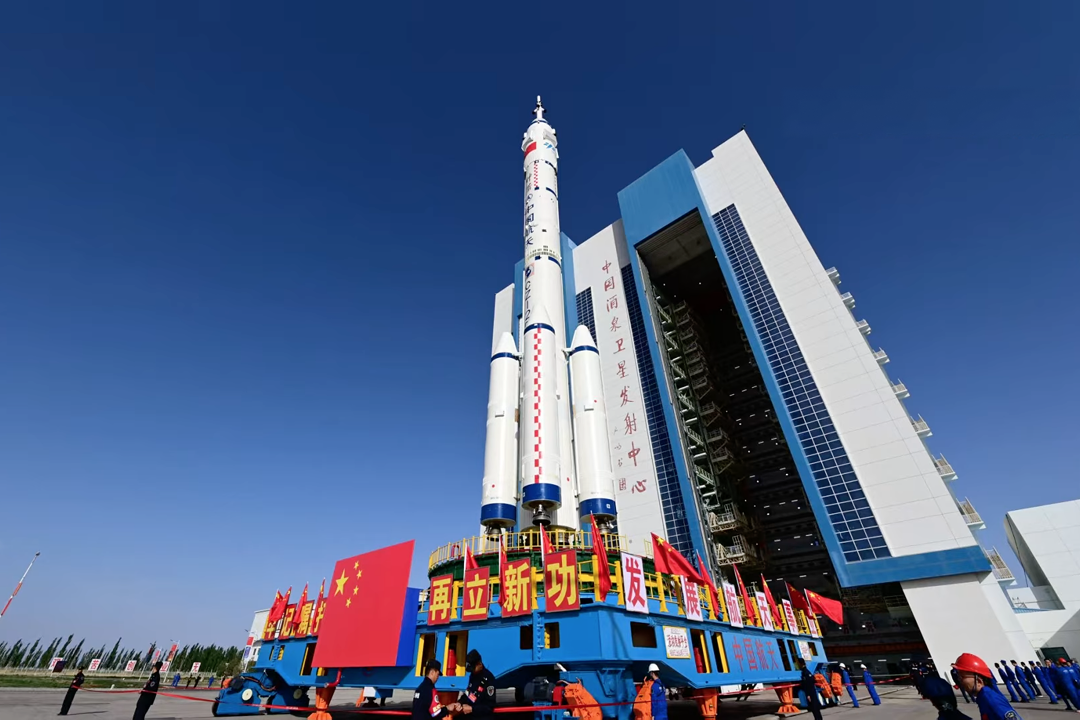
- Rollout of Shenzhou 23 atop a Long March 2F/G
- Mission type: Tiangong space station crew transport
- Operator: China Manned Space Agency
- COSPAR ID: 2026-113A
- SATCAT no.: 69180
- Mission duration: 179 days, 15 hours, 15 minutes (in progress); 180 days (planned)

Spacecraft properties
- Spacecraft type: Shenzhou
- Manufacturer: China Aerospace Science and Technology Corporation

Crew
- Crew size: 3
- Members: Zhu Yangzhu; Zhang Zhiyuan; Lai Ka-ying
- EVAs: 1
- EVA duration: 5 hours, 30 minutes

Start of mission
- Launch date: 24 May 2026, 15:08:36 UTC (23:08:36 CST)
- Rocket: Long March 2F/G (Y23)
- Launch site: Jiuquan, LA-4/SLS-1
- Contractor: China Academy of Launch Vehicle Technology

End of mission
- Landing date: 30 November 2026 (planned)
- Landing site: Inner Mongolia (planned)

Orbital parameters
- Reference system: Geocentric orbit
- Regime: Low Earth orbit
- Perigee altitude: 379 km (235 mi)
- Apogee altitude: 389 km (242 mi)
- Inclination: 41.47°

Docking with Tiangong space station
- Docking port: Tianhe nadir
- Docking date: 24 May 2026, 18:45 UTC
- Undocking date: 30 November 2026 (planned)
- Time docked: 179 days, 11 hours, 39 minutes (in progress)
- Mission insignia Shenzhou program

Shenzhou 23 (simplified Chinese: 神舟二十三号; traditional Chinese: 神舟二十三號; pinyin: Shénzhōu èrshísān hào) is an ongoing Chinese spaceflight to transport three taikonauts on a Shenzhou spacecraft to and from the Tiangong space station. The mission is the 17th crewed Chinese spaceflight and the 23rd flight overall of the Shenzhou program.

== Background ==
Originally expected to launch around November 2026, the launch of Shenzhou 23 was brought up to May 2026 due to the early launch of its predecessor Shenzhou 22. It is the 11th crewed flight to the Tiangong space station, and is expected to last approximately 6 months.

== Mission ==
On 19 January 2026, China Central Television reported that the Shenzhou 23 spacecraft had arrived at the Jiuquan Satellite Launch Center about two months ahead of the original schedule. The spacecraft for Shenzhou 24 is also expected to be completed by summer, restoring the "launch-on-need" capability similar to that demonstrated during Shenzhou 22. The early delivery of both spacecraft, along with their Long March 2F launch vehicles, ensures that a backup mission can be prepared on short notice if required.

The mission launched aboard a Long March 2F rocket and docked with the nadir port of the Tianhe core module of the Tiangong space station.

Unlike previous six-month missions, the CMSA has announced that one astronaut from Shenzhou 23 is expected to stay in space for a full year. This would allow a Pakistani astronaut to visit Tiangong during the Shenzhou 24 mission scheduled for October 2026.

== Crew ==
In keeping with previous Chinese crewed missions, the crew was announced one day before the planned launch date. The mission is being commanded by Zhu Yangzhu, who previously flew on Shenzhou 16. He is responsible for the whole mission and completion of mission objectives. Zhang Zhiyuan is a former air force pilot, his responsibility will be completing the mission objectives and assisting during spaceflight operations. Lai Ka-ying became the first person from Hong Kong (Note: William Anders, who flew on Apollo 8 and took the iconic Earthrise photograph, was born in British Hong Kong to American parents, but left as an infant and did not acquire residence in Hong Kong.) to travel to space, serving as a payload specialist. She will conduct the science experiments aboard the space station and management and maintenance of payloads.

One member of the crew is expected to remain aboard the station for approximately one year alongside two members of Shenzhou 24. The selection will be determined later in the mission based on physical and psychological evaluations. This arrangement would allow a Pakistani astronaut, either Muhammad Zeeshan Ali or Khurram Daud, to make a short-duration visit to the station, launching with Shenzhou 24 and returning roughly one week later with two members of the Shenzhou 23 crew.

Position	Launching crew	Landing crew
Commander	Zhu Yangzhu, PLAAC; Second spaceflight	TBA
Pilot	Zhang Zhiyuan, PLAAC; First spaceflight	TBA
Payload specialist	Lai Ka-ying, CMSA; First spaceflight	TBA
Spaceflight participant	—	TBA (Muhammad Zeeshan Ali or Khurram Daud), SUPARCO; First spaceflight
