= Zhou Jianping =

Chinese aerospace engineer

- 周建平
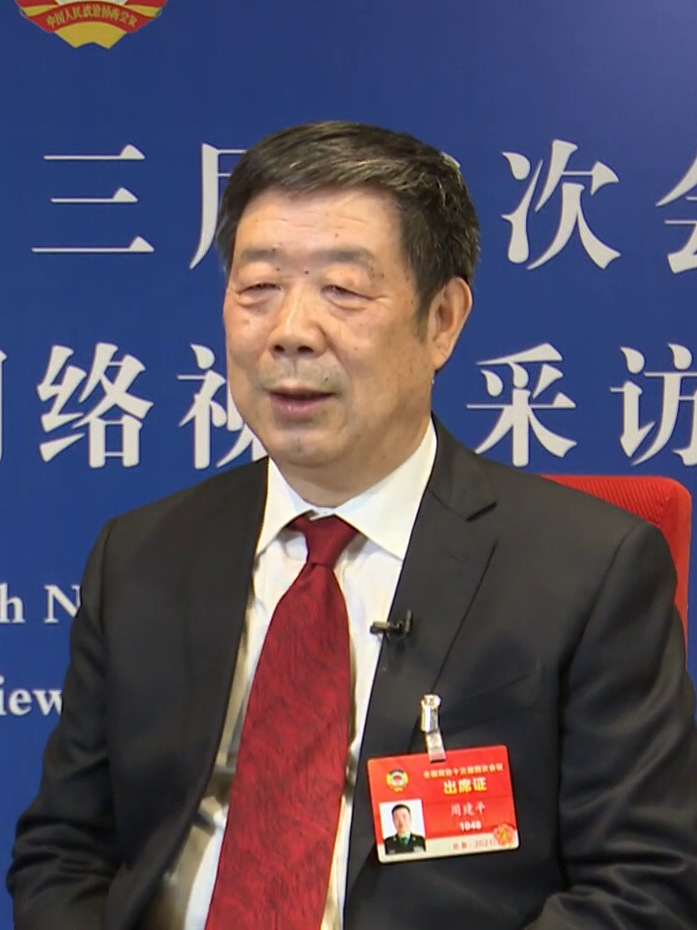
- Born: January 13, 1957 (age 69); Wangcheng County, Changsha, China
- Education: Dalian University of Technology; National University of Defense Technology
- Scientific career
- Fields: Astronautics
- Workplaces: Shenzhou program

Zhou Jianping (Chinese: 周建平; pinyin: Zhōu Jiànpíng; born January 13, 1957) is a Chinese aerospace engineer who is the chief designer of China Manned Space Program. He belongs to the 3rd generation of Chinese space engineers. He was a member of the 12th National Committee of the Chinese People's Political Consultative Conference.

== Biography ==
Zhou was born in Wangcheng County (now Wangcheng District of Changsha), Hunan province in 1957. After the resumption of college entrance examination, he was admitted to Dalian University of Technology, where he obtained his master's degree in engineering mechanics in 1984. He received his doctor's degree in solid mechanics from National University of Defense Technology in October 1989. He joined the CMS in April 2000. In October 2019, he was elected chief designer of Shenzhou program.

== Honours and awards ==
- 1999 Distinguished Young Scholar by the National Science Fund for Distinguished Young Scholars
- 2013 Member of the Chinese Academy of Engineering (CAE)
- 2016 Guanghua Engineering Science and Technology Award
