= Pan Zhanchun =

Chinese pilot

- 潘占春
- Space career

PLAAC astronaut
- Previous occupation: People's Liberation Army Air Force fighter pilot
- Status: Retired
- Selection: Chinese Group 1 (1998)
- Missions: None
- Retired: 2014

Pan Zhanchun (simplified Chinese: 潘占春; traditional Chinese: 潘佔春) is a Chinese pilot selected as part of the Shenzhou program. He was a fighter pilot in the People's Liberation Army Air Force and was selected to be an astronaut in 1998.

Pan Zhanchun retired from the Astronaut Corps in 2014.

== Sources ==
- Pan Zhanchun at the Encyclopedia Astronautica. Accessed 23 July 2005.
- Spacefacts biography of Pan Zhanchun
