= Zhao Chuandong =

- 赵传东
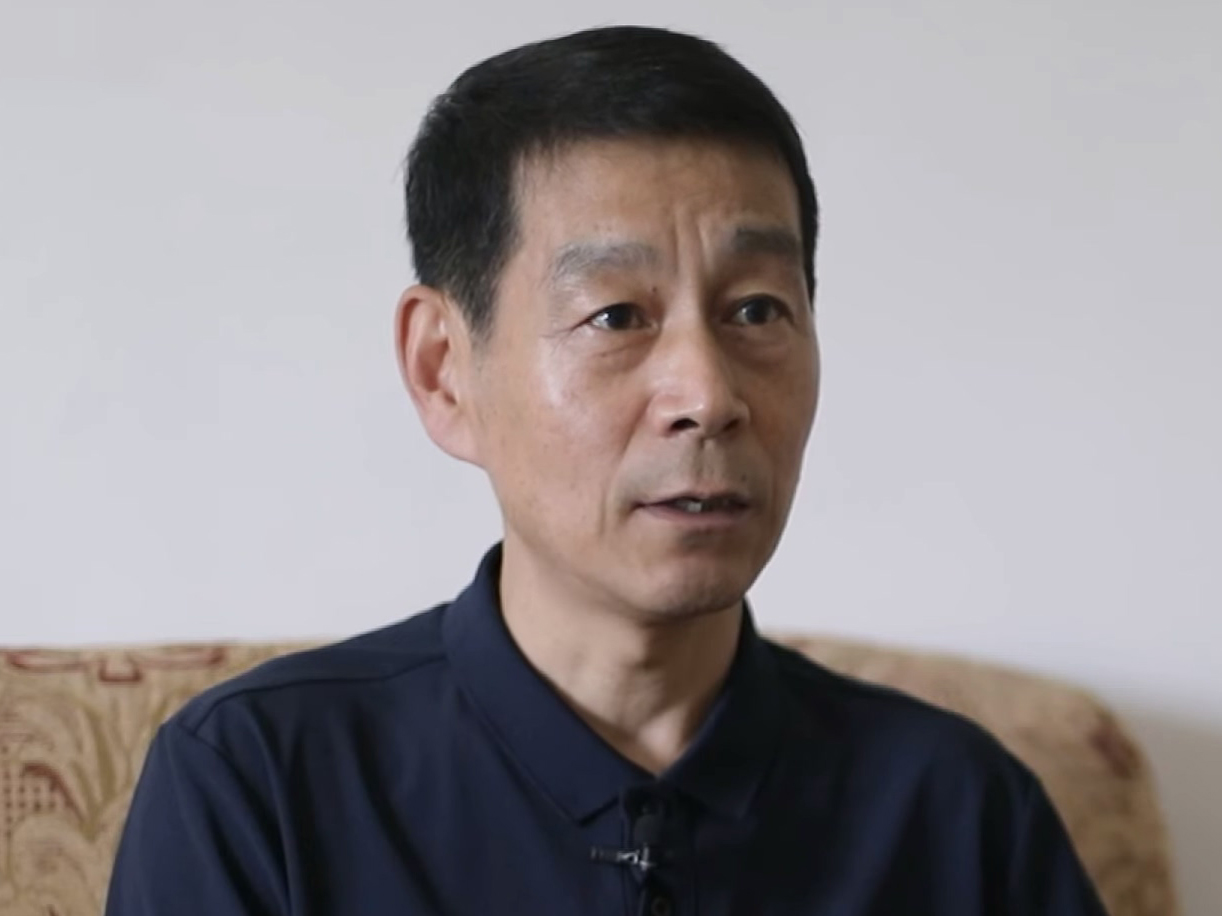
- Zhao Chuandong
- Space career

PLAAC astronaut
- Previous occupation: People's Liberation Army Air Force fighter pilot
- Status: Retired
- Selection: Chinese Group 1 (1998)
- Missions: None
- Retired: 2014

Zhao Chuandong (simplified Chinese: 赵传东; traditional Chinese: 趙傳東) is a Chinese pilot selected as part of the Shenzhou program. A fighter pilot in the People's Liberation Army Air Force, he was selected to be an astronaut in 1998.

Zhao Chuandong retired from the Astronaut Corps in 2014.
