= Lai Ka-ying =

Hong Kong astronaut (born 1982)

- 黎家盈
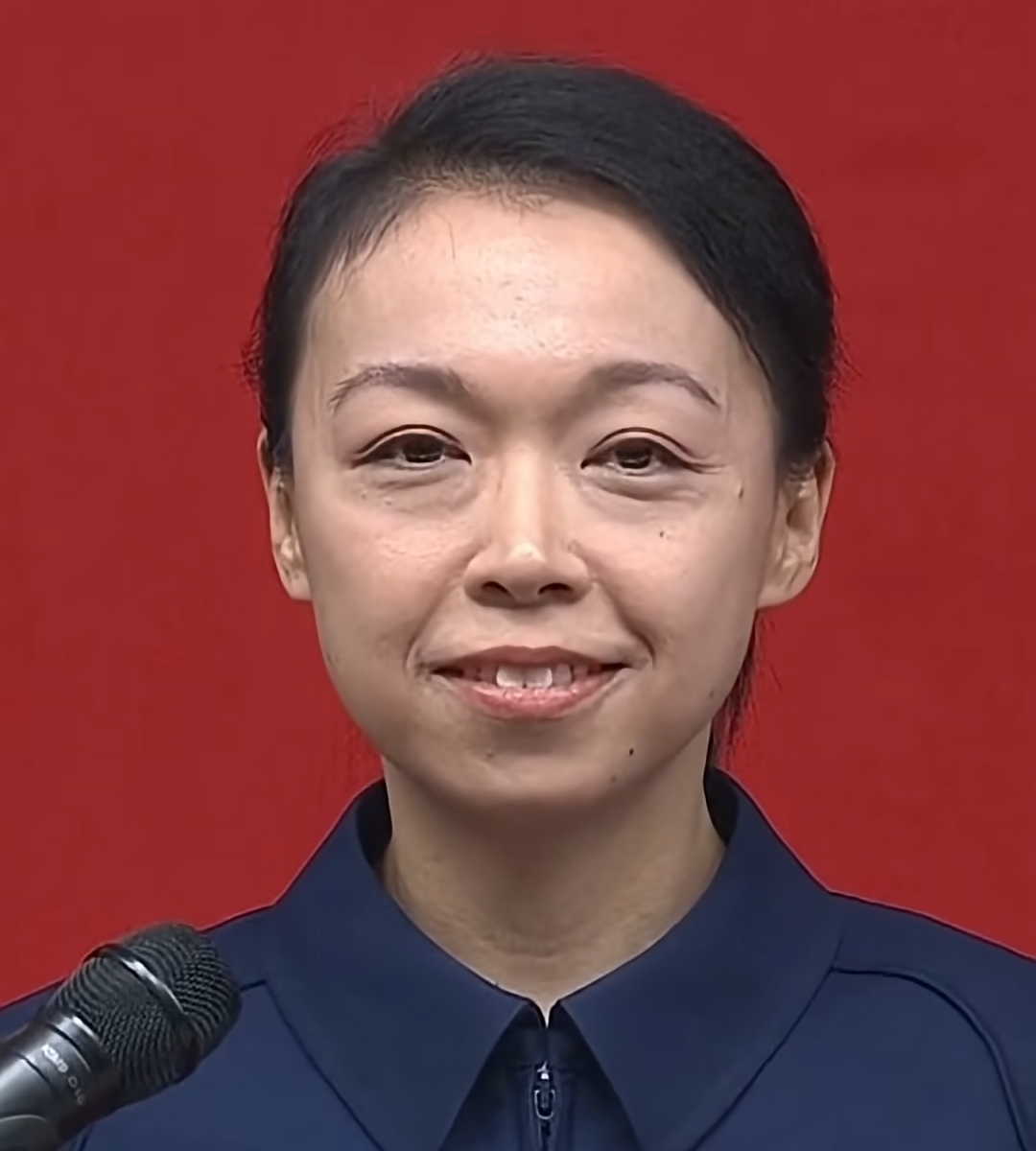
- Lai in 2026
- Born: November 1982 (age 43); Hong Kong
- Education: University of Hong Kong (BSc, MPhil, PhD)
- Space career

PLAAC astronaut
- Previous occupation: Superintendent, Hong Kong Police Force
- Status: Active
- Time in space: 133 days, 5 hours, 2 minutes (currently in space)
- Selection: Chinese Group 4 (2022)
- Missions: Shenzhou 23
- Scientific career
- Fields: Computer science
- Thesis: Profiling internet pirates. (2011)
- Doctoral advisor: Chow Kam-pui

Lai Ka-ying (Chinese: 黎家盈; pinyin: Lí Jiāyíng; Jyutping: Lai^{4} Gaa^{1}jing^{4}; born November 1982) is a Hong Kong astronaut who is a member of the Shenzhou 23 mission to the Tiangong space station. She is Hong Kong's first astronaut, (Note: Astronaut Bill Anders was born in Hong Kong to American parents, but left as an infant. He was an American astronaut for the NASA Apollo 8 mission.) the fourth Chinese woman in space, and China's first female payload specialist. She was a superintendent in the Hong Kong Police Force.

== Biography ==
Lai Ka-ying was born in British Hong Kong in November 1982; her ancestral home is Shunde, Guangdong. She majored in computer science and information systems at the University of Hong Kong, graduating with a Bachelor of Science in 2004, and later pursued a Master of Philosophy from 2004 to 2006 and earned a doctorate in 2011, both from the University of Hong Kong, specializing in computer forensics.

Lai joined the Technical Services Division of the Hong Kong Police Force, where she reached the rank of superintendent.

Reports in May 2024 stated that a female Hong Kong police officer with a doctorate in computer science and experience in information technology had been selected as a payload specialist in China's fourth group of astronauts. The reports stated that Lai had been seconded to the Security Bureau and sent to Beijing for astronaut training.

In 2026, Lai was assigned to the Shenzhou 23 mission of the China Manned Space Program. The mission launched on 24 May 2026, with Lai serving as the mission's payload specialist. She became Hong Kong's first astronaut. She was also the first astronaut from China's fourth astronaut selection group to fly on a spaceflight mission.

== See also ==
- List of Chinese astronauts
- Hong Kong Space Museum
