= Zhu Yangzhu =

Chinese engineer and taikonaut (born 1986)

- 朱杨柱
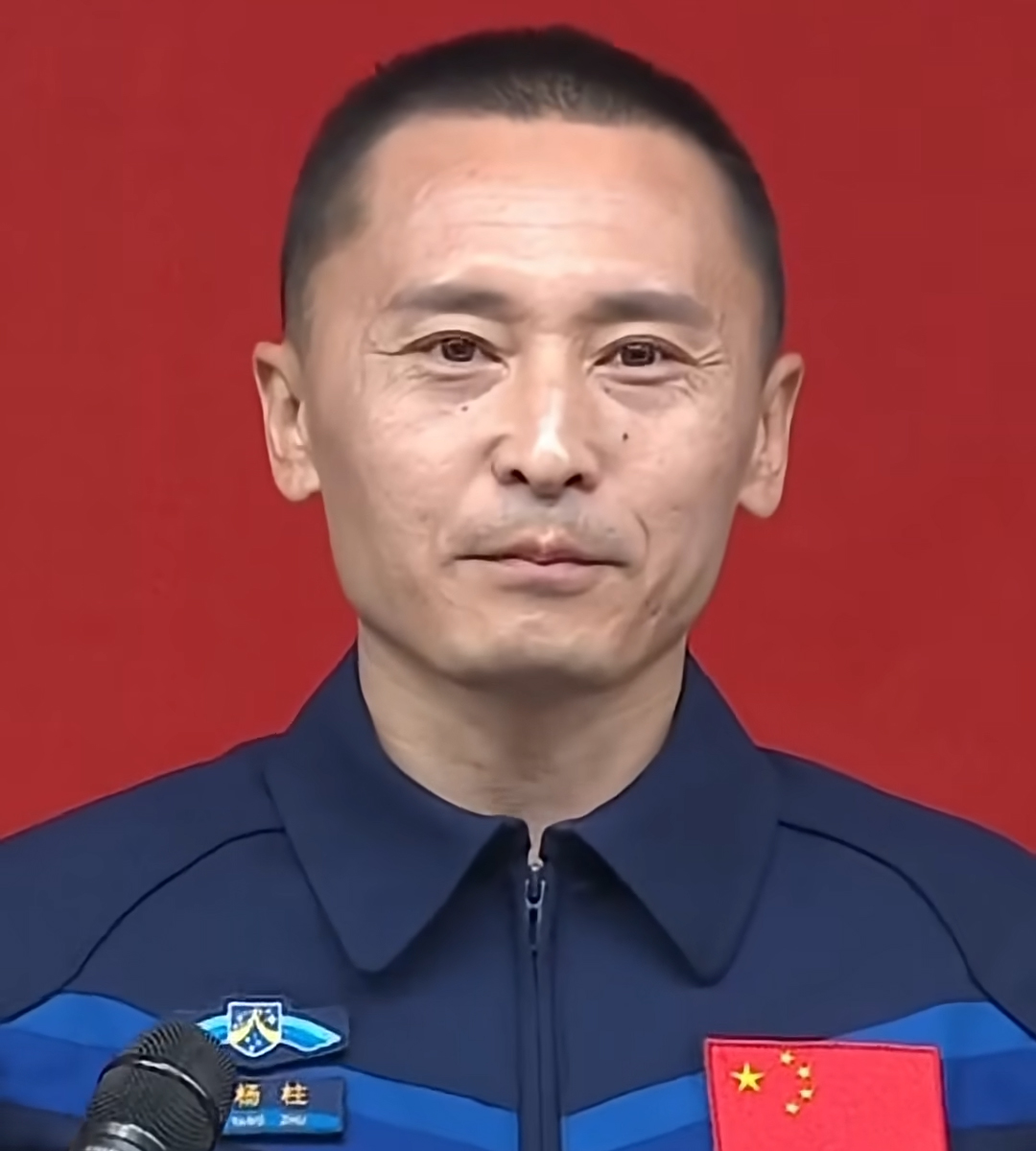
- Zhu Yangzhu in 2026
- Born: September 1986 (age 40); Pei County, Jiangsu, China
- Education: National University of Defence Technology
- Occupations: Senior colonel, People's Liberation Army Ground Force
- Space career

PLAAC astronaut
- Previous occupation: Associate Professor, PLA Strategic Support Force Space Engineering University
- Status: Active
- Time in space: 287 days, 4 hours, 12 minutes (currently in space)
- Selection: Chinese Group 3 (2020)
- Total EVAs: 1
- Total EVA time: 13 hours, 25 minutes
- Missions: Shenzhou 16; Shenzhou 23

Chinese name
- Simplified Chinese: 朱杨柱
- Traditional Chinese: 朱楊柱
Transcriptions
Standard Mandarin
- Hanyu Pinyin: Zhū Yáng Zhù

Zhu Yangzhu (Chinese: 朱杨柱; born September 1986) is a Chinese engineer and astronaut selected as part of the Shenzhou program. He enlisted in the People's Liberation Army (PLA) in September 2005, and joined the Chinese Communist Party (CCP) in December 2006.

== Early life and education ==
Yangzhu was born in Pei County, Xuzhou, Jiangsu, in September 1986. As a teenager he wanted to be a pilot and applied to the Air Force when he was in high school; but he did not pass the entrance exam there. On the advice of teachers and parents he registered the National Defense Science and Technology University in Changsha as his choice of college when he graduated from high school. Zhu Yangzhu did very well in high school and was accepted in Changsha in September 2005 without any further entrance exams. Like all students since the 1989/1990 academic year, he was accepted into the university under the Central Military Commission automatically enlisted in the People's Liberation Army Land Forces, although he studied at the Faculty of Aerospace Engineering Missile Design (飞行器系统与工程).

== Research and teaching ==
In his fourth year of college, when he was preparing for his diploma exam, Zhu Yangzhu learned that the air force was recruiting pilots from college graduates. He then applied again for a career in aviation. This time he passed most of the tests in the entrance exam, but failed in the end. He remained and completed his postdoctoral at National Institute of Defence Technology and then devoted himself to research, first in the field of aerodynamics, then in the field of fluid dynamics. As a result, his field of expertise had shifted from aviation to space travel, and in 2017 he joined the Academy of Aerospace Engineering as an associate professor (副教授). The academy had emerged from the Academy for Equipment of the People's Liberation Army Strategic Support Force, headquartered in Huairou north of Beijing. In the meantime he had attained the rank of colonel in the army.

== Space career ==
On 23 April 2018, the Bureau of Human Spaceflight and the China Spaceman Training Center launched a third-class spaceman recruitment campaign in connection with the then-under development China Space Station. Unlike the 1998 and 2010 selection groups, the search was not just for fighter pilots, but also for engineers who were needed for maintenance and repairs on the station, as well as scientists from Chinese research institutes and universities who were to supervise the payloads. One of the institutions contacted for this was the University of Aerospace Engineering. Zhu Yangzhu volunteered immediately, but given his twice unsuccessful applications for the aviation service, he had little hope of being accepted. This time, however, he passed the three-stage selection process and was inducted into the People's Liberation Army Astronaut Corps in September 2020. The official swearing-in ceremony took place on 1 October 2020, the Chinese National Day.

On 29 April 2021, half a year after the swearing-in, construction of the Chinese space station began with the launch of the Tianhe core module. The 2020 selection group had relatively little time to prepare for their missions – the construction time for the station was only a year and a half. However, the scientists in the group had the advantage over the fighter pilots of the early years that they already had good prior knowledge of higher mathematics, flight dynamics, etc. This is how Zhu Yangzhu was able to complete the theoretical mechanics lesson finish in a morning. In his role as an engineer, Zhu Yangzhu is primarily responsible for repairs, both to the systems of the space station and to the laboratory cabinets. External payloads are typically mounted using a mechanical arm without astronauts having to leave the station. However, some payloads will not fit into the standardized sockets and spacewalks will continue to be required even after construction is complete. For this, Zhu Yangzhu had to train in the pool like all his colleagues, which in itself is very strenuous. However, since he was in good physical condition, underwater training was relatively easy for him.

=== Space career ===
In June 2022 he was selected as the flight engineer of the Shenzhou 16 mission to the Tiangong space station, which launched on 30 May 2023 and returned on 31 October 2023.

On 24 May 2026, Zhu returned to space as the commander of the Shenzhou 23 mission to Tiangong.

== See also ==
- List of Chinese astronauts
- Chinese space programme
