= Zhang Zhiyuan (astronaut) =

Chinese astronaut (born 1982)

- 张志远
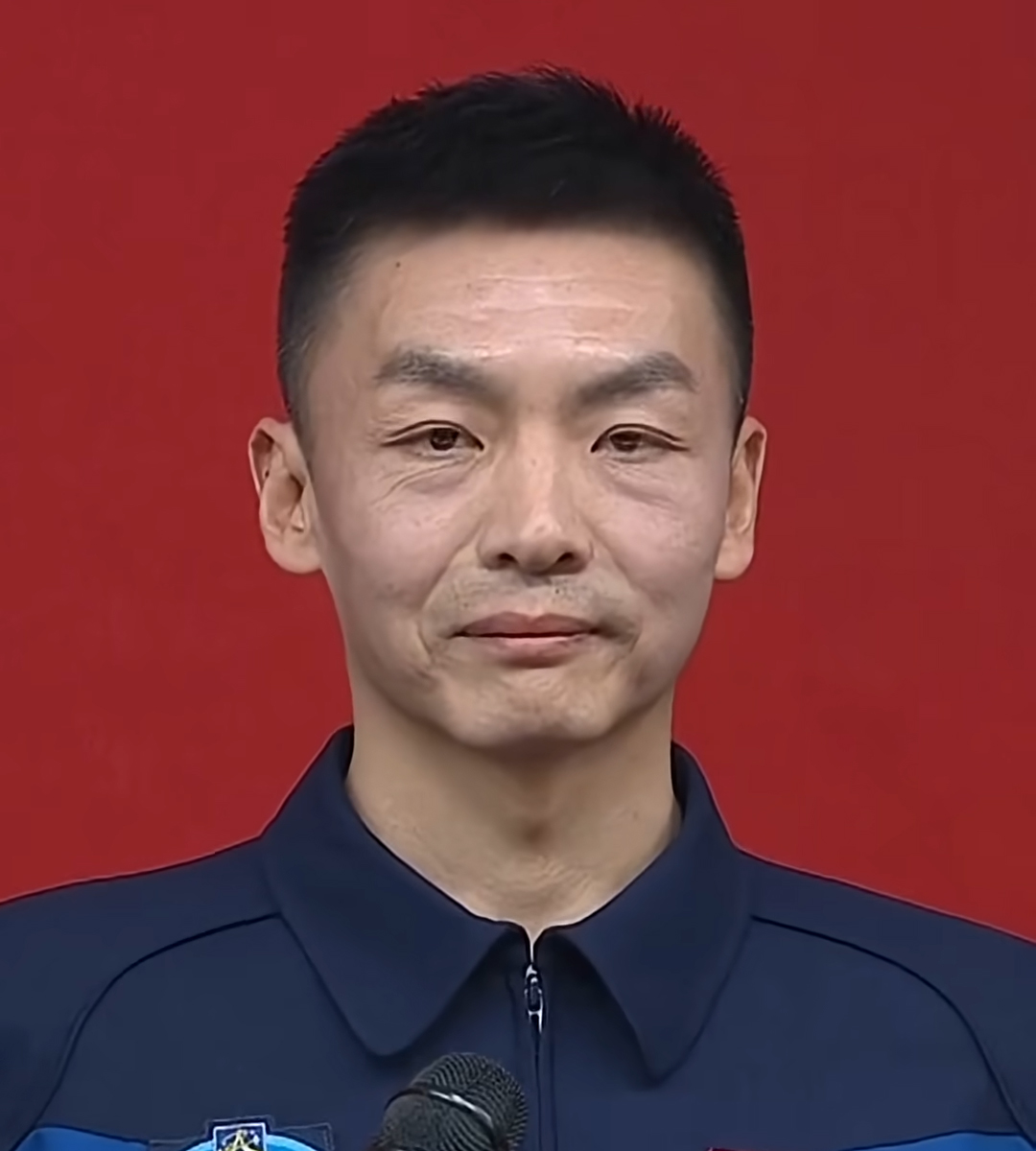
- Zhang Zhiyuan in 2026
- Born: June 1986 (age 40); Baiyin, Gansu, China
- Education: People's Liberation Army Air Force Aviation University
- Space career

PLAAC astronaut
- Previous occupation: Pilot
- Status: Active
- Rank: Colonel, People's Liberation Army Air Force
- Time in space: 133 days, 5 hours, 31 minutes (currently in space)
- Selection: Chinese Group 3 (2020)
- Total EVAs: 1
- Total EVA time: 5 hours, 30 minutes
- Missions: Shenzhou 23

Zhang Zhiyuan (Chinese: 张志远; born June 1986) is a Chinese astronaut from Baiyin, Gansu. Prior to joining the astronaut corps, he joined the military in September 2006 and later graduated from the People's Liberation Army Air Force Aviation University. Zhang became a member of the Chinese Communist Party in March 2011. In 2018, he applied for and was selected into China's third astronaut corps. He was selected to participate in the Shenzhou 23 mission to the Tiangong space station.

== See also ==
- List of Chinese astronauts
