= Chinese space program =

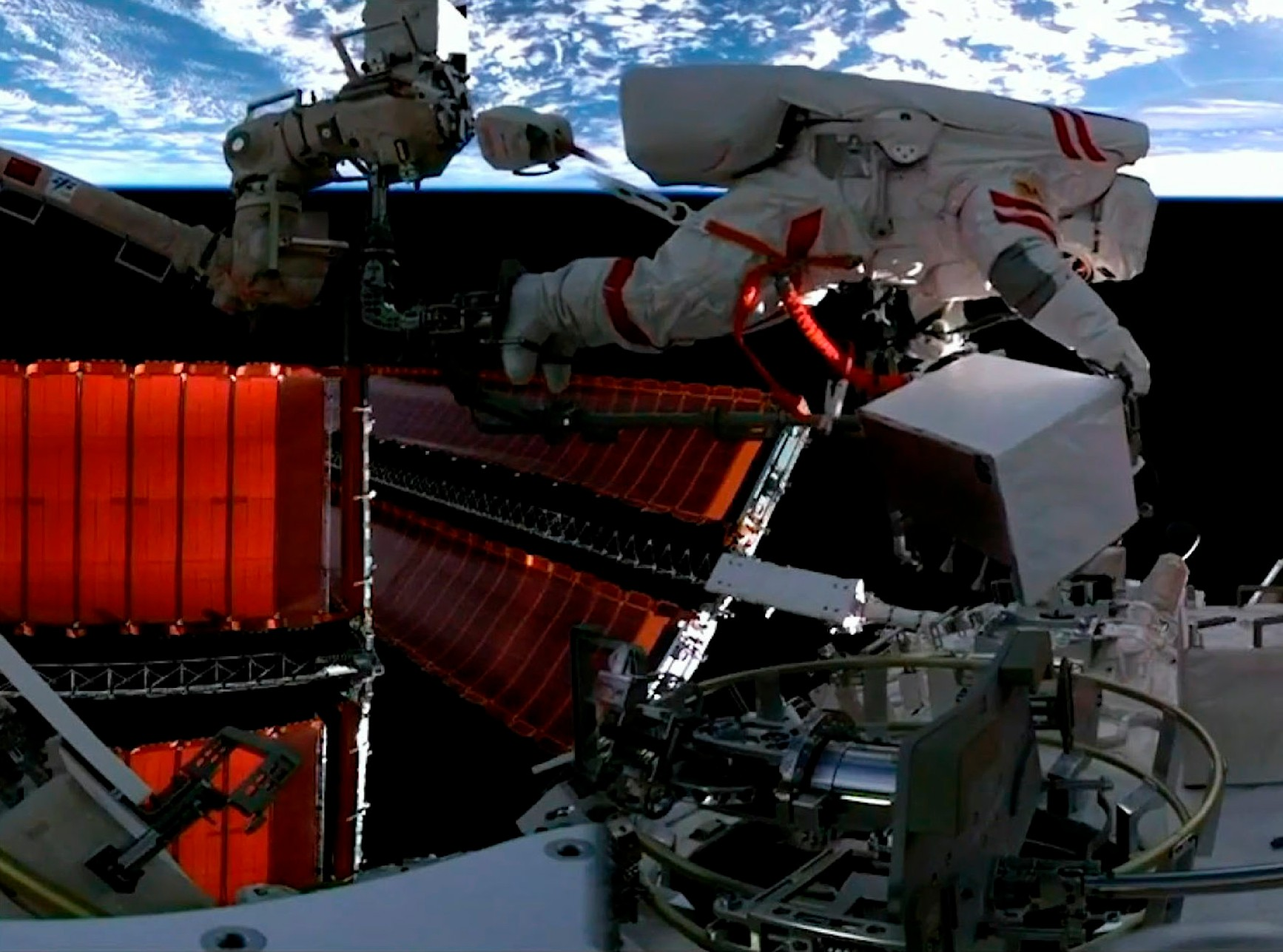
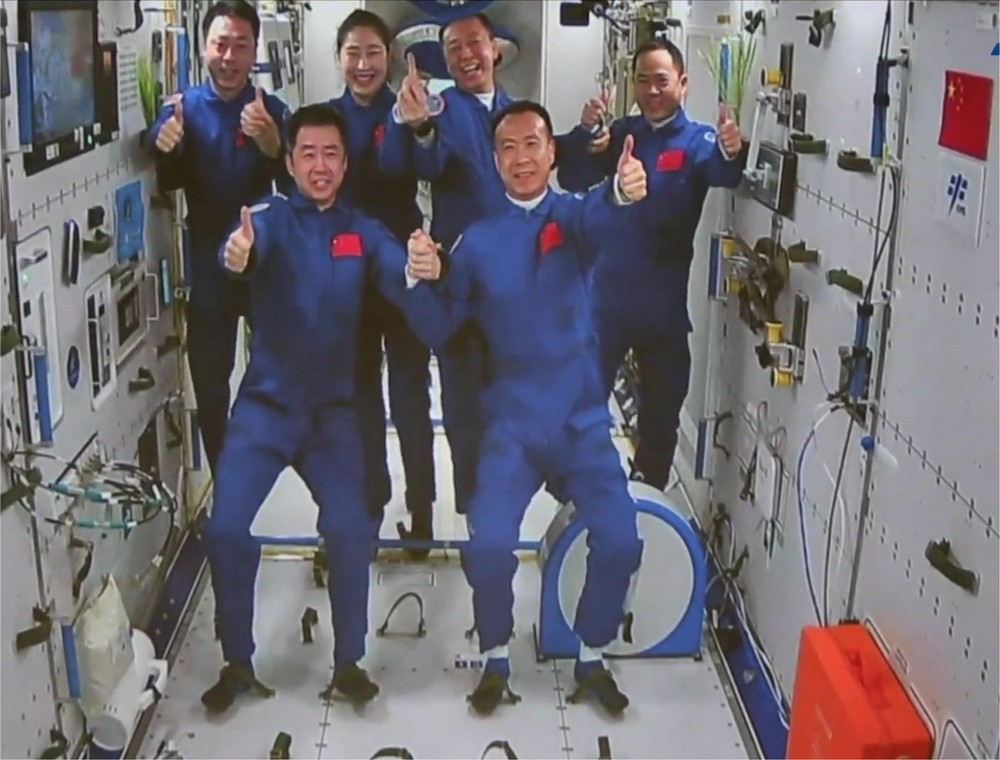
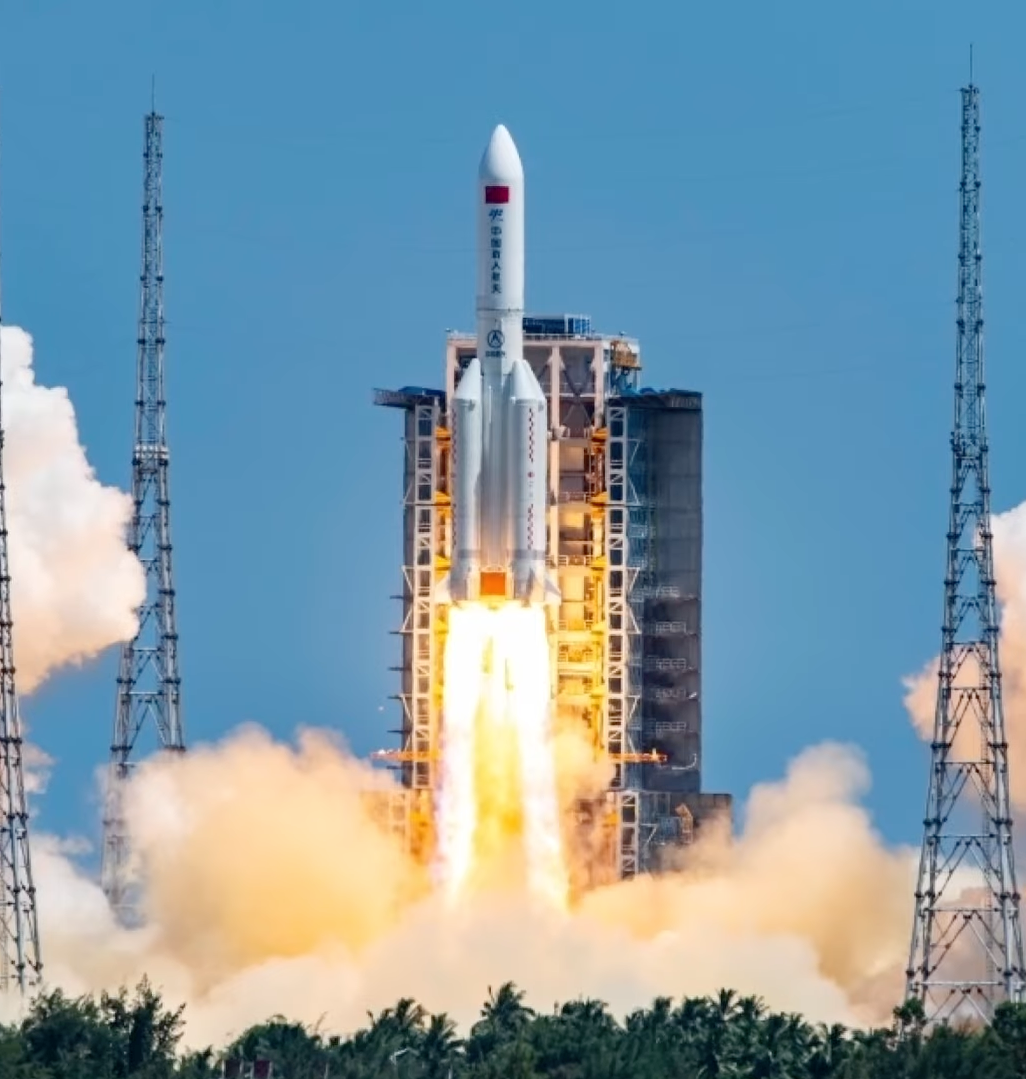
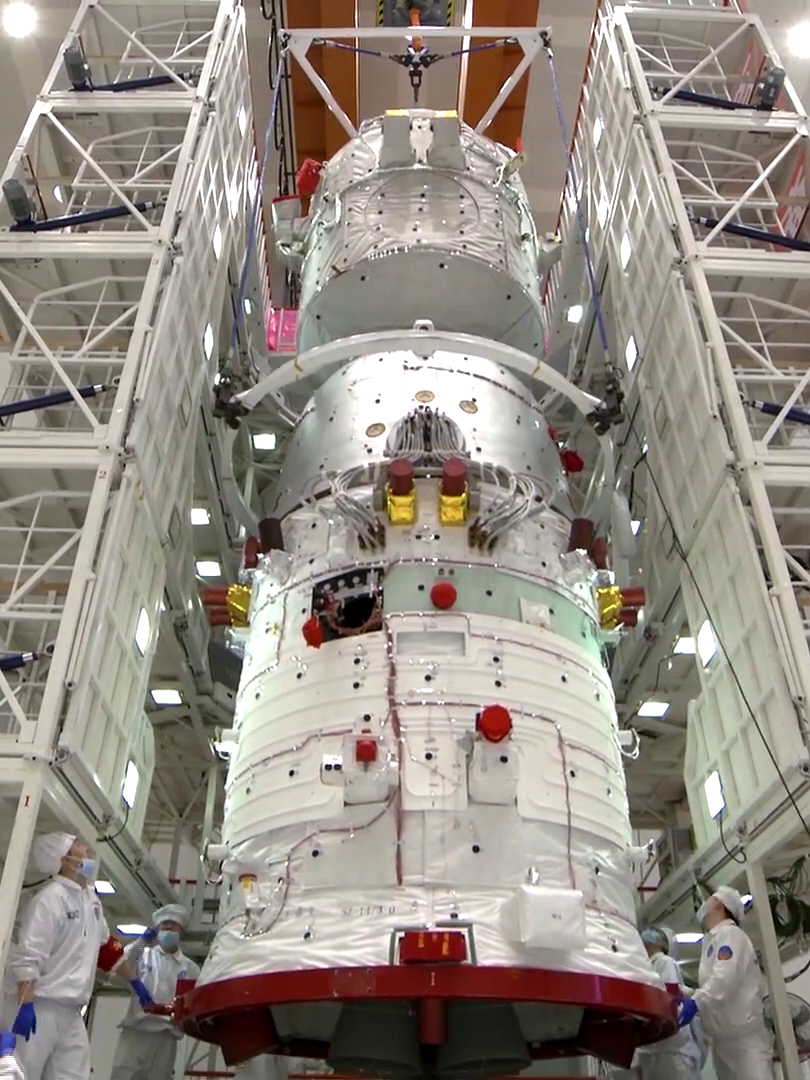
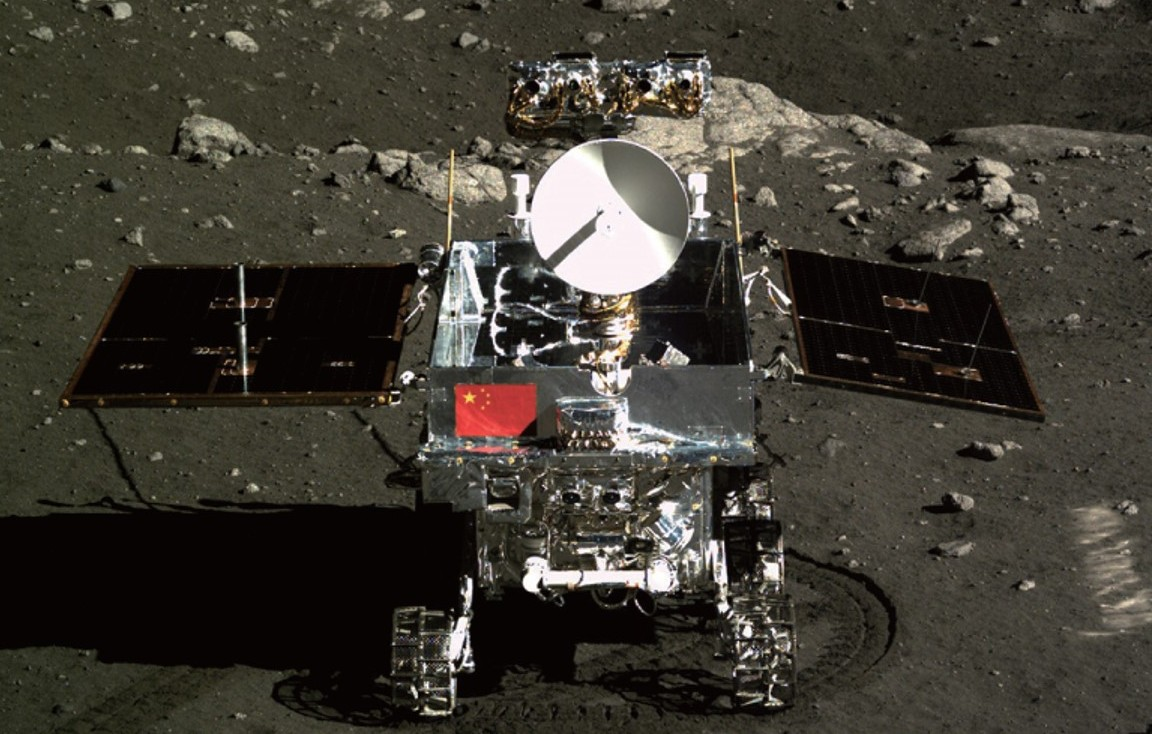
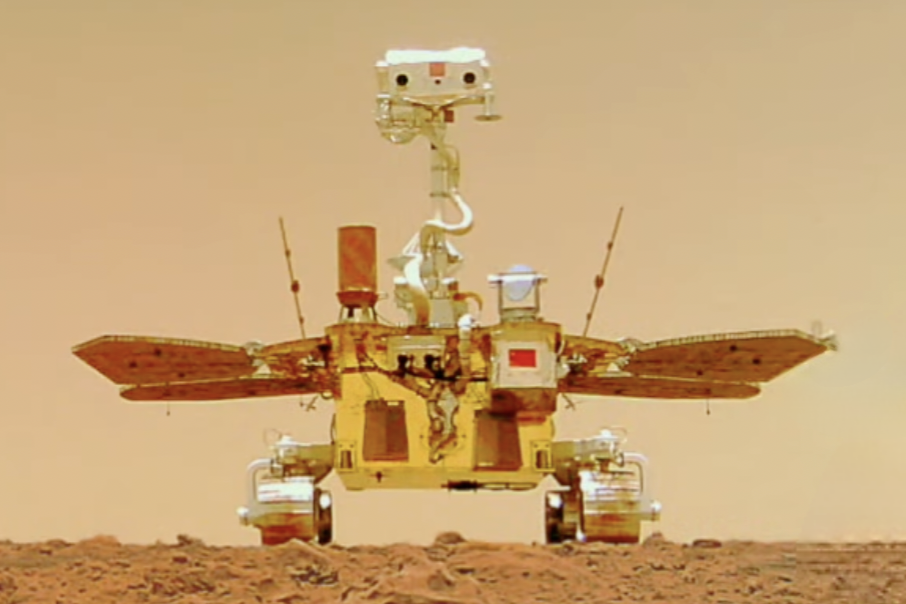
From left to right, top to bottom: Fei Junlong conducting a spacewalk from the Tiangong space station, Shenzhou 14 and 15 crews aboard Tiangong, Long March 5B launching Wentian, Shenzhou crewed spacecraft, Yutu lunar rover, Zhurong rover on Mars.

China has one of the most active space programs in the world. With launch vehicles of the Long March rocket family and four spaceports (Jiuquan, Taiyuan, Xichang, Wenchang), China conducts the most or second most orbital launches each year, and is one of three countries with a human spaceflight capability. (Note: Alongside the United States and Russia) China's fleet of over 1,300 Earth orbit satellites serves communication, navigation, reconnaissance and scientific research. China Manned Space Program operates Tiangong, one of two active space stations alongside the International Space Station (ISS). Most space operations are conducted by civilian China National Space Administration (CNSA) and the military People's Liberation Army Aerospace Force (PLAASF). CNSA has achieved robotic rover, lander, and orbiter missions to the Moon and Mars. PLAASF directs the Astronaut Corps and its Deep Space Network.

From the 1950s, aided by the Soviet Union, development began on China's nuclear weapons, Dongfeng ballistic missiles, and Long March rockets, honored as the Two Bombs, One Satellite projects. Despite setbacks from the Cultural Revolution and Sino-Soviet split, China became the fifth country to independently launch a satellite, Dong Fang Hong 1 in 1970. China developed the Shenzhou crewed craft from Russia's Soyuz after a 1995 treaty; Shenzhou 5 carried the first Chinese astronaut in 2003. China commercially launched Western satellites from 1988, but failures, especially Intelsat 708, caused the US to embargo satellite export in 1998. After the US vetoed its joining the ISS, China began the Tiangong program, operating prototypes Tiangong-1 and -2 before the current Tiangong, the world's third modular space station. (Note: After ISS and the Soviet/Russian 1986–2001 Mir.) Since the 2020s, the program has been contrasted against Western space programs as the "New Space Race".

China's Moon missions achieved the world's first far side landing (Chang'e 4), far side sample return (Chang'e 6), and longest-lived rover (Yutu-2). China's interplanetary missions deployed Tianwen-1, a Mars orbiter, lander, and the rover Zhurong; Tianwen-2 visited an asteroid in 2026 and will visit a comet in 2035. Its satellite constellations include BeiDou Navigation, Gaofen Observation, and the Guowang and Qianfan internet constellations. Long March 5 is the most powerful rocket operating outside of the US, and first Long March to not use hypergolic propellant.

Since 2019, China's private and state enterprises have made over a hundred launches with new rocket designs, such as the Kuaizhou family and Ceres-1. China is developing reusable spacecraft, including the Long March 10 rocket family and a military spaceplane. China plans a crewed lunar landing by 2030, using the under-development Mengzhou craft, Lanyue lander, and Long March 10 rocket. After scouting with Chang'e 7 and 8, China aims to construct the International Lunar Research Station at the lunar south pole from 2031, collaborating with Roscosmos and 11 other countries; China previously cooperated with the European Space Agency on deep space tracking and space science. The Tianwen-3 robotic Mars sample-return is scheduled for dual launches in 2028, and the Tianwen-4 Jupiter orbiter and Uranus flyby in 2029; the Shensuo probes aim to flyby Neptune.

== History ==
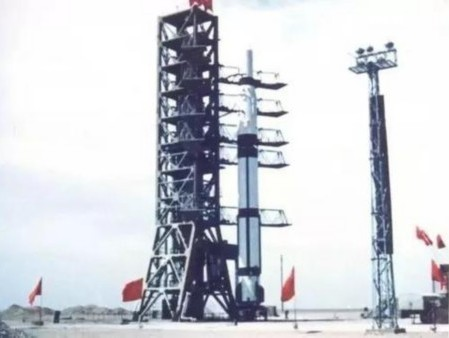
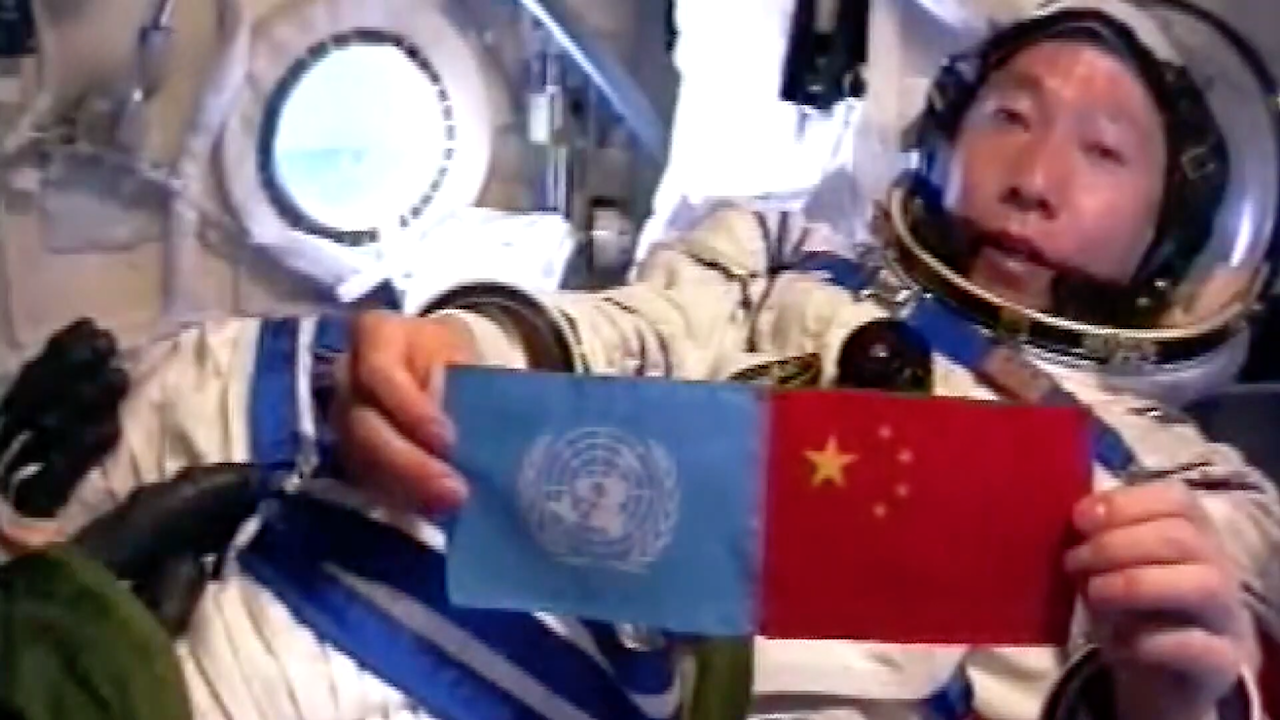
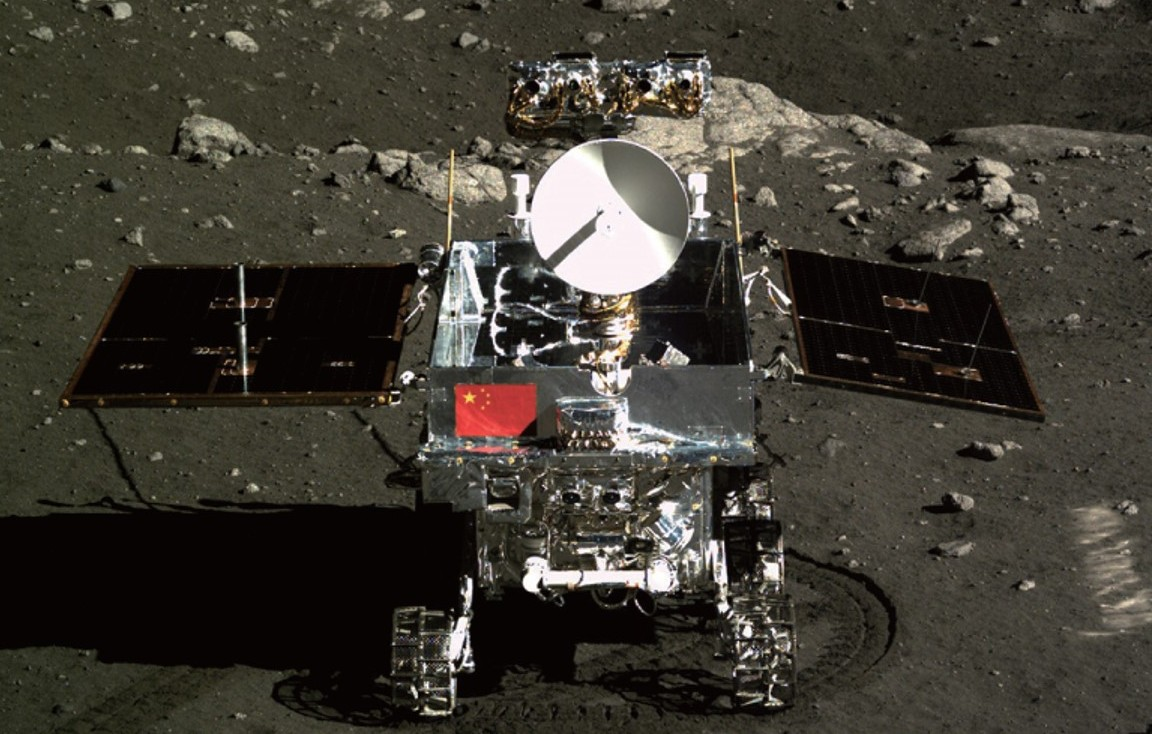
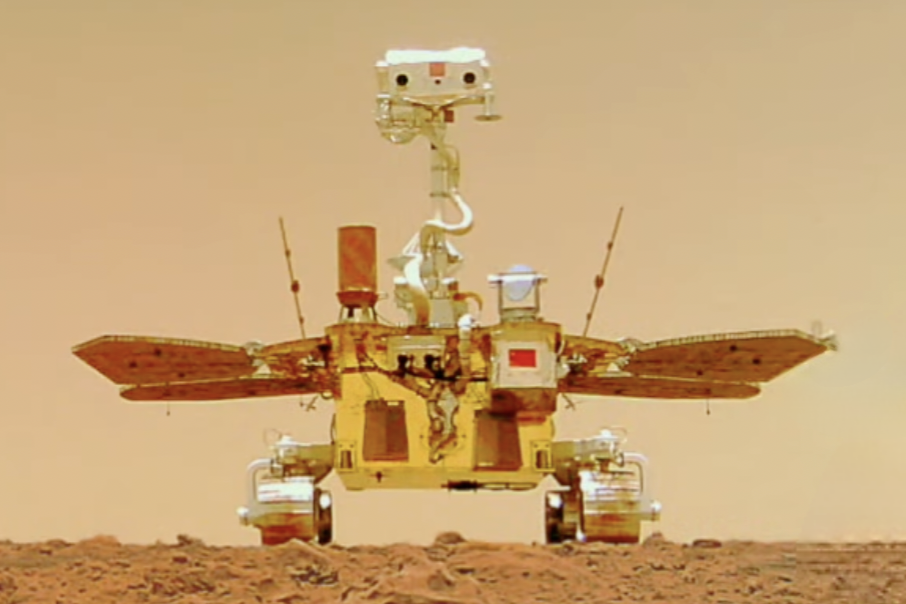
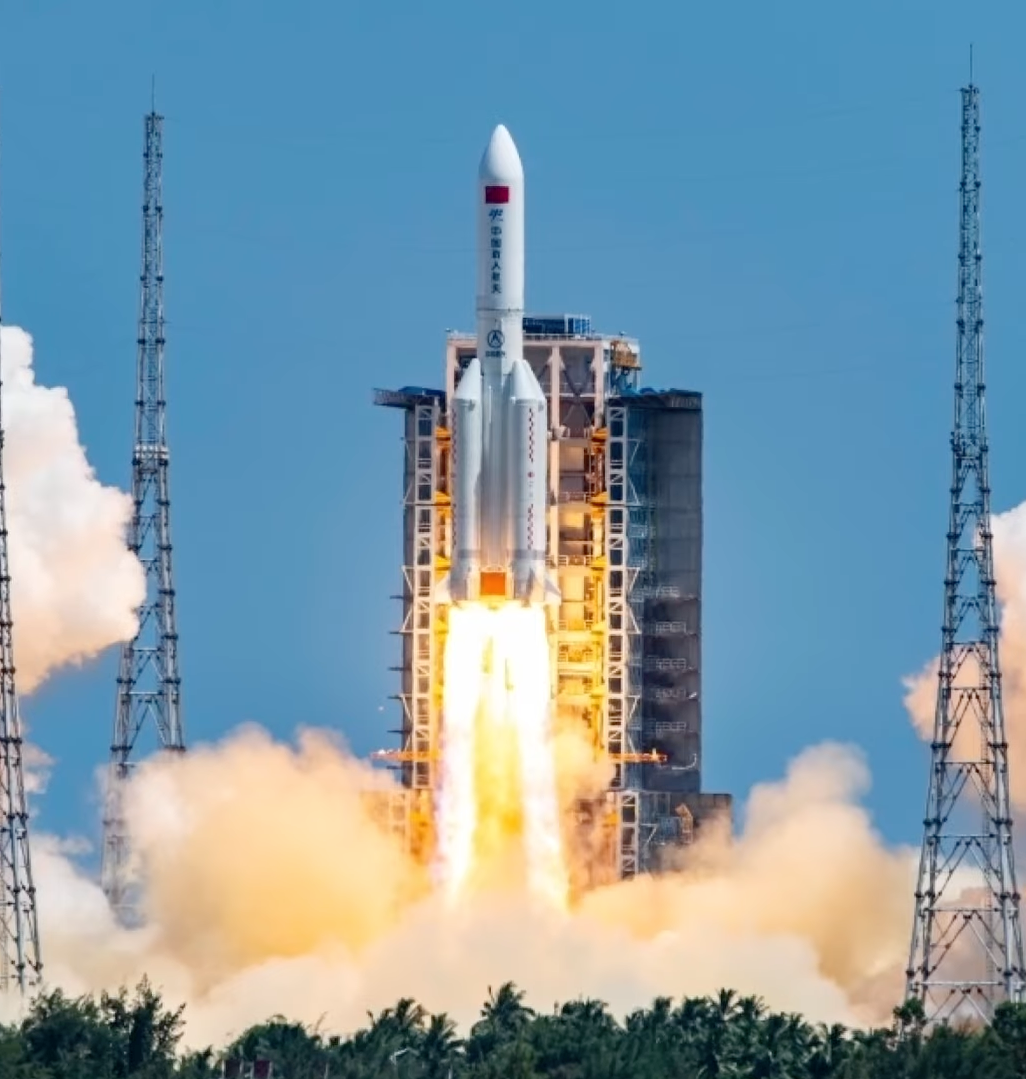
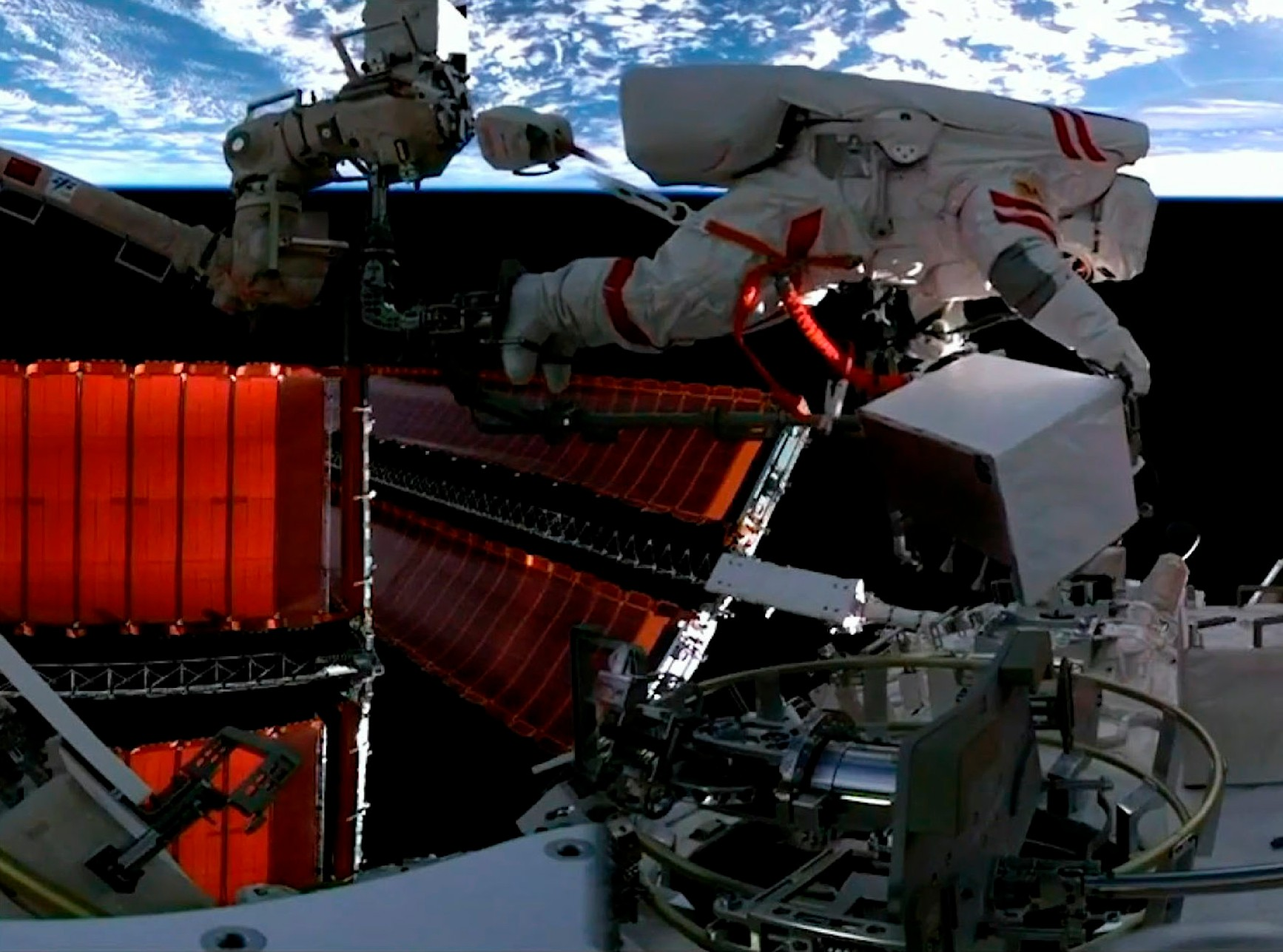
From left to right, top to bottom: Long March 1 prior to Dong Fang Hong 1 launch, 1970; Yang Liwei aboard Shenzhou 5, 2005; Yutu lunar rover, 2013; Zhurong rover on Mars, 2020; Long March 5B launching from the newest Wenchang Space Launch Site, Fei Junlong conducting a spacewalk from the Tiangong space station

The Chinese space program today conducts the most or second most orbital launches each year; China is one of three countries with a human spaceflight capability. (Note: Alongside the United States and Russia) Since the 2020s, the program has been contrasted against Western space programs as the "New Space Race".

From the 1950s, aided by the Soviet Union, development began on China's nuclear weapons, Dongfeng ballistic missiles, and Long March rockets, honored as the Two Bombs, One Satellite projects. Despite setbacks from the Cultural Revolution and Sino-Soviet split, China became the fifth country to independently launch a satellite, Dong Fang Hong 1 in 1970. China developed the Shenzhou crewed craft from Russia's Soyuz after a 1995 treaty; Shenzhou 5 carried the first Chinese astronaut in 2003. China commercially launched Western satellites from 1988, but failures, especially Intelsat 708, caused the US to embargo satellite export in 1998. After the US vetoed its joining the ISS, China began the Tiangong program, operating prototypes Tiangong-1 and -2 before the current Tiangong, the world's third modular space station. (Note: After ISS and the Soviet/Russian 1986–2001 Mir.)

China's Moon missions achieved the world's first far side landing (Chang'e 4), far side sample return (Chang'e 6), and longest-lived rover (Yutu-2). China's interplanetary missions deployed Tianwen-1, a Mars orbiter, lander, and the rover Zhurong; Tianwen-2 visited an asteroid in 2026 and will visit a comet in 2035. Its satellite constellations include BeiDou Navigation, Gaofen Observation, and the Guowang and Qianfan internet constellations. Long March 5 is the most powerful rocket operating outside of the US, and first Long March to not use hypergolic propellant.

Since 2019, China's private and state enterprises have made over a hundred launches with new rocket designs, such as the Kuaizhou family and Ceres-1. China is developing reusable spacecraft, including the Long March 10 rocket family and a military spaceplane. China plans a crewed lunar landing by 2030, using the planned Mengzhou craft, Lanyue lander, and Long March 10 rocket. China previously cooperated with the European Space Agency on deep space tracking and space science.

== International cooperation ==
=== Belt and Road Initiative ===
One of China's priorities in its Belt and Road Initiative is to improve satellite information pathways.

=== Bilateral space cooperation ===
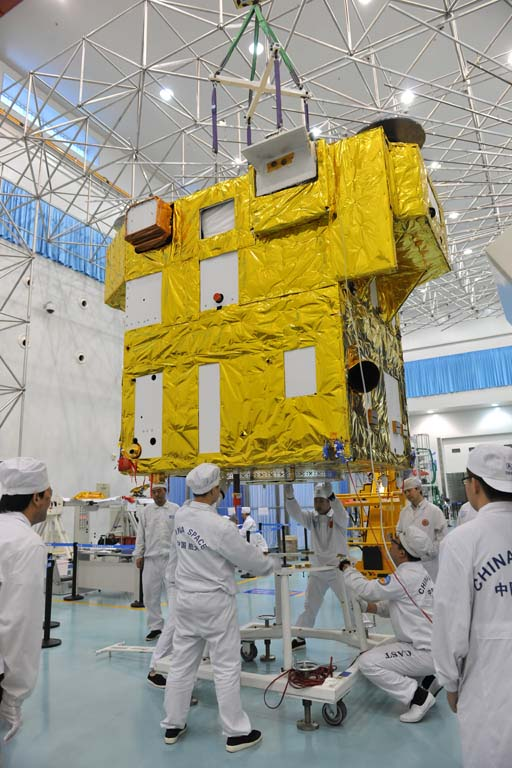
CBERS-4 satellite of the China–Brazil Earth Resources Satellite program

China is an attractive partner for space cooperation for other developing countries because it launches their satellites at a reduced cost and often provides financing in the form of policy loans.

With respect to the African countries, the 2022-2024 action plan for the Forum on China-Africa Cooperation commits China to using space technology to enhance cooperation with African countries and to create centers for Africa-China cooperation on satellite remote sensing application. African countries are increasingly cooperating with China on satellite launches and specialized training. As of 2022, China has launched two satellites for Ethiopia, two for Nigeria, one for Algeria, one for Sudan, and one for Egypt.

China and Namibia jointly operate the China Telemetry, Tracking, and Command Station which was established in 2001 in Swakopmund, Namibia. This station tracks Chinese satellites and space missions.

China and Brazil have successfully cooperated in the field of space. Among the most successful space cooperation projects were the development and launch of earth monitoring satellites. As of 2023, the two countries have jointly developed six China-Brazil Earth Resource Satellites. These projects have helped both Brazil and China develop their access to satellite imagery and promoted remote sending research. Brazil and China's cooperation is a unique example of South-South cooperation between two developing countries in the field of space.

==== With the European Space Agency ====
China has cooperated extensively with the European Space Agency. Double Star was a twin satellite mission the latter called "the first Sino-European satellite", that studied Earth's magnetosphere. ESA's ESTRACK, including the French Kourou Station and Spanish Maspalomas Station, was used to communicate with Chang'e 5 and Chang'e 6, the latter carried a French, an Italian, and a Swedish scientific instrument. ESA's Mars Express served as a backup communications satellite for the Zhurong Mars rover if the Tianwen-1 orbiter could transmit commands.

China and Russia initially hoped to attract ESA and its member nations to the International Lunar Research Station. In September 2021, Roscosmos and CNSA held private talks in Dubai with representatives of the French, German, Italian, and Dutch space efforts, as well as Malaysia, Thailand, and the United Nations Office for Outer Space Affairs. This effort was considered dead following the 2022 Russian invasion of Ukraine. In January 2023, ESA stated it had ceased pursuing sending astronauts to the Tiangong space station. Between 2020 and 2026, all ESA members became party to the US Artemis Accords, seen as a competing international lunar exploration framework. ESA is not planned to participate in Chang'e 7, which will carry a Bahrain Space Agency-Egyptian Space Agency hyperspectral imager.

=== Dual-use technologies and outer space ===
The PRC is a member of the United Nations Committee on the Peaceful Uses of Outer Space and a signatory to all United Nations treaties and conventions on space, with the exception of the 1979 Moon Treaty. The United States government has long been resistant to the use of PRC launch services by American industry due to concerns over alleged civilian technology transfer that could have dual-use military applications to countries such as North Korea, Iran or Syria. Thus, financial retaliatory measures have been taken on many occasions against several Chinese space companies.

=== NASA's policy excluding Chinese state affiliates ===
The Cox Report, released in 1999, alleged that following decades of intelligence operations against U.S. weapons laboratories conducted by the Ministry of State Security, China stole design information regarding advanced thermonuclear weapons. In 2011, Congress passed a law prohibiting NASA researchers from working with Chinese citizens affiliated with a Chinese state enterprise or entity without FBI certification or using NASA funds to host Chinese visitors. In March 2013, the U.S. Congress passed legislation barring Chinese nationals from entering NASA facilities without a waiver from NASA.

The history of the U.S. exclusion policy can be traced back to the Cox Report's allegations that the technical information that American companies provided China for its commercial satellite ended up improving Chinese intercontinental ballistic missile technology. This was further aggravated in 2007 when China blew up a defunct meteorological satellite in low Earth orbit to test a ground-based anti-satellite (ASAT) missile. The debris created by the explosion contributed to the space junk that litter Earth's orbit, exposing other nations' space assets to the risk of accidental collision. The United States also fears the Chinese application of dual-use space technology for nefarious purposes.

The Chinese response to the exclusion policy involved its own space policy of opening up its space station to the outside world, welcoming scientists coming from all countries. American scientists have also boycotted NASA conferences due to its rejection of Chinese nationals in these events. In September 2025, NASA prohibited Chinese nationals from working with its programs.

== Organization ==
Initially, the space program of the PRC was organized under the People's Liberation Army, particularly the Second Artillery Corps (now the PLA Rocket Force, PLARF). In the 1990s, the PRC reorganized the space program as part of a general reorganization of the defense industry to make it resemble Western defense procurement.

The China National Space Administration, an agency within the State Administration of Science, Technology and Industry for National Defense, is now responsible for launches. The Long March rocket is produced by the China Academy of Launch Vehicle Technology, and satellites are produced by the China Aerospace Science and Technology Corporation. The latter organizations are state-owned enterprises; however, it is the intent of the PRC government that they should not be actively state-managed and that they should behave as independent design bureaus.

Locations of Chinese space program facilities

=== Universities and institutes ===
The space program also has close links with:

- College of Aerospace Science and Engineering, National University of Defense Technology
- School of Astronautics, Beihang University
- School of Aerospace, Tsinghua University
- School of Astronautics, Northwestern Polytechnical University
- School of Aeronautics and Astronautics, Zhejiang University
- Institute of Aerospace Science and Technology, Shanghai Jiaotong University
- College of Aeronautics, Harbin Institute of Technology
- School of Automation Science and Electrical Engineering, Beihang University

=== Space cities ===
- Dongfeng Space City (东风航天城), also known as Base 20 (二十基地) or Dongfeng base (东风基地)
- Beijing Space City (北京航天城)
- Wenchang Space City (文昌航天城)
- Shanghai Space City (上海航天城)
- Yantai Space City (烟台航天城)
- Guizhou Aerospace Industrial Park (贵州航天高新技术产业园), also known as Base 061 (航天〇六一基地), founded in 2002 after approval of Project 863 for industrialization of aerospace research centers (国家863计划成果产业化基地).

=== Suborbital launch sites ===
- Nanhui (南汇县老港镇东进村) First successful launch of a T-7M sounding rocket on February 19, 1960.
- Base 603 (安徽广德誓节渡中国科学院六〇三基地) Also known as Guangde Launch Site (广德发射场). The first successful flight of a biological experimental sounding rocket transporting eight white mice was launched and recovered on July 19, 1964.

=== Satellite launch centers ===
The PRC has 6 satellite launch centers/sites:

- Jiuquan Satellite Launch Center (JSLC)
- Taiyuan Satellite Launch Center (TSLC)
- Xichang Satellite Launch Center (XSLC)
- Wenchang Spacecraft Launch Site (administered by Xichang SLC)
- Wenchang Commercial Space Launch Site (administered by HICAL)
- Haiyang Oriental Aerospace Port (administered by Taiyuan SLC)

=== Monitoring and control centers ===
- Beijing Aerospace Command and Control Center (BACCC)
- Xi'an Satellite Control Center (XSCC) also known as Base 26 (二十六基地)
- Fleet of six Yuanwang-class space tracking ships.
- Data relay satellite (数据中继卫星) Tianlian I (天链一号), specially developed to decrease the communication time between the Shenzhou 7 spaceship and the ground; it will also improve the amount of data that can be transferred. The current orbit coverage of 12 percent will thus be increased to a total of about 60 percent.
- Deep Space Tracking Network composed with radio antennas in Beijing, Shanghai, Kunming and Ürümqi, forming a 3000 km VLBI (甚长基线干涉).

==== Domestic tracking stations ====
- New integrated land-based space monitoring and control network stations, forming a large triangle with Kashi in the north-west of China, Jiamusi in the north-east and Sanya in the south.
- Weinan Station
- Changchun Station
- Qingdao Station
- Zhanyi Station
- Nanhai Station
- Tianshan Station
- Xiamen Station
- Lushan Station
- Jiamusi Station
- Dongfeng Station
- Hetian Station

==== Overseas tracking stations ====
- Tarawa Station, Kiribati
- Malindi Station, Kenya
- Swakopmund tracking station, Namibia
- China Satellite Launch and Tracking Control General tracking hub at Espacio Lejano Station in Neuquén Province, Argentina. 38.193014°S 70.147581°W

Plus shared space tracking facilities with France, Brazil, Sweden, and Australia.

=== Crewed landing sites ===
- Siziwang Banner

== Notable spaceflight programs ==
=== Project 714 ===
As the Space Race between the two superpowers reached its climax with humans landing on the Moon, Mao Zedong and Zhou Enlai decided on July 14, 1967, that the PRC should not be left behind, and therefore initiated China's own crewed space program. The top-secret Project 714 aimed to put two people into space by 1973 with the Shuguang spacecraft. Nineteen PLAAF pilots were selected for this goal in March 1971. The Shuguang-1 spacecraft to be launched with the CZ-2A rocket was designed to carry a crew of two. The program was officially cancelled on May 13, 1972, for economic reasons, though the internal politics of the Cultural Revolution likely motivated the closure.

The short-lived second crewed program was based on the successful implementation of landing technology (third in the World after USSR and United States) by FSW satellites. It was announced a few times in 1978 with the open publishing of some details including photos, but then was abruptly canceled in 1980. It has been argued that the second crewed program was created solely for propaganda purposes, and was never intended to produce results.

=== Project 863 ===
A new crewed space program was proposed by the Chinese Academy of Sciences in March 1986, as Astronautics plan 863-2. This consisted of a crewed spacecraft (Project 863–204) used to ferry astronaut crews to a space station (Project 863–205). In September of that year, astronauts in training were presented by the Chinese media. The various proposed crewed spacecraft were mostly spaceplanes. Project 863 ultimately evolved into the 1992 Project 921.

=== China Manned Space Program (Project 921) ===
==== Spacecraft ====
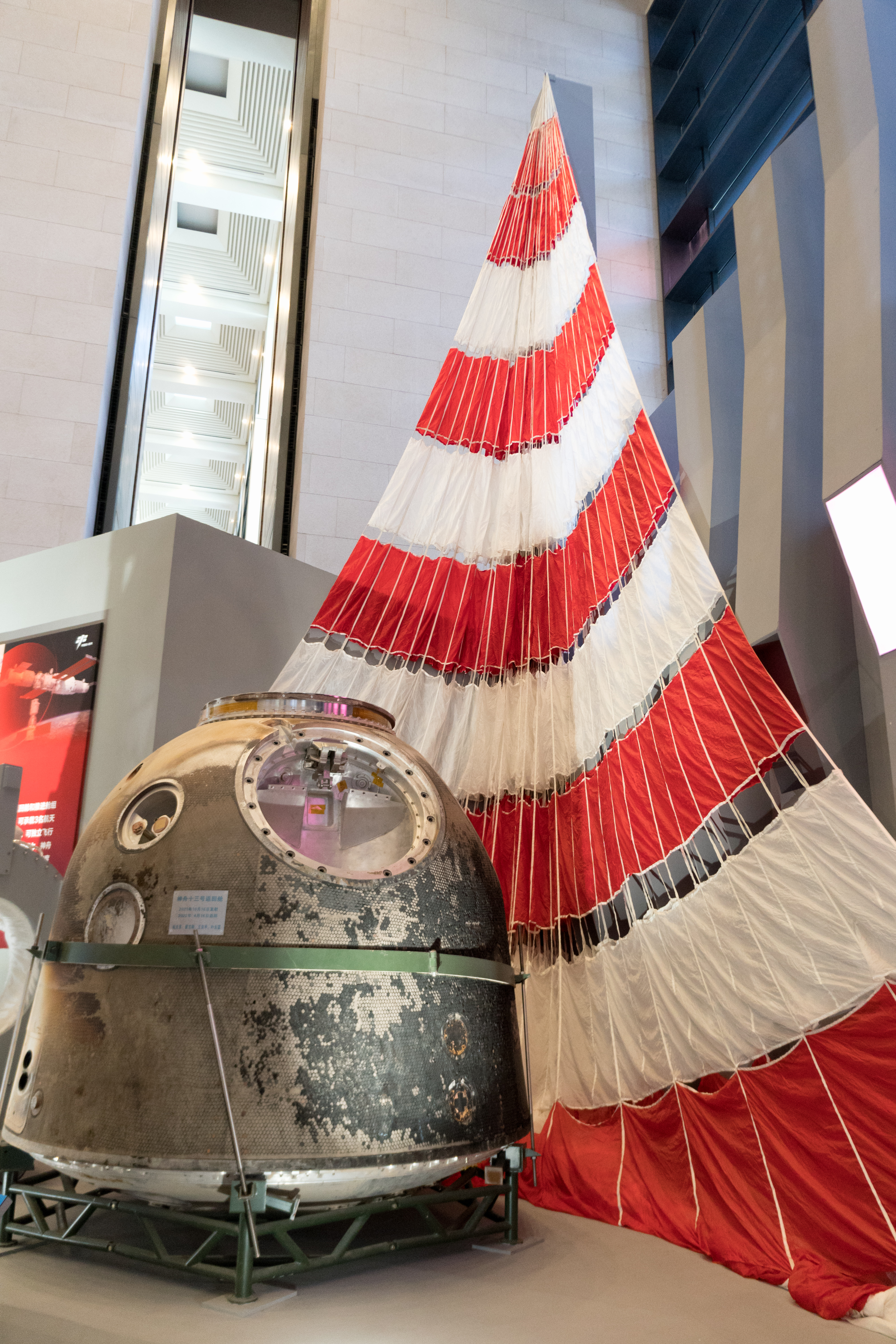
Return capsule and parachute of Shenzhou spacecraft

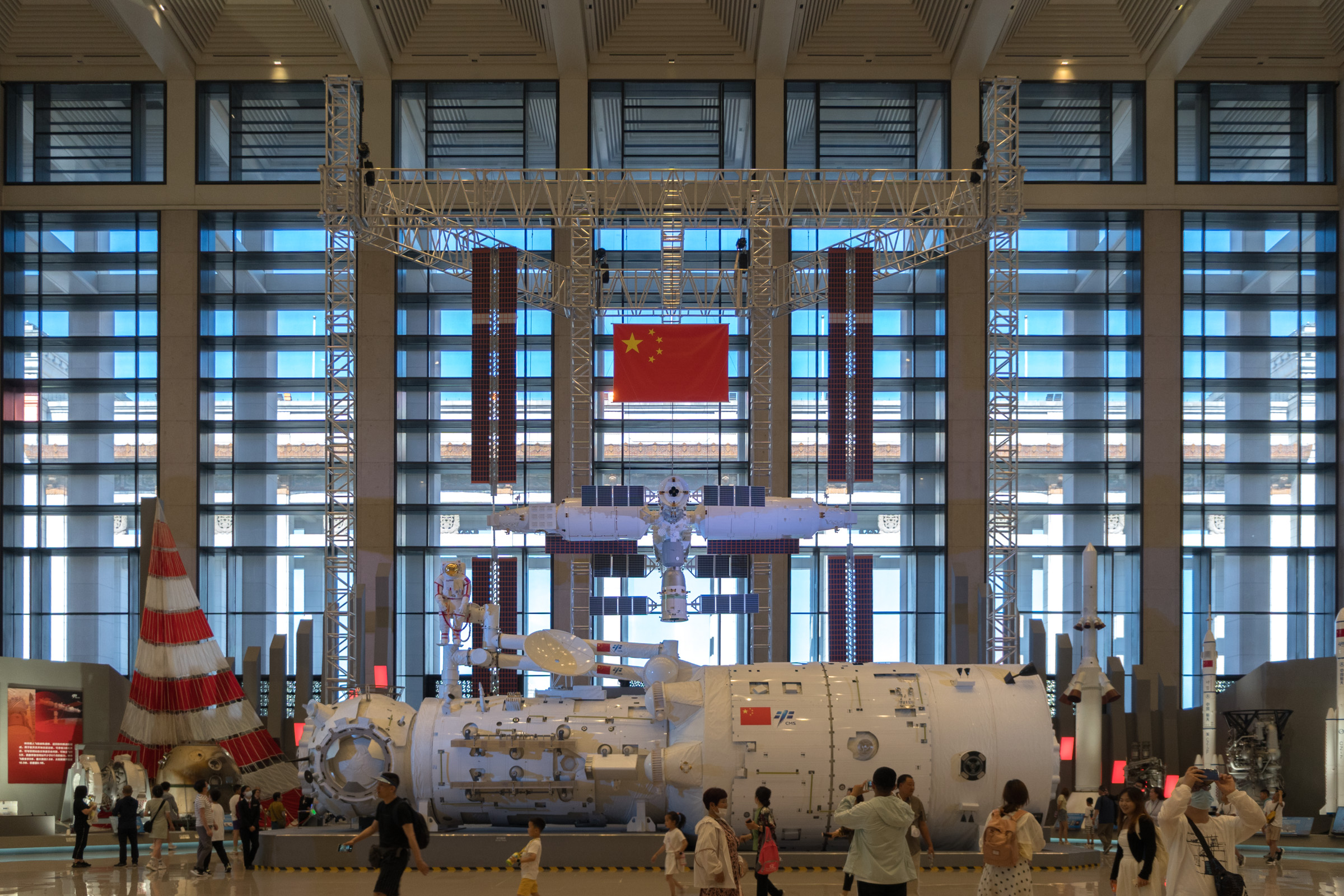
Exhibition of China Manned Space Program at the National Museum of China in 2023

In 1992, authorization and funding were given for the first phase of Project 921, which was a plan to launch a crewed spacecraft. The Shenzhou program had four uncrewed test flights and two crewed missions. The first one was Shenzhou 1 on November 20, 1999. On January 9, 2001 Shenzhou 2 launched carrying test animals. Shenzhou 3 and Shenzhou 4 were launched in 2002, carrying test dummies. Following these was the successful Shenzhou 5, China's first crewed mission in space on October 15, 2003, which carried Yang Liwei in orbit for 21 hours and made China the third nation to launch a human into orbit. Shenzhou 6 followed two years later ending the first phase of Project 921. Missions are launched on the Long March 2F rocket from the Jiuquan Satellite Launch Center. The China Manned Space Agency (CMSA) of the Equipment Development Department of the Central Military Commission provides engineering and administrative support for the crewed Shenzhou missions.

==== Space laboratory ====
The second phase of the Project 921 started with Shenzhou 7, China's first spacewalk mission. Then, two crewed missions were planned to the first Chinese space laboratory. The PRC initially designed the Shenzhou spacecraft with docking technologies imported from Russia, therefore compatible with the International Space Station (ISS). On September 29, 2011, China launched Tiangong 1. This target module is intended to be the first step to testing the technology required for a planned space station.

On October 31, 2011, a Long March 2F rocket lifted the Shenzhou 8 uncrewed spacecraft which docked twice with the Tiangong 1 module. The Shenzhou 9 craft took off on 16 June 2012 with a crew of 3. It successfully docked with the Tiangong-1 laboratory on 18 June 2012, at 06:07 UTC, marking China's first crewed spacecraft docking. Another crewed mission, Shenzhou 10, launched on 11 June 2013. The Tiangong 1 target module is then expected to be deorbited.

A second space lab, Tiangong 2, launched on 15 September 2016, 22:04:09 (UTC+8). The launch mass was 8,600 kg, with a length of 10.4m and a width of 3.35m, much like the Tiangong 1. Shenzhou 11 launched and rendezvoused with Tiangong 2 in October 2016, with an unconfirmed further mission Shenzhou 12 in the future. The Tiangong 2 brings with it the POLAR gamma ray burst detector, a space-Earth quantum key distribution, and laser communications experiment to be used in conjunction with the Mozi 'Quantum Science Satellite', a liquid bridge thermocapillary convection experiment, and a space material experiment. Also included is a stereoscopic microwave altimeter, a space plant growth experiment, and a multi-angle wide-spectral imager and multi-spectral limb imaging spectrometer. Onboard TG-2 there will also be the world's first-ever in-space cold atomic fountain clock.

==== Space station ====
A larger basic permanent space station (基本型空间站) would be the third and last phase of Project 921. This will be a modular design with an eventual weight of around 60 tons, to be completed sometime before 2022. The first section, designated Tiangong 3, was scheduled for launch after Tiangong 2, but ultimately not ordered after its goals were merged with Tiangong 2.

This could also be the beginning of China's crewed international cooperation, the existence of which was officially disclosed for the first time after the launch of Shenzhou 7.

The first module of Tiangong space station, Tianhe core module, was launched on 29 April 2021, from Wenchang Space Launch Site. It was first visited by Shenzhou 12 crew on 17 June 2021. The Chinese space station is scheduled to be completed in 2022 and fully operational by 2023.

=== Lunar exploration ===
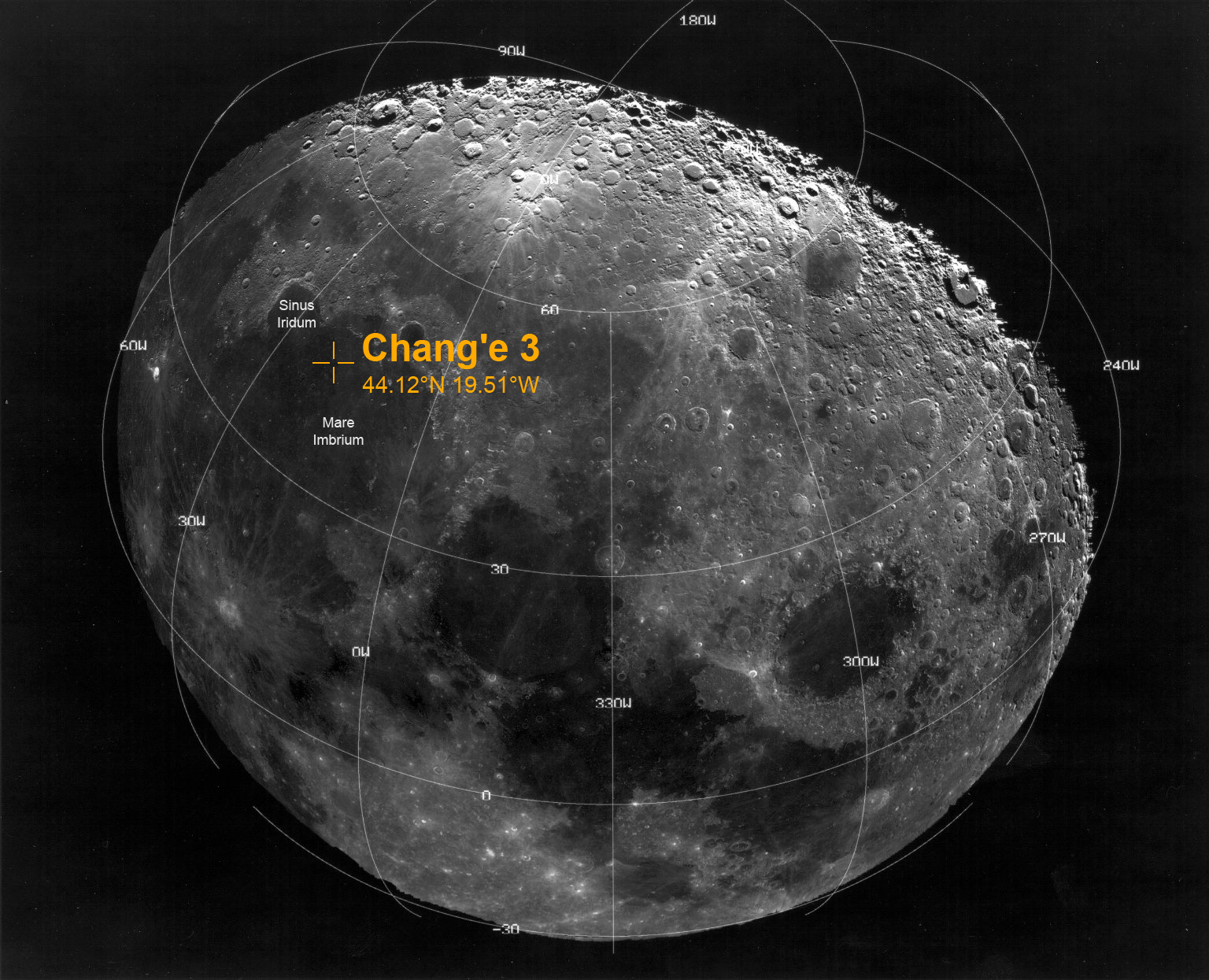
Annotated image of the approximate landing site of the Chinese Chang'e-3 lander. It was launched at 17:30 UTC on 1 December 2013 and reached the Moon's surface on 14 December 2013. The lunar coordinates are: 44.12°N 19.51°W.

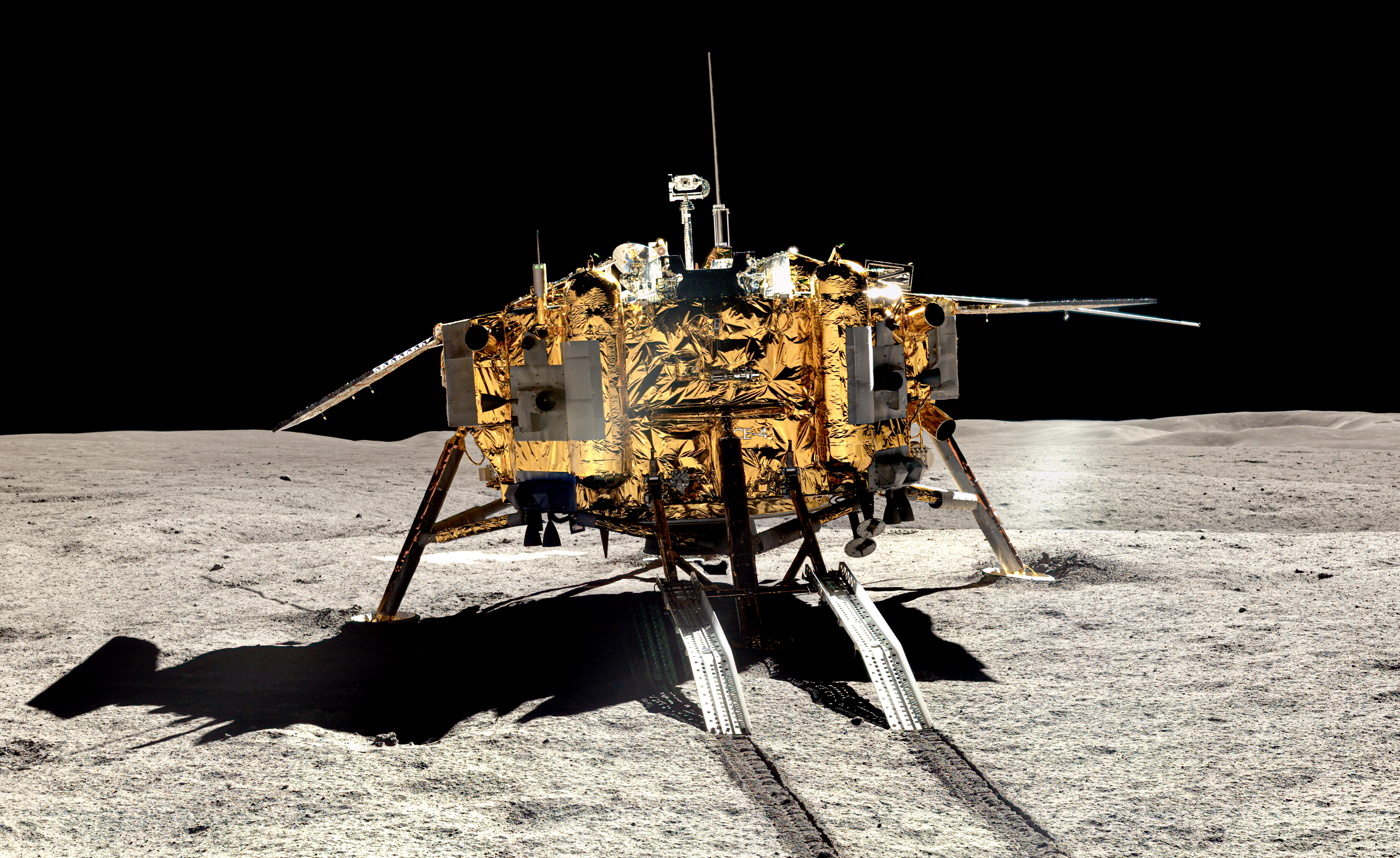
Chang'e 4 lander on the far side of the Moon

In January 2004, the PRC formally started the implementation phase of its uncrewed Moon exploration project. According to Sun Laiyan, administrator of the China National Space Administration, the project will involve three phases: orbiting the Moon; landing; and returning samples.

On December 14, 2005, it was reported "an effort to launch lunar orbiting satellites will be supplanted in 2007 by a program aimed at accomplishing an uncrewed lunar landing. A program to return uncrewed space vehicles from the Moon will begin in 2012 and last for five years, until the crewed program gets underway" in 2017, with a crewed Moon landing planned after that.

The decision to develop a new Moon rocket in the 1962 Soviet UR-700M-class (Project Aelita) able to launch a 500-ton payload in LTO and a more modest 50 tons LTO payload LV has been discussed in a 2006 conference by academician Zhang Guitian (张贵田), a liquid propellant rocket engine specialist, who developed the CZ-2 and CZ-4A rockets engines.

On June 22, 2006, Long Lehao, deputy chief architect of the lunar probe project, laid out a schedule for China's lunar exploration. He set 2024 as the date of China's first moonwalk.

In September 2010, it was announced that the country is planning to carry out explorations in deep space by sending a man to the Moon by 2025. China also hoped to bring a Moon rock sample back to Earth in 2017, and subsequently build an observatory on the Moon's surface. Ye Peijian, Commander in Chief of the Chang'e program and an academic at the Chinese Academy of Sciences, added that China has the "full capacity to accomplish Mars exploration by 2013."

On December 14, 2013 China's Chang'e 3 became the first object to soft-land on the Moon since Luna 24 in 1976.

On 20 May 2018, several months before the Chang'e 4 mission, the Queqiao was launched from Xichang Satellite Launch Center in China, on a Long March 4C rocket. The spacecraft took 24 days to reach L_{2}, using a gravity assist at the Moon to save propellant. On 14 June 2018, Queqiao finished its final adjustment burn and entered the mission orbit, about 65,000 kilometres (40,000 mi) from the Moon. This is the first lunar relay satellite ever placed in this location.

On January 3, 2019, Chang'e 4, the China National Space Administration's lunar rover, made the first-ever soft landing on the Moon's far side. The rover was able to transmit data back to Earth despite the lack of radio frequencies on the far side, via a dedicated satellite sent earlier to orbit the Moon. Landing and data transmission are considered landmark achievements for human space exploration.

Yang Liwei declared at the 16th Human in Space Symposium of International Academy of Astronautics (IAA) in Beijing, on May 22, 2007, that building a lunar base was a crucial step to realize a flight to Mars and farther planets.

According to practice, since the whole project is only at a very early preparatory research phase, no official crewed Moon program has been announced yet by the authorities. But its existence is nonetheless revealed by regular intentional leaks in the media. A typical example is the Lunar Roving Vehicle (月球车) that was shown on a Chinese TV channel (东方卫视) during the 2008 May Day celebrations.

On 23 November 2020, China launched the new Moon mission Chang'e 5, which returned to Earth carrying lunar samples on 16 December 2020. Only two nations, the United States and the former Soviet Union have ever returned materials from the Moon, thus making China the third country to have ever achieved the feat.

China sent Chang'e 6 on 3 May, which conducted the first lunar sample return from the far side of the Moon. This is China's second lunar sample return mission, the first was achieved by Chang'e 5 from the lunar near side 4 years ago.

=== Mission to Mars and beyond ===
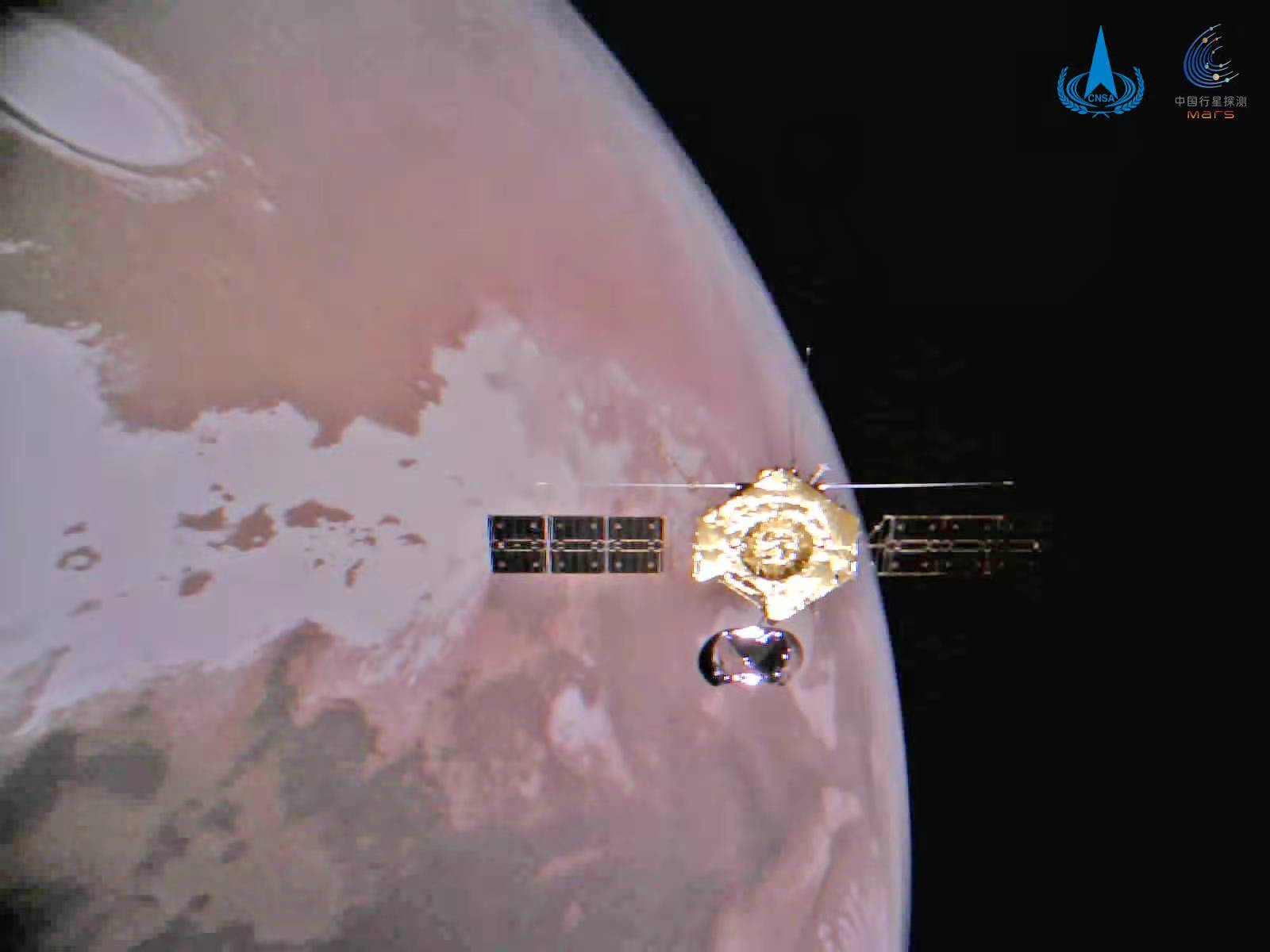
Tianwen-1 probe in Mars orbit.

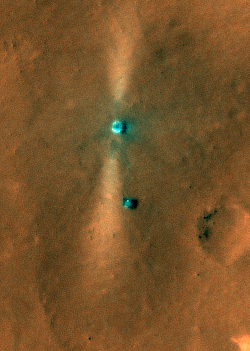
Zhurong rover and lander on Martian surface. Image captured by HiRISE from NASA's Mars Reconnaissance Orbiter on 6 June 2021

In 2006, the Chief Designer of the Shenzhou spacecraft stated in an interview that:

搞航天工程不是要达成升空之旅, 而是要让人可以正常在太空中工作, 为将来探索火星、土星等作好准备。 Space programs are not aimed at sending humans into space per se, but instead at enabling humans to work normally in space, and prepare for the future exploration of Mars, Saturn, and beyond.

— CAS Academician Qi Faren

Sun Laiyan, administrator of the China National Space Administration, said on July 20, 2006, that China would start deep space exploration focusing on Mars over the next five years, during the Eleventh Five-Year Plan (2006–2010) Program period. In April 2020, the Planetary Exploration of China program was announced. The program aims to explore planets of the Solar System, starting with Mars, then expanded to include asteroids and comets, Jupiter and more in the future.

The first mission of the program, Tianwen-1 Mars exploration mission, began on July 23, 2020. A spacecraft, which consisted of an orbiter, a lander, a rover, a remote and a deployable camera, was launched by a Long March 5 rocket from Wenchang. The Tianwen-1 was inserted into Mars orbit in February 2021 after a seven-month journey, followed by a successful soft landing of the lander and Zhurong rover on May 14, 2021.

=== Space-based solar power ===
According to the China Academy of Space Technology (CAST) presentation at the 2015 International Space Development Congress in Toronto, Canada, Chinese interest in space-based solar power began in the period 1990–1995. By 2013, there was a national goal, that "the state has decided that power coming from outside of the earth, such as solar power and development of other space energy resources, is to be China's future direction" and the following roadmap was identified: "In 2010, CAST will finish the concept design; in 2020, we will finish the industrial level testing of in-orbit construction and wireless transmissions. In 2025, we will complete the first 100kW SPS demonstration at LEO; and in 2035, the 100MW SPS will have an electric generating capacity. Finally in 2050, the first commercial level SPS system will be in operation at GEO." The article went on to state that "Since SPS development will be a huge project, it will be considered the equivalent of an Apollo program for energy. In the last century, America's leading position in science and technology worldwide was inextricably linked with technological advances associated with the implementation of the Apollo program. Likewise, as China's current achievements in aerospace technology are built upon with its successive generations of satellite projects in space, China will use its capabilities in space science to assure sustainable development of energy from space."

In 2015, the CAST team won the International SunSat Design Competition with their video of a Multi-Rotary Joint concept. The design was presented in detail in a paper for the Online Journal of Space Communication.

In 2016, Lt Gen. Zhang Yulin, deputy chief of the PLA armament development department of the Central Military Commission, suggested that China would next begin to exploit Earth-Moon space for industrial development. The goal would be the construction of space-based solar power satellites that would beam energy back to Earth.

In June 2021, Chinese officials confirmed the continuation of plans for a geostationary solar power station by 2050. The updated schedule anticipates a small-scale electricity generation test in 2022, followed by a megawatt-level orbital power station by 2030. The gigawatt-level geostationary station will require over 10,000 tonnes of infrastructure, delivered using over 100 Long March 9 launches.

== List of launchers and projects ==
=== Launch vehicles ===
==== Active or under development ====
- Air-Launched SLV able to place a 50 kilogram plus payload to 500 km SSO
- Ceres-1 small-lift solid-fueled launch vehicle from private firm (relatively high launch cadence)
- Ceres-2 small-lift solid-fueled launch vehicle from private firm (the only launch failed)
- Gravity-1 medium-lift sea-launched solid fuel launch vehicle
- Gravity-2 partially reusable heavy-lift launch vehicle from private firm currently under development
- Hyperbola-1 small-lift solid-fueled launch vehicle from private firm
- Hyperbola-3 medium-lift liquid-fueled (methalox) launch vehicle with reusable first stage (VTVL) from private firm currently under development
- Jielong 3 small to medium-lift solid fueled launch vehicle currently in service
- Kaituozhe-1A (开拓者一号甲)
- Kuaizhou quick-reaction small-lift solid fuel launch vehicle
- Lijian-1 small to medium-lift solid fuel launch vehicle currently in service (by the commercial spin-off of the Chinese Academy of Sciences)
- Lijian-2 medium-lift launch vehicle utilizing liquid fuel (kerolox) with reusable first stage (in service)
- CZ-2F/G Modified CZ-2F without escape tower, specially used for launching robotic missions such as Shenzhou cargo and space laboratory module with payload capacity up to 11.2 tons in LEO
- CZ-3B(A) More powerful Long March rockets using larger-size liquid propellant strap-on motors, with payload capacity up to 13 tons in LEO
- CZ-3C Launch vehicle combining CZ-3B core with two boosters from CZ-2E
- CZ-4C
- CZ-5 heavy-lift hydrolox launch vehicle (with kerolox boosters)
- CZ-5B variant of the CZ-5 for low Earth orbit payloads (up to 25 tonnes to LEO)
- CZ-6 or Small Launch Vehicle; small-lift kerolox LV with short launch preparation period, low cost and high reliability, to meet the launch need of small satellites up to 500 kg to 700 km SSO, first flight for 2010; with Fan Ruixiang (范瑞祥) as Chief designer of the project
- CZ-7 medium-lift kerolox launch vehicle for launching resupply missions to the Tiangong space station
- CZ-8 medium-lift launch vehicle mainly for launching payloads to SSO orbits
- CZ-9 super heavy-lift launch vehicle with a LEO lift capability of 150 tonnes currently under development (planned to be fully reusable in time)
- CZ-10 crew-rated super-heavy launch vehicle for crewed lunar missions under development
- CZ-10A crew-rated medium-lift launch vehicle for launching the next-generation crewed spacecraft to LEOs with reusable first stage currently under development
- CZ-11 small-lift solid fuel quick-response launch vehicle
- CZ-12 medium-lift kerolox launch vehicle
- CZ-12A partially reusable (1st stage) medium-lift methalox launch vehicle (in service)
- CZ-12B partially reusable (1st stage) medium-lift to heavy-lift kerolox launch vehicle (in service)
- Pallas-1 reusable (1st stage) medium-lift liquid fuel (kerolox) launch vehicle by private firm currently under development
- Project 921-3 Reusable launch vehicle current project of the reusable shuttle system.
- Tengyun another current project of two wing-staged reusable shuttle system
- Reusable spaceplane reusable vertically launched spaceplane with wings that lands on a runway and currently in service (speculated to be similar to the US X-37B in form and function)
- Tianlong-2 medium-lift kerolox launch vehicle from private firm (in service)
- Tianlong-3 medium to heavy-lift kerolox launch vehicle with reusable first stage from private firm (the only launch failed)
- Zhuque-2 medium-lift liquid fuel (methalox) launch vehicle by private firm currently in service (first methane fueled rocket in the world to reach space and to reach orbit with payload)
- Zhuque-3 medium to heavy-lift methalox launch vehicle by private firm with reusable first stage (in service)

==== Cancelled/retired ====
- CZ-1D based on a CZ-1 but with a new N_{2}O_{4}/UDMH second stage.
- Project 869 reusable shuttle system with Tianjiao-1 or Chang Cheng-1 (Great Wall-1) orbiters. Project of 1980s-1990s.

=== Satellites and science missions ===
- Space-Based ASAT System small and nano-satellites developed by the Small Satellite Research Institute of the Chinese Academy of Space Technology.
- The Double Star Mission comprised two satellites launched in 2003 and 2004, jointly with ESA, to study the Earth's magnetosphere.
- Earth observation, remote sensing or reconnaissance satellites series: CBERS, Dongfanghong program, Fanhui Shi Weixing, Yaogan and Ziyuan 3.
- Tianlian I telecommunication satellite
- Tianlian II (天链二号) Next generation data relay satellite (DRS) system, based on the DFH-4 satellite bus, with two satellites providing up to 85% coverage.
- Beidou navigation system or Compass Navigation Satellite System, composed of 60 to 70 satellites, during the "Eleventh Five-Year Plan" period (2006–2010).
- Astrophysics research, with the launch of the world's largest Solar Space Telescope in 2008, and Project 973 Space Hard X-Ray Modulation Telescope (硬X射线调制望远镜) by 2010.
- Chinese Deep Space Network with the completion of the FAST, the world's largest single dish radio antenna of 500 m in Guizhou, and a 3000 km VLBI radio antenna.
- A Deep Impact-style mission to test process of re-directing the direction of an asteroid or comet.

=== Space exploration ===
==== Crewed LEO Program ====
- Project 921-1 – Shenzhou spacecraft.
- Tiangong - first three crewed Chinese Space Laboratories.
- Project 921-2 – permanent crewed modular Chinese Space Station
- Tianzhou – robotic cargo vessel to resupply the Chinese Space Station, based on the design of Tiangong-1, not meant for reentry, but usable for garbage disposal.
- Next-generation crewed spacecraft (货运飞船) – upgrade version of the Shenzhou spacecraft to resupply the Chinese Space Station and return cargo back to Earth.
- Project 921-11 – X-11 reusable spacecraft for Project 921-2 Space Station.
- Tianjiao-1 or Chang Cheng-1 (Great Wall-1) - winged spaceplane orbiters of Project 869 reusable shuttle system. Project of 1980s-1990s.
- Shenlong - winged spaceplane orbiter of current Project 921-3 reusable shuttle system.
- Tengyun - winged spaceplane orbiter in another current project of two wing-staged reusable shuttle system.
- HTS Maglev Launch Assist Space Shuttle - winged spaceplane orbiter in another current shuttle project.

==== Chinese Lunar Exploration Program ====
- First phase, Chang'e 1 and Chang'e 2 – launched in 2007 and 2010
- Second phase, Chang'e 3 and Chang'e 4 – launched in 2013 and 2018
- Third phase, Chang'e 5-T1 (completed in 2014) and Chang'e 5 – (completed in 2020)
- Fourth phase, Chang'e 6 (sample-return from lunar far-side in May–June 2024), Chang'e 7 and Chang'e 8 – will explore the south pole for natural resources; may 3D-print a structure using regolith.
- Crewed mission: by the year 2030, – crewed lunar missions employing the Mengzhou orbiter, Lanyue lander, and Long March 10 rocket.

==== Deep space exploration program ====
China's first deep space probe, the Yinghuo-1 orbiter, was launched in November 2011 along with the joint Fobos-Grunt mission with Russia, but the rocket failed to leave Earth orbit and both probes underwent destructive re-entry on 15 January 2012.

In 2018, Chinese researchers proposed a deep space exploration roadmap to explore Mars, an asteroid, Jupiter, and further targets, within the 2020–2030 timeframe. Current and upcoming robotic missions include:

- Chinese Deep Space Network relay satellites, for deep-space communication and exploration support network.
- Tianwen-1, launched on 23 July 2020 with arrival at Mars on 10 February 2021. Mission includes an orbiter, a deployable and remote camera, a lander, and the Zhurong rover.
- Tianwen-2, formerly ZhengHe, launched on 29 May 2025. Mission goals include asteroid flyby observations, global remote sensing, robotic landing, and sample return.
- Shensuo, formerly Interstellar Express, targeting for launch around 2024–2025 for Interstellar Heliosphere Probe-1 (IHP-1) and around 2025–2026 for Interstellar Heliosphere Probe-2 (IHP-2). Mission objectives include exploration of the heliosphere and interstellar space. Also to become the first non-NASA probes to leave the Solar System.
- Tianwen-3, Mars sample return mission planned for launch around 2028–2030. Mission goals include in-situ topography and soil composition analysis, deep interior investigations to probe the planet's origins and geologic evolution, and sample return. As of December 2019, the plan is for two launches to be conducted during the November 2028 Earth-to-Mars launch window: a sample collection lander with Mars ascent vehicle on a Long March 3B, and an Earth Return Orbiter on a Long March 5, with samples returning to Earth in September 2031. Earlier plans implemented the mission in a single launch using the Long March 9.
- Tianwen-4, 2029–2030, orbital exploration of Jupiter and its four largest moons (with a focus on Callisto by orbiting this Jovian moon), study of the magnetohydrodynamics in the Jupiter system, and investigation of the internal composition of Jupiter's atmosphere and moons, A Uranus fly-by probe will detach from the Jupiter orbiter while in interplanetary space for encounter during the 2040s.

== See also ==
- Beihang University – Public university in Beijing, China
- Nuclear weapons of China
- Two Bombs, One Satellite – Nuclear and aerospace projects of the People's Republic of China
- Chinese women in space – History of female astronauts in China
- Harbin Institute of Technology – Public university in Harbin, Heilongjiang, China
- French space program
- List of human spaceflights to the Tiangong space station
