= Base 26 =

Base 26 may refer to:

- A numeral system, see List of numeral systems § By type of notation
- Xi'an Satellite Control Center, a Chinese aerospace facility
