= Li Jisheng =

Chinese aerospace engineer (1943–2019)

- 李济生
- Born: May 31, 1943; Jinan, Shandong, China
- Died: July 28, 2019 (aged 76); Beijing, China
- Education: Nanjing University
- Scientific career
- Fields: Satellite orbital dynamics and satellite TT&C
- Workplaces: Xi'an Satellite Control Center

Li Jisheng (simplified Chinese: 李济生; traditional Chinese: 李濟生; pinyin: Lǐ Jìshēng; May 31, 1943 – July 28, 2019) was a Chinese aerospace engineer specializing in satellite orbital dynamics and satellite TT&C.

== Biography ==
Li was born in Jinan, Shandong, on May 31, 1943. His parents died of illness at the age of 4 and 12, respectively. It was Li's aunt who raised him and provided him for university. After graduating from Nanjing University in 1966, he was assigned to the Xi'an Satellite Control Center as a researcher. On April 24, 1970, Li participated in the test mission of the first man-made satellite "Dong Fang Hong I", in which he was mainly responsible for satellite orbit calculation. From 1984 to 1986, Li was a visiting scholar at the University of Texas in the United States. In 1985, Li was elected a member of the American Geophysical Society. From 1988 to 1989, Li went to Mécanique Aviation Traction (Matra) to cooperate in the development of satellite TT&C software. In 1995, he published the monograph Precision Orbit Determination of Artificial Satellite. In 1997, Li was elected academician of the Chinese Academy of Sciences. In 2008 he was elected a member of the 11th National Committee of the Chinese People's Political Consultative Conference. On July 28, 2019, Li Jisheng died of illness in Beijing at the age of 76.

== Awards ==
- 2000 Science and Technology Award of the Ho Leung Ho Lee Foundation
