= Qi Faren =

Chinese aerospace engineer

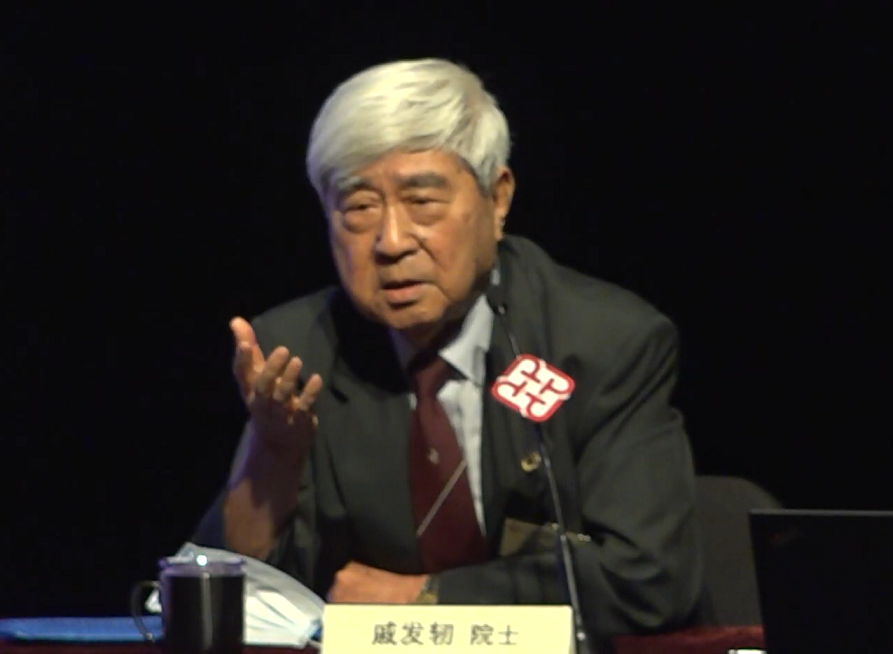
- Qi Faren in 2021, speaking at Hong Kong Polytechnic University
- Born: 1933 (age 92–93); Wafangdian, Liaoning, China
- Education: Beijing Aviation Institute
- Scientific career
- Fields: Satellite design, aerospace engineering

Qi Faren (Chinese: 戚发轫; born 1933) is a Chinese aerospace engineer and the chief designer for Chinese spacecraft since the launch of the prototype Shenzhou crewed spacecraft in 1999.

Qi was born in 1933 in Wafangdian, Liaoning, China, and graduated from the Beijing Institute of Aeronautics and Astronautics in 1957. Qi took part in the research and design of the People's Republic of China's first satellite - the Dong Fang Hong I, which was successfully launched, and stayed in orbit, in 1970. He was then appointed the general designer of China's spacecraft in 1992, following the retirement of Qian Xuesen.

Qi is an academician of the Chinese Academy of Engineering and the International Academy of Astronautics. He was inducted into the International Astronautical Federation Hall of Fame in 2019, the third Chinese inductee after Wang Xiji and Long Lehao. In 2020, he became a laureate of the Asian Scientist 100 by the Asian Scientist.
