= Swakopmund tracking station =

Chinese space tracking station in Namibia

- Part of Tracking, Telemetry, Command and Communications System, China Manned Space Engineering
- Swakopmund, Namibia

Site information
- Type: Space tracking station

Location
- Swakopmund in Namibia
- Coordinates: 22.574746°S 14.54778°E

Site history
- Built: 2001
- Built by: Windhoek Consulting Engineers

Swakopmund tracking station is a Chinese space tracking station in Swakopmund, Namibia, South-West Africa which is used for the Chinese manned space programme. The full name of the station, according to the Namibian Ministry of Education, is China Telemetry, Tracking and Command Station. The station, which opened in 2001, tracks the re-entry of Chinese manned space vehicles.

The station was built as a result of an agreement signed in October 2000 between the Namibian and Chinese governments. It was built by Windhoek Consulting Engineers at an estimated cost of $12 million Namibian dollars and opened in July 2001. The site is north of Swakopmund and is a 150m x 85m compound surrounded by a 2m high wall. There are two antennae for communicating with spacecraft, one 5m in diameter and the other 9m. The latter is 16m high.

In March 2012 it was announced that it had participated in six launches. It was involved in the 29 June 2012 descent of Shenzhou 9, the first manned craft to dock with Chinese space station Tiangong 1, and the craft with the first Chinese woman in space, Liu Yang. The ground track of the descending craft passed over the station on its way to land in Inner Mongolia.

The station is part of the Chinese Tracking, Telemetry, Command and Communications System which uses S band communications. It is one of three overseas stations - the other two are in Karachi, Pakistan and Malindi, Kenya. The programme also uses Yuanwang tracking ships and Tianlian relay satellites.
