= Tiangong-1 =

Chinese space station (2011–2018)

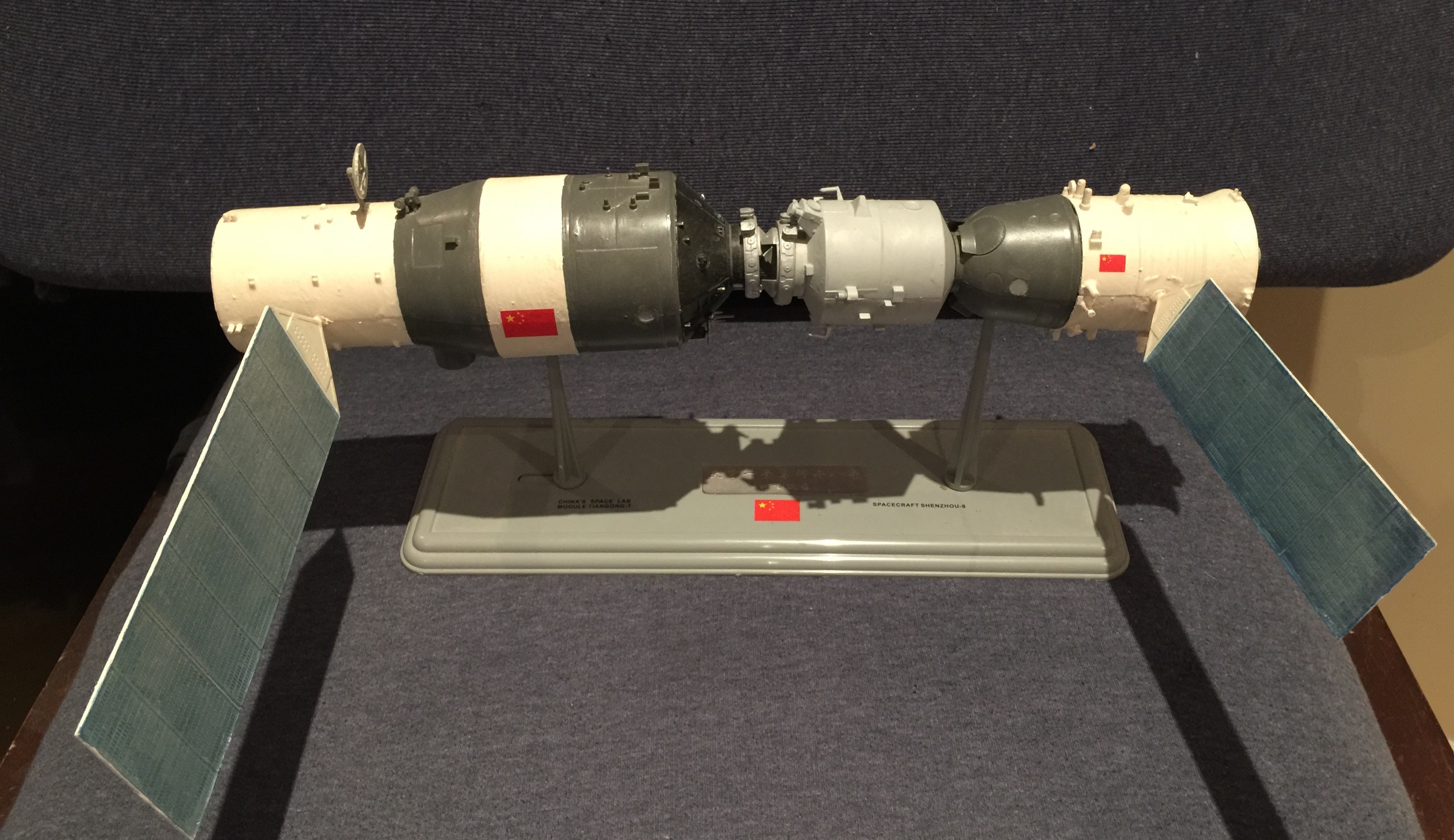
- Model of Tiangong-1 with docked Shenzhou crewed spacecraft

Station statistics
- COSPAR ID: 2011-053A
- SATCAT no.: 37820
- Launch: 29 September 2011, 13:16:03 UTC
- Carrier rocket: Long March 2F/T (T1)
- Launch pad: Jiuquan, LA-4/SLS-1
- Reentry: 2 April 2018, 00:16 UTC
- Mission status: Deorbited
- Mass: 8,506 kg (18,753 lb)
- Length: 10.4 m (34 ft)
- Diameter: 3.35 m (11 ft)
- Pressurised volume: 15 m^{3} (530 cu ft)
- Days occupied: 20 days, 18.5 hours (hatch open to close)
- Configuration
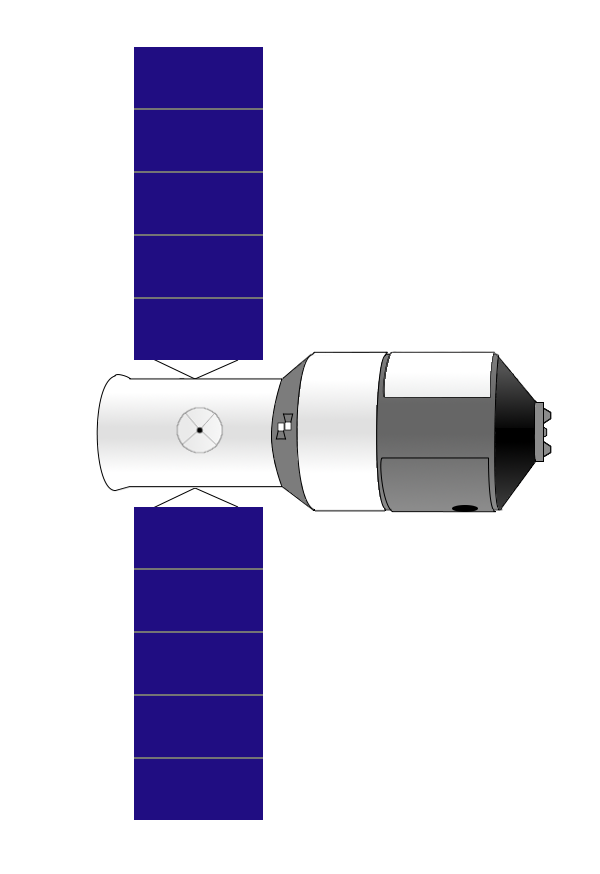
- Plan diagram of Tiangong-1 with solar panels extended

Tiangong-1
- Simplified Chinese: 天宫一号
- Traditional Chinese: 天宮一號
- Literal meaning: Heavenly Palace 1
Transcriptions
Standard Mandarin
- Hanyu Pinyin: Tiāngōng yīhào
- Gwoyeu Romatzyh: Tiangong ihaw
- Wade–Giles: T'ien^{1}kung^{1} i^{1}hao^{4}
- Yale Romanization: Tyāngūng yīhàu
Yue: Cantonese
- Yale Romanization: Tīngūng yāthouh
- Jyutping: Tin1 gung1 jat1 hou6
Southern Min
- Hokkien POJ: Thian-kong it-hō

Target Vehicle
- Simplified Chinese: 目标飞行器
- Traditional Chinese: 目標飛行器
Transcriptions
Standard Mandarin
- Hanyu Pinyin: Mùbiāo Fēixíngqì
- Gwoyeu Romatzyh: muhbiau feishyngchih
- Wade–Giles: mu^{4}piao^{1} fei^{1}hsing^{2}ch'i^{4}

Tiangong-1 (Chinese: 天宫一号; pinyin: Tiāngōng yīhào; lit. 'Heavenly Palace 1') was China's first prototype space station. It orbited Earth from September 2011 to April 2018. During development, it was known as the target vehicle, reflecting its primary role as an experimental testbed for demonstrating orbital rendezvous and docking, and secondarily as a crewed laboratory for scientific research during its two years of active service.

Tiangong-1 was launched uncrewed on 29 September 2011 aboard the first Long March 2F/T, an upgraded version of China's human-rated launch vehicle. It was the first operational component of the Tiangong program, which later led to the launch of the modular Tiangong space station in 2021. Tiangong-1 was initially expected to be deorbited in 2013 and replaced by the larger Tiangong-2 and Tiangong-3 stations over the following decade, but it remained in orbit until 2 April 2018.

Three Shenzhou spacecraft visited Tiangong-1 during its operational lifetime. The first, the uncrewed Shenzhou 8, successfully docked with the module in November 2011. The crewed Shenzhou 9 mission docked in June 2012, followed by the crewed Shenzhou 10 mission in June 2013. The crewed missions included China's first two female astronauts, Liu Yang and Wang Yaping.

On 21 March 2016, the China Manned Space Engineering Office announced that contact with the station had been lost. Unable to conduct a controlled deorbit, Tiangong-1 made an uncontrolled re-entry into Earth's atmosphere over the southern Pacific Ocean, northwest of Tahiti, on 2 April 2018 at 00:16 UTC.

== Design and development ==
The China National Space Administration (CNSA) designed Tiangong-1 as an 8,500 kg (18,700 lb) "space-laboratory module", capable of supporting the docking of crewed and autonomous spacecraft. In 2008, the China Manned Space Engineering Office (CMSEO) released a brief description of Tiangong-1, along with its larger successor modules, Tiangong-2 and Tiangong-3. A model of the space station was revealed in the Chinese Lunar New Year celebration program on CCTV on 25 January 2009.

On 29 September 2008, Zhang Jianqi (張建啟), vice-director of the CMSEO, declared in an interview with China Central Television (CCTV) that Tiangong-1 would be launched in 2010 or 2011. Xinhua News Agency later stated that Tiangong-1 would be launched in late 2010, and declared that the renovation of ground equipment was in progress. However, the launch did not ultimately take place until 2011.

By mid-2011, the construction of Tiangong-1 was complete, and its systems and thermal properties were undergoing testing. Testing was also conducted on the Long March 2F launch vehicle on which Tiangong-1 would be launched. Technicians undertook particularly extensive safety tests on the launch vehicle due to the recent launch failure of a Long March 2C launch vehicle.

=== Structure ===
Tiangong-1 had a pressurised habitable volume of approximately 15 m^{3} (530 cu ft), and used passive APAS-type docking connectors. Structurally, Tiangong-1 was divided into two primary sections: a resource module, which mounted its solar panels and propulsion systems, and a larger, habitable experimental module.

=== Onboard facilities ===
Tiangong-1's experimental module was equipped with exercise gear and two sleep stations. The interior walls of the spacecraft had a two-colour paint scheme – one colour representative of the ground, and the other representative of the sky. This was intended to help the astronauts maintain their orientation in zero gravity. High-resolution interior cameras allowed crewed missions to be closely monitored from the ground, and the two sleep stations had individual lighting controls. Toilet facilities and cooking equipment for the crewed missions were provided by the docked Shenzhou (spacecraft), rather than being integrated into the Tiangong module itself. Similarly, one member of the module's three-person crew slept in the Shenzhou spacecraft, preventing overcrowding.

== Mission profile ==
Animation of Tiangong-1's orbit from 1 February 2018 to 2 April 2018. Tiangong- 1 Earth

=== Background ===
Tiangong-1 was originally intended to be launched in August 2011, and was delivered to the Jiuquan Satellite Launch Center on 23 July 2011, successfully passing a launch rehearsal test on 17 August 2011. However, following the failed launch of a Long March 2C launch vehicle in August 2011, the launch was postponed. Following an investigation into the August 2011 launch failure, Tiangong-1's launch was rescheduled for late September 2011, partly to coincide with the Chinese National Day on 1 October 2011.

=== Launch ===
On 20 September 2011, the spacecraft was again rolled out to Pad 1 of the South Launch Site at Jiuquan Satellite Launch Center in preparation for the rescheduled launch attempt. The launch occurred at 13:16 UTC on 29 September 2011, successfully placing Tiangong-1 into low Earth orbit. Chinese television broadcast the launch animation accompanied by an instrumental version of the American patriotic song America the Beautiful, a choice of music for which it later offered no explanation.

=== Orbital transfers and testing ===
On 30 September 2011, Tiangong-1 completed the second of two orbital maneuvers, reaching an apogee altitude of 355 km (221 mi). This was the precursor to a week-long program of orbital testing, conducted from the Beijing Aerospace Command and Control Center, to prepare the module for future orbital docking operations. On 10 October 2011, Tiangong-1 released its first orbital photo, showing a view of its outer hull and satellite relay antenna.

=== Autonomous orbital docking ===
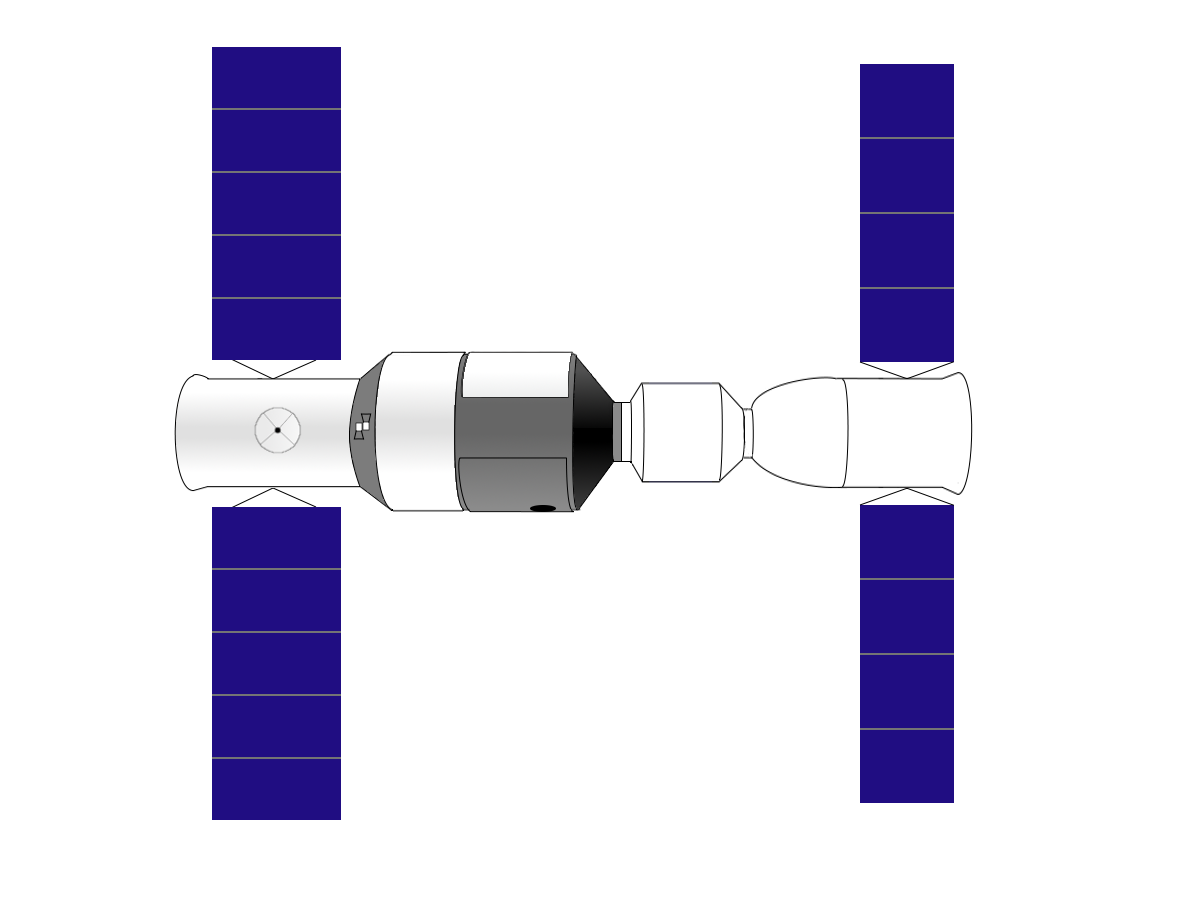
Diagram of Tiangong-1 (left) docked to a Shenzhou spacecraft (right)

The uncrewed Shenzhou 8 mission successfully docked with Tiangong-1 on 2 November 2011 UTC, marking China's first orbital docking. Shenzhou 8 undocked from Tiangong-1 on 14 November 2011, before successfully completing a second rendezvous and docking, thus testing the reusability of the docking system. Shenzhou 8 deorbited on 17 November 2011, and landed intact in Siziwang Banner in Inner Mongolia. After the mission, the CNSA reported that Tiangong-1's systems were in optimal condition.

=== Crewed missions ===
==== Preparations ====
In December 2011, the Tiangong-1 module began automated internal checks for toxic gas, to ensure that its interior would be safe for astronauts to enter. In January 2012, reports emerged in British publication Spaceflight alleging that the American Boeing X-37B robotic spaceplane was shadowing Tiangong-1 for surveillance purposes. However, former United States Air Force orbital analyst Brian Weeden later refuted this claim, emphasizing that the X-37B occupied a 100 degree right ascension offset orbit from Tiangong-1, and would not be able to closely observe the module as they would only pass each other twice an orbit at a closing speed of 7 km/s.

==== Shenzhou 9 (Expedition 1) ====
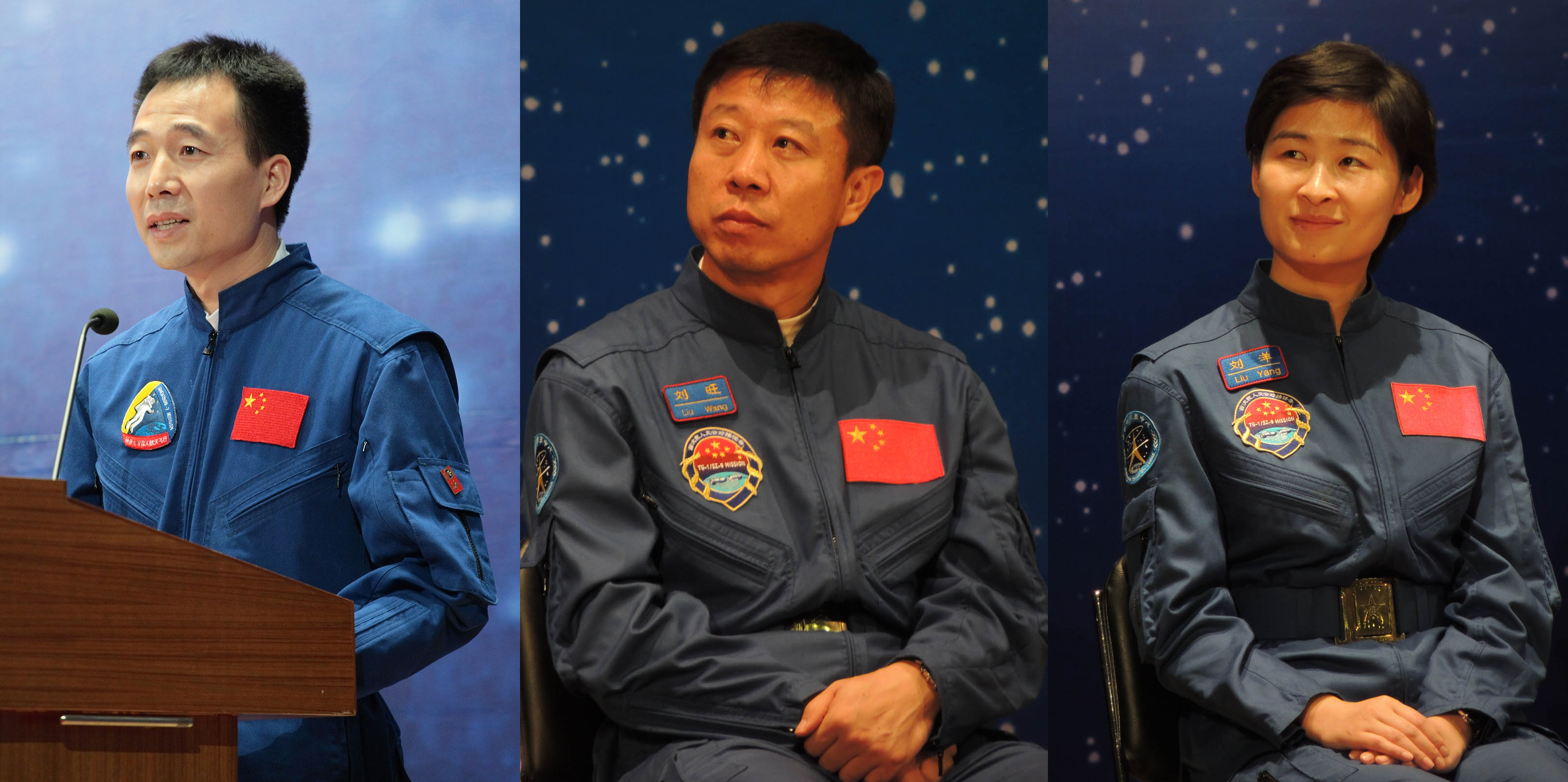
The three members of Shenzhou 9's crew. Liu Yang, China's first female astronaut, is shown on the right.

In March 2012, it was reported that China had finished the initial crew selection for the Shenzhou 9 mission. Niu Hongguang, the deputy chief commander of the China Manned Space Engineering Office, stated that Shenzhou 9 would dock with Tiangong-1 before August 2012. The Shenzhou 9 spacecraft was delivered to Jiuquan Satellite Launch Center for launch preparations on 9 April 2012, while its Long March 2F launch vehicle arrived a month later on 9 May 2012.

Shenzhou 9 launched successfully on 16 June 2012, carrying with it China's first female astronaut, Liu Yang. The spacecraft docked with Tiangong-1 on 18 June 2012 at 06:07 UTC (14:07 Beijing time). After about three hours, when the air pressures inside the two vessels were equalized, mission commander Jing Haipeng entered Tiangong-1. The first docking was entirely computer-controlled, without input from the three astronauts; a second, crew-guided docking was successfully conducted on 24 June 2012 at 20:42 UTC (12:42 Beijing time). Shenzhou 9 landed safely in Inner Mongolia on 29 June 2012. In August 2012, Shenzhou 9's crew travelled to Hong Kong to discuss their mission with university students.

==== Shenzhou 10 (Expedition 2) ====
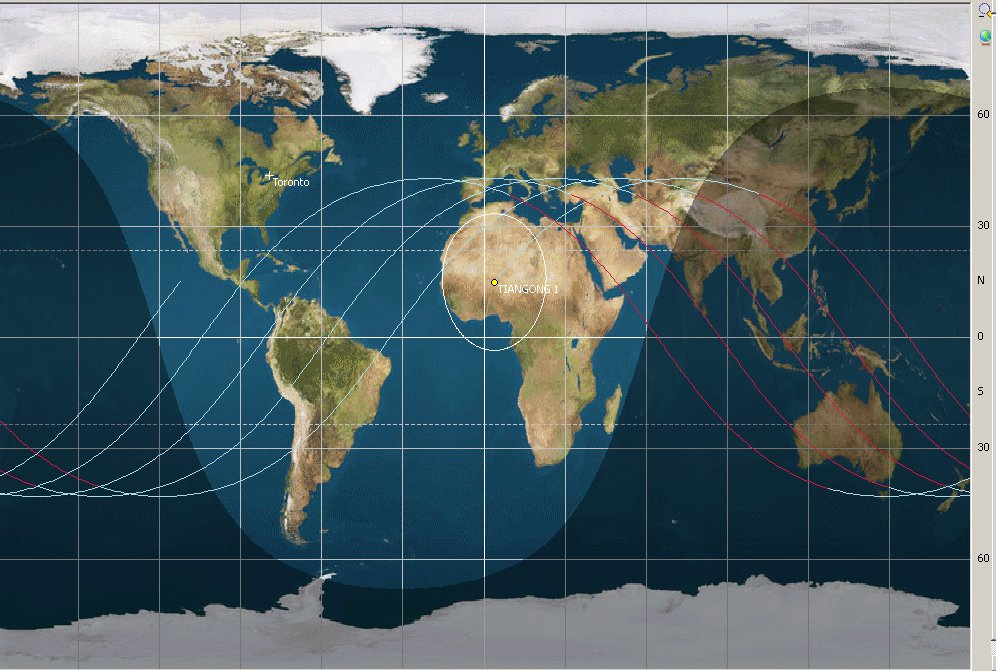
Map of Tiangong-1's orbits in June 2013

The crewed Shenzhou 10 spacecraft, the final Shenzhou mission to rendezvous with Tiangong-1 before its deorbit, was launched on 11 June 2013. The launch of Shenzhou 10 was originally planned for earlier in the year, but was delayed to allow the mission to incorporate more complex scientific experiments. The mission's crew included China's second female astronaut, Wang Yaping. Shenzhou 10 docked successfully with Tiangong-1 on 13 June 2013.

On 15 June 2013, the Shenzhou 10 crew completed China's first orbital maintenance operation, replacing Tiangong-1's interior cladding. Additional maintenance work was conducted on the space station's seal rings. On 20 June 2013, Wang Yaping delivered a remote video lecture from orbit to students across China, demonstrating physics in microgravity with her colleagues. On 24 June 2013, CPC general secretary Xi Jinping contacted the astronauts via remote video link to congratulate them. After a series of successful docking tests, Shenzhou 10 undocked and returned safely to Earth on 26 June 2013. With a duration of 15 days, Shenzhou 10 was China's longest crewed space mission, until Shenzhou 11's 30-day mission to Tiangong-2 in 2016.

== Post-mission ==
The Tiangong-1 was launched in September 2011, with an intended service span of two years. After the last crew departed the module in June 2013, it was put into sleep mode. It was intended that it would remain in orbit for some time, allowing China to collect data on the longevity of key components before being commanded to gradually re-enter the atmosphere. The Permanent mission of China to the United Nations (Vienna) informed the United Nations Committee on the Peaceful Uses of Outer Space that communication with Tiangong-1 had ceased functioning on 16 March 2016. One week later on 21 March 2016, the China Manned Space Engineering Office announced that they had officially disabled data service and ended the mission. According to the office, the space laboratory was under continued and close monitoring until it finally burned up in the Earth's atmosphere during an uncontrolled re-entry.

=== Re-entry ===
Altitude of Tiangong-1 from March 2017

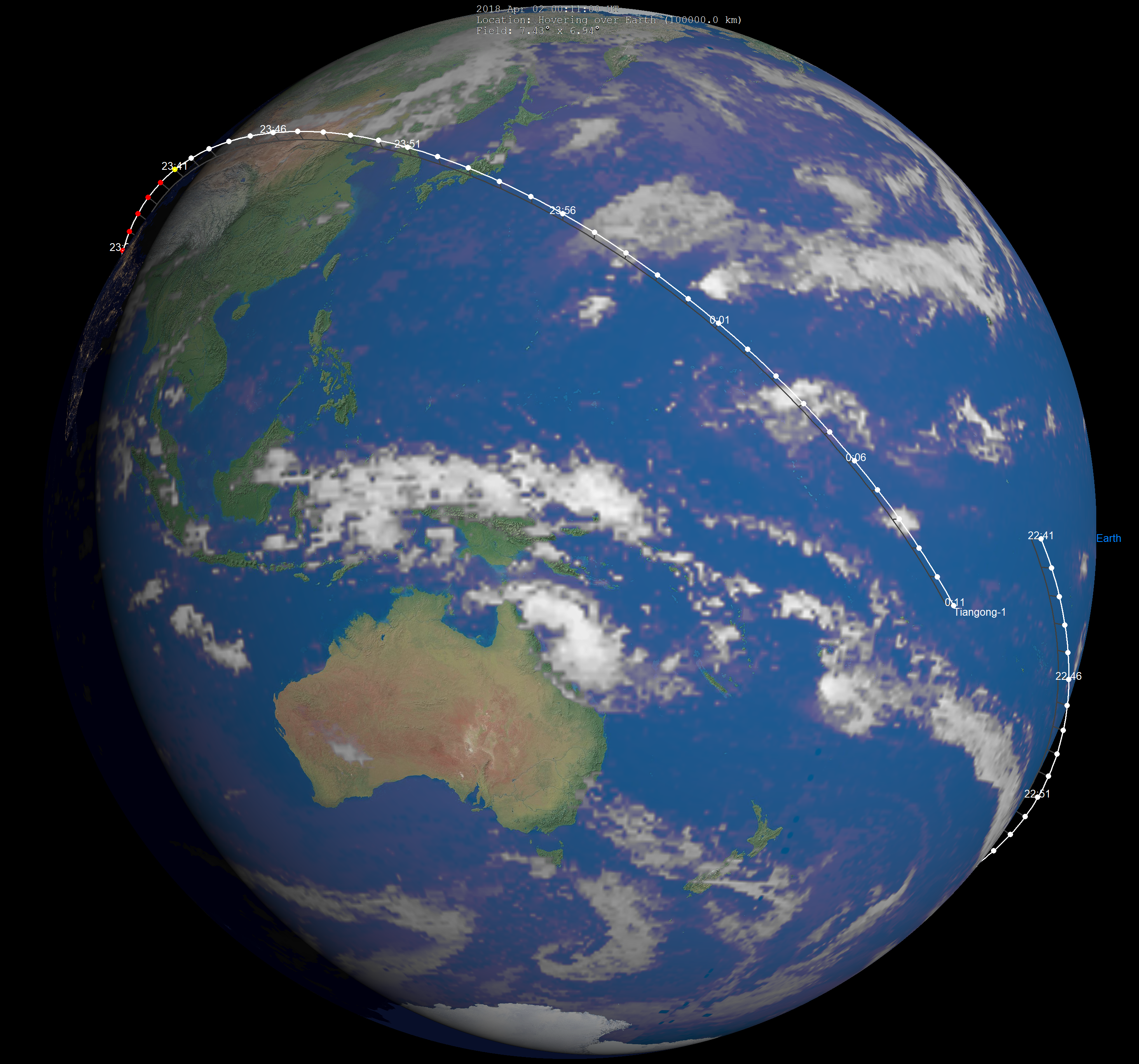
Final orbit above the Pacific Ocean with 1 minute markers

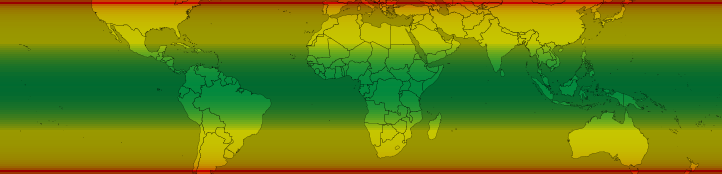
Map showing the probability of re-entry of Tiangong 1 by latitude. Latitudes shaded red were most likely; latitudes shaded green were least likely. Areas outside possible re-entry latitudes are not pictured.

The orbit of Tiangong-1 decayed gradually, and the space laboratory was predicted to be destroyed upon re-entry into Earth's atmosphere.

At the request of China and the United Nations Office for Outer Space Affairs (UNOOSA), the Inter-Agency Space Debris Coordination Committee (IADC), led by the European Space Agency (ESA), conducted an international campaign to monitor the re-entry of Tiangong-1. ESA's Space Debris Office in Darmstadt, Germany hosted and administered the campaign, with participation from other space agencies and organizations including the China National Space Administration (CNSA), the Indian Space Research Organisation (ISRO), the Japan Aerospace Exploration Agency (JAXA), the Korea Aerospace Research Institute (KARI), and Roscosmos of Russia. The IADC predicted that Tiangong-1 would break up during re-entry, but that parts of the station would survive and fall to the Earth's surface, potentially falling across an area thousands of kilometres long and tens of kilometres wide. However, because most of the re-entry area was ocean or uninhabited land, the IADC stated that the odds of a person being hit by falling debris to be "10 million times smaller than the yearly chance of being hit by lightning". The IADC's final prediction before re-entry was that Tiangong-1 would re-enter at around 01:00 UTC on 2 April 2018, plus or minus 2 hours, falling somewhere on Earth between 42.8° North and 42.8° South latitudes, with the most likely re-entry sites being at the north and south extremes of that range. This is because an inclined orbit has the smallest north-south speed at the extreme latitudes, and the greatest north-south speed near the equator.

Independently, the non-profit Aerospace Corporation's Center for Orbital and Re-entry Debris Studies (CORDS) predicted that Tiangong-1 would most likely re-enter the atmosphere around 00:30 UTC on 2 April 2018, plus or minus 1.7 hours. CORDS scientists also predicted that it would re-enter somewhere between the 42.7° North and 42.7° South latitudes, a range that covered two-thirds of the Earth's surface, with a high likelihood of an ocean landing of whatever did not burn up during re-entry. They predicted that if any parts of the station survived re-entry, the small amount of debris would impact the ground over an area a few hundred square kilometers in size. The final prediction of likely areas for debris impact covered southern South America, Africa, the Middle East, and central Asia. However, even in those high-probability areas, they still estimated the odds of a specific person being hit by debris to be "about one million times smaller than the odds of winning the Powerball jackpot".

Tiangong-1 reentered the Earth's atmosphere at approximately 00:16 UTC on 2 April 2018 over the South Pacific Ocean at 24.5°S 151.1°W. According to Chinese state news agency Xinhua, the station mostly burnt up upon re-entry. A fisherman from the nearby island of Maupiti was able to witness the event. It was the largest spacecraft to re-enter the atmosphere since Fobos-Grunt in January 2012. This was about 3,600 km (1,900 nmi) from Point Nemo, a location often used as a spacecraft cemetery to crash defunct satellites. As the spacecraft made an uncontrolled reentry, this was an unintended coincidence.

Altitude of Tiangong-1 (km)
Date (CST)	Average	Perigee	Apogee	Orbital inclination	Source
20 March 2017	348.3	334.8	361.8	42.8	
14 January 2018	281.3	265.1	297.4	42.77	
14 March 2018	240.8	233.4	248.2	42.68	
15 March 2018	239.5	232.5	246.5	42.67	
16 March 2018	237.8	231.0	244.7	42.66	
17 March 2018	235.9	229.3	242.6	42.66	
18 March 2018	233.8	227.3	240.4	42.65	
19 March 2018	231.8	225.4	238.2	42.65	
20 March 2018	229.3	222.9	235.8	42.65	
21 March 2018	227.0	220.3	233.6	42.64	
22 March 2018	224.8	217.8	231.8	42.64	
23 March 2018	222.4	215.1	229.6	42.64	
24 March 2018	219.4	211.6	227.2	42.65	
25 March 2018	216.2	208.1	224.3	42.65	
26 March 2018	212.0	203.9	220.0	42.65	
27 March 2018	207.7	199.2	216.3	42.66	
28 March 2018	202.3	193.9	210.8	42.67	
29 March 2018	196.4	188.5	204.3	42.67	
30 March 2018	189.5	181.8	197.2	42.68	
31 March 2018	179.0	171.8	186.2	42.69	
1 April 2018	167.6	161.0	174.3	42.70	
2 April 2018	132.75	130.9	134.6	42.70	

== Program developments ==
Tiangong-1 was designed as a test bed for key technologies later used on another test station called Tiangong-2, which was launched on 15 September 2016. Both experimental space stations were short-lived and meant to test technologies and systems for the Tiangong space station, which is planned to be assembled from 2021 to 2022.

The design of Tianzhou, an automated cargo spacecraft intended to resupply the Tiangong space station, is based on Tiangong-1.

== See also ==
- Agena target vehicle
- Chinese space program
- Chinese women in space
- International Space Station
- List of space stations
- Salyut 1
- Skylab
