= Tiangong-3 =

Cancelled Chinese space station module

Tiangong-3 天宫三号
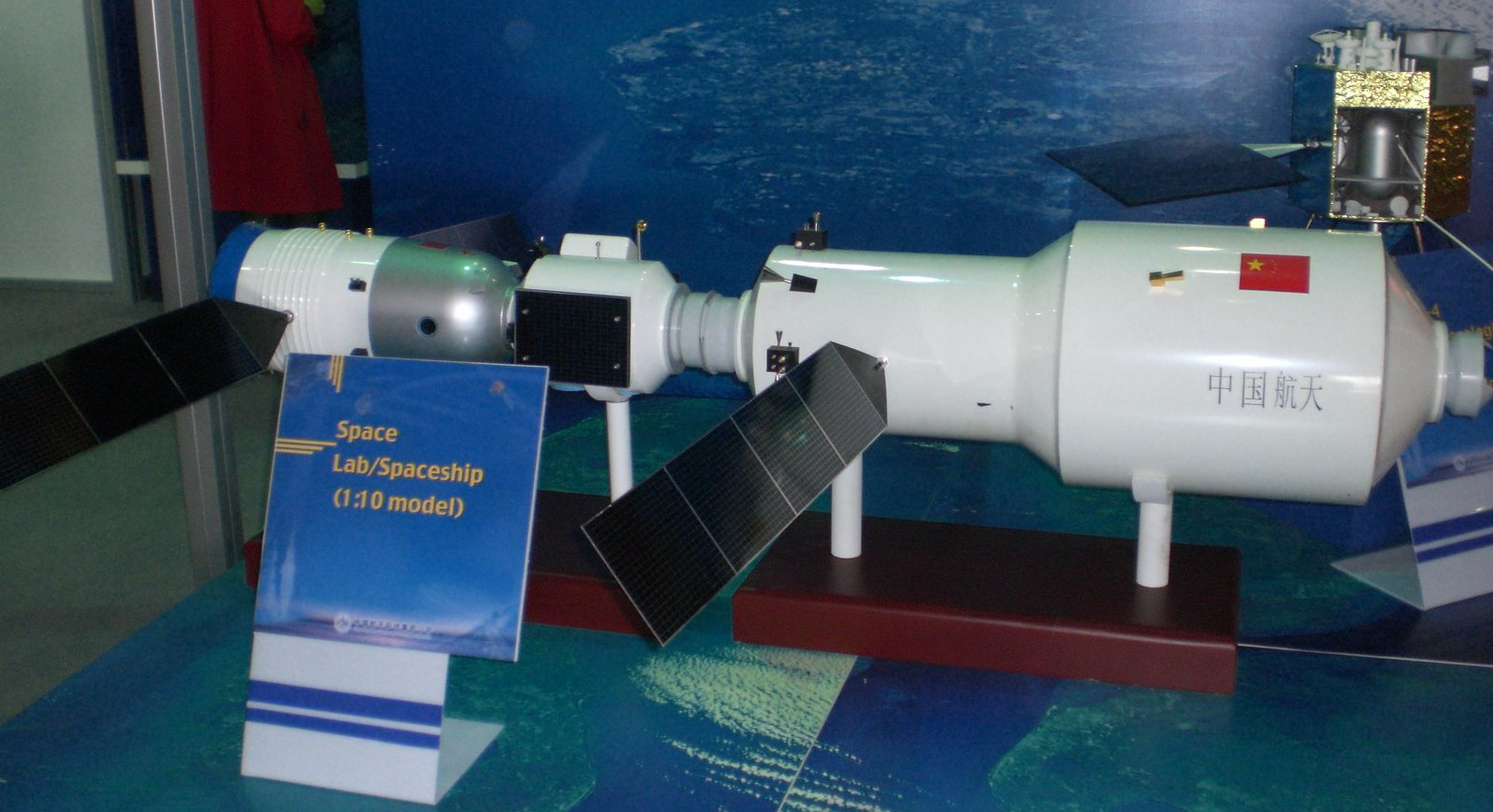

Station statistics
- Crew: 3
- Mission status: Cancelled
- Mass: 22,000 kilograms (49,000 lb)
- Length: 18.1 meters (59 ft)
- Diameter: 4.2 meters (14 ft)

Tiangong-3 (Chinese: 天宫三号; pinyin: Tiāngōng sānhào; lit. 'Heavenly Palace 3') was a proposed Chinese space station that was part of the Tiangong program. The China National Space Agency (CNSA) initially planned to launch Tiangong-3 around 2015, following the launch of the Tiangong-2 test laboratory, which was originally planned for 2013. However, the goals for the Tiangong-2 and Tiangong-3 laboratories were merged, and the latter was not ordered. Eventually, the first module of the third station of the Tiangong program, Tiangong space station, was launched in 2021.

== Development ==
In 2008, the China Manned Space Engineering Office (CMSEO) published a brief description of Tiangong-2 and Tiangong-3, indicating that several crewed spaceships would be launched in the late 2010s to dock with Tiangong-3. The first Tiangong module, Tiangong-1, was launched in September 2011 and successfully docked with the uncrewed Shenzhou 8 spacecraft in November 2011, marking China's first orbital docking.

== Specifications ==
Tiangong-3 was expected to provide:

- Unaided 40-day habitability for three astronauts.
- Testing for regenerative life-support technology and verification of methods of orbital replenishment of propellant and air.
- A multi-docking berthing mechanism, allowing up to two spacecraft to dock with it simultaneously.

== See also ==
- Chinese Lunar Exploration Program
- Chinese space program
- International Space Station
