= Beijing Aerospace Flight Control Center =

Command center for the Chinese space program

Coordinates: 40°4′19.16″N 116°15′25.53″E

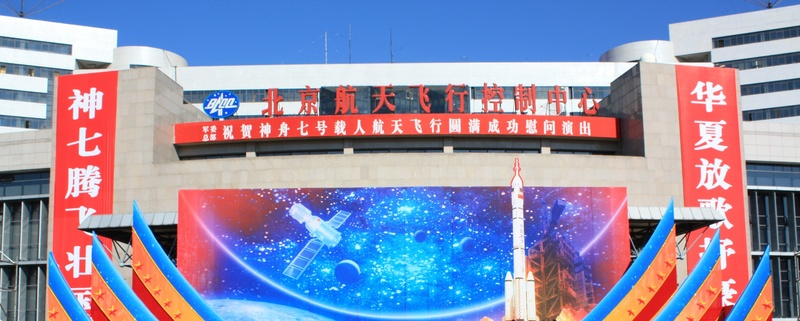
BACC main facility after the Shenzhou-7 mission, preparing for a ceremony.

Beijing Aerospace Flight Control Center (Chinese: 北京航天飞行控制中心), formerly known as Beijing Aerospace Command and Control Center (Chinese: 北京航天指挥控制中心; BACCC or BACC), is a command center for the Chinese space program which includes the Shenzhou missions, and is located in Haidian District, Beijing. The main entrance is located at the intersection of Beiqing Road and Youyi Road.

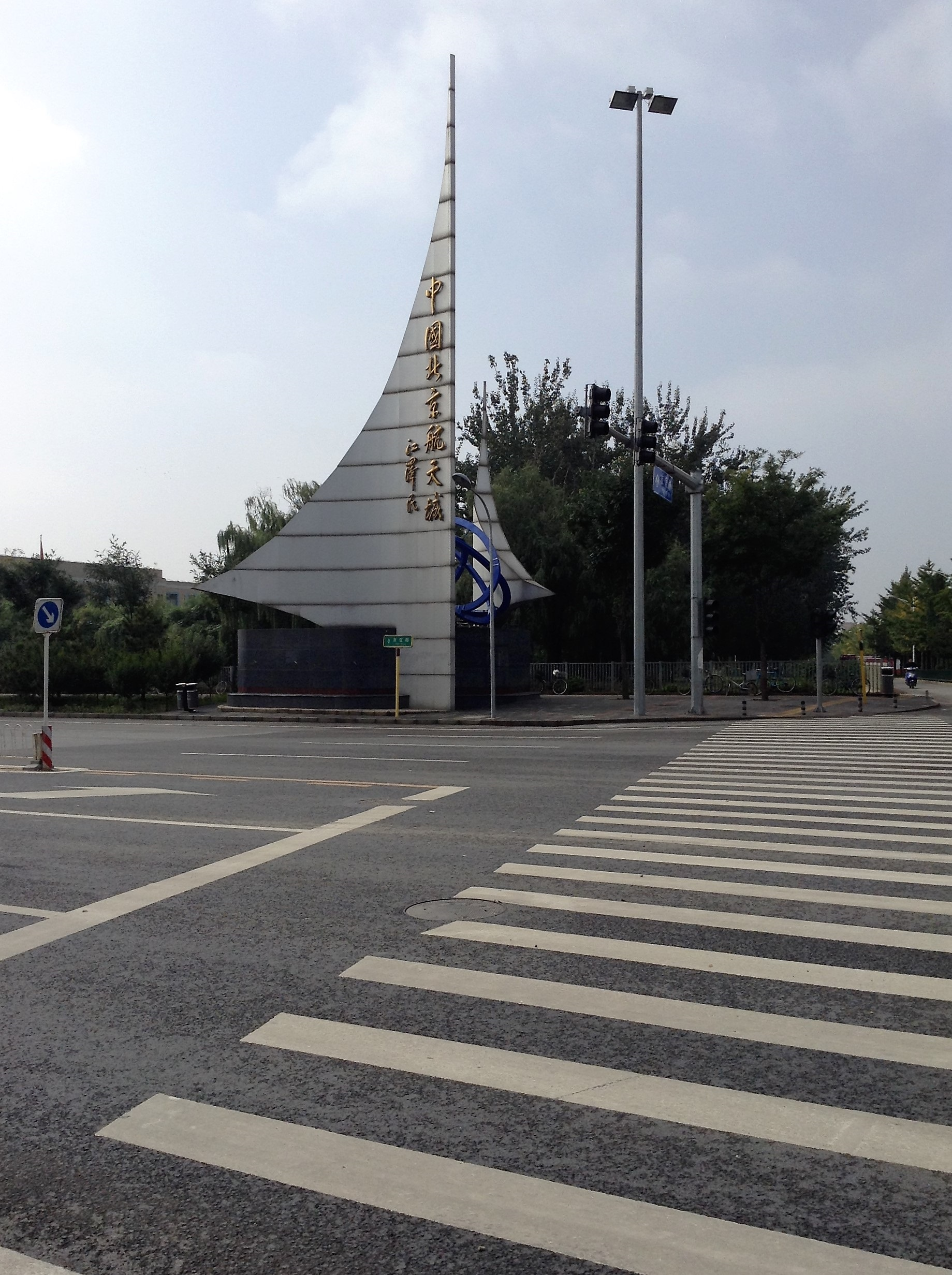
BACC Main Entrance

The BACC is subordinated to the People's Liberation Army's Aerospace Force, controlling both military and civilian launches and satellites.

BACC's primary functions include supervision, telemetry, tracking and command of spacecraft. The building is inside a complex nicknamed Beijing Aerospace City. It was initially created for China's crewed space missions, a.k.a. "Project 921", hence also the name "921" among some insiders. It has evolved to be responsible for the Chang'e 1 mission and the Sino-Russian Interplanetary Space Mission, Fobos-Grunt. The BACC also oversees Shenzhou missions with the help of four Yuan Wang-class tracking ships. It has dedicated subsidiaries for SINOSAT and Inmarsat. It was renamed to 北京航天飞行控制中心 (Beijing Aerospace Flight Control Center) in 2006.

== See also ==
- Xi'an Satellite Control Center
- Chinese space program
