= Kourou Station =

Satellite conunication's support station

Coordinates: 5°15′5.18″N 52°48′16.79″W

Kourou Station (also known as Kourou 93) is an ESTRACK satellite ground station in French Guiana. Two antennas are located at the site: A 15-meter one that receives in X- and S-bands along with smaller 1.3-meter X-band acquisition aid antenna. Additional facilities provide tracking, telemetry, telecommand and radiometric measurements.

Station is located 27 kilometres (17 mi) from the town of Kourou and 19 kilometres (12 mi) from Guiana Space Centre.

During its routine operations it is used for Launch and Early Orbit Phase communication as well as control of the XMM-Newton X-ray observatory. In 2009 new station for a support of Galileo satellites was inaugurated in Kourou Station.
