= Xi'an Satellite Control Center =

Primary satellite control facility of China

Coordinates: 34.251°N 109.018°E

The Xi'an Satellite Tracking, Telemetry, and Control Center (XSCC; Chinese: 西安卫星测控中心; pinyin: Xī'ān wèixīng cèkòng zhōngxīn), also known as Base 26, is the primary satellite telemetry, tracking, and control facility of the People's Republic of China. Located in the Beilin District of Xi'an, Shaanxi Province, XSCC is subordinate to the Satellite Launch, Tracking, and Control Department of the People's Liberation Army Aerospace Force.

== History ==
The history of the Xi'an Satellite Monitor and Control Center began in 1967 with the founding of the Satellite Ground Tracking Department (Chinese: 卫星地面测量部; pinyin: Wèixīng Dìmiàn Cèliáng Bù) in Qiaonan sub-district, Shaanxi on Jiuquan Satellite Launch Center (JSLC, Base 20). On 24 April 1970, when the People's Republic of China (PRC) launched its first artificial satellite, Dong Fang Hong 1, into orbit from JSLC, The Satellite Ground Tracking Department provided the "three grasps" (satellite tracking, telemetry, and control, TT&C) using the newly developed 7010 and Type 110 radars. Upgraded to a center in September 1975, as the PRC increased its testing of satellites, ICBMs, and SLBMs in the early 1980s and the TT&C network grew. The organization evolved into its current form in 1987, moving to Xi'an from Weinan.

By the 1980s, China's TT&C network (Chinese: 航天测控网; pinyin: Hángtiān cèkòng wǎng) consisted of two command and control (C2) centers: the Xi'an Satellite Control (XSCC) and Beijing Aerospace Flight Control Center (BACC), supported by six ground stations: Changchun, Lingshui, Kashgar, Nanning, Weinan, Xiamen, and a series of Yuan Wang-class tracking ships.

The facility was established in Weinan as the "Satellite Survey Department" in 1967, and relocated to Xi'an in 1987. Today, the XSCC comprises a mission control station in Xi'an and a set of tracking arrays located outside the city on a mountain plateau. The tracking station is equipped with antenna farms, masts, and communications dishes, while the mission control station is equipped with television screens, consoles, plotters, and high-speed computers that allow technicians to trace the orbital paths of all Chinese satellites in orbit.

== Organization ==
Xi'an SMCC is the central coordinator for the system of TT&C stations, which include the following subordinate agencies and ground stations:

- Tracking and Control Technology Center (测控技术部)
- Department of Long-Term Spacecraft Management (航天器长期管理部)
- Operations Tracking and Control Recovery Department (活动测控回收部)
  - First Operations TT&C Station (第一活动测控站)
  - Second Operations TT&C Station (第二活动测控站)
  - Landing Site Station (着陆场站)
- Kashgar TT&C Station (喀什测控站) established 1970
- Jiamusi TT&C Station 佳木斯测控站（2007年投入使用）
- Sanya TT&C Station (三亚测控站)（2008年投入使用）
- Changchun TT&C Station (长春测控站)
- Western Fujian TT&C Station (闽西测控站)
- Xiamen TT&C Station (厦门测控站)
- Weinan TT&C Station (渭南测控站
- Nanning TT&C Station (南宁测控站)
- Qingdao TT&C Station (青岛测控站)
- Swakopmund Monitoring and Control Station (纳米比亚测控站)
- Karachi TT&C Station (卡拉奇测控站)
- Malindi TT&C Station (马林迪测控站)
- Neuquén Far Space Station
- El Sombrero TT&C Station
- Amachuma TT&C Station
- Lingshui Station (陵水测控站)
- Menghai Station (勐海测控站)
- Western Hunan Station (湘西站)
- Zhanyi Station (沾益测控站)
- Central Communication Station (通信总站)
- Satellite Monitoring and Control Science and Engineering Museum, located within the Xi'an center's compound. Contains various exhibitions and models of satellites, and allows the public to see the control chamber in operation.
- The Satellite TT&C Equipment Museum (航天测控装备博物馆) in Qiaonan Town, Weinan City, Shanxi Province. Opened in 2010.

The Changchun Satellite Tracking & Control Station (Chinese: 长春测控站; pinyin: Chángchūn Cèkòng Zhàn), located outside of Changchun, Jilin Province, was established in 1968 and operates with the Military Unit Cover Designator (MUCD) Unit 63759. Outfitted with 154-IIB monopulse radar, may be a part of the Chinese Deep Space Network under the Jiamusi Satellite Tracking & Control Station.

The Kashgar Station, MUCD 63783, in the west of Xinjiang Autonomous Region was established in 1968 under Base 26 until Xi Jinping's 2016 military reforms when the organization was moved under the newly created PLASSF.

The Lingshui Control Station on Hainan was established in April 2008 and finds itself responsible for the tracking of Shijian satellites. A 40 meter radome was built in 2012.

== See also ==
- Beijing Aerospace Command and Control Center
- Chinese Space Program
