= Sun Laiyan =

Chinese scientist

- Born: 1957 (age 68–69); Beijing, China
- Education: Xi'an Jiaotong University; Pierre and Marie Curie University

Sun Laiyan (simplified Chinese: 孙来燕; traditional Chinese: 孫來燕; pinyin: Sūn Láiyàn; born October 1957) is a Chinese scientist who served as the Administrator of the China National Space Administration (CNSA) from 2004 to 2010, when he was succeeded by Chen Qiufa.

== Early life ==
Sun was born in Beijing in October 1957.

== Education ==
Sun attended Xi'an Jiaotong University majoring in cryogenic engineering.

== Career ==
After graduating in 1982, Sun joined the Beijing Institute of Satellite Environment Engineering as an Engineering Team Leader. From 1987 to 1993 he attended Paris No. 6 University and received a Ph.D. Moving back to China, he became first the deputy director and the director of the Institute of Satellite Environment Engineering. In 1999, he was made the Vice-Administrator of the CNSA and in 2001 the Secretary General of the Commission of Science, Technology and Industry for National Defense (COSTIND). In 2004, he was appointed Vice-Minister for COSTIND and Administrator for CNSA.

== Personal life ==
Sun is married with one daughter.
