= China's spaceplane program =

Manned Spacecraft sub-system

Spaceplane
Description
Role:	Reusable launch vehicle spaceplane project
Crew:	
Dimensions
Length:	32 m
Wingspan:	
Mass:	140 t
Payload:	4 t

Project 921-3 is a crewed spacecraft sub-system of Project 921. The term 921-3 is often used for the Chinese spaceplane program.

== History ==
The Chinese National Manned Space Program was given the designation of Project 921 in 1992. This broad project was divided into three phases: 921–1 to launch a crewed mission by 2002 in a craft that became the Shenzhou, the Project 921-2 temporary space station by 2010, and the 921-3 permanent space station by 2020. Care must be taken not to confuse the three phases of Project 921 with its seven sub-systems (921–1, 921-2 ... 921–7).

Early planning of Project 921 included six different proposals for a crewed space transportation system. Five of these proposals were of a space-Earth transportation system using a delta winged orbiter. By 1990, the proposal for the Soyuz-like capsule Shenzhou had won out.

Some small models for a spaceplane were made public, but the concept was rejected in favor of a Soyuz-like capsule which became Shenzhou. Concepts for a space shuttle now are only studies. There is no known Chinese government support beyond very basic research for a spaceplane.

Photographs of a two-seat spaceplane simulator were published after 1980, probably belonging to a Chinese Dynasoar-like vehicle. Reports of the existence of a wind tunnel model have continued since then.

== 869 Project ==
After 1986 the Air Ministry starts its 869 Project regarding spaceplane concepts. Up to 1990, the several space-shuttle proposals studied were:

- Tianjiao-1 space shuttle, proposed by China Academy of Launch Vehicle Technology. Totally dependent on the parent rocket booster to reach orbit. 25-ton orbiter, 2-ton payload.
- Chang Cheng-1 (Great Wall-1) space shuttle, proposed by the Shanghai Academy of Spaceflight Technology and 640 Institute of the Air Ministry. 94-ton orbiter launched atop 3 parallel HT-1 SLVs to a 200–500 km orbit. 5-ton payload and maximum of 5 crew members.
- V-2 rocket plane, proposed by the 11th Aeronautics Institute;
- H-2 spaceplane, proposed by Shenyang Aircraft Design Institute. Reusable launch stage weighs 198 tons using dual rocket and ramjet engine for Mach 5+ launch speed. 132-ton orbiter.
- Mini space shuttle, proposed by 611 Aircraft Design Institute;

== Shenlong Test Platform ==
The latest models shown in 2000 reveal a delta winged spaceplane with a single vertical stabilizer, equipped with three high-expansion engines. Presuming a seating arrangement of two crew members siting side-by-side in the cockpit, dimensions could be very roughly estimated as a wingspan of 8 m, a length of 12 m and a total mass of 12 tonnes. This is within the payload capability of the Chinese CZ-2E(A) or Type A launch vehicles.

== HTS Maglev Launch Assist Technology ==
During the 2006 Zhuhai Airshow, pictures of a totally new space vehicle developed by the Beijing University of Aeronautics and Astronautics (北京航空航天大学) were published.

This new Chinese space shuttle was based on the HTS (High Temperature Superconductor) Maglev Launch Assist Technology for Space Flight Vehicle (航天运载器高温超导磁悬浮助推发射技术), with an initial take off speed of 1000 km/h.

== Reusable launch vehicle ==
Concept proposed by China Academy of Launch Vehicle Technology. A 140-ton, 32-metre-length orbiter launched atop a Long March 5 rocket with a payload of 7 tons.

== Shenlong Spaceplane ==
Images of an aerodynamic scaled model, ready to be launched from under the fuselage of a H-6K bomber, were first published in the Chinese media on 11 December 2007. Code named Project 863–706, the Chinese name of this spacecraft was revealed as “神龙”空天飞机 or "Shenlong Space Plane", meaning Divine Dragon in Mandarin. These images, possibly taken in late 2005, show the vehicle's black reentry heat shielding, indicating a reusable design, and its engine assembly. First sub-orbital flight of the Shenlong reportedly took place on 8 January 2011.

Earlier, images of the High-enthalpy Shock Waves Laboratory wind tunnel of the CAS Key Laboratory of high-temperature gas dynamics (LHD) were published in the Chinese media. Test with speed up to Mach 20 where reached around 2001.

== Hypersonic Vehicle ==
According to 'informal sources', another hypersonic vehicle has been tested, which is equivalent to the X-43.

== Tengyun ==
Tengyun is a reusable spaceplane project unveiled in 2016 by China Aerospace Science and Industry Corporation. The spaceplane is composed of two planes, with the larger aircraft acting as a carrier aircraft. A small scale model was shown at the Zhuhai Airshow 2018.
