= Space Solar Telescope =

Proposed Chinese optical telescope

- Alternative names: SST
- Telescope style: proposed optical telescope
- Diameter: 1 m (3 ft 3 in)

The Space Solar Telescope (SST) is a planned Chinese optical space solar telescope. It was first proposed in the 1990s, and is intended to be a 1 metre (3.3 ft) telescope.

== See also ==
- List of solar telescopes
