= Long Lehao =

Chinese aerospace engineer and scientist

- 龙乐豪
- Born: 4 July 1938 (age 88); Hanyang County, Hubei, China
- Education: Shanghai Jiao Tong University
- Scientific career
- Fields: Carrier rocket Aerospace engineering
- Workplaces: China Aerospace Science and Technology Corporation

Chinese name
- Simplified Chinese: 龙乐豪
- Traditional Chinese: 龍樂豪
Transcriptions
Standard Mandarin
- Hanyu Pinyin: Lóng Lèháo

Long Lehao (born 4 July 1938) is a Chinese aerospace engineer and scientist who was the chief designer of Long March expendable launch system rockets and deputy chief designer of the Chinese Lunar Exploration Program.

== Biography ==
Long was born into a family of farming background in Hanyang County (now Wuhan), Hubei, on 4 July 1938. In September 1958, he was accepted to Shanghai Jiao Tong University, where he majored in automatic control. After graduating in July 1963, he was dispatched to the Unit 742 of the People's Liberation Army. He was transferred to the 1st Department of 1st Institute of 7th Ministry of Machinery Industry, which was reshuffled as the Ministry of Aerospace Industry in May 1982. In August 1986, he became deputy chief designer of Long March 3A orbital carrier rocket, rising to chief designer in December 1989. He was vice president of China Academy of Launch Vehicle Technology in November 1993, and held that office until January 2000. In March 2004, he was made deputy chief designer of the Chinese Lunar Exploration Program, and served until April 2009. On 12 December 2019, he was hired as the honorary president of Shangqiu Institute of Technology.

== Honours and awards ==
- 2001 Member of the Chinese Academy of Engineering (CAE)
