= Shenzhou 3 =

2002 Chinese uncrewed spaceflight

- Mission type: Uncrewed test flight
- Operator: China Manned Space Agency
- COSPAR ID: 2002-014A
- SATCAT no.: 27397
- Mission duration: 6 days, 18 hours, 35 minutes
- Orbits completed: 107

Spacecraft properties
- Spacecraft type: Shenzhou
- Manufacturer: China Aerospace Science and Technology Corporation

Start of mission
- Launch date: March 25, 2002, 14:15:04 UTC
- Rocket: Long March 2F (Y3)
- Launch site: Jiuquan, LA-4/SLS-1
- Contractor: China Academy of Launch Vehicle Technology

End of mission
- Landing date: April 1, 2002, 08:51 UTC
- Landing site: Inner Mongolia

Orbital parameters
- Reference system: Geocentric orbit
- Regime: Low Earth orbit
- Inclination: 42.40°

Shenzhou 3 (simplified Chinese: 神舟二号; traditional Chinese: 神舟二號; pinyin: Shénzhōu èr hào) launched on March 25, 2002, was the third unmanned launch of China's Shenzhou spacecraft. This was the first Shenzhou spacecraft launched that could have actually carried a human and as such the main objective of the mission was to test the systems required to support a human in space. On board it carried a dummy to simulate physiological signals of a human — palpitation, pulse, breathing, eating, metabolism, and excretion.

The launch had been delayed several months due to design changes. It had been planned that Shenzhou 3 would use a new interior design but implementation problems meant reverting to the previous version. The rocket and spacecraft were eventually rolled out on the pad during the Fifth Session of the Ninth National People's Congress and the Ninth National Committee of the Chinese People's Political Consultative Conference in early March 2002.

== Orbit ==
It is thought that Shenzhou 3 changed its orbit twice during the mission. The first was on March 29 at 10:15 UTC when the aft maneuvering thrusters fired for about 8 seconds putting it into a 330.2 km x 337.2 km orbit. The second was on March 31. Both times were to raise its orbit. Shenzhou 3 operated in a slightly less inclined orbit of 42.40° to the previous Shenzhou 1 and 2 flights, which were in about 42.59° inclined orbits.

== Scientific payload ==
On board were carried 44 different experiments. These included an imaging spectrograph, cloud sensor, radiation sensor, solar ultraviolet monitor, solar constant monitor, atmospheric composition detector, atmospheric density detector, multi-chamber space crystallization furnace, space protein crystal equipment, a cell bioreactor, a solid matter tracking detector and microgravity gauge. Also on board was a video camera that broadcast images of the Earth as seen through one of the windows on the spacecraft. To test the radio transmitting systems, a pre-recorded female voice was transmitted.

== Reentry ==
Shenzhou 3 reentered and landed successfully after 107 orbits. Unlike Shenzhou 2 where no photos had been released of the landing capsule, this time photos were released confirmed a successful touchdown. As with Shenzhou 2 the Orbital Module stayed in orbit for an extended mission. During this time it made some orbital adjustments, raising its orbit. Although it was speculated that it could serve as a docking target for Shenzhou 4, this did not turn out to be the case. Its mission ended in October 2002 and it reentered on November 12 at about 06:38 UTC over 22°S 109° E over the Indian Ocean off western Australia.

== Launch ==
The launch of Shenzhou 3 was attended by General Secretary of the Chinese Communist Party and President Jiang Zemin. Along with him were Wu Bangguo, member of the Politburo of the Chinese Communist Party and Vice Premier; Zeng Qinghong, alternate member of the Politburo and member of the Secretariat of the Chinese Communist Party; Yu Yongbo, member of the Central Military Commission and director of the People's Liberation Army's General Political Department; and Cao Gangchuan, member of the Central Military Commission and director of the People's Liberation Army's General Armament Department.

== Escape system ==
Shenzhou 3 was the first Long March 2F launch to feature a working launch escape system. Also added were two manual system that would have allowed an astronaut to activate the system in case of emergency. It was tested during the launch phase though Chinese officials did not confirm if the test was successful.

A day after launch China Central Television broadcast an artist impression of the spacecraft in orbit. Of interest was that the front of the orbital module appeared to have been equipped with three seven element log-periodic antennae. It is thought that it was designed for a frequency range of 300–1000 MHz. Also shown was an animation of the orbital module after it had separated from the rest of the spacecraft. Three booms were extended from the front package, one left, another right and the third forward. It is speculated that this could have been some sort of ELINT package.

== See also ==
- Chinese space program
- Tiangong program
- Shenzhou spacecraft
- Long March rocket
- Jiuquan Satellite Launch Center
