= Shenzhou 4 =

2002 Chinese uncrewed spaceflight

- Mission type: Uncrewed test flight
- Operator: China Manned Space Agency
- COSPAR ID: 2002-061A
- SATCAT no.: 27630
- Mission duration: 6 days, 18 hours, 36 minutes
- Orbits completed: 108

Spacecraft properties
- Spacecraft type: Shenzhou
- Manufacturer: China Aerospace Science and Technology Corporation

Start of mission
- Launch date: December 29, 2002, 16:40 UTC
- Rocket: Long March 2F (Y4)
- Launch site: Jiuquan, LA-4/SLS-1
- Contractor: China Academy of Launch Vehicle Technology

End of mission
- Landing date: January 5, 2003, 11:16 UTC
- Landing site: Inner Mongolia (40°31′N 111°23′E)

Orbital parameters
- Reference system: Geocentric orbit
- Regime: Low Earth orbit

Shenzhou 4 (simplified Chinese: 神舟四号; traditional Chinese: 神舟四號; pinyin: Shénzhōu sì hào) was launched on December 29, 2002 as the fourth uncrewed launch of the Chinese Shenzhou spacecraft. Two dummy astronauts were used to test the life support systems (a live astronaut was not used until Shenzhou 5 on October 15, 2003).

The spacecraft was equipped for a crewed flight, even featuring a sleeping bag, food, and medication. The windows were constructed of a new material that was designed to stay clear even after reentry to allow an astronaut to confirm that the parachutes have deployed properly. It was said that the spacecraft flown on Shenzhou 4 had no major differences to that used on Shenzhou 5. It flew with the ability for manual control and emergency landing, systems needed for a crewed flight. A week before the launch, astronauts trained in the spacecraft to familiarise themselves with its systems.

Initially the spacecraft was in a 198 kilometres (123 mi) by 331 kilometres (206 mi) orbit inclined at 42.4°. This was raised to 330 kilometres (210 mi) by 337 kilometres (209 mi) at 23:35 UTC on December 29, 2002. On January 4 and January 5, 2003 several smaller manoeuvres were thought to have taken place. The rate of orbital decay seemed higher after January 1, suggesting that the orbital module's solar panels may have been deployed for the first time. Compared to Shenzhou 3 the orbital period of Shenzhou 4 was much more tightly bounded with smaller manoeuvres.

The launch of Shenzhou 4 was watched by officials including Chairman of the National People's Congress Li Peng; Vice Premier and member of the Politburo Standing Committee Wu Bangguo; Jia Qinglin, also a member of the Standing Committee; Cao Gangchuan, vice-chairman of the Central Military Commission; Song Jian, vice-chairman of the Chinese People's Political Consultative Conference; and Li Jinai, head of the General Armament Department of the People's Liberation Army. According to the weather forecast, the launch site was -29°C.

The spacecraft carried 100 peony seeds to investigate the effect of weightlessness on plants grown from them. The 52 experiments onboard investigated areas in physics, biology, medicine, earth observation, material science, and astronomy.

Four tracking ships were used for the mission — one off the coast of South Africa in the South Atlantic Ocean, one in the Indian Ocean near Western Australia, one in the North Pacific Ocean south of Japan, and one in the South Pacific Ocean west of New Zealand.

The reentry module landed safely about 40 kilometres (25 mi) from Hohhot, Inner Mongolia. As with previous flights, the command for reentry to begin was given by a tracking ship off the coast of South Africa. It was thought before the flight that the Chinese would attempt a water landing to test the emergency system but this did not happen. The orbital module remained in orbit until September 9, 2003.

== See also ==
- Chinese space program
- Tiangong program
- Shenzhou spacecraft
- Long March rocket
- Jiuquan Satellite Launch Center
