= Wang Jie (taikonaut) =

Chinese astronaut (born 1989)

- 王杰
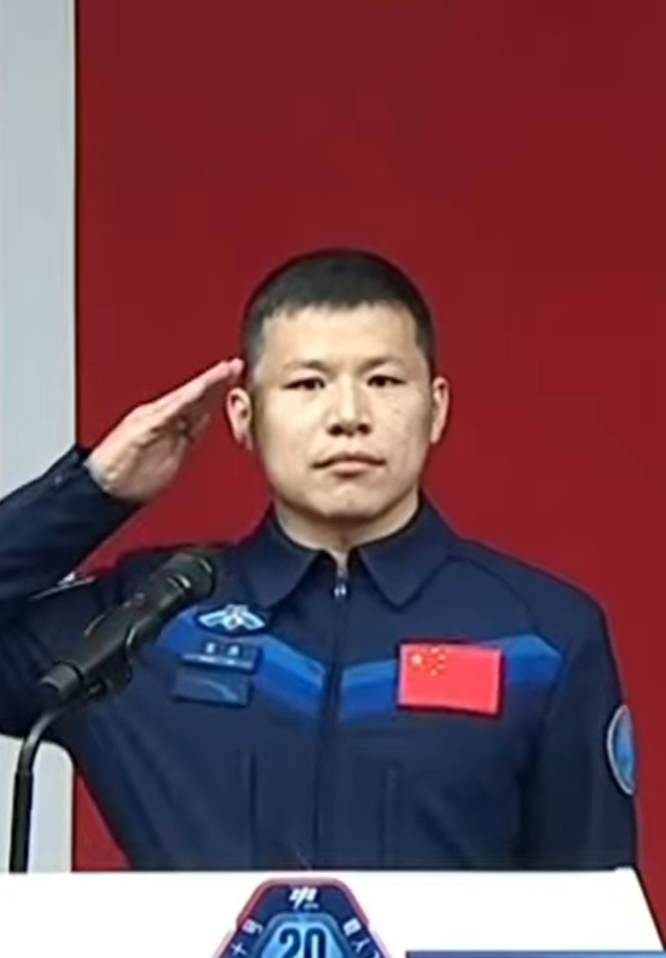
- Born: September 1989 (age 37); Bayannur, Inner Mongolia, China
- Space career

PLAAC astronaut
- Status: Active
- Rank: Lieutenant colonel, People's Liberation Army Air Force
- Time in space: 203 days, 23 hours and 23 minutes
- Selection: Chinese Group 3 (2020)
- Missions: Shenzhou 20/21

Wang Jie (Chinese: 王杰; born September 1989) is a Chinese People's Liberation Army Astronaut Corps (PLAAC) taikonaut. Selected as part of the Shenzhou program, he flew to the Tiangong space station as part of the Shenzhou 20 mission.

== Biography ==
Wang Jie was born in a small mountain village in Urad Front Banner, Bayannur League, Inner Mongolia in 1989. He attended middle school in the county seat of Urad Front Banner and learned about the news that Yang Liwei landed smoothly in Siziwang Banner, Inner Mongolia on the Shenzhou 5 spacecraft, which left a deep impression on him. He received a bachelor's degree in aircraft manufacturing from Shenyang Aerospace University and a master's degree and a doctorate in mechanics from Beijing University of Aeronautics and Astronautics.

During his postgraduate study, Wang Jie began to get involved in aerospace-related scientific research projects, hoping to become a Chinese aerospace technician. After graduating with a doctorate, he joined the Manned Spaceflight Department of the China Academy of Space Technology of the China Aerospace Science and Technology Corporation, where he worked in research and development. He served as the overall technical leader for the key technology research on micro-vibration suppression of the Tiangong Space Station's optical cabin.

== Astronaut career ==
In September 2020, Wang Jie was selected as one of the third batch of astronauts.

On April 24, 2025, Wang launched on the Shenzhou 20 mission to the Tiangong space station, where he is currently serving as flight engineer.

== See also ==
- List of Chinese astronauts
- Tiangong space station
