= Shenzhou (spacecraft) =

Class of crewed spacecraft from China

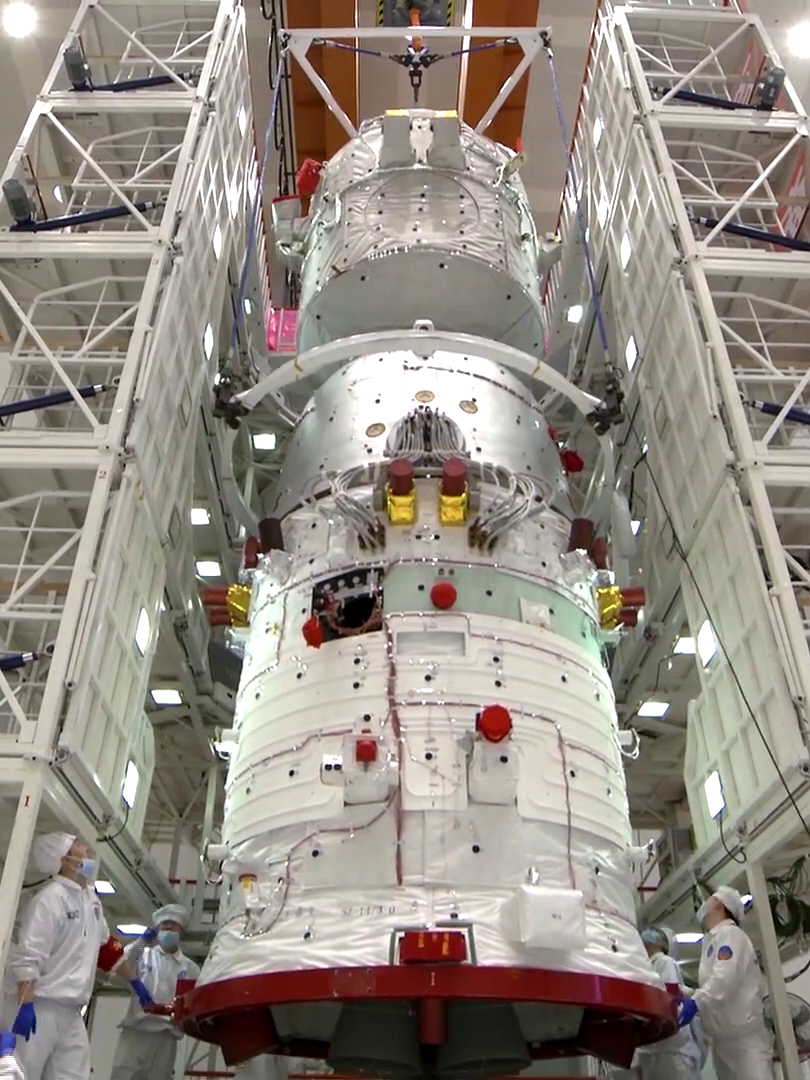
- Shenzhou 14 undergoing ground testing without solar panels in 2022
- Manufacturer: China Aerospace Science and Technology Corporation
- Designer: China Academy of Space Technology (overall design); Shanghai Academy of Spaceflight Technology (service module and subsystems)
- Country of origin: China
- Operator: China Manned Space Agency
- Applications: Crewed spaceflight

Specifications
- Launch mass: 7,840 kg (17,280 lb)
- Crew capacity: 3
- Dimensions: 9.25 × 2.8 m (30.3 × 9.2 ft)
- Volume: Habitable: 14 m^{3} (490 cu ft)
- Regime: Low Earth
- Design life: Free flight: 7 days; Docked at Tiangong: ≈270 days

Production
- Status: In service
- Launched: 23 (17 crewed)
- Operational: 1 (23)
- Failed: 2 (2 and 20)
- Maiden launch: Uncrewed: 19 November 1999 (Shenzhou 1); Crewed: 15 October 2003 (Shenzhou 5)

Shenzhou (Chinese: 神舟; pinyin: Shénzhōu, /ˈʃɛnˈdʒoʊ/ shen-JOH; see § Etymology) is a Chinese spacecraft developed for the China Manned Space Program. Debuting with the uncrewed Shenzhou 1 on 19 November 1999, the spacecraft has logged 23 total flights. Human spaceflight operations began on 15 October 2003 with Shenzhou 5, spanning 17 crewed missions, the most recent of which is Shenzhou 23.

Its design is based on the Soyuz, but Shenzhou is larger and incorporates modernized systems. Like Soyuz, Shenzhou is a single-use vehicle composed of three modules; a reentry module housing the crew during launch and reentry, an orbital module which provides additional living space and storage, and a service module for propulsion and power; the latter two are discarded before reentry. All Shenzhou missions have launched on Long March 2F variants from Jiuquan Satellite Launch Center and landed in Inner Mongolia.

Up to two Shenzhou craft are typically docked to China's Tiangong modular space station, complemented by an unmanned Tianzhou cargo spacecraft. Shenzhou missions previously docked with the Tiangong-1 and Tiangong-2 space laboratories. It is slated to be replaced by the next-generation Mengzhou, currently in development, which has a two-module configuration.

== Etymology ==
The name Shenzhou (神舟; Shénzhōu) means "divine vessel" and evokes a vessel traveling on the Heavenly River (天河), the Classical Chinese name for the Milky Way. (Note: The "divine vessel" gloss for Shenzhou is also the translation frequently used by Chinese state media, including Xinhua, China Daily, and People's Daily. Various other sources have also translated the name as "magic vessel", "celestial vessel", "divine craft", or "god ship".) It is also a homophonous pun on the identically pronounced 神州, a poetic name for China meaning "divine realm". The calligraphy of the spacecraft's name and its Long March 2F carrier rocket (神箭; Shénjiàn; "divine arrow") was written by President Jiang Zemin.

Shenzhou was selected in 1994 as the name for the first Chinese manned spacecraft after a call for suggested names among participating organizations in the space program. Other proposed names included 华夏; Huáxià; "Huaxia", 九州; Jiǔzhōu; "Nine Provinces" (both archaic and poetic names for China) as well as 腾龙; Ténglóng; "Soaring Dragon".

== History ==
=== Origins and initial planning ===
China's first efforts at human spaceflight began in 1967 with the Shuguang spacecraft, then projected to launch in 1973. Shuguang was a two-person design that broadly resembled the Gemini spacecraft. Despite the successful launch in 1970 of Dong Fang Hong 1, China's first satellite, funding shortages resulted in the cancellation of the Shuguang spacecraft in 1972 and the rest of the program in 1980.

After the establishment of the 863 Program in 1986, intensive meetings by a committee convened by the program to evaluate human spaceflight options began in 1988 and continued until 1991. According to China Youth Daily, the committee considered the possibility of building a spaceplane-like system for the nascent manned space program, but ultimately rejected the concept on the grounds of cost and technical feasibility. Discussants pointed out that the American Space Shuttle incurred launch costs far beyond China's financial capabilities, the Soviet Buran had only flown once, and ESA was struggling with the development of their Hermes spaceplane. With the approval of Premier Li Peng, it was decided that the program would utilize a simpler space capsule design with a target launch around 1998-99 (争八保九; zhēng bā bǎo jiǔ; "strive for 1998 and guarantee 1999").

After the capsule approach was selected, debate continued over whether to use a two-module or three-module design. Wang Yongzhi advocated a three-module design similar to the Soyuz TM, under the reasoning that the orbital module could be left in orbit and continue to perform scientific experiments and serve as a target for docking tests. Others advocated for a two-module design, arguing that such a design was safer and allowed for a simpler launch escape system. The issue was ultimately resolved by a vote, with Ren Xinmin breaking a tie in favor of the three-module design. While a design placing the reentry module on top was considered for ease of launch escape, the final configuration placed it in the middle.

=== Development ===
China's crewed space program was officially relaunched on 21 September 1992 with the approval of Project 921 by the Politburo Standing Committee. "Phase One" of the project focused on developing the manned spacecraft that would eventually become Shenzhou. Primary development of the spacecraft was led by the China Academy of Space Technology (CAST), with the Shanghai Academy of Spaceflight Technology (SAST) responsible for its service module and three subsystems.

==== Cooperation with Russia ====
Subsequently, China and Russia concluded a series of bilateral agreements on space cooperation (including human spaceflight) in 1992, (Note: 《中华人民共和国政府和俄罗斯联邦政府关于和平利用与研究宇宙空间方面进行合作的协定》, signed on 18 December 1992.) 1994, (Note: 《中国国家航天局和俄罗斯航天局关于和平利用与研究宇宙空间方面进行合作的议定书》, signed on 25 March 1994.) and 1996.

Russian space officials state that China purchased a bare-bones Soyuz reentry capsule from Energia and various pieces of hardware (some obsolete) in 1995, but there was little exchange between space-related corporations after the first half of 1990s. According to Brian Harvey, the Chinese program acquired a spacecraft life-support system, a Sokol space suit, a docking module, a Kurs docking system from Russia in addition to the stripped-down Soyuz reentry capsule. Another Chinese report additionally notes the purchase of an obsolete Soyuz launch-escape motor for $800,000 that turned out to be empty. Chinese military pilots Wu Jie and Li Qinglong also underwent cosmonaut training in Russia in 1996–1997.

Contrary to the 1999 Cox Report produced by the U.S. House of Representatives, (Note: The Cox Report stated: "For its manned space program, the PRC will use Soyuz capsules purchased during Yeltsin's visit to the PRC in April 1996.") the Chinese space program never acquired a functional or full Soyuz spacecraft, though it was considered and negotiations reportedly fell through.

==== Construction and flight testing ====
The resulting design for the spacecraft closely followed the general layout of the Soviet/Russian Soyuz TM spacecraft, with three modules that could separate for reentry. According to Qi Faren (Chinese: 戚发轫), the spacecraft's first chief designer for the program, the team decided to modify the basic Soyuz design to allow for the orbital module to function independently in space after separation, and enlarged the reentry module as well. The development process was difficult and many systems remained incomplete as the team drew closer to the internal deadline of 1999 for launch. A parachute drop test failed in late 1994 and the complete development of the recovery system did not succeed until 1995. The first payload fairing produced in 1997 exceeded weight limits, and multiple fairing deployment tests initially failed in 1998. A pad abort test subsequently succeeded on 19 October 1998.

In view of the developmental delays, the decision was made to convert an on-ground unit for electrical tests into a full-scale launch prototype for initial launch; the converted reentry module was to be integrated with the service module developed by SAST. Unable to complete its normal engine-testing program before the 1999 launch deadline, SAST agreed to an accelerated schedule and the plan to fly the converted test unit was approved on 9 January 1998. Only eight out of a planned thirteen subsystems for the spacecraft were installed on the prototype. The first uncrewed spacecraft, named Shenzhou 1, was launched on 19 November 1999, narrowly meeting the program’s deadline for its first uncrewed launch by the end of 1999.

The following Shenzhou 2, launched on 9 January 2001, was equipped with life support systems but reportedly experienced a hard landing and the mission was considered a failure by the program. Yang Liwei stated in a 2017 interview that its parachute had failed to deploy. Two additional uncrewed flights, Shenzhou 3 and Shenzhou 4, were subsequently flown. In October 2002, mission planners had approved the initial crewed mission to carry two astronauts for three days, and Shenzhou 4's systems were configured accordingly. The first crewed flight was ultimately reduced to a single crew member (Yang Liwei) for a mission of approximately one day and launched on 15 October 2003 as Shenzhou 5.

The orbital modules of Shenzhou missions 2-6 stayed in space for up to several months after the reentry of the main spacecraft. The spacecraft has since become the mainstay of the Chinese crewed space program, being used for both crewed and uncrewed independent missions and regular missions to Tiangong.

Following Shenzhou 5, Zhang Bainan (Chinese: 张柏楠) succeeded Qi Faren as chief designer of the spacecraft system in January 2004, overseeing the development of Shenzhou 6 through Shenzhou 11. In 2021, Jia Shijin (Chinese: 贾世锦) was appointed chief designer, taking responsibility for the Shenzhou's overall technical design as it began regular missions to Tiangong.

==== Program costs ====
According to a 2004 report by Zhou Xiaofei (Chinese: 周晓飞), director of the manned spaceflight office at the China Aerospace Science and Technology Corporation, CN¥ 10 billion had been spent on Shenzhou spacecraft, launch vehicles and seven major systems of China's crewed space program (excluding spaceport construction) at that point in time. Each of the first four uncrewed test flights had cost approximately CN¥ 900 million for hardware and expenses, while a crewed launch had an estimated cost of CN¥ 1 billion.

=== Spacecraft evolution ===
Unlike the Soyuz, the Shenzhou spacecraft has never had officially defined variants. Nevertheless, its equipment and capabilities have evolved significantly since its maiden flight.

==== Shenzhou 1 ====
Shenzhou 1 was a converted ground-test prototype that served as a developmental demonstrator but lacked major spacecraft subsystems. Its orbital module lacked a deployable solar array.

==== Shenzhou 2-6 ====
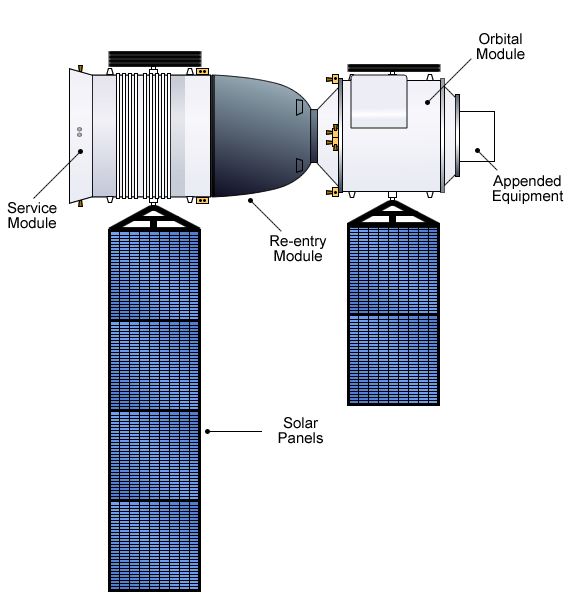
Diagram of the Shenzhou 2-6 spacecraft.

Shenzhou 2 was the first complete prototype of the Shenzhou and subsequent versions up to and including Shenzhou 6 had an orbital module that was equipped with its own propulsion, solar power, and control systems, allowing autonomous flight. It was originally envisioned that the orbital module would be left in orbit for redocking with a later launched spacecraft, and that for future missions, the orbital module(s) could also be left behind on a planned Project 921/2 space station as additional station modules. This modular capability was ultimately not used for the Tiangong space station.

==== Shenzhou 7 ====
Shenzhou 7 removed the independent orbital capability of the orbital module, including RCS thrusters and its solar array, in order to reduce the overall weight for its three-person crew and EVA equipment. Through these changes, the module also gained the ability to function as an airlock with the addition of handrails, air bottles, and cameras.

==== Shenzhou 8-11 ====
Spacecraft from Shenzhou 8 onwards have been equipped with the Chinese Docking Mechanism as well as microwave radar, LiDAR, and CCD sensors for autonomous rendezvous with other spacecraft. Shenzhou 11 introduced further upgrades for long-term missions, including a new wide-beam relay communication terminal and rendezvous distance-measuring equipment.

==== Shenzhou 12-present ====
Beginning with Shenzhou 12, spacecraft have been manufactured in batches for regular missions to Tiangong, with design upgrades being progressively introduced. Shenzhou 12 added autonomous rapid rendezvous and docking (6.5 hours, later reduced to 3.5 hours from Shenzhou 21 onwards), increased landing accuracy, and the capability to remain docked to the space station for 180 days (later increased to 270 days). Shenzhou 13 demonstrated a quick-return capability that shortened the spacecraft's return to earth to five orbits from eleven, and Shenzhou 16 debuted an upgraded relay terminal for improved connections to ground control antennas.

== Design ==
Configuration of Shenzhou since Shenzhou 7

Shenzhou consists of three modules:

- A forward orbital module (Chinese: 轨道舱; pinyin: guǐdào cāng);
- A middle reentry module (Chinese: 返回舱; pinyin: fǎnhuí cāng);
- An aft service module (Chinese: 推进舱; pinyin: tuījìn cāng).

This division is based on the principle of minimizing the amount of material to be returned to Earth. Anything placed in the orbital or service modules does not require heat shielding, increasing the space available in the spacecraft without increasing weight as much as it would if those modules were also able to withstand reentry.

Complete spacecraft (Note: These figures apply to Shenzhou 12.)
Launch mass	8,000 kg (18,000 lb)
Length	9.25 m (30 ft 4 in)
Diameter	2.8 m (9 ft 2 in)
Solar-array span	17 m (55 ft 9 in)

=== Orbital module ===
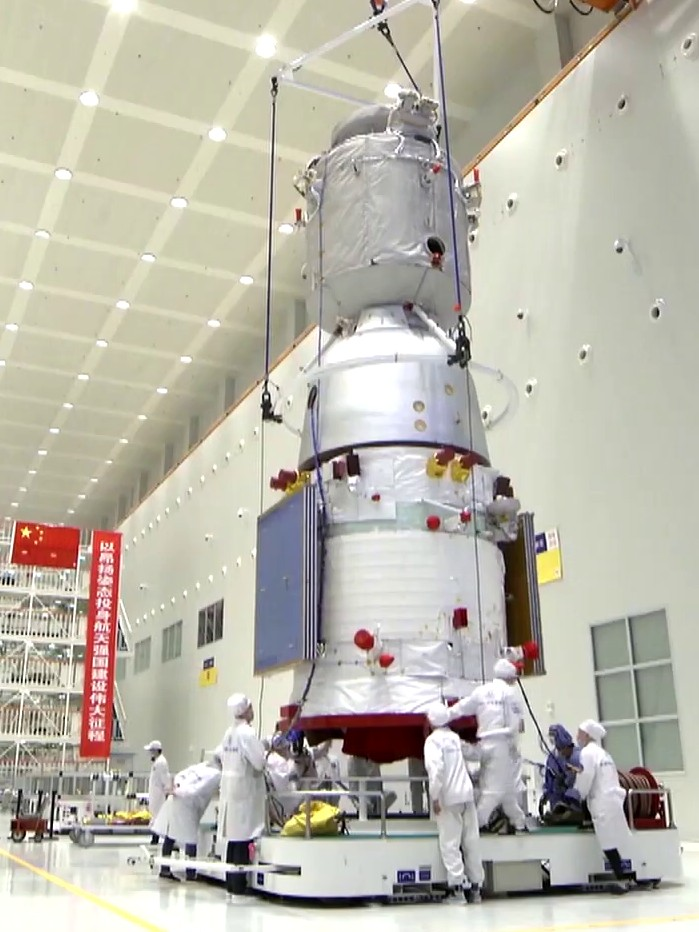
Shenzhou 14 spacecraft undergoing tests prior to launch

The orbital module (Chinese: 轨道舱; pinyin: guǐdào cāng) contains space for experiments, crew-serviced or crew-operated equipment, and in-orbit habitation. The module can carry 300 kilograms (660 lb) of payload. It also contains the spacecraft's toilet.

Shenzhou 1–6 lacked a docking system, and instead carried various payloads at the end of their orbital modules for scientific experiments. The initial design of Shenzhou allowed for an orbital module to be left functioning on orbit; the modules carried sixteen RCS thrusters and fuel, communication equipment, and a smaller solar array. Modules of early flights continued to operate for up to several months after launch. This capability was removed from Shenzhou 7 onwards.

Beginning with Shenzhou 8, all Shenzhou orbital modules have been equipped with rendezvous equipment and the Chinese Docking Mechanism, which is based on the Androgynous Peripheral Attach System (APAS).

Orbital module
Parameter	Early configuration (Shenzhou 2–6)	Later configuration (Shenzhou 7 onward)
Body length	2.8 m (9 ft 2 in)	
Body diameter	2.25 m (7 ft 5 in)	
Solar-array span	10.4 m (34 ft 1 in)	—
Habitable volume	8 m^{3} (280 cu ft)	
Mass	1,500 kg (3,300 lb)	
RCS thrusters	16	—
RCS propellant	Hydrazine	—
Solar-array area	12.24 m^{2} (131.8 sq ft)	—
Power	0.50 kW (average)	—

=== Reentry module ===
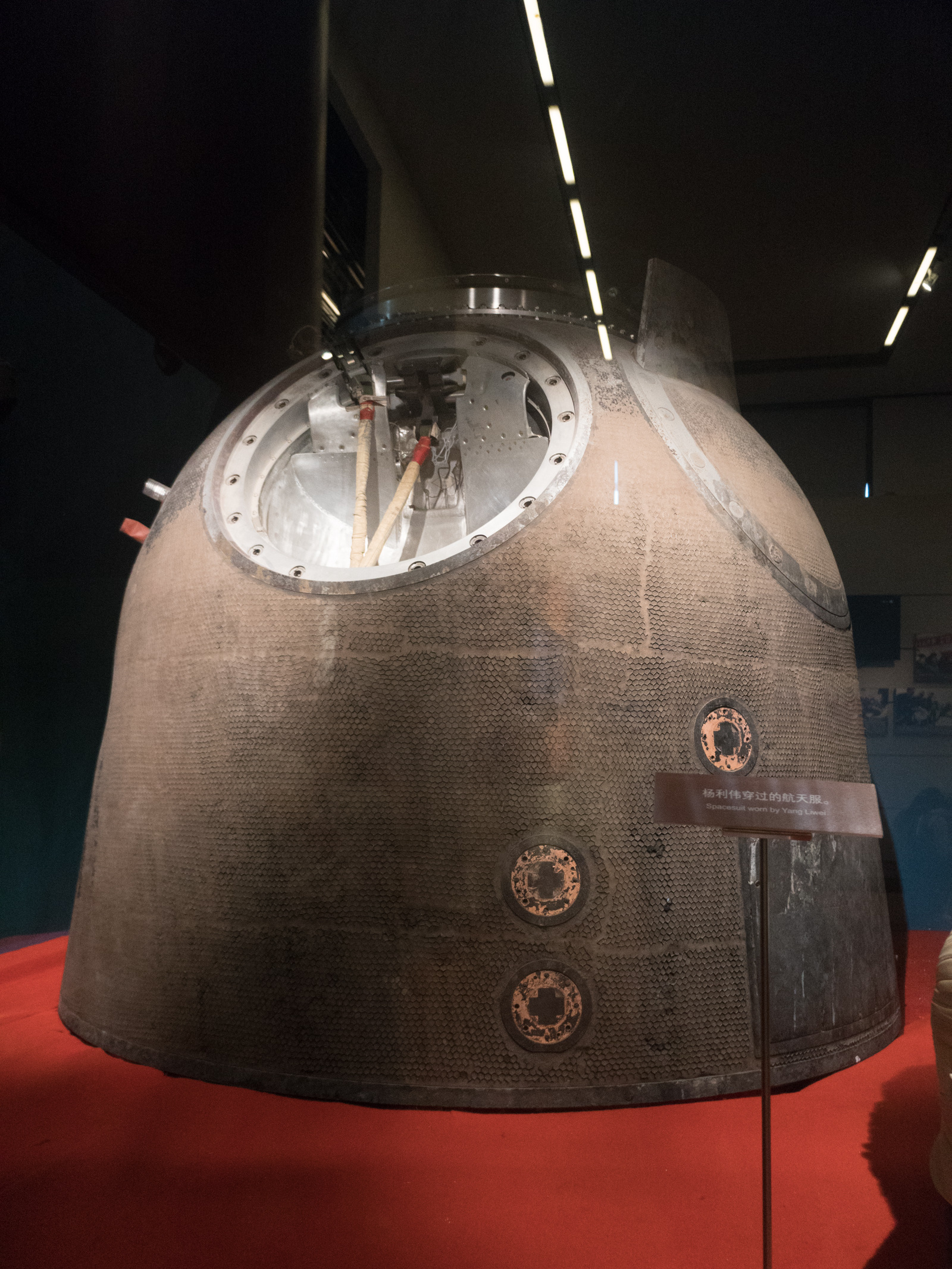
Shenzhou 5's reentry module.

The reentry module (Chinese: 返回舱; pinyin: fǎnhuí cāng) is located in the middle section of the spacecraft and contains seating for the crew in addition to recovery and communication equipment. It is the only portion of Shenzhou which returns to Earth's surface.

==== Structure ====
The reentry module is roughly bell-shaped, similar to other space capsules; its shape is a compromise between maximizing interior space and allowing for some aerodynamic control upon reentry. Both the reentry and orbital modules are manufactured with thin-walled, welded aluminum alloy pressure structures, and are built by the China Academy of Space Technology (CAST) at Beijing Aerospace City.

==== Thermal protection ====
The reentry module's thermal protection consists of layers of heat-resistant materials in addition to the ablative heat shield at the bottom and weighs approximately 500 kg (1,100 lb). The protection is provided by H88 and H96, both materials designed with fiberglass honeycomb supporting lattices and filled with phenyl silicone rubber as a resin matrix. H96 is denser and is used on the heat shield as well as the side of Shenzhou primarily exposed to reentry heat.

The module also features two three-layer heat-resistant windows. (Note: Suspected space debris damage to one of Shenzhou 20's window resulted in its uncrewed return.)

==== Crew systems and accommodations ====
The reentry module is equipped with a glass cockpit that also provides crew with voice alerts and manual controls. Spacecraft starting with Shenzhou 22 feature a smaller and lighter instrument panel that allows the spacecraft to return over 100 kg (220 lb) of cargo to Earth, up from an initial 50 kg (110 lb). On Shenzhou, the mission commander is normally seated in the center, with the monitoring co-pilot seated to their right.

Like most other spacecraft, Shenzhou uses a mixed nitrogen–oxygen cabin atmosphere. Oxygen and nitrogen are supplied separately, with the control system prioritizing oxygen replenishment before adding nitrogen to bring the cabin up to its standard pressure. Nitrogen is also used to compensate for leakage and to re-pressurize the cabin after depressurization, as in the case of an EVA. If a malfunction or leak causes a continuous drop in cabin pressure and reaches a designated emergency limit, the control system will switch to an emergency mode and supply a large amount of air in a short period of time in order to slow the rate of pressure decline, providing sufficient time for crew to put on their spacesuits.

==== Landing and recovery equipment ====
The module contains the parachute system needed for landing and recovery (including a reserve parachute), deployed by an airbag through large circular hatches on the upper side of the module. Under the heat shield, the base of the module contains four solid-fuel braking rockets used in the final moment of touchdown, each weighing approximately 10 kg (22 lb) and measuring less than 30 cm (12 in) in diameter. Each rocket motor produces approximately 29 kN (6,500 lbf) of thrust, giving a combined thrust of approximately 118 kN (27,000 lbf). The braking rockets are automatically triggered by an altimeter and fire near-simultaneously for approximately 200 milliseconds. The reentry module carries a search-and-rescue beacon that transmits an internationally standardized 406 MHz signal after landing, allowing search teams to locate the capsule.

Reentry module
Crew capacity	3
Length	2.5 m (8 ft 2 in)
Diameter	2.52 m (8 ft 3 in)
Internal volume	6 m^{3} (210 cu ft)
Mass	3,240 kg (7,140 lb)
Heat shield mass	450 kg (990 lb)
Lift-to-drag-ratio	≈0.20
RCS	8 × 150 N (34 lb_{f})
RCS propellant	Hydrazine

=== Service module ===
The aft service module (Chinese: 推进舱; pinyin: tuījìn cāng; lit. 'propulsion module') is an unpressurized metal structure that contains life support, electrical systems, and other equipment required for the functioning of Shenzhou, including propulsion. Four engines used for orbital maneuvers and deorbit are distributed around the module's rear section and are separated into a primary and backup pair. Propulsion upgrades since Shenzhou 8 have resulted in the introduction of additional reverse-thrust and translational RCS thrusters to support rendezvous and docking. The RCS thrusters can be used to deorbit the spacecraft in the event of a failure of all four main engines.

Since Shenzhou 7, spacecraft have also only had solar arrays on the service module, with a combined deployed area of approximately 24 square metres (260 sq ft). Unlike the Soyuz, the solar arrays on Shenzhou's service module can rotate relative to the spacecraft to track the Sun. Beginning with Shenzhou 8, an upgraded electrical power system used triple-junction gallium-arsenide solar cells and could supply spacecraft loads exceeding 1.8 kW. Versions from Shenzhou 18 on replaced the main nickel–cadmium batteries with long-life lithium-ion batteries, reducing the overall spacecraft weight by approximately 50 kilograms (110 lb).

Service module
Length	2.94 m (9 ft 8 in)
Basic diameter	2.5 m (8 ft 2 in)
Maximum diameter	2.8 m (9 ft 2 in)
Solar-array span	17 m (55 ft 9 in)
Mass	3,000 kg (6,600 lb)
RCS (coarse)	12 × 150 N (34 lbf) 8 × 120 N (27 lbf); 16 × 25 N (5.6 lbf)
Main engines thrust	4 × 2.5 kN (560 lbf)
Main engines specific impulse	290 s (2.8 km/s)
Fuel	Monomethylhydrazine
Oxidizer	Dinitrogen tetroxide
Propellant mass	1,000 kg (2,200 lb)
Electrical system	Solar panels, 24.48 m^{2} (263.5 sq ft)
Power	1.80 kW+

=== Launch escape system ===
The tower jettison motor of the Long March 2F.

The Shenzhou launch escape system (Chinese: 逃逸塔; pinyin: táoyì tǎ; lit. 'escape tower') is 8.35 metres (27.4 ft) long and is mounted on the top of the rocket along with the payload fairing that encapsulates the spacecraft. The launch escape system can be triggered automatically when a fault is detected. The tower and fairing contain twelve solid-fuel rockets burning aluminium powder for fuel.

The tower is typically jettisoned at an altitude of 39 kilometres (128,000 ft), after which the high-altitude motors serve as the primary launch escape system until fairing separation. Shenzhou's abort modes largely mirror that of Soyuz's; the orbital and reentry modules are separated from the service module by the escape system, after which the reentry module can separate for parachute descent. Outside the atmosphere, Shenzhou can separate from the second stage under its own power.

Shenzhou-Long March 2F launch escape system motors
Motor	Number	Location and configuration	Average thrust per motor	Maximum thrust per motor	Burn time (s)
Primary abort motor	1	Lower escape tower; four nozzles	730 kN (164,000 lbf)	≤ 876 kN (197,000 lbf)	3.05
Tower jettison motor	1	Middle escape tower; eight nozzles	250 kN (56,200 lbf)	≤ 312.5 kN (70,300 lbf)	0.596
Attitude control motor	4	Top of escape tower	16.25 kN (3,650 lbf)	≤ 21.9 kN (4,920 lbf)	0.8
High-altitude abort motor	4	Fairing	87.3 kN (19,600 lbf)	≤ 104.8 kN (23,600 lbf)	1.37
High-altitude jettison motor	2	Fairing	—	—	—

=== Comparison with Soyuz ===
Currently operational crewed spacecraft (at least orbital class)

Although the Shenzhou spacecraft follows the same layout as the Russian Soyuz spacecraft, it has an approximate launch mass of 8,000 kilograms (18,000 lb), compared with a launch mass of 7,290 kilograms (16,070 lb) for Soyuz MS, making it approximately 10% heavier. The reentry modules and orbital modules of Shenzhou are also larger and roomier with a total habitable volume of 14 m^{3} (490 cu ft), as opposed to 10 m^{3} (350 cu ft) for Soyuz MS. ESA astronaut Matthias Maurer has noted that Shenzhou’s additional space accommodates inflatable life rafts in case of an emergency splashdown, a feature absent from the Soyuz.

Shenzhou carries four engines for orbital maneuvers and deorbiting compared with the Soyuz’s single main engine. The Soyuz descent module also features a VSK-4 optical periscope that can be used in docking (and is jettisoned before reentry), while Shenzhou crew rely solely on cameras for images of the target spacecraft on electronic displays for the procedure. Shenzhou's solar array can supply over 1.8 kW of electricity, while Soyuz MS's generates 0.60 kW on average.

== Mission profile ==
=== Launch preparation ===
Rollout of Shenzhou 18

All Shenzhou spacecraft have launched from Launch Area 4 of the Jiuquan Satellite Launch Center aboard Long March 2F (Shenjian) rockets. The spacecraft and rocket are tested and inspected individually before undergoing vertical assembly and integrated checks. Several days before launch, the combined stack travels upright by rail to the launch site 1,500 metres (4,900 ft) away, a process that takes approximately two hours. Full-system rehearsals with crew members and ground teams follow with a full simulation of the launch process.

Propellant loading for the Long March 2F takes about six hours and is completed approximately a day before launch. Crew members are transported to the launch pad approximately three hours before launch and board Shenzhou through a hatch in the orbital module and lower themselves into the reentry module.

=== Launch ===
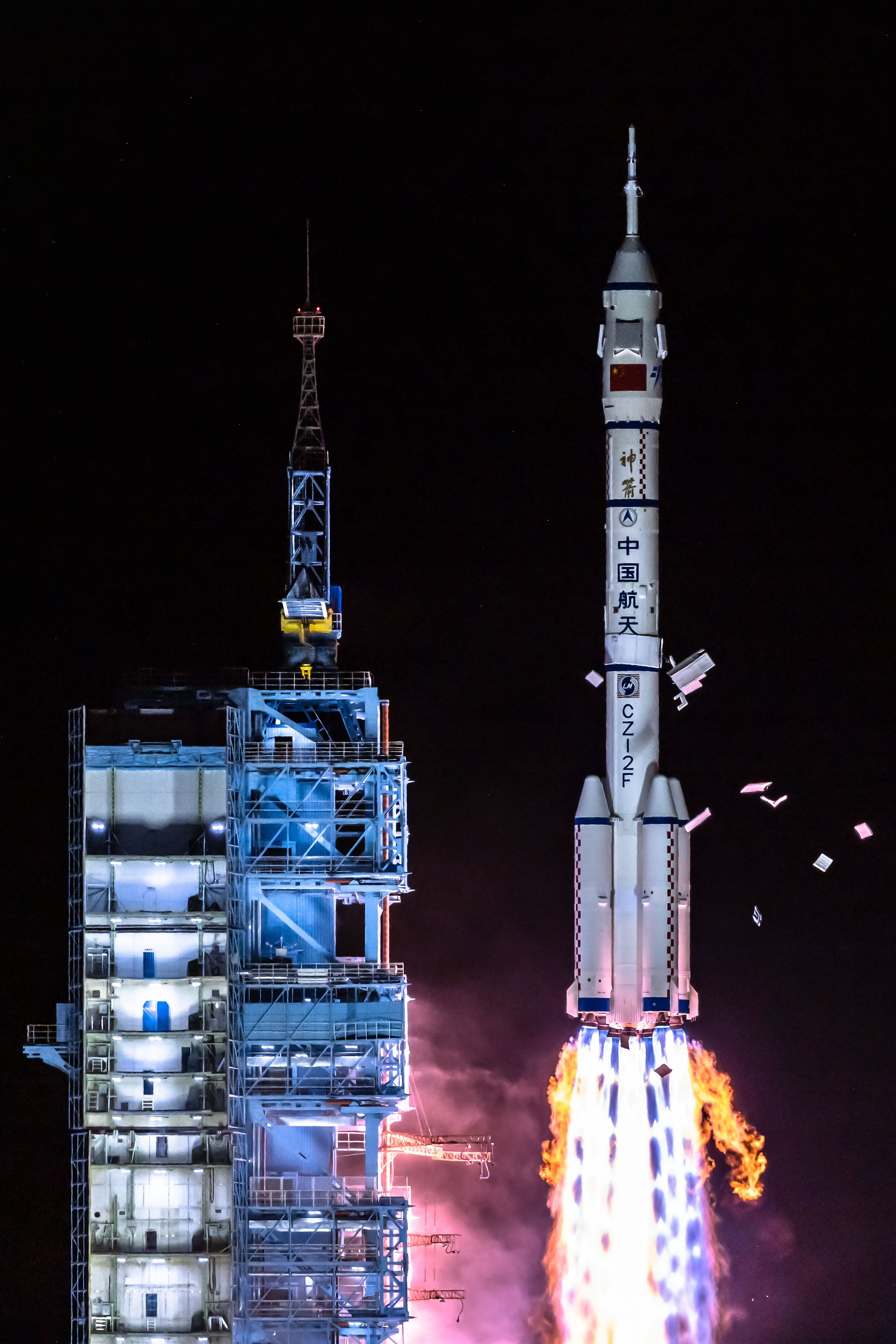
Launch of Shenzhou 13

Following ignition and liftoff, the rocket initially ascends vertically, beginning a programmed pitch maneuver at approximately T+12 seconds. The launch escape tower is jettisoned at approximately T+120 seconds at an altitude of about 40 kilometres (130,000 ft), and the four strap-on boosters separate at approximately T+152 seconds. Shortly after, stage separation of the first and second stage occurs. The payload fairing separates at T+205 seconds, and second stage main-engine cutoff occurs around T+460 seconds. The Shenzhou spacecraft separates from the second stage approximately two minutes later at T+580 seconds and deploys its solar panels. Shenzhou 12 through Shenzhou 20 used an autonomous rendezvous and docking sequence with Tiangong lasting approximately 6.5 hours. Shenzhou 21 introduced a faster profile, reducing the rendezvous and docking time to approximately 3.5 hours

=== In orbit ===
Missions since Shenzhou 12 have all docked at Tiangong. Current Shenzhou spacecraft can remain docked to the space station for approximately 270 days. While docked, Shenzhou serves as the crew's lifeboat if a serious station incident requires them to evacuate.

A backup Shenzhou and launch vehicle is always kept on standby on the ground and can be rapidly readied for an emergency launch.

=== Reentry and landing ===
Landing of Shenzhou 21

For missions to Tiangong, Shenzhou undocks and proceeds to maneuver away from the space station, pausing at designated hold points. Early missions to Tiangong took 11 orbits (about 16.5 hours) after undocking to return to Earth, but this was shortened in Shenzhou 13 to 5 orbits (7.5 hours) and in Shenzhou 21 to 3 orbits (4.5 hours). Fifty minutes before landing at an altitude of approximately 390 kilometres (240 mi), the spacecraft orients its attitude and the reentry module separates from the orbital module. Shenzhou then fires its main engines for 150 to 180 seconds for the deorbit burn and the reentry module separates from the service module at an altitude of 145 kilometres (476,000 ft). Upon reentry into the atmosphere, Shenzhou is traveling at about 7 km/s (4.3 mi/s) and the crew in the reentry module experience a communications blackout as the superheated ionized air around the spacecraft interferes with radio signals.

A three-stage parachute deployment sequence deploys at an altitude of 10 kilometres (33,000 ft) - the pilot, drogue, and main parachute. The main parachute decelerates the capsule to approximately 7 m/s (23.0 ft/s) and the heat shield is jettisoned at 6 kilometres (20,000 ft), exposing a gamma-ray altimeter and four solid-fuel braking rockets. The capsule then moves from single-point to two-point suspension underneath the parachute in order to align the capsule for touchdown. At about 1 metre (3.3 ft) above the ground, the rockets in the bottom of the capsule briefly fire to further slow the capsule to a final landing speed of 2 m/s (6.6 ft/s). The crew's seats are equipped with shock absorbers to cushion the impact with the ground.

Early Shenzhou missions landed in Dorbod Banner, Inner Mongolia. Beginning with Shenzhou 12 in 2021, the primary landing site shifted to the Dongfeng landing site in Ejin Banner, which lies within 100 kilometres (62 mi) of the launch site at Jiuquan. Recovery teams equipped with helicopters and ground vehicles are deployed ahead of landing and use BeiDou forecast models to move towards the spacecraft's projected landing site before touchdown.

== List of flights ==
List includes only completed or currently manifested missions. Dates are listed in UTC, and for future events, they are the earliest possible opportunities (also known as NET dates) and may change. Unless noted otherwise, information is from Gunter's Space Page.

Number	Launch	Landing	Crew	Destination	Flight duration	Orbits	Notes	Outcome
Shenzhou 1	19 November 1999, 22:30	20 November 1999, 19:41	—N/a	Low Earth orbit	21 hours, 11 minutes	14	Uncrewed orbital test flight.	Success
Shenzhou 2	9 January 2001, 17:00	16 January 2001, 11:22	—N/a	Low Earth orbit	6 days, 18 hours, 22 minutes	108	First complete prototype.	Partial failure (Note: A parachute failure resulted in a hard landing; see § Development.)
Shenzhou 3	25 March 2002, 14:15	1 April 2002, 08:51	—N/a	Low Earth orbit	6 days, 18 hours, 51 minutes	108	Carried an instrumented mannequin that simulated human metabolism to assess life-support systems.	Success
Shenzhou 4	29 December 2002, 16:40	5 January 2003, 11:16	—N/a	Low Earth orbit	6 days, 18 hours, 36 minutes	108	Full unmanned rehearsal of the first crewed flight.	Success
Shenzhou 5	15 October 2003, 01:00	15 October 2003, 22:22	Yang Liwei	Low Earth orbit	21 hours, 22 minutes,	14	First crewed orbital test flight.	Success
Shenzhou 6	12 October 2005, 01:00	16 October 2005, 20:33	Fei Junlong; Nie Haisheng	Low Earth orbit	4 days, 19 hours, 33 minutes	77	First two-person crew and use of the orbital module.	Success
Shenzhou 7	25 September 2008, 13:10	28 September 2008, 09:37	Zhai Zhigang; Liu Boming; Jing Haipeng	Low Earth orbit	2 days, 20 hours, 27 minutes	45	First three-person crew and EVA of the Chinese space program.	Success
Shenzhou 8	31 October 2011, 21:58	17 November 2011, 11:32	—N/a	Tiangong-1	17 days, 13 hours, 34 minutes	249	Uncrewed orbital test flight. First orbital rendezvous and docking.	Success
Shenzhou 9	16 June 2012, 10:37	29 June 2012, 02:01	Jing Haipeng; Liu Wang; Liu Yang	Tiangong-1	12 days, 15 hours, 24 minutes	198	First crewed docking mission. Carried Liu Yang, the first Chinese woman in space.	Success
Shenzhou 10	11 June 2013, 09:38	26 June 2013, 00:07	Nie Haisheng; Zhang Xiaoguang; Wang Yaping	Tiangong-1	14 days, 14 hours, 29 minutes	229	Final mission to Tiangong-1.	Success
Shenzhou 11	16 October 2016, 23:30	18 November 2016, 05:59	Jing Haipeng; Chen Dong	Tiangong-2	32 days, 6 hours, 29 minutes	507	Sole mission to Tiangong-2.	Success
Shenzhou 12	17 June 2021, 01:22	17 September 2021, 05:34	Nie Haisheng; Liu Boming; Tang Hongbo	Tiangong	92 days, 4 hours, 11 minutes	1,454	First resident crew to Tiangong.	Success
Shenzhou 13	15 October 2021, 16:23	16 April 2022, 01:56	Zhai Zhigang; Wang Yaping; Ye Guangfu	Tiangong	182 days, 9 hours, 32 minutes	2,885	First six-month crewed mission.	Success
Shenzhou 14	5 June 2022, 02:44	4 December 2022, 12:09	Chen Dong; Liu Yang; Cai Xuzhe	Tiangong	182 days, 9 hours, 25 minutes	2,885	Expansion of Tiangong occurred during this mission.	Success
Shenzhou 15	29 November 2022, 15:08	3 June 2023, 22:33	Fei Junlong; Deng Qingming; Zhang Lu	Tiangong	186 days, 7 hours, 25 minutes	2,931		Success
Shenzhou 16	30 May 2023, 09:31	31 October 2023, 00:12	Jing Haipeng; Zhu Yangzhu; Gui Haichao	Tiangong	153 days, 22 hours, 41 minutes	2,429	Carried Gui Haichao, first civilian to fly on Shenzhou.	Success
Shenzhou 17	26 October 2023, 03:14	30 April 2024, 09:46	Tang Hongbo; Tang Shengjie; Jiang Xinlin	Tiangong	187 days, 6 hours, 32 minutes	2,943		Success
Shenzhou 18	25 April 2024, 12:59	3 November 2024, 17:24	Ye Guangfu; Li Cong; Li Guangsu	Tiangong	192 days, 4 hours, 25 minutes	3,041		Success
Shenzhou 19	29 October 2024, 20:27	29 April 2025, 05:09	Cai Xuzhe; Song Lingdong; Wang Haoze	Tiangong	182 days, 8 hours, 42 minutes	2,886		Success
Shenzhou 20	24 April 2025, 9:17	19 January 2026, 01:34	Launch: Chen Dong; Chen Zhongrui; Wang Jie Landing: Uncrewed	Tiangong	269 days, 16 hours, 16 minutes		Window damage caused by a suspected space-debris impact prevented a crewed return; returned uncrewed.	Partial failure (Note: The Shenzhou 20 capsule was damaged by a space debris impact while docked at the Tiangong Space Station. It returned to Earth uncrewed, and the crew returned in the Shenzhou 21 capsule.)
Shenzhou 21	31 October 2025, 15:44	14 November 2025, 08:30	Launch: Zhang Lu; Zhang Hongzhang; Wu Fei Landing: Chen Dong; Chen Zhongrui; Wang Jie	Tiangong	13 days, 16 hours, 55 minutes		Returned the Shenzhou 20 crew.	Success
Shenzhou 22	25 November 2025, 04:11	29 May 2026, 12:11	Launch: Uncrewed Landing: Zhang Lu; Zhang Hongzhang; Wu Fei	Tiangong	185 days, 7 hours, 59 minutes		Launched uncrewed as an emergency launch.	Success
Shenzhou 23	24 May 2026, 15:08	30 November 2026 (planned)	Launch: Zhu Yangzhu; Zhang Zhiyuan; Lai Ka-ying	Tiangong	Ongoing		Carried Lai Ka-ying, first crew member from Hong Kong.	
Shenzhou 24	25 November 2026 (planned)		To be announced	Tiangong (planned)			Planned to bring a Pakistani astronaut to Tiangong; first flight of a foreign astronaut.	

== Current location of hardware ==
Only a subset of returned Shenzhou reentry modules have been placed on long-term or permanent display. Others have been occasionally exhibited across mainland China, Hong Kong, and Macau.

- Shenzhou 1: China Science and Technology Museum, Beijing.
- Shenzhou 2 and Shenzhou 3: Reportedly retained by CNSA for scientific experiments.
- Shenzhou 4: China Aerospace Museum, Beijing.
- Shenzhou 5: National Museum of China, Beijing.
- Shenzhou 6: Space Culture Park, Xiamen Wuyuan Experimental School, Xiamen, Fujian.
- Shenzhou 10: Mao Zedong Memorial Museum, Shaoshan, Hunan (long-term loan).
- Shenzhou 17: Museum of the Communist Party of China, Beijing.
- Shenzhou 18: Kashgar, Xinjiang (long-term loan for planned display at the Southern Xinjiang Science and Culture Complex).
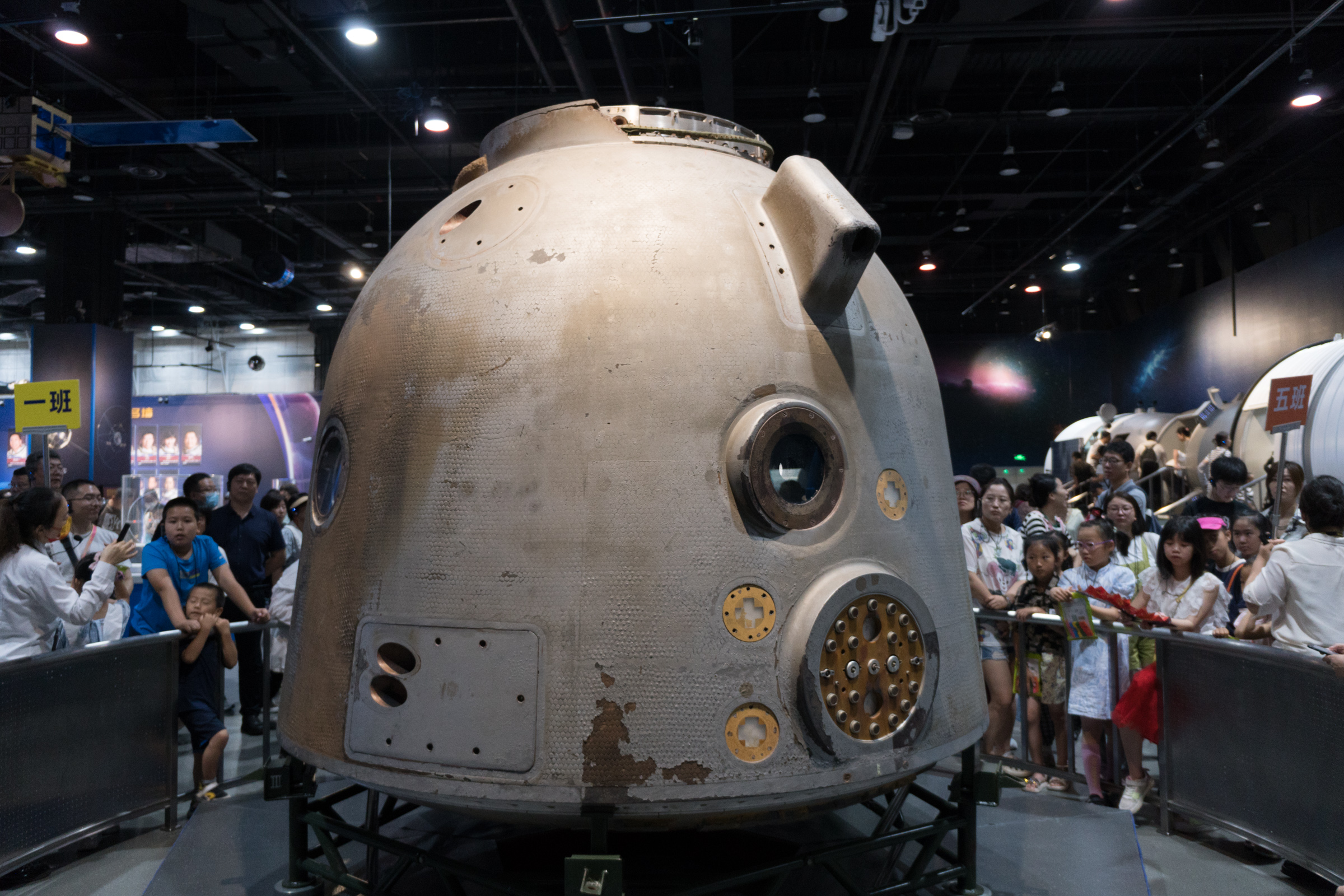
Shenzhou 1 at the China Science and Technology Museum, Beijing, in 2023

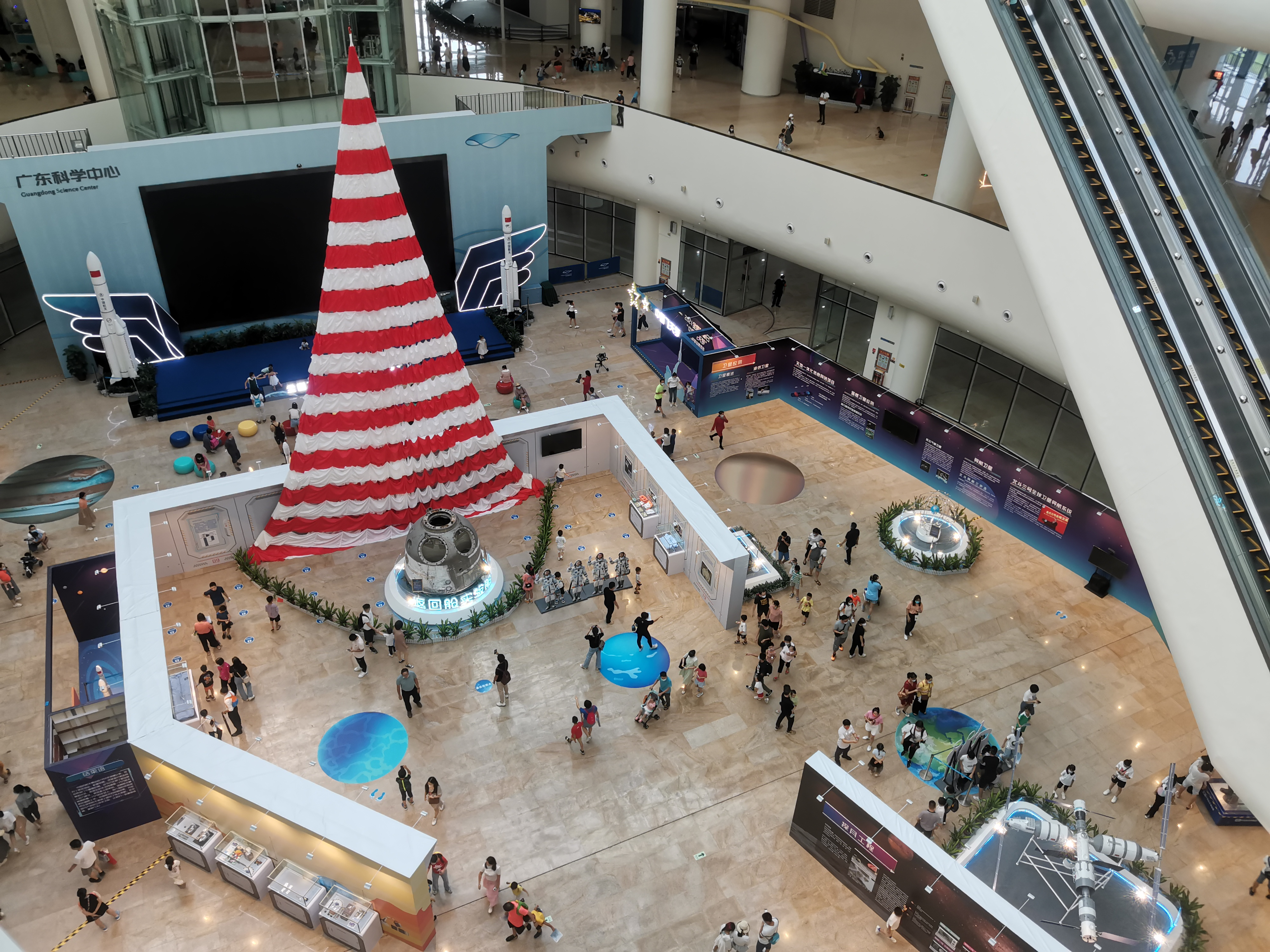
Shenzhou 4 and its parachute on loan to the Guangdong Science Center, Guangzhou, in 2021

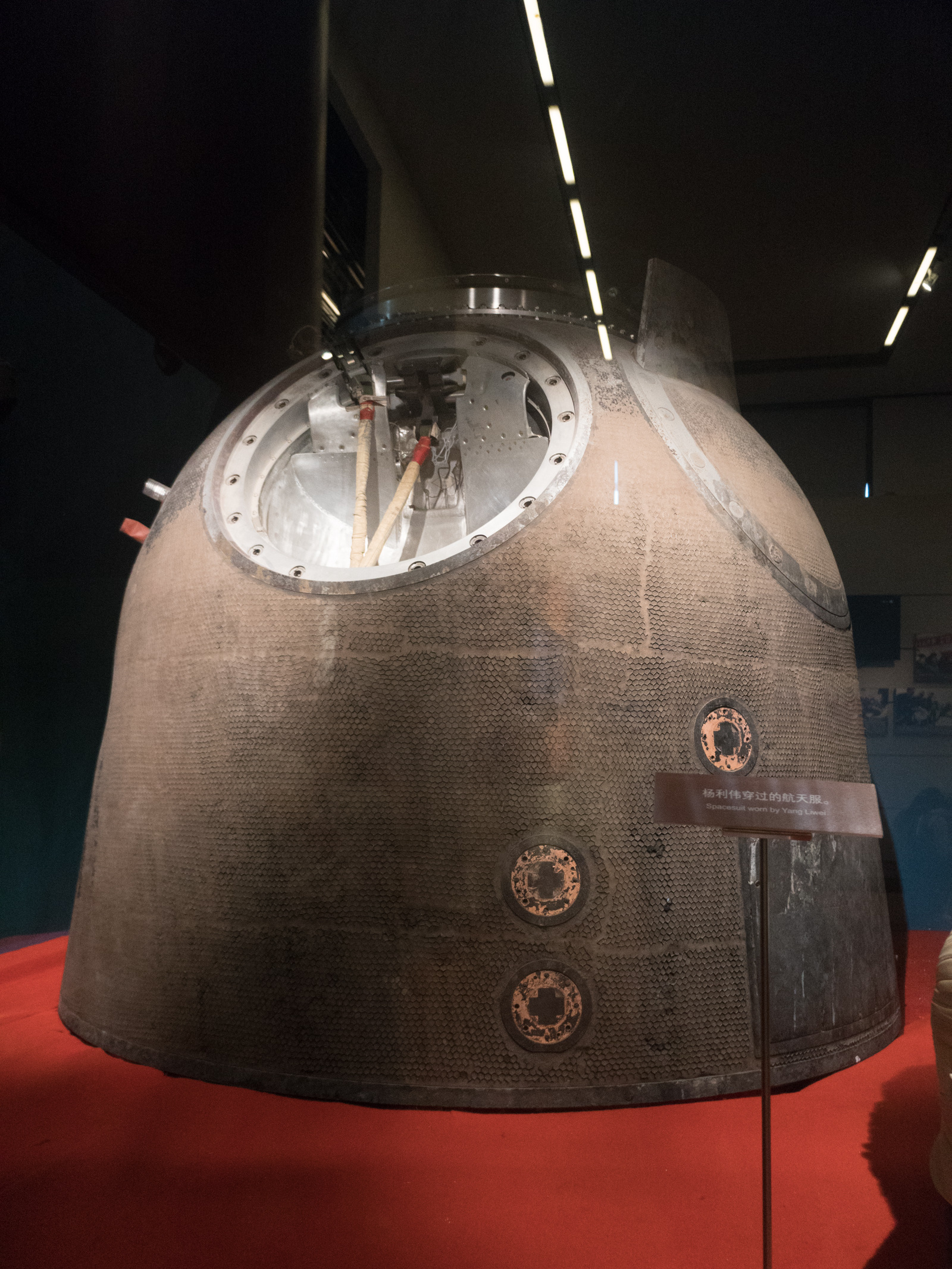
Shenzhou 5 at the National Museum of China, Beijing, in 2023

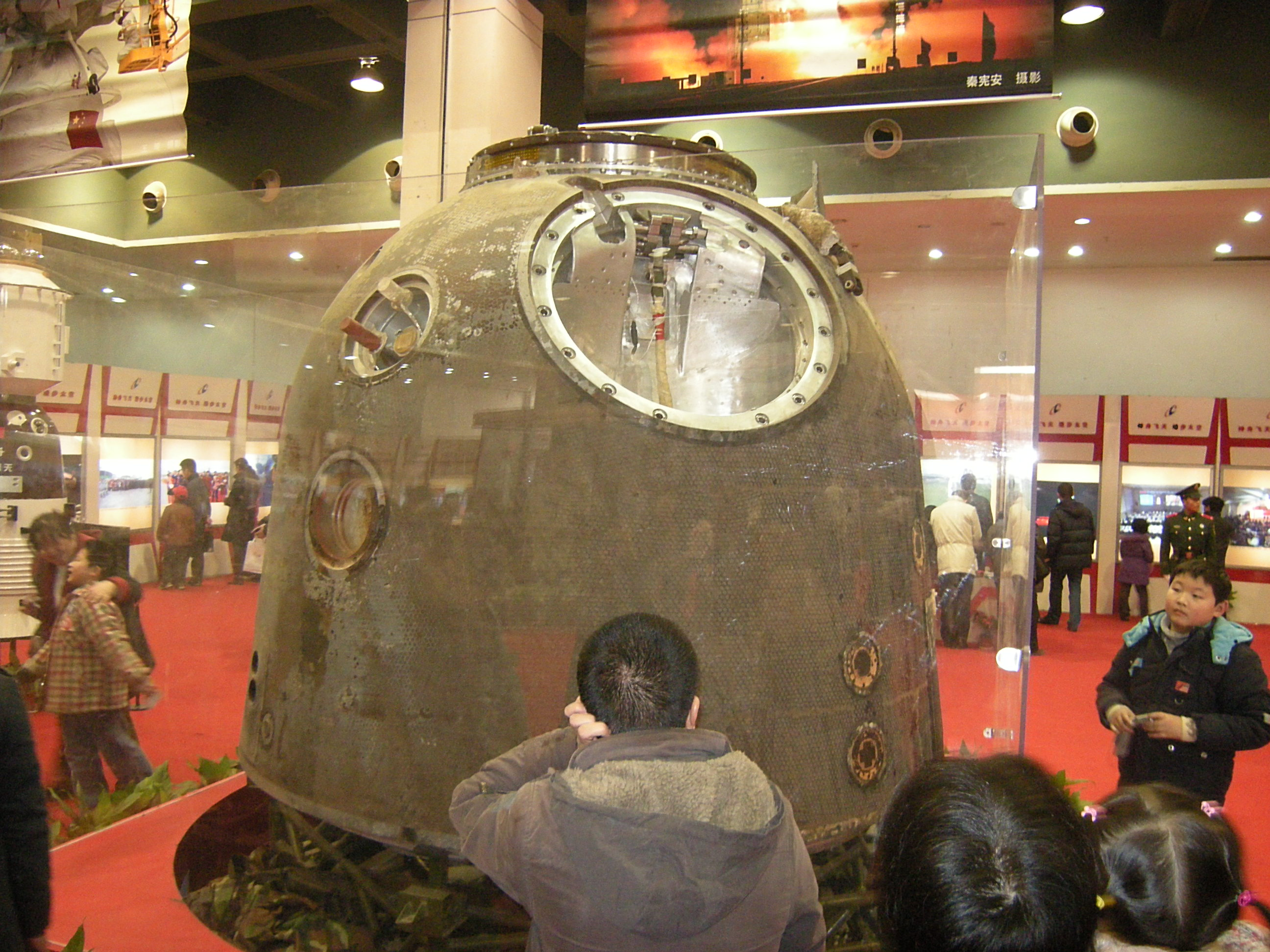
Shenzhou 7 at a temporary spaceflight exhibition in Hangzhou in 2010

Shenzhou 10 at the Mao Zedong Memorial Museum, Shaoshan, in 2026

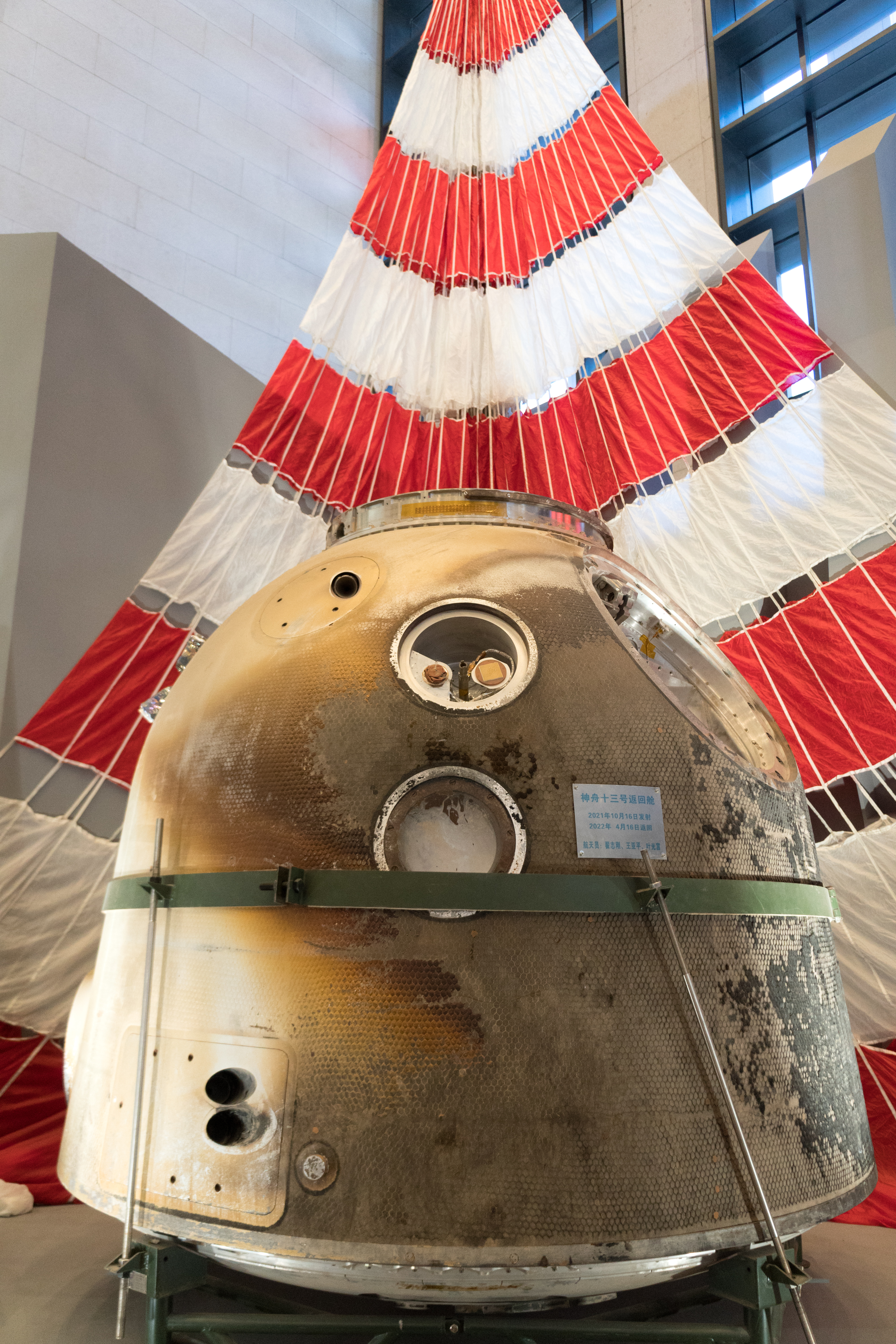
Shenzhou 13 and its parachute at a temporary exhibition at the National Museum of China, Beijing, in 2023

== In popular culture ==
- A Shenzhou spacecraft was prominently featured in the film Gravity and was used by the main character, STS-157 Mission Specialist Dr. Ryan Stone, to safely return home after the destruction of her spacecraft.
- In Star Trek: Discovery, the Walker-class starship USS Shenzhou is named after this spacecraft.
- Footage from Shenzhou 13 was incorporated into the documentary film Shenzhou 13 (Chinese: 窗外是蓝星; lit. 'Blue Planet Outside the Window'), directed by Zhu Yiran and produced by China Media Group, which was subsequently released in Chinese cinemas on 5 September 2025.

== See also ==
- 863 Program
- China Manned Space Program
- List of human spaceflights to the Tiangong space station
- Long March (rocket family)
- Mengzhou
- Shuguang
- Soyuz
- Tiangong program
