= Chinese Docking Mechanism =

Spacecraft docking mechanism

The Chinese Docking Mechanism is a spacecraft docking system developed for China's human spaceflight programme, based on the Androgynous Peripheral Attach System (APAS). It is used by Shenzhou spacecraft to dock with the Tiangong space laboratories and space station, beginning with the uncrewed Shenzhou 8 mission in 2011. A similar mechanism was introduced for the Tianzhou cargo spacecraft, with Tianzhou 1 becoming the first cargo spacecraft to dock with Tiangong-2. The system features an 800 mm diameter transfer passage and has androgynous and non-androgynous variants. According to a Chinese national standard published in 2017, it conforms to the International Docking System Standard.

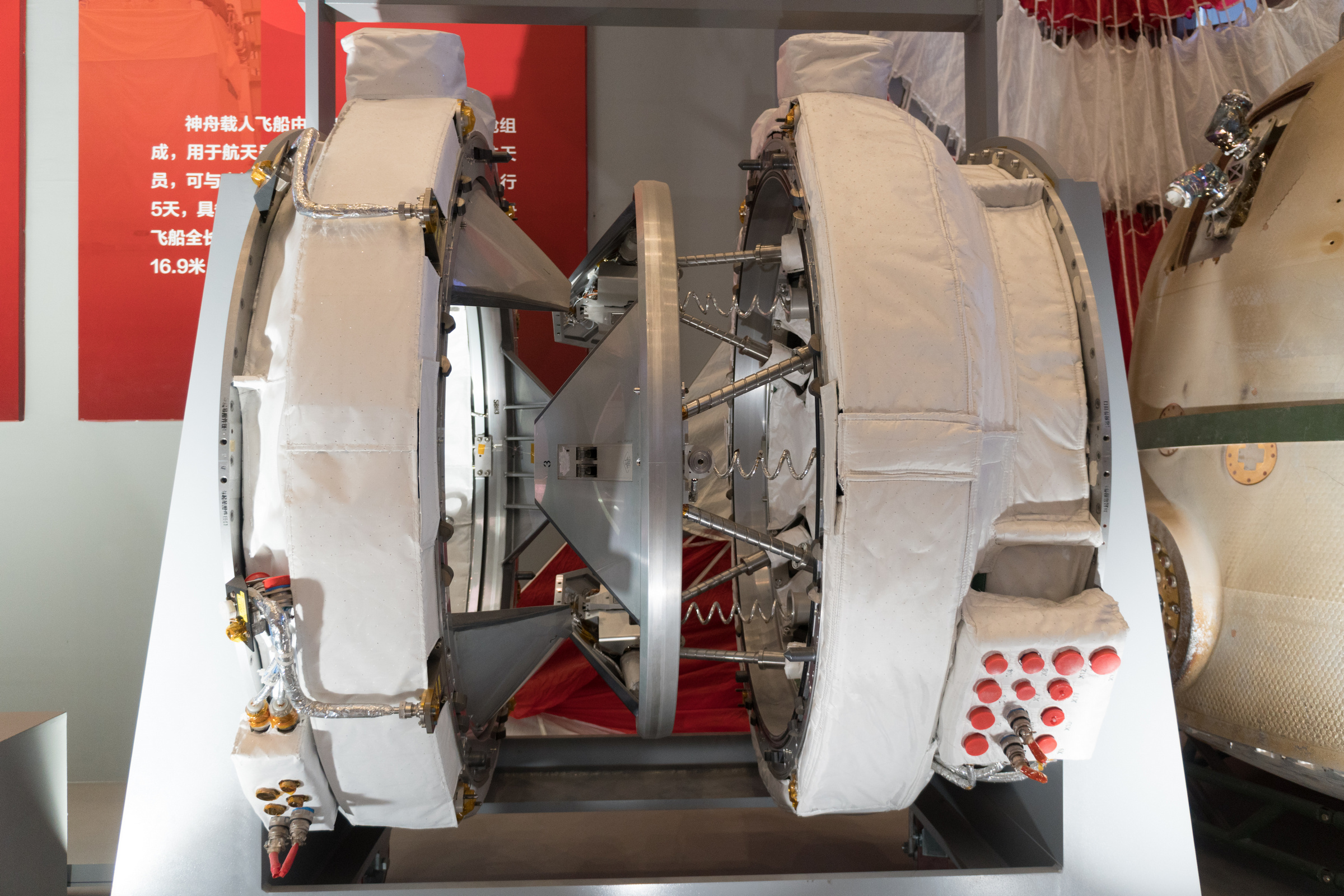
Non-androgynous docking device used by China Manned Space Program displayed at National Museum of China, with the right side acts assuming the "active" role.

== Description ==
The Chinese Docking Mechanism is a spacecraft docking mechanism based on the Androgynous Peripheral Attach System (APAS). There have been contradicting reports by the Chinese on its compatibility with APAS. It is used by Shenzhou spacecraft, beginning with an uncrewed Shenzhou 8, to dock to Tiangong-1. Subsequent crewed missions docked with the Tiangong-1, Tiangong-2 and the Tiangong space station. Similar docking mechanism was also introduced to the Tianzhou cargo spacecraft. Tianzhou 1 was the first cargo spacecraft which docked with the Tiangong-2. It has a circular transfer passage that has a diameter of 800 mm (31 in). The androgynous variant has a mass of 310 kg and the non-androgynous variant has a mass of 200 kg. The system conforms to International Docking System Standard(IDSS), according to a National Standards of China published in 2017, GB/T 34512-2017 "Requirement for interface of manned spacecraft peripheral docking mechanism".

== Development ==
The docking mechanism was developed by Institute 805 of the Shanghai Academy of Spaceflight Technology, also known as the Shanghai Institute of Space Systems Engineering. In September 2011 the academy's president, Zhu Zhisong, said that the mechanism fitted to Tiangong-1 was compatible with the international standard. Nine sets of the mechanism were manufactured during development. The system is androgynous, so either vehicle can be the active or passive partner, and Shenzhou 8 was the active vehicle in the first docking. A ring deployed in front of the active spacecraft's nose makes first contact, and then a robotic system brings the vehicles together and drives latches to form a firm connection.

Capture takes place in two stages: a Soft Capture System first stabilises the active part of the mechanism against the passive interface, and a Hard Capture System then completes the structural connection. The mechanism includes 12 latches for airtight sealing and four springs for separation. In China's first docking, at 1728 GMT on 2 November 2011, the docking ring retracted after first contact and 12 locking pins drove to form the attachment. The docking ring made contact at a speed of 0.2 metres per second. Shenzhou 8 later undocked and redocked with Tiangong-1 in a sequence lasting about 30 minutes, to test the reusability of the system.

== See also ==
- Docking and berthing of spacecraft
- International Docking System Standard
