= Shenzhou 2 =

2001 Chinese uncrewed spaceflight

- Mission type: Uncrewed test flight
- Operator: China Manned Space Agency
- COSPAR ID: 2001-001A
- SATCAT no.: 26664
- Mission duration: 6 days, 18 hours, 21 minutes
- Orbits completed: 117

Spacecraft properties
- Spacecraft type: Shenzhou
- Manufacturer: China Aerospace Science and Technology Corporation
- Launch mass: 7,400 kg (16,300 lb)

Start of mission
- Launch date: 9 January 2001, 17:00:03 UTC
- Rocket: Long March 2F (Y2)
- Launch site: Jiuquan, LA-4/SLS-1
- Contractor: China Academy of Launch Vehicle Technology

End of mission
- Landing date: 16 January 2001
- Landing site: Dorbod Banner

Orbital parameters
- Reference system: Geocentric orbit
- Regime: Low Earth orbit
- Eccentricity: 0.00119
- Perigee altitude: 330 km (210 mi)
- Apogee altitude: 346 km (215 mi)
- Inclination: 42.6°
- Period: 91.3 minutes
- Epoch: 8 January 2001, 20:00:00 UTC

Shenzhou 2 (simplified Chinese: 神舟二号; traditional Chinese: 神舟二號; pinyin: Shénzhōu èr hào) launched on 9 January 2001, was the second unmanned launch of the Shenzhou spacecraft. Inside the reentry capsule were a monkey, a dog and a rabbit in a test of the spaceship's life support systems. The reentry module separated from the rest of the spacecraft after just over seven days in orbit, with the orbital module staying in orbit for another 220 days.

Shenzhou 2 tested the spacecraft much more rigorously than its predecessor Shenzhou 1. After being launched into a 196.5 by 333.8 km orbit, 20.5 hours after launch it circularised its orbit to 327.7 by 332.7 km. Around 1220 UTC on 12 January it once again changed its orbit to 329.3 by 339.4 km. A third orbit change came on 15 January, 328.7 by 345.4 km.

As well as the animal cargo, there were 64 different scientific payloads. 15 were carried in the reentry module, 12 in the orbital module and 37 on the forward external pallet. These included a microgravity crystallography experiment; animal species including six mice, and small aquatic and terrestrial organisms; cosmic ray and particle detectors and a gamma ray burst detectors. To test the radio transmitting systems taped messages were broadcast from the spacecraft.

== Successful reentry and failed landing ==
The signal for retrofire was sent at about 1015 UTC on 16 January as the spacecraft passed over the South Atlantic Ocean off the coast of South Africa. It landed in Inner Mongolia at 11:22 UTC. No photos were released of the landing capsule leading to some speculation that the reentry was not completely successful, though Chinese officials kept silent, only responded anomaly. The Swedish Space Center news site reported that an unnamed source said one of the connections from the capsule to the single parachute failed leading to a hard landing. Later in 2017, it was revealed by Yang Liwei that the parachutes failed to open upon re-entry, which resulted in a hard-landing. Some of the cargo was slightly burned.

The mission of the orbital module continued until it was commanded to fire its rockets to initiate reentry on 24 August. It reentered over the western Pacific Ocean between Easter Island and Chile.

== See also ==
- Chinese space program
- Tiangong program
- Shenzhou spacecraft
- Long March rocket
- Jiuquan Satellite Launch Center
- Animals in space
