= Shenzhou 8 =

2011 Chinese uncrewed spaceflight to Tiangong-1

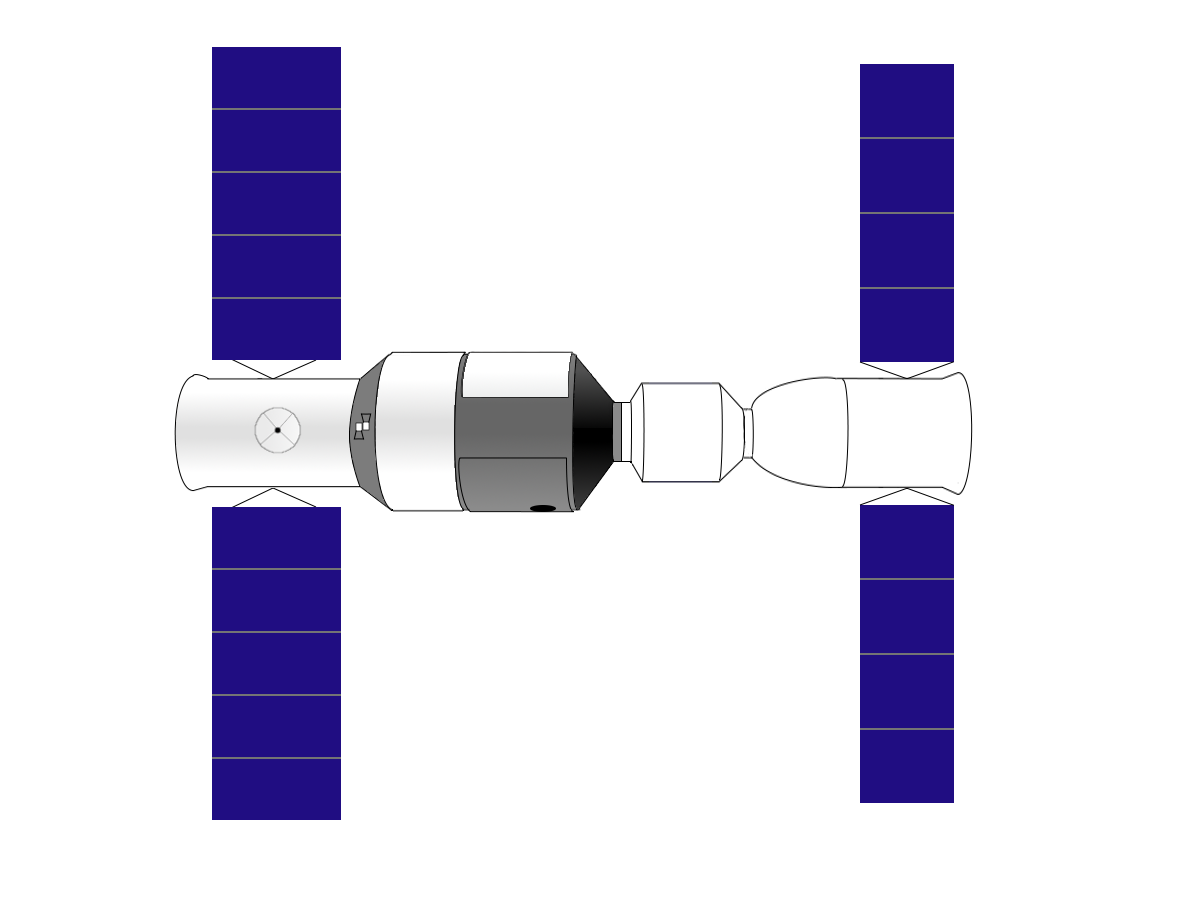
- Diagram of Shenzhou 8 (right) docked with Tiangong-1 (left)
- Mission type: Uncrewed test flight
- Operator: China Manned Space Agency
- COSPAR ID: 2011-063A
- SATCAT no.: 37859
- Mission duration: 16 days, 13 hours, 33 minutes
- Orbits completed: 249

Spacecraft properties
- Spacecraft type: Shenzhou
- Manufacturer: China Aerospace Science and Technology Corporation

Start of mission
- Launch date: 31 October 2011, 21:58:10 UTC
- Rocket: Long March 2F/G (Y8)
- Launch site: Jiuquan, LA-4/SLS-1
- Contractor: China Academy of Launch Vehicle Technology

End of mission
- Landing date: 17 November 2011, 11:32 UTC
- Landing site: Siziwang Banner, Inner Mongolia (42.239°N 111.298°E)

Orbital parameters
- Reference system: Geocentric orbit
- Regime: Low Earth orbit
- Perigee altitude: 330 km (210 mi)
- Apogee altitude: 343 km (213 mi)
- Inclination: 51.37°

Docking with Tiangong-1
- Docking date: 2 November 2011, 17:30 UTC
- Undocking date: 14 November 2011, 11:27 UTC
- Time docked: 11 days, 17 hours, 57 minutes

Docking with Tiangong-1
- Docking date: 14 November 2011, 11:53 UTC
- Undocking date: 16 November 2011, 10:30 UTC
- Time docked: 1 day, 22 hours, 37 minutes

Shenzhou 8
- Chinese: 神舟八号
Transcriptions
Standard Mandarin
- Hanyu Pinyin: Shénzhōu Bāhào
- Gwoyeu Romatzyh: Shernjou bahaw
- Wade–Giles: Shenchao pahao
- IPA: [ʂə̌nʈʂóʊ páxâʊ]
Yue: Cantonese
- Yale Romanization: Shenjou bahau
- Jyutping: San4zau1 baat3hou6
- IPA: [sɐ̏ntsɐ̄u pāːthɐ̀u]

Shenzhou 8 (simplified Chinese: 神舟八号; traditional Chinese: 神舟八號; pinyin: Shénzhōu bā hào) was an uncrewed flight of China's Shenzhou program, launched on 31 October 2011 UTC, or 1 November 2011 in China, by a Long March 2F/G rocket, an improved version of the 2F making its maiden flight, which lifted off from the Jiuquan Satellite Launch Center.

The Shenzhou 8 spacecraft was automatically docked with the Tiangong-1 space module (launched on 29 September 2011) on 3 November 2011 and again on 14 November 2011. This uncrewed docking – China's first – was followed in 2012 with the crewed Shenzhou 9 mission, which performed a crewed docking (also China's first) with the Tiangong-1 module. Only the Soviet Union (Russia), Japan and the European Space Agency (ESA) had achieved automatic rendezvous and docking prior to China's accomplishment.

== History ==
On 29 September 2008, Zhang Jianqi (张建启), vice director of China crewed space engineering, announced in an interview of China Central Television (CCTV) that Tiangong-1, an 8-ton "target vehicle", would be launched in 2010 (now 2011), and that Shenzhou 8, Shenzhou 9 and Shenzhou 10 were all intended to dock with it. On 1 October 2008, Shanghai Space Administration, which participated in the development of Shenzhou 8, stated that they have succeeded in the simulated experiments for the docking of Tiangong-1 and Shenzhou 8.

In February 2009, the launch of Shenzhou 8 was planned for early 2011. By March 2011, the launch had been postponed until in October 2011.

Shenzhou 8 was launched at 21:58 UTC on 31 October 2011 (UTC) (1 November in China) by a Long March 2F rocket. The launch lifted off from 921/SLS-1 Launch Pad at the Southern Launch Site of the Jiuquan Satellite Launch Center. The uncrewed Shenzhou 8 mission successfully docked with Tiangong-1 on 2 November 2011 (UTC), marking China's first orbital docking. Shenzhou 8 undocked from Tiangong-1 on 14 November 2011, before successfully completing a second rendezvous and docking, so as to test the reusability of the docking system. Shenzhou 8 deorbited on 17 November 2011, and landed safely in Siziwang Banner in Inner Mongolia.

== Mission ==
Shenzhou 8 features an active APAS-like docking module in place of the usual orbital module, and performed its docking operation automatically under ground control. Docking took place on 2 November 2011 at 17:28 UTC, during orbital darkness to avoid interference from the Sun's glare with sensitive navigation and rendezvous equipment. After 12 days being docked, Shenzhou 8 undocked and a second docking took place, this time in full sunlight. The separation, second rendezvous, and docking occurred on 14 November 2011 and was aimed to test accuracy and reliability of equipment and sensors in a bright environment. On 17 November 2011, the capsule was autonomously de-orbited.

The mission also featured a biological sample supplied by Germany and the European Space Agency (ESA), which was cited as an example of "international cooperation in the field of manned space" by Zhang Jianqi, deputy chief commander of the China Manned Space Program.

== Spacecraft design ==
According to Zhang Bainan, the chief designer of China's spacecraft systems, Shenzhou 8 was the last to see significant modifications from previous models. Future flights will use the same spacecraft design, which is intended for production of multiple units of the same design.

== See also ==
- Chinese space program
- Tiangong program
- Jiuquan Satellite Launch Center
- Long March 2F
