= Shenzhou 1 =

1999 Chinese uncrewed spaceflight

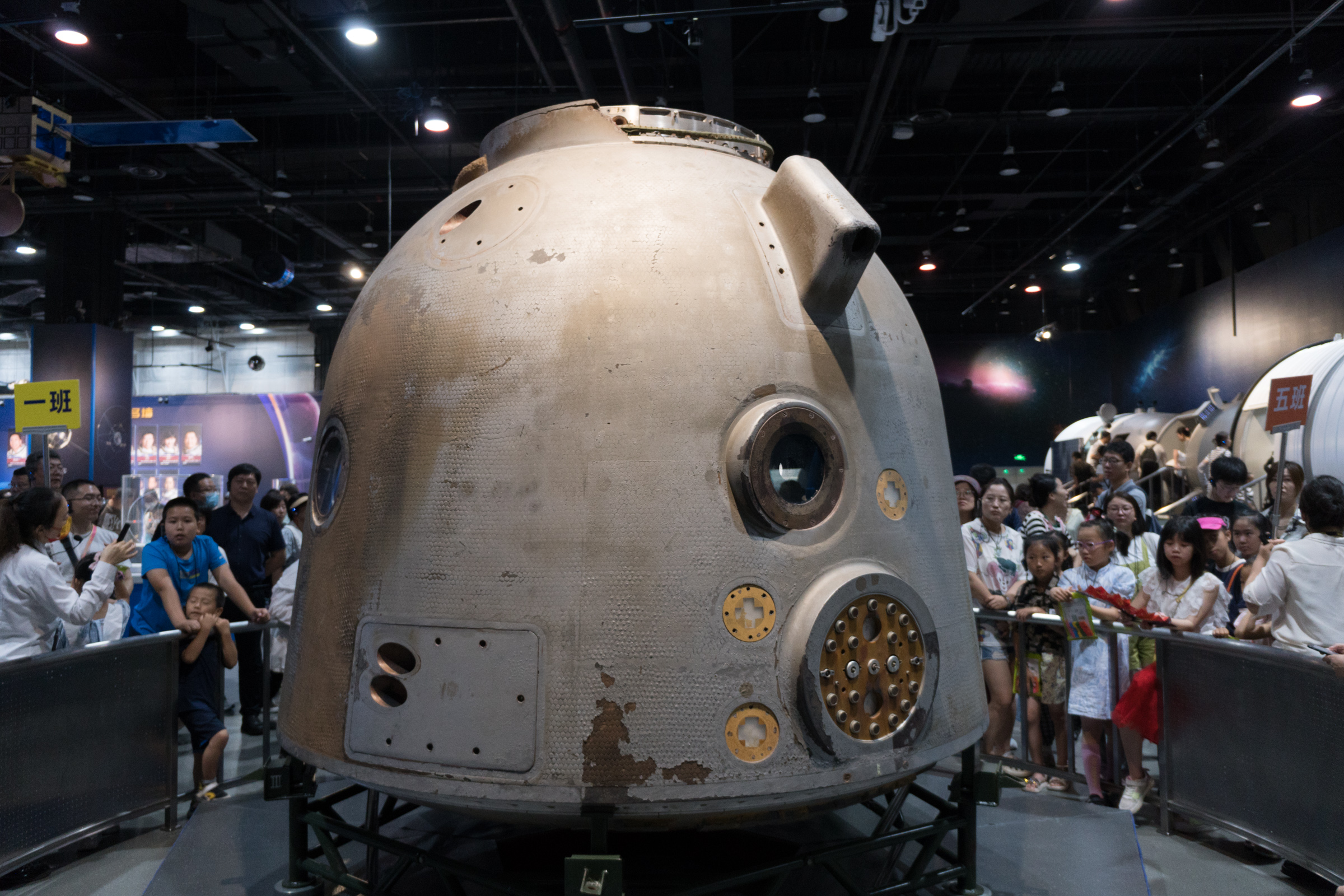
- Return capsule of Shenzhou 1 displayed at China Science and Technology Museum
- Mission type: Uncrewed test flight
- Operator: China Manned Space Agency
- COSPAR ID: 1999-061A
- SATCAT no.: 25956
- Mission duration: 21 hours, 11 minutes
- Orbits completed: 14

Spacecraft properties
- Spacecraft type: Shenzhou
- Manufacturer: China Aerospace Science and Technology Corporation
- Launch mass: 7,600 kg (16,800 lb)

Start of mission
- Launch date: 19 November 1999, 22:30 UTC
- Rocket: Long March 2F (Y1)
- Launch site: Jiuquan, LA-4/SLS-1
- Contractor: China Academy of Launch Vehicle Technology

End of mission
- Landing date: 20 November 1999, 19:41 UTC
- Landing site: Dorbod Banner (41°N 105°E)

Orbital parameters
- Reference system: Geocentric orbit
- Regime: Low Earth orbit
- Perigee altitude: 195 km (121 mi)
- Apogee altitude: 315 km (196 mi)
- Inclination: 42.6°
- Period: 89.6 minutes

Shenzhou 1 (simplified Chinese: 神舟一号; traditional Chinese: 神舟一號; pinyin: Shénzhōu yī hào) was the first uncrewed test flight of the Shenzhou spacecraft and the Long March 2F rocket, launched on 19 November 1999. The spacecraft lacked a life-support system but included an emergency escape system. After 14 orbits, the command to begin reentry was sent by the Yuan Wang 3 off the coast of Namibia at 18:49 UTC. The capsule landed successfully in the Dorbod Banner landing area, about 415 kilometres (258 mi) east of the launch site and 110 kilometres (68 mi) north-west of Wuhai, Inner Mongolia.

== History ==
To meet China's goal of flying the mission before the end of 1999, a spacecraft originally built for on-ground electrical tests was used instead of the final flight model. As a result, Shenzhou 1 differed from later vehicles: it carried fixed solar cells rather than unfolding panels, only 8 of its 13 subsystems were active, and it conducted no orbit-changing maneuvers after separation. Its spacecraft objectives focused on basic functions such as module separation, attitude control, lifting-body reentry, evaluation of the heat shield, and ground recovery, while the primary mission goal was to verify the performance of the Long March 2F.

The spacecraft is believed to have carried 100 kilograms (220 lb) of seeds for exposure to the space environment. The orbital module reportedly carried a dummy ELINT payload, with operational packages introduced from Shenzhou 2 onward.

In June 1999, officials announced that the flight would occur in October, and images of the Long March 2F launcher and associated facilities appeared on a Chinese military forum around the same time. Following a reported propellant explosion at the Jiuquan Satellite Launch Center—an incident denied by Chinese authorities—the launch was delayed to November.

Despite its limited test objectives, Shenzhou 1 was regarded as a successful debut flight for both the spacecraft and the Long March 2F.

== See also ==
- Chinese space program
- China Manned Space Program
