= China Science and Technology Museum =

Science museum in Beijing

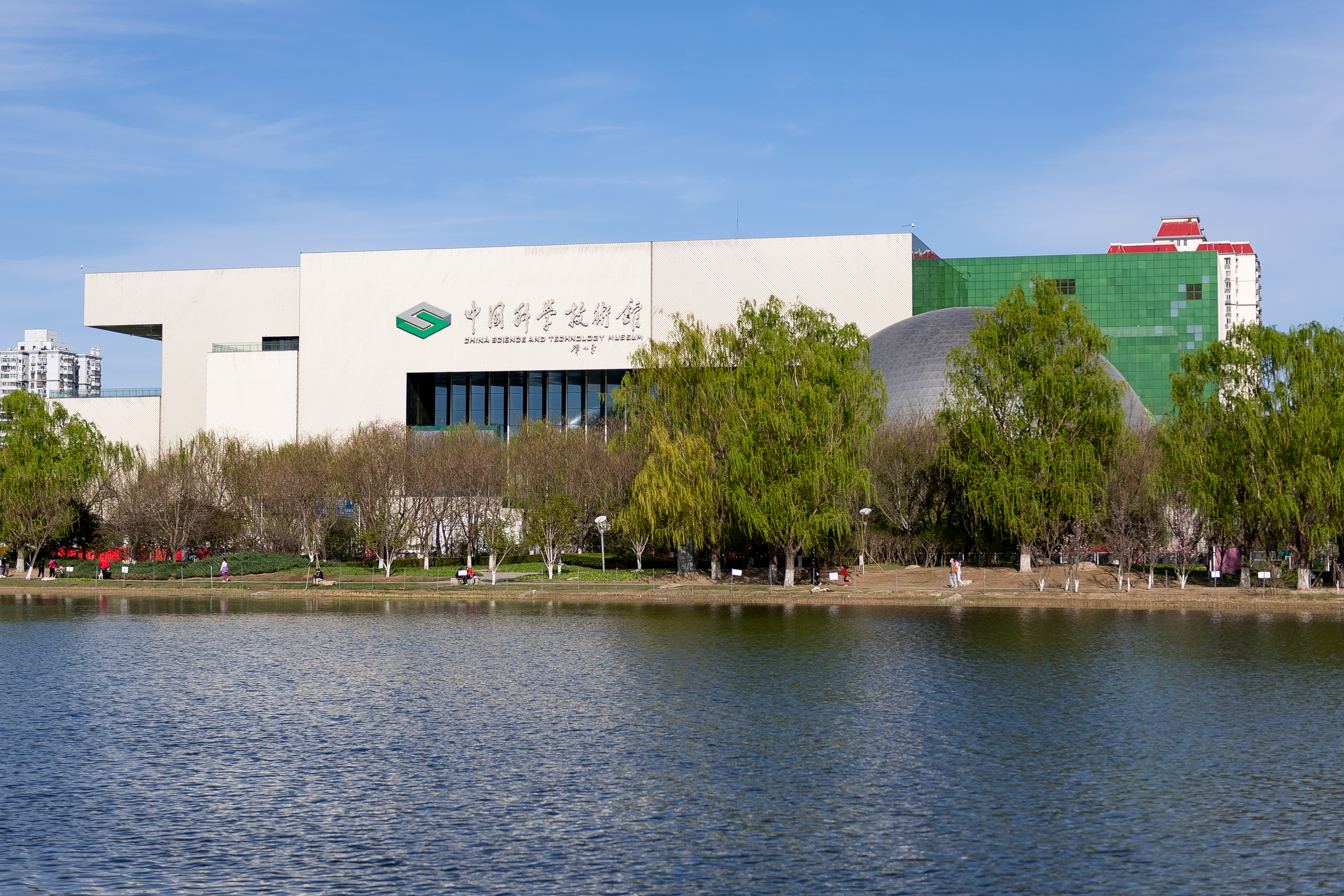
- The China Science and Technology Museum in April 2021
- Established: 1988
- Location: Beijing, China
- Coordinates: 40°00′17″N 116°23′32″E
- Type: Science museum
- Website: cstm.cdstm.cn

The China Science and Technology Museum (Chinese: 中国科学技术馆) is a national-level science and technology museum located in Chaoyang, Beijing, China. Established in 1988, it is affiliated with the China Association for Science and Technology.

The museum is "the only comprehensive museum of science and technology at national level in China," according to the official website of the Beijing government.

== Museum history ==
According to China Internet Information Center, the museum was founded in 1988 and expanded in 2000 at a location on the northern section of Beijing's 3rd Ring Road. Its activities included "popular science exhibitions, Astro-vision film shows, training-based education programs and experiment-based exhibition programs."

In preparation for Beijing's 2008 Summer Olympics, construction of new buildings for the museum began at the Olympic site in 2006. The new museum opened in September, 2009, having been expanded from its previous 40,000 square meters to 48,000 square meters. The previous museum site was closed for several years before undergoing renovation and expansion beginning in 2016. On 15 September 2018, the old science museum reopened as Beijing Science Center.

== Museum at Olympic site ==
The museum at its current site houses both permanent and temporary exhibitions. It has many facilities for science popularization (classrooms, laboratories, lecture halls, etc.) including four special-effect theaters.

== Transportation ==
The museum is located in the Beijing Olympic Village, near the Olympic Green station of the Beijing Subway.

== See also ==
- List of museums in China
