= Shenzhou 5 =

2003 first human spaceflight mission of China

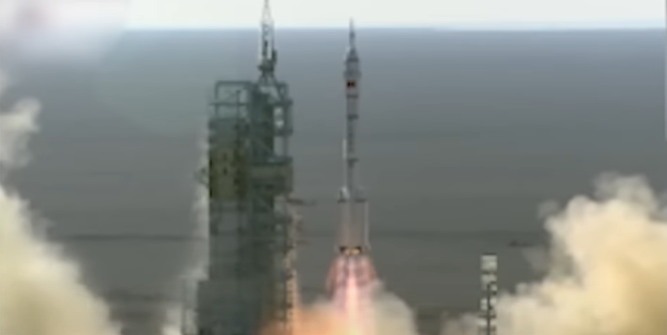
- Launch of Shenzhou 5.
- Mission type: Crewed test flight
- Operator: China Manned Space Agency
- COSPAR ID: 2003-045A
- SATCAT no.: 28043
- Mission duration: 21 hours, 22 minutes, 45 seconds
- Orbits completed: 14

Spacecraft properties
- Spacecraft type: Shenzhou
- Manufacturer: China Aerospace Science and Technology Corporation
- Launch mass: 7,840 kg (17,280 lb)

Crew
- Crew size: 1
- Members: Yang Liwei

Start of mission
- Launch date: 15 October 2003, 01:00:03 UTC (09:00:03 CST)
- Rocket: Long March 2F (Y5)
- Launch site: Jiuquan, LA-4/SLS-1
- Contractor: China Academy of Launch Vehicle Technology

End of mission
- Landing date: 15 October 2003, 22:22:48 UTC
- Landing site: Inner Mongolia (42°14′36″N 111°29′36″E)

Orbital parameters
- Reference system: Geocentric orbit
- Regime: Low Earth orbit
- Perigee altitude: 332 km (206 mi)
- Apogee altitude: 336 km (209 mi)
- Inclination: 42.4°
- Period: 91.2 minutes
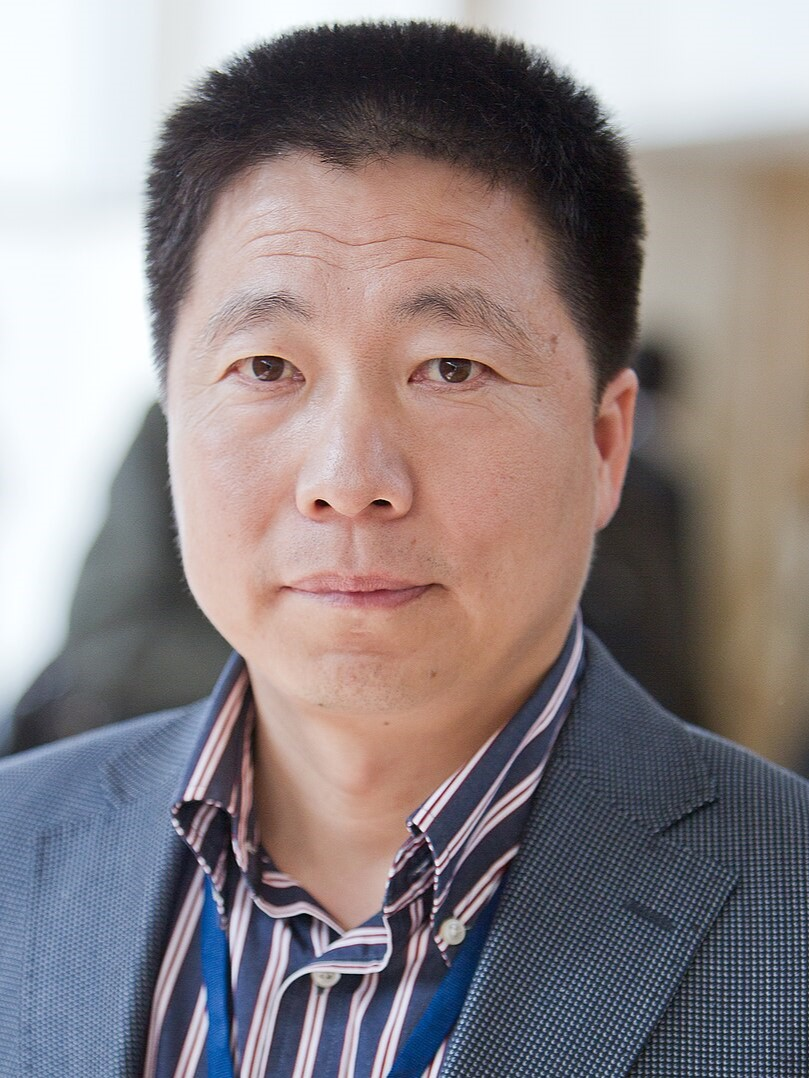
- Mission insignia Yang Liwei Shenzhou program

Shenzhou 5 (simplified Chinese: 神舟五号; traditional Chinese: 神舟五號; pinyin: Shénzhōu wǔ hào) was the first human spaceflight mission of the Chinese space program, launched on 15 October 2003. The Shenzhou spacecraft was launched on a Long March 2F launch vehicle. There had been four previous flights of uncrewed Shenzhou missions since 1999. China became the third country in the world to have independent human spaceflight capability after the Soviet Union/Russia and the United States. As of November 2026, this mission marks the last recent time an astronaut was launched alone to conduct an entirely solo orbital mission.

== Crew ==
Position	Crew
Commander	Yang Liwei; Only spaceflight

== Mission highlights ==
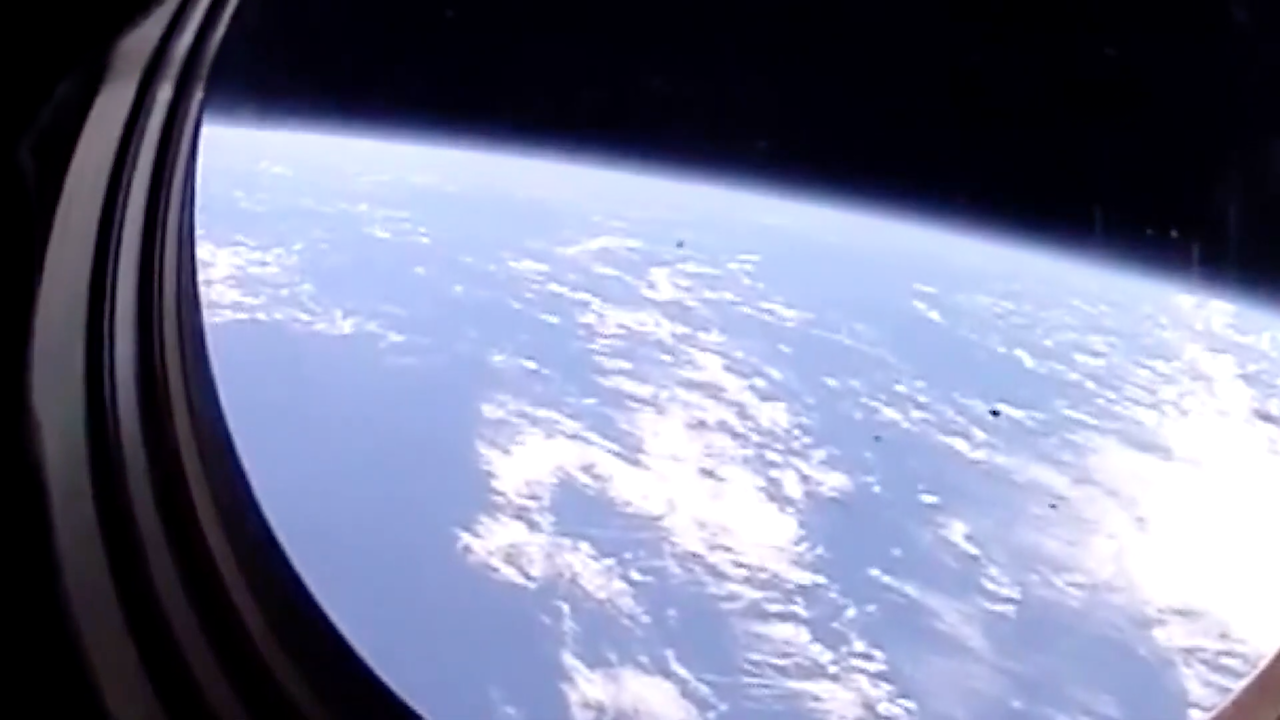
Earth as seen from Shenzhou 5.

Shenzhou 5 was launched at 09:00 (UTC+08:00) from Jiuquan Satellite Launch Center, a launch base in the Gobi Desert in Gansu province, entering orbit 343 kilometres (213 mi; 185 nmi) above Earth at 09:10 (UTC+08:00) with astronaut Yang Liwei, a 38-year-old lieutenant colonel in the People's Liberation Army and former fighter pilot. The space launch made China the third country to independently launch a person into outer space, after the Soviet Union and the United States. The launch of the Shenzhou was the result of a crewed space program which began in 1992.

Neither the launch nor the reentry was televised live, but the time of both launch and reentry had been widely announced beforehand, and news appeared on China Central Television within minutes after both events.

=== Orbital spaceflight ===
The Shenzhou spacecraft made 14 orbits and landed 21 hours after launch. It reentered Earth's atmosphere at 06:04 (UTC+08:00) on 16 October 2003 (22:04 UTC 15 Oct 2003), its parachute opened normally and the astronaut said he was feeling fine. The landing happened at 06:23 (UTC+08:00), just 4.8 km (3.0 mi) from the planned landing site in Inner Mongolia, according to the government. The orbital module of the spacecraft stayed in orbit; it continued with automated experiments until 16 March 2004 and decayed on 30 May.

Premier Wen Jiabao congratulated the country's first person in space after his safe return to Earth. Yang emerged from the reentry capsule about 15 minutes later and waved to members of the recovery team.

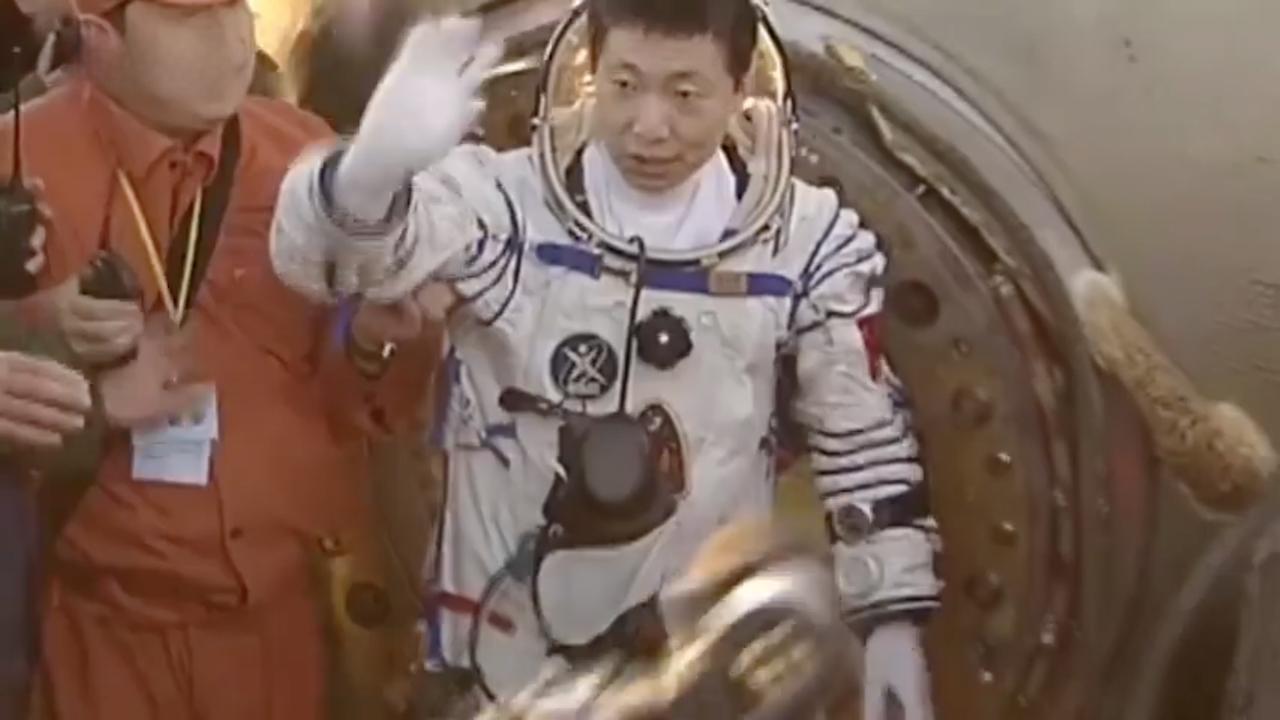
Liwei waving after being helped out of the return capsule.

The Beijing Aerospace Command and Control Center later declared China's first crewed spacecraft mission to be successful after Yang Liwei emerged from his capsule.

=== Yang's experience in space ===
During the flight Yang wore diapers. When questioned about his experience aboard Shenzhou 5, he stated "Better not to piss in diaper...Baby doesn't like it, neither does an adult."

In addition, Yang reported abnormal vibrations that appeared 120 seconds after launch (pogo oscillation), which he described as "very uncomfortable". As a consequence, corrective measures were taken to the design of the following CZ-2F carrier rocket for the Shenzhou 6 flight.

Yang has also reported hearing unknown "knockings" on the Shenzhou spacecraft. He admitted being uncomfortable about the reported knockings. According to him, the "knockings" started and disappeared for an unknown reason. Other Shenzhou taikonauts also reported hearing strange "knockings" on Shenzhou 6 and Shenzhou 7. The strange noises' source remains unknown.

== Politics ==
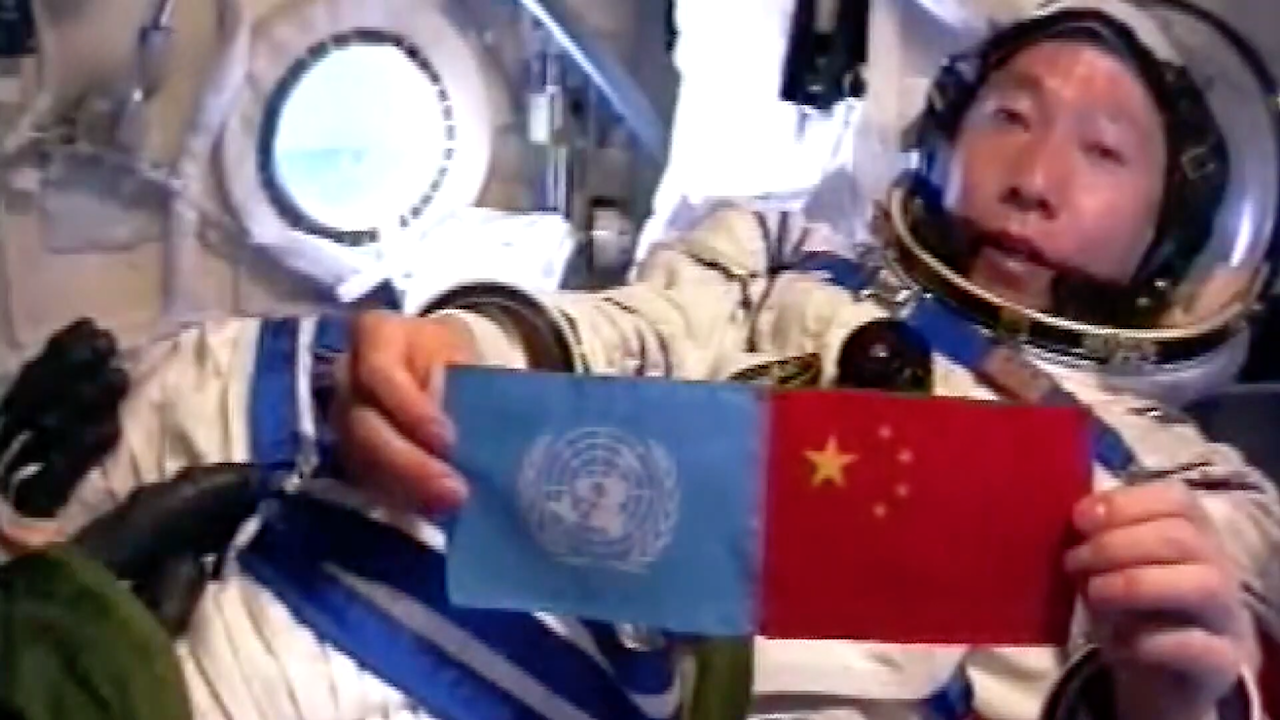
Liwei displays China and UN flags in flight

The launch was widely heralded in the official Chinese state media with newspapers devoting far more space to the launch than any recent event. While the Chinese media portrayed the launch as a triumph for Chinese science and technology, it has also been pointed out in both Chinese and Western media that Yang Liwei showed the flag of the United Nations in addition to the flag of the People's Republic of China. The state media also reported that crop seeds from Taiwan were brought aboard the spacecraft. Both the Chief Executives of Hong Kong and Macau sent letters congratulating all the people involved in the mission and also the central government.

General Secretary and President Hu Jintao, in an official celebration at the Great Hall of the People, hailed China's success in launching its first crewed spacecraft into orbit, describing it as "an honour for our great motherland, an indicator for the initial victory of the country's first crewed space flight and for an historic step taken by the Chinese people in their endeavor to surmount the peak of the world's science and technology".

Hu added, "The Party and the people will never forget those who have set up this outstanding merit in the space industry for the motherland, the people and the nation". He also expressed congratulations and respect to specialists and people who have contributed to China's space mission development on behalf of the CPC Central Committee, the State Council and the Central Military Commission.

The launch was met with praise from around the world. Japanese Prime Minister Junichiro Koizumi called the launch "a great feat". United States President George W. Bush congratulated Chinese President Hu and wished China continued success. A spokesperson for the United States Department of State said that the United States wished to "applaud China's success in becoming only the third country to launch people into space". NASA Administrator Sean O'Keefe called Shenzhou 5 an "important achievement in human exploration" and wished China "a continued safe human space flight program".

The spacecraft has since featured prominently in festivities and celebrations not only in China but also in foreign countries, such as official North Korean commemorative stamps showing the first Chinese crewed spacecraft alongside North Korea's first satellite Kwangmyŏngsŏng-1.

== See also ==
- Long March (rocket family)
- Tiangong program
