= Tiangong program =

Space station program of the People's Republic of China

Diagram of Tiangong-1

The Tiangong program (Chinese: 天宫空间站工程; pinyin: Tiāngōng kōngjiānzhàn gōngchéng; lit. 'Heavenly Palace Space Station Project') is China's space program to create a modular space station, comparable to Mir. This program is independent and unconnected to any other international space-active countries. The program is part of the China Manned Space Program that began in 1992. The core module of the Tiangong space station, the Tianhe ("Harmony of the Heavens") was finally launched on 29 April 2021 marking the start of the Tiangong Space program deployment.

China launched its first space laboratory, Tiangong-1, on 29 September 2011. Following Tiangong-1, a more advanced space laboratory complete with cargo spacecraft, dubbed Tiangong-2, was launched on 15 September 2016. The first module of the 12 part new series of Tiangong space station launched on 29 April 2021.

The project culminated with the Tiangong space station, which consists of a 22.6-ton core module and cargo transport craft, with two more major research modules launched in 2022. It supports three astronauts for long-term habitation.

== Background ==
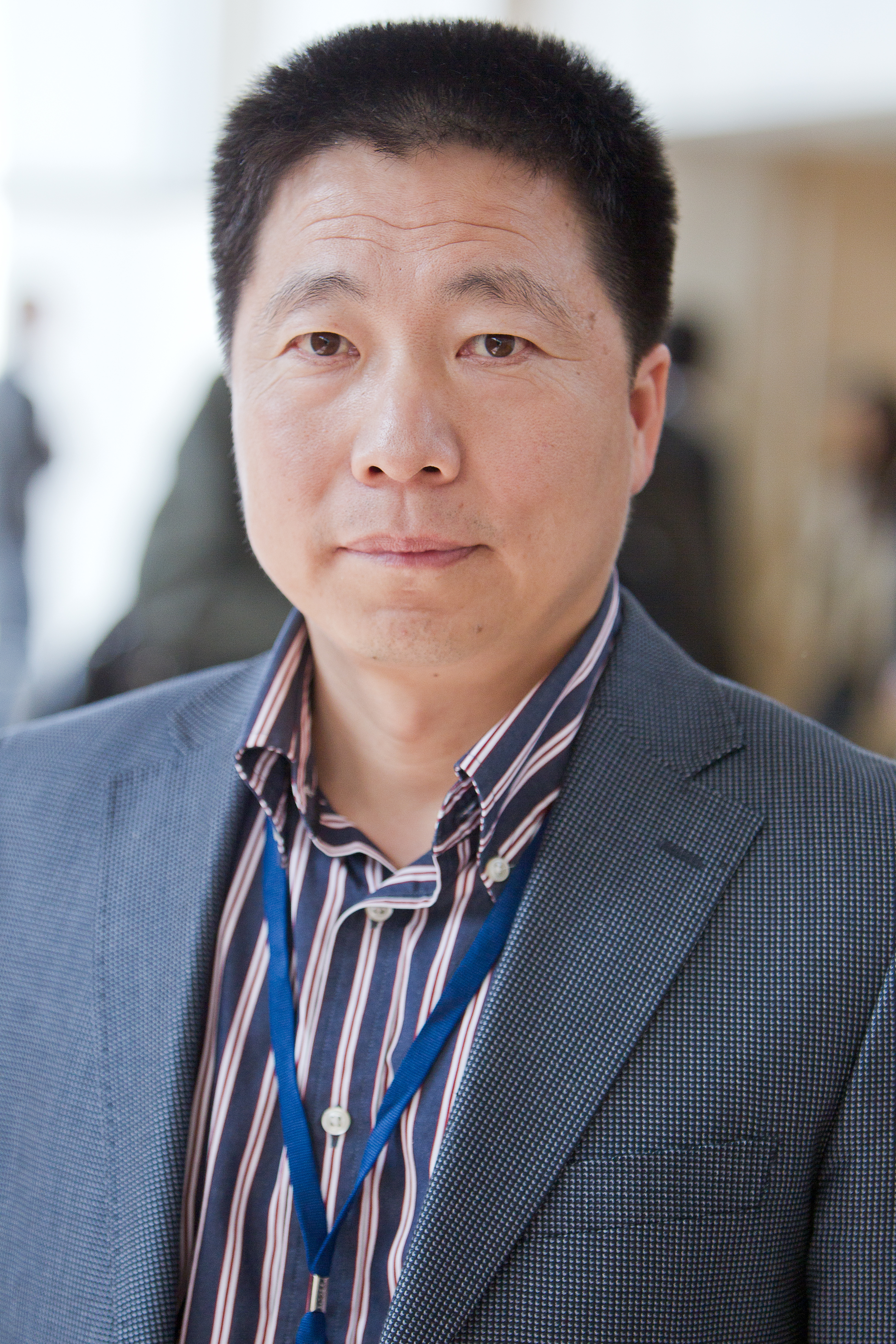
Yang Liwei, first Chinese astronaut, the third country to launch a crewed spaceflight.

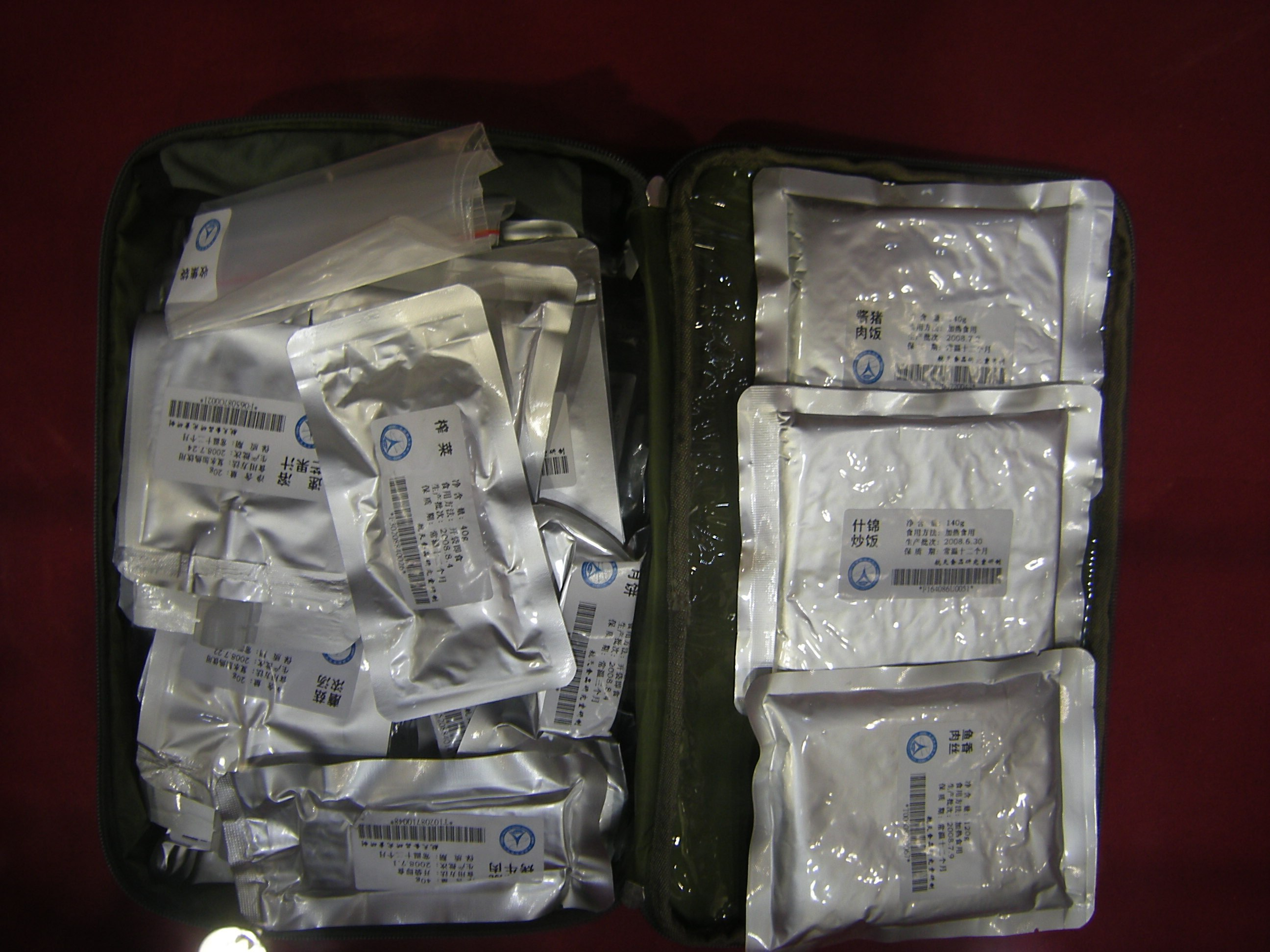
Chinese space food on Shenzhou-7

After the United States threatened to use nuclear weapons during the Korean War, Mao Zedong decided that only a nuclear deterrent of its own would guarantee the security of the newly founded PRC. Thus, Mao announced his decision to develop China's own strategic weapons, including associated missiles. After the launch of mankind's first artificial satellite, Sputnik 1 by the Soviet Union on 4 October 1957, Mao decided to put China on an equal footing with the superpowers ("我们也要搞人造卫星"), using Project 581 with the idea of putting a satellite in orbit by 1959 to celebrate the 10th anniversary of the PRC's founding. However, it would not be until 24 April 1970 that this goal would become a reality.

Mao and Zhou Enlai began the PRC's crewed space program on 14 July 1967. China's first crewed spacecraft design was named Shuguang-1 (曙光一号) in January 1968. Project 714 was officially adopted in April 1971 with the goal of sending two astronauts into space by 1973 aboard the Shuguang spacecraft. The first screening process for astronauts had already ended on 15 March 1971, with 19 astronauts chosen. The program was soon cancelled due to political turmoil.

The next crewed space program was even more ambitious and was proposed in March 1986 as Project 863. This consisted of a crewed spacecraft (Project 863–204) used to ferry astronaut crews to a space station (Project 863–205). Several spaceplane designs were rejected two years later and a simpler space capsule was chosen instead. Although the project did not achieve its goals, it would ultimately become the 1992 Project 921, encompassing the Shenzhou program, the Tiangong program, and the Chinese space station.

On the 50th anniversary of the People's Republic of China's founding, China launched the Shenzhou 1 spacecraft on 20 November 1999 and recovered it after a flight of 21 hours. The country became the third country with a successful crewed space program by sending Yang Liwei into space aboard Shenzhou 5 on 15 October 2003 for more than 21 hours. It was a major success for Chinese space programs.

== Project history ==
In 1999, Project 921-2 was finally given official authorization. Two versions of the station were studied: an 8-metric ton "space laboratory" and 20-metric ton "space station". In 2000, the first model of the planned space station was unveiled at Expo 2000 in Hanover, Germany. This was made up of modules derived from the orbital module of the Shenzhou spacecraft. Overall length of the station would be around 20 m, with a total mass of under 40 metric tons, with possibility of expansion through addition of further modules.

In 2001, Chinese engineers described a three-step process toward the realization of Project 921. The original target date for the fulfillment of the project was 2010.

- First, crewed flight itself (Phase 1); this successfully occurred in 2003
- Second, the orbiting of a space laboratory (Phase 2, a scaled back version of the initial model) that would only be crewed on a short-term basis and left in an automated mode between visits
- The third phase would involve the launch of a larger space laboratory, which would be permanently crewed and be China's first true space station (Phase 3)

Originally, China planned to simply dock Shenzhou 8 and Shenzhou 9 together to form a simple space laboratory. However, it was decided to abandon that plan and launch a small space laboratory instead. In 2007, plans for an 8-metric ton "space laboratory" being launched in 2010 under the designation of Tiangong-1 were made public. This would be an eight-ton space laboratory module with two docking ports. Subsequent flights (Shenzhou 9 and Shenzhou 10) will dock with the laboratory.

On 29 September 2008, Zhang Jianqi (张建启), Vice Director of China crewed space engineering, declared in an interview of China Central Television (CCTV), it is Tiangong-1 that will be the 8-ton "target vehicle", and Shenzhou 8, Shenzhou 9, and Shenzhou 10 will all be spaceships to dock with Tiangong-1 in turn. On 1 October 2008, Shanghai Space Administration, which participated in the development of Shenzhou 8, stated that they succeeded in the simulated experiments for the docking of Tiangong-1 and Shenzhou 8.

In September 2010, the central government formally approved the implementation of China's manned space station project, and plans to build a large-scale, long-term manned national space laboratory around 2020.

On 16 June 2012, Shenzhou 9 was launched from Jiuquan Satellite Launch Center in Inner Mongolia, China, carrying a crew of three. The Shenzhou craft successfully docked with the Tiangong-1 laboratory on 18 June 2012, at 06:07 UTC, marking China's first crewed spacecraft docking.

On 11 June 2013, China launched Shenzhou 10 with a crew of three headed for the Tiangong-1.

Tiangong-2 space laboratory launched on 15 September 2016. This was first crewed with Shenzhou 11 which launched on 17 October 2016 (16 October UTC) from the Jiuquan Satellite Launch Center and docked two days later.

The full 60-metric ton space station will support three astronauts for long-term habitation. The core module, the Tianhe ("Harmony of the Heavens"), launched on 29 April 2021. The Tianhe module was first crewed with the Shenzhou 12 mission which launched and docked on 17 June 2021.

== Details ==
=== Space laboratory phase ===
China's efforts to develop low Earth orbit space station capabilities began with a space laboratory phase, initially planned to include three Tiangong test vehicles (later reduced to two).

==== Tiangong-1 "target vehicle" ====
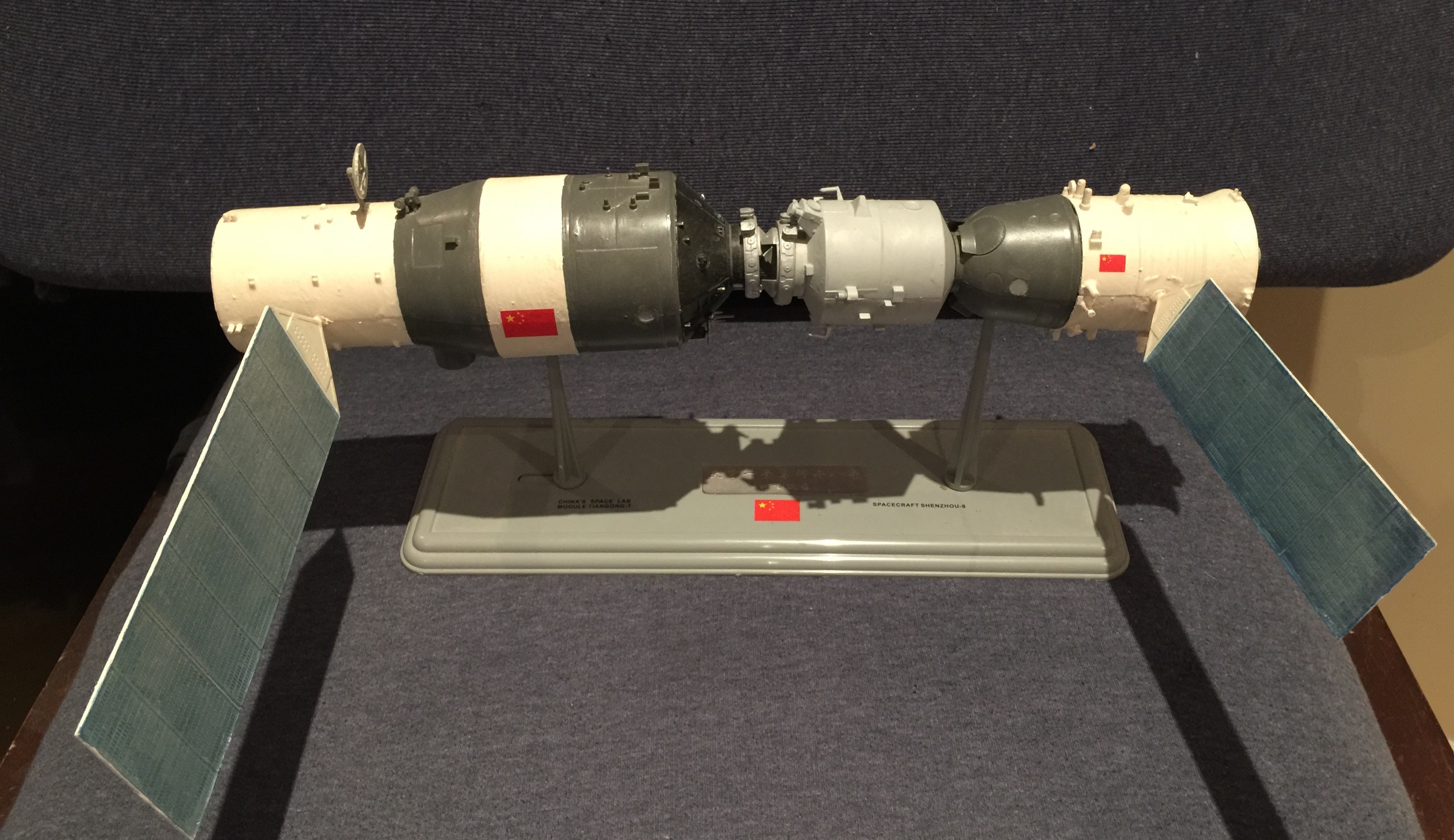
Model of a Shenzhou docked to Tiangong-1

Tiangong-1, described as a "target vehicle", consisted of a propulsion (resource) module and a pressurized experiment module. It measured 10.4 metres (34 ft) in length, 3.35 metres (11.0 ft) in diameter, and had a launch mass of 8,506 kilograms (18,753 lb). The module provided 15 cubic metres (530 cu ft) of pressurized habitable volume. Launched on 29 September 2011, it supported short-duration visits by crews of up to three.

The vehicle was designed to validate and test rendezvous and docking techniques for China's future modular space station and carried several Earth-observation and space environment payloads. Tiangong-1 was visited by three missions: the uncrewed Shenzhou 8 in 2011, which completed China's first orbital docking, followed by the crewed Shenzhou 9 in 2012 and Shenzhou 10 in 2013. These missions demonstrated manual and automated docking, saw a visit from the first and second Chinese women in space, and conducted a series of scientific, medical, and educational activities.

After its two-year design life, Tiangong-1 continued in an extended-application phase that included remote-sensing tasks and routine orbit-maintenance activity. Telemetry with the module ceased in March 2016 after 1,630 days in orbit, leading to its uncontrolled reentry on 2 April 2018.

==== Tiangong-2 "space laboratory" ====
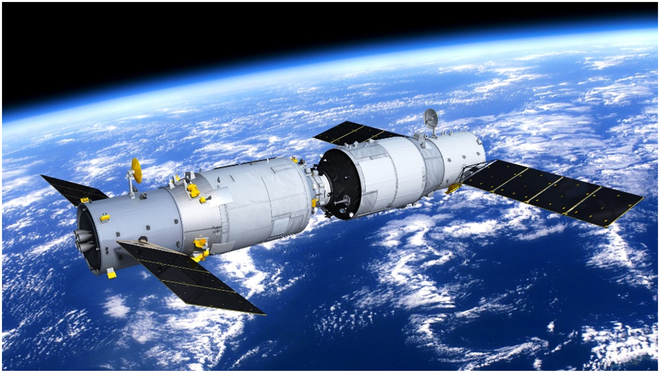
Rendering of Tianzhou 1 docked to Tiangong-2

Early plans for the "space laboratory" phase called for two additional test stations, each about 14.4 metres (47 ft) long, 4.2 metres (14 ft) in diameter, and up to 20,000 kilograms (44,000 lb) in mass. Their planned roles—supporting 20- and 40-day crewed missions—were later consolidated into a single, smaller vehicle.

The resulting Tiangong-2 space laboratory, launched on 15 September 2016, measured 10.4 metres (34 ft) in length and 3.35 metres (11.0 ft) in diameter, had a mass of about 8,600 kilograms (19,000 lb), and provided roughly 14 cubic metres (490 cu ft) of pressurized volume. It hosted a single crewed mission, Shenzhou 11, whose two astronauts lived on board for 30 days from October to November 2016, the longest Chinese crewed spaceflight at the time. During the mission, the crew conducted a series of scientific, technological and medical activities.

Tiangong-2 also enabled China's first cargo resupply and orbital refuelling demonstrations. The Tianzhou 1 cargo ship performed three dockings in 2017 to transfer propellant to Tiangong-2, an essential capability for China's later modular space station. Tianzhou-1 carried no pressurized cargo, but its refueling operations extended Tiangong-2's orbital lifetime. Tiangong-2 was deorbited in a controlled reentry over the South Pacific Ocean on 19 July 2019.

==== Tiangong-3 ====
Tiangong-3 was a proposed space laboratory intended to further expand China's on-orbit habitation and experiment capabilities. The project was cancelled, with planners deciding instead to proceed directly to the development of China's large modular space station.

=== Tiangong space station ===
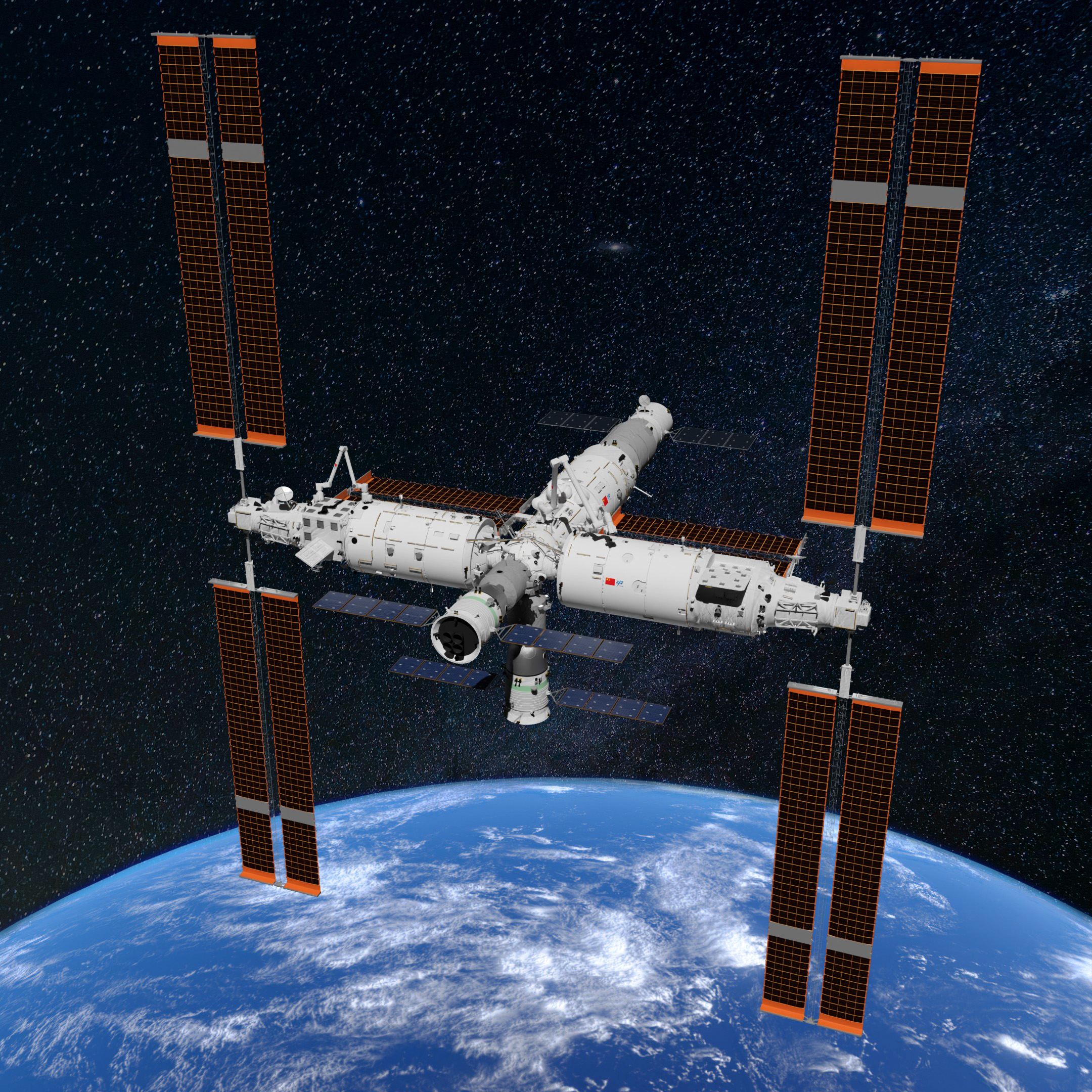
Rendering of the Tiangong space station with Tianhe at center, Wentian on the left, Mengtian on the right, a Tianzhou cargo ship docked aft and two Shenzhou crew ships at the forward docking hub.

The Tiangong space station is China’s permanently crewed modular outpost in low Earth orbit and the principal goal of the third phase of the Tiangong program.

Tiangong consists of the Tianhe core module flanked by two Laboratory Cabin Modules (LCMs):

- Tianhe — launched 29 April 2021, serves as the station’s control and habitation hub, providing life support, living quarters, guidance and navigation systems, and primary power and propulsion. It contains a living compartment, service section, docking hub, communications systems, and the station’s main robotic arm.
- Wentian — launched 24 July 2022, expands the station’s avionics and life-support capacity and adds internal experiment racks and external payload platforms for life-science research. It also includes a dedicated airlock for extravehicular activities, replacing Tianhe’s temporary EVA capability.
- Mengtian — launched 31 October 2022, provides additional internal and external facilities for microgravity research and includes a cargo airlock for transferring payloads between the module interior and exterior.

The station supports three crew members for long-duration missions, up to six during handovers. Tiangong is designed for a service life of at least 10–15 years, with potential for future expansion.

== See also ==
- Chinese space program
  - Tiangong-1
  - Tiangong-2
- List of human spaceflights in Tiangong Program
