= List of human spaceflights, 2021–present =

This is a detailed list of human spaceflights from 2021 to present.

- Green indicates a suborbital flight (including flights that failed to attain intended orbit).
- Grey indicates flights beyond low Earth orbit.

#	Crew	Launch spacecraft	Habitation	Return spacecraft	Brief mission summary
329	(Russia) Oleg Novitsky (3)	9 April 2021 (Russia) Soyuz MS-18	ISS (crew 64/65)	17 October 2021 (Russia) Soyuz MS-18	ISS crew rotation.
329	(Russia) Pyotr Dubrov (United States) Mark T. Vande Hei (2)	9 April 2021 (Russia) Soyuz MS-18	ISS (crew 64/65/66)	30 March 2022 (Russia) Soyuz MS-19	ISS crew rotation.
330	(United States) Shane Kimbrough (3) (United States) K. Megan McArthur (2) (Japan) Akihiko Hoshide (3) (France) Thomas Pesquet (2)	23 April 2021 (United States) SpaceX Crew-2, Endeavour	ISS (crew 65/66)	9 November 2021 (United States) SpaceX Crew-2, Endeavour	ISS crew rotation.
—	(United States) Frederick W. Sturckow (United Kingdom) Dave Mackay	22 May 2021 (United States) Unity 21			First human spaceflight from the State of New Mexico. Reached an altitude of 89.24 km (55.45 mi), crossing the U.S. definition of space, but not the FAI's definition.
331	(China) Nie Haisheng (3) (China) Liu Boming (2) (China) Tang Hongbo	17 June 2021 (China) Shenzhou 12	TSS	17 September 2021 (China) Shenzhou 12	First crew to Tiangong Space Station.
—	(United Kingdom) David Mackay (United States) Michael Masucci (United States) Beth Moses (United Kingdom) Richard Branson (United Kingdom) Colin Bennett (United States) Sirisha Bandla	11 July 2021 (United States) Unity 22			Reached an altitude of 86 km (53 mi), crossing the U.S. definition of space.
332	(United States) Jeff Bezos (United States) Mark Bezos (United States) Wally Funk (Netherlands) Oliver Daemen	20 July 2021 (United States) NS 16			Reached an altitude of 107 km (66 mi), crossing the FAI definition of space.
333	(United States) Jared Isaacman (United States) Sian Proctor (United States) Hayley Arceneaux (United States) Christopher Sembroski	16 September 2021 (United States) Inspiration4, Resilience		18 September 2021 (United States) Inspiration4, Resilience	
334	(Russia) Anton Shkaplerov (4)	5 October 2021 (Russia) Soyuz MS-19	ISS (crew 65/66)	30 March 2022 (Russia) Soyuz MS-19	ISS crew rotation.
334	(Russia) Klim Shipenko (Russia) Yulia Peresild	5 October 2021 (Russia) Soyuz MS-19	ISS (Vyzov)	17 October 2021 (Russia) Soyuz MS-18	
335	(United States) Audrey Powers (Australia) Chris Boshuizen (United States) Glen de Vries (Canada) William Shatner	13 October 2021 (United States) NS 18			Reached an altitude of 107 km (66 mi), crossing the FAI definition of space.
336	(China) Zhai Zhigang (2) (China) Wang Yaping (2) (China) Ye Guangfu	15 October 2021 (China) Shenzhou 13	TSS	16 April 2022 (China) Shenzhou 13	Second crew to Tiangong Space Station.
337	(United States) Raja Chari (United States) Thomas Marshburn (3) (United States) Kayla Barron (Germany) Matthias Maurer	11 November 2021 (United States) SpaceX Crew-3, Endurance	ISS (crew 66/67)	6 May 2022 (United States) SpaceX Crew-3, Endurance	ISS crew rotation.
338	(Russia) Alexander Misurkin (3) (Japan) Yusaku Maezawa (Japan) Yozo Hirano	8 December 2021, (Russia) Soyuz MS-20	ISS	20 December 2021, (Russia) Soyuz MS-20	
339	(United States) Laura Shepard Churchley (United States) Michael Strahan (United States) Dylan Taylor (United States) Evan Dick (United States) Lane Bess (United States) Cameron Bess	11 December 2021 (United States) NS 19			Reached an altitude of greater than 100 km (62 mi), crossing the FAI definition of space.
340	(Russia) Oleg Artemyev (3) (Russia) Denis Matveev (Russia) Sergey Korsakov	18 March 2022, (Russia) Soyuz MS-21	ISS (crew 66/67)	29 September 2022, (Russia) Soyuz MS-21	ISS crew rotation.
341	(United States) Marty Allen (United States) Sharon Hagle (United States) Marc Hagle (United States) Jim Kitchen (United States) George Nield (United States) Gary Lai	31 March 2022 (United States) NS 20			Reached an altitude of greater than 100 km (62 mi), crossing the FAI definition of space.
342	(United States) / (Spain) Michael López-Alegría (5) (United States) Larry Connor (Canada) Mark Pathy (Israel) Eytan Stibbe	8 April 2022, (United States) Axiom Mission 1, Endeavour	ISS	25 April 2022, (United States) Axiom Mission 1, Endeavour	
343	(United States) Kjell N. Lindgren (2) (United States) Robert Hines (Italy) Samantha Cristoforetti (2) (United States) Jessica Watkins	27 April 2022 (United States) SpaceX Crew-4, Freedom	ISS (crew 67/68)	14 October 2022 (United States) SpaceX Crew-4, Freedom	ISS crew rotation.
344	(United Kingdom) Hamish Harding (Brazil) Victor Correa Hespanha (United States) Evan Dick (2) (United States) Katya Echazarreta (United States) Jaison Robinson (United States) Victor Vescovo	4 June 2022 (United States) NS 21			Reached an altitude of greater than 100 km (62 mi), crossing the FAI definition of space.
345	(China) Chen Dong (2) (China) Liu Yang (2) (China) Cai Xuzhe	5 June 2022 (China) Shenzhou 14	TSS	4 December 2022 (China) Shenzhou 14	Third crew to Tiangong Space Station.
346	(United States) Coby Cotton (Portugal) Mário Ferreira (United States) Vanessa O'Brien (United States) Clint Kelly III (Egypt) Sara Sabry (United States) Steve Young	4 August 2022 (United States) NS 22			Reached an altitude of greater than 100 km (62 mi), crossing the FAI definition of space.
347	(Russia) Sergey Prokopyev (2) (Russia) Dmitry Petelin (United States) Francisco Rubio	21 September 2022, (Russia) Soyuz MS-22	ISS (crew 67/68/69)	27 September 2023, (Russia) Soyuz MS-23	ISS crew rotation.
348	(United States) Nicole Aunapu Mann (United States) Josh A. Cassada (Japan) Koichi Wakata (5) (Russia) Anna Kikina	5 October 2022 (United States) SpaceX Crew-5, Endurance	ISS (crew 68)	12 March 2023 (United States) SpaceX Crew-5, Endurance	ISS crew rotation.
349	(China) Fei Junlong (2) (China) Deng Qingming (China) Zhang Lu	29 November 2022 (China) Shenzhou 15	TSS	3 June 2023 (China) Shenzhou 15	Fourth crew to Tiangong Space Station.
350	(United States) Stephen G. Bowen (4) (United States) Warren Hoburg (United Arab Emirates) Sultan Al Neyadi (Russia) Andrey Fedyaev	2 March 2023 (United States) SpaceX Crew-6, Endeavour	ISS (crew 68/69)	4 September 2023 (United States) SpaceX Crew-6, Endeavour	ISS crew rotation.
351	(United States) Peggy Whitson (4) (United States) John Shoffner (Saudi Arabia) Ali AlQarni (Saudi Arabia) Rayyanah Barnawi	21 May 2023 (United States) Axiom Mission 2, Freedom	ISS	31 May 2023 (United States) Axiom Mission 2, Freedom	
—	(United States) Michael Masucci (United States) Frederick W. Sturckow (United States) Beth Moses (United States) Luke Mays (United States) Jamila Gilbert (United States) Christopher Huie	25 May 2023 (United States) Unity 25			Reached an altitude of 87.2 km (54.2 mi), crossing the U.S. definition of space.
352	(China) Jing Haipeng (4) (China) Zhu Yangzhu (China) Gui Haichao	30 May 2023 (China) Shenzhou 16	TSS	31 October 2023 (China) Shenzhou 16	Fifth crew to Tiangong Space Station.
—	(United States) Michael Masucci (Italy) Walter Villadei (Italy) Angelo Landolfi (Italy) Nicola Pecile (Italy) Pantaleone Carlucci (United Kingdom) Colin Bennett	29 June 2023 (United States) Galactic 01			Reached an altitude of 85.1 km (52.9 mi), crossing the U.S. definition of space.
—	(United States) Frederick Sturckow (United States) Kelly Latimer (United States) Beth Moses (United Kingdom) Jon Goodwin (Antigua and Barbuda) Keisha Schahaff (Antigua and Barbuda) Anastatia Mayers	10 August 2023 (United States) Galactic 02			Reached an altitude of 88.5 km (55.0 mi), crossing the U.S. definition of space.
353	(United States) Jasmin Moghbeli (Denmark) Andreas Mogensen (2) (Japan) Satoshi Furukawa (2) (Russia) Konstantin Borisov	26 August 2023 (United States) SpaceX Crew-7, Endurance	ISS (crew 69/70)	12 March 2024 (United States) SpaceX Crew-7, Endurance	ISS crew rotation.
—	(United States) Michael Masucci (United States) Beth Moses (United Kingdom) Adrian Reynard (Italy) Nicola Pecile (United States) Ken Baxter (United Kingdom) / (South Africa) Timothy Nash	8 September 2023 (United States) Galactic 03			Reached an altitude of 88.56 km (55 mi), crossing the U.S. definition of space.
354	(Russia) Oleg Kononenko (5) (Russia) Nikolai Chub	15 September 2023, (Russia) Soyuz MS-24	ISS (69/70/71)	23 September 2024 (Russia) Soyuz MS-25	ISS crew rotation.
354	(United States) Loral O'Hara	15 September 2023, (Russia) Soyuz MS-24	ISS (crew 69/70)	6 April 2024, (Russia) Soyuz MS-24	ISS crew rotation.
—	(United States) Frederick Sturckow (United States) Kelly Latimer (United States) Beth Moses (United Kingdom) Trevor Beattie (Pakistan) Namira Salim (United States) Ron Rosano	6 October 2023 (United States) Galactic 04			Reached an altitude of 87.38 km (54.3 mi), crossing the U.S. definition of space.
355	(China) Tang Hongbo (2) (China) Tang Shengjie (China) Jiang Xinlin	26 October 2023 (China) Shenzhou 17	TSS	30 April 2024 (China) Shenzhou 17	Sixth crew to Tiangong Space Station.
—	(United States) Michael Masucci (United States) Kelly Latimer (United Kingdom) Colin Bennett (United States) Alan Stern (United States) Kellie Gerardi (Italy) Ketty Maisonrouge	2 November 2023 (United States) Galactic 05			Reached an altitude of 87.2 km (54.2 mi), crossing the U.S. definition of space.
356	(United States) / (Spain) Michael López-Alegría (6) (Italy) Walter Villadei (2) (Turkey) Alper Gezeravcı (Sweden) / (Norway) Marcus Wandt	18 January 2024, (United States) Axiom Mission 3, Freedom	ISS	09 February 2024, (United States) Axiom Mission 3, Freedom	
—	(United States) Frederick Sturckow (Italy) Nicola Pecile (Ukraine) / (United States) Lina Borozdina (United States) Robie Vaughn (Austria) Franz Haider (United States) Neil Kornswiet	26 January 2024 (United States) Galactic 06			Reached an altitude of 88.8 km (55.2 mi), crossing the U.S. definition of space.
357	(United States) Matthew Dominick (United States) Michael Barratt (3) (United States) Jeanette Epps (Russia) Alexander Grebenkin	4 March 2024 (United States) SpaceX Crew-8, Endeavour	ISS (crew 70/71)	25 October 2024 (United States) SpaceX Crew-8, Endeavour	ISS crew rotation.
358	(Russia) Oleg Novitsky (4) (Belarus) Maryna Vasileuskaya	23 March 2024, (Russia) Soyuz MS-25	ISS	6 April 2024, (Russia) Soyuz MS-24	ISS EP-21. First Belarusian in space (Vasileuskaya).
358	(United States) Tracy Caldwell-Dyson (3)	23 March 2024, (Russia) Soyuz MS-25	ISS (70/71)	23 September 2024 (Russia) Soyuz MS-25	ISS crew rotation.
359	(China) Ye Guangfu (2) (China) Li Cong (China) Li Guangsu	25 April 2024 (China) Shenzhou 18	TSS	3 November 2024 (China) Shenzhou 18	Seventh crew to Tiangong Space Station.
360	(United States) Mason Angel (France) Sylvain Chiron (United States) Ed Dwight (United States) Carol Schaller (United States) Kenneth Hess (India) Thotakura Gopichand	19 May 2024 (United States) NS 25			Reached an altitude of 106 km (66 mi), crossing the FAI definition of space.
361	(United States) Barry E. Wilmore (3) (United States) Sunita Williams (3)	5 June 2024 (United States) Boeing CFT	ISS	18 March 2025 (United States) SpaceX Crew-9, Freedom	Crewed Flight Test to International Space Station.
—	(Italy) Nicola Pecile (Canada) Jameel Janjua (Turkey) Tuva Cihangir Atasever (Italy) Giorgio Manenti (United States) (Israel) Irving Pergament (United States) Andy Sadhwani	8 June 2024 (United States) Galactic 07			Reached an altitude of 87.5 km (54.4 mi), crossing the U.S. definition of space.
362	(United Kingdom) / (Singapore) Nicolina Elrick (United States) Karsen Kitchen (United States) Rob Ferl (Ukraine) Eugene Grin (Iran) / (United States) Eiman Jahangir (United States) / (Israel) Ephraim Rabin	29 August 2024 (United States) NS 26			Reached an altitude of 104 km (65 mi), crossing the FAI definition of space.
363	(United States) Jared Isaacman (2) (United States) Scott Poteet (United States) Sarah Gillis (United States) Anna Menon	10 September 2024 (United States) Polaris Dawn, Resilience		15 September 2024 (United States) Polaris Dawn, Resilience	First private spacewalk.
364	(Russia) Aleksey Ovchinin (4) (Russia) Ivan Vagner (2) (United States) Donald Pettit (4)	11 September 2024, (Russia) Soyuz MS-26	ISS (crew 71/72)	20 April 2025, (Russia) Soyuz MS-26	ISS crew rotation.
365	(United States) Nick Hague (3) (Russia) Aleksandr Gorbunov	28 September 2024 (United States) SpaceX Crew-9, Freedom	ISS (crew 72)	18 March 2025 (United States) SpaceX Crew-9, Freedom	ISS crew rotation.
366	(China) Cai Xuzhe (2) (China) Song Lingdong (China) Wang Haoze	29 October 2024 (China) Shenzhou 19	TSS	29 April 2025 (China) Shenzhou 19	Tiangong Space Station crew rotation.
367	(United States) James "J. D." Russell (United States) Emily Calandrelli (United States) Austin Litteral (United States) Marc Hagle (2) (United States) Sharon Hagle (2) (Canada) Henry (Hank) Wolfond	22 November 2024 (United States) NS 28			Reached an altitude of 104 km (65 mi), crossing the FAI definition of space.
368	(United States) Lane Bess (2) (Spain) Jesús Calleja (United States) Dr. Richard Scott (United States) Tushar Shah (Australia) Elaine Chia Hyde (Australia) Robert Wilson	25 February 2025 (United States) NS 30			Reached an altitude of 107 km (66 mi), crossing the FAI definition of space.
369	(United States) Anne McClain (2) (United States) Nichole Ayers (Japan) Takuya Onishi (2) (Russia) Kirill Peskov	14 March 2025 (United States) SpaceX Crew-10, Endurance	ISS (crew 72/73)	9 August 2025 (United States) SpaceX Crew-10, Endurance	ISS crew rotation.
370	(Malta) / (Saint Kitts and Nevis) (Note: Wang was born in China but lives primarily in Svalbard and since 2023 is also a citizen of Malta and Saint Kitts and Nevis through their golden visa programs. He wore the flag of Malta on his spacesuit during the spaceflight.) Chun Wang (Norway) / (United Kingdom) (Note: Mikkelsen was born in the United Kingdom, but is now a citizen of Norway. She wore the flag of Norway on her spacesuit during the spaceflight.) Jannicke Mikkelsen (Germany) Rabea Rogge (Australia) Eric Philips	1 April 2025 (United States) Fram2, Resilience		4 April 2025 (United States) Fram2, Resilience	First crewed spaceflight to enter a polar orbit around Earth.
371	(Russia) Sergey Ryzhikov (3) (Russia) Alexey Zubritsky (United States) Jonny Kim	8 April 2025 (Russia) Soyuz MS-27	ISS (crew 72/73)	9 December 2025 (Russia) Soyuz MS-27	ISS crew rotation.
372	(United States) / (The Bahamas) Aisha Bowe (United States) Amanda Nguyen (United States) Gayle King (United States) Kerianne Flynn (United States) Katy Perry (United States) Lauren Sánchez	14 April 2025 (United States) NS 31			Reached an altitude of greater than 100 km (62 mi), crossing the FAI definition of space.
373	(China) Chen Dong (3) (China) Chen Zhongrui (China) Wang Jie	24 April 2025 (China) Shenzhou 20	TSS	14 November 2025 (China) Shenzhou 21	Tiangong Space Station crew rotation.
374	(New Zealand) Mark Rocket (Panama) Jaime Alemán (Puerto Rico) Aymette (Amy) Medina Jorge (United States) Dr. Gretchen Green (Canada) Jesse Williams (United States) Paul Jeris	31 May 2025 (United States) NS 32			Reached an altitude of greater than 100 km (62 mi), crossing the FAI definition of space.
375	(United States) Peggy Whitson (5) (India) Shubhanshu Shukla (Poland) Sławosz Uznański-Wiśniewski (Hungary) Tibor Kapu	25 June 2025, (United States) Axiom Mission 4, Grace	ISS	15 July 2025, (United States) Axiom Mission 4, Grace	
376	(United States) Allie Kuehner; (United States) Carl Kuehner; (United States) Leland Larson; (United States) Freddie Rescigno, Jr.; (Nigeria) Owolabi Salis; (United States) James (Jim) Sitkin	29 June 2025 (United States) NS 33			Reached an altitude of greater than 100 km (62 mi), crossing the FAI definition of space.
377	(United States) Zena Cardman (United States) Michael Fincke (4) (Japan) Kimiya Yui (2) (Russia) Oleg Platonov	1 August 2025 (United States) SpaceX Crew-11, Endeavour	ISS (crew 73/74)	15 January 2026 (United States) SpaceX Crew-11, Endeavour	ISS crew rotation.
378	(United States) James (J.D.) Russell (2); (Puerto Rico) Deborah Martorell; (Saint Kitts and Nevis) H.E. Justin Sun; (Turkey) Gökhan Erdem; (United Kingdom) Lionel Pitchford; (United States) Arvinder (Arvi) Singh Bahal	3 August 2025 (United States) NS 34			Reached an altitude of greater than 100 km (62 mi), crossing the FAI definition of space.
379	(United States) Clint Kelly III (2); (United States) Aaron Newman; (United States) Jeff Elgin; (Ukraine) Vitalii Ostrovsky; (Kazakhstan) Danna Karagussova; (United States) William H. Lewis	8 October 2025 (United States) NS 36			Reached an altitude of greater than 100 km (62 mi), crossing the FAI definition of space.
380	(China) Zhang Lu (2) (China) Wu Fei (China) Zhang Hongzhang	31 October 2025 (China) Shenzhou 21	TSS	29 May 2026 (China) Shenzhou 22	Tiangong Space Station crew rotation.
381	(Russia) Sergey Kud-Sverchkov (2) (Russia) Sergey Mikayev (United States) Christopher Williams	27 November 2025 (Russia) Soyuz MS-28	ISS (crew 73/74)	26 July 2026 (Russia) Soyuz MS-28	ISS crew rotation.
382	(Germany) Michaela Benthaus; (United States) Joey Hyde; (Germany) (United States) Hans Koenigsmann; (United States) Neal Milch; (South Africa) Adonis Pouroulis; (United States) Jason Stansell	20 December 2025 (United States) NS 37			Reached an altitude of greater than 100 km (62 mi), crossing the FAI definition of space.
383	(United States) Tim Drexler; (United States) Linda Edwards; (France) Alain Fernandez; (Spain) Alberto Gutiérrez; (United States) Jim Hendren; (United States) Laura Stiles	21 January 2026 (United States) NS 38			Reached an altitude of 106 km (66 mi), crossing the FAI definition of space.
384	(United States) Jessica Meir (2) (United States) Jack Hathaway (France) Sophie Adenot (Russia) Andrey Fedyaev (2)	13 February 2026 (United States) SpaceX Crew-12, Freedom	ISS (crew 74/75)	8 October 2026 (United States) SpaceX Crew-12, Freedom	ISS crew rotation.
385	(United States) Reid Wiseman (2) (United States) Victor Glover (2) (United States) Christina Koch (2) (Canada) Jeremy Hansen	1 April 2026 (United States) Artemis II, Space Launch System		11 April 2026 (United States) Artemis II, Space Launch System	Flyby of the Moon. First human spaceflight beyond low Earth orbit since 1972.
386	(China) Zhu Yangzhu (2) (China) Zhang Zhiyuan (China) Lai Ka-ying	24 May 2026 (China) Shenzhou 23	TSS	In orbit	Tiangong Space Station crew rotation.
387	(Russia) Pyotr Dubrov (2) (Russia) Anna Kikina (2) (United States) Anil Menon	14 July 2026 (Russia) Soyuz MS-29	ISS (crew 74/75)	In orbit	ISS crew rotation.
388	(United States) Jessica Watkins (2) (United States) Luke Delaney (Canada) Joshua Kutryk (Russia) Sergey Teteryatnikov	1 October 2026 (United States) SpaceX Crew-13, Grace	ISS (crew 75)	In orbit	ISS crew rotation.

== See also ==
- List of human spaceflight programs
- List of human spaceflights
- List of human spaceflights, 1961–1970
- List of human spaceflights, 1971–1980
- List of human spaceflights, 1981–1990
- List of human spaceflights, 1991–2000
- List of human spaceflights, 2001–2010
- List of human spaceflights, 2011–2020
