= List of Asian astronauts =

This is a list of astronauts, who are in a restricted sense, Asians.

If "Asian" is restricted to refer to people from the continent of Asia, exclusive of Asian Russia and Turkey, who are not of predominantly European, African, or American ancestry, then the list is as follows:

The first country listed is that of citizenship; the second, if any, is that of the Asian country of birth and/or ancestry, where different. Those of Asian ancestry but were born outside Asia are excluded.

The table lists astronauts whose origin or ancestry is in Central, East, South, Southeast, and West Asia.

== List ==
#	Image	Name Birth date	Country	Notes	Missions (Launch date)
1		Phạm Tuân; February 14, 1947	Vietnam	First Vietnamese and first person of Asian origin to be in space.	Soyuz 37 (July 23, 1980)
2		Jügderdemidiin Gürragchaa; December 5, 1947	Mongolia	First Mongolian in space.	Soyuz 39 (March 22, 1981)
3		Rakesh Sharma; January 13, 1949	India	First Indian in space.	Soyuz T-11/10 (April 3, 1984)
4		Taylor Wang; June 16, 1940	United States (Taiwan)	First person of Chinese ancestry in space Second Asian American in space, after Ellison Onizuka	STS-51-B (April 29, 1985)
5		Sultan bin Salman bin Abdulaziz Al Saud; June 27, 1956	Saudi Arabia	First Saudi and first Arab in space.	STS-51-G (June 17, 1985)
6		Muhammed Faris; May 26, 1951	Syria	First Syrian in space.	Soyuz TM-3/2 (July 22, 1987)
7		Musa Manarov; March 22, 1951	Soviet Union (Azerbaijan)	First Azeri in space.	Soyuz TM-4 (December 21, 1987); Soyuz TM-11 (December 2, 1990)
8		Abdul Ahad Momand; January 1, 1959	Afghanistan	First Afghan in space.	Soyuz TM-6/5 (August 29, 1988)
9		Toyohiro Akiyama; July 22, 1942	Japan	First Japanese citizen in space.	Soyuz TM-11/10 (December 2, 1990)
10		Toktar Aubakirov; July 27, 1946	Soviet Union (Kazakhstan)	First ethnic Kazakh in space.	Soyuz TM-13/12 (October 2, 1991)
11		Eugene Trinh; September 14, 1950	United States (South Vietnam)	First Vietnamese American in space.	STS-50 (June 25, 1992)
12		Mamoru Mohri; January 29, 1948	Japan		STS-47 (September 12, 1992); STS-99 (February 11, 2000)
13		Talgat Musabayev; January 7, 1951	Russia (Kazakhstan)		Soyuz TM-19 (July 1, 1994); Soyuz TM-27 (January 29, 1998); Soyuz TM-32/31 (April 28, 2001)
14		Chiaki Mukai; May 6, 1952	Japan	First Japanese woman and first Asian woman in space.	STS-65 (July 8, 1994); STS-95 (October 29, 1998)
15		Koichi Wakata; August 1, 1963	Japan	Served on the ISS in Expedition 18, 19, 20, Expedition 38/39 and Expedition 68.	STS-72 (July 11, 1996); STS-92 (October 11, 2000); STS-119/127 (March 15, 2009); Soyuz TMA-11M (November 7, 2013); SpaceX Crew-5 (October 5, 2022)
16		Kalpana Chawla; March 17, 1962	United States (India)	First Indian American in space. Died on the Columbia.	STS-87 (19 November 1997); STS-107 (16 January 2003)
17		Takao Doi; September 18, 1954	Japan	First Japanese spacewalker.	STS-87 (November 19, 1997); STS-123 (March 11, 2008)
18		Salizhan Sharipov; August 24, 1964	Russia (Kyrgyzstan)	Of Uzbek ancestry. Served on ISS Expedition 10.	STS-89 (January 22, 1998); Soyuz TMA-5 (October 14, 2004)
19		Fyodor Yurchikhin; January 3, 1959	Russia (Georgia)	First Georgian in space, of Pontic Greek ancestry. Served on the ISS in Expedition 15.	STS-112 (October 7, 2002); Soyuz TMA-10 (April 7, 2007)
20		Ilan Ramon; June 20, 1954	Israel	First Israeli in space. Died on the Columbia.	STS-107 (January 16, 2003)
21		Yang Liwei; June 21, 1965	China	First taikonaut from the People's Republic of China. First person launched by an independent spaceflight mission from Asia.	Shenzhou 5 (October 15, 2003)
22		Soichi Noguchi; April 15, 1965	Japan	Served on the ISS in (Expedition 22/23) and (Expedition 64/65).	STS-114 (July 26, 2005); Soyuz TMA-17 (December 20, 2009); SpaceX Crew-1 (November 16, 2020)
23, 24		Fei Junlong; May 5, 1965	China		Shenzhou 6 (October 12, 2005); Shenzhou 15 (November 29, 2022)
23, 24		Nie Haisheng; October 13, 1964	China		Shenzhou 6 (October 12, 2005); Shenzhou 10 (June 11, 2013); Shenzhou 12 (June 17, 2021)
25		Anousheh Ansari; September 12, 1966	United States (Iran)	First Iranian-American in space.	Soyuz TMA-9/8 (September 18, 2006)
26		Sheikh Muszaphar Shukor; July 27, 1972	Malaysia	First Malaysian in space.	Soyuz TMA-11/10 (October 10, 2007)
27		Yi So-yeon; June 2, 1978	South Korea	First Korean citizen in space.	Soyuz TMA-11/12 (April 8, 2008)
28		Akihiko Hoshide; December 28, 1968	Japan	Served on the ISS in (Expedition 32/33).	STS-124 (May 31, 2008); Soyuz TMA-05M (15 July 2012); SpaceX Crew-2 (23 April 2021)
29, 30, 31		Jing Haipeng; October 24, 1966	China		Shenzhou 7 (September 25, 2008); Shenzhou 9 (June 16, 2012); Shenzhou 11 (October 17, 2016); Shenzhou 16 (May 30, 2023)
29, 30, 31		Liu Boming; October 29, 1966	China		Shenzhou 7 (September 25, 2008); Shenzhou 12 (June 17, 2021)
29, 30, 31		Zhai Zhigang; October 10, 1966	China		Shenzhou 7 (September 25, 2008); Shenzhou 13 (October 15, 2021)
32		Naoko Yamazaki; December 27, 1970	Japan		STS-131 (April 5, 2010)
33		Satoshi Furukawa; April 4, 1964	Japan	Served on the ISS in (Expedition 28/29).	Soyuz TMA-02M (7 June 2011); SpaceX Crew-7 (26 August 2023)
34, 35		Liu Wang; 1970	China		Shenzhou 9 (June 16, 2012)
34, 35		Liu Yang; 1978	China	First Chinese woman in space.	Shenzhou 9 (June 16, 2012)
36, 37		Wang Yaping; January 1988	China	First Asian female astronaut to perform a spacewalk (Shenzhou 13).	Shenzhou 10 (June 11, 2013); Shenzhou 13 (October 15, 2021)
36, 37		Zhang Xiaoguang; May 1966	China		Shenzhou 10 (June 11, 2013)
38		Kimiya Yui; January 30, 1970	Japan	Served on the ISS in (Expedition 44/45).	Soyuz TMA-17M (July 22, 2015); Soyuz MS-11 (August 1, 2025)
39		Aidyn Aimbetov; July 27, 1972	Kazakhstan		Soyuz TMA-18M (September 2, 2015)
40		Takuya Onishi; December 22, 1975	Japan	Served on the ISS in (Expedition 48/49/72/73).	Soyuz MS-01 (July 7, 2016); SpaceX Crew-10 (March 14, 2025)
41		Chen Dong; December 12, 1978	China		Shenzhou 11 (October 17, 2016); Shenzhou 14 (June 5, 2022); Shenzhou 20/21 (April 24, 2025)
42		Norishige Kanai; December 5, 1976	Japan	Served on the ISS on (Expedition 54/55).	Soyuz MS-07 (December 27, 2017)
43		Hazza Al Mansouri; December 13, 1983	UAE	First United Arab Emirates in space.	Soyuz MS-15/12 (September 25, 2019)
44		Tang Hongbo; October, 1975	China		Shenzhou 12 (June 17, 2021) Shenzhou 17 (October 26, 2023)
45		Sirisha Bandla; 1988	United States (India)		Virgin Galactic Unity 22 (July 11, 2021)
46		Ye Guangfu; September, 1980	China		Shenzhou 13 (October 15, 2021); Shenzhou 18 (April 25, 2024)
47, 48		Yozo Hirano; 1985	Japan	Space tourist from Space Adventures; First space tourists from Japan; First time two Japanese people were launched together.	Soyuz MS-20 (December 8, 2021)
47, 48		Yusaku Maezawa; 22 November 1975	Japan	Space tourist from Space Adventures; First space tourists from Japan; First time two Japanese people were launched together.	Soyuz MS-20 (December 8, 2021)
49		Eytan Stibbe; January 12, 1958	Israel	Space tourist from Axiom Space. First Space tourist from Israel.	Axiom Mission 1 (April 8, 2022)
50		Cai Xuzhe; May, 1976	China		Shenzhou 14 (June 5, 2022)
51		Zhang Lu; November, 1976	China		Shenzhou 15 (September 29, 2022); Shenzhou 21/22 (October 31, 2025)
52		Deng Qingming; March, 1966	China		Shenzhou 15 (September 29, 2022)
53		Sultan Al Neyadi; May 23, 1981	UAE	First United Arab Emirates for long duration mission in space.	SpaceX Crew-6 (March 2, 2023)
54, 55		Ali AlQarni; March, 1992	Saudi Arabia	First Saudi astronaut to ISS.	Axiom Mission 2 (May 21, 2023)
54, 55		Rayyanah Barnawi; September, 1988	Saudi Arabia	First Saudi astronaut to ISS. First female Saudi astronaut in space.	Axiom Mission 2 (May 21, 2023)
56, 57		Gui Haichao; November, 1986	China	First civilian taikonaut in space.	Shenzhou 16 (May 30, 2023)
56, 57		Zhu Yangzhu; September, 1986	China		Shenzhou 16 (May 30, 2023)
58		Namira Salim	Pakistan	First Pakistani in space.	Galactic 04 (October 6, 2023)
59, 60		Jiang Xinlin; February, 1988	China		Shenzhou 17 (October 26, 2023)
59, 60		Tang Shengjie; December, 1989	China		Shenzhou 17 (October 26, 2023)
61		Alper Gezeravcı; December, 1979	Turkey	First Turk in space and to ISS.	Axiom Mission 3 (January 18, 2024)
62, 63		Li Cong; October, 1989	China		Shenzhou 18 (April 25, 2024)
62, 63		Li Guangsu; July 1987	China		Shenzhou 18 (April 25, 2024)
64		Gopichand Thotakura; 1993	India	First space tourist from India	Blue Origin NS-25 (May 19, 2024)
65		Tuva Cihangir Atasever; 1992	Turkey		Galactic 07 (June 8, 2024)
66, 67, 68		Eiman Jahangir; Aug, 1980	United States (Iran)		Blue Origin NS-26 (August 29, 2024)
66, 67, 68		Ephraim Rabin ?	United States (Israel)		Blue Origin NS-26 (August 29, 2024)
66, 67, 68		Nicolina Elrick ?	United Kingdom (Singapore)	First Singaporean permanent resident in space	Blue Origin NS-26 (August 29, 2024)
69, 70		Song Lingdong; August, 1990	China		Shenzhou 19 (October 29, 2024)
69, 70		Wang Haoze; March 1990	China		Shenzhou 19 (October 29, 2024)
71		Chun Wang; 1982	Saint Kitts and Nevis/Malta (China)	First Asian-born in polar retrograde orbit, i.e., to fly over Earth's poles.	Fram2 (March 31, 2025)
72		Amanda Nguyễn; October 1991	United States (South Vietnam)	First Vietnamese American and southeast Asian American woman astronaut.	Blue Origin NS-31 (April 14, 2025)
73, 74		Chen Zhongrui; August, 1990	China		Shenzhou 20/21 (April 24, 2025)
73, 74		Wang Jie; March 1990	China		Shenzhou 20/21 (April 24, 2025)
75		Shubhanshu Shukla; 10 October 1985	India	An Indian Air Force test pilot and ISRO astronaut, first Indian & South Asian to go to the ISS.	Axiom Mission 4 (25 June 2025)
76, 77		H.E. Justin Sun; 30 July 1999	Saint Kitts and Nevis (China)		Blue Origin NS-34 (3 August 2025)
76, 77		Arvinder (Arvi) Singh Bahal; 13 October 1945	United States (India)		Blue Origin NS-34 (3 August 2025)
78		Danna Karagussova ?	Kazakhstan		Blue Origin NS-36 (October 8, 2025)
79, 80		Wu Fei; October, 1993	China		Shenzhou 21/22 (October 31, 2025)
79, 80		Zhang Hongzhang; April 1986	China		Shenzhou 21/22 (October 31, 2025)

== List by country ==
Independent launch capability
Planned human spaceflight program

Country	Astronauts	Maiden flight
Afghanistan	1	29 August 1988
Azerbaijan	1	21 December 1987
China	30	15 October 2003
Georgia	1	7 October 2002
India	6	3 April 1984
Iran	2	18 September 2006
Israel	3	16 January 2003
Japan	13	2 December 1990
Kazakhstan	4	2 October 1991
Kyrgyzstan	1	22 January 1998
Malaysia	1	10 October 2007
Mongolia	1	22 March 1981
Pakistan	1	6 October 2023
Saudi Arabia	3	17 June 1985
Syria	1	22 July 1987
Taiwan	1	29 April 1985
South Korea	1	8 April 2008
Turkey	2	18 January 2024
United Arab Emirates	2	25 September 2019
Vietnam	2	23 July 1980
Singapore	1	25 February 2025

=== Human spaceflight programs ===
Successful
Operational
Planned
Cancelled

Country	Organisation	Program	Destination	Period	Astronauts
China	CNSA	Shuguang	Low Earth orbit	1968–1972	N/A
China	CNSA	China Manned Space Program	Low Earth orbit	1992–present	26
China	CNSA	Tiangong program	Low Earth orbit	1999–present	25
India	ISRO	Indian Human Spaceflight Programme	Low Earth orbit	2006–present	4
Iran	ISRC	Iranian crewed spacecraft	Very low Earth orbit	2015–present	TBD
India	ISRO	Bharatiya Antariksha Station program	Low Earth orbit	2019–present	TBD
Azerbaijan; China; Russia; Thailand; Pakistan; United Arab Emirates; Kazakhstan	ILRS	International Lunar Research Station	Moon	2021–present	TBD

== Other Asian-born astronauts ==
Several Soviet and Russian cosmonauts of Russian ethnicity, and some American astronauts not of Asian ancestry, were born in Asian Russia and other parts of Asia:

- Born in Asian Russia — Dmitri Kondratyev, Vasili Lazarev, Alexei Leonov, Aleksandr Poleshchuk, Nikolai Rukavishnikov, Valery Ryumin, Vitali Sevastyanov, Maksim Surayev, Gherman Titov, Vladimir Titov, Pavel Vinogradov, Boris Volynov.
- Born in Kazakhstan — Yuri Lonchakov, Viktor Patsayev, Vladimir Shatalov, Aleksandr Viktorenko
- Born in Turkmenistan — Oleg Kononenko
- Born in Uzbekistan — Vladimir Dzhanibekov
- Born in China — William Anders, Shannon Lucid
- Born in Taiwan - Kjell N. Lindgren (American by nationality, and half Taiwanese)

== See also ==
- List of Asian American astronauts
