= List of spacewalkers =

People who have performed extravehicular activity

This is a chronological list of astronauts who have engaged in EVA, excluding those on the lunar surface.

As of September 2025, the following 12 countries have conducted spacewalks meeting this criterion: United States (153), Russia (formerly Soviet Union) (75), China (22), Japan (5), Canada (4), France (4), Germany (4), Italy (2), Switzerland (1), Sweden (1), United Kingdom (1), and United Arab Emirates (1). Additionally, 23 women have participated in spacewalks.

== List ==
Order	Image	Country	Name	Spacewalks	# walks
1		USSR (Soviet Union)	Alexei Leonov; 1934–2019	1965: Voskhod 2	1
2		U.S. (United States)	Ed White; 1930–1967	1965: Gemini 4	1
3		U.S. (United States)	Eugene Cernan; 1934–2017	1966: Gemini 9A	1
4		U.S. (United States)	Michael Collins; 1930–2021	1966: Gemini 10 EVA 1 (stand-up), 2 (spacewalk)	2
5		U.S. (United States)	Richard F. Gordon, Jr. 1929–2017	1966: Gemini 11 EVA 1 (spacewalk), 2 (stand-up)	2
6		U.S. (United States)	Buzz Aldrin	1966: Gemini 12 EVA 1 (spacewalk), 2, 3 (stand-ups)	3
7		USSR (Soviet Union)	Yevgeny Khrunov; 1933–2000	1969: Soyuz 5/4	1
8		USSR (Soviet Union)	Aleksei Yeliseyev	1969: Soyuz 5/4	1
9		U.S. (United States)	David Scott	1969: Apollo 9 (stand-up); 1971: Apollo 15 EVA 1 (stand-up)	2
10		U.S. (United States)	Rusty Schweickart	1969: Apollo 9	1
11		U.S. (United States)	James Irwin; 1930–1991	1971: Apollo 15 EVA 2 (stand-up)	1
12		U.S. (United States)	Alfred Worden 1932–2020	1971: Apollo 15 EVA 2	1
13		U.S. (United States)	Charles Moss Duke, Jr.	1972: Apollo 16 (stand-up)	1
14		U.S. (United States)	Ken Mattingly 1936–2023	1972: Apollo 16	1
15		U.S. (United States)	Harrison Schmitt	1972: Apollo 17 (stand-up)	1
16		U.S. (United States)	Ronald Evans; 1933–1990	1972: Apollo 17	1
17		U.S. (United States)	Paul J. Weitz; 1932–2017	1973: Skylab 2 EVA 1, 3	2
18		U.S. (United States)	Pete Conrad; 1930–1999	1973: Skylab 2 EVA 2, 3	2
19		U.S. (United States)	Joseph Kerwin	1973: Skylab 2 EVA 2	1
20		U.S. (United States)	Owen K. Garriott; 1930–2019	1973: Skylab 3 EVA 1, 2, 3	3
21		U.S. (United States)	Jack Lousma	1973: Skylab 3 EVA 1, 2	2
22		U.S. (United States)	Alan Bean; 1932–2018	1973: Skylab 3 EVA 3	1
23		U.S. (United States)	Edward Gibson	1973-4: Skylab 4 EVA 1, 3, 4	3
24		U.S. (United States)	William R. Pogue; 1930–2014	1973: Skylab 4 EVA 1, 2	2
25		U.S. (United States)	Gerald P. Carr 1932–2020	1973-4: Skylab 4 EVA 2, 3, 4	3
26		USSR (Soviet Union)	Yuri Romanenko	1977: Salyut 6 EO-1 EVA 1; 1987: Mir EO-2 EVA 1, 2, 3	4
27		USSR (Soviet Union)	Georgi Grechko; 1931–2017	1977: Salyut 6 EO-1 EVA 1	1
28		USSR (Soviet Union)	Vladimir Kovalyonok	1978: Salyut 6 EO-2 EVA 1 (stand-up)	1
29		USSR (Soviet Union)	Aleksandr Ivanchenkov	1978: Salyut 6 EO-2 EVA 1	1
30		USSR (Soviet Union)	Valery Ryumin 1939–2022	1979: Salyut 6 EO-3 EVA 1	1
31		USSR (Soviet Union)	Vladimir Lyakhov; 1941–2018	1979: Salyut 6 EO-3 EVA 1; 1983: Salyut 7 EO-2 EVA 1, 2	3
32		USSR (Soviet Union)	Anatoly Berezovoy; 1942–2014	1982: Salyut 7 EO-1 EVA 1 (stand-up)	1
33		USSR (Soviet Union)	Valentin Lebedev	1982: Salyut 7 EO-1 EVA 1	1
34		U.S. (United States)	Story Musgrave	1983: STS-6 EVA 1; 1993: STS-61 EVA 1, 3, 5	4
35		U.S. (United States)	Donald H. Peterson; 1933–2018	1983: STS-6 EVA 1	1
36		USSR (Soviet Union)	Aleksandr Pavlovich Aleksandrov	1983: Salyut 7 EO-2 EVA 1, 2	2
37		U.S. (United States)	Bruce McCandless II; 1937–2017	1984: STS-41-B EVA 1, 2	2
38		U.S. (United States)	Robert L. Stewart	1984: STS-41-B EVA 1, 2	2
39		U.S. (United States)	George Nelson	1984: STS-41-C EVA 1, 2	2
40		U.S. (United States)	James van Hoften	1984: STS-41-C EVA 1, 2; 1985: STS-51-I EVA 1, 2	4
41		USSR (Soviet Union)	Leonid Kizim; 1941–2010	1984: Salyut 7 EO-3 EVA 1, 2, 3, 4, 5, 6; 1986: Salyut 7 EO-6 EVA 1, 2	8
42		USSR (Soviet Union)	Vladimir Solovyov	1984: Salyut 7 EO-3 EVA 1, 2, 3, 4, 5, 6; 1986: Salyut 7 EO-6 EVA 1, 2	8
43		USSR (Soviet Union)	Svetlana Savitskaya	1984: Salyut 7 EP-4 EVA 1	1
44		USSR (Soviet Union)	Vladimir Dzhanibekov	1984: Salyut 7 EP-4 EVA 1; 1985: Salyut 7 EO-4 EVA 1	2
45		U.S. (United States)	David Leestma	1984: STS-41-G EVA 1	1
46		U.S. (United States)	Kathryn Dwyer Sullivan	1984: STS-41-G EVA 1	1
47		U.S. (United States)	Joseph P. Allen	1984: STS-51-A EVA 1, 2	2
48		U.S. (United States)	Dale Gardner; 1948–2014	1984: STS-51-A EVA 1, 2	2
49		U.S. (United States)	Jeffrey A. Hoffman	1985: STS-51-D EVA 1; 1993: STS-61 EVA 1, 3, 5	4
50		U.S. (United States)	S. David Griggs; 1939–1989	1985: STS-51-D EVA 1	1
51		USSR (Soviet Union)	Viktor Savinykh	1985: Salyut 7 EO-4 EVA 1	1
52		U.S. (United States)	William Frederick Fisher	1985: STS-51-I EVA 1, 2	2
53		U.S. (United States)	Jerry L. Ross	1985: STS-61-B EVA 1, 2; 1991: STS-37 EVA 1, 2; 1998: STS-88 EVA 1, 2, 3; 2002: STS-110 EVA 2, 4	9
54		U.S. (United States)	Sherwood Spring	1985: STS-61-B EVA 1, 2	2
55		USSR (Soviet Union)	Aleksandr Laveykin	1987: Mir EO-2 EVA 1, 2, 3	3
56		USSR (Soviet Union); Russia	Vladimir Titov	1988: Mir EO-3 EVA 1, 2, 3; 1997: STS-86 EVA 1	4
57		USSR (Soviet Union)	Musa Manarov	1988: Mir EO-3 EVA 1, 2, 3; 1991: Mir EO-8 EVA 1, 2, 3, 4	7
58		USSR (Soviet Union); Russia	Aleksandr Volkov	1988: Mir EO-4 EVA 1; 1992: Mir EO-10 EVA 1	2
59		France	Jean-Loup Chrétien	1988: Mir EO-4 EVA 1	1
60		USSR (Soviet Union); Russia	Aleksandr Viktorenko 1947–2023	1990: Mir EO-5 EVA 1, 2, 3, 4, 5; 1992: Mir EO-11 EVA 1	6
61		USSR (Soviet Union); Russia	Aleksandr Serebrov; 1944–2013	1990: Mir EO-5 EVA 1, 2, 3, 4, 5; 1993: Mir EO-14 EVA 1, 2, 3, 4, 5	10
62		USSR (Soviet Union); Russia	Anatoly Solovyev	1990: Mir EO-6 EVA 1, 2; 1992: Mir EO-12 EVA 1, 2, 3, 4; 1995: Mir EO-19 EVA 1, 2, 3; 1997: Mir EO-24 EVA 1, 2, 3, 4, 5, 6, 7	16
63		USSR (Soviet Union)	Aleksandr Balandin	1990: Mir EO-6 EVA 1, 2	2
64		USSR (Soviet Union); Russia	Gennadi Manakov; 1950–2019	1990: Mir EO-7 EVA 1; 1993: Mir EO-13 EVA 1, 2	3
65		USSR (Soviet Union); Russia	Gennadi Strekalov; 1940–2004	1990: Mir EO-7 EVA 1; 1995: Mir EO-18 EVA 1, 2, 3, 4, 5	6
66		USSR (Soviet Union); Russia	Viktor Mikhaylovich Afanasyev	1991: Mir EO-8 EVA 1, 2, 3, 4; 1999: Mir EO-27 EVA 1, 2, 3	7
67		U.S. (United States)	Jerome Apt	1991: STS-37 EVA 1, 2	2
68		USSR (Soviet Union)	Anatoly Artsebarsky	1991: Mir EO-9 EVA 1, 2, 3, 4, 5, 6	6
69		USSR (Soviet Union); Russia	Sergei Krikalev	1991: Mir EO-9 EVA 1, 2, 3, 4, 5, 6; 1992: Mir EO-10 EVA 1; 2005: Expedition 11 EVA 1	8
70		U.S. (United States)	Pierre Thuot	1992: STS-49 EVA 1, 2, 3	3
71		U.S. (United States)	Richard Hieb	1992: STS-49 EVA 1, 2, 3	3
72		U.S. (United States)	Thomas Akers	1992: STS-49 EVA 3, 4; 1993: STS-61 EVA 2, 4	4
73		U.S. (United States)	Kathryn C. Thornton	1992: STS-49 EVA 4; 1993: STS-61 EVA 2, 4	3
74		Russia	Aleksandr Kaleri	1992: Mir EO-11 EVA 1; 1996: Mir EO-22 EVA 1, 2; 2000: Mir EO-28 EVA 1; 2004: Expedition 8 EVA 1	5
75		Russia	Sergei Avdeyev	1992: Mir EO-12 EVA 1, 2, 3, 4; 1995: Mir EO-20 EVA 1, 2; 1998: Mir EO-26 EVA 1, 2; 1999: Mir EO-27 EVA 2, 3	10
76		U.S. (United States)	Gregory J. Harbaugh	1993: STS-54 EVA 1; 1997: STS-82 EVA 2, 4	3
77		U.S. (United States)	Mario Runco	1993: STS-54 EVA 1	1
78		Russia	Aleksandr Poleshchuk	1993: Mir EO-13 EVA 1, 2	2
79		U.S. (United States)	G. David Low; 1956–2008	1993: STS-57 EVA 1	1
80		U.S. (United States)	Peter Wisoff	1993: STS-57 EVA 1; 2000: STS-92 EVA 2, 4	3
81		Russia	Vasili Tsibliyev	1993: Mir EO-14 EVA 1, 2, 3, 4, 5; 1997: Mir EO-23 EVA 1	6
82		U.S. (United States)	James H. Newman	1993: STS-51 EVA 1; 1998: STS-88 EVA 1, 2, 3; 2002: STS-109 EVA 2, 4	6
83		U.S. (United States)	Carl E. Walz	1993: STS-51 EVA 1; 2002: Expedition 4 EVA 1, 3	3
84		Russia	Yuri Malenchenko	1994: Mir EO-16 EVA 1, 2; 2000: STS-106 EVA 1; 2007: Expedition 16 EVA 1; 2012: Expedition 32 EVA 1; 2016: Expedition 46 EVA 3	6
85		Russia	Talgat Musabayev	1994: Mir EO-16 EVA 1, 2; 1998: Mir EO-25 EVA 1, 2, 3, 4, 5	7
86		U.S. (United States)	Mark C. Lee	1994: STS-64 EVA 1; 1997: STS-82 EVA 1, 3, 5	4
87		U.S. (United States)	Carl J. Meade	1994: STS-64 EVA 1	1
88		U.S. (United States)	Michael Foale	1995: STS-63 EVA 1; 1997: Mir EO-24 EVA 2; 1999: STS-103 EVA 2; 2004: Expedition 8 EVA 1	4
89		U.S. (United States)	Bernard Harris	1995: STS-63 EVA 1	1
90		Russia	Vladimir N. Dezhurov	1995: Mir EO-18 EVA 1, 2, 3, 4, 5; 2001: Expedition 3 EVA 1, 2, 3, 4	9
91		Russia	Nikolai Budarin	1995: Mir EO-19 EVA 1, 2, 3; 1998: Mir EO-25 EVA 1, 2, 3, 4, 5	8
92		U.S. (United States)	James S. Voss	1995: STS-69 EVA 1; 2000: STS-101 EVA 1; 2001: STS-102 EVA 1; 2001: Expedition 2 EVA 1	4
93		U.S. (United States)	Michael Gernhardt	1995: STS-69 EVA 1; 2001: STS-104 EVA 1, 2, 3	4
94		Germany	Thomas Reiter	1995-6: Mir EO-20 EVA 1, 3; 2006: Expedition 13 EVA 2	3
95		Russia	Yuri Gidzenko	1995-6: Mir EO-20 EVA 2, 3	2
96		U.S. (United States)	Leroy Chiao	1996: STS-72 EVA 1, 2; 2000: STS-92 EVA 1, 3; 2005: Expedition 10 EVA 1, 2	6
97		U.S. (United States)	Daniel T. Barry	1996: STS-72 EVA 1; 1999: STS-96 EVA 1; 2001: STS-105 EVA 1, 2	4
98		U.S. (United States)	Winston E. Scott	1996: STS-72 EVA 2; 1997: STS-87 EVA 1, 2	3
99		Russia	Yuri Onufriyenko	1996: Mir EO-21 EVA 1, 2, 3, 4, 5, 6; 2002: Expedition 4 EVA 1, 2	8
100		Russia	Yuri Usachov	1996: Mir EO-21 EVA 1, 2, 3, 4, 5, 6; 2001: Expedition 2 EVA 1	7
101		U.S. (United States)	Michael R. Clifford	1996: STS-76 EVA 1	1
102		U.S. (United States)	Linda M. Godwin	1996: STS-76 EVA 1; 2001: STS-108 EVA 1	2
103		Russia	Valery Korzun	1996: Mir EO-22 EVA 1, 2; 2002: Expedition 5 EVA 1, 2	4
104		U.S. (United States)	Steven Smith	1997: STS-82 EVA 1, 3, 5; 1999: STS-103 EVA 1, 3; 2002: STS-110 EVA 1, 3	7
105		U.S. (United States)	Joseph R. Tanner	1997: STS-82 EVA 2, 4; 2000: STS-97 EVA 1, 2, 3; 2006: STS-115 EVA 1, 3	7
106		U.S. (United States)	Jerry M. Linenger	1997: Mir EO-23 EVA 1	1
107		Russia	Pavel Vinogradov	1997-8: Mir EO-24 EVA 1, 3, 4, 5, 6; 2006: Expedition 13 EVA 1; 2013: Expedition 35 EVA 1	7
108		U.S. (United States)	Scott E. Parazynski	1997: STS-86 EVA 1; 2001: STS-100 EVA 1, 2; 2007: STS-120 EVA 1, 2, 3, 4	7
109		Japan	Takao Doi	1997: STS-87 EVA 1, 2	2
110		U.S. (United States)	David Wolf	1998: Mir EO-24 EVA 7; 2002: STS-112 EVA 1, 2, 3; 2009: STS-127 EVA 1, 2, 3	7
111		Russia	Gennady Padalka	1998: Mir EO-26 EVA 1, 2; 2004: Expedition 9 EVA 1, 2, 3, 4; 2009: Expedition 20 EVA 1, 2; 2012: Expedition 32 EVA 1; 2015: Expedition 44 EVA 1	10
112		France	Jean-Pierre Haigneré	1999: Mir EO-27 EVA 1	1
113		U.S. (United States)	Tamara E. Jernigan	1999: STS-96 EVA 1	1
114		U.S. (United States)	John Grunsfeld	1999: STS-103 EVA 1, 3; 2002: STS-109 EVA 1, 3, 5; 2009: STS-125 EVA 1, 3, 5	8
115		Switzerland	Claude Nicollier	1999: STS-103 EVA 2	1
116		Russia	Sergei Zalyotin	2000: Mir EO-28 EVA 1	1
117		U.S. (United States)	Jeffrey Williams	2000: STS-101 EVA 1; 2006: Expedition 13 EVA 1, 2; 2016: Expedition 48 EVA 1, 2	5
118		U.S. (United States)	Edward Lu	2000: STS-106 EVA 1	1
119		U.S. (United States)	William S. McArthur	2000: STS-92 EVA 1, 3; 2005-6 Expedition 12 EVA 1, 2	4
120		U.S. (United States)	Michael Lopez-Alegria	2000: STS-92 EVA 2, 4; 2002: STS-113 EVA 1, 2, 3; 2006-7 Expedition 14 EVA 1, 2, 3, 4, 5	10
121		U.S. (United States)	Carlos I. Noriega	2000: STS-97 EVA 1, 2, 3	3
122		U.S. (United States)	Thomas D. Jones	2001: STS-98 EVA 1, 2, 3	3
123		U.S. (United States)	Robert Curbeam	2001: STS-98 EVA 1, 2, 3; 2006: STS-116 EVA 1, 2, 3, 4	7
124		U.S. (United States)	Susan Helms	2001: STS-102 EVA 1	1
125		U.S. (United States)	Andy Thomas	2001: STS-102 EVA 2	1
126		U.S. (United States)	Paul W. Richards	2001: STS-102 EVA 2	1
127		Canada	Chris Hadfield	2001: STS-100 EVA 1, 2	2
128		U.S. (United States)	James F. Reilly	2001: STS-104 EVA 1, 2, 3; 2007: STS-117 EVA 1, 3	5
129		U.S. (United States)	Patrick G. Forrester	2001: STS-105 EVA 1, 2; 2007: STS-117 EVA 2, 4	4
130		Russia	Mikhail Tyurin	2001: Expedition 3 EVA 1, 2, 4; 2006-7: Expedition 14 EVA 1, 5	5
131		U.S. (United States)	Frank L. Culbertson, Jr.	2001: Expedition 3 EVA 3	1
132		U.S. (United States)	Daniel M. Tani	2001: STS-108 EVA 1; 2007: STS-120 EVA 2; 2007-8: Expedition 16 EVA 2, 3, 4, 5	6
133		U.S. (United States)	Daniel W. Bursch	2002: Expedition 4 EVA 2, 3	2
134		U.S. (United States)	Richard M. Linnehan	2002: STS-109 EVA 1, 3, 5; 2008: STS-123 EVA 1, 2, 3	6
135		U.S. (United States)	Michael J. Massimino	2002: STS-109 EVA 2, 4; 2009: STS-125 EVA 2, 4	4
136		U.S. (United States)	Rex J. Walheim	2002: STS-110 EVA 1, 3; 2008: STS-122 EVA 1, 2, 3	5
137		U.S. (United States)	Lee Morin	2002: STS-110 EVA 2, 4	2
138		Costa Rica; U.S. (United States)	Franklin Chang-Diaz	2002: STS-111 EVA 1, 2, 3	3
139		France	Philippe Perrin	2002: STS-111 EVA 1, 2, 3	3
140		U.S. (United States)	Peggy Whitson	2002: Expedition 5 EVA 1; 2007-8: Expedition 16 EVA 1, 2, 3, 4, 5; 2017: Expedition 50 EVA 1, 4; 2017: Expedition 51 EVA 1, 2	10
141		Russia	Sergei Treshchov	2002: Expedition 5 EVA 2	1
142		U.S. (United States)	Piers Sellers; 1955–2016	2002: STS-112 EVA 1, 2, 3; 2006: STS-121 EVA 1, 2, 3	6
143		U.S. (United States)	John Herrington	2002: STS-113 EVA 1, 2, 3	3
144		U.S. (United States)	Ken Bowersox	2003: Expedition 6 EVA 1, 2	2
145		U.S. (United States)	Donald Pettit	2003: Expedition 6 EVA 1, 2	2
146		U.S. (United States)	Michael Fincke	2004: Expedition 9 EVA 1, 2, 3, 4; 2008-9: Expedition 18 EVA 1, 2; 2011: STS-134 EVA 2, 3, 4	9
147		Russia	Salizhan Sharipov	2005: Expedition 10 EVA 1, 2	2
148		Japan	Soichi Noguchi	2005: STS-114 EVA 1, 2, 3; 2021: Expedition 64 EVA 5	4
149		U.S. (United States)	Stephen Robinson	2005: STS-114 EVA 1, 2, 3	3
150		U.S. (United States)	John L. Phillips	2005: Expedition 11 EVA 1	1
151		Russia	Valery Tokarev	2005-6: Expedition 12 EVA 1, 2	2
152		U.S. (United States)	Michael E. Fossum	2006: STS-121 EVA 1, 2, 3; 2008: STS-124 EVA 1, 2, 3; 2011: Expedition 28 EVA 1	7
153		U.S. (United States)	Heidemarie Stefanyshyn-Piper	2006: STS-115 EVA 1, 3; 2008: STS-126 EVA 1, 2, 3	5
154		U.S. (United States)	Daniel C. Burbank	2006: STS-115 EVA 2	1
155		Canada	Steven MacLean	2006: STS-115 EVA 2	1
156		Sweden	Christer Fuglesang	2006: STS-116 EVA 1, 2, 4; 2009: STS-128 EVA 2, 3	5
157		U.S. (United States)	Sunita Williams	2006: STS-116 EVA 3; 2007: Expedition 14 EVA 2, 3, 4; 2012: Expedition 32 EVA 2, 3, Expedition 33 EVA 1; 2025: Expedition 72 EVA 2	9
158		Russia	Oleg Kotov	2007: Expedition 15 EVA 1, 2; 2010: Expedition 22 EVA 1; 2013: Expedition 37 EVA 1; 2014: Expedition 38 EVA 4	5
159		Russia	Fyodor Yurchikhin	2007: Expedition 15 EVA 1, 2, 3; 2010: Expedition 24 EVA 1; 2010: Expedition 25 EVA 1; 2013: Expedition 36 EVA 1, 4, 5; 2017: Expedition 52 EVA 1	9
160		U.S. (United States)	John D. Olivas	2007: STS-117 EVA 1, 3; 2009: STS-128 EVA 1, 2, 3	5
161		U.S. (United States)	Steven Swanson	2007: STS-117 EVA 2, 4; 2009: STS-119 EVA 1, 2; 2014: Expedition 39 EVA 1	5
162		U.S. (United States)	Clayton Anderson	2007: Expedition 15 EVA 3; 2007: STS-118 EVA 3, 4; 2010: STS-131 EVA 1, 2, 3	6
163		U.S. (United States)	Richard Mastracchio	2007: STS-118 EVA 1, 2, 3; 2010: STS-131 EVA 1, 2, 3; 2013: Expedition 38 EVA 1, 2; 2014: Expedition 39 EVA 1	9
164		Canada	Dafydd Williams	2007: STS-118 EVA 1, 2, 4	3
165		U.S. (United States)	Douglas H. Wheelock	2007: STS-120 EVA 1, 3, 4; 2010: Expedition 24 EVA 2, 3, 4	6
166		U.S. (United States)	Stanley G. Love	2008: STS-122 EVA 1, 3	2
167		Germany	Hans Schlegel	2008: STS-122 EVA 2	1
168		U.S. (United States)	Garrett Reisman	2008: STS-123 EVA 1; 2010: STS-132 EVA 1, 3	3
169		U.S. (United States)	Michael Foreman	2008: STS-123 EVA 2, 4, 5; 2009: STS-129 EVA 1, 2	5
170		U.S. (United States)	Robert L. Behnken	2008: STS-123 EVA 3, 4, 5; 2010: STS-130 EVA 1, 2, 3; 2020: Expedition 63 EVA 1, 2, 3, 4	10
171		U.S. (United States)	Ronald J. Garan, Jr.	2008: STS-124 EVA 1, 2, 3; 2011: Expedition 28 EVA 1	4
172		Russia	Sergei Volkov	2008: Expedition 17 EVA 1, 2; 2011: Expedition 28 EVA 2; 2016: Expedition 46 EVA 3	4
173		Russia	Oleg Kononenko	2008: Expedition 17 EVA 1, 2; 2012: Expedition 30 EVA 1; 2018: Expedition 57 EVA 1; 2019: Expedition 59 EVA 4; 2023: Expedition 70 EVA 1; 2024: Expedition 71 EVA 1	7
174		China	Zhai Zhigang	2008: Shenzhou 7; 2021: Shenzhou 13 EVA 1, 2	3
175		China	Liu Boming	2008: Shenzhou 7 (stand-up); 2021: Shenzhou 12 EVA 1, 2	3
176		U.S. (United States)	Stephen G. Bowen	2008: STS-126 EVA 1, 3, 4; 2010: STS-132 EVA 1, 2; 2011: STS-133 EVA 1, 2; 2023: Expedition 69 EVA 2, 5, 6	10
177		U.S. (United States)	Robert S. Kimbrough	2008: STS-126 EVA 2, 4; 2017: Expedition 50 EVA 1, 2; 2021: Expedition 65 EVA 2, 3, 4	7
178		Russia	Yuri Lonchakov	2008-9: Expedition 18 EVA 1, 2	2
179		U.S. (United States)	Richard R. Arnold	2009: STS-119 EVA 1, 3; 2018: Expedition 55 EVA 1, 2, 3	5
180		U.S. (United States)	Joseph M. Acaba	2009: STS-119 EVA 2, 3; 2017: Expedition 53 EVA 3	3
181		U.S. (United States)	Andrew J. Feustel	2009: STS-125 EVA 1, 3, 5; 2011: STS-134 EVA 1, 2, 3; 2018: Expedition 55 EVA 1, 2, 3	9
182		U.S. (United States)	Michael T. Good	2009: STS-125 EVA 2, 4; 2010: STS-132 EVA 2, 3	4
183		U.S. (United States)	Michael R. Barratt	2009: Expedition 20 EVA 1, 2	2
184		U.S. (United States)	Timothy L. Kopra	2009: STS-127 EVA 1; 2015-16: Expedition 46 EVA 1, 2	3
185		U.S. (United States)	Thomas Marshburn	2009: STS-127 EVA 2, 4, 5; 2013: Expedition 35 EVA 2; 2021: Expedition 66 EVA 1	5
186		U.S. (United States)	Christopher Cassidy	2009: STS-127 EVA 3, 4, 5; 2013: Expedition 35 EVA 2, Expedition 36 EVA 2, 3; 2020: Expedition 63 EVA 1, 2, 3, 4	10
187		U.S. (United States)	Nicole P. Stott	2009: STS-128 EVA 1	1
188		U.S. (United States)	Robert Satcher	2009: STS-129 EVA 1, 3	2
189		U.S. (United States)	Randolph Bresnik	2009: STS-129 EVA 2, 3; 2017: Expedition 53 EVA 1, 2, 3	5
190		Russia	Maksim Surayev	2010: Expedition 22 EVA 1; 2014: Expedition 41 EVA 3	2
191		U.S. (United States)	Nicholas Patrick	2010: STS-130 EVA 1, 2, 3	3
192		Russia	Mikhail Korniyenko	2010: Expedition 24 EVA 1; 2015: Expedition 44 EVA 1	2
193		U.S. (United States)	Tracy Caldwell Dyson	2010: Expedition 24 EVA 2, 3, 4	3
194		Russia	Oleg Skripochka	2010-11: Expedition 25 EVA 1, Expedition 26 EVA 1, 2	3
195		Russia	Dmitri Kondratyev	2011: Expedition 26 EVA 1, 2	2
196		U.S. (United States)	B. Alvin Drew	2011: STS-133 EVA 1, 2	2
197		U.S. (United States)	Gregory Chamitoff	2011: STS-134 EVA 1, 4	2
198		Russia	Aleksandr Samokutyayev	2011: Expedition 28 EVA 2; 2014: Expedition 41 EVA 3	2
199		Russia	Anton Shkaplerov	2012: Expedition 30 EVA 1; 2018: Expedition 54 EVA 2; 2022: Expedition 66 EVA 2	3
200		Japan	Akihiko Hoshide	2012: Expedition 32 EVA 2, 3, Expedition 33 EVA 1; 2021: Expedition 65 EVA 7	4
201		Russia	Roman Romanenko	2013: Expedition 35 EVA 1	1
202		Russia	Alexander Misurkin	2013: Expedition 36 EVA 1, 4, 5; 2018: Expedition 54 EVA 2	4
203		Italy	Luca Parmitano	2013: Expedition 36 EVA 2, 3; 2019-20: Expedition 61 EVA 4, 5, 6, 9	6
204		Russia	Sergei Ryazanski	2013: Expedition 37 EVA 1; 2014: Expedition 38 EVA 3, 4; 2017: Expedition 52 EVA 1	4
205		U.S. (United States)	Michael S. Hopkins	2013: Expedition 38 EVA 1, 2; 2021: Expedition 64 EVA 2, 3, 6	5
206		Russia	Alexander Skvortsov	2014: Expedition 40 EVA 1, 2	2
207		Russia	Oleg Artemyev	2014: Expedition 40 EVA 1, 2; 2018: Expedition 56 EVA 1; 2022: Expedition 67 EVA 1, 2, 3, 4, 5	8
208		U.S. (United States)	Reid Wiseman	2014: Expedition 41 EVA 1, 2	2
209		Germany	Alexander Gerst	2014: Expedition 41 EVA 1	1
210		U.S. (United States)	Butch Wilmore	2014-15: Expedition 41 EVA 2, Expedition 42 EVA 1, 2, 3	4
211		U.S. (United States)	Terry Virts	2015: Expedition 42 EVA 1	1
212		U.S. (United States)	Scott Kelly	2015: Expedition 45 EVA 1, 2, Expedition 46 EVA 1	3
213		U.S. (United States)	Kjell Lindgren	2015: Expedition 45 EVA 1, 2	2
214		U.K. (United Kingdom)	Tim Peake	2016: Expedition 46 EVA 2	1
215		U.S. (United States)	Kathleen Rubins	2016: Expedition 48 EVA 1, 2; 2021: Expedition 64 EVA 4	3
216		France	Thomas Pesquet	2017: Expedition 50 EVA 2, 3; 2021: Expedition 65 EVA 2, 3, 4, 7	6
217		U.S. (United States)	Jack D. Fischer	2017: Expedition 51 EVA 1, 2	2
218		U.S. (United States)	Mark T. Vande Hei	2017: Expedition 53 EVA 1, 2, Expedition 54 EVA 1, 3	4
219		U.S. (United States)	Scott D. Tingle	2018: Expedition 54 EVA 1	1
220		Japan	Norishige Kanai	2018: Expedition 54 EVA 3	1
221		Russia	Sergei Prokopyev	2018: Expedition 56 EVA 1, Expedition 57 EVA 1; 2022: Expedition 68 EVA 2; 2023: Expedition 69 EVA 1, 3, 4, 7, 8	8
222		U.S. (United States)	Anne C. McClain	2019: Expedition 59 EVA 1, 3	2
223		U.S. (United States)	Tyler N. Hague	2019: Expedition 59 EVA 1, 2, Expedition 60 EVA 1 2025: Expedition 72 EVA 2	4
224		U.S. (United States)	Christina H. Koch	2019-20: Expedition 59 EVA 2, Expedition 61 EVA 1, 2, 3, 7, 8	6
225		Canada	David Saint-Jacques	2019: Expedition 59 EVA 3	1
226		Russia	Aleksey Ovchinin	2019: Expedition 59 EVA 4; 2024: Expedition 72 EVA 1	2
227		U.S. (United States)	Andrew R. Morgan	2019-20: Expedition 60 EVA 1, Expedition 61 EVA 1, 2, 4, 5, 6, 9	7
228		U.S. (United States)	Jessica Meir	2019-20: Expedition 61 EVA 3, 7, 8	3
229		Russia	Sergey Ryzhikov	2020: Expedition 64 EVA 1	1
230		Russia	Sergey Kud-Sverchkov	2020: Expedition 64 EVA 1	1
231		U.S. (United States)	Victor Glover	2021: Expedition 64 EVA 2, 3, 4, 6	4
232		Russia	Oleg Novitsky	2021: Expedition 65 EVA 1, 5, 6	3
233		Russia	Pyotr Dubrov	2021-2022: Expedition 65 EVA 1, 5, 6, Expedition 66 EVA 2	4
234		China	Tang Hongbo	2021: Shenzhou 12 EVA 1; 2023: Shenzhou 17 EVA 1; 2024: Shenzhou 17 EVA 2	3
235		China	Nie Haisheng	2021: Shenzhou 12 EVA 2	1
236		China	Wang Yaping	2021: Shenzhou 13 EVA 1	1
237		U.S. (United States)	Kayla Barron	2021: Expedition 66 EVA 1, 3	2
238		China	Ye Guangfu	2021: Shenzhou 13 EVA 2; 2024: Shenzhou 18 EVA 1, 2	3
239		U.S. (United States)	Raja Chari	2022: Expedition 66 EVA 3, 4	2
240		Germany	Matthias Maurer	2022: Expedition 66 EVA 4	1
241		Russia	Denis Matveev	2022: Expedition 67 EVA 1, 2, 4, 5	4
242		Italy	Samantha Cristoforetti	2022: Expedition 67 EVA 3	1
243		China	Chen Dong	2022: Shenzhou 14 EVA 1, 2, 3; 2025: Shenzhou 20 EVA 1, 2, 3	6
244		China	Liu Yang	2022: Shenzhou 14 EVA 1	1
245		China	Cai Xuzhe	2022: Shenzhou 14 EVA 2, 3; 2024: Shenzhou 19 EVA 1; 2025: Shenzhou 19 EVA 2, 3	5
246		U.S. (United States)	Josh A. Cassada	2022: Expedition 68 EVA 1, 3, 4	3
247		U.S. (United States)	Francisco Rubio	2022: Expedition 68 EVA 1, 3, 4	3
248		Russia	Dmitry Petelin	2022: Expedition 68 EVA 2; 2023: Expedition 69 EVA 1, 3, 4, 7, 8	6
249		U.S. (United States)	Nicole Mann	2023: Expedition 68 EVA 5, 6	2
250		Japan	Koichi Wakata	2023: Expedition 68 EVA 5, 6	2
251		China	Fei Junlong	2023: Shenzhou 15 EVA 1, 2, 3, 4	4
252		China	Zhang Lu	2023: Shenzhou 15 EVA 1, 2, 3, 4; 2025: Shenzhou 21 EVA 1; 2026: Shenzhou 21 EVA 2	6
253		United Arab Emirates	Sultan Al Neyadi	2023: Expedition 69 EVA 1	1
254		U.S. (United States)	Warren Hoburg	2023: Expedition 69 EVA 5, 6	2
255		China	Jing Haipeng	2023: Shenzhou 16 EVA 1	1
256		China	Zhu Yangzhu	2023: Shenzhou 16 EVA 1	1
257		Russia	Nikolai Chub	2023: Expedition 70 EVA 1; 2024: Expedition 71 EVA 1	2
258		U.S. (United States)	Jasmin Moghbeli	2023: Expedition 70 EVA 2	1
259		U.S. (United States)	Loral O'Hara	2023: Expedition 70 EVA 2	1
260		China	Tang Shengjie	2023: Shenzhou 17 EVA 1	1
261		China	Jiang Xinlin	2024: Shenzhou 17 EVA 2	1
262		China	Li Guangsu	2024: Shenzhou 18 EVA 1	1
263		China	Li Cong	2024: Shenzhou 18 EVA 2	1
264		U.S. (United States)	Jared Isaacman	2024: Polaris Dawn (stand-up)	1
265		U.S. (United States)	Sarah Gillis	2024: Polaris Dawn (stand-up)	1
266		China	Song Lingdong	2024: Shenzhou 19 EVA 1; 2025: Shenzhou 19 EVA 2, 3	3
267		Russia	Ivan Vagner	2024: Expedition 72 EVA 1	1
268		U.S. (United States)	Nichole Ayers	2025: Expedition 73 EVA 1	1
269		China	Chen Zhongrui	2025: Shenzhou 20 EVA 1, 2, 4	3
270		China	Wang Jie	2025: Shenzhou 20 EVA 3, 4	2
271		China	Wu Fei	2025: Shenzhou 21 EVA 1; 2026: Shenzhou 21 EVA 2	2

== See also ==
- List of cumulative spacewalk records
- List of spacewalks and moonwalks 1965–1999
- List of spacewalks 2000–2014
- List of spacewalks 2015—2024
- List of spacewalks since 2025
