= Tang Hongbo =

Chinese taikonaut (born 1975)

- 汤洪波
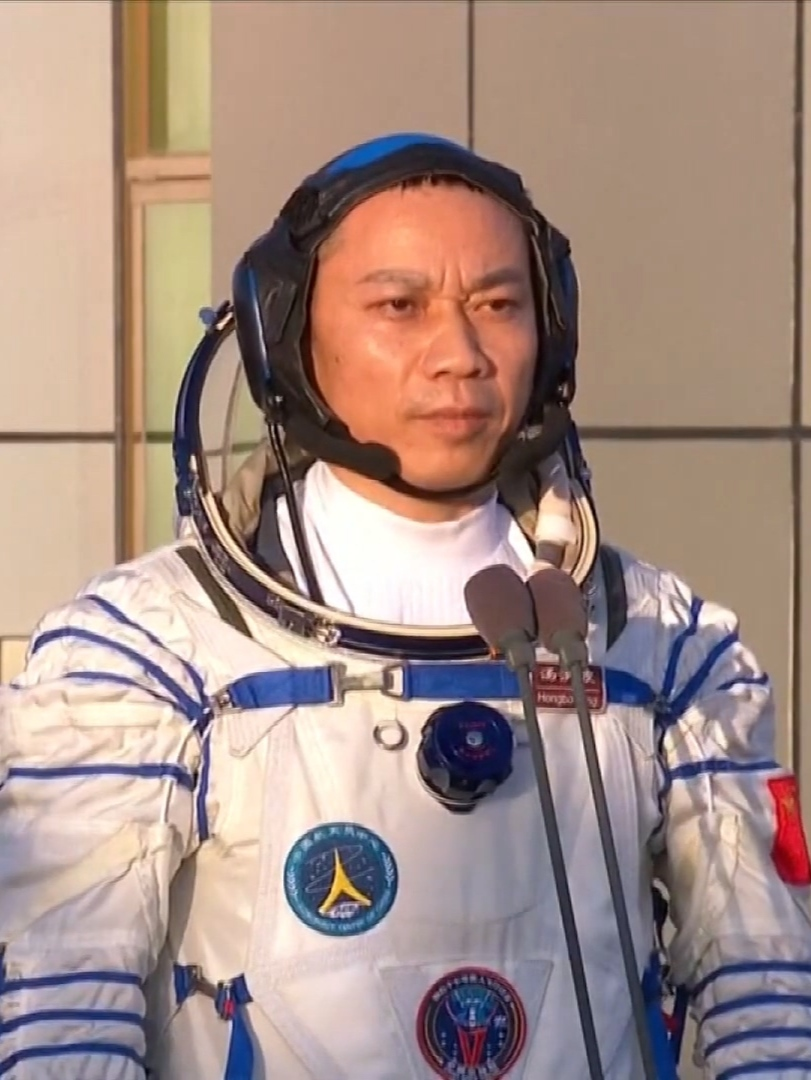
- Tang in 2023
- Born: October 1975 (age 50–51); Xiangtan County, Hunan, China
- Education: PLA Air Force Changchun Flight College
- Space career

PLAAC astronaut
- Previous occupation: Fighter pilot, People's Liberation Army Air Force
- Status: Active
- Rank: Senior colonel, People's Liberation Army Strategic Support Force
- Time in space: 279 days, 10 hours and 43 minutes
- Selection: Chinese Group 2 (2010)
- Total EVAs: 3
- Total EVA time: 22 hours, 3 minutes
- Missions: Shenzhou 12; Shenzhou 17

Chinese name
- Simplified Chinese: 汤洪波
- Traditional Chinese: 湯洪波
Transcriptions
Standard Mandarin
- Hanyu Pinyin: Tāng Hóngbō

Tang Hongbo (Chinese: 汤洪波; pinyin: Tāng Hóngbō; born October 1975) is a Chinese fighter pilot and People's Liberation Army Astronaut Corps (PLAAC) taikonaut. He flew on his first spaceflight to the Tiangong space station as a part of the Shenzhou 12 mission, the first to visit the station. He was the commander of the Shenzhou 17 mission, making him the first taikonaut to visit Tiangong twice.

As of May 2024, Tang had spent 279 days in space and held the Chinese record for longest spaceflight duration until surpassed by Ye Guangfu later the same year.

== Biography ==
He was born into a family of farming background in the town of Yunhuqiao, Xiangtan County, Hunan in October 1975. He has a younger brother.

Awarded the rank Senior Colonel, he joined the PLA Air Force in September 1995. Where he was promoted to the post of group commander at a fighter jet regiment. He was selected for the second group of astronauts at Nie's division in May 2010 then was chosen in May 2016 as an alternate for the two-member crew of the Shenzhou 11 mission.

A pilot in the People's Liberation Army Air Force, he was selected into the People's Liberation Army Astronaut Corps in 2010. He was part of the backup crew for Shenzhou 11, and flew as a System Operator on Shenzhou 12, the first crewed mission to the Tiangong space station.

On 4 July 2021, Tang and Liu Boming, another crew member of Shenzhou 12, completed the first extravehicular activity of Tiangong space station.

Later he flew again to Tiangong on the second mission and first as the Commander on Shenzhou 17 with Jiang Xinlin and Tang Shengjie on 26 October 2023. On 21 December 2023 and 2 March 2024, he carried out his second and third spacewalks, which lasted for 7 hours and 25 minutes and 7 hours and 52 minutes, respectively.

== See also ==
- List of Chinese astronauts
- Tiangong space station
