= Kelly Latimer =

American astronaut

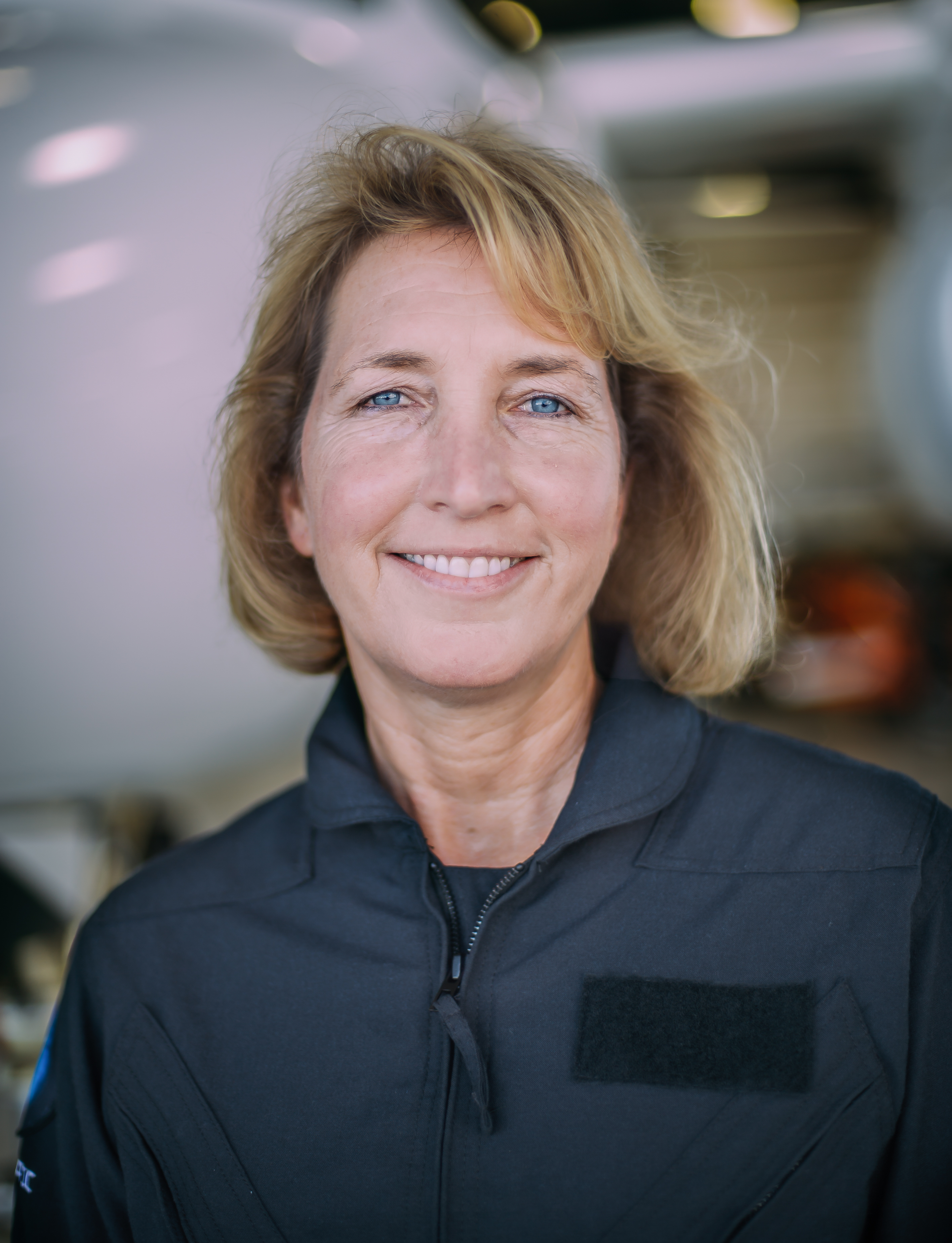
- Latimer in 2016
- Education: United States Air Force Academy; George Washington University
- Employer(s): Virgin Galactic; Virgin Orbit
- Space career
- Time in space: 44 min, 21s
- Missions: Galactic 02, Galactic 04, Galactic 05

Kelly Latimer is a combat veteran, retired United States Air Force lieutenant colonel, and commercial spaceship pilot. She was the first female research pilot to join the NASA Armstrong Flight Research Center. She works with Virgin Galactic and Virgin Orbit, and was the latter's pilot in command for their first rocket launch in January 2021. Latimer flew the T-38, T-34, Lockheed C-141 Starlifter, Boeing C-17, 747 Shuttle Carrier Aircraft and the Stratospheric Observatory for Infrared Astronomy 747SP. On August 10, 2023 Latimer co-piloted VSS Unity along with Frederick W. Sturckow as commercial astronaut pilot of Virgin's Galactic 02.

== Early life and education ==
Latimer attended the United States Air Force Academy. In her freshman year she spent her summers learning how to fly gliders, after which she said "I knew I would fly for the rest of my life". After graduating the Air Force Academy, she applied to NASA Armstrong but was not selected. She graduated with a bachelor's degree in astronautical engineering from the Air Force Academy in 1987 and a master's degree in astronautics from George Washington University in 1988.

== Career ==
Latimer became a pilot with the United States Air Force. She was a lieutenant colonel. After September 11, 2001, she knew she wanted to get involved with the fight, returning to the 4th Airlift Squadron, McChord Field, for operational and deployed flying. She was part of Operation Enduring Freedom and Operation Iraqi Freedom, and flew more than 90 combat sorties. She was commander of the 418th Flight Test Squadron. She was Senior United States Air Force Advisor to the Iraqi Air Force and the reconnaissance squadron. She retired from the Air Force in 2007.

Latimer was the first woman research test pilot hired by Armstrong Flight Research Center, where she ran experimental test flights for the Stratospheric Observatory for Infrared Astronomy, T-38, T-34 and C-17. She is type-rated in heavy aircraft and fighters, including the Northrop T-38/Northrop F-5. Collectively, Latimer has more than 6,500 flight hours and 1,000 test flight hours in her work with NASA, Boeing and the Air Force.

Latimer became involved with system development and aircraft design during her time at Boeing. She was Chief Pilot and deputy director for Airlift operations for the Boeing C-17 Globemaster III. She was responsible for the global operations of the C-17, managing test pilots and training other aircrew. She is a member of the Huntington Beach surfing club Wahine Kai.

In 2015, she joined Virgin Galactic as a spaceship pilot. In 2017 she met Mike Pence when he visited the Mojave desert. She was the first woman to join Virgin Galactic pilot corps and was responsible for flying Virgin Galactic's White Knight Two, a dual fuselage high-wing composite aircraft that carries Spaceship 2. She also piloted the Boeing 747 Cosmic Girl for Virgin Orbit's LauncherOne. On August 10, 2023, aboard VSS Unity along with commercial astronaut pilot Frederick W. Sturckow for the Galactic 02 mission, Latimer officially became one of the first female commercial spaceship pilots.
