= Galactic 02 =

2023 private crewed suborbital spaceflight

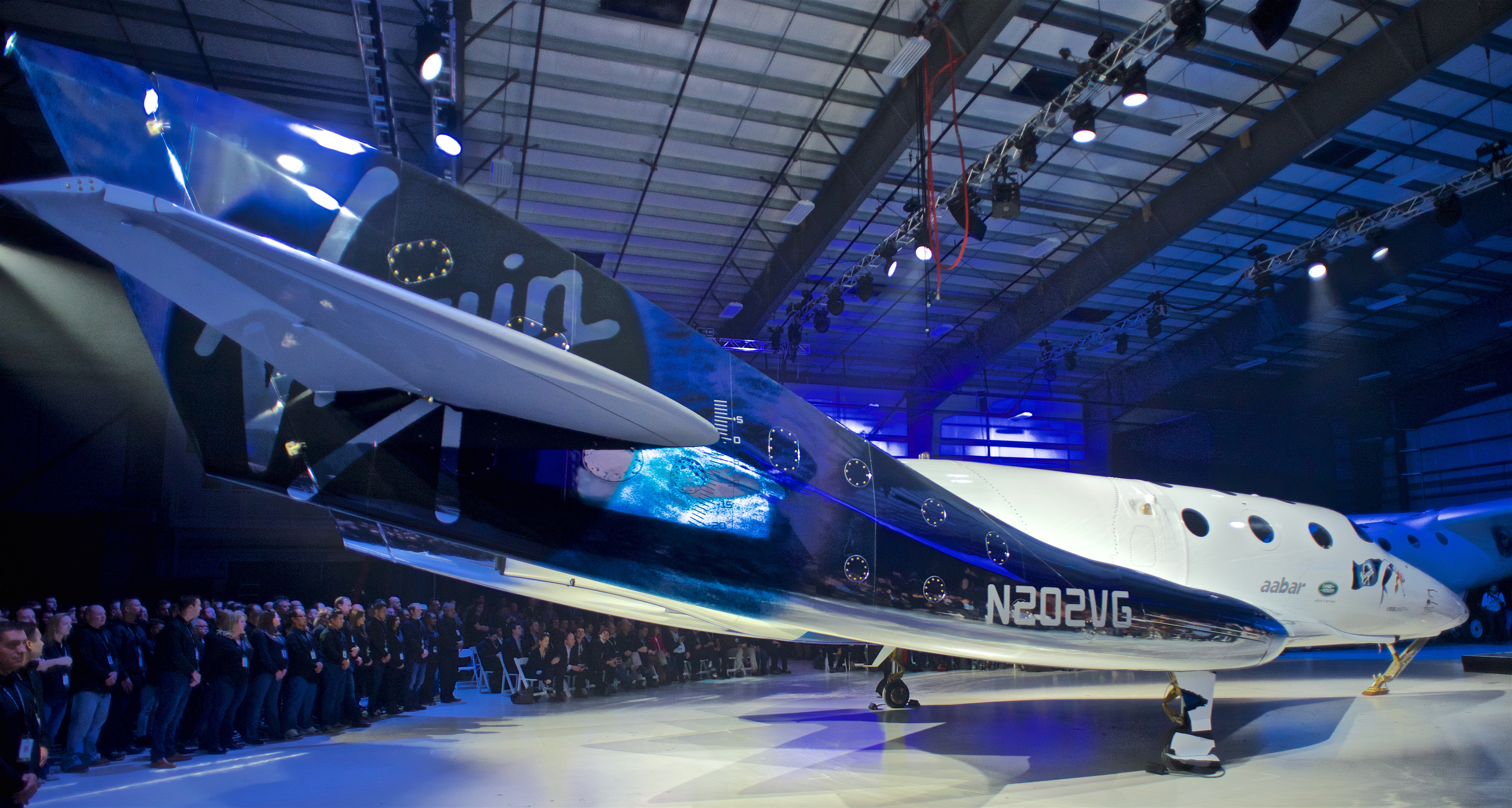
- Virgin Galactic SpaceShipTwo Unity
- Mission type: Crewed sub-orbital spaceflight
- Operator: Virgin Galactic
- Mission duration: 15 minutes and 38 seconds
- Apogee: 88.5 km (55.0 mi)

Spacecraft properties
- Spacecraft: VSS Unity
- Spacecraft type: SpaceShipTwo
- Manufacturer: The Spaceship Company

Crew
- Crew size: 6
- Members: CJ Sturckow; Kelly Latimer; Beth Moses; Jon Goodwin; Keisha Schahaff; Anastatia Mayers

Start of mission
- Launch date: 10 August 2023, 14:29:45 UTC
- Launch site: Spaceport America Runway 34
- Deployed from: VMS Eve

End of mission
- Landing date: 10 August 2023, 15:32:48 UTC
- Landing site: Spaceport America Runway 34
- Galactic 02 mission patch VSS Unity spaceflights

Galactic 02 (G02) was a crewed sub-orbital spaceflight of the SpaceShipTwo-class VSS Unity, launched on 10 August 2023. It was the second commercial spaceflight and seventh overall spaceflight for American aerospace company Virgin Galactic. The mission was the first to carry space tourists (people who are not working during the flight), as the previous flight, Galactic 01, carried astronauts from the Italian Air Force and the Italian National Research Council (who carried out research experiments during the flight).

== Crew ==
The crew of Galactic 02 included three private passengers and three Virgin Galactic employees. Jon Goodwin became the first Olympian and second person diagnosed with Parkinson's disease to fly to space, while Keisha Schahaff and Anastatia Mayers became the first mother-daughter duo to fly to space. Mayers also became the second youngest person and youngest woman to fly to space, as of August 2023.

Position	Crew
Commander	(United States) CJ Sturckow; Eighth spaceflight
Pilot	(United States) Kelly Latimer; First spaceflight
Astronaut instructor	(United States) Beth Moses; Fourth spaceflight
Tourist	(United Kingdom) Jon Goodwin; First spaceflight
Tourist	(Antigua and Barbuda) Keisha Schahaff; First spaceflight
Tourist	(Antigua and Barbuda) Anastatia Mayers; First spaceflight

== See also ==
- List of spaceflight launches in July–December 2023
