= Deng Qingming =

Chinese taikonaut (born 1966)

- 邓清明
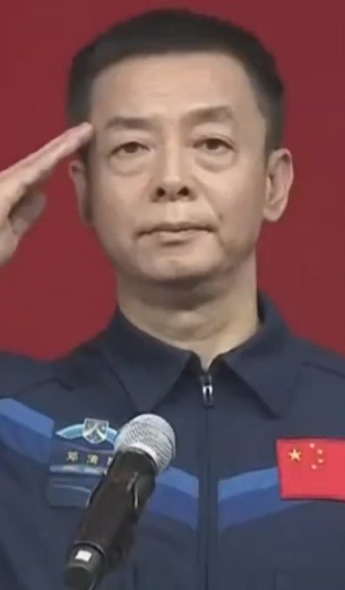
- Deng in November 2022
- Born: 16 March 1966 (age 60); Yihuang County, Jiangxi, China
- Space career

PLAAC astronaut
- Previous occupation: PLAAF fighter pilot
- Status: Active
- Time in space: 186 days, 7 hours and 25 minutes
- Selection: Chinese Group 1 (1998)
- Missions: Shenzhou 15

Chinese name
- Simplified Chinese: 邓清明
- Traditional Chinese: 鄧清明
Transcriptions
Standard Mandarin
- Hanyu Pinyin: Dèng Qīngmíng

Deng Qingming (Chinese: 邓清明; pinyin: Dèng Qīngmíng; born 16 March 1966) is a Chinese People's Liberation Army Astronaut Corps (PLAAC) taikonaut selected as part of the Shenzhou program.

== Early life ==
He was born into a family of farming background in the Yihuang County, Jiangxi, on 16 March 1966. He is the eldest of five children in the family.

== Career ==
A fighter pilot in the People's Liberation Army Air Force, he was selected to be an astronaut in 1998.

He was announced as a backup member of Shenzhou 9, Shenzhou 10, Shenzhou 11 and Shenzhou 12 before finally being selected as one of the three crew members of Shenzhou 15. After 24 years of training, in November 2022 he successfully blasted off on the mission to the Tiangong space station, where he stayed for 183 days before returning to Earth in June 2023.

== Personal life ==
His daughter was born in 1991 and now works in the Beijing Aerospace Flight Control Center.

== See also ==
- List of Chinese astronauts
- Chinese space programme
