= Shenzhou 15 =

2022 Chinese crewed spaceflight to the Tiangong Space Station

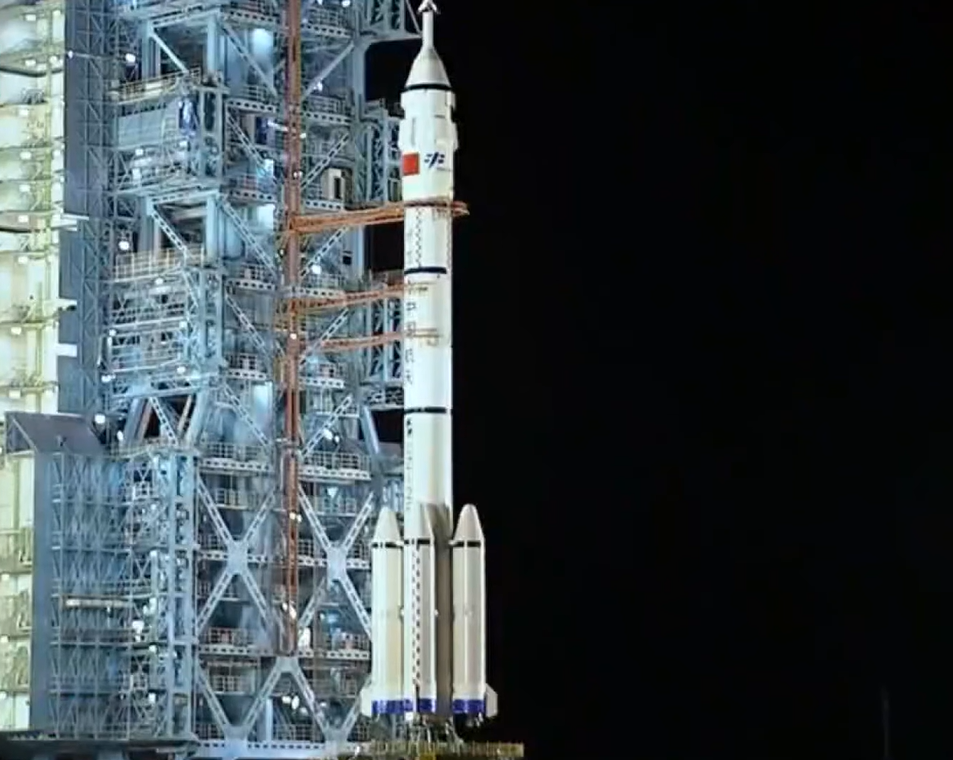
- Shenzhou 15 atop a Long March 2F/G prior to liftoff
- Mission type: Tiangong space station crew transport
- Operator: China Manned Space Agency
- COSPAR ID: 2022-162A
- SATCAT no.: 54379
- Mission duration: 186 days, 7 hours, 24 minutes

Spacecraft properties
- Spacecraft type: Shenzhou
- Manufacturer: China Aerospace Science and Technology Corporation

Crew
- Crew size: 3
- Members: Fei Junlong; Deng Qingming; Zhang Lu
- EVAs: 4
- EVA duration: 29 hours, 56 minutes

Start of mission
- Launch date: 29 November 2022 15:08:17 UTC (23:08:17 CST)
- Rocket: Long March 2F/G (Y23)
- Launch site: Jiuquan, LA-4/SLS-1
- Contractor: China Academy of Launch Vehicle Technology

End of mission
- Landing date: 3 June 2023, 22:33 UTC
- Landing site: Inner Mongolia (41°38′06.5″N 100°03′53.5″E)

Orbital parameters
- Reference system: Geocentric orbit
- Regime: Low Earth orbit
- Perigee altitude: 387 km (240 mi)
- Apogee altitude: 395 km (245 mi)
- Inclination: 41.48°

Docking with Tiangong space station
- Docking port: Tianhe forward
- Docking date: 29 November 2022, 21:42 UTC
- Undocking date: 3 June 2023, 13:29 UTC
- Time docked: 185 days, 15 hours, 47 minutes
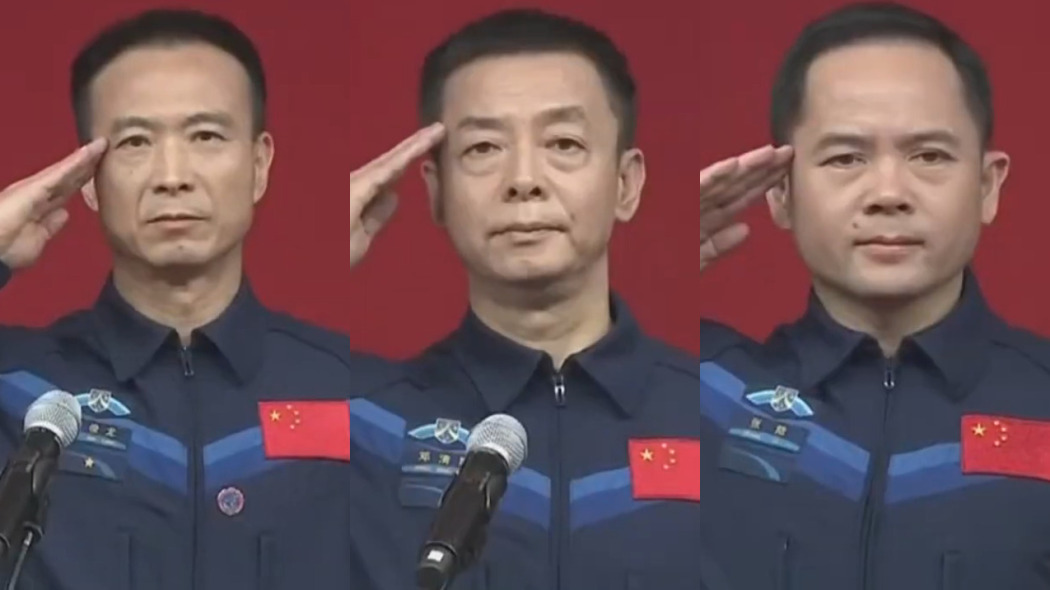
- Mission insignia From left: Fei Junlong, Deng Qingming and Zhang Lu Shenzhou program

Shenzhou 15 (simplified Chinese: 神舟十五号; traditional Chinese: 神舟十五號; pinyin: Shénzhōu shíwǔ hào) was a Chinese spaceflight to the Tiangong space station, launched on 29 November 2022 at 15:08:17 UTC. It carried three People's Liberation Army Astronaut Corps (PLAAC) taikonauts aboard a Shenzhou spacecraft. The flight was the tenth crewed Chinese spaceflight and the fifteenth mission overall of the China Manned Space Program.

The spacecraft docked with Tiangong about 6 1/2 hours after liftoff at 21:42. Shenzhou 15 was the first crew to overlap with the previous crew, allowing the station to remain continuously inhabited. The previous crew departed on 4 December. It was also the last mission focused primarily on assembly of the station, with subsequent missions placing greater emphasis on scientific research.

After remaining in orbit for 181 days, 17 hours, and 19 minutes, Shenzhou 15 departed the station on 3 June 2023 at 13:29. The crew landed safely in Inner Mongolia about nine hours later at 22:33.

== Background ==
Shenzhou 15 was the fourth spaceflight to the Tiangong space station, and the third with a standard mission duration of approximately six months. It was also the first mission to the station following its initial completion, with the launch and docking of the Wentian and Mengtian modules in July and October 2022 respectively.

Prior to launch, the Shenzhou 15 spacecraft was maintained in a state of near-readiness if needed as a lifeboat for the Shenzhou 14 crew.

The crew of Shenzhou 15 was announced on 28 November 2022.

== Mission ==
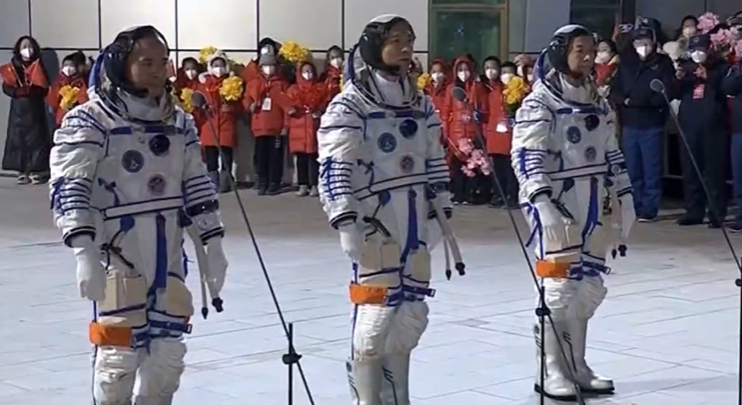
Shenzhou 15 crew during a pre-launch farewell ceremony

The flight launched from Jiuquan Satellite Launch Center on 29 November 2022 at 15:08 UTC, following the launch of Tianzhou 5 and near the end of the Shenzhou 14 mission. Just over 6.5 hours after launch, the spacecraft docked with the Tianhe core module's forward docking port.

The crew entered the station at 23:33 UTC on 29 November, and were greeted by the crew of Shenzhou 14. This marked the first Chinese crew handover in space, and set a new record for total taikonauts in space, at six. There was a five-day overlap between Shenzhou 15 and the previous mission before Shenzhou 14's departure on 4 December.

During the mission, the Shenzhou 16 spacecraft remained on standby to serve as an emergency rescue vehicle.

The Shenzhou 15 crew carried out four spacewalks, worked on payloads both inside and outside the station, and carried out other scientific work during the six-month mission. During Shenzhou 15's stay aboard Tiangong, the Tianzhou 6 cargo spacecraft arrived and docked with the station.

=== Spacewalks ===
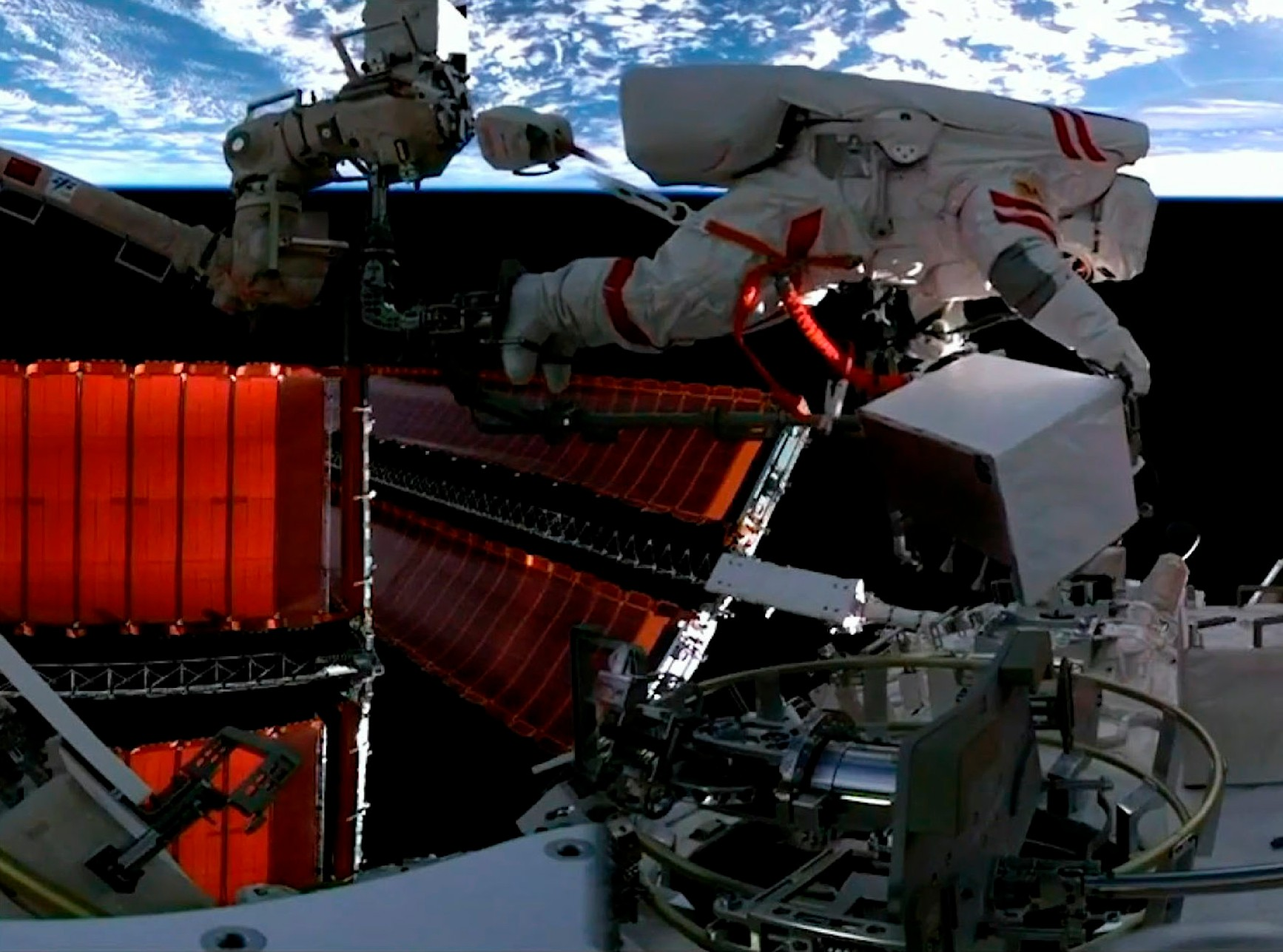
Fei Junlong performing a spacewalk outside Tiangong on February 9, 2023

On 9 February 2023, the first scheduled spacewalk of Shenzhou 15 was carried out by Fei Junlong and Zhang Lu, with Deng Qingming assisting the pair from inside the Tianhe core module. The two exited through the airlock of the Wentian lab module and completed a series of tasks, including the installation of a fourth external pump (Z01-04) on the Mengtian lab module and other tasks related to Mengtian's payload airlock, which allows science payloads and small satellites to be deployed using the station's robotic arms. The first spacewalk lasted for 7 hours and 6 minutes, a new duration record for a Chinese spacewalk at the time.

The second spacewalk was publicly announced on 2 March 2023 with no official date given (although rumors suggest it may have occurred on 28 February), with Fei Junlong and Zhang Lu on EVA while Deng Qingming once again assisted from aboard the station. According to some Chinese-language sources, the repetitive motion of detaching and re-attaching a safety tether to exterior handrails on the station strained Fei Junlong's upper body during the initial transfer to the work site. The equipment installed on EVA 2 allegedly had about 20 electrical plugs, whose protective covers had to be removed before installation and a power test.

The mission's third spacewalk was rumored to have occurred on 30 March 2023, although similar to the second EVA, no official date was given. Fei Junlong and Zhang Lu installed connecting cables across the station cabin, with more than 40 electrical plugs allegedly being installed.

The mission's fourth and final spacewalk is rumored to have occurred on 15 April 2023. Fei Junlong and Zhang Lu installed the fifth extended pump (Z02-01) on the exterior of Mengtian, as well as dumping trash bags, and installing additional cross-cabin cables, an external load exposure platform, and support rods for later, larger-scale science and technology experiments.

The total duration for the four spacewalks during the Shenzhou 15 mission exceeded 27 hours.

=== Return ===
Shenzhou 15 returned to Earth on 3 June 2023, landing at the Dongfeng landing site in the Gobi Desert in Inner Mongolia at 22:33 UTC.

=== Uncontrolled reentry of Orbital Module ===
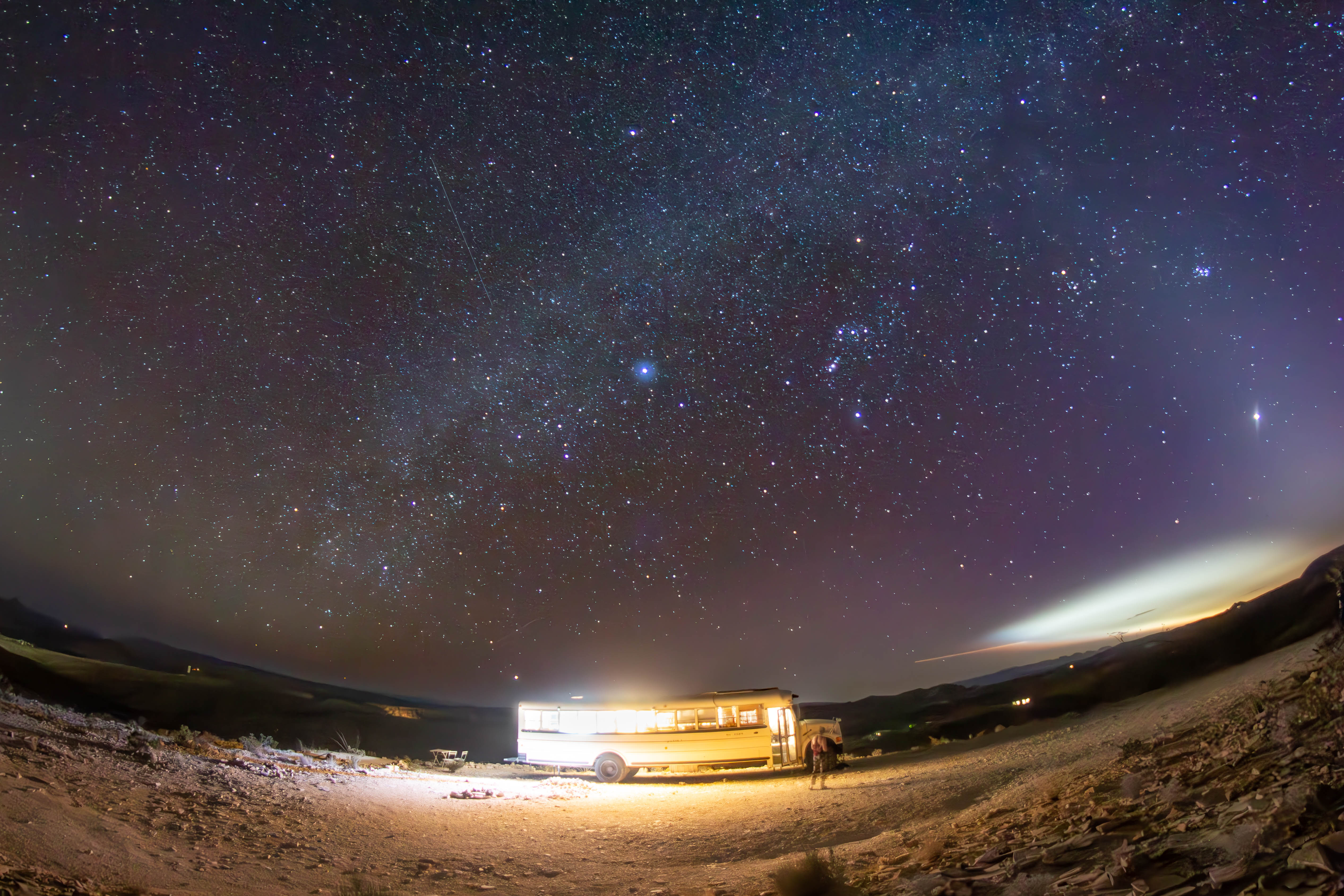
Orbital Module reentry seen from Big Bend National Park (bottom right). Note also Milky Way (center) and Zodiacal Light (right).

On 2 April 2024 at 08:40 UTC the 1,500 kilograms (3,300 lb) Shenzhou 15 Orbital Module reentered the Earth's atmosphere in an uncontrolled fashion over California. The Orbital Module burned in the atmosphere creating a blazing fireball witnessed by several people.

It was originally mistaken as the possible reentry of a SpaceX Falcon 9 stage that had launched the Starlink Group 7-18 launch that had taken place a few hours earlier or even for the launch itself before associations such as the American Meteor Society and the AAVSO identified it properly.

The uncontrolled reentry also raised criticism over proper disposal of space debris to avoid the associated danger to artificial satellites as well as people on the ground.

== Crew ==
Position	Crew
Commander	Fei Junlong, PLAAC; Second spaceflight
Operator	Deng Qingming, PLAAC; First spaceflight
System Operator	Zhang Lu, PLAAC; First spaceflight

Commander Fei Junlong previously flew on Shenzhou 6, China's second crewed spaceflight, in 2005.

Shenzhou 15 was Deng Qingming's first spaceflight after 25 years of training, having been selected as a taikonaut in 1997.
