= Shenzhou 17 =

2023 Chinese crewed spaceflight to the Tiangong space station

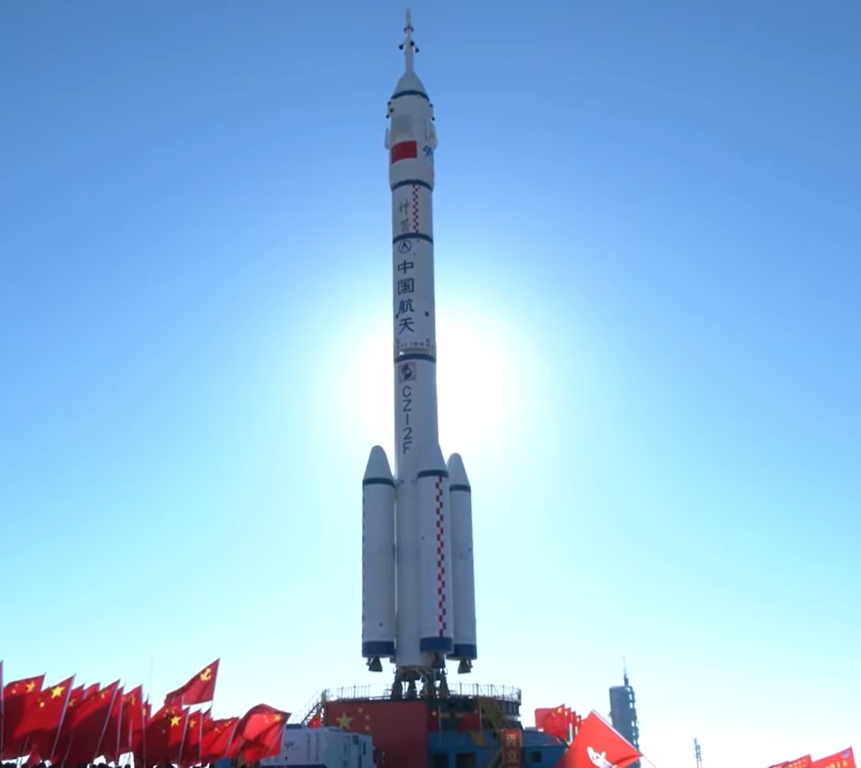
- Shenzhou 17 atop a Long March 2F/G prior to launch
- Mission type: Tiangong space station crew transport
- Operator: China Manned Space Agency
- COSPAR ID: 2023-164A
- SATCAT no.: 58146
- Mission duration: 187 days, 6 hours, 32 minutes

Spacecraft properties
- Spacecraft type: Shenzhou
- Manufacturer: China Aerospace Science and Technology Corporation

Crew
- Crew size: 3
- Members: Tang Hongbo; Tang Shengjie; Jiang Xinlin
- EVAs: 2
- EVA duration: 15 hours, 17 minutes

Start of mission
- Launch date: 26 October 2023, 03:14:02 UTC (11:14:02 CST)
- Rocket: Long March 2F/G (Y17)
- Launch site: Jiuquan, LA-4/SLS-1
- Contractor: China Academy of Launch Vehicle Technology

End of mission
- Landing date: 30 April 2024, 09:46:07 UTC
- Landing site: Inner Mongolia (41°36′15.8″N 100°04′07.7″E)

Orbital parameters
- Reference system: Geocentric orbit
- Regime: Low Earth orbit
- Perigee altitude: 372 km (231 mi)
- Apogee altitude: 380 km (240 mi)
- Inclination: 41.48°

Docking with Tiangong space station
- Docking port: Tianhe forward
- Docking date: 26 October 2023, 09:46 UTC
- Undocking date: 30 April 2024, 00:43 UTC
- Time docked: 186 days, 14 hours, 57 minutes
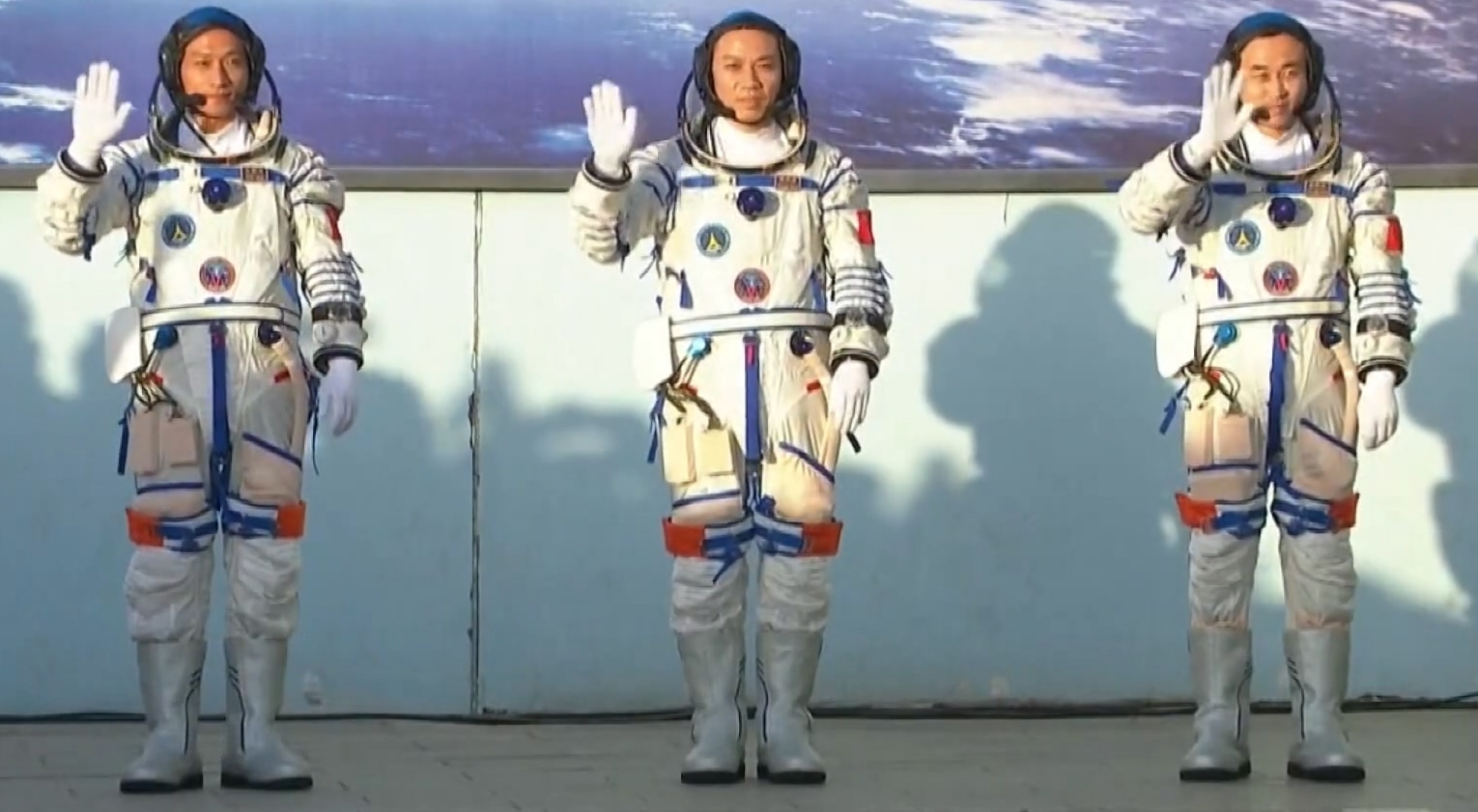
- Mission insignia From left: Jiang Xinlin, Tang Hongbo and Tang Shengjie Shenzhou program

Shenzhou 17 (simplified Chinese: 神舟十七号; traditional Chinese: 神舟十七號; pinyin: Shénzhōu shíqī hào) was a Chinese spaceflight to the Tiangong space station, launched on 26 October 2023. It carried three People's Liberation Army Astronaut Corps (PLAAC) taikonauts on board a Shenzhou spacecraft. The mission was the twelfth crewed Chinese spaceflight and the seventeenth flight overall of the Shenzhou program.

== Background ==
Shenzhou 17 was the sixth spaceflight to the Tiangong space station, lasting just over six months.

The spacecraft entered the launch area in April 2023, prior to launch was maintained in a state of near-readiness if needed as a lifeboat for the Shenzhou 16 crew.

The crew of Shenzhou 17 was announced on 25 October 2023.

== Mission ==
The flight launched from Jiuquan Satellite Launch Center on 26 October 2023 at 09:46 UTC, near the end of the Shenzhou 16 mission. Approximately 6.5 hours after launch, the spacecraft docked with the Tianhe core module's forward docking port.

Following docking, the crew entered the station and were greeted by the crew of Shenzhou 16, with whom they would share a four-day overlap between the two missions prior to Shenzhou 16's departure. The two crews sent a televised message to Mission Control as part of a handover ceremony, which was also livestreamed by Chinese national television broadcaster CCTV.

The mission ended on 30 April 2024, 9:46 UTC with a landing near the launch site in Inner Mongolia.

=== Spacewalks ===
On 21 December 2023, the first scheduled spacewalk of Shenzhou 17 was carried out by Tang Hongbo and Tang Shengjie through the airlock of the Wentian lab module. Tasks included a repair test of the Tianhe core module's solar panels, which have sustained minor damage caused by impacts of space debris and micrometeoroids. The spacewalk lasted for 7 hours and 25 minutes.

On 2 March 2024, the second scheduled spacewalk of Shenzhou 17 was carried out by Tang Hongbo and Jiang Xinlin through the airlock of the Wentian lab module. Tasks included maintenance of the solar panels of the Tianhe core module, evaluation and analysis of the performance status of the solar panel power generation and also inspection of the status of the space station modules. The spacewalk lasted for 7 hours and 52 minutes.

== Crew ==
Position	Crew
Commander	Tang Hongbo, PLAAC; Second spaceflight
Operator	Tang Shengjie, PLAAC; First spaceflight
System Operator	Jiang Xinlin, PLAAC; First spaceflight

Commander Tang Hongbo is the first person to visit the station twice, having previously flown to Tiangong on Shenzhou 12. He was in charge of keeping the crew safe and completing the mission. Tang Shengjie is a former Air Force pilot responsible for doing science operations aboard the station. Jiang Xinlin is also a former pilot, he is responsible for the maintenance during the mission.
