= Shenzhou 18 =

2024 Chinese crewed spaceflight to the Tiangong space station

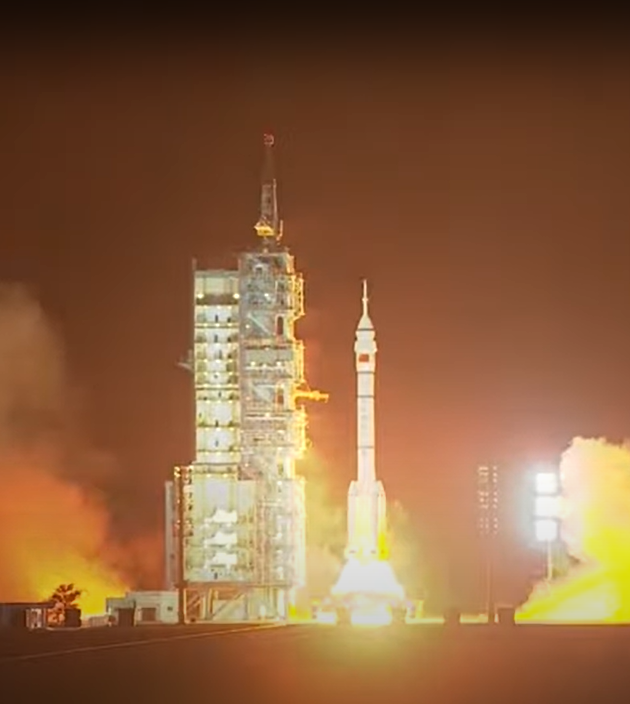
- Liftoff of Shenzhou 18
- Mission type: Tiangong space station crew transport
- Operator: China Manned Space Agency
- COSPAR ID: 2024-078A
- SATCAT no.: 59591
- Mission duration: 192 days, 4 hours, 25 minutes

Spacecraft properties
- Spacecraft type: Shenzhou
- Manufacturer: China Aerospace Science and Technology Corporation

Crew
- Crew size: 3
- Members: Ye Guangfu; Li Cong; Li Guangsu
- EVAs: 2
- EVA duration: 14 hours, 55 minutes

Start of mission
- Launch date: 25 April 2024, 12:59:00 UTC (20:59:00 CST)
- Rocket: Long March 2F/G (Y18)
- Launch site: Jiuquan, LA-4/SLS-1
- Contractor: China Academy of Launch Vehicle Technology

End of mission
- Landing date: 3 November 2024, 17:24:27 UTC
- Landing site: Inner Mongolia (41°37′49″N 100°03′42″E)

Orbital parameters
- Reference system: Geocentric orbit
- Regime: Low Earth orbit
- Perigee altitude: 371 km (231 mi)
- Apogee altitude: 380 km (240 mi)
- Inclination: 41.47°

Docking with Tiangong space station
- Docking port: Tianhe nadir
- Docking date: 25 April 2024, 19:32 UTC
- Undocking date: 3 November 2024, 08:12 UTC
- Time docked: 191 days, 12 hours, 40 minutes
- Mission insignia From left: Li Guangsu, Li Cong and Ye Guangfu Shenzhou program

Shenzhou 18 (simplified Chinese: 神舟十八号; traditional Chinese: 神舟十八號; pinyin: Shénzhōu shíbā hào) was a Chinese spaceflight to the Tiangong space station, launched on 25 April 2024. It carried three People's Liberation Army Astronaut Corps (PLAAC) taikonauts on board a Shenzhou spacecraft. The mission was the thirteenth crewed Chinese spaceflight and the eighteenth flight overall of the Shenzhou program.

The three crew members in this mission contributed to breaking the record for the most people (19) simultaneously in orbit, set after the Soyuz MS-26 mission launched on 11 September with its three crew members, along with the four crew members of the private Polaris Dawn mission launched on 10 September, and the nine crew members on the International Space Station.

== Background ==
Shenzhou 18 is the seventh flight to the Tiangong space station, and was expected to last approximately 6 months. It will depart following the arrival of the Shenzhou 19 crew.

The crew of Shenzhou 18 was announced on April 24, 2024.

== Mission ==
The mission launched from Jiuquan Satellite Launch Center on board a Long March 2F rocket on 25 April 2024 at 12:59:00 UTC (20:59 China Standard Time), near the end of the Shenzhou 17 mission. Approximately 6.5 hours after launch, the spacecraft docked at the nadir port of the station's Tianhe core module.

=== Spacewalks ===
On 28 May 2024, Ye Guangfu and Li Guangsu carried out China's longest spacewalk to date, exiting the airlock of the Wentian lab module and spending approximately 8.5 hours installing space debris protection shields and inspecting the exterior of the station.

Another spacewalk was conducted on 3 July 2024, during which Ye Guangfu and Li Cong installed further space debris protection shields on pipelines, cables, and other equipment.

=== Return ===
Shenzhou 18 successfully returned to Earth at 17:24 UTC on 3 November 2024.

== Crew ==
Position	Crew
Commander	Ye Guangfu, PLAAC; Second spaceflight
Operator	Li Cong, PLAAC; First spaceflight
System Operator	Li Guangsu, PLAAC; First spaceflight

Commander Ye Guangfu is the second person to visit the station twice, having previously flown to Tiangong on Shenzhou 13. He is responsible for the whole operation since launch and landing. Li Cong and Li Guangsu are former pilots. Li Cong is responsible for the station’s experiments and health maintenance operations while Li Guangsu is responsible for the maintenance of the space station while conducting experiments.
