= Ye Guangfu =

Chinese taikonaut (born 1980)

- 叶光富
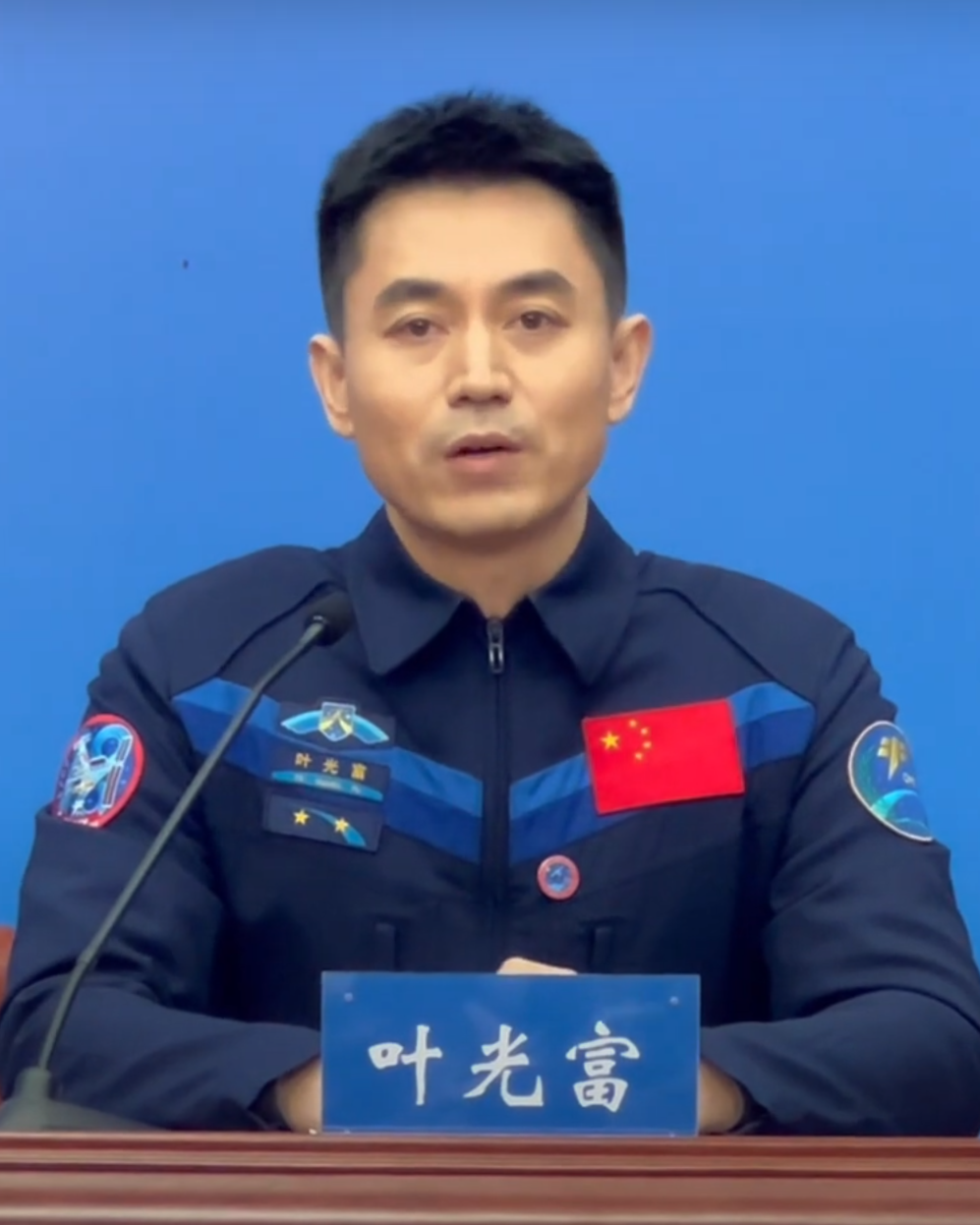
- Ye in 2025
- Born: September 1980 (age 46); Chengdu, Sichuan, China
- Space career

PLAAC astronaut
- Previous occupation: Fighter pilot, People's Liberation Army Air Force
- Status: Active
- Rank: Senior colonel, People's Liberation Army Strategic Support Force
- Time in space: 374 days, 13 hours, 57 minutes
- Selection: Chinese Group 2 (2010)
- Total EVAs: 2
- Total EVA time: 14 hours, 34 minutes
- Missions: Shenzhou 13; Shenzhou 18

Chinese name
- Simplified Chinese: 叶光富
- Traditional Chinese: 葉光富
Transcriptions
Standard Mandarin
- Hanyu Pinyin: Yè Guāngfù

Ye Guangfu (Chinese: 叶光富; pinyin: Yè Guāngfù; born September 1980) is a Chinese fighter pilot and People's Liberation Army Astronaut Corps (PLAAC) taikonaut selected as part of the Shenzhou program. A veteran of the Shenzhou 13 and Shenzhou 18 missions, he is the current Chinese record holder for longest spaceflight duration and the first taikonaut to spend over a year in space.

== Biography ==
Ye was born in a rural village Shuangliu County, Sichuan, to an ordinary family of farmers in September 1980. He has an elder sister. His father died when Ye was 8, and he helped with farm work from childhood. Ye's elementary education was at Wan'an Middle School (万安中学) and secondary education at Taiping High School (太平中学).

== Career ==
As a People's Liberation Army Air Force pilot, Ye spent four years as an instructor and four years as a jet fighter pilot and amassed a total of 1,100 hours of flight time. He was selected to join the second batch of Chinese astronauts in 2010 and qualified in 2014.

Ye made his first public appearance after participating in the ESA CAVES mission of 2016 organised by the ESA, making him the first Chinese participant of such an event.

He was part of the backup crew for Shenzhou 12, and flew on Shenzhou 13 to the Tiangong space station as a System Operator. On 26 November 2021, Ye and Shenzhou 13 commander Zhai Zhigang carried out the second EVA of the mission, marking Ye's first spacewalk and Zhai's third.

Ye was the commander of the Shenzhou 18 mission to Tiangong, which launched on 25 April 2024. On 28 May 2024, Ye Guangfu along with his Shenzhou 18 crewmate Li Guangsu carried out China's longest spacewalk yet, spending about 8.5 hours on tasks including the installation of the space station's space debris protection device.

== Personal life ==
Ye is married and has a son and a daughter. His father-in-law is a pilot.

Apart from his native language Chinese, he is also fluent in English and Russian.

== See also ==
- List of Chinese astronauts
- Chinese space programme
