= Jiang Xinlin =

Chinese taikonaut (born 1988)

- 江新林
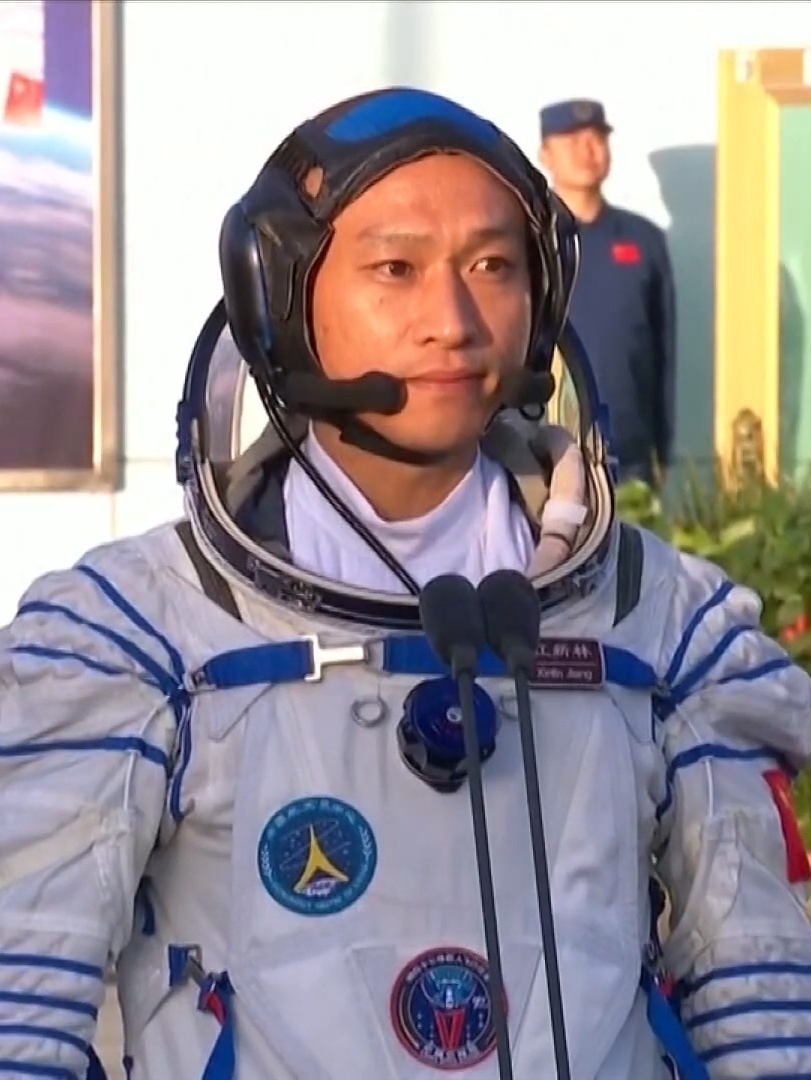
- Jiang Xinlin
- Born: February 1988 (age 38); Qi County, Kaifeng, Henan Province, China
- Education: PLA Army Armored Forces Academy College
- Space career

PLAAC astronaut
- Previous occupation: Fighter pilot Tank operator
- Status: Active
- Rank: Lieutenant colonel, People's Liberation Army Air Force
- Time in space: 187 days, 6 hours and 32 minutes
- Selection: Chinese Group 3 (2020)
- Total EVAs: 1
- Total EVA time: 7 hours 52 minutes
- Missions: Shenzhou 17

Chinese name
- Simplified Chinese: 江新林
- Traditional Chinese: 江新林
Transcriptions
Standard Mandarin
- Hanyu Pinyin: Jiāng Xīn Lín

Jiang Xinlin (Chinese: 江新林; born February 1988) is a Chinese pilot selected as part of the Shenzhou program. He enlisted in the People's Liberation Army (PLA) in September 2006.

== Biography ==
Jiang was born in rural Qiu County, Kaifeng, Henan Province, in February 1988. He held numerous part-time jobs from a very young age to help his family's needs. In 2006, Jiang was admitted to the former PLA Army Armored Forces Academy College. In September 2006, he enlisted in the PLA and became a ground force tank driver. Later in 2010, after Jiang Jiang graduated from the PLA Army Armored Forces Academy College, participated in the Air Force pilot selection and was selected. He is a fourth-level astronaut in the Astronaut Corps of the Chinese People's Liberation Army and is a first class PLA Air Force pilot for 10 years. During this time, Jiang flew more than 1,000 hours safely, was rated as a first-class pilot of the Air Force, and served as the deputy captain of a flying brigade of the Air Force Aviation Brigade, and was promoted to the rank of lieutenant colonel in the PLAAF.

In 2018, he participated in the selection of the third batch of taikonauts. In September 2020, as an aerospace flight engineer, he was selected in third taikonaut group. Jiang underwent difficult training in field survival and zero-g preparation using the zero-gravity rotating chair. Two years later in June 2022, he was selected as the crew for the crewed mission of Shenzhou 17 as a system operator. He flew to Tiangong Space Station on Shenzhou-17 on 26 October 2023 and docked later on the same day.

== See also ==
- List of Chinese astronauts
- Chinese space programme
