= Tang Shengjie =

Chinese taikonaut (born 1989)

- 唐胜杰
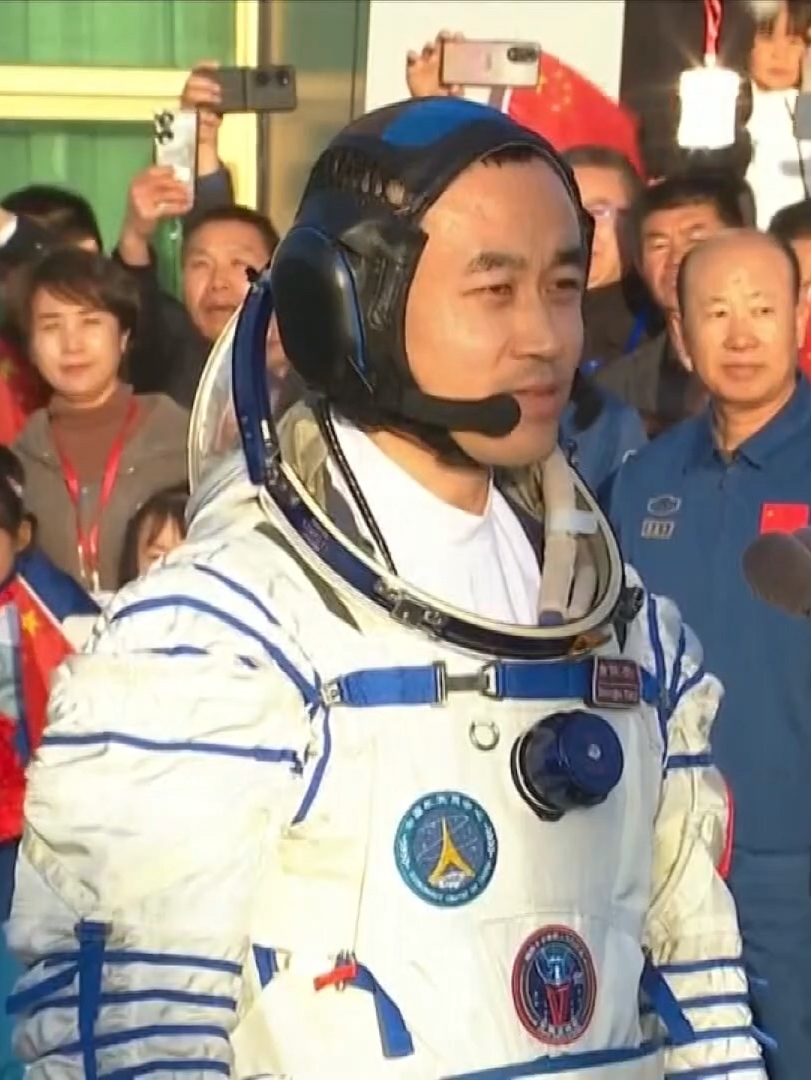
- Tang Shengjie
- Born: December 1989 (age 36); Dingxi, Gansu, China
- Education: Air Force Aviation University
- Occupations: Lieutenant colonel, People's Liberation Army Air Force
- Space career

PLAAC astronaut
- Status: Active
- Time in space: 187 days, 6 hours and 32 minutes
- Selection: Chinese Group 3 (2020)
- Missions: Shenzhou 17

Chinese name
- Simplified Chinese: 唐胜杰
- Traditional Chinese: 唐勝傑
Transcriptions
Standard Mandarin
- Hanyu Pinyin: Táng Shèng Jié

Tang Shengjie (Chinese: 唐胜杰; born December 1989) is a Chinese pilot selected as part of the Shenzhou program. He enlisted in the People's Liberation Army (PLA) in September 2008.

== Biography ==
Tang was born in a rural village in Dingxi, Gansu, northwest China to a family of farmers in December 1989. Since childhood, Tang had been indulging in activities needed to become a taikonaut. He graduated from Air Force Aviation University in 2012. He is a fourth-level astronaut in the Astronaut Corps of the Chinese People's Liberation Army and is a first class PLA Air Force pilot for 13 years. He once served as the captain of a flying squadron of a certain brigade of the Air Force Aviation Corps, and was thus selected in PLAAF. During this time, he flew six different aircraft and was promoted to the rank of lieutenant colonel in the PLAAF.

In September 2020, as an aerospace flight engineer, he was selected in the third taikonaut group. He went through strenuous astronaut training like underwater training for EVAs which he cleared off successfully. Tang appreciates photographing. Two years later in June 2022, he was selected as the crew for the crewed mission of Shenzhou 17 as an operator. He flew to Tiangong Space Station on Shenzhou-17 on 26 October 2023 and docked later on the same day. As of now, Tang Shengjie is youngest taikonaut in space.

== See also ==
- List of Chinese astronauts
- Chinese space programme
