= Tianzhou 8 =

2024 Chinese resupply spaceflight

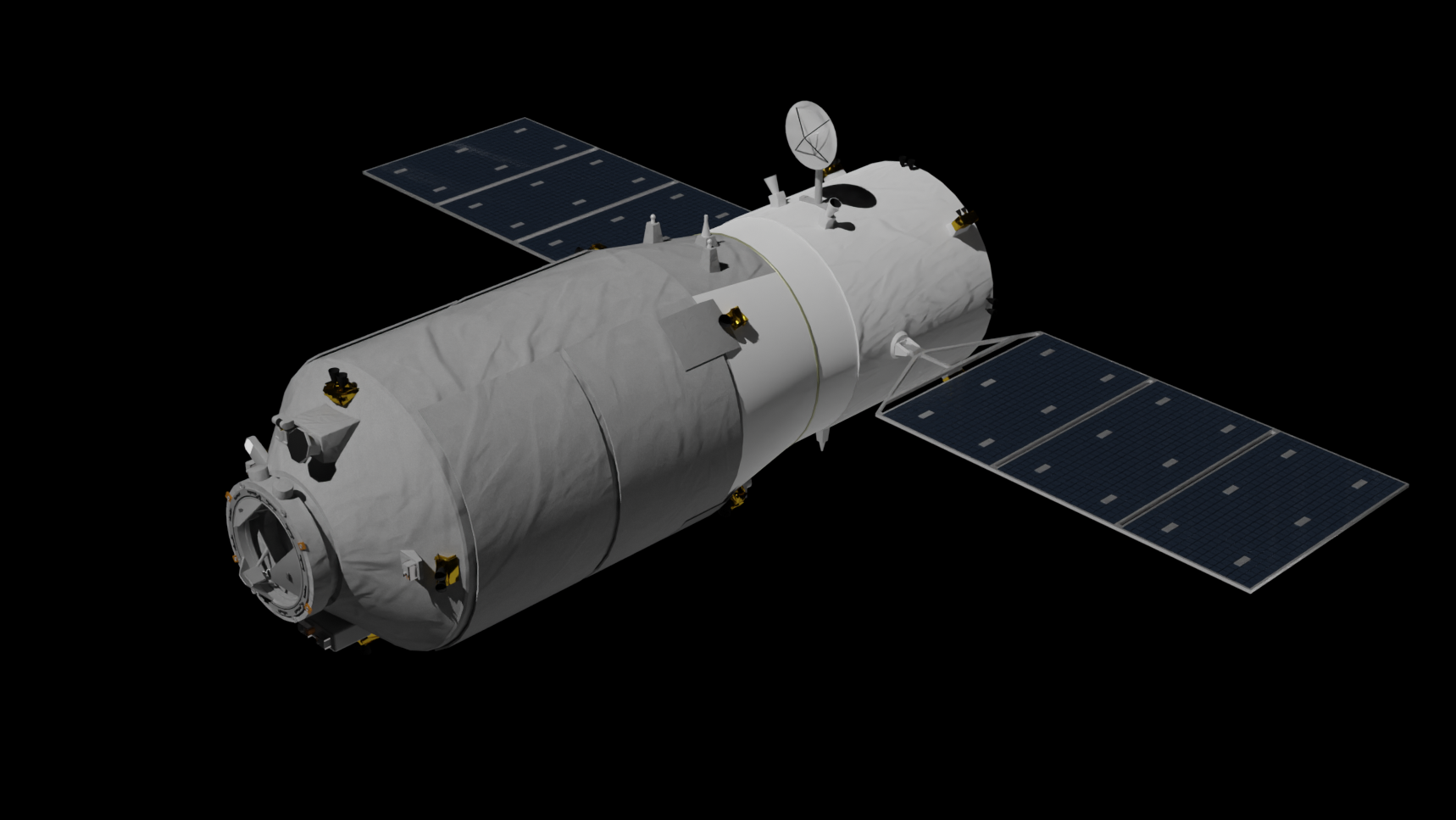
- A Tianzhou 3D model
- Mission type: Tiangong space station resupply
- Operator: CNSA
- COSPAR ID: 2024-211A
- SATCAT no.: 61983
- Mission duration: 235 days, 7 hours, 33 minutes

Spacecraft properties
- Spacecraft: Tianzhou-8
- Spacecraft type: Tianzhou
- Manufacturer: China Aerospace Science and Technology Corporation
- Launch mass: 14,000 kg (31,000 lb)
- Payload mass: 6,000 kg (13,000 lb)
- Dimensions: 10.6 m × 3.35 m (34.8 ft × 11.0 ft)

Expedition
- Space station: Tiangong space station

Start of mission
- Launch date: 15 November 2024, 15:13 UTC
- Rocket: Long March 7 (Y9)
- Launch site: Wenchang, LC-201
- Contractor: China Academy of Launch Vehicle Technology

End of mission
- Disposal: Deorbited
- Decay date: 8 July 2025, 22:46 UTC

Orbital parameters
- Reference system: Geocentric orbit
- Regime: Low Earth orbit
- Inclination: 41.5°

Docking with Tiangong space station
- Docking port: Tianhe aft
- Docking date: 15 November 2024, 18:32 UTC
- Undocking date: 8 July 2025, 07:09 UTC
- Time docked: 234 days, 12 hours, 37 minutes
- Mission patch Tianzhou program

Tianzhou 8 (Chinese: 天舟八号) was the eighth mission of the Tianzhou-class uncrewed cargo spacecraft, and the seventh resupply mission to the Tiangong space station. Like previous Tianzhou missions, the spacecraft was launched from the Wenchang Satellite Launch Center in Hainan, China on a Long March 7 rocket.

== Mission history ==
Tianzhou 8 was launched on November 15, 2024, successfully docking with Tiangong after a three-hour flight.

Like all Tianzhou craft since Tianzhou 6, Tianzhou 8 stayed docked to Tiangong for around 9 months before being deorbited on July 8, 2025 to make room for the next supply mission.

== Payload ==
Tianzhou 8 delivered 6,000 kg of supplies and materials to Tiangong, 102 kg more mass than its predecessor Tianzhou 7. The cargo includes various bricks made from lunar regolith simulant, which will be deployed on external racks outside Tiangong for up to three years before being returned to the earth for analysis.
