= Shenzhou 16 =

2023 Chinese crewed spaceflight to the Tiangong space station

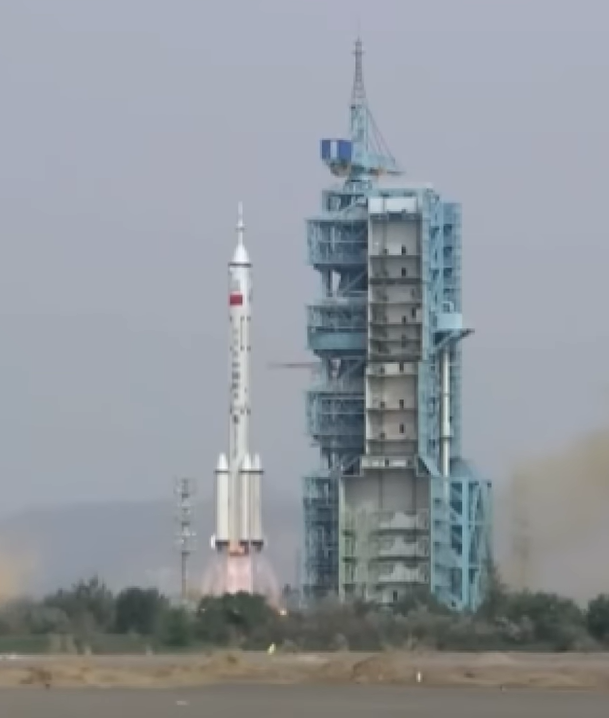
- Launch of Shenzhou 16 on a Long March 2F/G
- Mission type: Tiangong space station crew transport
- Operator: China Manned Space Agency
- COSPAR ID: 2023-077A
- SATCAT no.: 56761
- Mission duration: 153 days, 22 hours, 40 minutes

Spacecraft properties
- Spacecraft type: Shenzhou
- Manufacturer: China Aerospace Science and Technology Corporation

Crew
- Crew size: 3
- Members: Jing Haipeng; Zhu Yangzhu; Gui Haichao
- EVAs: 1
- EVA duration: 7 hours, 55 minutes

Start of mission
- Launch date: 30 May 2023, 01:31:13 UTC (09:31:13 CST)
- Rocket: Long March 2F/G (Y16)
- Launch site: Jiuquan, LA-4/SLS-1
- Contractor: China Academy of Launch Vehicle Technology

End of mission
- Landing date: 31 October 2023, 00:11:32 UTC
- Landing site: Inner Mongolia (41°39′28″N 100°06′52″E)

Orbital parameters
- Reference system: Geocentric orbit
- Regime: Low Earth orbit
- Perigee altitude: 380 km (240 mi)
- Apogee altitude: 385 km (239 mi)
- Inclination: 41.47°

Docking with Tiangong space station
- Docking port: Tianhe nadir
- Docking date: 30 May 2023, 08:29 UTC
- Undocking date: 30 October 2023, 12:37 UTC
- Time docked: 153 days, 4 hours, 8 minutes
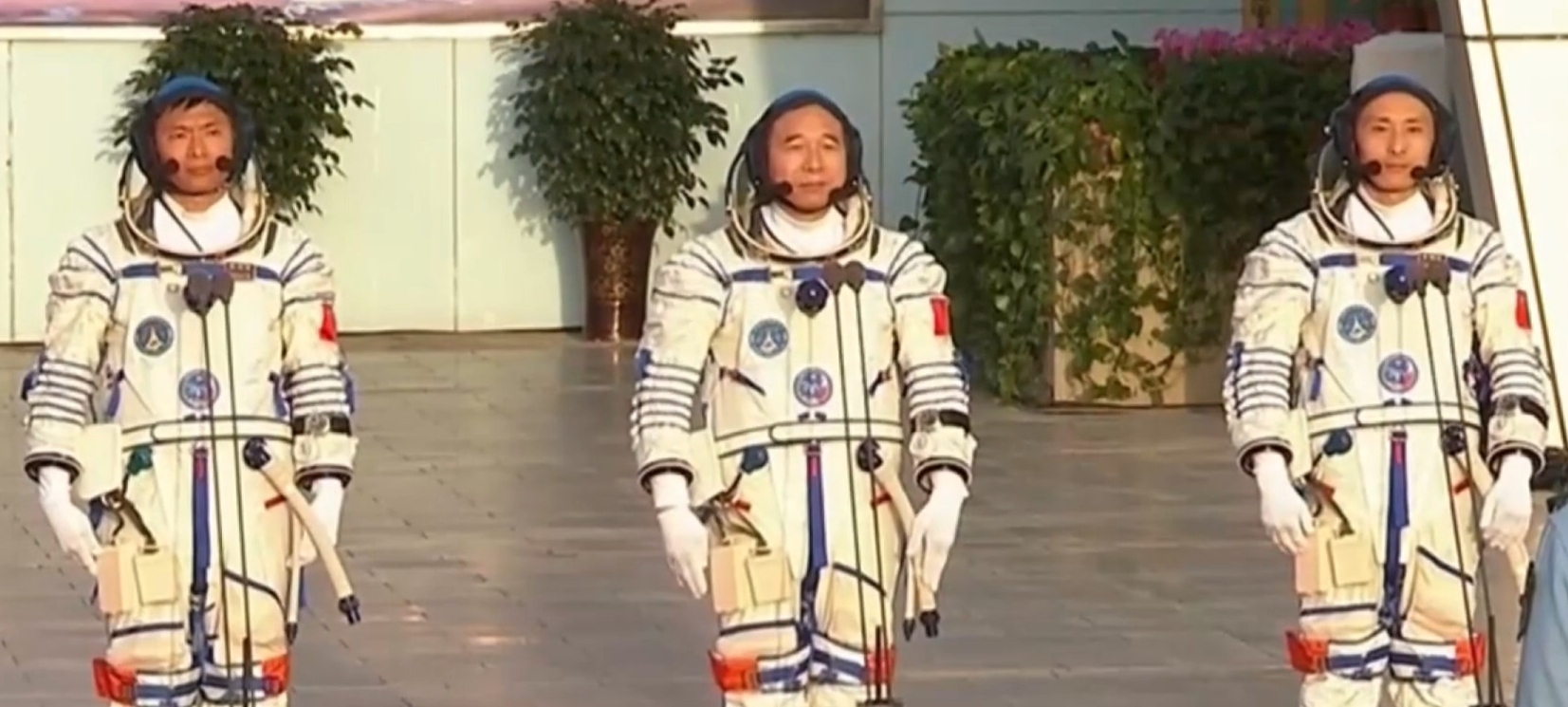
- Mission insignia From left: Gui Haichao, Jing Haipeng and Zhu Yangzhu Shenzhou program

Shenzhou 16 (simplified Chinese: 神舟十六号; traditional Chinese: 神舟十六號; pinyin: Shénzhōu shíliù hào) was a Chinese spaceflight to the Tiangong space station launched on 30 May 2023. The mission carried a crew of three aboard a Shenzhou spacecraft. It was the eleventh crewed Chinese spaceflight and the sixteenth mission of the Shenzhou program.

The mission was the first flight of the "application phase" of Tiangong following completion of the station's assembly. Its crew included Gui Haichao, a professor and researcher at Beihang University, who became the first civilian scientist to fly on a Shenzhou mission.

== Background ==
Shenzhou 16 was the fifth spaceflight to the Tiangong space station, with a mission duration of approximately five months.

The spacecraft completed construction and testing in December 2022, and prior to launch was maintained in a state of near-readiness if needed as a lifeboat for the Shenzhou 15 crew.

== Mission ==
The flight launched from Jiuquan Satellite Launch Center on 30 May 2023 at 9:31 AM China Standard Time (01:31 UTC), following the launch of the Tianzhou 6 cargo spacecraft and near the end of the Shenzhou 15 mission. Just under 7 hours after launch, the spacecraft docked with the Tianhe core module's nadir docking port.

Upon entering the station, the crew were greeted by and performed a handover ceremony with the crew of Shenzhou 15, with whom they would share a four-day mission overlap prior to the previous crew's departure on June 3.

=== Spacewalk ===
On 20 July 2023, the first scheduled spacewalk of Shenzhou 16 was carried out by Jing Haipeng and Zhu Yangzhu through the airlock of the Wentian lab module (Zhu Yangzhu being the first Chinese flight engineer to perform a spacewalk), with Gui Haichao assisting the pair from inside the Tianhe core module. The crew completed a variety of tasks, including the installation and lifting of the support frame for a panoramic camera outside Tiangong's Tianhe core module and unlocking and lifting two panoramic cameras outside the Mengtian experiment module. The spacewalk lasted for 7 hours and 55 minutes, beating the previous EVA duration record of 7 hours and 6 minutes on Shenzhou 15.

=== Return ===
Shenzhou 16 returned to Earth on October 30, 2023, landing at the Dongfeng landing site in the Gobi Desert in Inner Mongolia. Footage of the landing showed an apparent hole in the descent parachute and the capsule tumbling on impact, but the crew was unharmed.

== Crew ==
Position	Crew
Commander	Jing Haipeng, PLAAC; Fourth spaceflight
Flight engineer	Zhu Yangzhu, PLAAC; First spaceflight
Payload specialist	Gui Haichao, CMSA; First spaceflight

Shenzhou 16 marked Commander Jing Haipeng's fourth trip to space, a new record for a Chinese taikonaut. Payload specialist Gui Haichao, a professor at Beihang University, became the first Chinese civilian in space. Gui Haichao and Zhu Yangzhu were also the first members of Chinese Group 3 to fly to space.

== See also ==
- Shenzhou (spacecraft)
- Tiangong space station
- Tianzhou (spacecraft)
- List of Tiangong space station spacewalks
