= Tianzhou 2 =

2021 Chinese resupply spaceflight to the Tiangong Space Station

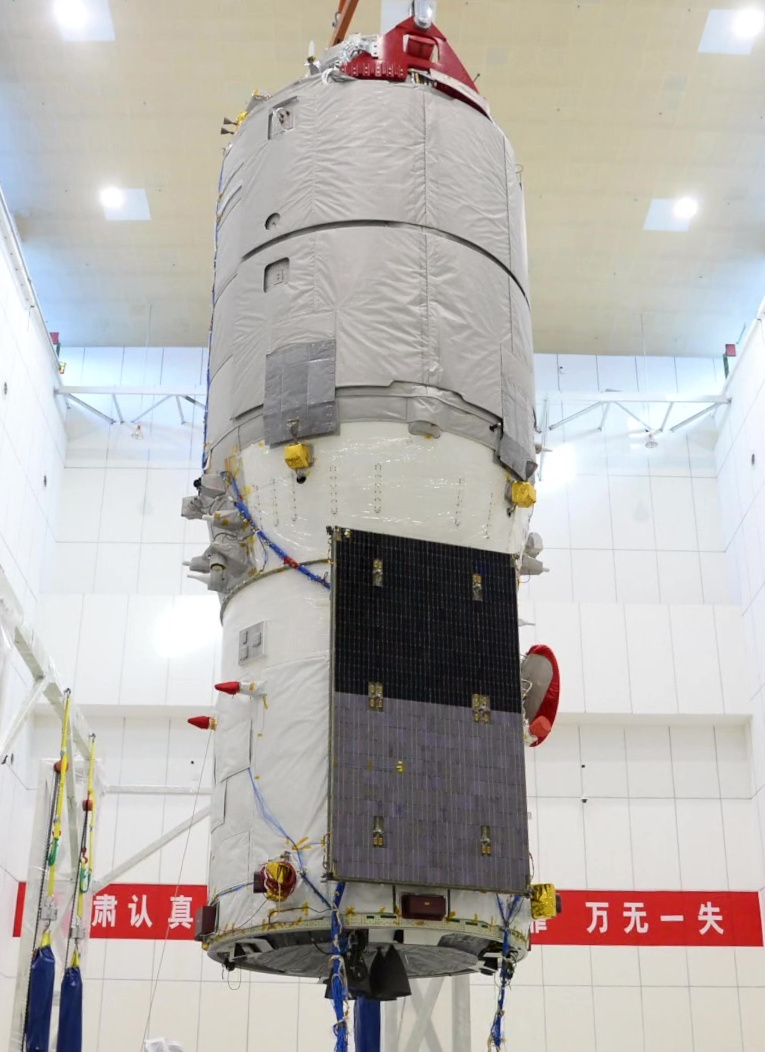
- Tianzhou 2 prior to launch
- Mission type: Tiangong space station resupply
- Operator: China National Space Administration
- COSPAR ID: 2021-046A
- SATCAT no.: 48803
- Mission duration: 305 days, 21 hours, 44 minutes

Spacecraft properties
- Spacecraft type: Tianzhou
- Manufacturer: China Aerospace Science and Technology Corporation
- Launch mass: 13,640 kg (30,070 lb)
- Dry mass: 6,640 kg (14,640 lb)
- Dimensions: 10.6 × 3.35 m (34.8 × 11.0 ft)

Start of mission
- Launch date: 29 May 2021, 12:55:29 UTC (20:55:29 CST)
- Rocket: Long March 7 (Y3)
- Launch site: Wenchang, LC-201
- Contractor: China Academy of Launch Vehicle Technology

End of mission
- Disposal: Deorbited
- Destroyed: 31 March 2022, 10:40 UTC

Orbital parameters
- Reference system: Geocentric orbit
- Regime: Low Earth orbit
- Perigee altitude: 330 km (210 mi)
- Apogee altitude: 340 km (210 mi)
- Inclination: 41.4°

Docking with Tiangong space station
- Docking port: Tianhe aft
- Docking date: 29 May 2021, 21:01 UTC
- Undocking date: 18 September 2021, 02:25 UTC
- Time docked: 111 days, 5 hours, 24 minutes

Docking with Tiangong space station (relocation)
- Docking port: Tianhe forward
- Docking date: 18 September 2021, ~06:00 UTC
- Undocking date: 5 January 2022, 22:12 UTC
- Time docked: 109 days, 16 hours, 12 minutes

Docking with Tiangong space station (test)
- Docking port: Tianhe forward
- Docking date: 5 January 2022, 22:59 UTC
- Undocking date: 7 January 2022, ~22:00 UTC
- Time docked: 1 day, 22 hours, 56 minutes

Docking with Tiangong space station (test)
- Docking port: Tianhe forward
- Docking date: 7 January 2022, 23:55 UTC
- Undocking date: 27 March 2022, 07:59 UTC
- Time docked: 78 days, 8 hours, 4 minutes

Cargo
- Mass: 6,640 kg (14,640 lb)
- Pressurised: 4,690 kg (10,340 lb)
- Fuel: 1,950 kg (4,300 lb)
- Mission insignia Tianzhou program

Tianzhou 2 (Chinese: 天舟二号) was a mission of the Tianzhou-class uncrewed cargo spacecraft. It launched on 29 May 2021 at 12:55:29 UTC. The spacecraft docked with the Tiangong space station later the same day.

== Mission profile ==
Tianzhou 2 was part of the construction phase of the Tiangong space station and was the first cargo resupply mission to dock with the Tianhe core module, which had launched on 29 April 2021.

The spacecraft initially made an automated docking to Tianhe's aft port, where it remained for approximately 111 days. Following the departure of the crewed Shenzhou 12 mission in September 2021, Tianzhou 2 made an automated relocation to the station's forward docking port to make room for the arrival of Tianzhou 3 at the aft port.

During its mission, Tianzhou 2 carried out multiple teleoperated and autonomous rendezvous and docking tests. In one test, the spacecraft undocked and performed a teleoperated rendezvous and docking exercise in which an astronaut aboard Tianhe manually controlled the spacecraft from a station console, simulating a failure of the automated docking system during final approach. In another test conducted two days later, the station's robotic arm grappled Tianzhou 2, unberthed it from the forward port, maneuvered it approximately 20 degrees to the port side, and returned it for manual berthing. The exercise simulated procedures that could be used during the relocation of future laboratory modules if their indexing robotic arms became unavailable.

Tianzhou 2 undocked on 27 March 2022. It later completed a two-hour fast rendezvous test without docking on 30 March 2022 before making a planned destructive reentry into Earth's atmosphere on 31 March 2022.
