= Long March 7 =

Chinese medium to heavy-lift launch vehicle

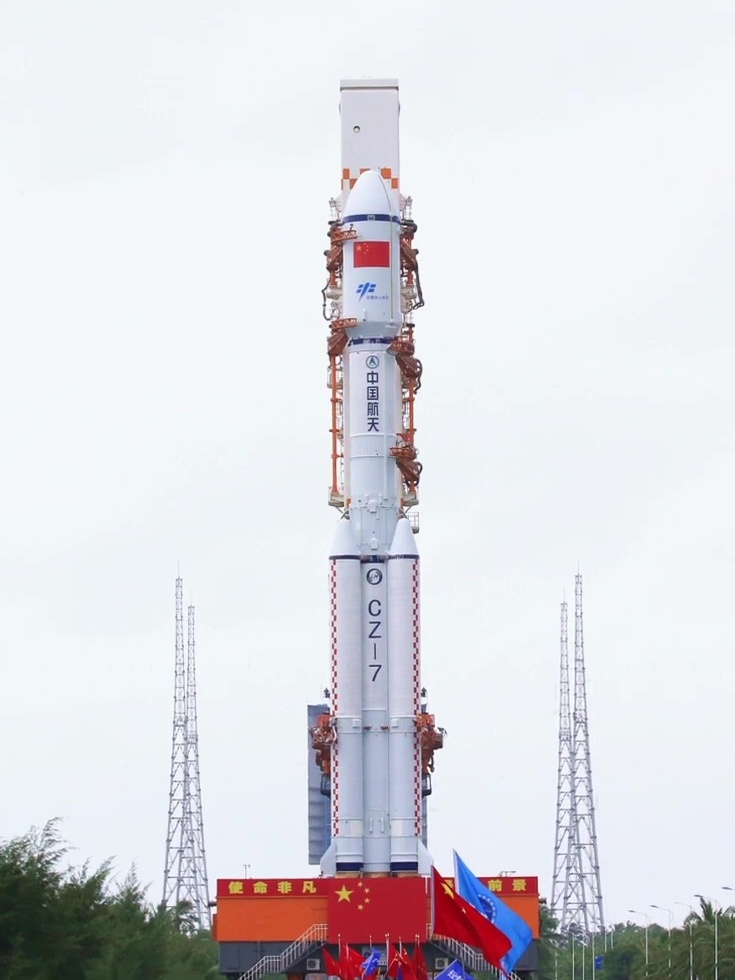
- Long March 7 Y6 transporting to launch site
- Function: Medium to heavy-lift launch vehicle
- Manufacturer: China Academy of Launch Vehicle Technology
- Country of origin: China

Size
- Height: 7: 53.1 m (174 ft 3 in); 7A: 60.13 m (197 ft 3 in)
- Diameter: 3.35 m (11 ft)
- Mass: 7: 597,000 kg (1,316,000 lb); 7A: 573,000 kg (1,263,000 lb)
- Stages: 7: 2; 7A: 3

Capacity

Payload to LEO
- Altitude: 200 × 400 km (120 × 250 mi)
- Orbital inclination: 42°
- Mass: 13,500 kg (29,800 lb)

Payload to GTO
- Mass: 7,000 kg (15,000 lb)

Payload to TLI
- Mass: 5,000 kg (11,000 lb)

Payload to SSO
- Altitude: 700 km (430 mi)
- Mass: 5,500 kg (12,100 lb)

Associated rockets
- Family: Long March
- Comparable: Atlas V; Delta IV; Falcon 9 Block 5; LVM3; H-IIA

Launch history
- Status: Active
- Launch sites: Wenchang, LC-2
- Total launches: 29 (7: 11, 7A: 18)
- Success(es): 27 (7: 11, 7A: 16)
- Failure: 2 (7: 0, 7A: 2)
- First flight: 7: 25 June 2016; 7A: 16 March 2020
- Last flight: 7: 11 May 2026 (most recent); 7A: 10 August 2026 (most recent)

Boosters – K2
- No. boosters: 4
- Height: 27 m (89 ft)
- Diameter: 2.25 m (7 ft 5 in)
- Powered by: 1 × YF-100
- Maximum thrust: SL: 1,200 kN (270,000 lb_{f}) vac: 1,340 kN (300,000 lb_{f})
- Total thrust: SL: 4,800 kN (1,100,000 lb_{f}) vac: 5,360 kN (1,200,000 lb_{f})
- Specific impulse: SL: 300 s (2.9 km/s) vac: 335 s (3.29 km/s)
- Propellant: RP-1 / LOX

First stage – K3
- Diameter: 3.35 m (11.0 ft)
- Powered by: 2 × YF-100
- Maximum thrust: SL: 2,400 kN (540,000 lb_{f}) vac: 2,680 kN (600,000 lb_{f})
- Specific impulse: SL: 300 s (2.9 km/s) vac: 335 s (3.29 km/s)
- Propellant: RP-1 / LOX

Second stage
- Diameter: 3.35 m (11.0 ft)
- Powered by: 4 × YF-115
- Maximum thrust: 706 kN (159,000 lb_{f})
- Specific impulse: 342 s (3.35 km/s)
- Propellant: RP-1 / LOX

Third stage (CZ-7A)
- Diameter: 3.0 m (9.8 ft)
- Empty mass: 2,800 kg (6,200 lb)
- Gross mass: 21,000 kg (46,000 lb)
- Propellant mass: 18,200 kg (40,100 lb)
- Powered by: 2 × YF-75
- Maximum thrust: 167.17 kN (37,580 lb_{f})
- Specific impulse: 4,295 m/s (438.0 s)
- Burn time: 478 seconds
- Propellant: LH_{2} / LOX

Third stage (CZ-7, optional) – YZ-1A
- Powered by: 1 × YF-50D
- Maximum thrust: 6.5 kN (1,500 lb_{f})
- Specific impulse: 315.5 s (3.094 km/s)
- Propellant: N_{2}O_{4} / UDMH

The Long March 7 (Chinese: 长征七号运载火箭), or Chang Zheng 7 in pinyin, abbreviated LM-7 for export or CZ-7 within China, originally Long March 2F/H or Chang Zheng 2F/H, nicknamed Bingjian (冰箭; 'the Ice Arrow'), is a Chinese liquid-fuelled medium-lift launch vehicle of the Long March family, developed by the China Aerospace Science and Technology Corporation (CAST). It made its inaugural flight on 25 June 2016.

Designed as a replacement of the Long March 2F, Long March 7 and its variants was expected to be the workhorse of the fleet, projected to account for around 70% of all Chinese launches. Long March 7 plays a critical role in the Tiangong space station program: it is used to launch the Tianzhou robotic cargo and resupply spacecraft. Although initially planned to replace the Long March 2F as China's crew-rated launch vehicle, by 2023 this role has apparently shifted by the under-development Long March 10A.

Unlike older Chinese rockets, CZ-7 does not use hypergolic propellants. The vehicle has two kerolox-fuelled base stages, and uses six YF-100 engines at launch, one each on four boosters and two on the core first stage; the second stage uses four YF-115 engines. The Long March 7A variant, flying from 2020, has a hydrolox third stage powered by two YF-75 engines, inherited from the third stage of the Long March 3B. The rocket has also been developed into the Long March 8 using fewer boosters.

== History ==
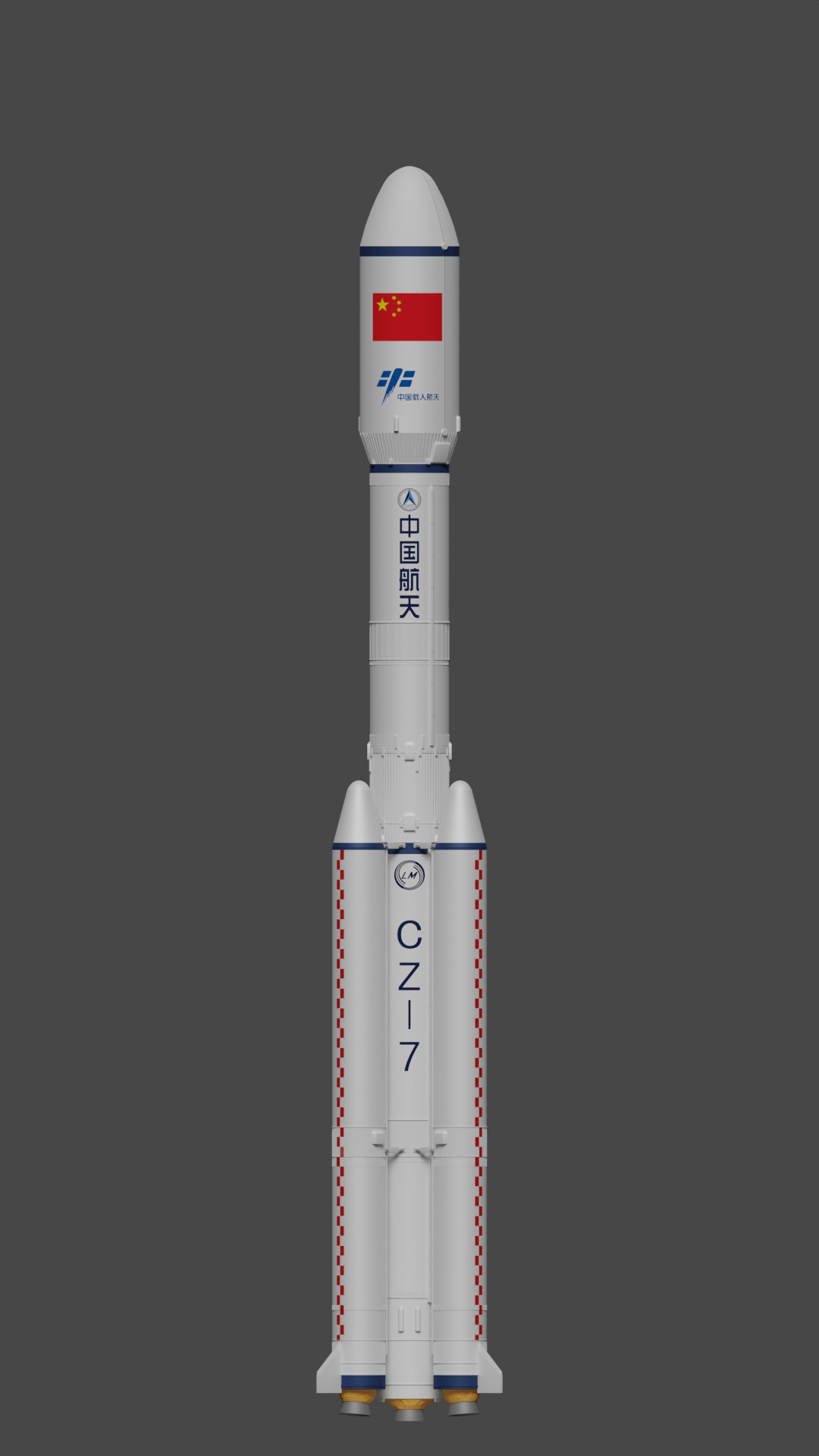
Rendering of Long March 7

The Long March 7 project started in 2008 with the formation of the development team within the traditional designer of space launch vehicles, CALT. With the acquisition of the RD-120 technology and development of the YF-100 and YF-115 engines, the original plan was to re-engine the Long March 2F. The Long March 2F/H, as it would have been called, would "just" switch from N_{2}O_{4} / UDMH to a LOX / kerosene propellant and improved thrust engines to offer better performance. But the switch resulted in a cascade of changes that increased the project complexity significantly.

At the same time, the original Long March 5 project was expected to include heavy, medium and light versions. Since the Long March 2F/H and the medium Long March 5 had significant overlaps, it was decided to merge both projects. This way, the high reliability and flight legacy components and technologies of the Long March 2F were merged with the new technologies developed for the Long March 5. Although finished nearly at the same time, the Long March 6 was a completely separate product developed by a young team within SAST. As such, it shares little more than tank diameters and propulsion with the LM-5 and LM7, but does cover the range of payloads between the medium Long March 7 and the very light Long March 11.

In 2010, the project name was changed officially to Long March 7. According to the project deputy manager, Zhang Tao, the project required eleven new major technologies. But the innovation was not only at the product level, but one at the process itself. This was, according to the project manager, Wang Xiaojun, the first time the whole process was developed in digital 3D, using computer-aided design directly to computer-aided manufacturing.

The inaugural flight was successfully performed on 25 June 2016, at 12:00 UTC from the Wenchang, LC-2 launch pad. It launched in the LM-7 configuration with the addition of the simultaneously debuting Yuanzheng-1A upper stage; the flight performed its multi-orbit mission successfully.

== Design ==
The Long March 7 is the medium-lift variant of a new generation rocket family that includes the heavier-lift Long March 5 and the small-mid cargo Long March 6. The structure is based on the reliable, human-rated Long March 2F launch vehicle. It inherited the 3.35 m-diameter core stage and 2.25 m-diameter liquid rocket boosters, but with new engines. Where the earlier Long March 2 rocket family used expensive and dangerous N_{2}O_{4} / UDMH propellants, the Long March 7 uses LOX and kerosene. The engines are shared with the Long March 5 and 6. The goal was to build a more cost-effective and less hazardous rocket family to replace today's Long March 2 and eventually the Long March 3. It is capable of placing a 5,500 kg (12,100 lb) payload into a Sun-synchronous orbit (SSO) of 700 km (430 mi).

=== Stages ===
The Long March 7 inherits the modular stages of the original Long March 5 project. As such, its first stage is the same module as the LM-5 boosters. It also shares tank diameters and engines with the Long March 6, but the design groups were completely different. The LM-5 and LM-7 were developed by China Academy of Launch Vehicle Technology (CALT), while the LM-6 was done by Shanghai Academy of Spaceflight Technology (SAST). Even the avionics are different.

The basic Long March 7 can be optimized by varying the number of boosters or enhanced by the addition of upper stages. These stages allow more mission flexibility, like direct injection to higher orbits or multiple orbit deployment. They can also increase the performance significantly. Thanks to this modularity, performance can be dialed between 4,000 kg (8,800 lb) and 13,500 kg (29,800 lb) for LEO, 2,000 kg (4,400 lb) and 8,000 kg (18,000 lb) for SSO and 4,000 kg (8,800 lb) and 7,000 kg (15,000 lb) to Geostationary transfer orbit (GTO).

==== Boosters ====
The Long March 7 can use 0, 2 or 4 boosters using RP-1 / LOX propellant. They are powered by a single oxidizer-rich staged combustion YF-100 engine. Each boosters supplies 1,200 kN (270,000 lb_{f}) at sea level and 1,340 kN (300,000 lb_{f}) in vacuum of thrust. Its specific impulse is 300 s (2.9 km/s) at sea level and 335 s (3.29 km/s) in vacuum. Each module has its own single axis thrust vector control, and thus it required a special design in the control systems of the rocket to coordinate all the rocket's nozzles. They use the legacy 2.25 m (7 ft 5 in) width of the Long March 2 and Long March 3 families, but due to the increased thrust of the YF-100 with respect to the YF-20 and YF-25, the boosters are almost twice as long, at 27 m (89 ft).

Re-entry of a Long March 7 rocket booster created a fireball visible from portions of Utah, Nevada, Colorado, Idaho and California on the evening of 27 July 2016; its disintegration was widely reported on social media, and the uncontrolled re-entry of such a five-ton object was regarded as a rare event.

==== First stage ====
The first stage has 3.35 m (11.0 ft) diameter tanks carrying RP-1/LOX propellant. It is powered by two YF-100 engines, sharing the same propulsion elements as the boosters, only that for the first stage the engines can gimbal in two axes. Also, this first stage is the same basic module as the Long March 5 boosters. The diameter was designed for land transport and as such, it will be able to launch from all the Chinese launch sites. This is a critical difference to the LM-5 that requires water transport for its 5 m (16 ft) diameter core stages. While it shares diameter and engines with the Long March 6 first stage, the development was completely separated and done by different groups.

==== Second stage ====
The second stage also shares the first 3.35 m (11.0 ft) diameter tanks and propellant. It is powered by four oxidizer-rich staged combustion RP-1/LOX YF-115 engines. Two are fixed and two can gimbal in two axes. It offers 706 kN (159,000 lb_{f}) of thrust in vacuum with a specific impulse of 341.5 s (3.349 km/s). While it shares engines with the Long March 6 second stage, the development were completely separated and done by different groups.

=== Optional stages ===
==== Yuanzheng-1A ====
It can use the Yuanzheng-1A upper stage to increase payload to higher energy orbits and enable multiple ignition missions. Particularly, allows direct injection to SSO orbits. The inaugural flight successfully used this upper stage to deliver multiple payloads to different orbits.

==== Hydrogen stage ====
The Long March 7 is expected to be enhanced by a high-energy liquid hydrogen and liquid oxygen stage. This stage and the low inclination of Wenchang would enable to launch payload between 4,000 kg (8,800 lb) and 7,000 kg (15,000 lb) to Geostationary transfer orbit (GTO) orbit. That would be a 25% increase with respect to the previously most powerful Chinese launcher, the Long March 3B, but well below the Long March 5. The Long March 7A variant, active since March 2020, accomplishes just this enhancement; it is made of the initial two stages of Long March 7, with a third stage powered by liquid hydrogen and liquid oxygen.

In the 2013 presentation of variations, a hydrogen-powered stage was also used as a second stage. It was not clear if it would be the same stage used as the second stage or a different stage. In both cases (second and third stage) they would be powered by the YF-75 or the YF-75D.

==== Solid boosters ====
The 2013 presentation of the variation also proposed smaller 2 m (6 ft 7 in) diameter solid boosters as a cheaper option for smaller payloads.

=== Avionics ===
After the inaugural flight, Song Zhengyu, Deputy Chief Control Systems Designer for the Long March 7 project, stated that the flight had proven indigenous avionics. They had to work with the local industry to develop space rated dual processor PLCs. It was also stated that the real-time operating system was also an indigenous development. The general design was based on a distributed architecture to enable scalability and fault tolerance. This avionics would be the base for most future developments and had been designed with reusability in mind.

== 2013 proposed variations ==
In a paper published on the Manned Spaceflight publication of the CMSEO, the Long March 7 was presented as a family of launch vehicles. The variations would be codified by a two number plus variable letters code, and a CZ-7 prefix in the form CZ-7##. The first digit would mean the number of stages in the core, which could be either 2 or 3. The second number would mean the number of boosters, which could be 0, 2 or 4, with an S appended if the boosters were of solid type. There was also proposed an alternative second stage powered by the LH/LOX propellant and dual YF-75 engines would be identified by appending an (HO) to the designation. At last, it could have an additional upper stage, later identified as the Yuanzheng-1A, that would be identified by appending to the designation /SM.

For example, the version that debuted was codified under this nomenclature as the CZ-724/SM, since it had two RP-1/LOX core stages, four liquid boosters and was enhanced by the Yuanzheng-1A stage. A CZ-720 would have two RP-1/LOX stages and no boosters. A CZ-724S(HO) would have a RP-1/LOX first stage, a LH/LOX second stage and four solid boosters. A CZ-732 would have two RP-1/LOX stages, a LH/LOX third stage, and two liquid boosters. The paper expected the following performance from certain versions.

Version	LEO	SSO	GTO
CZ-720	2000 kg	–	
CZ-722	7500 kg	1300 kg	
CZ-724	13500 kg	5500 kg	
CZ-720/SM		1000 kg	
CZ-722/SM		4500 kg	
CZ-724/SM		8500 kg	
CZ-722S/SM		1800 kg	
CZ-724S/SM		3900 kg	
CZ-730			1200 kg
CZ-732			4500 kg
CZ-734			7000 kg
CZ-720(HO)	5500 kg	2900 kg	1500 kg
CZ-722S(HO)	7500 kg	4400 kg	2400 kg

The paper also presented the propulsion options for each stage. The RP-1/LOX second stage had only two YF-115 instead of the normal four, when used in the version with no boosters. It might have implied a different smaller upper stage or an under filled one.

Version	Boosters	1st Stage	2nd Stage	3rd Stage	Maneuver Stage
CZ-720	—N/a	YF-100 × 2	YF-115 × 2	—N/a	—N/a
CZ-722	2.25 m liquid × 2	YF-100 × 2	YF-115 × 4	—N/a	—N/a
CZ-724	2.25 m liquid × 4	YF-100 × 2	YF-115 × 4	—N/a	—N/a
CZ-720/SM	—N/a	YF-100 × 2	YF-115 × 2	—N/a	YF-50 × 1
CZ-722/SM	2.25 m liquid × 2	YF-100 × 2	YF-115 × 4	—N/a	YF-50 × 1
CZ-724/SM	2.25 m liquid × 4	YF-100 × 2	YF-115 × 4	—N/a	YF-50 × 1
CZ-722S/SM	2 m solid × 2	YF-100 × 2	YF-115 × 4	—N/a	YF-50 × 1
CZ-724S/SM	2 m solid × 4	YF-100 × 2	YF-115 × 4	—N/a	YF-50 × 1
CZ-720(HO)	—N/a	YF-100 × 2	YF-75 × 2	—N/a	—N/a
CZ-722(HO)	2.25 m liquid × 2	YF-100 × 2	YF-75 × 2	—N/a	—N/a
CZ-724(HO)	2.25 m liquid × 4	YF-100 × 2	YF-75 × 2	—N/a	—N/a
CZ-722S(HO)	2 m solid × 2	YF-100 × 2	YF-75 × 2	—N/a	—N/a
CZ-724S(HO)	2 m solid × 4	YF-100 × 2	YF-75 × 2	—N/a	—N/a
CZ-730	—N/a	YF-100 × 2	YF-115 × 2	YF-75 × 2	—N/a
CZ-732	2.25 m liquid × 2	YF-100 × 2	YF-115 × 4	YF-75 × 2	—N/a
CZ-734	2.25 m liquid × 4	YF-100 × 2	YF-115 × 4	YF-75 × 2	—N/a

== CZ-7A variant ==
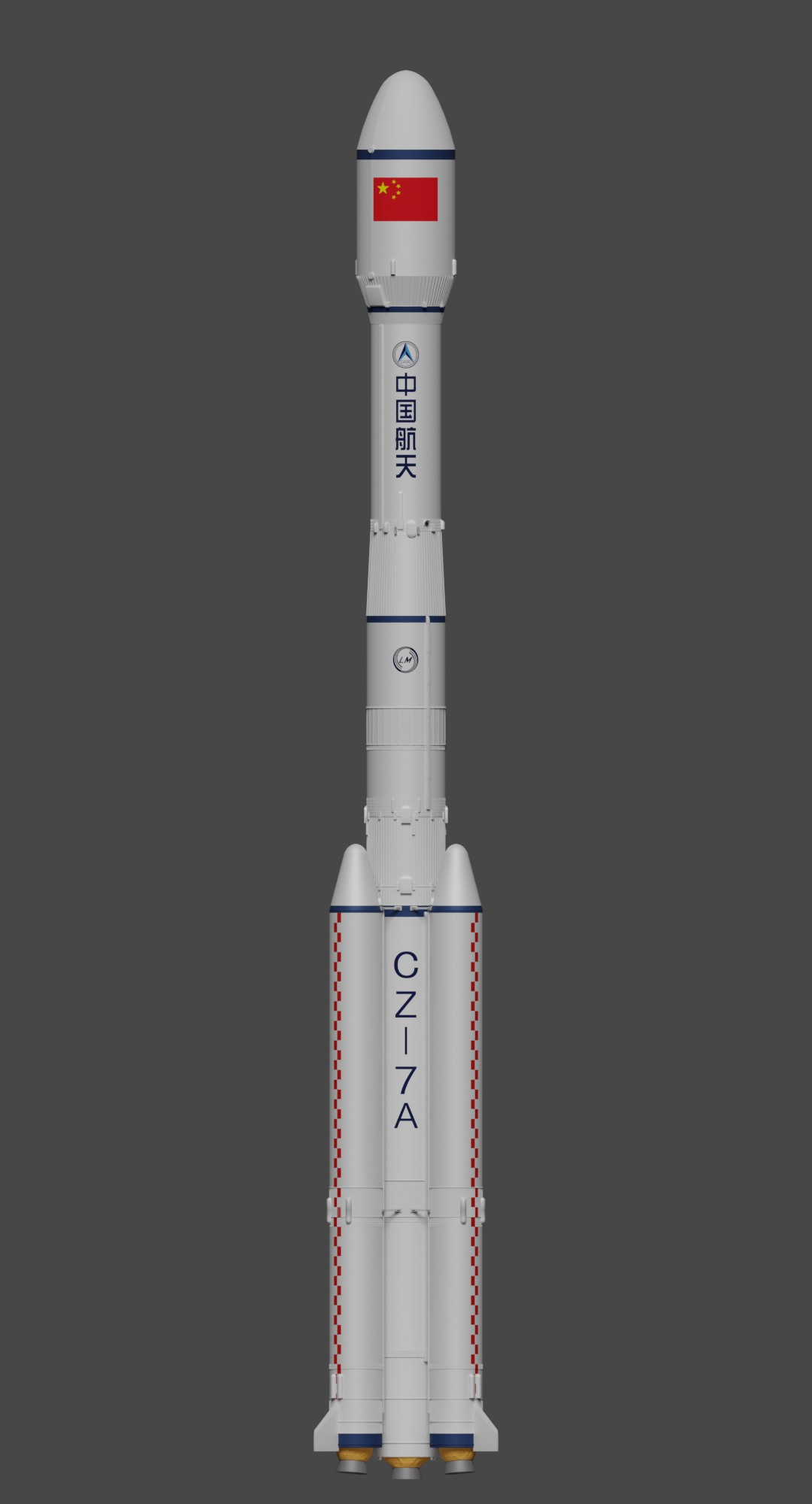
Rendering of CZ-7A

Since 2020, the base two-stage CZ-7 configuration has been supplemented by the three-stage CZ-7A variant. This variant employs the boosters and the first two stages of the base configuration, and add to this a third stage that employs two cryogenic YF-75 engines operating on LH_{2} and LOX liquid fuels; the third stage of the 7A variant is inherited from the third stage of the Long March 3B. (Note that the 7A variant is similar to the CZ-73X variants first proposed in 2013; see previous subsection).

The maiden CZ-7A was launched on 16 March 2020 at 13:34 UTC from Wenchang Satellite Launch Center on Hainan island. Two hours after launch, state news sources announced that the flight ended in failure; no causes for the failure were indicated initially. Launch preparations for the maiden flight continued in the weeks prior to launch despite measures taken to combat the spread of the COVID-19 virus in China. In 2021, some observers speculated, based on unconfirmed Chinese Baidu posts, that the failure of the CZ-7A's maiden flight was caused by the loss of pressurization in one of its four boosters just prior to main engine cutoff and the staging of the first stage (about 168 seconds into the flight).

The second CZ-7A launched successfully from Wenchang on 11 March 2021. The launch vehicle carried the Shiyan-9 satellite to test new technologies such as space environmental monitoring, according to the China Aerospace Science and Technology Corporation (CASC).

== Launch statistics ==
Launch outcomes

- Failure
- Partial failure
- Success
- Planned

== List of launches ==
Flight number	Date (UTC)	Variant	Launch site	Payload	Orbit	Result	Ref
Y1	25 June 2016; 12:00	7 with YZ-1A	Wenchang, LC-2	Next-Generation Crew Capsule Scale Model • Star of Aoxiang • Aolong-1 • Tiange-1 • Tiange-2	LEO	Success	
Y2	20 April 2017; 11:41	7	Wenchang, LC-2	Tianzhou 1	LEO	Success	
7A-Y1	16 March 2020; 13:34	7A	Wenchang, LC-2	XJY 6	GTO	Failure	
7A-Y2	11 March 2021; 17:51	7A	Wenchang, LC-2	Shiyan 9	GTO	Success	
Y3	29 May 2021; 12:55	7	Wenchang, LC-2	Tianzhou 2	LEO	Success	
Y4	20 September 2021; 07:10	7	Wenchang, LC-2	Tianzhou 3	LEO	Success	
7A-Y3	23 December 2021; 10:12	7A	Wenchang, LC-2	Shiyan 12-01; Shiyan 12-02	GTO	Success	
Y5	9 May 2022; 17:56	7	Wenchang, LC-2	Tianzhou 4	LEO	Success	
7A-Y5	13 September 2022; 13:18	7A	Wenchang, LC-2	ChinaSat 1E	GTO	Success	
Y6	12 November 2022; 02:03	7	Wenchang, LC-2	Tianzhou 5	LEO	Success	
7A-Y4	8 January 2023; 22:00	7A	Wenchang, LC-2	Shijian 23	GTO	Success	
Y7	10 May 2023; 13:22	7	Wenchang, LC-2	Tianzhou 6	LEO	Success	
7A-Y6	3 November 2023; 14:54	7A	Wenchang, LC-2	TJS-10	GTO	Success	
Y8	17 January 2024; 14:27	7	Wenchang, LC-2	Tianzhou 7	LEO	Success	
7A-Y8	29 June 2024; 11:57	7A	Wenchang, LC-2	ChinaSat 3A	GTO	Success	
7A-Y9	22 August 2024; 12:25	7A	Wenchang, LC-2	ChinaSat 4A	GTO	Success	
Y9	15 November 2024; 15:13	7	Wenchang, LC-2	Tianzhou 8	LEO	Success	
7A-Y11	29 March 2025; 16:05	7A	Wenchang, LC-2	TJS-16	GTO	Success	
7A-Y15	20 May 2025; 11:50	7A	Wenchang, LC-2	ChinaSat 3B	GTO	Success	
Y10	14 July 2025; 21:34	7	Wenchang, LC-2	Tianzhou 9	LEO	Success	
7A-Y14	9 September 2025; 02:00	7A	Wenchang, LC-2	Yaogan 45	MEO	Success	
7A-Y13	3 November 2025; 03:47	7A	Wenchang, LC-2	Yaogan 46	MEO	Success	
7A-Y10	30 November 2025; 12:20	7A	Wenchang, LC-2	Shijian 28	GTO	Success	
7A-Y7	30 December 2025; 22:40	7A	Wenchang, LC-2	Shijian 29 A & B	GTO	Success	
Y11	11 May 2026; 00:14	7	Wenchang, LC-2	Tianzhou 10	LEO	Success	
7A-Y12	26 May 2026; 16:16	7A	Wenchang, LC-2	TJS-24	GTO	Success	
7A-Y20	23 June 2026; 02:10	7A	Wenchang, LC-2	TJS-26A	GTO	Success	
7A-Y29	29 July 2026; 11:50	7A	Wenchang, LC-2	Tianlian 3-01	GTO	Success	
7A-Y16	10 August 2026; 12:02	7A	Wenchang, LC-2	ChinaSat-4B	GTO	Failure	

== See also ==
- List of Long March launches (2025-2029)
