= Tianhe core module =

Module of the Tiangong space station

Tianhe
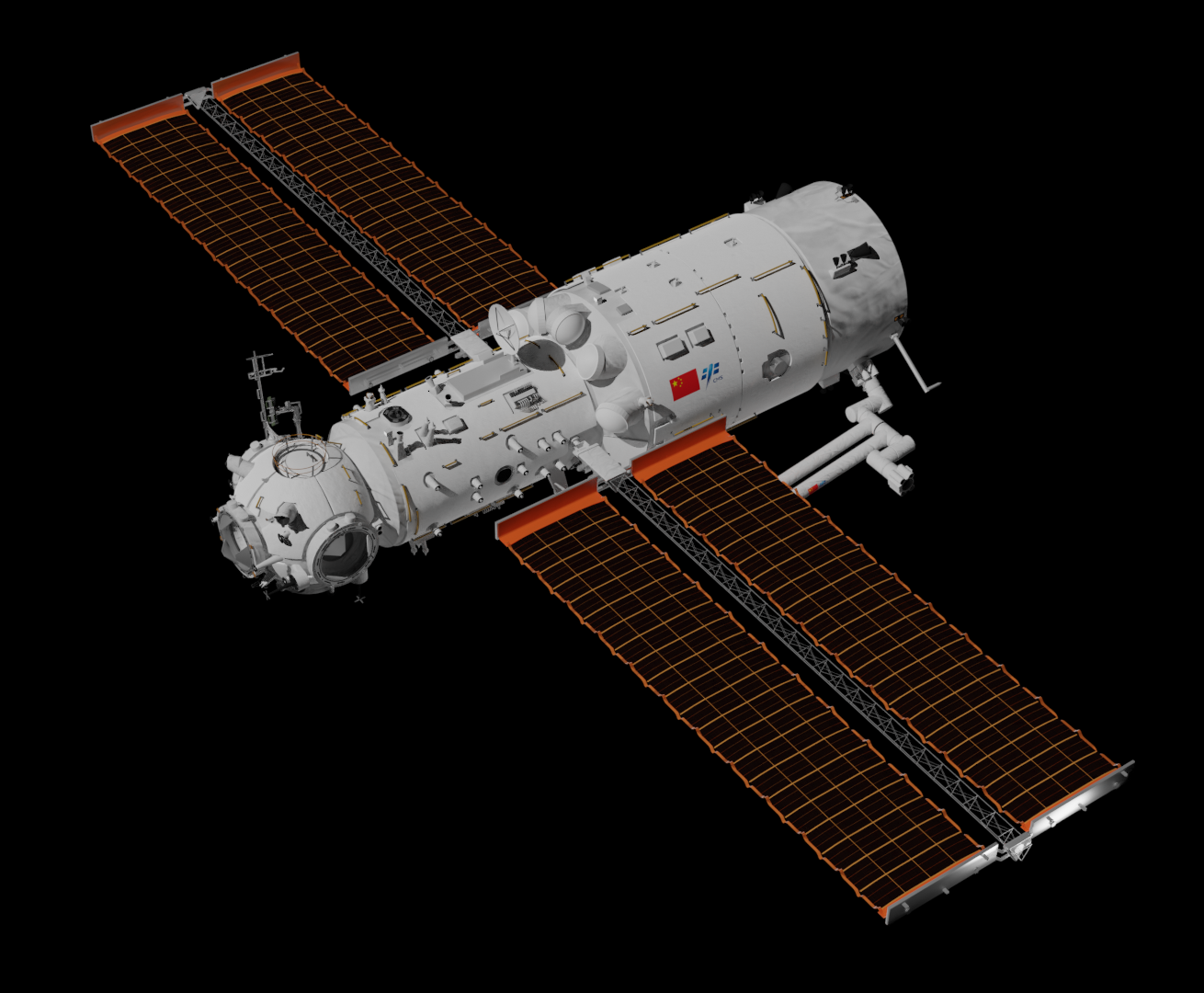
- Rendering of the Tianhe core module

Module statistics
- COSPAR ID: 2021-035A
- Part of: Tiangong space station
- Launch date: 29 April 2021, 03:23:15 UTC (11:23:15 CST)
- Launch vehicle: Long March 5B (5B-Y2)
- Mass: 22,500 kg (49,600 lb)
- Length: 16.6 m (54 ft)
- Width: 4.2 m (14 ft)
- Pressurised volume: 113 m^{3} (4,000 cu ft); Habitable: 51 m^{3} (1,800 cu ft)
- References: Insignia

Configuration
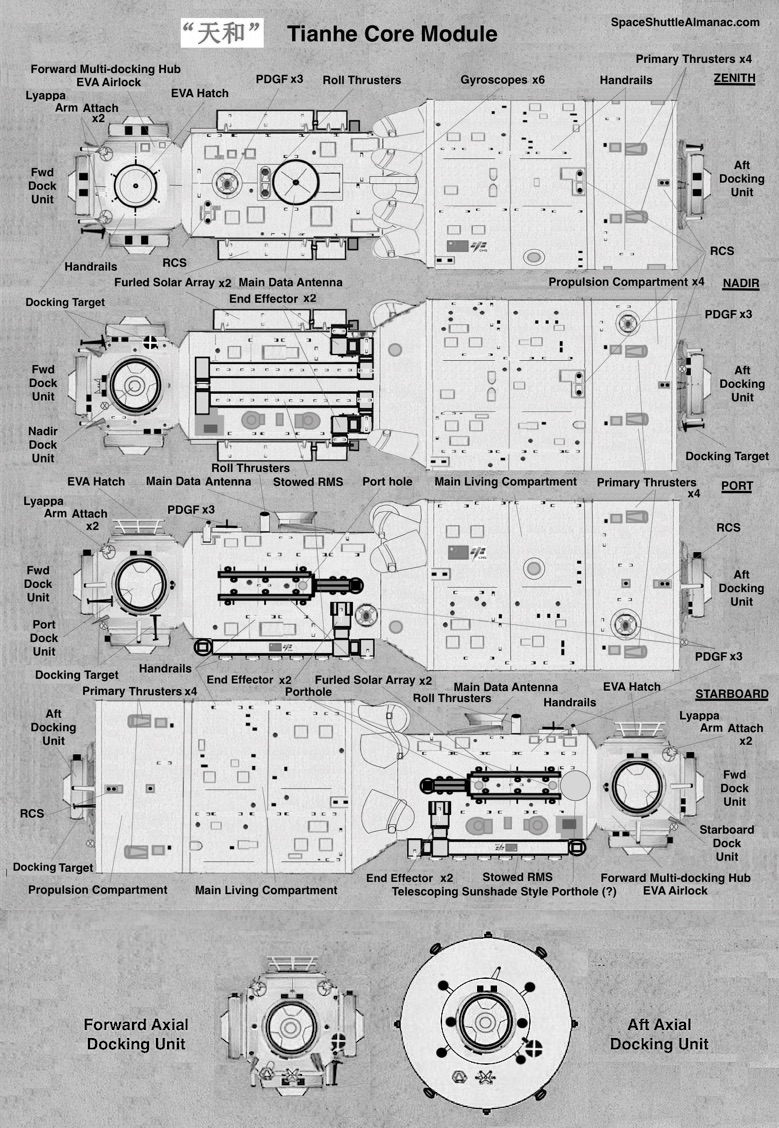
- Diagram of the Tianhe module

Tianhe (Chinese: 天和; pinyin: Tiānhé; lit. 'Harmony of the Heavens'), officially the Tianhe core module (Chinese: 天和核心舱), is the first module to launch of the Tiangong space station. It was launched into orbit on 29 April 2021, as the first launch of the final phase of Tiangong program, part of the China Manned Space Program (Project 921).

Tianhe follows the earlier Tiangong-1 and Tiangong-2 space laboratories. It is the first module of a third-generation Chinese modular space station. Other examples of modular stations include the Soviet/Russian Mir and the International Space Station. Operations will be controlled from the Beijing Aerospace Flight Control Center.

In 2018, a fullscale mockup of Tianhe was publicly presented at China International Aviation & Aerospace Exhibition in Zhuhai. In October 2020, China selected 18 new astronauts ahead of the space station construction to participate in the country's space station project.

== Functions and systems ==
The core module provides life support and living quarters for three crew members, and provides guidance, navigation, and orientation control for the station. The module also provides the station's power, propulsion, and life support systems. The module consists of three sections: habitable living quarters, a non-habitable service section, and a docking hub. The living quarters have a volume of 51 cubic metres (1,800 cu ft) of habitable space, compared to only 15 cubic metres (530 cu ft) for Tiangong-1.

The living quarters include a kitchen, toilet, fire control equipment, air processing and control equipment, computers, scientific apparatus, and ground communications equipment. The station has a large robotic arm called the Core Module Manipulator (CMM). The CMM has a wide range of mobility with seven axis of motion, the ability to be elongated, and crawl along the hull. According to the latest reports, its ability is similar to Canadarm 2.

Electrical power is provided by two steerable solar power arrays, which use photovoltaic cells to produce electricity. Energy is stored to power the station when it moves into the Earth's shadow. Tianzhou resupply ships replenish fuel for the module's propulsion engines for station-keeping to counter the effects of atmospheric drag. There are 4 ion engines for propulsion.

== Structure ==
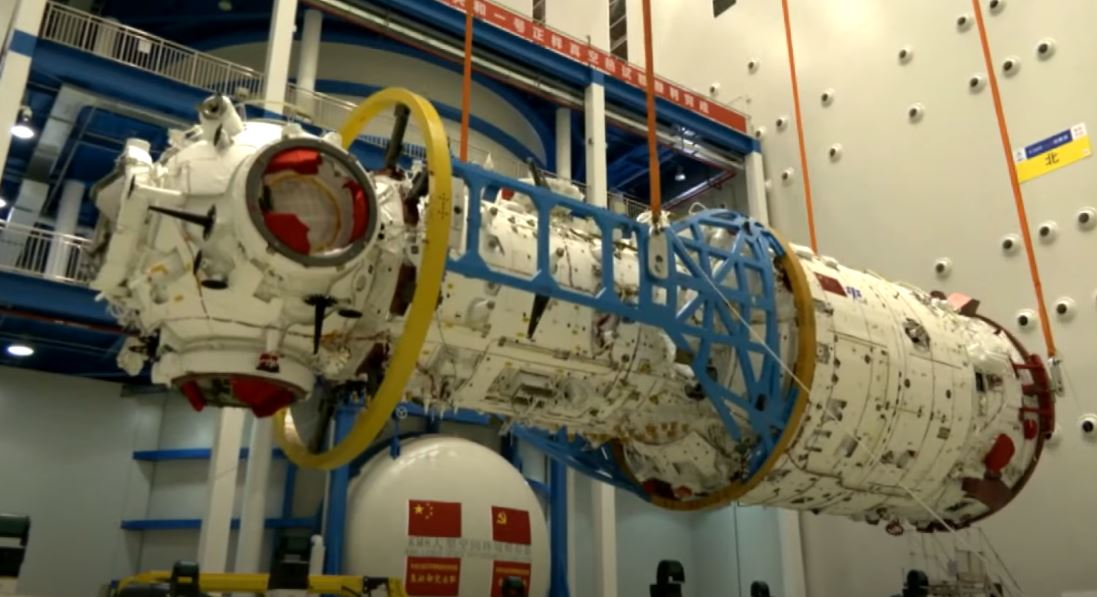
Tianhe core module being tested on the ground

The forward docking hub has four ports: forward, port, starboard, and nadir (towards Earth). The Mengtian and Wentian modules are semi-permanently attached to the port and starboard ports, respectively. The forward and nadir ports are used by visiting crewed Shenzhou spacecraft, while the aft-facing port at the other end of the module is used by Tianzhou cargo spacecraft. The forward, nadir, and aft ports are equipped with equipment for automated rendezvous and docking.

Each experiment module was designed to carry a mechanical arm similar to the Russian Lyappa arm used on the Mir space station. New modules would initially dock at the forward port before being relocated to the port or starboard port by the arm.

During the early stages of station assembly, the zenith port served as the station's extravehicular activity (EVA) hatch, with the docking hub acting as an airlock. This role became unnecessary after the addition of the Wentian module, which includes a dedicated EVA airlock.

Earlier first-generation space stations, including the Soviet Salyut 1, NASA's Skylab, and Tiangong-1, were not designed for routine resupply missions. Later stations such as Salyut 6, Salyut 7, and Mir introduced multiple docking ports to support long-term crewed operations and resupply missions. The modular design of the Tiangong space station allows additional modules to be added or removed over time. The station was designed for routine resupply and has a planned service life of at least 10 years.

The module is 16.6 m (54 ft) long, with a maximum diameter of 4.2 m (14 ft) and an on-orbit mass of 22,500 kg (49,600 lb).

== Launch ==
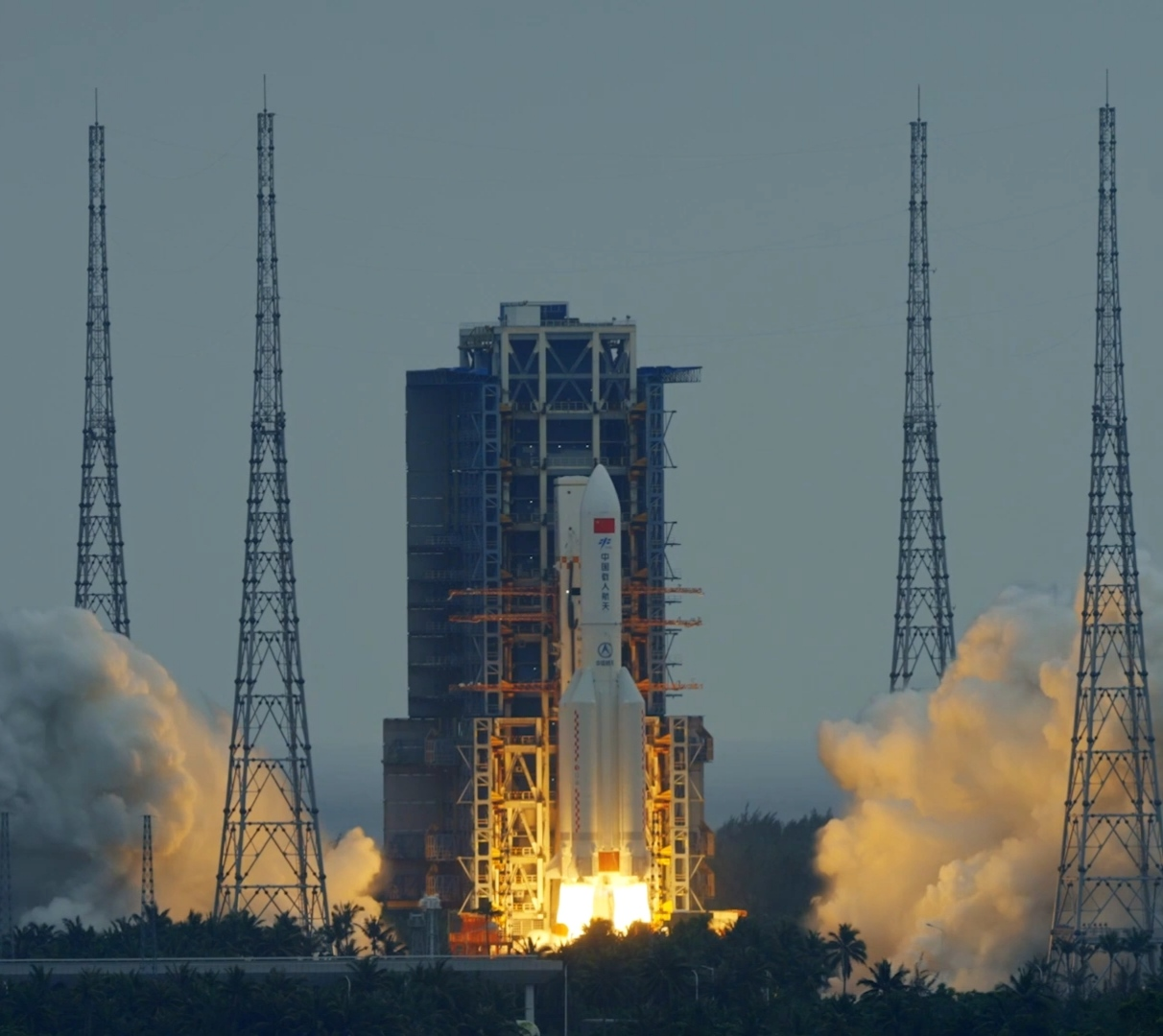
Launch of Tianhe

On 14 January 2021, CMSA announced the beginning of the construction phase for China's three-module space station. The core module, Tianhe, passed a flight acceptance review. This core module provides living space and life support for astronauts and houses the outpost's power and propulsion elements.

Tianhe launched on 29 April 2021, at 03:23:15 UTC atop a Long March 5B launch vehicle from the Wenchang Spacecraft Launch Site. After the core module was put into orbit, the empty first stage of its launch vehicle entered a temporary, uncontrolled failing orbit. Some concerns were raised over possible damage from debris of the uncontrolled re-entry: observations showed the rocket was tumbling, which complicates predictions about an eventual landing area, although the most likely outcome was a maritime impact. Parallels were made with respect to a previous launch in May 2020 which reportedly caused some damage in the Côte d'Ivoire. The rocket re-entered over the Arabian peninsula on 9 May at 02:24 UTC, landing in the Indian Ocean west of the Maldives according to the CMSA, with much of it having reportedly burned up prior to impact. (Note: China Manned Space Engineering Office (CMSEO) reported landing coordinates are 72.47 degrees of longitude east and 2.65 degrees of latitude north – 2.65°N 72.47°E.) United States Space Command confirmed the re-entry location. (Note: 'Space-Track.org', on its Twitter feed, stated that based on data from the 18th Space Control Squadron of the United States Space Force, the CZ-5B core stage that launched the Tianhe core module fell into the Indian Ocean north of the Maldives.)

The first spacecraft scheduled that visited the Tianhe core module was the Tianzhou 2 cargo resupply spacecraft on 29 May 2021, followed by Shenzhou 12, carrying a crew of three to the station on 17 June 2021. Tianzhou 3 and Shenzhou 13 were launched to the station on 20 September 2021 and 15 October 2021 respectively.

== Dockings ==
- All dates are UTC. Dates are the earliest possible dates and may change.
- Forward ports are at the front of the station according to its normal direction of travel and orientation (attitude). Aft is at the rear of the station, used by spacecraft to boost the station's orbit. Nadir is closest to the Earth, zenith is on top. Port is to the left if pointing one's feet towards the Earth and looking in the direction of travel; starboard to the right.

Key

Uncrewed cargo spacecraft are in light blue colour
Crewed spacecraft are in light green colour
Modules are in beige colour

Launch (UTC)	Docking (UTC)	Undocking (UTC)	Result	Spacecraft/Module	Location	Duration (Note: Duration of a spacecraft is calculated from the moment of docking with the Tianhe core module to the moment of undocking with the station.)
29 April 2021; 03:23:15	—N/a	—N/a	Success	Tianhe	—N/a	—N/a
29 May 2021; 12:55:29	29 May 2021; 21:01	27 March 2022; 07:59	Success	Tianzhou 2	Tianhe port (Note: Initially docked to aft port, moved to forward port on 18 September 2021, and then again to portside port on 6 January 2022)	301d, 10h, 58m
17 June 2021; 01:22:27	17 June 2021; 07:54	16 September 2021; 00:56	Success	Shenzhou 12	Tianhe forward	90d, 14h, 8m
20 September 2021; 07:10:11	20 September 2021; 14:08	17 July 2022; 02:59	Success	Tianzhou 3	Tianhe forward (Note: Initially docked to aft port, moved to forward port on 20 April 2022)	299d, 12h, 51m
15 October 2021; 16:23:56	15 October 2021; 22:56	15 April 2022; 16:44	Success	Shenzhou 13	Tianhe nadir	181d, 14h, 46m
9 May 2022; 17:56:37	10 May 2022; 00:54	9 November 2022; 06:55	Success	Tianzhou 4	Tianhe aft	183d, 6h, 1m
5 June 2022; 02:44:10	5 June 2022; 09:42	4 December 2022; 03:01	Success	Shenzhou 14	Tianhe nadir	181d, 14h, 11m
24 July 2022; 06:22:32	24 July 2022; 19:13	—N/a	Success	Wentian	Tianhe starboard (Note: Initially docked to forward port, it was moved to starboard berth on 30 September 2022 by the Indexing Robot Arm)	—N/a
31 October 2022; 07:37:23	31 October 2022; 20:27	—N/a	Success	Mengtian	Tianhe port (Note: Initially docked to forward port, it was moved to the port berth on 3 November 2022 by the Indexing Robot Arm)	—N/a
12 November 2022; 02:03:12	12 November 2022; 04:10	11 September 2023; 08:46	Success	Tianzhou 5	Tianhe forward (Note: Initially docked to aft port, from 5 May 2023, it was free-flying and co-orbiting the space station, then redocked to forward port on 5 June 2023)	303d, 4h, 36m
29 November 2022; 15:08:17	29 November 2022; 21:42	3 June 2023; 13:29	Success	Shenzhou 15	Tianhe forward	185d, 13h, 56m
10 May 2023; 13:22:51	10 May 2023; 21:16	12 January 2024; 08:02	Success	Tianzhou 6	Tianhe aft	246d, 10h, 46m
30 May 2023; 01:31:13	30 May 2023; 08:29	30 October 2023; 12:37	Success	Shenzhou 16	Tianhe nadir	153d, 2h, 15m
26 October 2023; 03:14:02	26 October 2023; 09:46	30 April 2024; 00:43	Success	Shenzhou 17	Tianhe forward	186d, 13h, 9m
17 January 2024; 14:27:30	17 January 2024; 17:46	10 November 2024; 08:30	Success	Tianzhou 7	Tianhe aft	297d, 14h, 44m
25 April 2024; 12:59:00	25 April 2024; 19:32	3 November 2024; 08:12	Success	Shenzhou 18	Tianhe nadir	191d, 11h, 8m
29 October 2024; 20:27:34	30 October 2024; 03:00	29 April 2025; 20:00	Success	Shenzhou 19	Tianhe forward	181d, 17h
15 November 2024; 15:13:18	15 November 2024; 18:32	8 July 2025; 07:09	Success	Tianzhou 8	Tianhe aft	234d, 12h, 37m
24 April 2025; 09:17	24 April 2025; 15:49	18 January 2026, 16:23	Partial failure (Note: Launched crewed, but landed uncrewed due to cracks in spacecraft's porthole caused by external space debris impact. Crew landed via Shenzhou 21.)	Shenzhou 20	Tianhe nadir	269d, 7h, 6m
14 July 2025; 21:34	14 July 2025; 21:34	6 May 2026; 08:34	Success	Tianzhou 9	Tianhe aft	295d, 11h
31 October 2025; 15:44	31 October 2025; 19:22	14 November 2025; 06:49	Success	Shenzhou 21	Tianhe forward	13d, 11h, 27m (Note: Landed with Shenzhou 20 crew due to cracks in Shenzhou 20 spacecraft's porthole caused by external space debris impact. Crew will land via Shenzhou 22.)
25 November 2025; 12:11	25 November 2025; 15:50	29 May 2026; 06:44	Success	Shenzhou 22	Tianhe forward	184d, 14h, 54m
11 May 2026; 00:14	11 May 2026; 05:11	TBA	In progress	Tianzhou 10	Tianhe aft	30d, 5h, 51m (in progress)
24 May 2026; 15:08	24 May 2026; 18:45	TBA	In progress	Shenzhou 23	Tianhe nadir	16d, 11h, 20m (in progress)

== Maneuvers ==
On 1 July 2021, the space station performed a maneuver in response to a possible close encounter with the Starlink-1095 communications satellite. Another maneuver was carried out on 21 October of the same year in response to a possible collision with Starlink-2305.

== Gallery ==
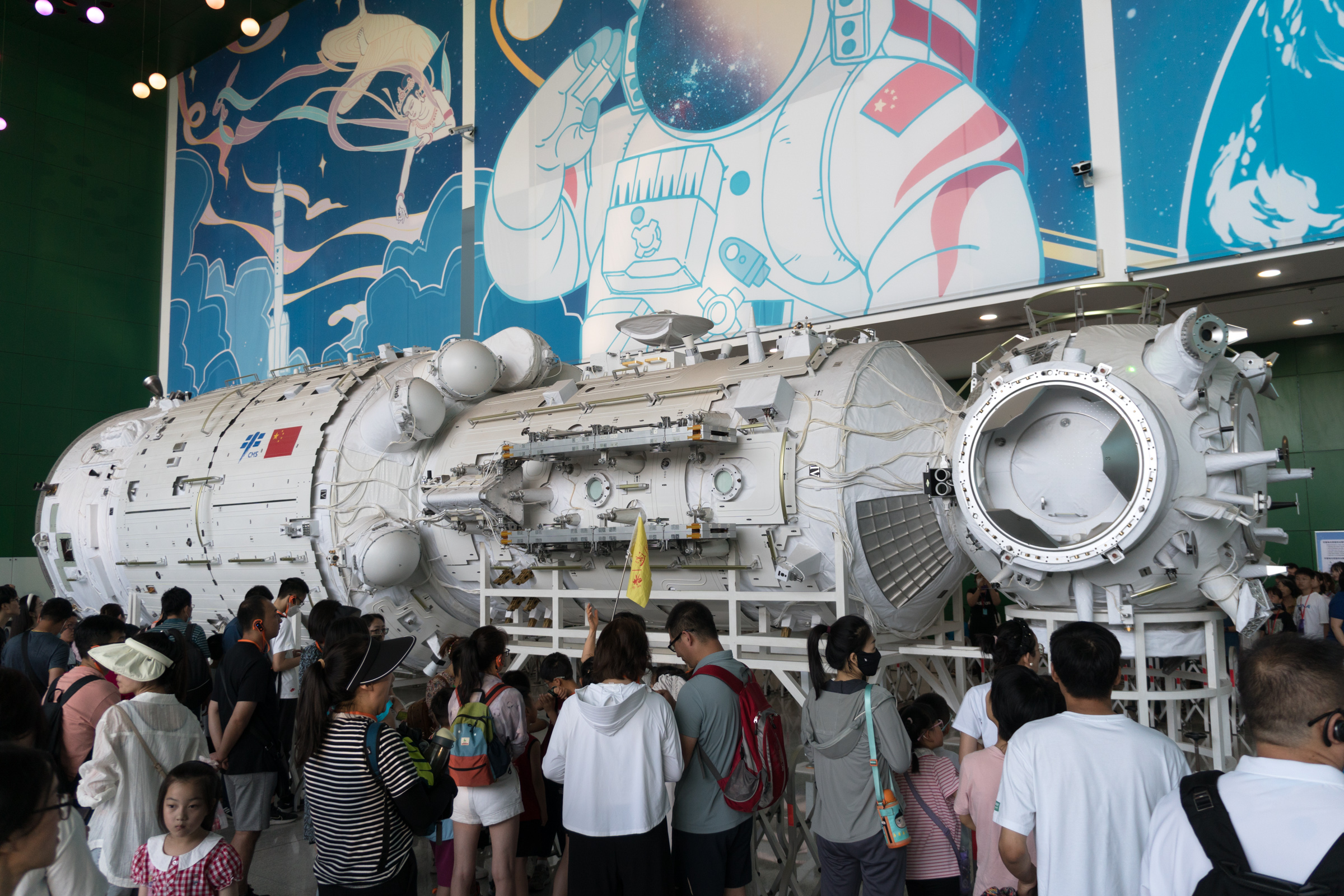
Tianhe core module full-scale mockup

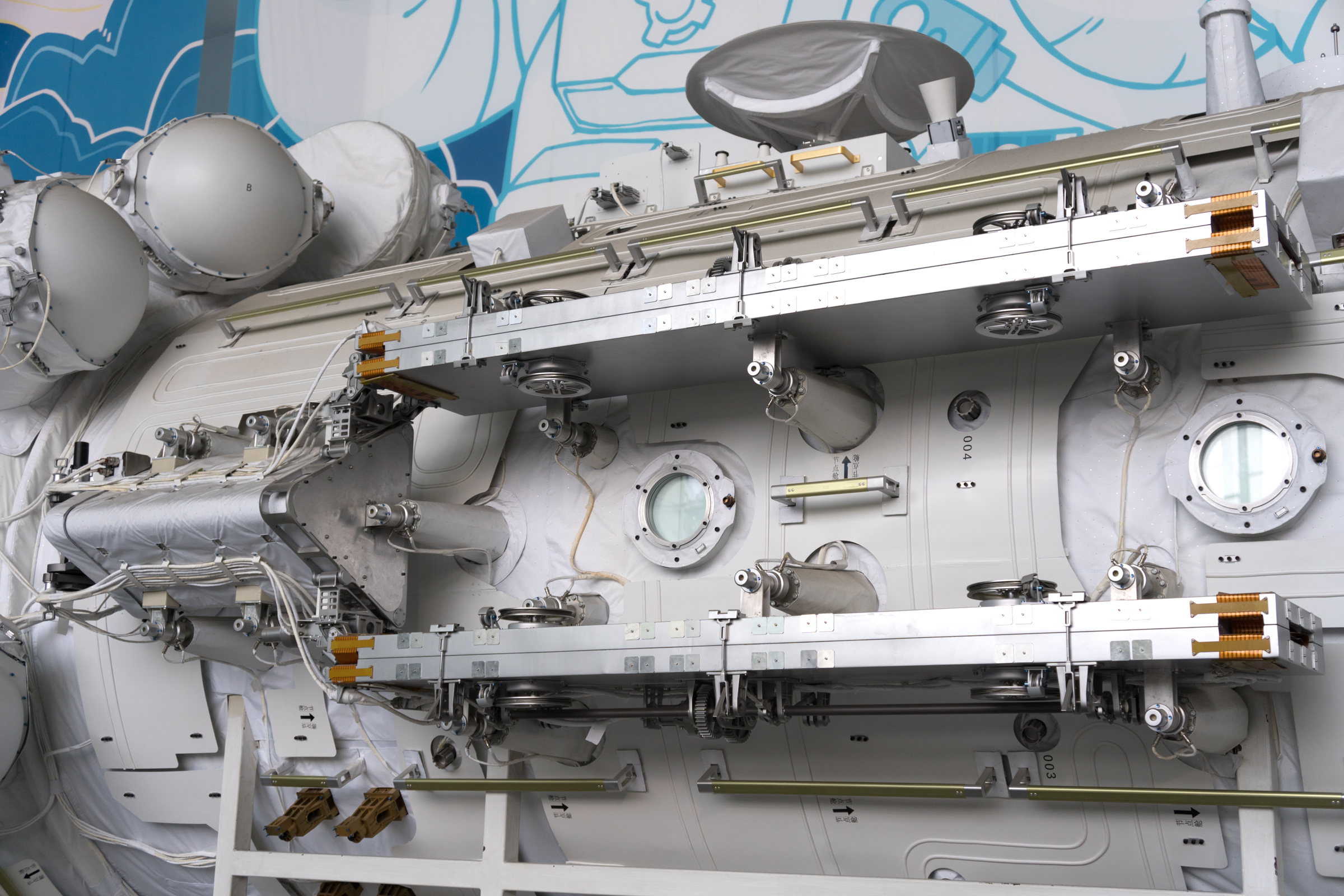
Folded solar panel on Tianhe core module full-scale mockup

== See also ==
- China Manned Space Program
- Wentian module
- Mengtian module
- Xuntian Space Telescope
