= Tianzhou 5 =

2022 Chinese resupply spaceflight to the Tiangong Space Station

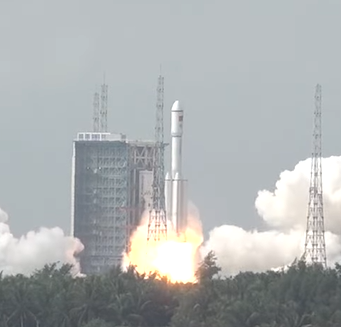
- Launch of Tianzhou 5
- Mission type: Tiangong space station resupply
- Operator: China National Space Administration
- COSPAR ID: 2022-152A
- SATCAT no.: 54237
- Mission duration: 304 days and 9 minutes

Spacecraft properties
- Spacecraft type: Tianzhou
- Manufacturer: China Aerospace Science and Technology Corporation
- Launch mass: 13,500 kg (29,800 lb)
- Dry mass: 6,700 kg (14,800 lb)
- Dimensions: 10.6 × 3.35 m (34.8 × 11.0 ft)

Start of mission
- Launch date: 12 November 2022, 02:03:12 UTC (10:03:12 CST)
- Rocket: Long March 7 (Y6)
- Launch site: Wenchang, LC-201
- Contractor: China Academy of Launch Vehicle Technology

End of mission
- Disposal: Deorbited
- Destroyed: 12 September 2023, 02:13 UTC

Orbital parameters
- Reference system: Geocentric orbit
- Regime: Low Earth orbit
- Perigee altitude: 380 km (240 mi)
- Apogee altitude: 386 km (240 mi)
- Inclination: 41.46°

Docking with Tiangong space station
- Docking port: Tianhe aft
- Docking date: 12 November 2022, 04:10 UTC
- Undocking date: 5 May 2023, 07:26 UTC
- Time docked: 174 days, 3 hours and 16 minutes

Docking with Tiangong space station (relocation) (Note: Tianzhou 5 was free flying for about 31 days between the arrival of Shenzhou 16 and the departure of Shenzhou 15, and then docked at Tiangong's forward port.)
- Docking port: Tianhe forward
- Docking date: 5 June 2023, 19:10 UTC
- Undocking date: 11 September 2023, 08:46 UTC
- Time docked: 97 days, 13 hours and 36 minutes
- Mission insignia Tianzhou program

Tianzhou 5 (Chinese: 天舟五号) was the fifth mission of the Tianzhou-class uncrewed cargo spacecraft, and the fourth resupply mission to the Tiangong Space Station. Like previous Tianzhou missions, the spacecraft was launched from the Wenchang Satellite Launch Center in Hainan, China on a Long March 7 rocket. It was successfully placed into orbit on 12 November and docked to the Tiangong space station on the same day. The rendezvous and docking process lasted 2 hours and 7 minutes, setting a world record for the fastest rendezvous and docking between a spacecraft and a space station, surpassing Soyuz MS-17's 3 hours and 3 minutes.

== Spacecraft ==
The Tianzhou cargo spacecraft has several notable differences with the Tiangong-1 from which it is derived. It has only three segments of solar panels (against 4 for Tiangong), but has 4 maneuvering engines (against 2 for Tiangong).
