= Shenzhou 11 =

2016 Chinese crewed spaceflight to Tiangong-2

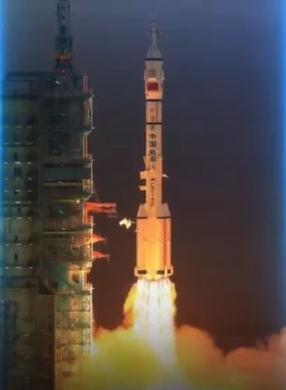
- Launch of Shenzhou 11 on a Long March 2F/G
- Mission type: Tiangong-2 crew transport
- Operator: China Manned Space Agency
- COSPAR ID: 2016-061A
- SATCAT no.: 41812
- Mission duration: 32 days, 6 hours, 29 minutes
- Orbits completed: 507

Spacecraft properties
- Spacecraft type: Shenzhou
- Manufacturer: China Aerospace Science and Technology Corporation

Crew
- Crew size: 2
- Members: Jing Haipeng; Chen Dong

Start of mission
- Launch date: 16 October 2016, 23:30:31 UTC (17 October, 07:30:31 CST)
- Rocket: Long March 2F/G (Y11)
- Launch site: Jiuquan, LA-4/SLS-1
- Contractor: China Academy of Launch Vehicle Technology

End of mission
- Landing date: 18 November 2016, 05:59:38 UTC
- Landing site: Inner Mongolia (42°29′11.7″N 112°42′57.36″E)

Orbital parameters
- Reference system: Geocentric orbit
- Regime: Low Earth orbit
- Perigee altitude: 379 km (235 mi)
- Apogee altitude: 389 km (242 mi)
- Inclination: 42.78°

Docking with Tiangong-2
- Docking date: 18 October 2016, 19:24 UTC
- Undocking date: 17 November 2016, 04:41 UTC
- Time docked: 29 days, 9 hours, 17 minutes
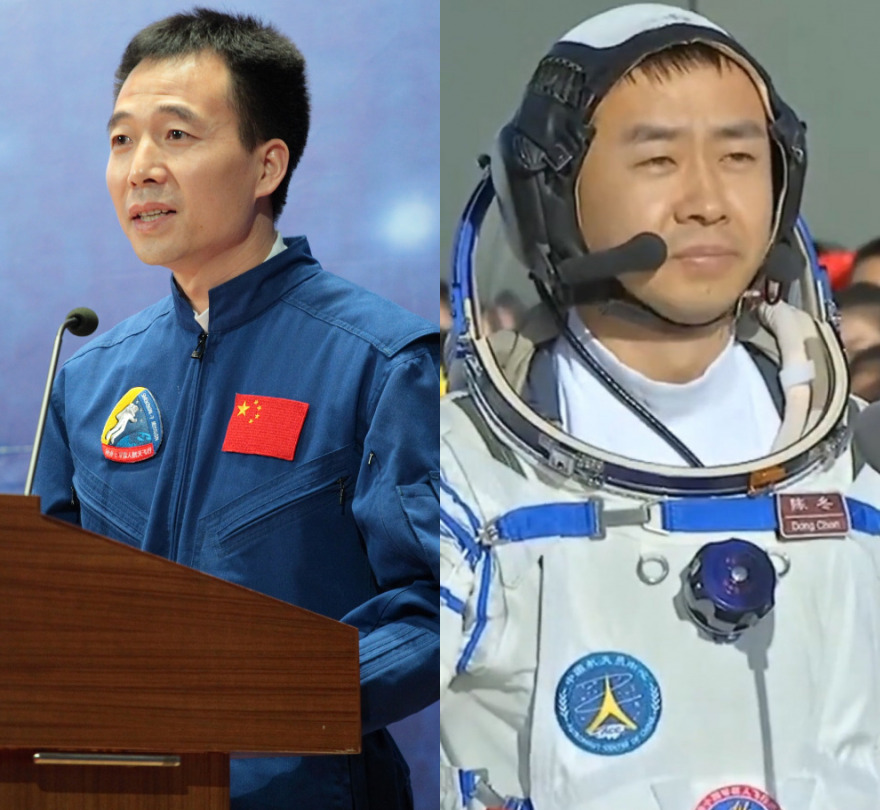
- Mission insignia Haipeng and Dong Shenzhou program

Shenzhou 11 (simplified Chinese: 神舟十一号; traditional Chinese: 神舟十一號; pinyin: Shénzhōu shíyī hào) was a crewed spaceflight of the Shenzhou program of China, launched on 17 October 2016 (16 October UTC) from the Jiuquan Satellite Launch Center. It was China's sixth crewed space mission, at 33 days, it was the longest until the follow-up Shenzhou 12 mission which lasted 3 months. Two days after launch, it docked with the Tiangong-2 space laboratory, which had been launched on 15 September 2016. Shenzhou 11 was the first and only expedition and mission to Tiangong-2 in this portion of the Tiangong program.

== Crew ==
The crew consisted of two taikonauts. The mission selected two crew instead of three to extend supplies to increase mission length. Commander Jing Haipeng celebrated his 50th birthday while in orbit.

Prime crew
Position	Crew
Commander	Jing Haipeng, PLAAC; Third spaceflight
Operator	Chen Dong, PLAAC; First spaceflight

Backup crew
Position	Crew
Commander	Deng Qingming, PLAAC
Operator	Tang Hongbo, PLAAC

== Mission ==
The Shenzhou 11 launched at 07:30 on 17 October 2016 local time (23:30 UTC on 16 October) from the Jiuquan Satellite Launch Center using a Long March 2F launch rocket.

The mission's main objective was to rendezvous and dock with the Tiangong-2 space laboratory and gain experience from a 30-day residence, and to test its life-support systems.

In the two days after the launch, it changed its orbit five times to arrive 52 kilometres behind the Tiangong-2 space lab. It autonomously rendezvoused and docked with Tiangong-2 at 3:24 p.m. EDT on 18 October 2016, while both spacecraft were at an altitude of 393 kilometres (244 mi).

The crew landed successfully after the 33-day mission on 18 November 2016. The reentry module of the Shenzhou 11 spacecraft landed in Dorbod Banner, Inner Mongolia around 2:15 p.m. (China time) after undocking from the space lab on 17 November.
