= Tianzhou 10 =

2026 Chinese resupply spaceflight

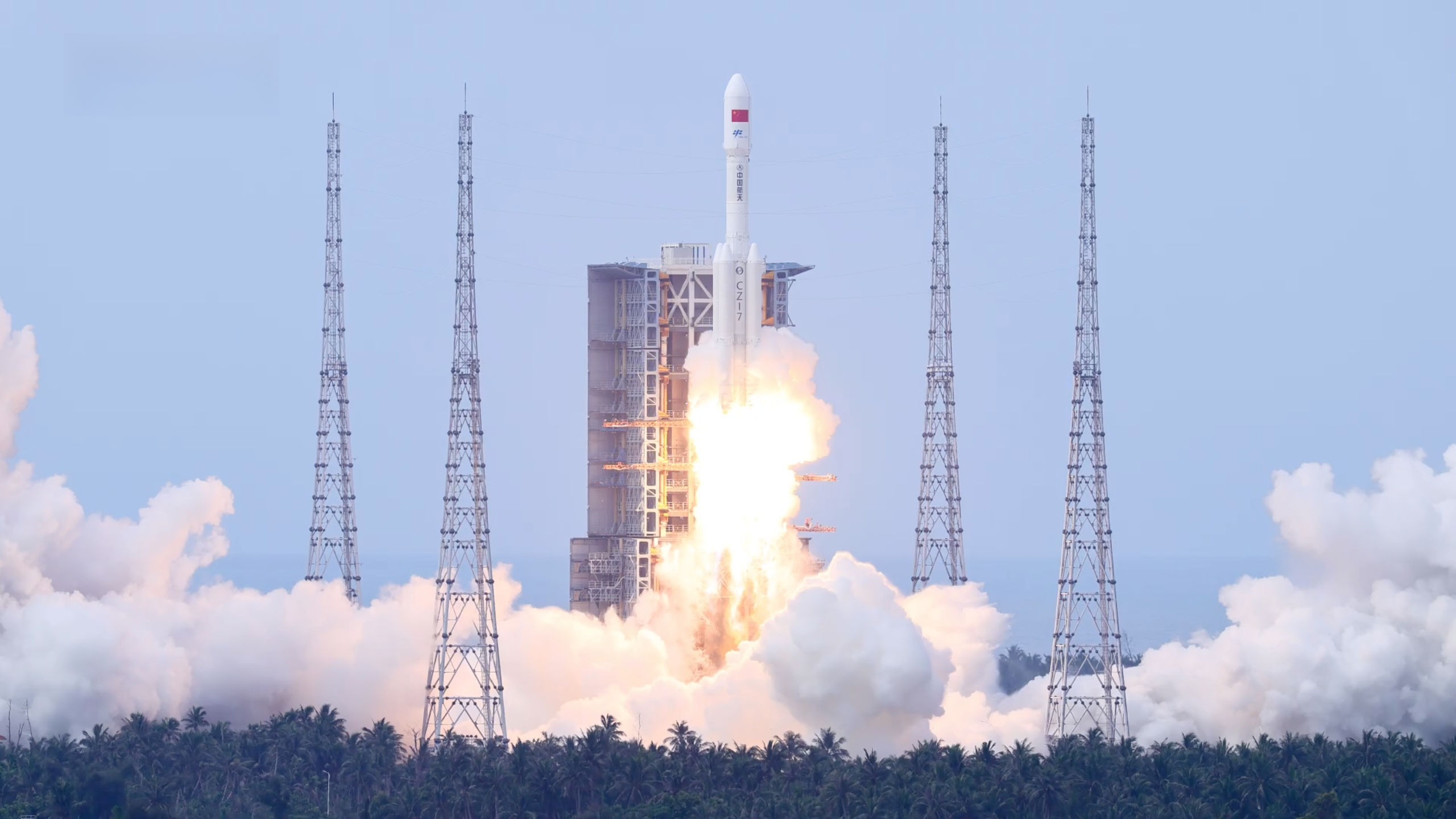
- Launch of Tianzhou 10 on Long March 7 flight Y11
- Mission type: Tiangong space station resupply
- Operator: China National Space Administration
- COSPAR ID: 2026-102A
- SATCAT no.: 69049
- Mission duration: 54 days, 3 hours and 3 minutes (in progress); 8 months (planned)

Spacecraft properties
- Spacecraft type: Tianzhou
- Manufacturer: China Aerospace Science and Technology Corporation
- Launch mass: 14,000 kg (31,000 lb)
- Dry mass: 7,400 kg (16,300 lb)
- Dimensions: 10.6 × 3.35 m (34.8 × 11.0 ft)

Start of mission
- Launch date: 11 May 2026, 00:14:32 UTC (08:14:32 CST)
- Rocket: Long March 7 (Y11)
- Launch site: Wenchang, LC-201
- Contractor: China Academy of Launch Vehicle Technology

End of mission
- Disposal: Deorbited (planned)

Orbital parameters
- Reference system: Geocentric orbit
- Regime: Low Earth orbit
- Perigee altitude: 380 km (240 mi)
- Apogee altitude: 385 km (239 mi)
- Inclination: 41.46°

Docking with Tiangong space station
- Docking port: Tianhe aft
- Docking date: 11 May 2026, 05:11 UTC
- Time docked: 53 days, 22 hours and 6 minutes (in progress)

Cargo
- Pressurised: 6,300 kg (13,900 lb)
- Fuel: 700 kg (1,500 lb)
- Mission insignia Tianzhou program

Tianzhou 10 (Chinese: 天舟十号) is the tenth mission of a Tianzhou uncrewed cargo spacecraft and the ninth resupply mission to the Tiangong space station. Like previous Tianzhou missions, the spacecraft was launched from the Wenchang Satellite Launch Center in Hainan, China, aboard a Long March 7 rocket. It carried the heaviest payload ever delivered by a Chinese cargo spacecraft.

== Mission history ==
The Tianzhou 10 cargo resupply craft was launched on 11 May 2026 at 00:14 UTC, and docked with the Tiangong space station at 5:11 UTC.
