= Tianzhou 1 =

2017 Chinese resupply spaceflight to Tiangong-2

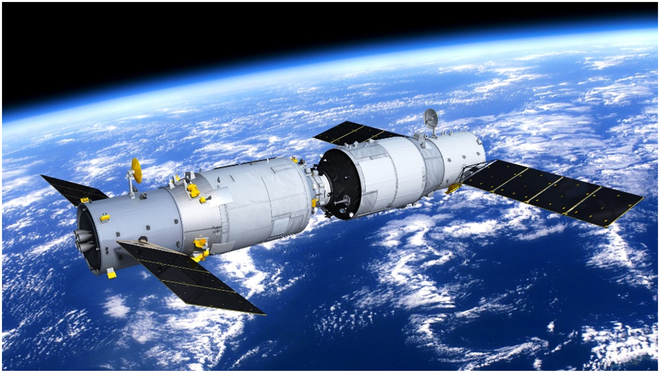
- A rendering of Tianzhou 1 (left) docked to Tiangong-2
- Mission type: Test flight / Tiangong-2 refueling
- Operator: China National Space Administration
- COSPAR ID: 2017-021A
- SATCAT no.: 42684
- Mission duration: 154 days

Spacecraft properties
- Spacecraft type: Tianzhou
- Manufacturer: China Aerospace Science and Technology Corporation
- Launch mass: <13,000 kg (29,000 lb)
- Dimensions: 9 × 3.35 m (29.5 × 11.0 ft)

Start of mission
- Launch date: 20 April 2017, 11:41:35 UTC (19:41:35 CST)
- Rocket: Long March 7 (Y2)
- Launch site: Wenchang, LC-2
- Contractor: China Academy of Launch Vehicle Technology

End of mission
- Disposal: Deorbited
- Destroyed: 22 September 2017

Orbital parameters
- Reference system: Geocentric orbit
- Regime: Low Earth orbit
- Perigee altitude: 369.65 km (229.69 mi)
- Apogee altitude: 378.4 km (235.1 mi)
- Inclination: 42.79°

Docking with Tiangong-2
- Docking date: 22 April 2017, 04:23 UTC
- Undocking date: 19 June 2017, 01:37 UTC
- Time docked: 57 days, 21 hours, 14 minutes

Docking with Tiangong-2 (test)
- Docking date: 19 June 2017, 06:55 UTC
- Undocking date: 21 June 2017, 01:16 UTC
- Time docked: 1 day, 18 hours, 21 minutes

Docking with Tiangong-2 (test)
- Docking date: 12 September 2017, 15:58 UTC
- Undocking date: 17 September 2017, 08:15 UTC
- Time docked: 4 days, 16 hours, 17 minutes

Tianzhou 1 (Chinese: 天舟一号) was the debut mission of the Tianzhou-class uncrewed cargo spacecraft. It was developed as part of the crewed space program of China. Tianzhou means "heavenly vessel" in Chinese. On 20 April 2017, Tianzhou 1 was launched by rocket Long March 7 at China Wenchang Spacecraft Launch Site. It successfully docked with the Tiangong-2 space laboratory on 22 April 2017 at 12:16 (UTC+8). Tianzhou 1 was deorbited on 22 September 2017. It plunged into Earth's atmosphere and burned up after a set of braking maneuvers under ground control.

== Spacecraft ==
It used the first flight model of the Tianzhou. It is a Chinese automated cargo spacecraft developed from the Tiangong-1 to resupply its future modular space station.

== Launch ==
Tianzhou 1 launched successfully on 20 April 2017 at 7:41 pm local time, from the Wenchang space center. This marked the second time a Long March 7 had been used and the first time for a mission. Tianzhou-1 became the heaviest Chinese spacecraft ever launched, at that time.

== Mission ==
This mission demonstrated the Tianzhou spacecraft and its capabilities. It critically demonstrated propellant transfer for the Chinese space station, the last big hurdle for long-duration expeditions. On April 22, 2017, Tianzhou 1 successfully docked with Tiangong 2 marking the first successful docking of a cargo vessel, and refuelling, with the orbiting space laboratory. It subsequently performed a second docking and refueling on June 15, 2017. After it coupled with Tiangong 2 for a period of 60 days, it decoupled and separated from the space laboratory and completed a three-month period of free flight at around 390 kilometres above the Earth, separately carrying out a range of science experiments. On September 12, 2017, Tianzhou 1 performed the third and final docking and refuel with Tiangong 2, with what is termed a fast docking which took 6.5 hours to complete. Previously the rendezvous and docking process took around two days, or 30 orbits.
