= Tianzhou 9 =

2025 Chinese resupply spaceflight

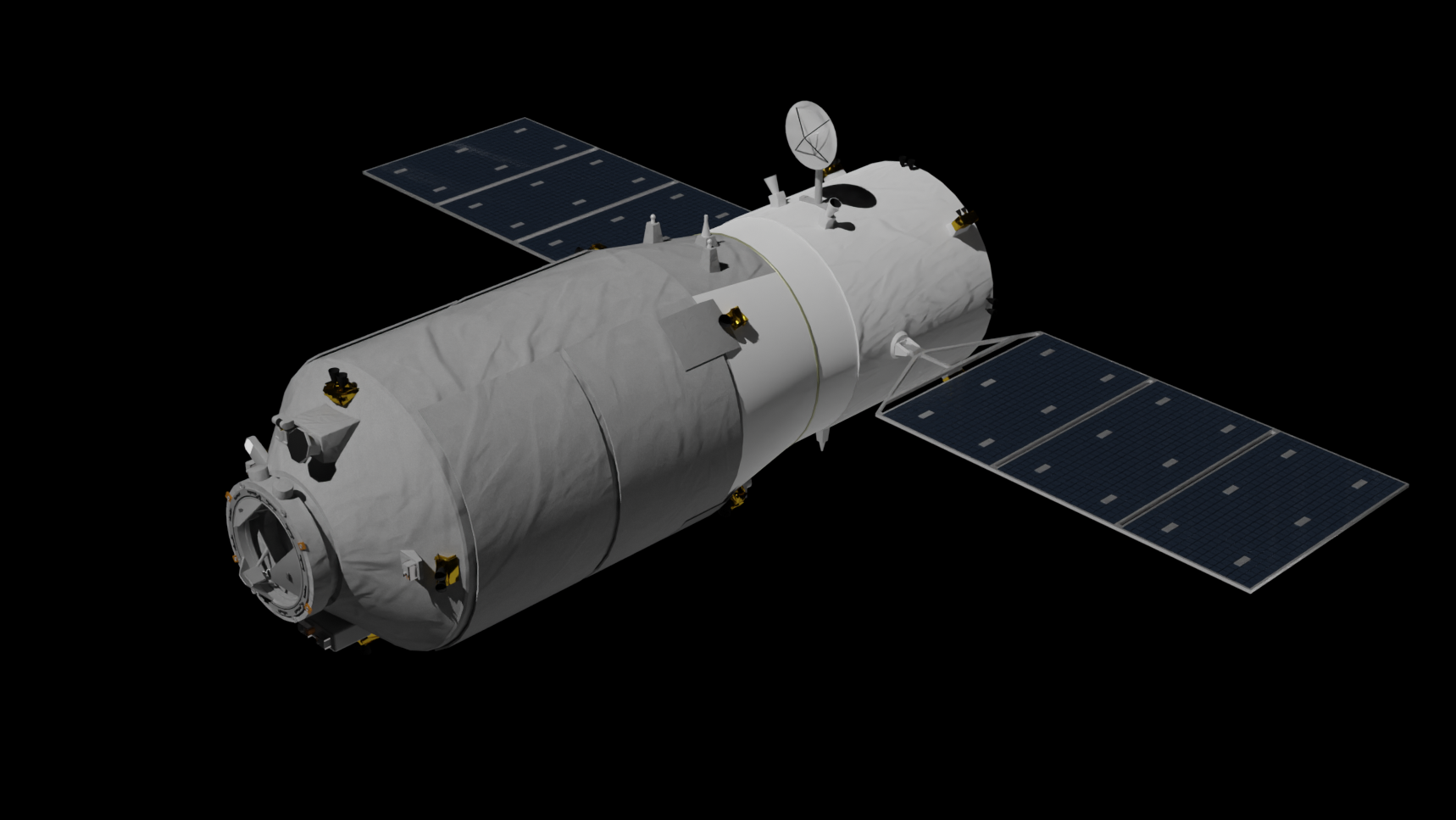
- A Tianzhou 3D rendering
- Mission type: Tiangong space station resupply
- Operator: China National Space Administration
- COSPAR ID: 2025-149A
- SATCAT no.: 64786
- Mission duration: 296 days, 2 hours and 15 minutes

Spacecraft properties
- Spacecraft: Tianzhou-9
- Spacecraft type: Tianzhou
- Manufacturer: China Aerospace Science and Technology Corporation
- Launch mass: 14,000 kg (31,000 lb)
- Payload mass: 7,400 kg (16,300 lb)
- Dimensions: 10.6 × 3.35 m (34.8 × 11.0 ft)

Start of mission
- Launch date: 14 July 2025, 21:34 UTC
- Rocket: Long March 7 (Y10)
- Launch site: Wenchang, LC-201
- Contractor: China Academy of Launch Vehicle Technology

End of mission
- Disposal: Deorbited
- Decay date: 6 May 2026, 23:49 UTC

Orbital parameters
- Reference system: Geocentric orbit
- Regime: Low Earth orbit
- Inclination: 41.5°

Docking with Tiangong
- Docking port: Tianhe aft
- Docking date: 15 July 2025, 00:52 UTC
- Undocking date: 6 May 2026, 08:34 UTC
- Time docked: 295 days, 7 hours and 42 minutes
- Mission patch Tianzhou program

Tianzhou 9 (Chinese: 天舟九号) was the ninth mission of a Tianzhou uncrewed cargo spacecraft and the eighth resupply mission to the Tiangong space station. Like previous Tianzhou missions, the spacecraft was launched from the Wenchang Satellite Launch Center in Hainan, China, aboard a Long March 7 rocket. The spacecraft carried nearly 6,500 kilograms (14,300 lb) of cargo to the space station.

== Mission history ==
Tianzhou 9 launched on 14 July 2025 at 21:34 UTC and docked with the Tiangong space station about three hours later, on 15 July 2025 at 00:52 UTC. The spacecraft delivered supplies for the Shenzhou 20 mission, which returned to Earth in November 2025.

Tianzhou 9 undocked from Tiangong on 6 May 2026 and re-entered the atmosphere later that day, disintegrating over the ocean.

== Payload ==
The spacecraft delivered nearly 6,500 kilograms (14,300 lb) of supplies, including propellant, more than 700 kilograms (1,500 lb) of scientific experiments, crew supplies, and two upgraded spacesuits.
