= Tianzhou 3 =

2021 Chinese resupply spaceflight to the Tiangong Space Station

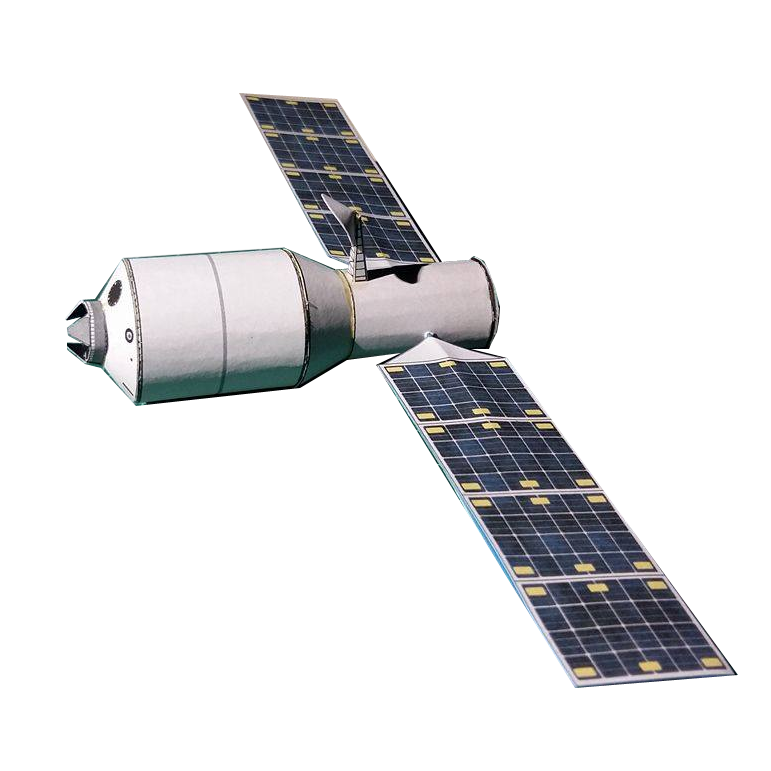
- A 1:144 scale paper model of a Tianzhou spacecraft
- Mission type: Tiangong space station resupply
- Operator: China National Space Administration
- COSPAR ID: 2021-085A
- SATCAT no.: 49222
- Mission duration: 309 days, 20 hours and 20 minutes

Spacecraft properties
- Spacecraft type: Tianzhou
- Manufacturer: China Aerospace Science and Technology Corporation
- Dry mass: 6,640 kg (14,640 lb)
- Dimensions: 10.6 × 3.35 m (34.8 × 11.0 ft)

Start of mission
- Launch date: 20 September 2021, 07:10:11 UTC (15:10:11 CST)
- Rocket: Long March 7 (Y4)
- Launch site: Wenchang, LC-201
- Contractor: China Academy of Launch Vehicle Technology

End of mission
- Disposal: Deorbited
- Destroyed: 27 July 2022, 03:31 UTC

Orbital parameters
- Reference system: Geocentric orbit
- Regime: Low Earth orbit
- Perigee altitude: 330 km (210 mi)
- Apogee altitude: 340 km (210 mi)
- Inclination: 41.4°

Docking with Tiangong space station
- Docking port: Tianhe aft
- Docking date: 20 September 2021, 14:08 UTC
- Undocking date: 19 April 2022, 21:02 UTC
- Time docked: 211 days, 6 hours and 54 minutes

Docking with Tiangong space station (relocation)
- Docking port: Tianhe forward
- Docking date: 20 April 2022, 01:06 UTC
- Undocking date: 17 July 2022, 02:59 UTC
- Time docked: 88 days, 1 hour and 53 minutes
- Mission insignia Tianzhou program

Tianzhou 3 (Chinese: 天舟三号) was a mission of the Tianzhou-class uncrewed cargo spacecraft, launched on 20 September 2021, at 07:10:11 UTC. Like previous Tianzhou missions, the spacecraft was launched from Wenchang Satellite Launch Center in Hainan, China on a Long March 7 launch vehicle.

Tianzhou 3 was the second cargo resupply mission to the Tianhe core module (TCM) of the under-construction Tiangong space station, carrying over six tons of supplies. The spacecraft successfully docked at the TCM's aft port seven hours after launch at 14:08 UTC.

On 20 April 2022, Tianzhou 3 successfully relocated itself from Tianhe's aft port to the forward port to make the aft port available for docking by Tianzhou 4. On 17 July it was undocked for deorbiting, making way for the installation of the Wentian module. It reentered the Earth's atmosphere and burned up as planned on 27 July 2022.

== Spacecraft ==
The Tianzhou cargo ship has several notable differences with the Tiangong stations from which it is derived. It has only three segments of solar panels (against 4 for Tiangong), but has 4 maneuvering engines (against 2).
