= Tianzhou 6 =

2023 Chinese resupply spaceflight

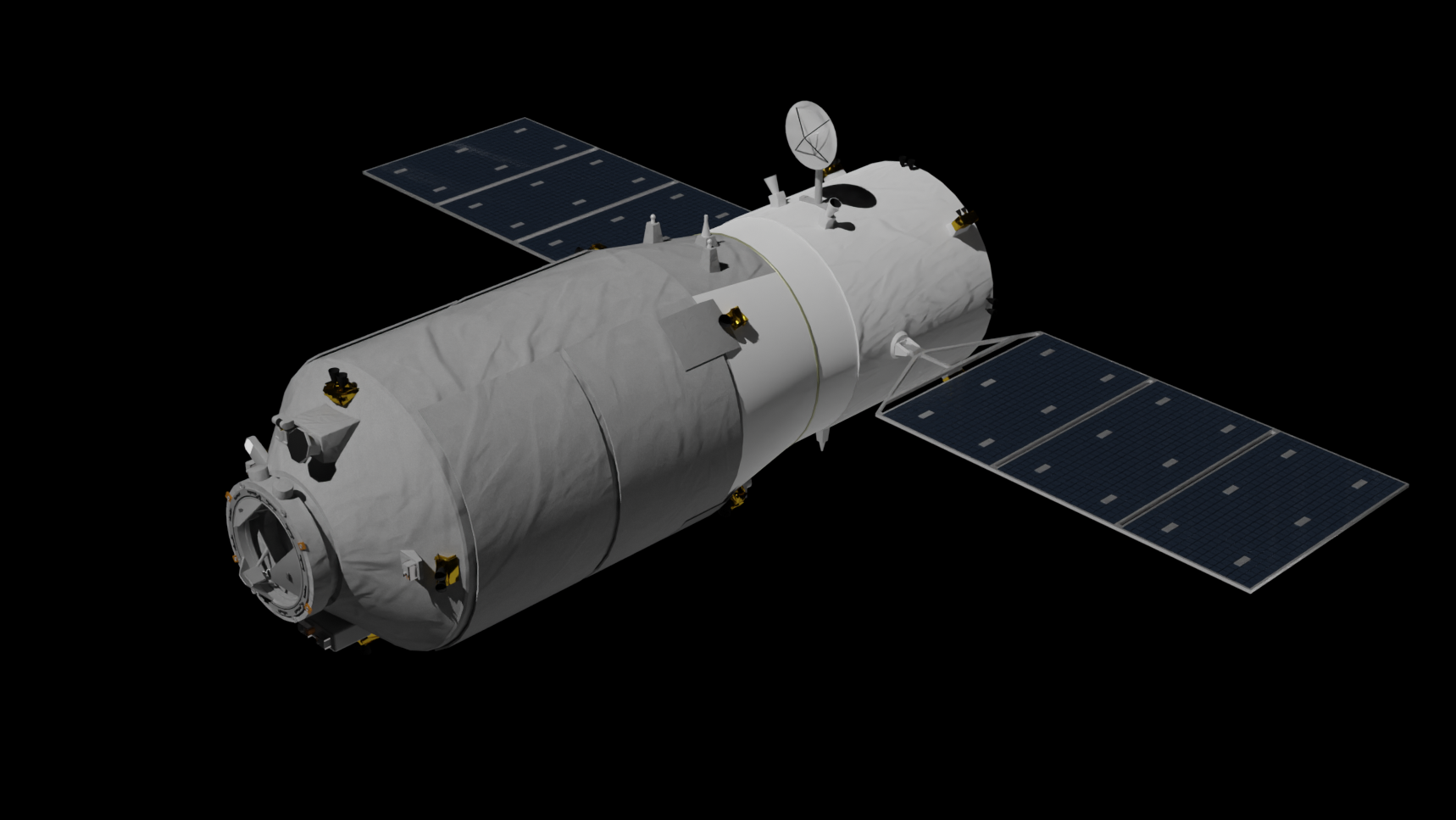
- A Tianzhou 3D model
- Mission type: Tiangong space station resupply
- Operator: China National Space Administration
- COSPAR ID: 2023-063A
- SATCAT no.: 56446
- Mission duration: 253 days, 23 hours and 15 minutes

Spacecraft properties
- Spacecraft type: Tianzhou
- Manufacturer: China Aerospace Science and Technology Corporation
- Launch mass: 14,000 kg (31,000 lb)
- Dry mass: 7,400 kg (16,300 lb)
- Dimensions: 10.6 × 3.35 m (34.8 × 11.0 ft)

Start of mission
- Launch date: 10 May 2023, 13:22:51 UTC (21:22:51 CST)
- Rocket: Long March 7 (Y7)
- Launch site: Wenchang, LC-201
- Contractor: China Academy of Launch Vehicle Technology

End of mission
- Disposal: Deorbited
- Destroyed: 19 January 2024, 12:37 UTC

Orbital parameters
- Reference system: Geocentric orbit
- Regime: Low Earth orbit
- Perigee altitude: 380 km (240 mi)
- Apogee altitude: 385 km (239 mi)
- Inclination: 41.46°

Docking with Tiangong space station
- Docking port: Tianhe aft
- Docking date: 10 May 2023, 21:16 UTC
- Undocking date: 12 January 2024, 08:02 UTC
- Time docked: 246 days, 10 hours and 46 minutes

Cargo
- Pressurised: 7,000 kg (15,000 lb)
- Fuel: 700 kg (1,500 lb)
- Mission insignia Tianzhou program

Tianzhou 6 (Chinese: 天舟六号) was the sixth mission of the Tianzhou-class uncrewed cargo spacecraft, and the fifth resupply mission to the Tiangong Space Station. Like previous Tianzhou missions, the spacecraft was launched from the Wenchang Satellite Launch Center in Hainan, China on a Long March 7 rocket. This was the first mission of the operation phase of Tiangong. It was launched on 10 May 2023 at 13:22 UTC, and docked to the Tiangong Space Station a few hours later.

== Mission history ==
On 12 March 2023, CMSA announced that Tianzhou 6 has completed manufacturing, and was delivered to Wenchang.

On 13 April 2023, Long March 7 Y7, the launch vehicle for this mission, arrived at Wenchang Space Launch Site. It started to conduct stacking and tests with the already arrived Tianzhou 6.

On 7 May 2023, Long March 7 Y7 and Tianzhou 6 arrived vertically at the launch pad.

On 10 May 2023 at 13:22:51.405 UTC, it was successfully launched from Wenchang. It docked to the aft port of the Tiangong Space Station less than 8 hours later.

Tianzhou 6 was undocked on 12 January 2024 to make way for Tianzhou 7 cargo ship, and deorbited by burning up in the Earth's atmosphere about a week later.

== Spacecraft ==
The cargo capacity of Tianzhou 6 has been increased by 20%, allowing to it carry payloads of up to 7.4 tonnes (16,000 lb), up from 6.9 tonnes (15,000 lb). The launch weight of the spacecraft was also increased from 13.5 to 14 tonnes (30,000 to 31,000 lb). Tianzhou 6 has the largest capacity in the Tianzhou series and is the largest active cargo supply spacecraft in terms of capacity.

Starting from this mission, the launch frequency of Tianzhou cargo spacecraft will be adjusted from two ships per year to three ships every two years.

== Cargo ==
Tianzhou-6 carried 1,750 kilograms (3,860 lb) of fuel, of which 700 kilograms (1,500 lb) is for resupplying the space station. It delivered more than 7,000 kilograms (15,000 lb) of pressurized cargo, including scientific payloads for researching about lidar and supercritical flow. It also brought 70 kilograms (150 lb) of fresh fruit for the Shenzhou 15 and 16 crew.
