= Tiangong-2 =

Chinese space station (2016–2019)

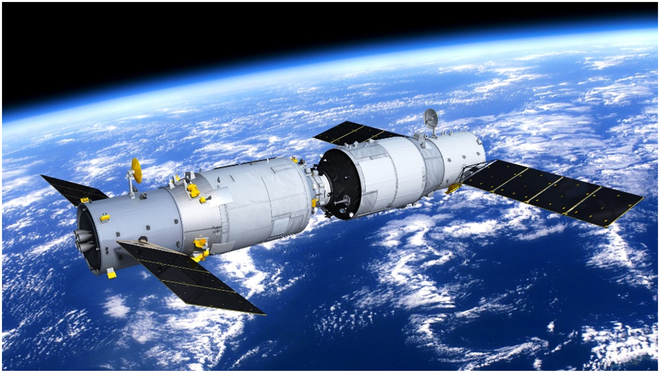
- A rendering of Tianzhou 1 (left) docked to Tiangong 2.

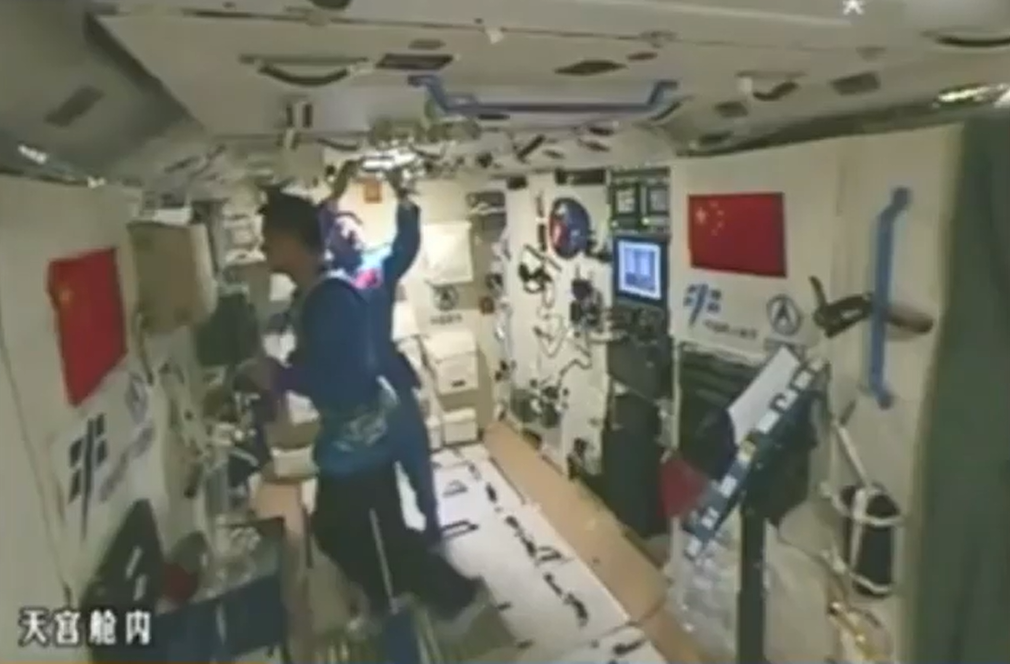
- Jing Haipeng and Chen Dong, the crew of Shenzhou 11, inside Tiangong-2

Station statistics
- COSPAR ID: 2016-057A
- SATCAT no.: 41765
- Crew: 2: 19 October – 17 November 2016 (Shenzhou 11)
- Launch: 15 September 2016, 14:04:12 UTC (22:04:12 CST)
- Carrier rocket: Long March 2F/T (T2)
- Launch pad: Jiuquan, LA-4/SLS-1
- Reentry: 19 July 2019
- Mission status: Complete; deorbited
- Mass: 8,670 kg (19,110 lb)
- Length: 10.4 m (34 ft)
- Width: 23 m (75 ft) solar panel span
- Diameter: 3.35 m (11.0 ft)
- Pressurised volume: 14.4 m^{3} (510 cu ft)
- Perigee altitude: 369.65 km (229.69 mi)
- Apogee altitude: 378.4 km (235.1 mi)
- Orbital inclination: 42.79°
- Orbital speed: 7.68 km/s (4.77 mi/s)
- Orbital period: 92 minutes
- Days occupied: 29
- Configuration
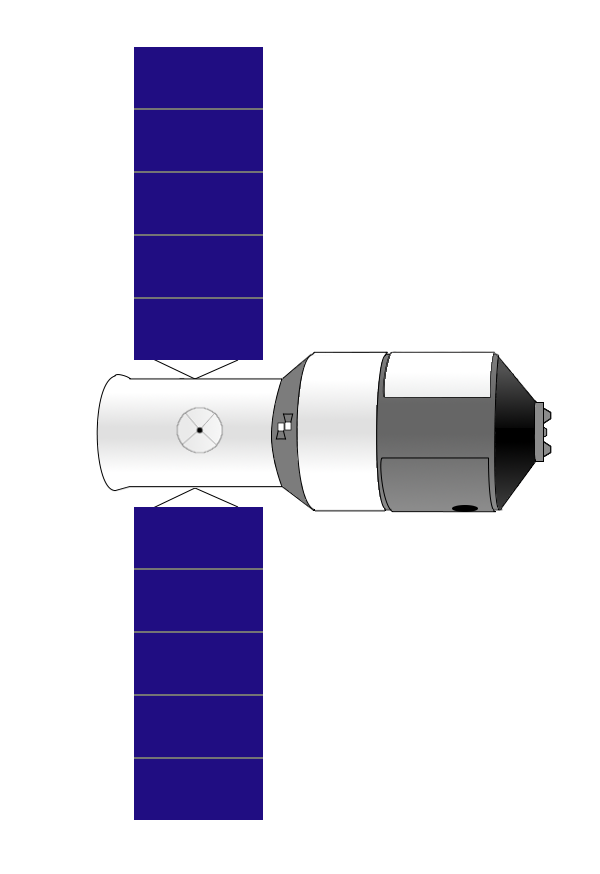
- Plan diagram of Tiangong 2 with solar panels extended

Tiangong-2
- Simplified Chinese: 天宫二号
- Traditional Chinese: 天宮二號
- Literal meaning: Celestial Palace-2 or Heavenly Palace-2
Transcriptions
Standard Mandarin
- Hanyu Pinyin: Tiāngōng Èrhào
- Gwoyeu Romatzyh: Tiangong ellhaw
- Wade–Giles: T'ien^{1}kung^{1} erh^{4}hao^{4}
- Yale Romanization: Tyāngūng èrhàu
Yue: Cantonese
- Yale Romanization: Tīngūng yihhouh
- Jyutping: Tin1 gung1 ji6 hou6

Space Laboratory
- Simplified Chinese: 空间实验室
- Traditional Chinese: 空間實驗室
- Literal meaning: Space Laboratory
Transcriptions
Standard Mandarin
- Hanyu Pinyin: Kōngjiān shíyàn shì
- Gwoyeu Romatzyh: kongjian shyryann shyh
- Wade–Giles: k'ung^{1}chien^{1} shih^{2}yen^{4} shih^{4}

Tiangong-2 (Chinese: 天宫二号; pinyin: Tiāngōng èrhào; lit. 'Heavenly Palace 2') was a Chinese space laboratory developed as part of the Project 921-2 space station program. It launched on 15 September 2016 and was deorbited on 19 July 2019.

Tiangong-2 was not intended to be a permanent orbital station, but rather a testbed for technologies later used on the modular Tiangong space station, whose first module launched in 2021. Although externally similar to Tiangong-1, Tiangong-2 included upgraded systems and additional capabilities, including a more advanced life-support system for longer crew stays and the ability to be refuelled by a Tianzhou cargo spacecraft. Compared to its predecessor, it also carried a more extensive set of scientific experiments, making it more of a true space laboratory than primarily a docking target vehicle. The station operated in an orbit similar to that later used by the Tiangong space station.

== Design ==
Tiangong-2 was developed as a technology demonstrator for systems later incorporated into the modular Tiangong space station, whose first module launched in 2021. Although externally similar to Tiangong-1, it incorporated upgraded systems, including improved life-support capabilities for longer-duration missions and support for in-orbit refuelling by a Tianzhou cargo spacecraft. It also carried a larger complement of scientific payloads than its predecessor and operated in an orbit similar to that later used by the modular Tiangong station.

The spacecraft retained the general configuration of Tiangong-1, having originally been constructed as a flight spare for that program. It had a total length of 10.4 metres (34 ft) and diameter of 3.35 metres (11.0 ft), and a launch mass of approximately 8.6 tonnes (19,000 lb). Two deployable solar arrays mounted on the service module provided electrical power for onboard systems and experiments.

The forward 5-metre-long (16 ft) experiment compartment served as the crew's primary living and working area, containing flight control and communications equipment, workstations for scientific experiments, sleeping quarters, and observation windows. The transition section tapered from the experiment compartment's 3.35-metre (11.0 ft) diameter to the 2.25-metre (7 ft 5 in) diameter of the service module and housed oxygen, nitrogen, and water tanks for the life-support system.

Tiangong-2 used an androgynous docking system developed by the Shanghai Academy of Spaceflight Technology for docking with Shenzhou crewed spacecraft and Tianzhou cargo spacecraft. The system incorporated radar, laser ranging, optical tracking, and radio guidance equipment to support automated and manual rendezvous operations. Compared with Tiangong-1, the interface was modified to enable in-orbit propellant transfer.

The aft 3.3-metre-long (11 ft) service module housed propulsion, electrical, communications, and attitude-control systems. Electrical power was supplied by two four-panel solar arrays spanning approximately 23 metres (75 ft), supported by onboard batteries. The spacecraft also carried a 10-metre (33 ft) robotic arm developed by the China Academy of Space Technology for testing technologies later used on the modular Tiangong station.

A companion microsatellite, Banxing 2, was launched with Tiangong-2 and later deployed for technology demonstrations and external imaging of the laboratory.

The laboratory carried 14 scientific payloads, including experiments in quantum communications, materials science, plant growth, remote sensing, gamma-ray astronomy, and atomic clock technology.

== History ==
The China Manned Space Engineering Office published a brief description of Tiangong-2 and its successor Tiangong-3 in 2008, stating that at least two crewed spacecraft would dock with Tiangong-2.

Tiangong-2 was originally planned for launch by the China National Space Agency (CNSA) in 2015 as the successor to Tiangong-1, which launched in September 2011. Chinese officials stated in March 2011 that the module would support crewed missions and uncrewed cargo resupply operations.

In September 2014, the launch was delayed to September 2016. At the same time, plans were announced for visits by the crewed Shenzhou 11 mission and the cargo spacecraft Tianzhou.

Tiangong-2 launched from Jiuquan aboard a Long March 2F/T rocket on 15 September 2016. Shenzhou 11 docked with the laboratory on 19 October 2016. The mission carried commander Jing Haipeng and Chen Dong, marking China's first crewed spaceflight in more than three years.

During the 30-day mission, the crew conducted experiments related to the physiological effects of weightlessness, in-orbit maintenance operations, materials science, and other spacecraft systems. Additional experiments involved a gamma-ray burst polarimeter and a space-based cold atomic clock. The crew also deployed a companion satellite and carried out close-range observation and photography activities. Shenzhou 11 departed Tiangong-2 on 17 November 2016, and its reentry module landed in central Inner Mongolia Autonomous Region later that day.

On 22 April 2017, Tianzhou-1 docked with Tiangong-2 and completed China's first in-orbit propellant transfer. The spacecraft later carried out additional docking and refuelling tests on 15 June and 12 September 2017. The final test used a fast rendezvous profile that reduced docking time to approximately 6 1/2 hours.

In July 2019, the China Manned Space Engineering Office announced plans to deorbit Tiangong-2. The laboratory made a controlled reentry on 19 July 2019 and burned up over the South Pacific Ocean.

== See also ==
- Chinese space program
- Tiangong space station – a successive multi-module orbital station
- Shenzhou program
- International Space Station
- List of space stations
- Salyut programme – a similar Soviet space station programme
