= Tianzhou 7 =

2024 Chinese resupply spaceflight

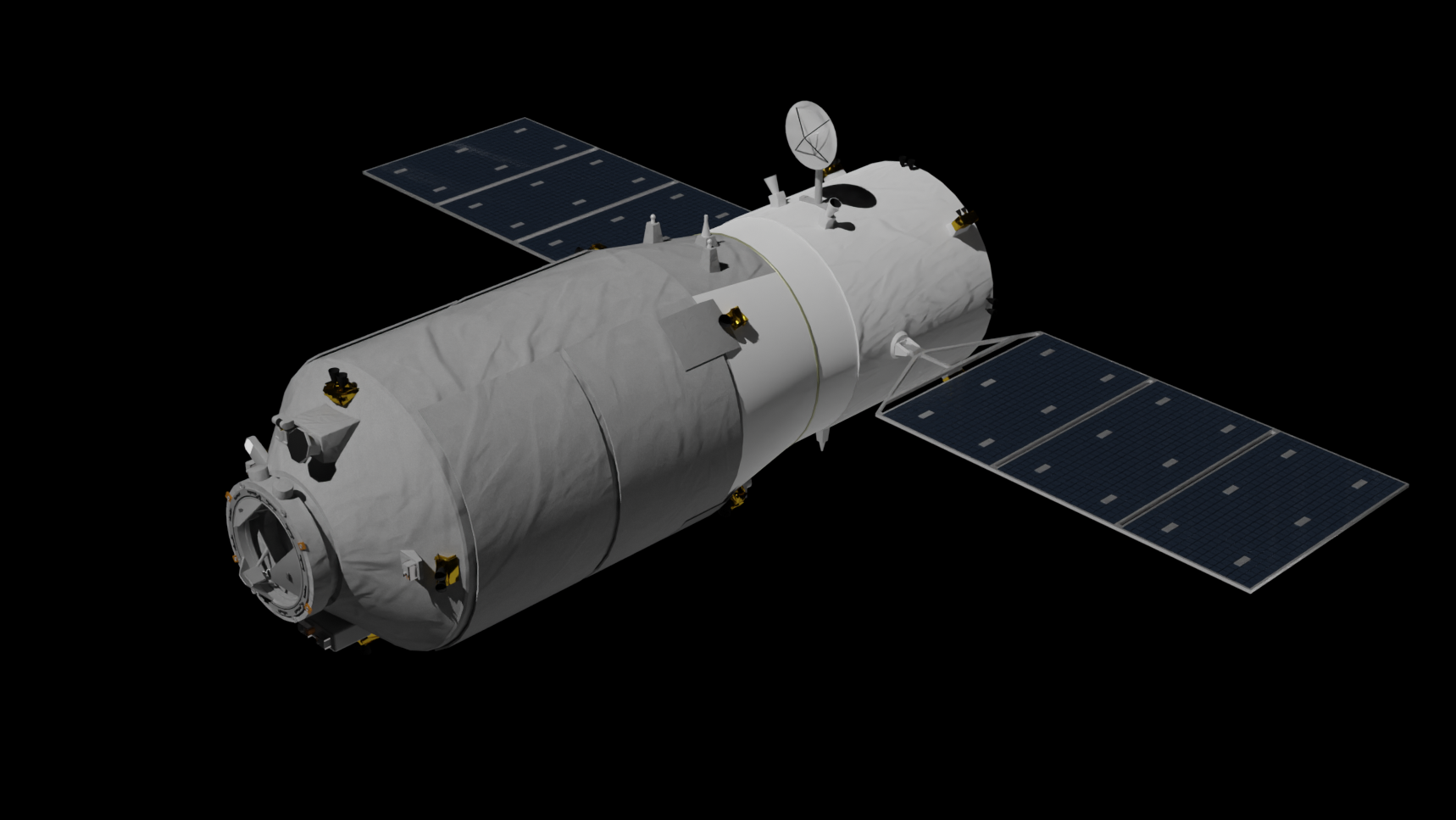
- A Tianzhou 3D model
- Mission type: Tiangong space station resupply
- Operator: CNSA
- COSPAR ID: 2024-013A
- SATCAT no.: 58811
- Mission duration: 304 days, 22 hours, 58 minutes

Spacecraft properties
- Spacecraft: Tianzhou-7
- Spacecraft type: Tianzhou
- Manufacturer: China Aerospace Science and Technology Corporation
- Launch mass: 14,000 kg (31,000 lb)
- Payload mass: 7,400 kg (16,300 lb)
- Dimensions: 10.6 m × 3.35 m (34.8 ft × 11.0 ft)

Expedition
- Space station: Tiangong space station

Start of mission
- Launch date: 17 January 2024, 14:27 UTC
- Rocket: Long March 7 (Y8)
- Launch site: Wenchang, LC-201
- Contractor: China Academy of Launch Vehicle Technology

End of mission
- Disposal: Deorbited
- Decay date: 17 November 2024, 13:25 UTC

Orbital parameters
- Reference system: Geocentric orbit
- Regime: Low Earth orbit
- Inclination: 41.5°

Docking with Tiangong space station
- Docking port: Tianhe aft
- Docking date: 17 January 2024, 17:46 UTC
- Undocking date: 10 November 2024, 08:30 UTC
- Time docked: 297 days, 14 hours, 44 minutes
- Tianzhou 7 mission patch Tianzhou program

Tianzhou 7 (Chinese: 天舟七号) was the seventh mission of the Tianzhou-class uncrewed cargo spacecraft, and the sixth resupply mission to the Tiangong Space Station. Like previous Tianzhou missions, the spacecraft was launched from the Wenchang Satellite Launch Center in Hainan, China, on a Long March 7 rocket.

== Mission history ==
On 20 November 2023, CMSA announced that Tianzhou 7 had completed manufacturing, and was delivered to Wenchang.

On 21 December 2023, Long March 7 Y8, the launch vehicle for this mission, arrived at the Wenchang Space Launch Site. It started to conduct stacking and tests with the already arrived Tianzhou 7.

On 17 January 2024 at 14:27 UTC, Long March 7 Y8 successfully lifted off from Wenchang SLS's LC-201, propelling Tianzhou 7 towards the Tiangong Station. The spacecraft docked successfully with Tiangong some three hours later at 17:46 UTC.

Tianzhou 7 undocked from Tiangong on 10 November 2024 at 08:30 UTC. While in free flight, the ship ejected a 6U CubeSat. It was deorbited over the Pacific Ocean on 17 November, beginning to burn up as it reentered the atmosphere at 13:25 UTC near Vanuatu.
