= Tianzhou (spacecraft) =

Chinese automated cargo spacecraft

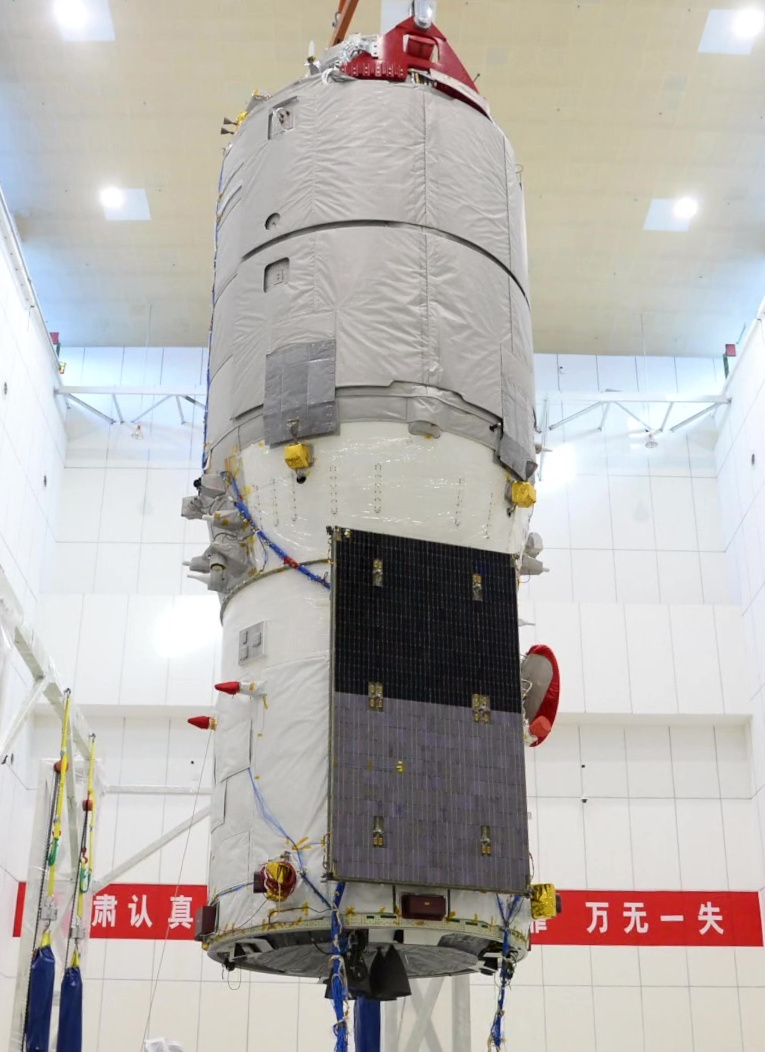
- Tianzhou 2 cargo spacecraft prior to launch
- Manufacturer: China Aerospace Science and Technology Corporation
- Country of origin: China
- Operator: China Manned Space Agency
- Applications: Tiangong space station resupply

Specifications
- Spacecraft type: Automated cargo spacecraft
- Launch mass: Original: 13,500 kg (29,800 lb); Improved: 14,000 kg (31,000 lb)
- Payload capacity: Original: 6,900 kg (15,200 lb); Improved: 7,400 kg (16,300 lb)
- Volume: 40 m^{3} (1,400 ft^{3})

Dimensions
- Length: 10.6 m (35 ft)
- Diameter: 3.35 m (11.0 ft)
- Solar array span: 14.9 m (49 ft)

Production
- Status: Active
- Built: 10
- Launched: 10
- Operational: 1
- Maiden launch: Tianzhou 1
- Last launch: Tianzhou 10

Related spacecraft
- Derived from: Tiangong-1
- Powered by: 4 × 490 N main engines, 32 attitude control engines (25, 120, 150 N thrust)

The Tianzhou (Chinese: 天舟; pinyin: Tiān Zhōu; lit. 'Heavenly Ship') is a series of Chinese automated cargo spacecraft developed from China's first prototype space station Tiangong-1 to resupply its modular space station. It was first launched (Tianzhou 1) on the Long March 7 rocket from Wenchang on April 20, 2017 and demonstrated autonomous propellant transfer (space refueling). Tianzhou also removes waste from the Tiangong via its destructive atmospheric reentry.

== Design ==
The Tianzhou cargo spacecraft has several notable differences with the Tiangong-1 from which it is derived. It has only three segments of solar panels (against 4 for Tiangong), but has 4 maneuvering engines (against 2 for Tiangong).

The original version of Tianzhou (flown for missions 1 thru 5) had a mass of 13,500 kg and could carry 6,900 kg of cargo. Tianzhou 6 was the first improved version of the spacecraft to be launched into orbit; it has a mass of about 14,000 kg and can transport 7,400 kg of cargo.

== Function ==
Based on the Tiangong-1 space station, the Tianzhou functions as the main automated cargo spacecraft for the Tiangong space station. It has pressurized, semi-pressurized and unpressurized cargo capabilities, and is able to transport airtight cargo, large extravehicular payloads and experiment platforms. It was first launched on the new Long March 7 rocket from Wenchang on April 20, 2017.

== Name ==
The China Manned Space Engineering Office opened a consultation for the naming of the prospective cargo ship on April 25, 2011. By May 20, it had received more than 50,000 suggestions. On July 8, Yang Liwei, China's first astronaut and deputy director of the Chinese Academy of Sciences revealed that they had a short list of ten names. On October 31, 2013, it was revealed that the spacecraft had been named Tianzhou (Chinese: 天舟; pinyin: Tiān Zhōu; lit. 'Heavenly Boat'), combining the Chinese names of the Tiangong (Chinese: 天宫; pinyin: Tiān Gōng) space stations and the Shenzhou (Chinese: 神舟; pinyin: Shén Zhōu) spacecraft. They also stated that they would use the two letter identification TZ.

== Missions ==
Tianzhou spacecraft were initially flown to the Tiangong space station every 6 months. From Tianzhou 6 onward, missions have been flown with the new version of Tianzhou with increased cargo capacity, allowing the launch frequency to be reduced to three ships every two years.

Mission	Launch (UTC)	Carrier Rocket	Launch Pad	Docking (UTC)			Deorbit (UTC)	Remarks	Ref
Mission	Launch (UTC)	Carrier Rocket	Launch Pad	Port	Docking	Undocking	Deorbit (UTC)	Remarks	Ref
Tianzhou 1	20 April 2017, 11:41	Long March 7	Wenchang, LC‑201	Tiangong-2 forward	21 April 2017, 04:16	22 September 2017, 08:15	22 September 2017, 10:00	Maiden flight of the Tianzhou spacecraft. Only Tianzhou flight to Tiangong-2.	
Tianzhou 2	29 May 2021, 12:55	Long March 7	Wenchang, LC‑201	Tianhe aft (Note: Initially docked to aft port, moved to forward port on 18 Sep 2021, and then again to portside port on 6 Jan 2022)	29 May 2021, 21:01	27 March 2022, 07:59	31 March 2022, 10:40	First Tianzhou flight to the Tiangong space station.	
Tianzhou 3	20 September 2021, 07:10	Long March 7	Wenchang, LC‑201	Tianhe aft (Note: Initially docked to aft port, moved to forward port on 20 Apr 2022)	20 September 2021, 14:08	17 July 2022, 02:59	27 July 2022, 03:31		
Tianzhou 4	9 May 2022, 17:56	Long March 7	Wenchang, LC‑201	Tianhe aft	10 May 2022, 00:54	9 November 2022, 06:55	14 November 2022, 23:21		
Tianzhou 5	12 November 2022, 02:03	Long March 7	Wenchang, LC‑201	Tianhe aft	12 November 2022, 04:10	11 September 2023, 08:46	12 September 2023, 02:13		
Tianzhou 6	10 May 2023, 13:22	Long March 7	Wenchang, LC‑201	Tianhe aft	10 May 2023, 21:16	12 January 2024, 08:02	19 January 2024, 12:37		
Tianzhou 7	17 January 2024, 14:27	Long March 7	Wenchang, LC‑201	Tianhe aft	17 January 2024, 17:46	10 November 2024, 08:30	17 November 2024, 13:25		
Tianzhou 8	15 November 2024, 15:13	Long March 7	Wenchang, LC‑201	Tianhe aft	15 November 2024, 18:32	8 July 2025, 07:09	8 July 2025, 22:46		
Tianzhou 9	14 July 2025, 21:34	Long March 7	Wenchang, LC‑201	Tianhe aft	15 July 2025, 0:52	6 May 2026, 08:34	6 May 2026, 23:49		
Tianzhou 10	11 May 2026, 00:14	Long March 7	Wenchang, LC‑201	Tianhe aft	11 May 2026, 05:11	TBA	TBA		

== See also ==
- Comparison of space station cargo vehicles
  - Progress spacecraft – an expendable cargo vehicle currently in use by the Russian Federal Space Agency
  - Automated Transfer Vehicle – a retired expendable cargo vehicle used by the ESA
  - Cygnus spacecraft – an expendable cargo vehicle developed by Northrop Grumman under American CRS program, currently in use.
  - H-II Transfer Vehicle – an expendable cargo vehicle currently in use by JAXA
  - Dream Chaser Cargo System - a cargo variant of the reusable SNC's spaceplane with Shooting Star module.
  - Dragon cargo spacecraft - a reusable cargo vehicle developed by SpaceX, under American CRS program, currently in use.
