= China Academy of Launch Vehicle Technology =

Chinese aerospace company

- Trade name: CALT
- Native name: 中国运载火箭技术研究院
- Type: Subsidiary
- Industry: Aerospace
- Founded: November 16, 1957; 68 years ago
- Headquarters: Beijing, China
- Key people: Wang Xiaojun (President and Deputy Party Secretary); Li Minghua (Party Secretary and Vice President)
- Products: Long March launch vehicles; Yuanzheng upper stages; Feitian space suit
- Total assets: ▲CN¥103.795 billion (2020)
- Number of employees: 33,000 (May 2020)
- Parent: CASC
- Website: www.calt.com

China Academy of Launch Vehicle Technology
- Simplified Chinese: 中国运载火箭技术研究院
- Traditional Chinese: 中國運載火箭技術研究院
Transcriptions
Standard Mandarin
- Hanyu Pinyin: Zhōngguó Yùnzài Huǒjiàn Jìshù Yánjiūyuàn

CALT
- Chinese: 火箭院
Transcriptions
Standard Mandarin
- Hanyu Pinyin: Huǒjiàn Yuàn

The China Academy of Launch Vehicle Technology (CALT) is a research institute affiliated with the China Aerospace Science and Technology Corporation (CASC). Established in 1957 by Qian Xuesen, it is headquartered in Fengtai, Beijing, China.

Its major contribution to China's civilian and military launch capability has been the manufacture of the Long March family of rockets. CALT has over 33,000 employees. The current Chief Designer is Long Lehao (龙乐豪).

CALT is also planning two spaceplanes. They would both be single-stage to space sub-orbital rocketplanes. One would be a 10-ton 4-passenger plane that would fly to 100 km at Mach 6. The other would be a 100-ton 20-passenger plane that would fly to 130 km at Mach 8. They would be equipped with liquid methane/liquid oxygen rocket engines. The larger spaceplane would also be able to carry a strap-on space rocket, making it function as the first stage of a two-stage to orbit space launch platform. That rocket would launch above the Karman line, and lift 1–2 tons to LEO.

In 2021, following tests by CALT, United States Secretary of the Air Force Frank Kendall III stated that China was developing and testing a fractional orbital bombardment system.

== U.S. sanctions ==
In August 2020, the United States Department of Defense released the names of "Communist Chinese military companies" operating directly or indirectly in the United States. CALT was included on the list.

In November 2020, U.S. President Donald Trump issued an executive order prohibiting U.S. companies and individuals owning shares in companies, including CALT, that the U.S. Department of Defense has listed as having links to the People's Liberation Army.

== Subsidiaries ==
- China Energine
- China Rocket, which developed Jielong 1
