= List of spacewalks 2015–2024 =

This list contains all spacewalks performed between 2015–2024 where an astronaut has fully or partially left the spacecraft.

As of 19 August 2016, 215 astronauts have made spacewalks (out of 549 people who have gone into Earth orbit).

Since 1981, NASA has measured spacewalk duration from when the suits went to internal power until the start of airlock re-pressurization. Roscosmos and China have always used the time from hatch opening to hatch closure. These charts typically follow the agency's measurements of spacewalk duration, because those figures tend to be the most readily available, as they are most often provided by the agency.

== 2015–2019 spacewalks ==
Spacewalk beginning and ending times are given in Coordinated Universal Time (UTC).

=== 2015 spacewalks ===
#	Start date/time	Duration	End time	Spacecraft	Crew	Remarks
374	21 February; 12:45	6 hours, 41 minutes	19:26	Expedition 42; ISS Quest	(United States) Barry E. Wilmore; (United States) Terry W. Virts	Rigged and routed power and data cables at the forward end of the Harmony module as part of preparations for the installation of the International Docking Adapter at PMA-2.
375	25 February; 11:51	6 hours, 43 minutes	18:34	Expedition 42; ISS Quest	(United States) Barry E. Wilmore; (United States) Terry W. Virts	Completed power and data cable routing at the forward end of the Harmony module. Removed launch locks from forward and aft berthing ports of Tranquility to prepare for relocation of the Permanent Multipurpose Module and the installation of the Bigelow Expandable Activity Module. Lubricated end effector of Canadarm2.
376	1 March; 11:52	5 hours, 38 minutes	17:30	Expedition 42; ISS Quest	(United States) Barry E. Wilmore; (United States) Terry W. Virts	Finished cable routing, antenna and retro-reflector installation on both sides of the ISS truss and on other modules in preparation for the installation of the International Docking Adapter at PMA-2 and 3.
377	10 August; 14:20	5 hours, 31 minutes	19:51	Expedition 44; ISS Pirs	(Russia) Gennady Padalka; (Russia) Mikhail Korniyenko	Installed gap spanners on the hull of the station for facilitating movement of crew members on future spacewalks, cleaned windows of the Zvezda Service Module, installed fasteners on communications antennas, replaced an aging docking antenna, photographed various locations and hardware on Zvezda and nearby modules, and retrieved a space environment experiment.
378	28 October; 12:03	7 hours, 16 minutes	19:19	Expedition 45; ISS Quest	(United States) Scott Kelly; (United States) Kjell N. Lindgren	Prepared a Main Bus Switching Unit for repair, installed a thermal cover on the Alpha Magnetic Spectrometer, lubricated elements of the Space Station Remote Manipulator System, and routed data and power cables to prepare for the installation of the International Docking Adaptor at PMA-2 and 3.
379	6 November; 11:22	7 hours, 48 minutes	19:10	Expedition 45; ISS Quest	(United States) Scott Kelly; (United States) Kjell N. Lindgren	Worked to restore a portion of the ISS's cooling system to its primary configuration, returning ammonia coolant levels to normal in the primary and backup radiator arrays.
380	21 December; 13:45	3 hours, 16 minutes	16:01	Expedition 46; ISS Quest	(United States) Scott Kelly; (United States) Timothy Kopra	Released a brake on the Mobile Servicing System to allow it to be properly stowed prior to the arrival of a visiting Progress vehicle. Routed cables in preparation for the installation of the Nauka module and the International Docking Adapter, and retrieved tools from a toolbox.

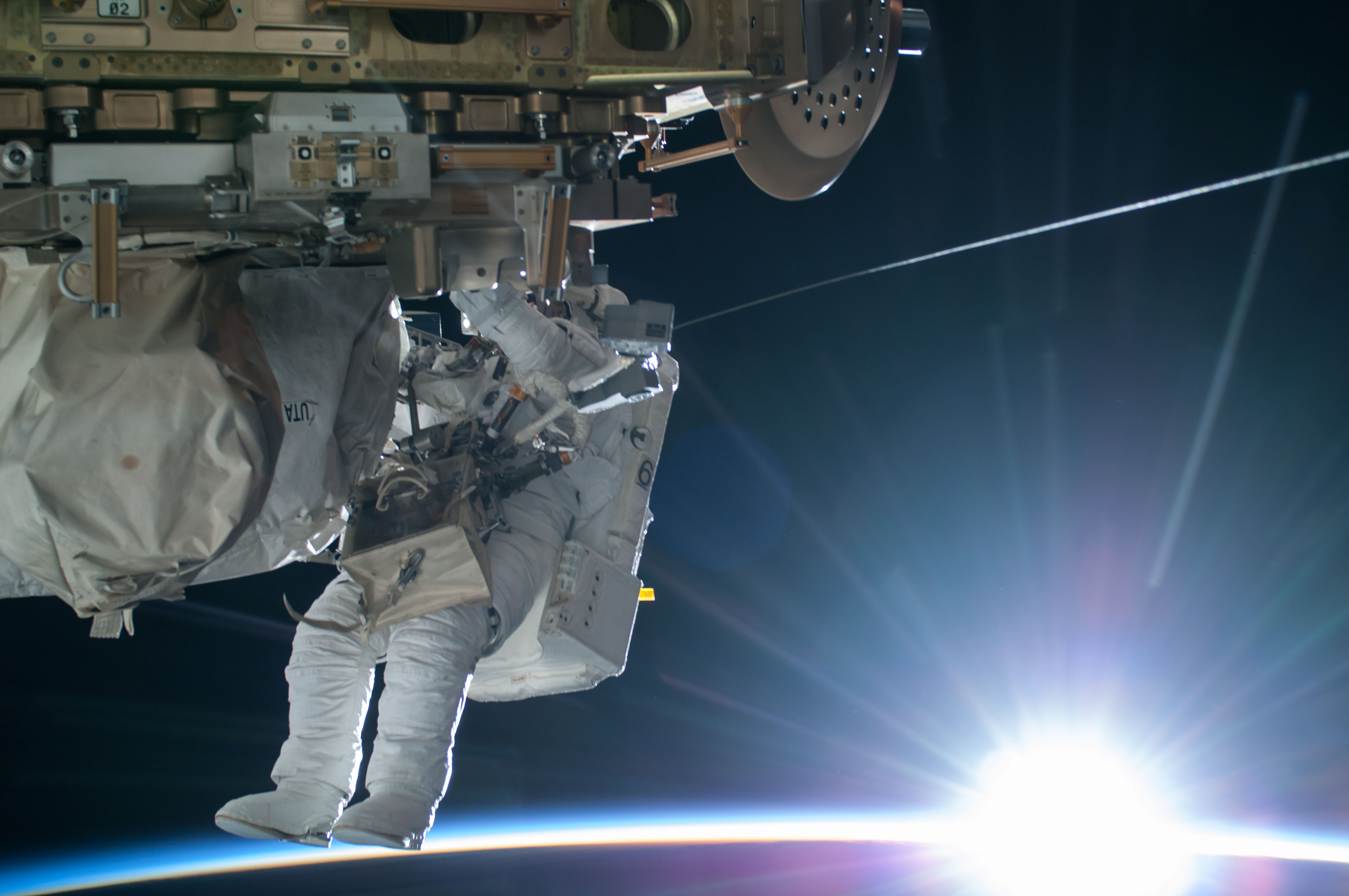
Terry Virts

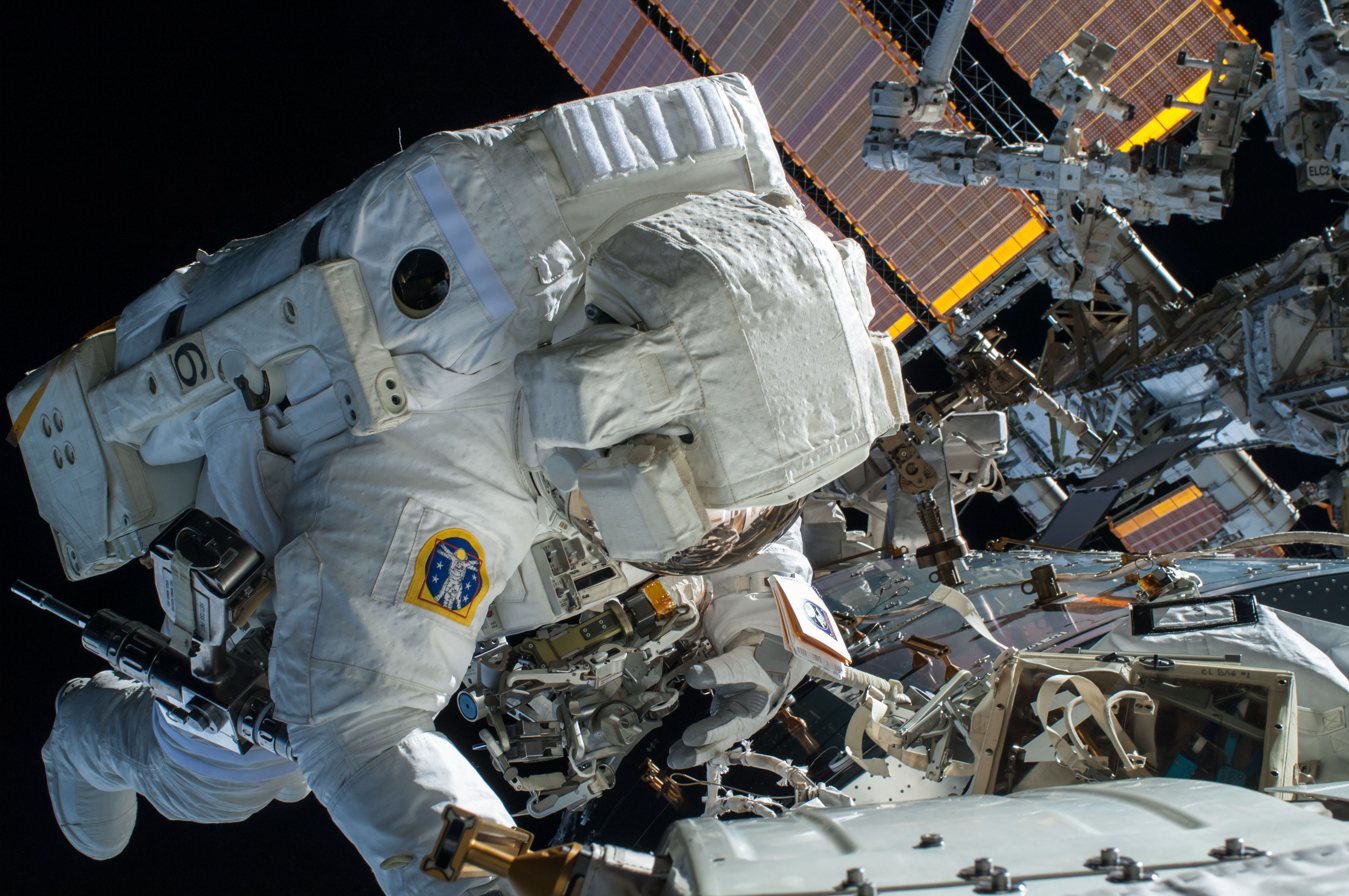
Terry Virts

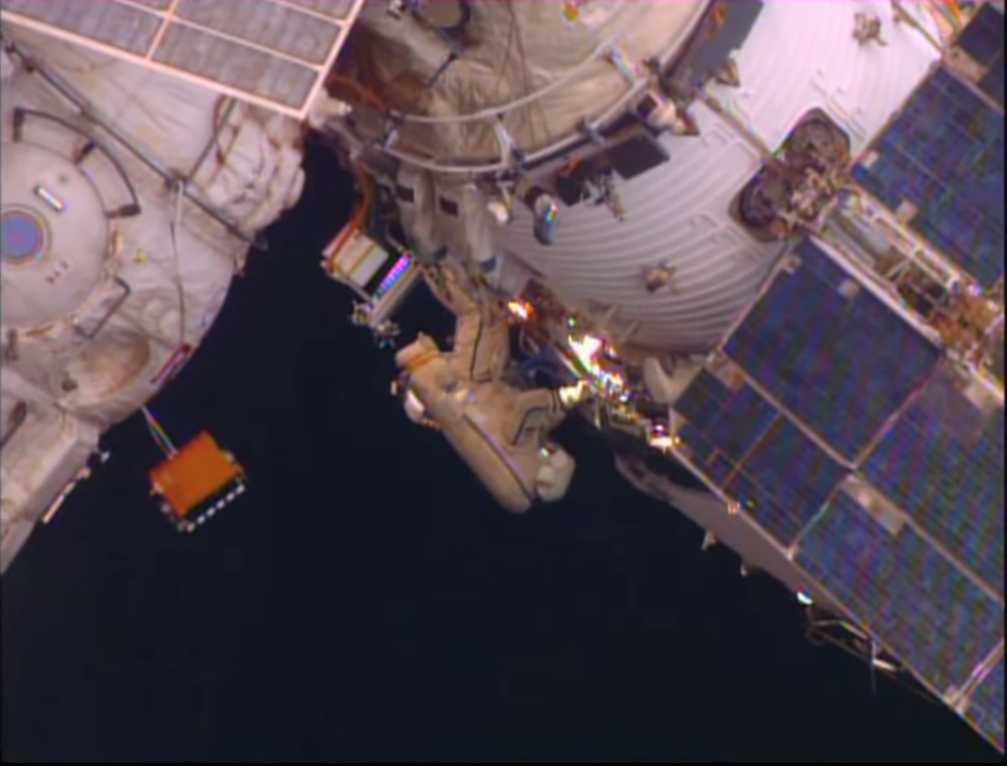

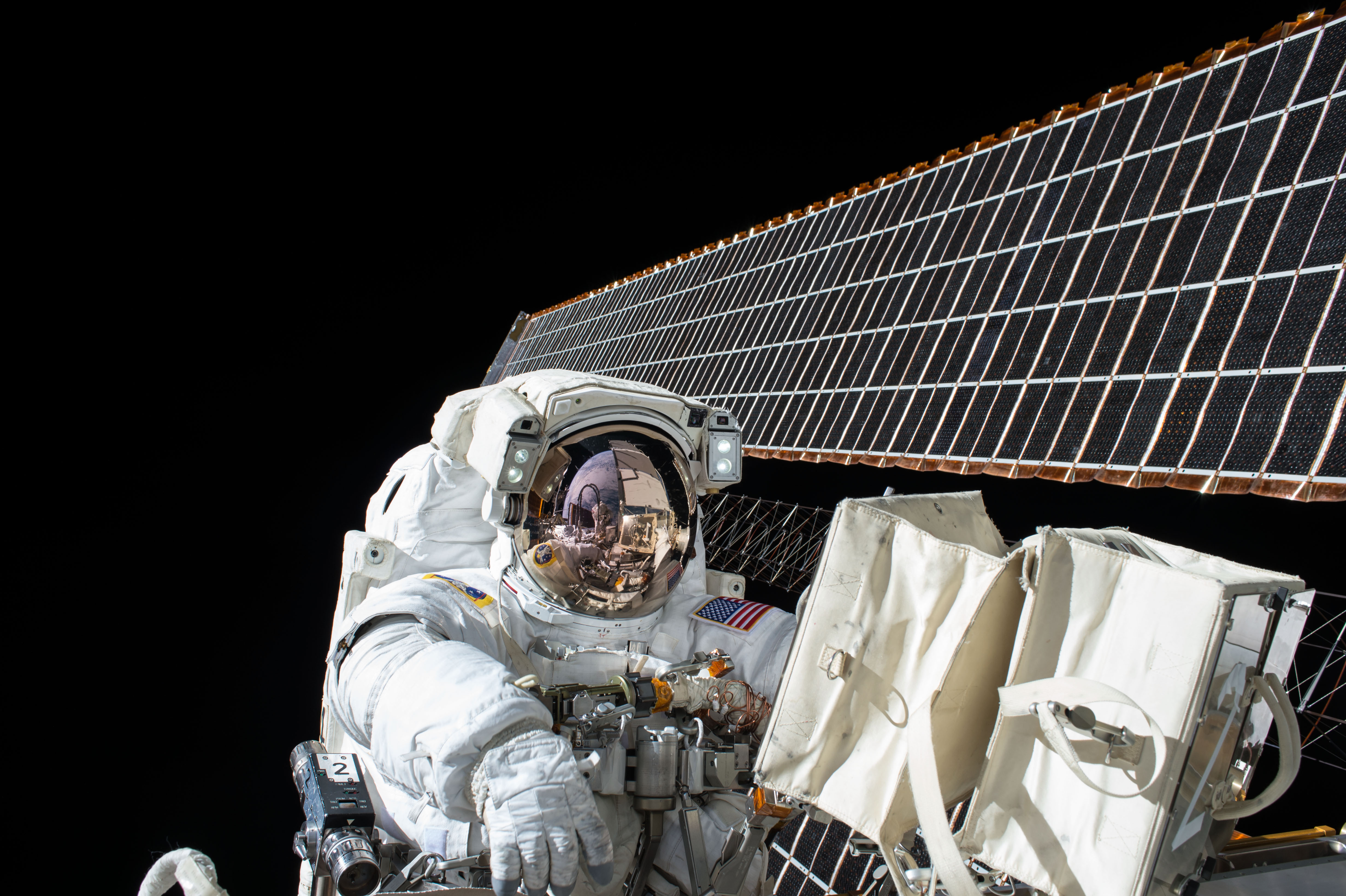
Scott Kelly

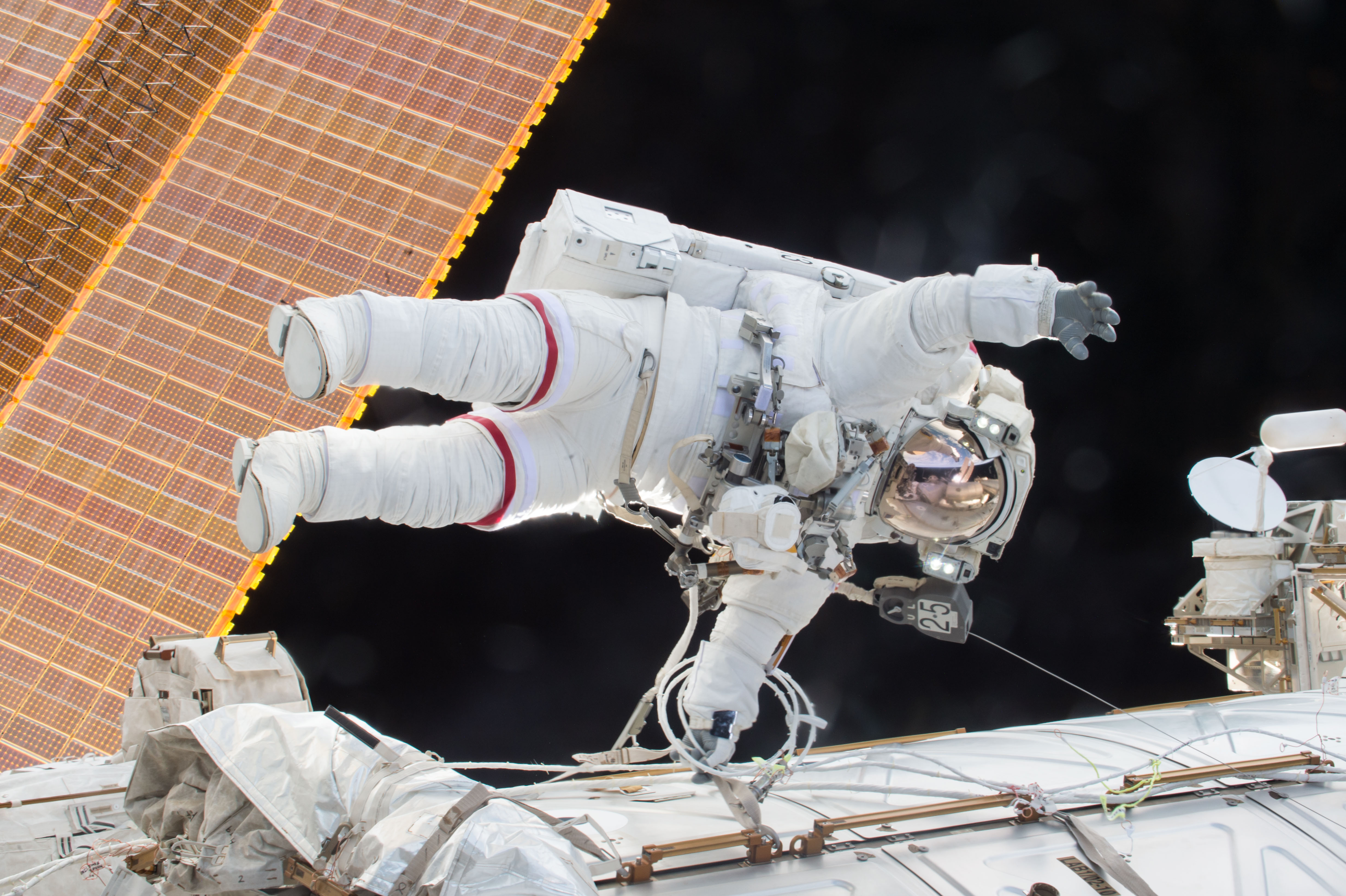
Scott Kelly

=== 2016 spacewalks ===
#	Start date/time	Duration	End time	Spacecraft	Crew	Remarks
381	15 January; 13:48	4 hours, 43 minutes	18:31	Expedition 46; ISS Quest	(United States) Timothy Kopra; (United Kingdom) Tim Peake	Replaced a failed voltage regulator responsible for shutting down one of the station's eight power channels in November 2015, and routed cables in support of the installation of the International Docking Adaptor. EVA terminated two hours, early due to water leakage in Kopra's helmet, but the primary task was accomplished.
382	3 February; 12:55	4 hours, 45 minutes	17:40	Expedition 46; ISS Pirs	(Russia) Yuri Malenchenko; (Russia) Sergey Volkov	Deployed a commemorative flash drive, took samples of module exteriors, installed handrails for use in future EVAs, retrieved an astrobiology experiment, deployed a materials science experiment, and tested a tool for applying coatings to module exteriors.
383	19 August; 12:04	5 hours, 58 minutes	18:02	Expedition 48; ISS Quest	(United States) Jeff Williams; (United States) Kate Rubins	The astronauts installed the International Docking Adapter (IDA) which was delivered by Dragon CRS-9, allowing future commercial crew spacecraft to dock with the station. This first IDA was attached to Harmony's forward port, over the existing Pressurized Mating Adapter (PMA). The EVA terminated after completing the primary objective, without completing the secondary objectives, due to a malfunction of the right earphone of Jeff Williams.
384	1 September; 11:53	6 hours, 48 minutes	18:41	Expedition 48; ISS Quest	(United States) Jeff Williams; (United States) Kate Rubins	The crew retracted a thermal radiator which is a backup, and then installed the first pair of several high definition cameras to monitor the traffic around the station. Then they performed some maintenance operations.

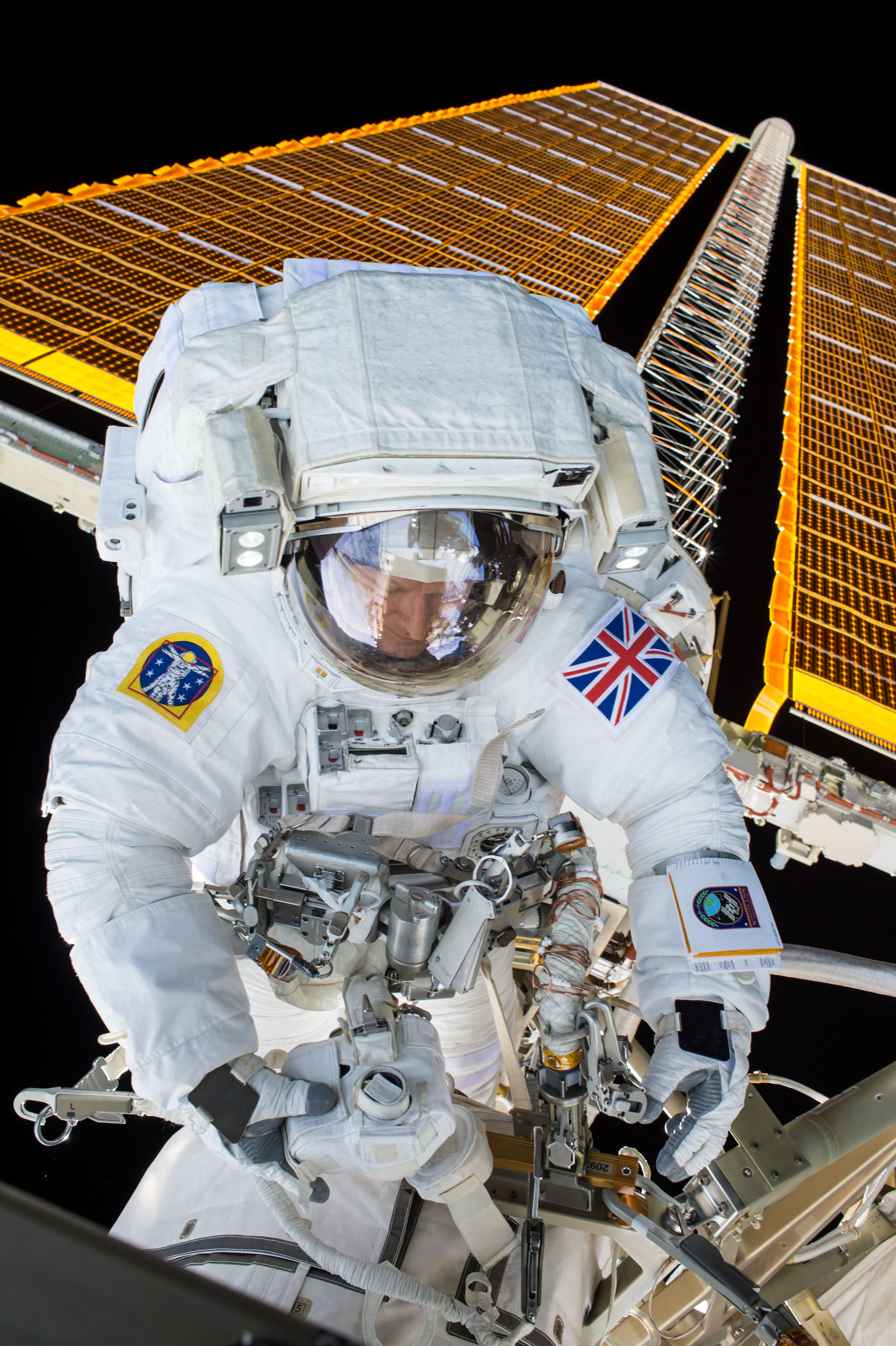
Timothy Peake

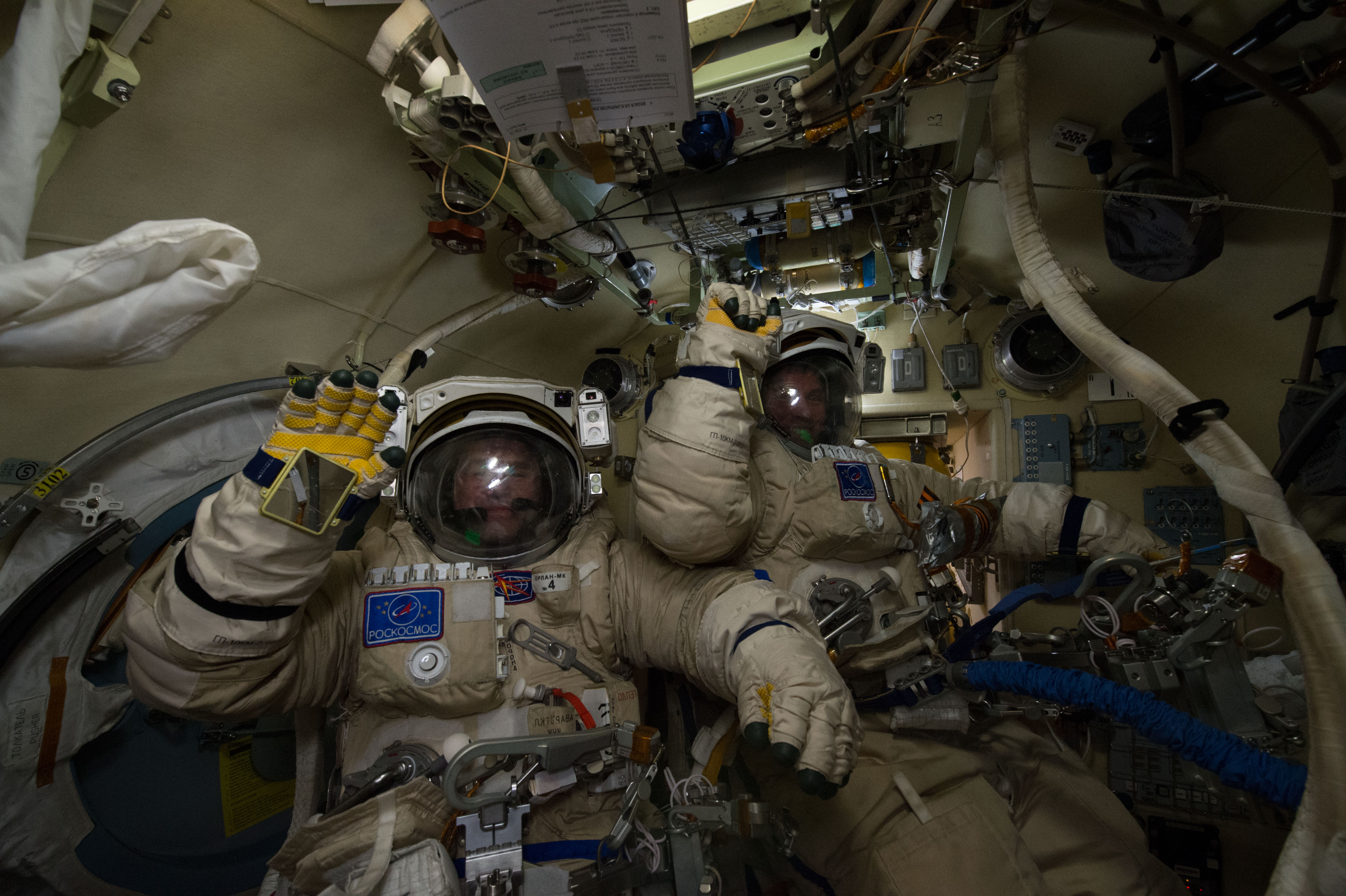
Malenchenko and Volkov

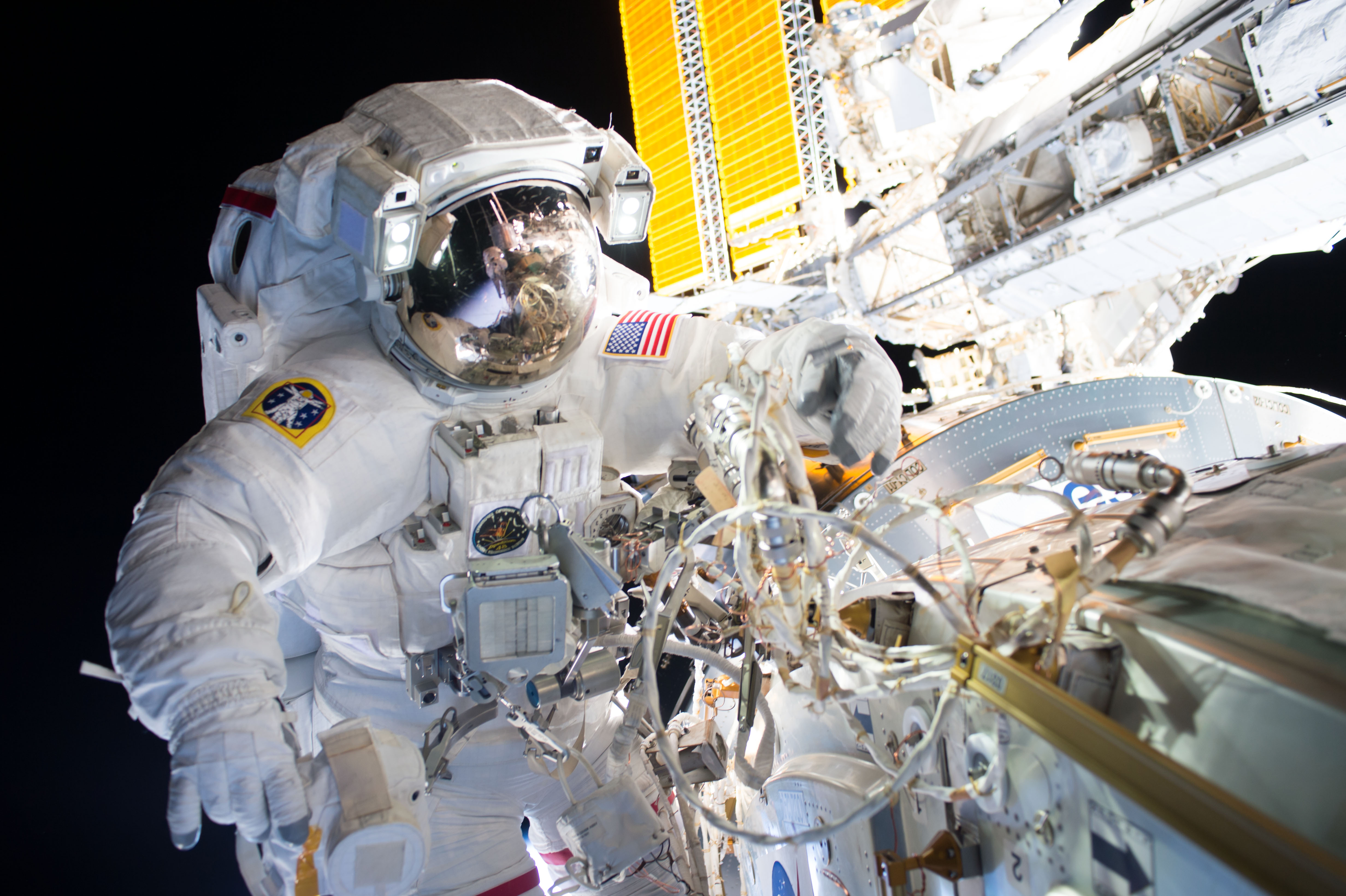
Jeff Williams during EVA

=== 2017 spacewalks ===
#	Start date/time	Duration	End time	Spacecraft	Crew	Remarks
385	6 January; 12:23	6 hours, 31 minutes	18:54	Expedition 50; ISS Quest	(United States) Robert S. Kimbrough; (United States) Peggy Whitson	The crew completed the installation of new batteries on the Station's power channel 3A, and then executed a series of tasks to get ahead for the next EVA. Kimbrough collected photos of the AMS-02, then they removed a broken light on the S3 truss and routed Ethernet cables on the Z1 truss.
386	13 January; 11:22	5 hours, 58 minutes	17:20	Expedition 50; ISS Quest	(United States) Robert S. Kimbrough; (France) Thomas Pesquet	The crew completed the installation of new batteries on the Station's power channel 1A, and then executed a series of get ahead tasks. First they installed a new camera on the Mobile Transporter Relay Assembly, then Pesquet replaced a Worksite Interface Adapter on Canadarm-2 and collected photos of Z1 truss and S0 truss, meanwhile Kimbrough removed 2 handrails from the Destiny module. Then they picked up a bundle of covers and brought them to the Tranquillity module where will be installed when Pressurized Mating Adapter 3 will be moved from Node 3 to Node 2. When removed, the PMA's Common Berthing Mechanism will be covered up to protect it from the space environment.
387	24 March; 11:24	6 hours, 34 minutes	17:58	Expedition 50; ISS Quest	(United States) Robert S. Kimbrough; (France) Thomas Pesquet	Kimbrough replaced the External Control Zone 2 (EXT-2) Multiplexer-Demultiplexer (MDM) with an upgraded "EPIC MDM" and prepared PMA-3 for its robotic relocation on Sunday. Pesquet inspected the Radiator Beam Valve Module for ammonia leaks, then lubricated one of the Latching End Effectors of Dextre. Kimbrough then replaced a pair of cameras on the Kibo module, and a light on one of the CETA carts.
388	30 March; 11:29	7 hours, 4 minutes	18:33	Expedition 50; ISS Quest	(United States) Robert S. Kimbrough; (United States) Peggy Whitson	Kimbrough replaced the External Control Zone 1 (EXT-1) Multiplexer-Demultiplexer (MDM) with an upgraded "EPIC MDM" while Whitson connected heater power and heater feedback telemetry to enable PMA-3 to be repressurized, then released a series of straps to free up a cover that protected the APAS. The astronauts then installed 4 axial shields on PMA-3's former location on Tranquillity module and installed covers on PMA-3.
389	12 May; 13:01	4 hours, 13 minutes	17:21	Expedition 51; ISS Quest	(United States) Peggy Whitson; (United States) Jack D. Fischer	EXT-1 MDM Remove & Replace; Lab EWC Antenna Install
390	23 May; 11:20	2 hours, 46 minutes	14:06	Expedition 51; ISS Quest	(United States) Peggy Whitson; (United States) Jack D. Fischer	Throughout this hurriedly planned 'contingency' spacewalk, both Fischer and Whitson successfully replaced a failed multiplexer-demultiplexer (MDM), and installed a pair of antennas on station to enhance wireless communication for future spacewalks.
391	17 August; 14:36	7 hours, 34 minutes	22:10	Expedition 52; ISS Pirs	(Russia) Fyodor Yurchikhin; (Russia) Sergey Ryazansky	Test of an upgraded version of the Orlan space suit, the Orlan MKS; Restavratsiya retrieval; Deployment of 5 small satellites; Impakt installation; Adapter installation on Poisk sensors; BKDO (БКДО) reposition; Test sample collection; Hand rail and exposure init installation
392	5 October; 12:05	6 hours, 55 minutes	19:00	Expedition 53; ISS Quest	(United States) Randolph Bresnik; (United States) Mark Vande Hei	Removal of LEE-A from SSRMS; Removal of POA LEE via 6 EDF Bolts; Installation of POA LEE as new SSRMS LEE-A; Installation of former LEE-A on POA; SSRMS Power-Up and Checkout
393	10 October; 11:56	6 hours, 26 minutes	18:22	Expedition 53; ISS Quest	(United States) Randolph Bresnik; (United States) Mark Vande Hei	ESP-1 PFCS Rotate by 90°; CP9 Camera Group R/R; LEE-A Ballscrew Lubrication; POA LEE Socket Removal; MT Camera Lens Replacement; Hand Rail Removal (x2)
394	20 October; 11:47	6 hours, 49 minutes	18:36	Expedition 53; ISS Quest	(United States) Randolph Bresnik; (United States) Joseph M. Acaba	Dextre EOTP Fuse Replacement; Canadarm2 LEE-A CLA Remove and Replace; CP3 HD Camera Installation; MLI Removal from ORUs (x2)

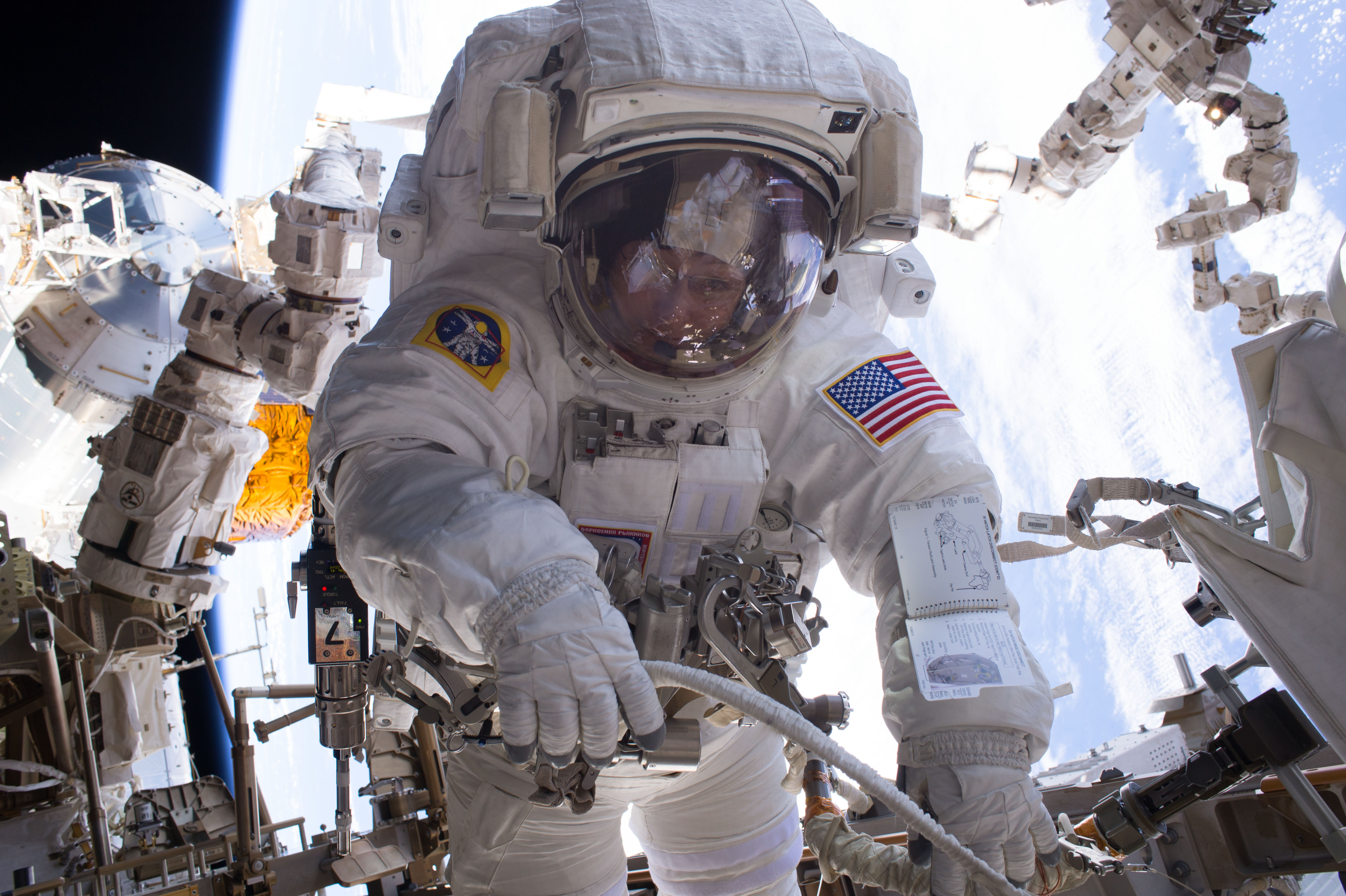
Peggy Whitson

=== 2018 spacewalks ===
#	Start date/time	Duration	End time	Spacecraft	Crew	Remarks
395	23 January; 11:49	7 hours, 24 minutes	19:13	Expedition 54; ISS Quest	(United States) Mark Vande Hei; (United States) Scott Tingle	Replacement of Latching End Effector-B (LEE-B) for the Space Station Remote Manipulator System (SSRMS)
396	2 February; 15:34	8 hours, 13 minutes	23:47	Expedition 54; ISS Pirs	(Russia) Alexander Misurkin; (Russia) Anton Shkaplerov	Remove and replacement of an electronics box for a high-gain communications antenna on the Zvezda service module
397	16 February; 12:00	5 hours, 57 minutes	17:57	Expedition 54; ISS Quest	(United States) Mark Vande Hei; (Japan) Norishige Kanai	Finished removal and replacement of Latching End Effector on POA, Replaced LEE Camera, Installed Ground Strap on Canadarm2, Brought failed LEE inside, Lubricated Canadarm2, Moved Tool Platform on Dextre, Adjusted Struts on Flex Hose Rotary Coupler.
398	29 March; 13:33	6 hours, 10 minutes	19:43	Expedition 55; ISS Quest	(United States) Andrew J. Feustel; (United States) Richard R. Arnold	Installed two Wi-Fi antennas on the Node 3 module in preparation for the arrival of ECOSTRESS on SpaceX CRS-15, removed ammonia jumpers and inspected two working jumpers on the stations truss, replaced camera and lights used to film NASA TV
399	16 May; 11:39	6 hours, 31 minutes	18:10	Expedition 55; ISS Quest	(United States) Andrew J. Feustel; (United States) Richard R. Arnold	Transferred a Pump Flow Control Subassembly over to Dextre stowed failed PFCS on ESP-1, Replaced camera and lights used to film NASA TV, Replaced Space to Ground Transceiver Controller, Performed get aheads to Install handrails on Radiator Grapple Bars on S1, Removed thermal blankets and MLI from two Direct Current Switching Units on ESP-2, Prepped the Flex Hose Rotary Coupler on S1 for replacement. Spacewalk suffered a 7-minute delay because of a water leak which formed ice crystals inside the airlock.
400	14 June; 13:06	6 hours, 49 minutes	19:55	Expedition 56; ISS Quest	(United States) Andrew J. Feustel; (United States) Richard R. Arnold	Feustel and Arnold installed new high-definition cameras near IDA 2 mated to the front end of the station's Harmony module. The additions will provide enhanced views during the final phase of approach and docking of the SpaceX Crew Dragon and Boeing CST 100 Starliner commercial crew spacecraft that will soon begin launching from American soil.; The astronauts also swapped out a camera assembly on the starboard truss of the station used to film NASA TV and closed an aperture door on the CATS experiment outside the Japanese Kibo module in preparation for disposal on SpaceX CRS 15 and replacement by its successor, ECOSTRESS. Get aheads involved relocating an adjustable grapple bar to the S1 Truss and securing the Flex Hose Rotary Coupler in preparation for replacement on the next spacewalk. During the spacewalk Feustel beat Jerry Ross, his STS 125 crewmate John Grunsfeld, Fyoder Yurchikhin, and Peggy Whitson to become third on the list of all time space walkers.
401	15 August; 16:17	7 hours, 46 minutes	00:03 on 16 August	Expedition 56; ISS Pirs	(Russia) Oleg Artemyev; (Russia) Sergey Prokopyev	Deployed four CubeSats built by Russian students; Installed antennas and cables for the Icarus animal-tracking device; Retrieved two materials exposure packages from the Zvezda hull
402	11 December; 15:59	7 hours, 45 minutes	21:44	Expedition 57; ISS Pirs	(Russia) Oleg Kononenko; (Russia) Sergey Prokopyev	Inspected damage to the hull of Soyuz MS-09. Retrieved external science experiments.

=== 2019 spacewalks ===
#	Start date/time	Duration	End time	Spacecraft	Crew	Remarks
403	22 March; 12:01	6 hours, 39 minutes	18:40	Expedition 59; ISS Quest	(United States) Anne McClain; (United States) Nick Hague	Connected 3 new Li-ion batteries to replace 6 old Ni-H batteries on power channel 4A of the P4 truss segment.; Cleaned up debris on Unity's common berthing mechanism using Kapton tape.; Secured a tieback for restraints on the solar array blanket box.
404	29 March; 11:42	6 hours, 45 minutes	18:27	Expedition 59; ISS Quest	(United States) Nick Hague; (United States) Christina Koch	Connected 3 new Li-ion batteries to replace 6 old Ni-H batteries on power channel 2A of the P4 truss segment.; Disconnected cables and relocated an adapter plate to enable Canadarm2 to remove a failed Li-ion battery.
405	8 April; 11:31	6 hours, 29 minutes	18:00	Expedition 59; ISS Quest	(United States) Anne McClain; (Canada) David Saint-Jacques	Installed jumper cables between the Unity module and the S0 truss to establish redundant power to Canadarm2.; Installed cables to provide for more expansive wireless communications coverage outside the orbital complex.; Relocated an adapter plate from the 22 March spacewalk in preparation for future battery upgrade operations
406	29 May; 15:42	6 hours, 1 minute	21:43	Expedition 59; ISS Pirs	(Russia) Oleg Kononenko; (Russia) Aleksey Ovchinin	Removed experiments from the Pirs docking compartment and cleaned the windows.; Installed a handrail to connect Zarya to Poisk and re-positioned the Plume Measuring Unit.; Moved to the Zvesda Service Module and removed and jettisoned the Plasma Monitoring Units.; Wished happy birthday to Alexei Leonov who is the first spacewalker and is celebrating his 85th birthday on 30 May. Also brought a picture of Leonov into space with them.
407	21 August; 12:27	6 hours, 32 minutes	18:59	Expedition 60; ISS Quest	(United States) Nick Hague; (United States) Andrew R. Morgan	Hague and Morgan installed the final International Docking Adapter on the Harmony Module. Task for this spacewalk was identical to Spacewalk 194 and required work by both spacewalkers and Dextre to get the docking port installed in preparation for its test by the Boeing CST-100 Starliner which will occur at the end of October. The crew also routed cables and installed Wi-Fi routers for upcoming experiments.
408	6 October; 11:39	7 hours, 1 minute	18:40	Expedition 61; ISS Quest	(United States) Christina Koch; (United States) Andrew R. Morgan	This spacewalk was the first of Expedition 61 and the first of a series of 5 to replace and improve ISS batteries on the P6 truss.
409	11 October; 11:38	6 hours, 45 minutes	18:23	Expedition 61; ISS Quest	(United States) Andrew R. Morgan; (United States) Christina Koch	This spacewalk was the second of Expedition 61 and the second of a series of 5 to replace and improve ISS batteries on the P6 truss. Before they went out the hatch Mission Control Moscow relayed to the crew Alexei Leonov had died and this spacewalk is dedicated to him. As the crew came in and took off their suits each gave a choice of words before station commander Luca Parmitano said "Farewell Alexei, and ad astra."
410	18 October; 11:38	7 hours, 17 minutes	18:55	Expedition 61; ISS Quest	(United States) Christina Koch; (United States) Jessica Meir	This spacewalk was to be the third of Expedition 61 and the third of a series of five to replace and improve ISS batteries on the P6 truss. Some of the battery swaps were delayed to EVA 222 because of a failure in a Battery Charge Discharge Unit on the P6 Truss taking the 4B battery channel partially offline. Koch and Meir replaced the failed unit and brought it inside. They wrapped up the spacewalk by installing a stanchion on the Columbus Module and routing a cable on the Destiny lab module. This was the first all-female spacewalk. During the spacewalk, President Donald Trump called the station and congratulated Koch and Meir on this milestone.
411	15 November; 11:39	6 hours, 39 minutes	18:18	Expedition 61; ISS Quest	(Italy) Luca Parmitano; (United States) Andrew Morgan	First of a series of four spacewalks to repair the Alpha Magnetic Spectrometer which suffered a power failure last year in one of its four cooling pumps limiting the operation of the experiment. Parmitano and Morgan went outside and removed a cover plate from AMS and jettisoned it into space to make way for a cryo pump that they will assemble between spacewalks. Some of the bolts put up a fight but Parmitano got them all out. The highlight of the spacewalk is when Andrew Morgan threw the cover plate overboard and it drifted off aft of the station into the vacuum of space. The plate will stay in orbit for a few days until the end of December when it enters the atmosphere and burns up. The crew also removed several carbon fiber strips around fluid lines and installed handrails and grapple bars as get-ahead task.
412	22 November; 12:02	6 hours, 33 minutes	18:35	Expedition 61; ISS Quest	(Italy) Luca Parmitano; (United States) Andrew Morgan	The second in a series of four spacewalks to repair the AMS. Parmitano and Morgan cut fluid lines and installed a vent on the AMS Experiment to prep the old cooling pump for removal on the third spacewalk. Parmitano and Morgan also routed cables and installed a new power supply to power the pumps when they are installed on the third spacewalk.
413	2 December; 11:31	6 hours, 2 minutes	17:33	Expedition 61; ISS Quest	(Italy) Luca Parmitano; (United States) Andrew Morgan	The third in a series of four spacewalks to repair the AMS. Parmitano and Morgan went out on the third spacewalk and installed the cryo pump and routed fluid and electrical lines to power the pump. Flight controllers in Houston, Huntsville, and at CERN activated the experiment and radioed to the crew that AMS passed with flying colors. The crew finished the spacewalk by doing a get-ahead task by covering AMS with thermal blanket.

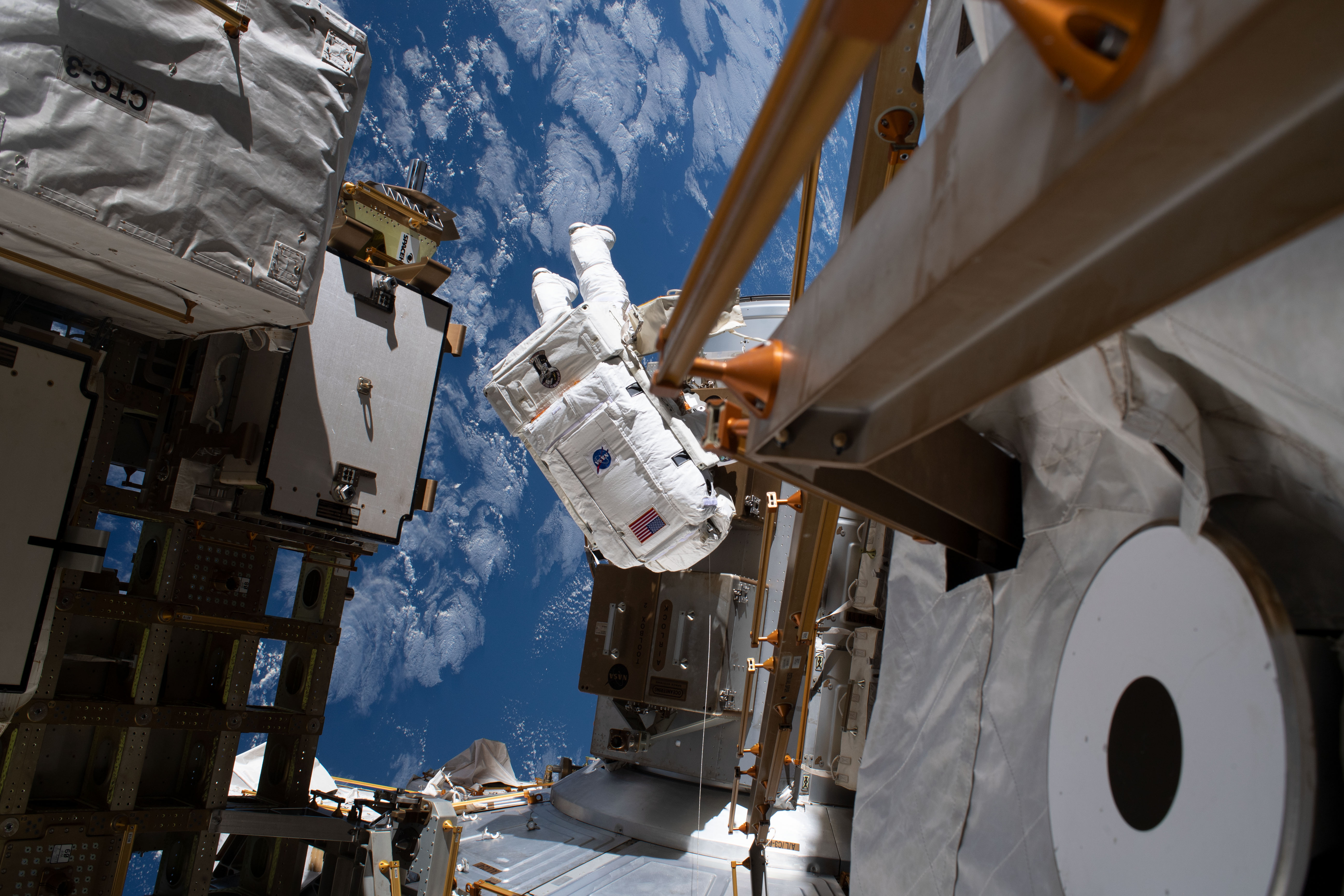
Jessica Meir during first all-female spacewalk in history on 18 October 2019

== 2020–2024 spacewalks ==
Spacewalk beginning and ending times are given in Coordinated Universal Time (UTC).

=== 2020 spacewalks ===
#	Start date/time	Duration	End time	Spacecraft	Crew	Remarks
414	15 January; 11:35	7 hours, 29 minutes	19:04	Expedition 61; ISS Quest	(United States) Christina Koch; (United States) Jessica Meir	The fourth in a series of five spacewalks to replace the batteries on the P6 Truss. Spacewalk suffered a 15-minute delay when Koch lost her helmet lights and camera. Meir managed to attach a hook onto the camera to prevent it from floating away and stowed it in Koch's tool bag. The spacewalkers managed to replace two batteries plus a third as a getahead task and had to stay in signal range of the WETA antennas so Meir could check on Koch at night who did not have any helmet lights. The spacewalkers will replace the camera between spacewalks and will head back out to replace the final three batteries on the next spacewalk.
415	20 January; 11:35	6 hours, 58 minutes	18:33	Expedition 61; ISS Quest	(United States) Christina Koch; (United States) Jessica Meir	The fifth and final in a series of five spacewalks to replace the batteries on the P6 Truss. Koch and Meir managed to get all the batteries replaced and stored two old ones on the exposed pallet to return to earth on HTV-9 where they will be incinerated on reentry. Koch and Meir finished the day by sending down a message to commemorate Martin Luther King Jr. Day. This spacewalk moved Koch up to third place and Meir up to fourth place on the all-time female spacewalker list.
416	25 January; 12:04	6 hours, 16 minutes	18:20	Expedition 61; ISS Quest	(United States) Andrew Morgan; (Italy) Luca Parmitano	The fourth and final in a series of four spacewalks to repair the AMS. Spacewalk suffered a 10-minute delay when a strap got stuck in the hatch preventing depressurization of the airlock. The two spacewalkers completed all the task and at 17:30 hours, Luca Parmitano opened a valve to start the flow of CO_{2} gas to AMS and contacted CERN to turn the experiment on. AMS passed all test and worked flawlessly. A leak was found in a cooling line but Parmitano patched it and the spacewalk resumed without incident. As a getahead task Parmitano and Morgan cleaned and replaced glare filters on the NASA TV cameras used to film the spacewalk.
417	26 June; 11:32	6 hours, 7 minutes	17:39	Expedition 63; ISS Quest	(United States) Christopher Cassidy; (United States) Robert Behnken	Behnken and Cassidy removed five of six nickel-hydrogen batteries for one of two power channels for the starboard 6 (S6) truss, installed two of three new lithium-ion batteries, and installed two of three associated adapter plates that are used to complete the power circuit to the new batteries.
418	1 July; 10:13	6 hours, 1 minute	16:14	Expedition 63; ISS Quest	(United States) Christopher Cassidy; (United States) Robert Behnken	Behnken and Cassidy removed the last of six nickel-hydrogen batteries for disposal. They also connected the last of the three lithium-ion batteries and its adapter plate to complete the circuit to the new battery for the starboard 6 (S6) truss.
419	16 July; 11:10	6 hours	17:10	Expedition 63; ISS Quest	(United States) Christopher Cassidy; (United States) Robert Behnken	Cassidy and Behnken replaced batteries that provide power for the International Space Station's solar arrays on the starboard truss of the complex. They removed six aging nickel-hydrogen batteries, and installed three new lithium-ion batteries that are more efficient. This work nearly completes a three-and-a-half-year effort to upgrade the International Space Station's power system.
420	21 July; 11:12	5 hours, 29 minutes	16:41	Expedition 63; ISS Quest	(United States) Christopher Cassidy; (United States) Robert Behnken	Cassidy and Behnken installed a protective housing with two robotic external leak locator units (RELL). They also removed two lifting fixtures at the base of the station's solar arrays. They then prepared for the installation of the Nanorax airlock, arriving in November. Finally, they routed Ethernet cables and removed a lens filter cover from an external camera.
421	18 November; 15:12	6 hours, 47 minutes	21:59	Expedition 64; ISS Poisk	(Russia) Sergey Ryzhikov; (Russia) Sergey Kud-Sverchkov	The first spacewalk from the Poisk module. Ryzhikov and Kud-Sverchkov completed the first set of tasks to prepare for the decommissioning, undocking, and disposal of the Pirs module, and for the arrival of a new Russian research module called Nauka. The work completed included an attempted replacement of a flow control regulator panel on the Functional Cargo Block (FGB) module, re-routing cables, retrieving hardware that measures space debris impacts, repositioning an instrument used to measure the residue from orientation thruster firings, and removing an experiment. The cosmonauts were unable to replace the flow control regulator panel because a bolt would not release on the transfer container of the new regulator.

=== 2021 spacewalks ===
#	Start date/time	Duration	End time	Spacecraft	Crew	Remarks
422	27 January; 11:28	6 hours, 56 minutes	18:24	Expedition 64; ISS Quest	(United States) Michael S. Hopkins; (United States) Victor Glover	Spacewalk to activate and install the Airbus Bartolomeo exposed experiment platform and the Columbus Ka band Terminal (COL-Ka) onto Columbus. Remove H fixtures from the P-6 Truss in preparation for installation of upgrades to the solar arrays. Due to issues with the installation of Bartolomeo, only four out of the six cables could be installed. The platform is "partially operational and in a safe configuration" according to NASA; the final two cables will be installed on a future spacewalk.
423	1 February; 12:56	5 hours, 20 minutes	18:16	Expedition 64; ISS Quest	(United States) Michael S. Hopkins; (United States) Victor Glover	US EVA-70. Spacewalk to replace batteries that store power from the station's solar arrays and upgrade several of the station's external cameras.
424	28 February; 11:12	7 hours, 4 minutes	18:33	Expedition 64; ISS Quest	(United States) Kathleen Rubins; (United States) Victor Glover	US EVA-71. Installation of a modification kit onto the 2B Mast Canister Assembly where a future Roll Out Solar Array will be mounted.
425	5 March; 11:37	6 hours, 56 minutes	18:33	Expedition 64; ISS Quest	(United States) Kathleen Rubins; (Japan) Soichi Noguchi	US EVA-72. Installation of a modification kit onto the 4B Mast Canister Assembly where a future Roll Out Solar Array will be mounted.
426	13 March; 13:14	6 hours, 47 minutes	20:01	Expedition 64; ISS Quest	(United States) Michael S. Hopkins; (United States) Victor Glover	US EVA-73. Spacewalk to service the station's cooling system and communications gear.
427	2 June; 5:53	7 hours, 19 minutes	13:12	Expedition 64; ISS Poisk	(Russia) Oleg Novitsky; (Russia) Pyotr Dubrov	Decommissioning of Pirs module. It will be removed from the ISS no earlier than 17 July 2021 to make room for the new Nauka science module. First spacewalks for Novitsky and Dubrov.
428	16 June; 12:11	7 hours, 15 minutes	19:26	Expedition 65; ISS Quest	(United States) Shane Kimbrough; (France) Thomas Pesquet	US EVA-74. Installation of the new ISS Roll Out Solar Arrays (IROSA) delivered on CRS-22.
429	20 June; 11:42	6 hours, 28 minutes	18:10	Expedition 65; ISS Quest	(United States) Shane Kimbrough; (France) Thomas Pesquet	US EVA-75. Installation of the new ISS Roll Out Solar Arrays (IROSA) (continued).
430	25 June; 11:52	6 hours, 45 minutes	18:37	Expedition 65; ISS Quest	(United States) Shane Kimbrough; (France) Thomas Pesquet	US EVA-76. Installation of the second set of IROSAs.
431	4 July; 00:11	6 hours, 46 minutes	06:57	Shenzhou 12; TSS Tianhe	(China) Liu Boming; (China) Tang Hongbo	First EVA from the Tiangong space station. The taikonauts tested an updated version of the Feitian space suit, completed installation of the station's robotic arm, and installed exterior equipment for use on future missions, including a camera lifting bracket.
432	20 August; 00:38	5 hours, 55 minutes	06:33	Shenzhou 12; TSS Tianhe	(China) Nie Haisheng; (China) Liu Boming	Second EVA from the Tiangong space station. Taikonauts tested spacecraft equipment, installed a backup thermal control pump, and installed and raised panoramic camera D on the Tianhe core module.
433	3 September; 14:41	7 hours, 54 minutes	22:35	Expedition 65; ISS Poisk	(Russia) Oleg Novitsky; (Russia) Pyotr Dubrov	Integration of the new Nauka science module.
434	9 September; 14:51	7 hours, 25 minutes	22:16	Expedition 65; ISS Poisk	(Russia) Oleg Novitsky; (Russia) Pyotr Dubrov	Integration of the new Nauka science module (continued).
435	12 September; 12:15	6 hours, 54 minutes	19:09	Expedition 65; ISS Quest	(Japan) Akihiko Hoshide; (France) Thomas Pesquet	US EVA-77. Installation of a support bracket onto which a future solar array will be mounted.
436	7 November; 10:51	6 hours, 25 minutes	17:16	Shenzhou 13; TSS Tianhe	(China) Zhai Zhigang; (China) Wang Yaping	Third EVA from the Tiangong space station. Taikonauts installed a dual-arm connector to the station's robotic arm along with testing EVA equipment. Wang Yaping became the first Chinese woman to perform an EVA.
437	2 December; 11:15	6 hours, 32 minutes	17:47	Expedition 66; ISS Quest	(United States) Thomas Marshburn; (United States) Kayla Barron	US EVA-78. EVA to replace a faulty S-Band Antenna Subassembly (SASA).
438	26 December; 10:44	6 hours, 11 minutes	16:55	Shenzhou 13; TSS Tianhe	(China) Zhai Zhigang; (China) Ye Guangfu	Fourth EVA from the Tiangong space station. Taikonauts deployed panoramic camera C, installed a foot restraint platform, and tested various methods of moving objects outside the station.

=== 2022 spacewalks ===
#	Start date/time	Duration	End time	Spacecraft	Crew	Remarks
439	19 January; 12:17	7 hours, 11 minutes	19:28	Expedition 66; ISS Poisk	(Russia) Anton Shkaplerov; (Russia) Pyotr Dubrov	Spacewalk to configure Prichal to support visiting vehicles. The EVA (Russian EVA-51) was the first of six spacewalks over 2022 to fully integrate Nauka into the ISS.
440	15 March; 12:11	6 hours, 54 minutes	19:06	Expedition 66; ISS Quest	(United States) Raja Chari; (United States) Kayla Barron	First spacewalk to install the IROSA mounting brackets on the S4 Truss. Tasks included installing the struts, mounting brackets, and triangles at the 3A Array in preparation for the delivery of the IROSA solar arrays on SpaceX CRS-25 at the end of May. The astronauts also tied back insulation on S6 so Dextre can replace the Battery Charge Discharge Modules at this location which has shown signs of decay and will be replaced at a later date. As a get ahead the astronauts photographed a worn keel pin cover which has come loose on one of the pins that were used to secure the airlock in the shuttle bay when it was launched.
441	23 March; 12:32	6 hours, 54 minutes	19:26	Expedition 66; ISS Quest	(United States) Raja Chari; (Germany) Matthias Maurer	The astronauts will install and vent ammonia jumpers on the P1 Truss and reposition a radiator beam valve module which has been giving them trouble. The astronauts will also route cables, install cable clamps on the Bartolomeo platform, tie back thermal insulation on the Kibo Exposed Facility Berthing Mechanism, break torque on the P4 electronics boxes, replace Camera 8 on the truss which has a bad filter and light, outfit the radiator grapple bars for a future spacewalk, and also do other maintenance task outside the station.
442	18 April; 15:01	6 hours, 37 minutes	21:37	Expedition 67; ISS Poisk	(Russia) Oleg Artemyev; (Russia) Denis Matveev	Third spacewalk in a series to activate Nauka and Prichal and to commission ERA. During the spacewalk the cosmonauts will remove covers and install electrical cables so ERA can be activated at the end of the spacewalk. They will also install handrails, experiments, and work platforms outside, and break torque on bolts that secure ERA to the lab.
443	28 April; 14:58	7 hours, 42 minutes	22:40	Expedition 67; ISS Poisk	(Russia) Oleg Artemyev (Russia) Denis Matveev	Fourth spacewalk in a series to activate Nauka and Prichal and to commission ERA. During the spacewalk the cosmonauts jettisoned thermal covers, released launch locks, and walked off the arm to its stowage point at worksite 2 on the forward face of the lab where it was latched in place. Because of time they did not release the grapple at worksite 1 and the arm is bent over the solar arrays. The cosmonauts also installed handrails on Nauka and the arm and deployed a banner for Victory Day on the side of the station. ERA will be checked out inside before it moved remotely to its grapple point at worksite 3 where it will be secured until the next spacewalk when it will be moved to worksite 4. During the spacewalk a cable got snagged which was deployed during EVA 50 back in January which caused issues with the KURS antennas on Prichal which forced Soyuz MS-21 to be flown in manually. Artemyev tied down the cables with wire ties and the antenna was redeployed into a safe configuration.
444	21 July; 14:50	7 hours, 5 minutes	21:55	Expedition 67; ISS Poisk	(Russia) Oleg Artemyev (Italy) Samantha Cristoforetti	Russian cosmonaut Oleg Artemyev and Italian astronaut Samantha Cristoforetti worked on the ERA robotic arm as part of the work scheduled to commission the Nauka module and robotic arm. They launched two Tsiolkovsky-Ryazan (No. 1–2) and eight YUZGU-55 (No. 5–12) satellites, installed an ERA grapple point on Poisk to facilitate future relocation of the experiment airlock on the next spacewalk, translated a work platform over to Nauka, reconfigured ERA and set the control panel from grapple mode to stowed, replaced a camera port window on ERA that prevented grappling on the previous spacewalk, replaced MLI blankets on Nauka that were knocked loose by the thruster firings when the module arrived, and installed retainers on Strela 1 on Poisk. The final task to relocate Strela 2 on Zarya over to Poisk and install its retainer was deferred to the next spacewalk because they ran out of time and they had a late start. Cristoforetti become the first female European astronaut to perform a spacewalk, and only the third woman to perform a spacewalk using the Russian Orlan spacesuit (after Svetlana Savitskaya and Peggy Whitson).
445	17 August; 13:53	4 hours, 1 minute	17:54	Expedition 67; ISS Poisk	(Russia) Oleg Artemyev (Russia) Denis Matveev	Sixth spacewalk in a series to outfit Nauka and to prepare the Russian Segment for module transfers which will take place in the fall. The primary task to install cameras on the elbow joint was completed on time and both cameras passed their telemetry checkouts. The final tasks to relocate the ERA control panel, set the arm back to "grapple mode", and remove the launch rings from the wrist of ERA will be moved to the next spacewalk. Artemyev was in the process of removing the launch ring at worksite 2 from ERA when he suffered a voltage drop in his spacesuit batteries. Mission Control Moscow ordered him back inside the airlock where he connected to internal power to recharge his suit. Because they were ahead and then behind the timeline, in light of the battery issue Mission Control Moscow gave the order to terminate the EVA at 16:34 GMT and the spacewalk concluded at 17:54 GMT, 4 hours, and 1 minute into the spacewalk. Artemyev was never in any danger and they will be replacing the battery before the next spacewalk. Because of the early EVA termination, the getahead task to relocate Strela 2 over to Poisk was also moved to the next spacewalk along with the other tasks.
446	1 September, 10:26	6 hours, 7 minutes	16:33	Shenzhou 14; TSS Wentian	(China) Chen Dong (China) Liu Yang	Fifth EVA from the Tiangong space station and first EVA from Wentian's airlock. Taikonauts installed an extended pump set on the exterior of Wentian, raised panoramic camera B, installed an exterior workbench, and tested procedures for an emergency return to the station.
447	2 September; 13:25	7 hours, 47 minutes	21:12	Expedition 67; ISS Poisk	(Russia) Oleg Artemyev (Russia) Denis Matveev	Seventh in a series of spacewalks to outfit Nauka and to prepare ERA for operations. The spacewalkers completed the task that were moved from the previous two spacewalks and installed two payload adapters on Nauka. Because of time and the lack of consumables the task to break torque on bolts that secure the airlock and the radiator to Rassvet was deferred to the next spacewalk. This was the longest EVA of Expedition 67 and the final one of this mission.
448	17 September; 05:35	4 hours, 12 minutes	09:47	Shenzhou 14; TSS Wentian	(China) Chen Dong (China) Cai Xuzhe	Sixth EVA from the Tiangong space station. Taikonauts completed the installation of foot restraints and extravehicular workbenches with support from the station's small robotic arm, performed further work on the extended pump set, and further verified EVA emergency rescue procedures.
449	15 November; 14:14	7 hours, 11 minutes	21:25	Expedition 68; ISS Quest	(United States) Josh Cassada (United States) Frank Rubio	Cassada and Rubio installed the final IROSA mounting bracket on the S6 Truss at Array 1B. As part of get-ahead tasks, they prepared the 3A mounting bracket at P4 for the delivery of 2 IROSAs on the 18th and routed cables along the truss to be mated at the end of EVA 3. Because of time they did not install the slip collars on S6 and the cable routing was partly completed. The S6 cables will be routed on a later spacewalk when IROSA arrives.
450	17 November; 03:16	5 hours, 34 minutes	08:50	Shenzhou 14; TSS Wentian	(China) Chen Dong (China) Cai Xuzhe	Seventh EVA from the Tiangong space station. Taikonauts installed an inter-chamber connection device between Tianhe and Mengtian, raised panoramic A on Wentian, and installed a small mechanical arm power-assisted handle.
451	17 November; 14:39	6 hours, 25 minutes	21:07	Expedition 68; ISS Quest	(United States) Josh Cassada; (United States) Frank Rubio	Eighth in a series of spacewalks to outfit Nauka and to prepare ERA for operations. The spacewalkers change a grapple fixture so the airlock can be used as a base point for the arm, broke torque on bolts that secure the airlock and radiator to Rassvet, removed launch restraints from the radiator, vented nitrogen jumpers, replaced a retainer on Strela 2 with one that has a stop, and transferred a MLM outfitting work platform called the SKKO, that is, the Nauka Means of attachment of large payloads over to Nauka and installed it at the ERA base point facing aft where ERA used to be, when it was launched.
452	3 December; 12:16	7 hours, 5 minutes	19:21	Expedition 68; ISS Quest	(United States) Josh Cassada; (United States) Frank Rubio	Assisted by Canadarm 2, Cassada and Rubio installed an IROSA at Array 3A and connected it to the US power system. The spacewalkers undid bolts and installed cables and at 17:37 GMT the array was deployed and is receiving power. As part of get-ahead tasks, they prepared the 4A array for the next spacewalk, demated the 1B array, broke torque on the P4 electronic boxes, and installed cables along the truss to be mated at the end of EVA 5. Spacewalk faced a delay when Cassada's suit did not power up. Troubleshooting steps were done and power was restored to Cassada's suit so they could continue the spacewalk. Nick Hague was ground IV.
453	22 December; 13:19	7 hours, 8 minutes	20:27	Expedition 68; ISS Quest	(United States) Josh Cassada; (United States) Frank Rubio	Assisted by Canadarm 2, Rubio and Cassada will install the fourth IROSA at Array 4A. Tasks include releasing bolts, installing cables, and deploying the array and connecting it to the US power system. Once these task are complete Rubio and Cassada will stow the array stowage beams on the carrier and remove their foot restraints from the arm in perpetration for astronaut Nicole Mann to grapple the carrier and load it into the trunk of SpaceX CRS-26 for disposal. If they have time they will photograph Soyuz MS-22 which has suffered a cooling leak in its primary radiator.

=== 2023 spacewalks ===
#	Start date/time	Duration	End time	Spacecraft	Crew	Remarks
454	20 January; 13:14	7 hours, 21 minutes	20:35	Expedition 68; ISS Quest	(Japan) Koichi Wakata; (United States) Nicole Mann	First spacewalk of 2023 to finish installation of the IROSA mounting brackets on the starboard side of the station. Wakata and Mann installed cables on the 1B Array at the S6 truss, which was not completed on the last spacewalk, tightened bolts and installed a terminator on a cable along with its connected jumper on the SSDCDC converter box to isolate the 1B array until the IROSA solar arrays are installed following the arrival of SpaceX CRS-28 in June. They also assembled and installed the IROSA mounting bracket onto the 1A array, which was also left incomplete on the last spacewalk. Wakata and Mann were unable to secure the final strut on the 1A solar array because of debris in the guide track of the mounting pad and only one of the jumpers was installed. The astronauts returned the strut to the Quest Airlock and will use special tools to clean the tracks before it is remounted on the next spacewalk. They were also unable to connect the cables for 1A due to time constraints. NASA astronaut Zena Cardman was Ground IV, assisted by JAXA astronaut Akihiko Hoshide, who was the Capcom for the astronauts inside the ISS during the spacewalk.
455	2 February; 12:45	6 hours, 41 minutes	19:26	Expedition 68; ISS Quest	(United States) Nicole Mann; (Japan) Koichi Wakata	Final spacewalk to install the mounting brackets for the 1A solar array in preparation for the delivery of IROSA on SpaceX CRS-28. Tasks included installing the final strut, securing the bolts on the 1A solar array, relocating foot restraints that were left on P6 inboard, and routing cables. NASA astronaut Zena Cardman was Ground IV.
456	9 February; 9:10	7 hours, 6 minutes	16:16	Shenzhou 15; TSS Wentian	(China) Fei Junlong; (China) Zhang Lu	Eighth EVA from the Tiangong space station. Tasks included the installation of a fourth external pump (Z01-04) on Mengtian and other tasks related to Mengtian's payload airlock.
457	2 March unknown time	In total exceeds 19 hours, 54 minutes (Note: The total duration for the four spacewalks during the Shenzhou 15 mission exceeded 27 hours.)	unknown time	Shenzhou 15; TSS Wentian	(China) Fei Junlong; (China) Zhang Lu	Ninth EVA from the Tiangong space station. Tasks completed were not revealed publicly and no announcement was given prior to the spacewalk. Date is reported later without specific time. Taikonauts installed electrical equipment, according to some Chinese-language sources.
458	30 March unknown time	In total exceeds 19 hours, 54 minutes	unknown time	Shenzhou 15; TSS Wentian	(China) Fei Junlong; (China) Zhang Lu	Tenth EVA from the Tiangong space station. Tasks completed were not revealed publicly and no announcement was given prior to the spacewalk. Date is reported later without specific time. Taikonauts installed and connected cables across the cabin.
459	15 April unknown time	In total exceeds 19 hours, 54 minutes	unknown time	Shenzhou 15; TSS Wentian	(China) Fei Junlong; (China) Zhang Lu	Eleventh EVA from the Tiangong space station. Tasks completed were not revealed publicly and no announcement was given prior to the spacewalk. Date is reported later without specific time. Taikonauts disposed of trash bags, completed the installation of the fifth extended pump (Z02-01) set on Mengtian, installed and connected cross-cabin cables, and installed the external load exposure platform and support brackets for later science and technology experiments.
460	19 April; 01:40	7 hours, 55 minutes	09:35	Expedition 69; ISS Poisk	(Russia) Sergey Prokopyev; (Russia) Dmitry Petelin	Ninth in a series of spacewalks to outfit Nauka and to prepare ERA for operations. The spacewalkers used ERA to pick up the radiator with the arm where it was relocated at the end of the spacewalk. They spacewalkers closed valves on the nitrogen jumpers, removed covers over the nitrogen jumpers, disconnected the radiator heater cable and capped it, removed bolts and launch restraints, and transferred the radiator over to Nauka and installed it into a socket on the forward face where it will be deployed at the end of EVA 4. As part of get-ahead tasks, they prepared the airlock for transfer to Nauka on the next spacewalk and stowed the ERA adapter on the airlock. Because of time and issues with matting the radiator the task to jettison the covers was moved to the next spacewalk. This was the longest spacewalk of this expedition and a critical one to get the lab activated.
461	28 April; 13:11	7 hours, 1 minute	20:12	Expedition 69; ISS Quest	(United States) Stephen Bowen; (United Arab Emirates) Sultan Al Neyadi	Bowen and Al Neyadi, who became the first Arab astronauts to perform a spacewalk, finished routing cables and secured the struts with MLI at the 1B and 1A solar arrays in preparation for the arrival of the IROSA arrays in June. The primary task to retrieve the Space to Ground Antenna (SASA) was deferred to the next spacewalk because a stuck bolt on the electronics box prevented the antenna from being released from the FRAM. NASA Astronaut Anne McClain was Ground IV CAPCOM.
462	4 May; 20:00	7 hours, 11 minutes	03:11	Expedition 69; ISS Poisk	(Russia) Sergey Prokopyev; (Russia) Dmitry Petelin	Tenth in a series of spacewalks to outfit Nauka and to prepare ERA for operations. The spacewalkers removed bolts, removed covers, disconnected cables, and used ERA to transfer the airlock over to Nauka where it was installed on the forward facing port. Once the airlock was installed they mated cables and jettisoned their trash which included hardware and covers from the previous spacewalks and this spacewalk. Spacewalk faced a delay when ERA entered an uncontrolled roll placing the airlock out of alinement. Prokopyev and Petelin improvised with a little elbow grease and got the airlock rotated into the correct position and got it latched in place. Spacewalk faced another delay when tape was found on the electrical connectors requiring Prokopyev to cut it before the cables were connected.
463	12 May; 15:47	5 hours, 14 minutes	23:01	Expedition 69; ISS Poisk	(Russia) Sergey Prokopyev; (Russia) Dmitry Petelin	Eleventh and final spacewalk to outfit Nauka and to prepare ERA for operations. To wrap up work on Nauka, the cosmonauts deployed the radiator, and installed nitrogen and ammonia jumpers to cool the Russian Segment and connected the radiator to electrical power, hydraulics, and mechanical connections. As a get-ahead task while the radiator was being filled with coolant the cosmonauts installed gap spanners on ERA's boom to allow for translation on future spacewalks.
464	9 June; 13:15	6 hours, 3 minutes	19:18	Expedition 69; ISS Quest	(United States) Stephen Bowen; (United States) Woody Hoburg	NASA astronauts Steve Bowen and Woody Hoburg exited the station's Quest airlock and installed an upgraded IROSA (International Space Station Roll-Out Solar Array) on the 1A power channel on the starboard truss of the station. Tasks included removing bolts, deploying the rollers, and installing cables before the solar array was picked up by Hoburg with assistance from Canadarm 2 and installed on the 1A solar array on the S4 Truss. The array was deployed at 16:32 hours, and is receiving power.
465	15 June; 12:42	5 hours, 35 minutes	18:17	Expedition 69; ISS Quest	(United States) Stephen Bowen; (United States) Woody Hoburg	NASA astronauts Steve Bowen and Woody Hoburg exited the station's Quest airlock to install the final upgraded IROSA (International Space Station Roll-Out Solar Array) on the 1B power channel on the starboard truss of the station. Tasks included removing bolts, deploying the rollers, and installing cables before the solar array was picked up by Hoburg with assistance from Canadarm 2 and installed on the 1B solar array on the S6 Truss. The array was deployed at 16:51 hours, and is receiving power. As part of getahead task they covered the cables in MLI and secured the struts, relocated their foot restraints inboard, and stowed the support beams on the flight support structure for disposal.
466	22 June; 14:24	6 hours, 24 minutes	20:48	Expedition 69; ISS Poisk	(Russia) Sergey Prokopyev; (Russia) Dmitry Petelin	Prokopyev and Petelin exited the Poisk airlock and routed an Ethernet cable to the port experiment frame on the Zvezda Service Module, jettisoned experiment hardware including the TMTC Monoblock antennas, the highspeed data transmission antenna, and the Seismo Prognos payload, installed a data transmission radio onto the port frame, removed experiments from the Zvezda Service Module, photographed Zvezda including the thrusters so they can patch the leak, inspected an antenna, and retrieved the Biorisk containers. As a getahead they cleaned the windows on the Russian segment, repositioned the Plume Measurement Unit, and jettisoned a towel.
467	20 July; 05:45	7 hours, 55 minutes	13:40	Shenzhou 16; TSS Wentian	(China) Jing Haipeng; (China) Zhu Yangzhu	Twelfth EVA from the Tiangong space station. Taikonauts installed and lifted the bracket for Tianhe panoramic camera B and unlocked and lifted panoramic camera A/B on Mengtian. Zhu Yangzhu became first Chinese flight engineer to conduct an extravehicular activity. The EVA set a new duration record for a Chinese spacewalk.
468	9 August; 14:44	6 hours, 35 minutes	21:19	Expedition 69; ISS Poisk	(Russia) Sergey Prokopyev; (Russia) Dmitry Petelin	Twelfth and final spacewalk to outfit Nauka and to prepare ERA for operations. Both cosmonauts ventured outside the station's Poisk Airlock to attach three debris shields to the Rassvet module. They also tested the sturdiness of the last MLM outfitting called the ERA portable workpost, that will be affixed to the end of the European robotic arm attached to the Nauka multipurpose laboratory module.
469	25 October; 17:49	7 hours, 41 minutes	01:30 (next day)	Expedition 70; ISS Poisk	(Russia) Oleg Kononenko; (Russia) Nikolai Chub	The cosmonauts ventured outside and installed a mini radar experiment on Nauka, launched a CubeSat which will test solar sails, and photographed the RTOd radiator and closed valves to isolate the radiator and vented residual coolant so plans can be done to fix a leaking cooling line that delayed two US spacewalks. During one of the vents, Kononenko got sprayed and the coolant got on one of his tethers. The tether was placed in a trash bag and stowed externally to decontaminate it, while Kononenko's suit was wiped down to prevent coolant from entering the station. During the radar deployment, one of the hinges got stuck. The cosmonauts will go out on the next spacewalk with a pole and lock the hinges so it can be deployed. During the satellite deployment, the telescoping booms did not come out and ground controllers are working to manually deploy them so the satellite can track the sun.
470	1 November; 12:05	6 hours, 42 minutes	18:47	Expedition 70; ISS Quest	(United States) Jasmin Moghbeli; (United States) Loral O'Hara	Moghbeli and O'Hara ventured outside and removed an H fixture from the 3B mass canister on the P4 truss in preparation for the arrival of the struts and the IROSA solar arrays in 2025. They also replaced a damaged Trundle Bearing under Cover 2 which had been giving them trouble in the past and greased the tracks before the new Trundle Bearing was installed on the port SARJ, secured a cable on Camera 8 which was shorting out a light used for dockings, and released wedge clamps on the SASA antenna. The primary task to retrieve the SASA antenna from ESP2 so it can be returned to Earth on SpaceX CRS-29 was moved to the next spacewalk because of issues removing the covers from the SARJ. O'Hara was not secured properly during the removal and had to be assisted by Moghbeli to get the cover stowed. During the spacewalk, the bag containing the grease gun was lost, but the tools were not needed and the bag posed no collision risk to the station. This was the fourth all-female spacewalk on the station, following Christina Koch and Jessica Meir's three spacewalks during Expedition 61.
471	21 December; 06:10	7 hours, 25 minutes	13:35	Shenzhou 17; TSS Wentian	(China) Tang Hongbo; (China) Tang Shengjie	Thirteenth EVA from the Tiangong space station. Tasks included a repair test of the Tianhe core module's solar panels, which have sustained minor damage caused by impacts of space debris and micrometeoroids.

=== 2024 spacewalks ===
#	Start date/time	Duration	End time	Spacecraft	Crew	Remarks
472	1 March; 21:30	7 hours, 52 minutes	05:32 (next day)	Shenzhou 17; TSS Wentian	(China) Tang Hongbo; (China) Jiang Xinlin	Fourteenth EVA from the Tiangong space station. Tasks included maintenance of the solar panels of the Tianhe core module, which have sustained minor damage caused by impacts of space debris and micrometeoroids; evaluation and analysis of the performance status of the solar panel power generation and also inspection of the status of the space station modules.
473	25 April; 14:57	4 hours, 36 minutes	19:33	Expedition 71; ISS Poisk	(Russia) Oleg Kononenko; (Russia) Nikolai Chub	The cosmonauts ventured out and released launch locks on the Mini Radar Unit to get it deployed and installed a series of experiments TKK and Kvartz onto Poisk including a monoblock payload adapter and boom and photograph the Russian Segment.The Cosmonauts also repositioned the Plume Measurement Unit, removed an ion radiation probe and jettisoned it, and retrieved the Biorisk canisters for return to Earth. The cosmonauts also wiped down the handrails on Nauka and Poisk to check for microbial growth and contamination from the radiator leak and from visiting vehicles and hydrazine from Nauka's arrival.
474	28 May; 02:35	8 hours, 23 minutes	10:58	Shenzhou 18; TSS Wentian	(China) Ye Guangfu; (China) Li Guangsu	Longest Chinese spacewalk to date. Tasks included installing space debris protection devices and conducting inspections of extravehicular equipment and facilities.
475	24 June; 12:46	31 minutes	13:17	Expedition 71; ISS Quest	(United States) Tracy Caldwell Dyson; (United States) Michael Barratt	Dyson and Barratt were intended to venture out and retrieve the SASA Antenna and bring it inside, collect samples from the station's hull to look for signs of microbial growth that could be present on the modules either after launch or exposed to space, and prep the LEE A Wrist Joint Replacement Module for installation on an upcoming spacewalk. However, the spacewalk was terminated shortly after depress due to a water leak in the service and cooling umbilical unit on Dyson's spacesuit.
476	3 July; 08:20	6 hours, 31 minutes	14:51	Shenzhou 18; TSS Wentian	(China) Ye Guangfu; (China) Li Cong	Tasks included installing space debris protection devices and conducting inspections of extravehicular equipment and facilities.
477	12 September; 10:44	32 minutes	11:17	Polaris Dawn; Crew Dragon Resilience	(United States) Jared Isaacman (stand-up only); (United States) Sarah Gillis (stand-up only); (United States) Scott Poteet (did not exit); (United States) Anna Menon (did not exit)	Stand-up EVA to test the capability of Dragon and a new suit designed by SpaceX. Isaacman left the capsule for 7 minutes and 56 seconds followed by Gillis, who left the capsule for 7 minutes and 15 seconds. The other two crew members were exposed to the vacuum of space in the capsule, but did not leave it. First all-private crew spacewalk with commercially developed hardware, procedures, and the EVA suit.
478	17 December; 04:51	9 hours, 6 minutes	13:57	Shenzhou 19; TSS Wentian	(China) Cai Xuzhe (China) Song Lingdong	The two taikonauts completed the longest spacewalk in human history with the assistance of the space station's robotic arms and ground-based scientific personnel, completed tasks such as the installation of space debris protection devices, inspection, and maintenance of external equipment and facilities.
479	19 December; 15:36	7 hours, 17 minutes	22:53	Expedition 72; ISS Poisk	(Russia) Aleksey Ovchinin (Russia) Ivan Vagner	The cosmonauts ventured outside and installed an x-ray telescope on plain 5 of the Zvezda Service Module, jettisoned an ion radiation probe, retrieved Biorisk, TEST, and two exposure experiments on Zvezda and Poisk, and rewired Zvezda and replaced two patch panels which were showing signs of degraded insulation, electronics, and frayed wiring. The task to relocate the ERA control panel was moved to another spacewalk because of time and because of a late start.

== See also ==
- Lists of spacewalks and moonwalks
- List of spacewalks since 2025
- List of spacewalkers
- List of cumulative spacewalk records
