= Experiment module =

Class of space station modules of China space station

Experiment modules
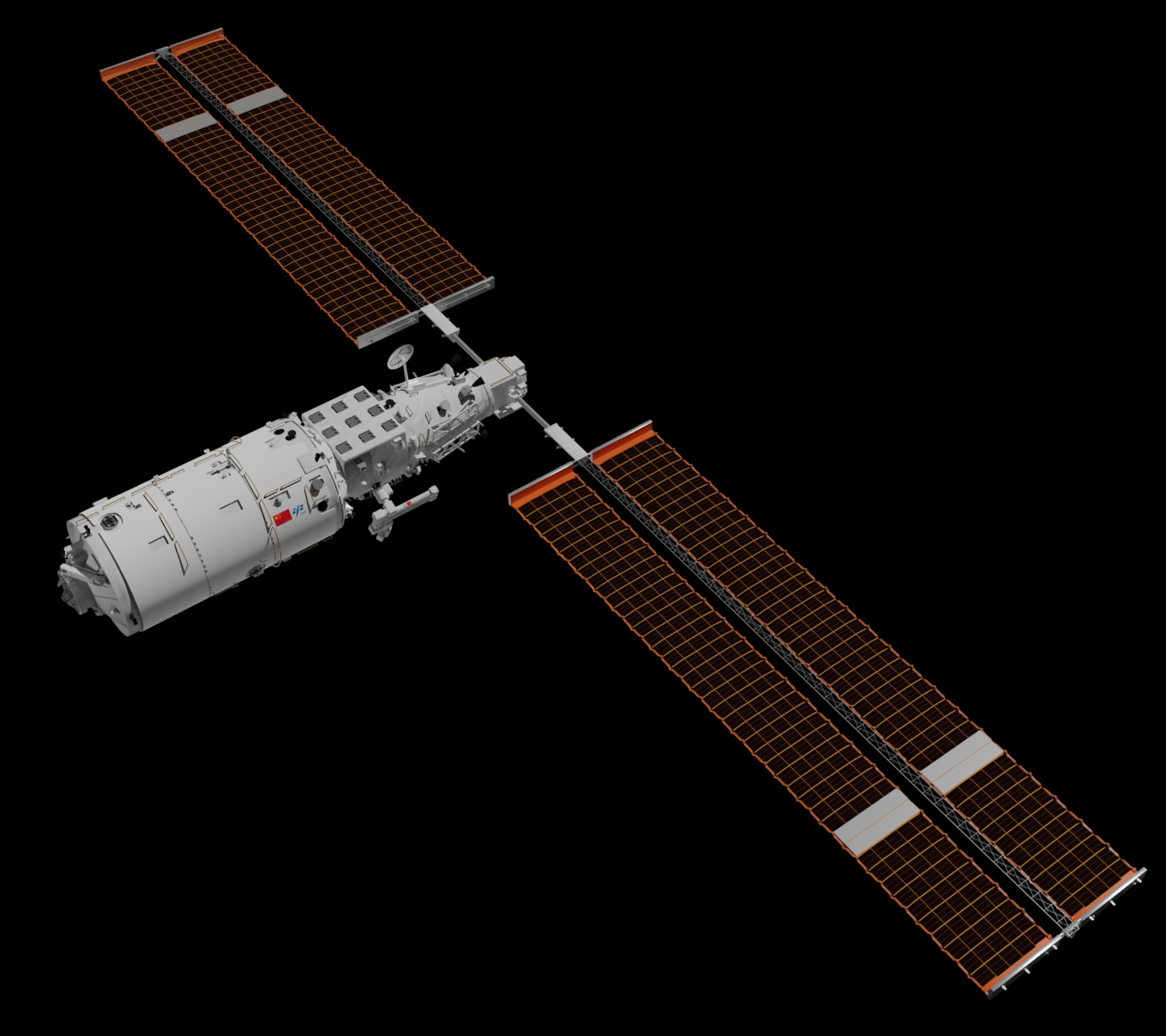
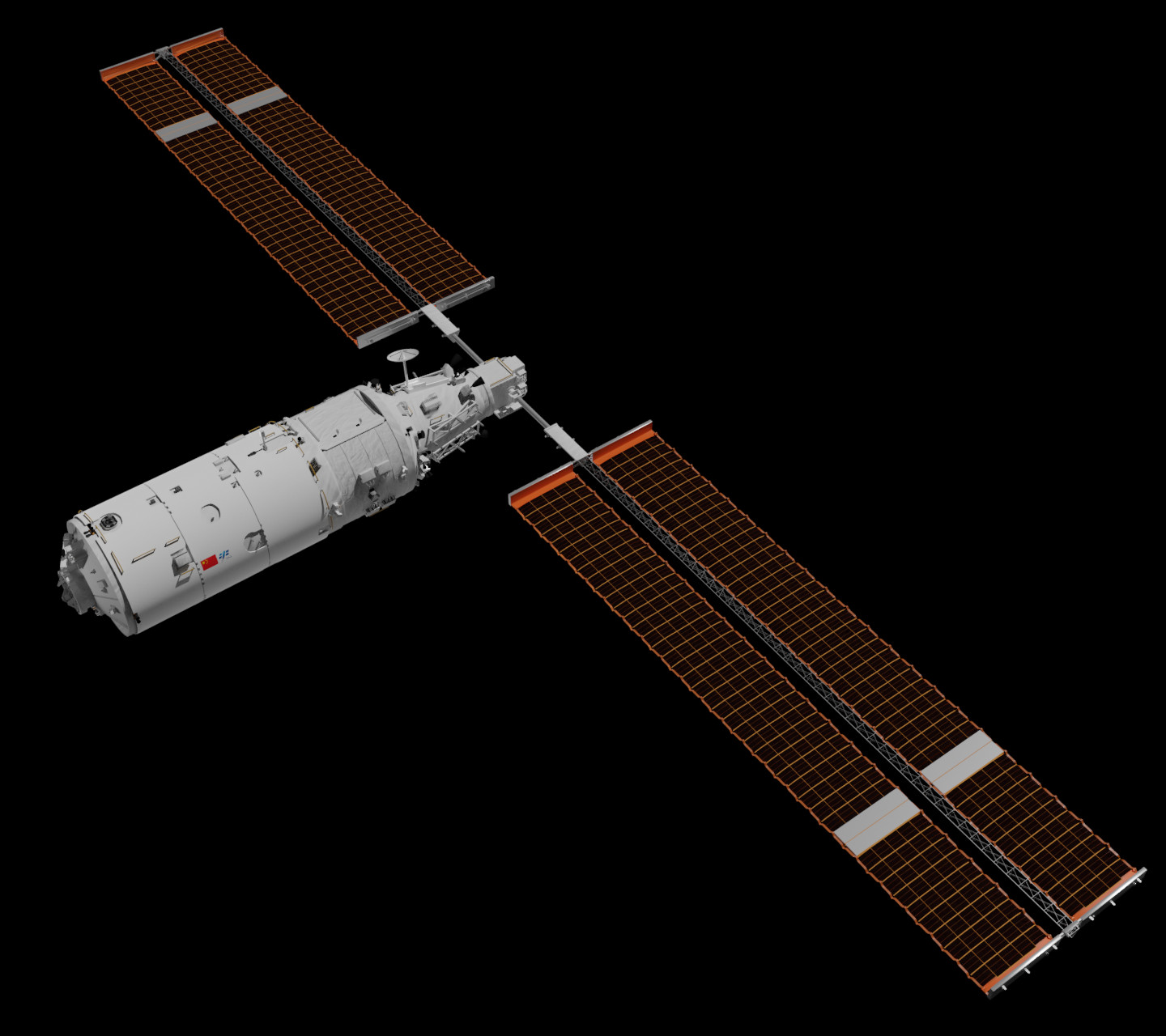
- Renderings of the two experiment modules (from left): Wentian and Mengtian

Module statistics
- Launch date: Wentian: 24 July 2022; Mengtian: 31 October 2022
- Launch vehicle: Long March 5B
- Mass: Dry: 21,650 kg (47,730 lb); At launch: ~23,200 kg (51,100 lb); In orbit: ~22,000 kg (49,000 lb)
- Length: 17.9 m (59 ft)
- Diameter: 4.2 m (14 ft)

The experiment modules (Chinese: 实验舱) are components of the Tiangong space station. The experiment modules complete the third and final stage of Project 921, the China National Space Administration's program to establish a permanent Chinese space station. While China's small uncrewed spacecraft can provide platforms for zero gravity and exposure to space for scientific research, the experiment modules offer a long term environment combined with ready access by human researchers over periods that far exceed the capabilities of Shenzhou spacecraft. Operations are controlled from the Beijing Aerospace Command and Control Center in China.

The first experiment module, Wentian, was launched into orbit on 24 July 2022. The second module, Mengtian, was launched into orbit on 31 October 2022.

== Purpose ==
The first experiment module provides additional navigation avionics, propulsion and orientation control as backup functions for the Tianhe core module. Both experiment modules provide a pressurized environment for researchers to conduct science experiments in freefall or zero gravity which could not be conducted on Earth for more than a few minutes. Experiments can also be placed on the outside of the modules, for exposure to the space environment, cosmic rays, vacuum, and solar winds.

The axial ports of the experiment modules are fitted with rendezvous equipment, and each first docked to the axial port of the core module. A mechanical arm dubbed the Indexing Robotic Arm, somewhat like the Lyappa arm used on the Mir space station, moved Wentian to a starboard-side port and Mengtian to a port-side port of the core module. It is different from Lyappa as it works on a different mechanism. Lyappa arm is needed to control the pitch of the spacecraft and redocking in a different plane. But the Indexing Robotic Arm is used when docking is needed in the same plane. In addition to this arm used for docking relocation, the main robotic arm on Tianhe module can also be used as a backup in place of Indexing Robotic Arm.

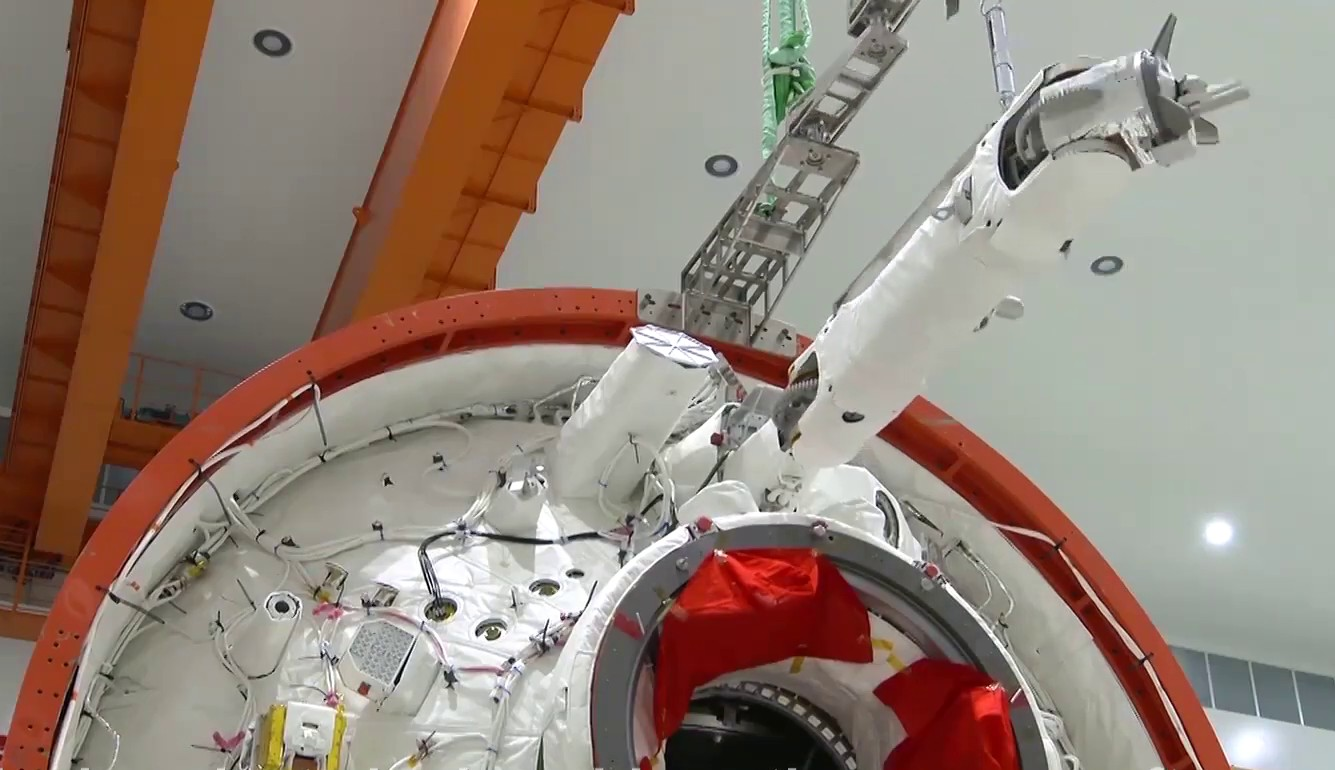
Indexing Robot Arm on Wentian

Wentian was successfully relocated to the starboard port on 30 September 2022 at 04:44 UTC using the indexing robot arm.

In addition to this, Wentian houses a small 5 m (16 ft) long robotic arm that supplements the main robotic arm. It is used for manipulating extravehicular payloads and their positioning accuracy is 5 times better than the main arm. There are standard adapters (silver squares) on the modules to host the payloads. There is also an adapter by which one of these arms can be grappled by the Chinarm it to work a single robotic arm like Orbiter Servicing Arm with Canadarms.

Mengtian also carries a toolbox equipped with a dexterous robotic arm (similar to the Lyappa arm used on the Mir space station) installed to assist in cargo transfer and payload release, and can be used to deploy external payloads.

Electrical power is provided by two steerable solar power arrays, which use photovoltaic cells to convert sunlight into electricity. Energy is stored to power the station when it passes into the Earth's shadow. Resupply ships will replenish fuel for experiment module 1 for station-keeping, to counter the effects of atmospheric drag.

== Launch ==
Both modules were launched in 2022 on Long March 5B launch vehicles from Wenchang Satellite Launch Center. Wentian was launched on 24 July 2022, while Mengtian was launched on 31 October 2022. They were inserted into a low Earth orbit with an average altitude of 393 km (244 mi) at an orbital inclination of 42 degrees, centered in the Earth's thermosphere.

== See also ==
- Tianhe core module
