= Wentian experiment module =

Module of the Tiangong space station

Wentian
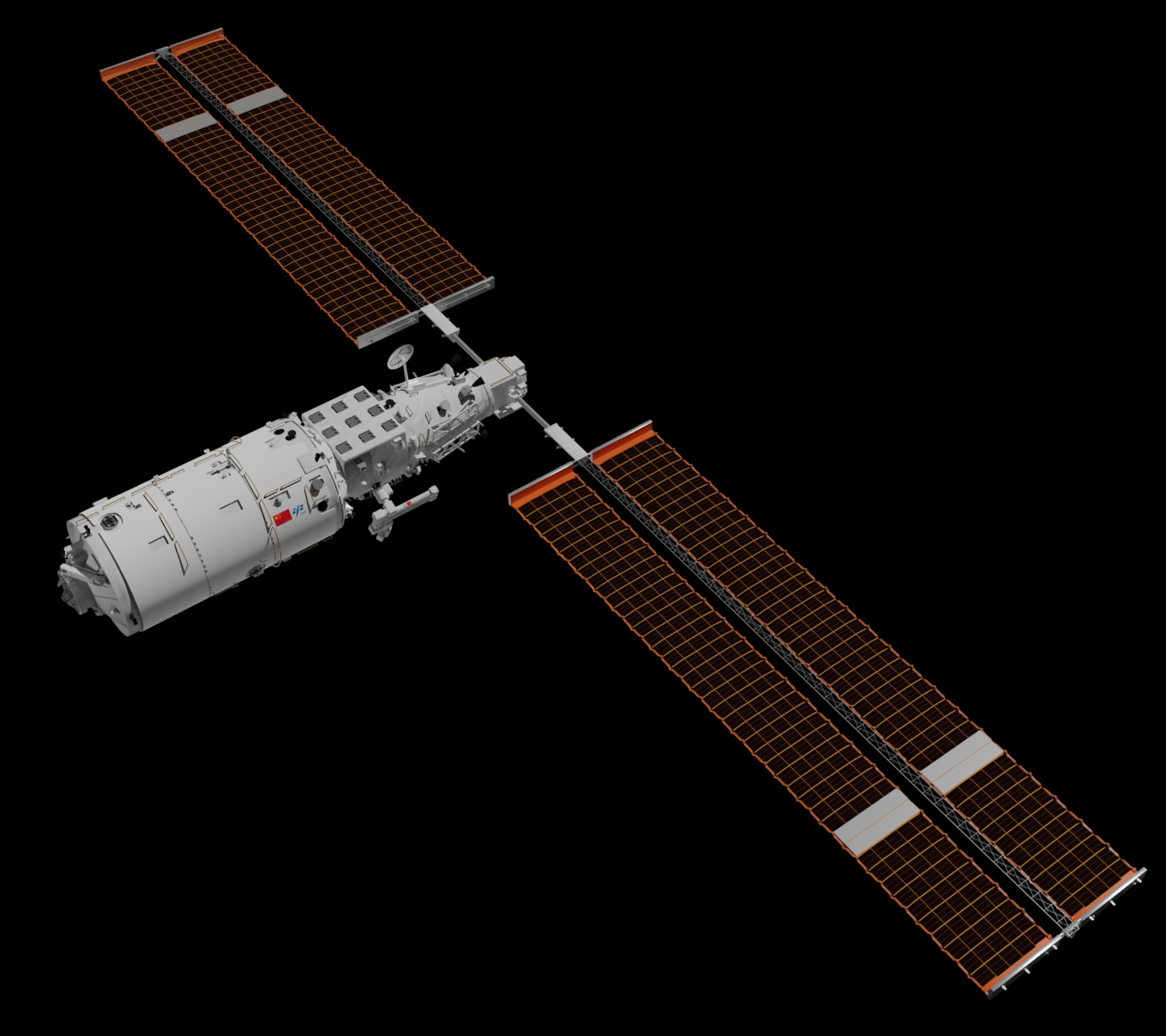
- Rendering of Wentian experiment module

Module statistics
- COSPAR ID: 2022-085A
- Part of: Tiangong space station
- Launch date: 24 July 2022, 06:22:32 UTC (14:22:32 CST)
- Launch vehicle: Long March 5B (5B-Y3)
- Mass: Dry: 21,650 kg (47,730 lb); At launch: ~23,200 kg (51,100 lb); In orbit: ~22,000 kg (49,000 lb)
- Length: 17.9 m (59 ft)
- Diameter: 4.2 m (14 ft)
- Pressurised volume: 118 m^{3} (4,200 cu ft); Habitable: 39 m^{3} (1,400 cu ft)

Docking with Tiangong space station
- Docking port: Tianhe forward
- Docking date: 24 July 2022, 19:13 UTC
- Undocking date: 30 September 2022, ~03:44 UTC
- Time docked: 67 days, 8 hours, 31 minutes

Berthing at Tiangong space station (relocation)
- Berthing port: Tianhe starboard
- Berthing date: 30 September 2022, 04:44 UTC
- Time berthed: 4 years, 1 month
- Insignia

Configuration
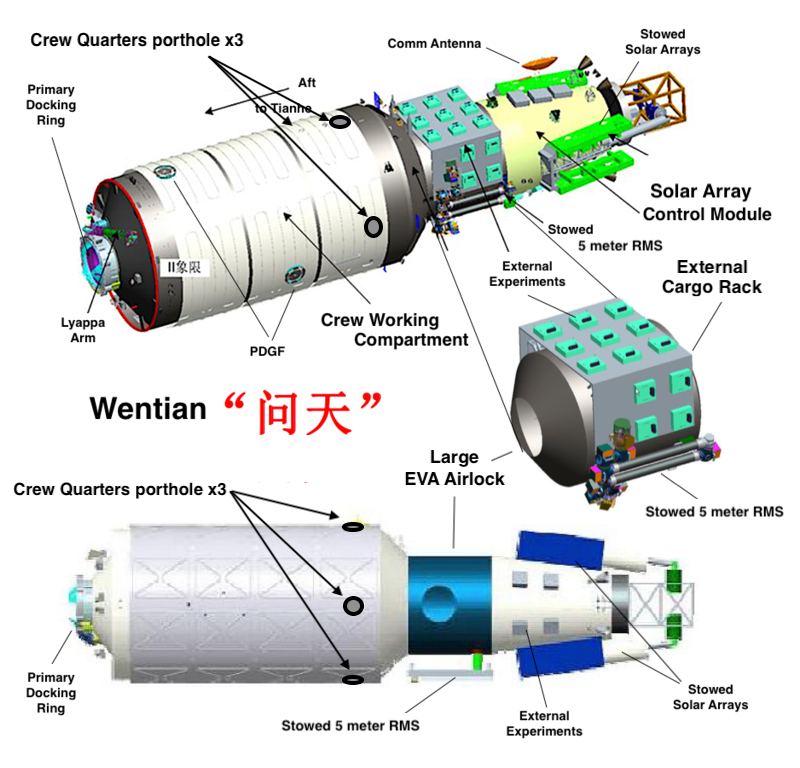
- Diagram of the Wentian module

The Wentian experiment module (simplified Chinese: 问天实验舱; traditional Chinese: 問天實驗艙; pinyin: Wèn tiān shíyàn cāng; lit. 'Quest for the Heavens experiment module'), is a major component of the Tiangong space station. It is the first of the station’s Experiment Modules and the first module added to the Tianhe core module.

Wentian was launched on 24 July 2022 from the Wenchang Spacecraft Launch Site and docked with Tianhe later that day. The crew of Shenzhou 14 entered the module for the first time a few hours later. On 30 September 2022, the module was relocated to the starboard port by the station’s indexing robot arm to prepare for the arrival of the Mengtian.

== Characteristics ==
The Wentian experiment module provides additional navigation avionics, propulsion and orientation control as backup functions for the Tianhe Core Module. It also provides a pressurized environment for researchers to conduct science experiments in freefall or zero gravity which could not be conducted on Earth for more than a few minutes. Experiments can also be placed on the outside of the modules, for exposure to the space environment, cosmic rays, vacuum, and the solar wind.

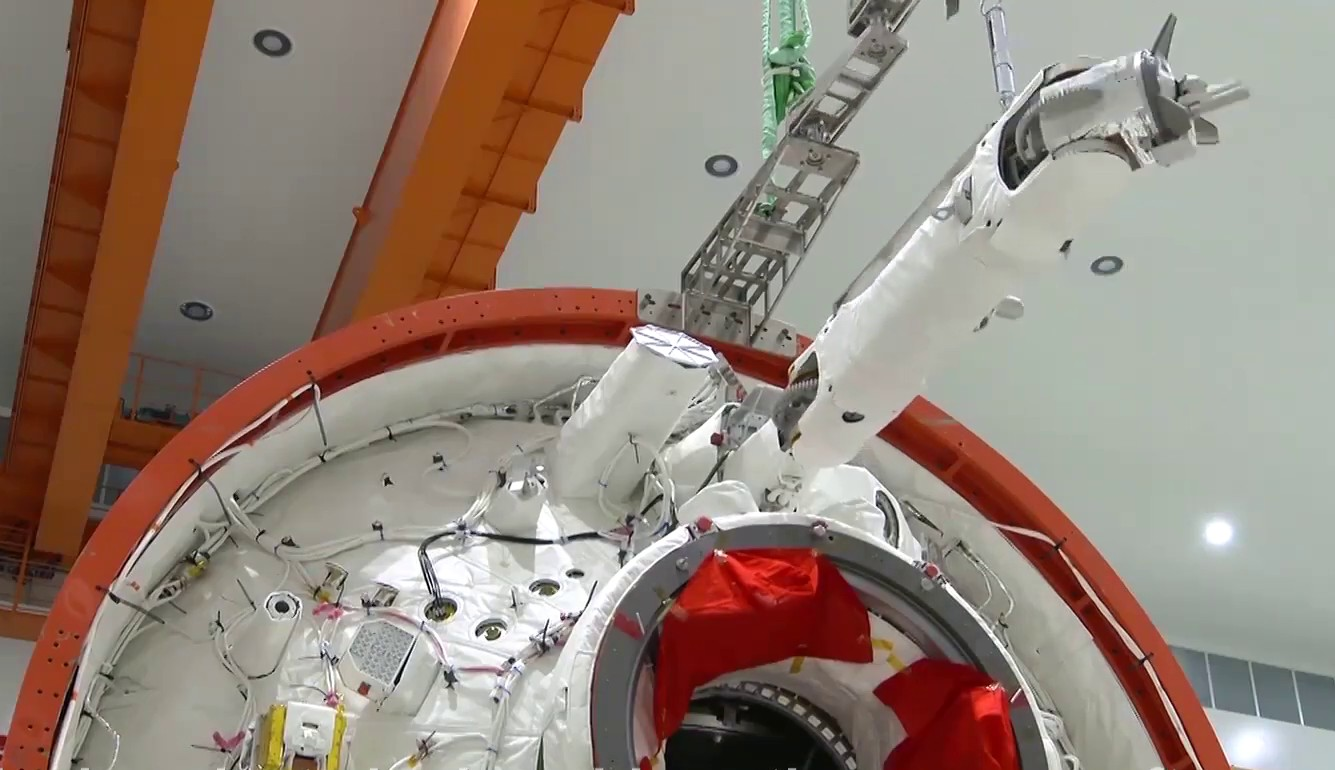
Indexing robotic arm

The forward docking port of Wentian is fitted with rendezvous equipment and first docked to the forward port of Tianhe. A mechanical arm called the "indexing robotic arm", and similar in function to the Lyappa arm used on the Mir space station moved the module to a starboard port of the TCM on 30 September 2022. It is different from the Lyappa as it works on a different mechanism. Mir's Lyappa arm is needed to control the pitch of the spacecraft and redocking in a different plane, but the Wentian indexing robot arm is used when docking is needed in the same plane. In addition to this arm used for docking relocation, the main robotic arm on Tianhe module, could also had been used as a backup of the indexing robot arm.

In addition to this, it also carried a small 5 m (16 ft) long robotic arm called the Experiment Module Manipulator (EMM) which can complement the Core Module Manipulator (CMM). It is used for manipulating extravehicular payloads and assisting EVAs. Its positioning accuracy is 5 times better than the CMM. Wentian in total has 22 standard adaptors (silver squares) to host the payloads. Wentian's arm is primarily used to transfer experiments and other hardware outside the station. A dual-arm connector is installed on the CMM, providing it the capability to link with the EMM, extending its reach and weight-carrying limits.

Electrical power is provided by two steerable solar power arrays, which use photovoltaic cells to convert sunlight into electricity. With a wingspan of over 55 m (180 ft), each array has an energy collection area of 110 m^{2} (1184 square ft). The energy is then stored to power the station when it passes into the Earth's shadow. Resupply ships will replenish fuel for experiment module 1 for station-keeping, to counter the effects of atmospheric drag.

== Aftermath ==
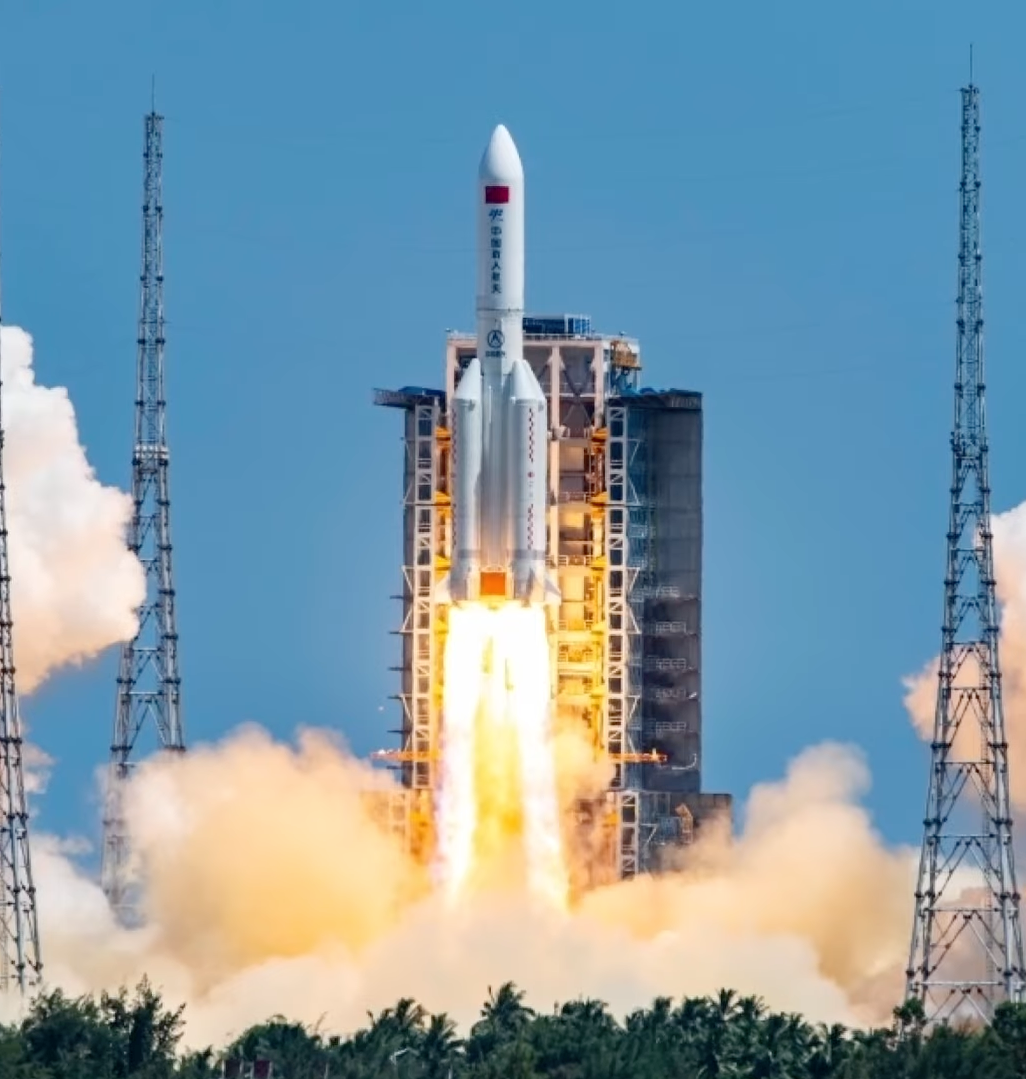
Launch of Wentian

After launch, the Wentian module was inserted into a low Earth orbit with an average altitude of 393 km (244 mi) at an orbital inclination of 42 degrees, centered in the Earth's thermosphere. It successfully docked with the Tianhe core module nearly thirteen hours after launch.

During the re-entry phase of the Long March rocket's main core stage, NASA Administrator Bill Nelson voiced criticism for allowing the stage to return to the Earth in an uncontrolled re-entry. The stage eventually made re-entry and splashed down over the Pacific Ocean on 30 July 2022, with the bulk of it burning up on re-entry and no known pieces that survived re-entry causing damage.

== Assembly ==
The Shenzhou 14 mission to the space station assisted with setting up the Wentian module in orbit.

== Airlock ==
Wentian has an airlock primarily used for conducting spacewalks. It features more space than the spherical docking hub on Tianhe, which had been used for prior spacewalks. On 1 September 2022 (10:26 UTC) Chen Dong and Liu Yang conducted the first spacewalk from the Wentian airlock. The Wentian airlock is now the primary choice for hosting spacewalks.

== Gallery ==
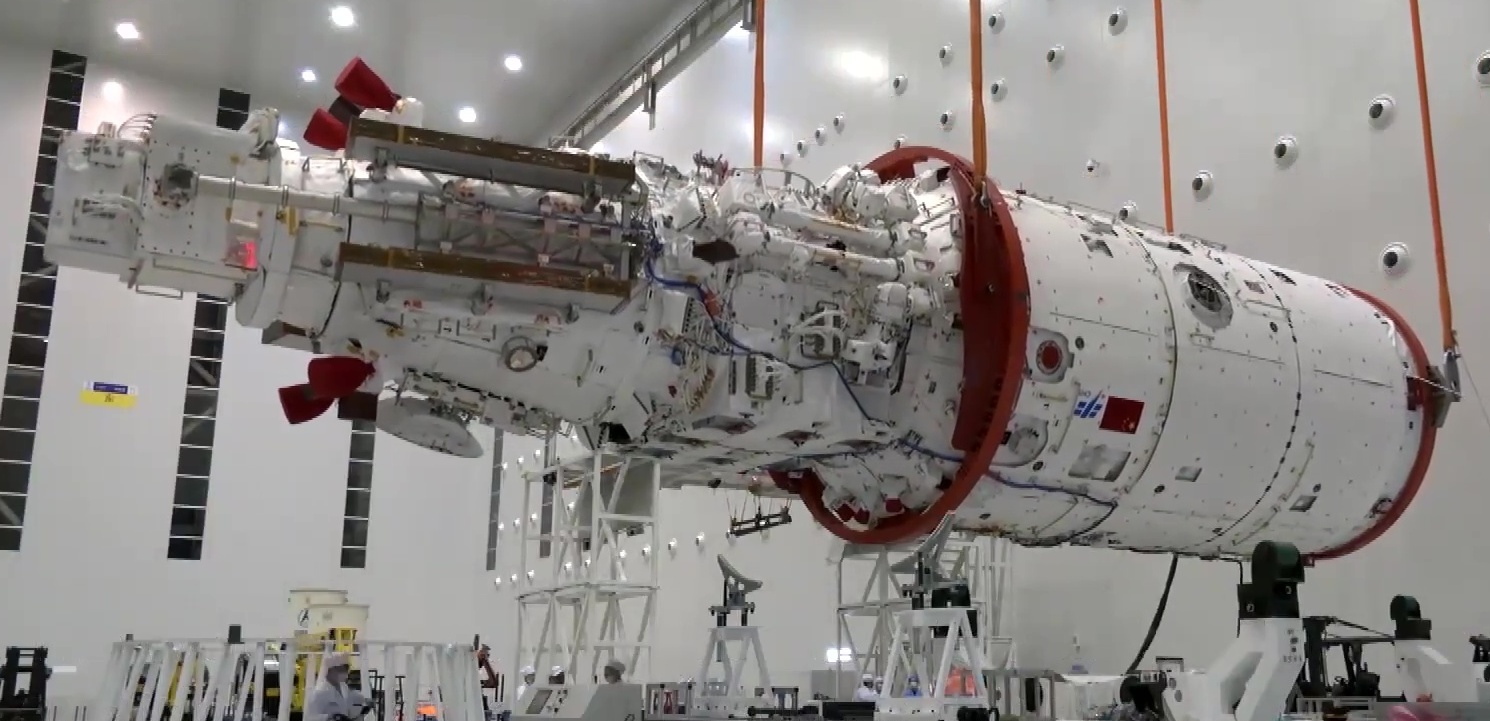
Wentian lab module prior to launch

The module relocation process with rotation arm equipped by the Wentian lab cabin module

== See also ==
- Tianhe core module
- Mengtian experiment module
- Xuntian space station survey telescope
