= Quest Joint Airlock =

Primary airlock for the International Space Station

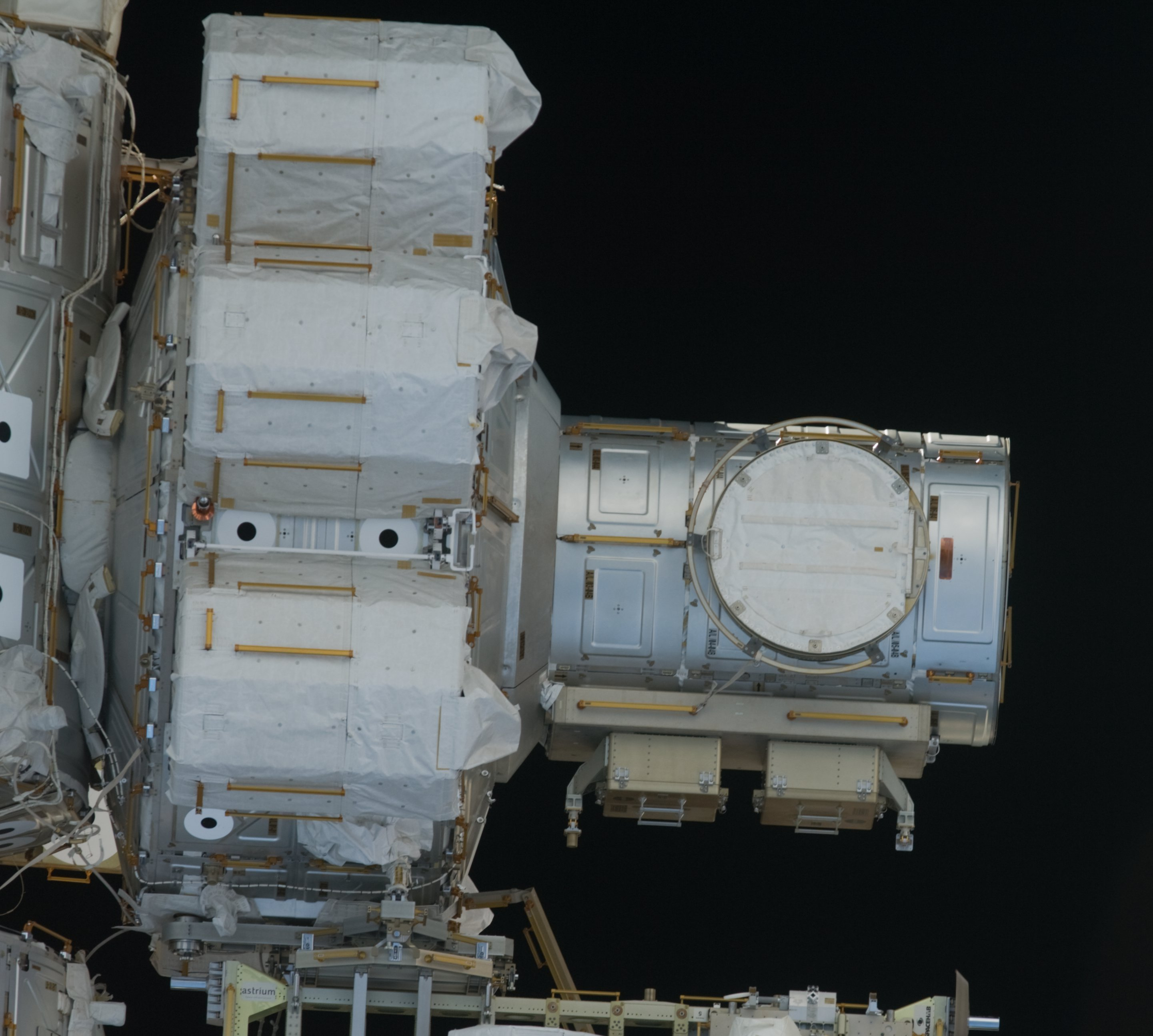
- Quest Joint Airlock Module. Crew lock with EVA hatch on right, and equipment lock with three attached gas tanks on left

Module statistics
- Part of: International Space Station
- Launch date: July 12, 2001, 09:04 UTC
- Launch vehicle: Space Shuttle Atlantis
- Berthed: July 15, 2001, 07:40 UTC (Unity starboard)
- Mass: 6,064 kg (13,369 lb)
- Length: 5.5 m (18 ft)
- Diameter: 4 m (13 ft)
- Pressurized volume: 34 m^{3} (1,200 cu ft)

The Quest Joint Airlock is the primary airlock for the International Space Station. Quest was designed to host spacewalks with both Extravehicular Mobility Unit (EMU) spacesuits and Orlan space suits. The airlock was launched on STS-104 on July 14, 2001.

It was attached to the starboard CBM of the Unity during STS-104. The four external HP tanks were installed in pairs on two occasions.

Before Quest was attached, Russian spacewalks using Orlan suits could only be done from the Zvezda service module, and American spacewalks using EMUs were only possible when a Space Shuttle was docked, allowing the astronauts to use the Shuttle's airlock, located in its payload bay. The arrival of Pirs docking compartment on September 16, 2001, provided another airlock from which Orlan spacewalks can be conducted.

== Requirements ==
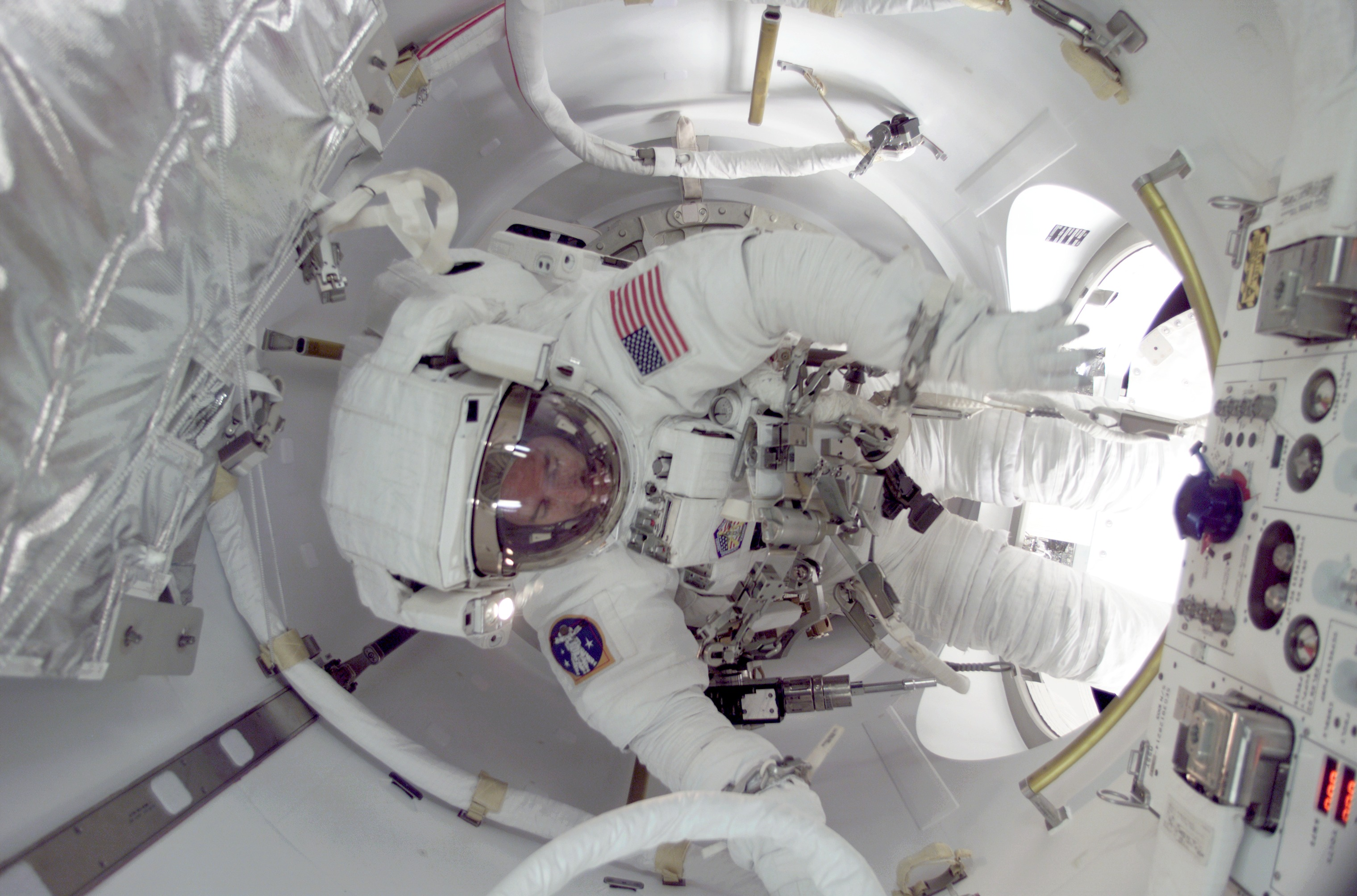
James F. Reilly during preparation for the first space walk utilizing the Quest Airlock in July 2001

Quest was necessary because American suits (EMUs) will not fit through a Russian airlock hatch and have different components, fittings, and connections.

It is sized to allow EVAs with two crew.

== Early use ==
EMU EVAs were conducted from the ISS Joint Airlock in July 2001, February 2002, April 2002, and June 2002.

== Design ==
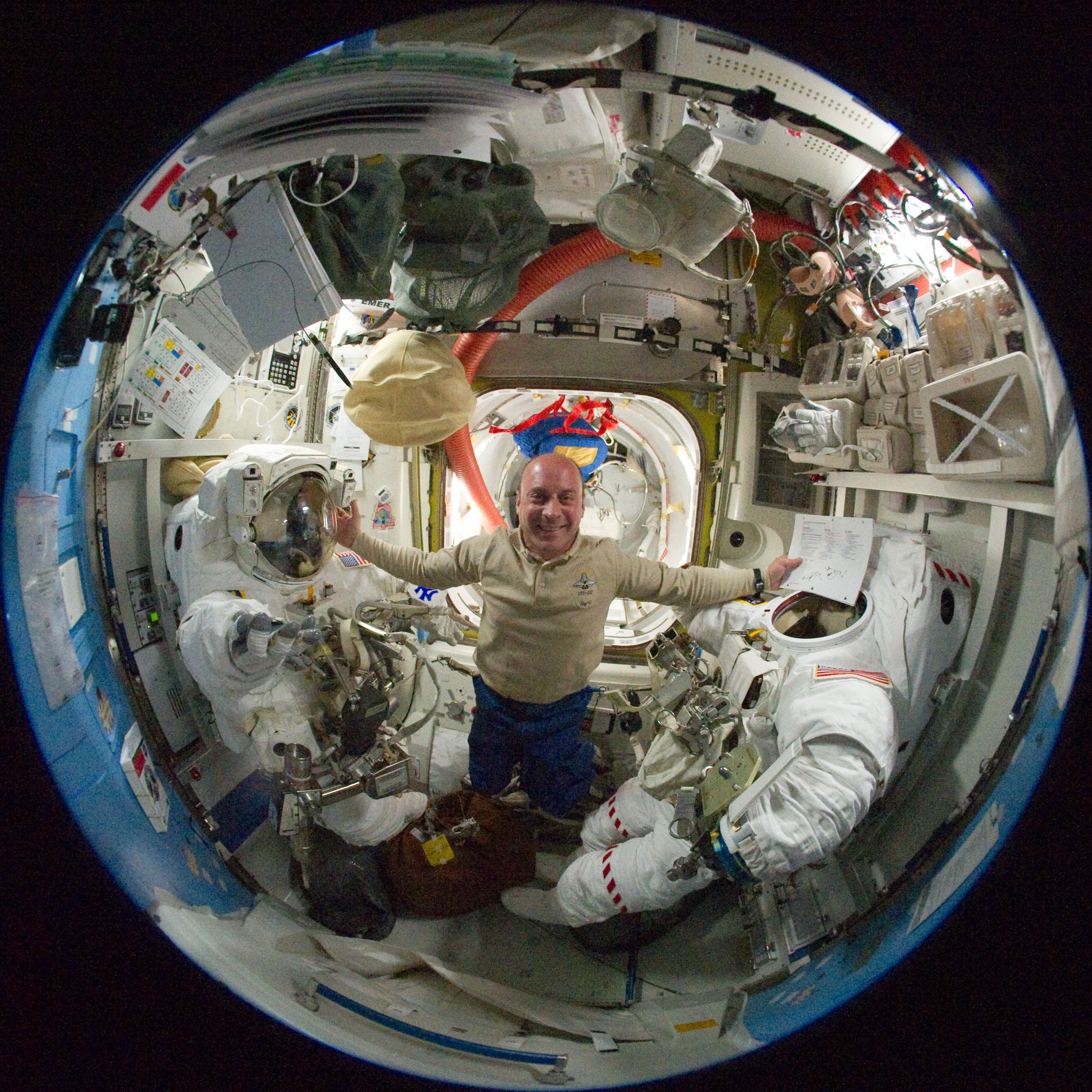
Reisman inside Quest

The Quest Airlock consists of two segments, the "Equipment lock" that stores spacesuits and equipment, and the "Crew Lock" from which astronauts can exit into space. It was derived from the Space Shuttle airlock, although it was significantly modified to waste less atmospheric gas when used. It has mountings for four high-pressure gas tanks, two containing oxygen and two containing nitrogen, which provides for atmospheric replenishment to the American side of the space station, most specifically for the gas lost after a hatch opening during a space walk.

=== Equipment lock segment ===
The larger equipment lock has storage space for EMU suits and equipment to check and maintain the EMUs.

There is a Battery Charging Assembly, a Battery Stowage Assembly, a Fluid Pumping Unit (FPU) (to refill the EMU water tanks after each EVA), and much else.

=== Crew lock segment ===
The hatch to space (EV hatch) has an inward opening airtight hard hatch, and an outwardly hinged thermal cover. The inner airtight hatch gets stowed at the end of the crew lock to allow ingress and egress.

In the crew lock is the Umbilical Interface Assembly, able to support two US suits, or two Orlan-M suits, or one of each.

== Camp-out procedure ==
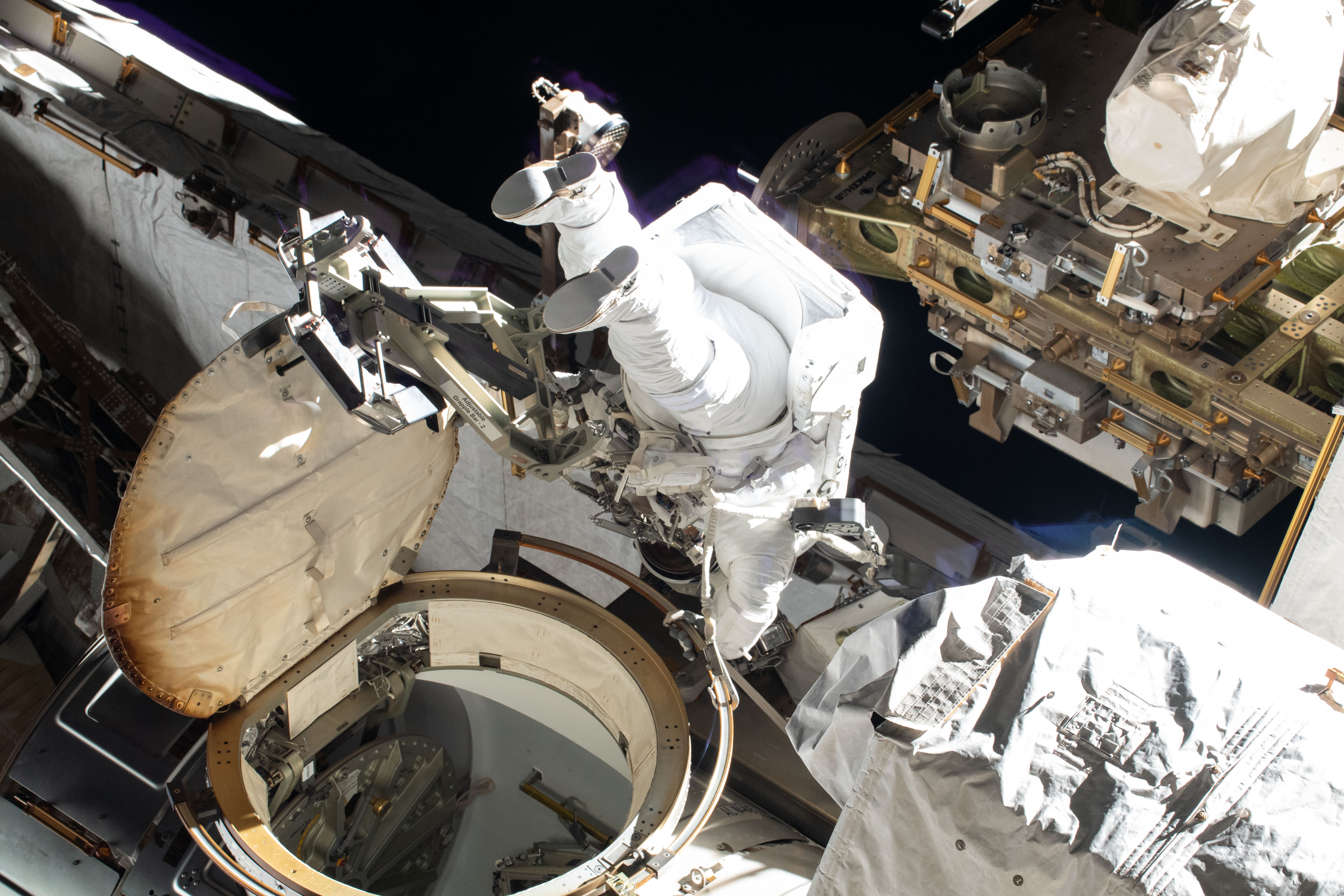
Christina Koch exits the Quest airlock

Quest provides an environment where astronauts can "camp out" before a spacewalk in a reduced-nitrogen atmosphere to purge nitrogen from their bloodstream and avoid decompression sickness in the low-pressure (4.3 psi, 30 kPa) pure-oxygen atmosphere of the spacesuit. In April 2006, Expedition 12 Commander Bill McArthur and Expedition 13 flight engineer Jeffrey Williams tested this new method of preparing for spacewalks by spending the night in the Quest Airlock. In the chamber, the pressure was reduced from the normal 14.7 to 10.2 psi (101 to 70 kPa). Four hours into the Expedition 13 crew's sleep period, an error tone prompted mission controllers to cut short the activity, but the test was still deemed a success. American spacewalk activities thereafter have employed the "camp-out" pre-breathing technique. The previous method of preparing for spacewalks involved breathing pure oxygen for several hours prior to an EVA to purge the body of nitrogen.

More recently astronauts have been using the In-Suit Light Exercise protocol rather than camp-out to prevent decompression sickness.

== High-pressure gas tanks ==
Two oxygen and two nitrogen high-pressure gas tanks are attached externally to the equipment lock segment. These tanks (known as the High Pressure Gas Assembly.) provide a replenishable source of gas to the atmosphere control and supply system and 900 psi (6.2 MPa) oxygen for recharging the space suits (EMUs).

Recharging the high-pressure tanks was accomplished by the Space Shuttle fleet until its retirement. When an orbiter was docked to the station's Pressurized Mating Adapters (PMA-2 or PMA-3), oxygen was routed through pressure lines from the PMAs to the Quest Airlock. The pumping of the oxygen from the docked spacecraft tanks into Quest's high-pressure tank was accomplished by the Oxygen Recharge Compressor Assembly (ORCA).

After the retirement of the Space Shuttle fleet, the Nitrogen Oxygen Recharge System (NORS) and spacecraft from the Commercial Crew Development program will take over this task.

== Construction ==
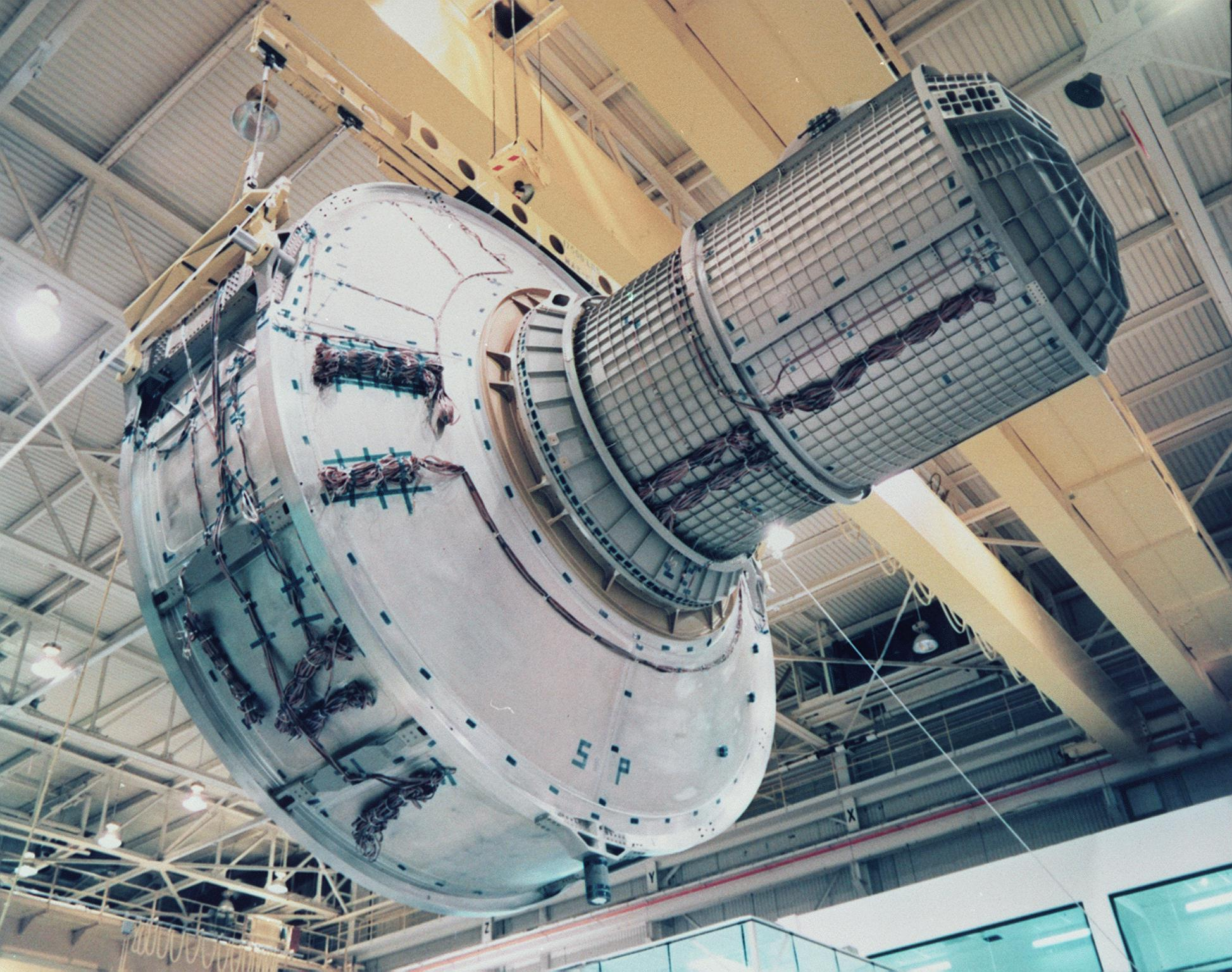
Quest airlock at the Marshall Space Flight Center

This module was manufactured by Boeing, under contract by NASA, at the Marshall Space Flight Center in 2000. It is made from aluminum and steel alloys.

The design for the crew airlock segment was derived from that of the Space Shuttle's external airlock.

== Airlock specifications ==
- Material: aluminium and steel
- Length: 5.5 meters (18 ft)
- Diameter: 4 meters (13 ft)
- Mass: 6,064 kilograms (13,369 lb)
- Volume: 34 cubic meters (1,200 cu ft)
- Cost: $164 million, including tanks
