= Lanyue =

China crewed lunar surface lander

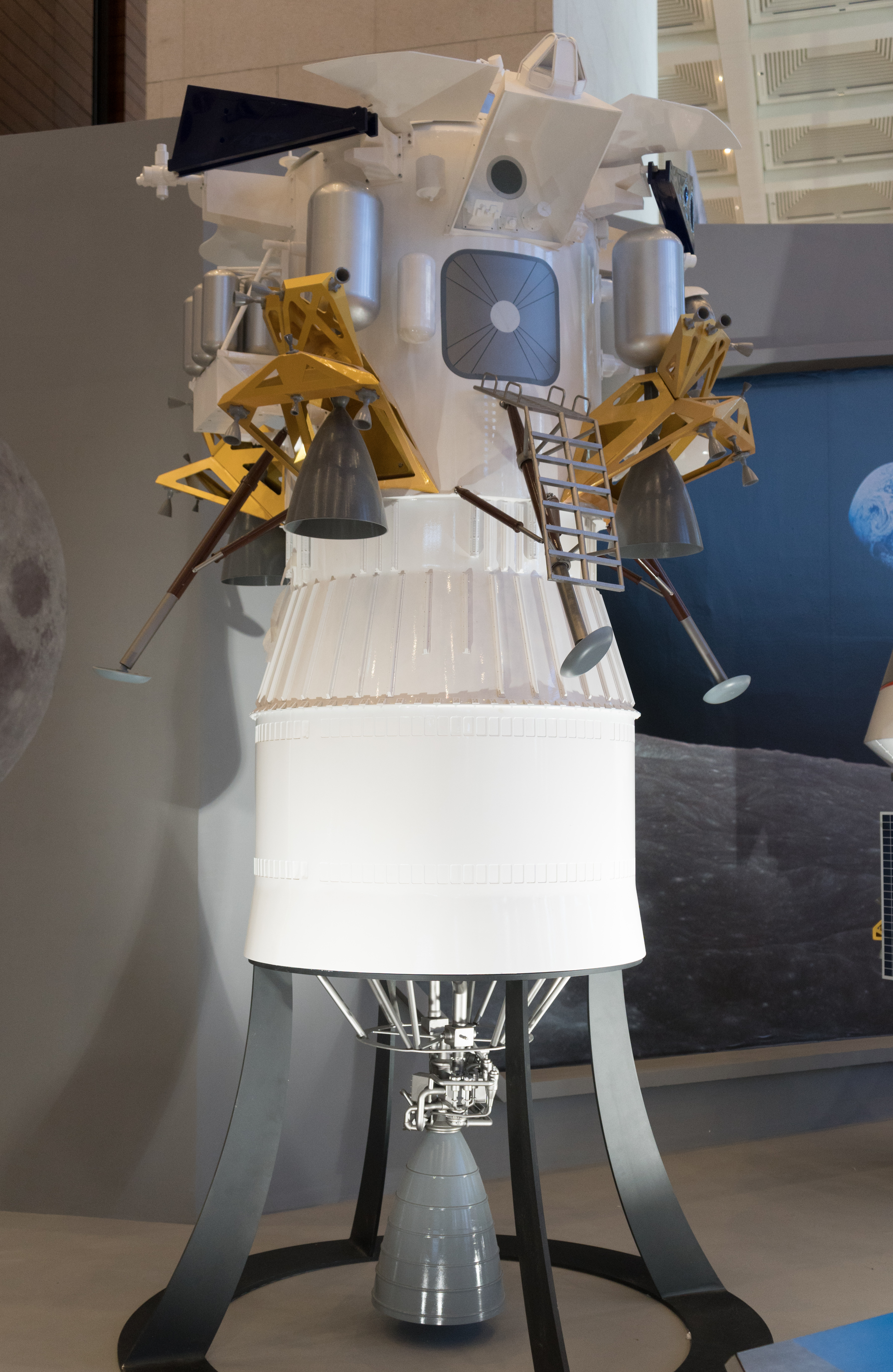
- Model of planned Lanyue lunar lander (attached to its propulsion stage) in 2023
- Manufacturer: China Academy of Space Technology
- Country of origin: China
- Operator: China Manned Space Agency
- Applications: Crewed lunar landing as part of Chinese Lunar Exploration Program

Specifications
- Spacecraft type: Crewed
- Launch mass: ≈26,000 kg (57,000 lb) with propulsion stage
- Crew capacity: 2
- Power: Solar
- Equipment: Crewed lunar rover
- Regime: Low Earth orbit, lunar transfer orbit, lunar orbit, lunar surface

Production
- Status: Under development

The Lanyue (Chinese: 揽月; pinyin: lǎn yuè; lit. 'embracing the Moon'), known during early development as the China crewed lunar surface lander, (Note: 中国载人月面着陆器) is a spacecraft under development by the China Academy of Space Technology (CAST) for China's crewed lunar missions.

Astronauts will travel to low lunar orbit aboard the Mengzhou spacecraft, where they will dock with a waiting Lanyue, launched autonomously by a separate Long March 10 rocket. Two astronauts then will transfer to the empty lander and proceed to attempt a landing on the lunar surface; the lander will return the astronauts to low lunar orbit after a period of surface operations. The first lunar landing attempt is planned for before 2030.

Lanyue consists of a propulsion stage and a landing and ascent stage; unlike the Apollo Lunar Module, Lanyue will jettison its propulsion stage prior to landing.

There also are plans to develop the Lanyue lunar lander into a "family of vehicles", possibly including lunar habitation and mobile research modules.

== Nomenclature ==
The spacecraft's name, Lanyue (lit. 'embracing the Moon'), derives from a line in Mao Zedong's 1965 poem "Climbing Jinggang Mountain", in which embracing the Moon is described as an aspiration. It's companion crewed spacecraft's name, Mengzhou (梦舟; 'dream vessel') references the goal of lunar exploration and has been associated with Xi Jinping's Chinese Dream concept. Commentators have described the pairing of references to Xi Jinping and Mao Zedong in the spacecraft names as symbolically linking the two leaders. The names were announced in February 2024 following a public naming competition.

== Overview ==
Since at least August 2021, Western news media has reported that China's main spacecraft contractor was working on a human-rated landing system for lunar missions. On 12 July 2023, at the 9th China (International) Commercial Aerospace Forum in Wuhan, Hubei province, Zhang Hailian, a deputy chief designer with the CMSA, publicly introduced a preliminary plan to land two astronauts on the Moon by the year 2030. Under this plan, the astronauts will conduct scientific work upon landing on the Moon, including the collection of lunar rock and regolith samples. After a short stay on the lunar surface, they will carry the collected samples back into lunar orbit in their spacecraft and subsequently, to Earth.

The preliminary plan describes a 'landing segment' that consists of a new lunar-module attached to a propulsion-module which together are to be launched autonomously into a trans-lunar injection (TLI) orbit by the under-development Long March 10 rocket. The twin-module arrangement is somewhat analogous to the lander-orbiter architecture of the 2020 Chang'e 5 and the 2024 Chang'e 6 robotic lunar sample-return missions; however, unlike the orbiters for the robotic missions, the propulsion module for the overall spacecraft will descend from lunar orbit together with the crewed lunar module rather than remaining in lunar orbit. (The propulsion module will undergo a controlled impact landing on the Moon after it separates from the crewed lunar module during the final stages of the descent, while the crewed module itself makes a powered soft landing).

== Development history ==
On 24 April 2024, Lin Xiqiang, deputy director of China Manned Space Agency (CMSA), stated that the initial development of various products for China's lunar missions, including the Lanyue lander, is complete; according to Lin, mechanical and thermal articles for the lander and other mission segments have been constructed and the requisite rocket engines are undergoing hot fire tests. Lin further elaborated that prototype production and tests are in full swing and that the crewed lunar exploration launch site is currently under construction near the existing coastal Wenchang spaceport in Hainan province.

On 29 October 2024, CMSA announced that a separation test for the two modules of the landing system (presumably the lander and its propulsion stage) had been carried out.

On 7 August 2025, CMSA announced that integrated landing and ascent tests have been successfully carried out using a lunar module test article at a facility located in Huailai County in Hebei Province. These tests verified the craft's landing and takeoff systems, control systems, lunar contact shutdown procedures, and the compatibility of interfaces between subsystems, including guidance, navigation and control as well as the propulsion system. CMSA also indicated that mechanical tests simulating the impact of launch on the landing stack have been carried out. Tests to verify the craft's response to the thermal environment of cislunar space have also been carried out.

On 31 October 2026, during the seventh Manned Space Symposium held in Beijing, Wang Xiang, deputy chief designer of China's human spaceflight program, and chief designer of the China Lunar Exploration Program (CLEP), revealed that the roadmap for China's first crewed lunar landing involves three steps. First, a stand-alone uncrewed Lanyue lander will launch on a tri-core Long March 10 rocket and attempt an autonomous landing on the Moon before ascending back into lunar orbit. If the first step proves successful, then two Long March 10 rockets will attempt a full uncrewed dress rehearsal of the landing architecture by launching an uncrewed Mengzhou spacecraft and an uncrewed Lanyue lander separately, have them autonomously dock in lunar orbit, attempt an uncrewed Lanyue lunar landing followed by an ascent and then by another autonomous docking with the Mengzhou spacecraft, before safely returning the Mengzhou crew capsule back to Earth. Only after this full-dress rehearsal mission has been successfully accomplished will China attempt its first crewed lunar landing mission. China is aiming to accomplish all three developmental steps prior to the year 2030.

== Attributes ==
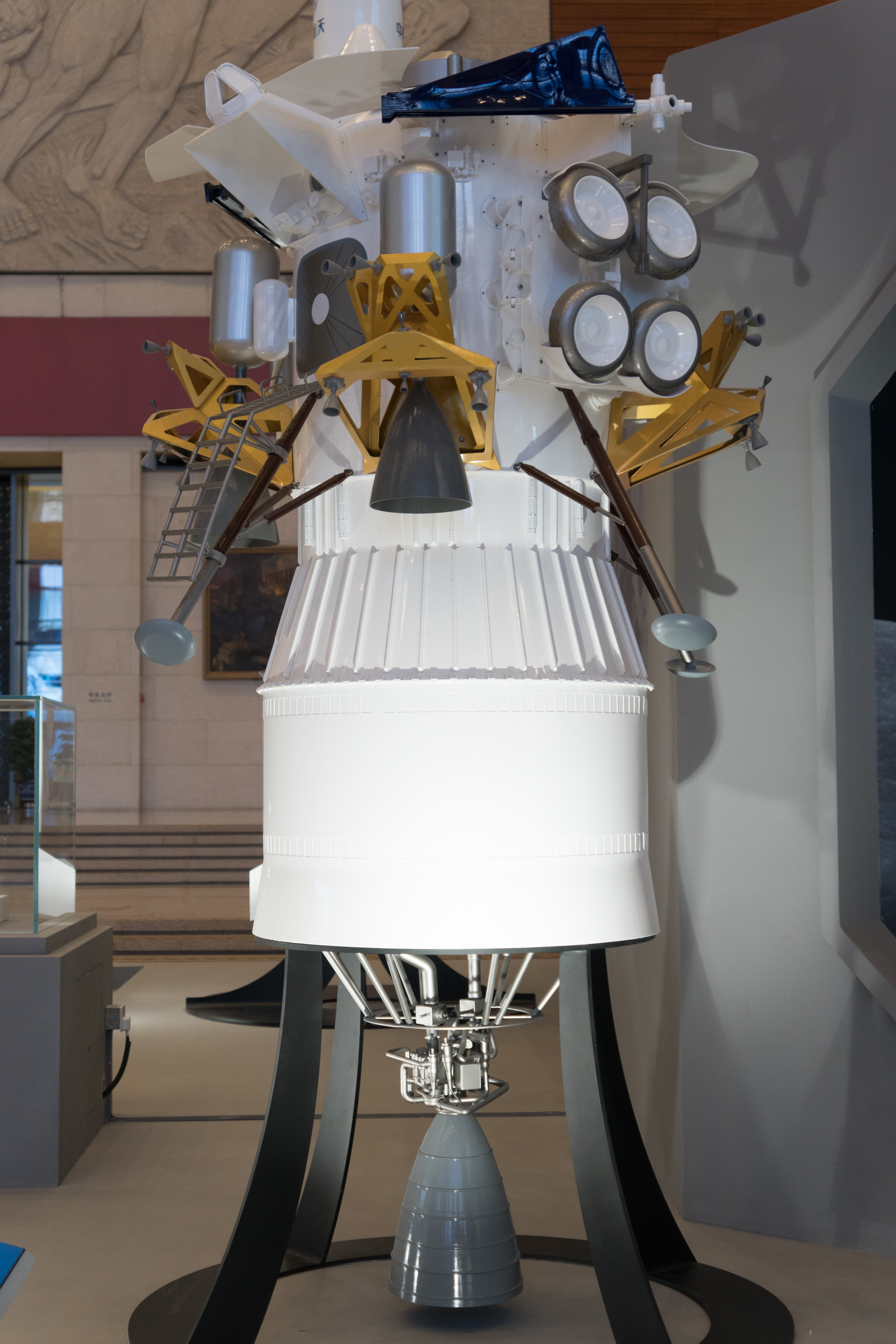
A model of the Lanyue in 2023

A model of the under-development crew-capable lunar lander was unveiled at an exhibition to mark three decades of China's human spaceflight program on 24 February 2023 at the National Museum of China in Beijing.

The physical model of the under-development lunar module, when considered together with the presentation by Zhang Hailian on 12 July 2023, suggests the future spacecraft will have the following components: four 7500-newton main engines, numerous attitude-control thrusters for precise maneuvering, a stowed lunar rover capable of carrying two astronauts, docking mechanisms (for docking with the Mengzhou spacecraft), a crew hatch (for EVAs), a ladder attached to one of the landing legs, two solar arrays, various antennaes and sensors.

The estimated mass of the fully-fuelled spacecraft (lunar-module plus propulsion-module) is approximately 26,000 kg (57,000 lb). According to a statement in August 2025 by Wang Xiaolei of the Fifth Academy of China Aerospace Science and Technology Corporation, the Lanyue lunar module will be capable of automatic detection of lunar surface hazards and will autonomously maneuver to avoid said obstacles: "...the lander (can) automatically identify and avoid obstacles, autonomously selecting a suitable landing site for a safe touchdown."

=== Engines ===
The lunar module is the crew-carrying segment of the spacecraft; this segment of the spacecraft will soft-land on the lunar surface with two crew members and then carry them back into lunar orbit at the conclusion of the surface portion of the mission.

According to a March 2026 paper in the "[Journal] Chinese Space Science and Technology", the lunar module's main propulsion system consists of four YF-36 engines burning monomethylhydrazine and nitrogen tetroxide (N2O4). The loaded propellant mass at the start of the spacecraft's mission is about 6,000 kg. The propellant will be stored in two separate chambers of a single common-bulkhead style propellant tank while the tank itself is located beneath the crew cabin; the fuel and oxidizer chambers are pressurized using helium gas stored within two separate tanks fixed to the sides of the spacecraft. The propellant tank will be subject to some level of heat generated by the YF-36 engines due to the tank's location; this problem is addressed via the addition of both active and passive cooling material near the tank as well as by planned throttling of the engines' thrust level.

In the abstract to the above-cited paper, the researchers stated that "...pressure difference stability control of common bottom tanks under large and small flow rates and thrust consistency control of four variable-thrust engines have been solved. The pressure difference of the common bottom tank can be controlled within a small range of 0 to 0.3MPa, and the thrust deviation of the four variable-thrust engines is controlled within 100N."

Scenarios involving the failure of one of the YF-36 engines on the lunar module were also investigated by researchers. In the event of a single engine failure, symmetrical spacecraft thrust can be maintained by shutting down an additional engine diagonally across from the failed unit, and the lunar module then may execute an abort-to-orbit, a delayed-landing, or a lengthened ascent-flight, depending on its flight state.

=== Guidance, navigation, and control ===
The lunar module's guidance, navigation, and control (GNC) system is responsible for assisting the lander and the astronauts to safely land on the lunar surface and subsequently to return to the correct low lunar orbit. The lander's GNC system includes the following instruments and subsystems: inertial measurement unit, star trackers, optical navigation sensors, microwave radar (for range and velocity determination), and laser hazard avoidance sensors. Lanyue's GNC system improves upon those flown on the Chang'e series of robotic lunar landers and on the Tianwen-1 Mars lander, among these improvements is the inclusion of a greater level of system redundancy. Landing simulations demonstrated that the spacecraft's GNC system (both hardare and software) can guide the lander to within 100 metres of a target site and that the instrumental measurement errors are under one metre.

=== Propulsion module engine ===
The propulsion module is the segment of the lander that sequentially propels the spacecraft into trans-lunar injection (TLI), a low lunar orbit (LLO), and an initial lunar-landing descent orbit; the propulsion module is discarded prior to the soft-landing; the propulsion module undergoes a controlled impact on the lunar surface.

The propulsion module is powered by a single YF-58-1 engine burning monomethylhydrazine (MMH) and nitrogen tetroxide (N_{2}O_{4}).

=== Lunar rover ===
Models of the crewed lunar module includes a four-wheeled rover stowed on the lander's external wall. CMSA previously issued an open call to private, public, and educational institutions to submit development plans for the future lunar rover; according to CMSA, fourteen groups submitted proposals in response to the open solicitation and eleven of the fourteen proposals advanced to the expert-review stage. On 24 October 2023, CMSA announced that two of the remaining eleven submitted proposals have advanced to the detailed design phase while another six groups will receive continued support to enable them to continue research into innovative aspects of their proposals. On 29 October 2024, CMSA awarded contracts to two teams (one team from the China Academy of Space Technology and a second team from the Shanghai Academy of Spaceflight Technology) to develop prototypes of the lunar rover. As of 2025 production work was underway and it was anticipated that a public call for proposed rover names would be forthcoming.

Survey of journal literature reveals that the planned lunar rover may incorporate "differential-braking" and "off-ground detection" technologies to enhance its anti-slip and steering-stability characteristics during high-speed traverse. Engineering prototypes have been built for design verification purposes.

The rover's planned mass is about 200 kilograms, and it will be able to carry two astronauts; it has a planned traverse-range of about 10 kilometres.

== Mission architecture ==
China crewed Moon mission profile

Under CMSA's crewed lunar landing plan, the Lanyue spacecraft initially will be injected into an Earth-Moon transfer orbit via the Long March 10 carrier rocket, and subsequently acquire lunar orbit under its own power. It then will await a lunar orbit rendezvous with and docking by the separately launched Mengzhou spacecraft (formerly known as the next-generation crewed spacecraft, the analog to the Apollo program's Apollo command and service module) whereupon two astronauts will transfer to the lander, undock from Mengzhou, and maneuver the landing segment for a lunar-landing attempt.

The landing segment's powered descent phase will employ a "staged-descent" concept. Under this concept, the combined lunar module and propulsion module will begin descending from lunar orbit with the latter providing the necessary deceleration; when the stack is close to the surface, the lunar module will separate from the propulsion module and proceed to complete the powered descent and a soft-landing under its own power (the discarded propulsion stage meanwhile will impact the lunar surface a safe distance away from the crewed lander). At the conclusion of the surface portion of the mission, the full lunar module will act as the ascent vehicle for the astronauts to return to lunar orbit. According to a report by the Xinhua News Agency, the lander also will be capable of autonomous flight operations.

As of 2022, the landing system is envisioned to enable a six-hour stay on the lunar surface by two astronauts. During the previously cited 2023 aerospace forum in Wuhan, Zhang Hailian stated that a lunar surface-EVA spacesuit with an endurance period of no less than eight hours is currently under development. Slides accompanying the presentation made by the chief designer of China's lunar exploration program on 31 October 2026 in Beijing suggest that the then-current plan for the initial landing mission includes lunar surface activities lasting three Earth days, including planned lunar extravehicular activities by the astronauts on each of the three days of the surface mission segment. This would be comparable to the mission duration of the later Apollo missions.

=== Lunar EVA spacesuit ===
On 28 September 2024, CMSA unveiled a spacesuit designed to allow astronauts to conduct extravehicular-activities in the lunar low-gravity environment. The EVA suit has been designed to be lightweight compared to China's current Feitian orbital-class EVA spacesuit. The new spacesuit will protect astronauts from the radiation, thermal variations, and dust that they will encounter in the lunar surface environment. The suit also allows an astronaut to perform movements such as squatting and bending in order to facilitate the performance of work in complex lunar topography. A public competition to name the new spacesuit is currently underway.

== Potential landing sites ==
Members of the Chinese Academy of Sciences have begun site selection research ("suggestions") for the anticipated crewed lunar exploration program. Thirty prime landing sites have been identified (narrowed down from a preliminary list of 106 and an interim list of 50); the thirty sites are located in both the lunar north and south polar regions as well as in the lunar near and far sides. Numerous criteria, intended to maximize mission scientific value while taking into account crew safety and engineering feasibility, were considered by the team. Examples of the 30 prime sites include the following: Ina crater/depression, Reiner Gamma, and Rimae Bode on the lunar near side, Apollo basin, Aitken crater, and Mare Moscoviense on the lunar far side, Shackleton crater in the lunar south polar region, and Hermite crater in the lunar north polar region.

In mid-February 2025, news reports suggest that initial crewed landing attempts may target low-latitude lunar regions such as the equator; these reports were prompted by a February 2025 project announcement issued by the CMSA for proposals to construct a lunar remote sensing satellite "... to obtain high-precision topographic and geomorphic data of the moon’s low-latitude regions, map key mineral resource distributions, and identify characteristic minerals." The satellite is intended to support future crewed lunar landings.

In March 2026, a team from the School of Earth and Planetary Geosciences at the China University of Geosciences (Wuhan) suggested, in an article published by the journal Nature-Astronomy, that the initial lunar landing attempt should target sites within Rimae Bode. The principal advantage for choosing Rimae Bode is that this region contains multiple types of lunar materials and landforms within a relatively small area, including ancient lava flows, rilles (long channel-like features formed by ancient lava flows) and impact ejecta from nearby craters. Since an unpressurized rover will accompany the Lanyue lander, several different geological units can be simultaneously sampled by the astronauts during a single mission. Overall, The team has identified four tentative landing sites within the region.

== Earth-Moon trajectory design ==
Preliminary trajectory designs based on specific landing sites and landing periods have also been carried out by a team from the Nanjing University of Aeronautics and Astronautics and from the China Astronaut Research and Training Center. In particular, the team analyzed possible Earth-Moon transfer trajectories based on seven potential landing sites, including Rimae Bode, a series of lunar rilles west of the Bode crater, and Mare Moscoviense, covering the period from 2027 until 2037. The analysis employed a dynamic weighting method that quantified mission efficiency factors and engineering constraints, combined with the application of a pseudostate trajectory model to optimize the computational efficiency of trajectory design and landing site/time selection; the pseudostate trajectory model was proposed by J. S. Wilson in 1969 and is recognized to be computationally more efficient than the traditional patched-conic method of trajectory design.

== See also ==
- Apollo Lunar Module – NASA crewed Moon landing spacecraft (1969–1972)
- LK (spacecraft) – Soviet lunar module intended to be used in the Soviet lunar landing attempts
- Altair (spacecraft) – Planned lander spacecraft component of NASA's cancelled Project Constellation
- Starship HLS – Lunar lander variant of SpaceX Starship
- Blue Moon (spacecraft) – Lunar lander family for the Artemis program
- List of crewed lunar landers
- Comparison of crewed space vehicles
- Pseudostate trajectory model – Method to calculate trajectories for spacecraft
