= Mengzhou 1 =

Test flight of Mengzhou Crew Capsule

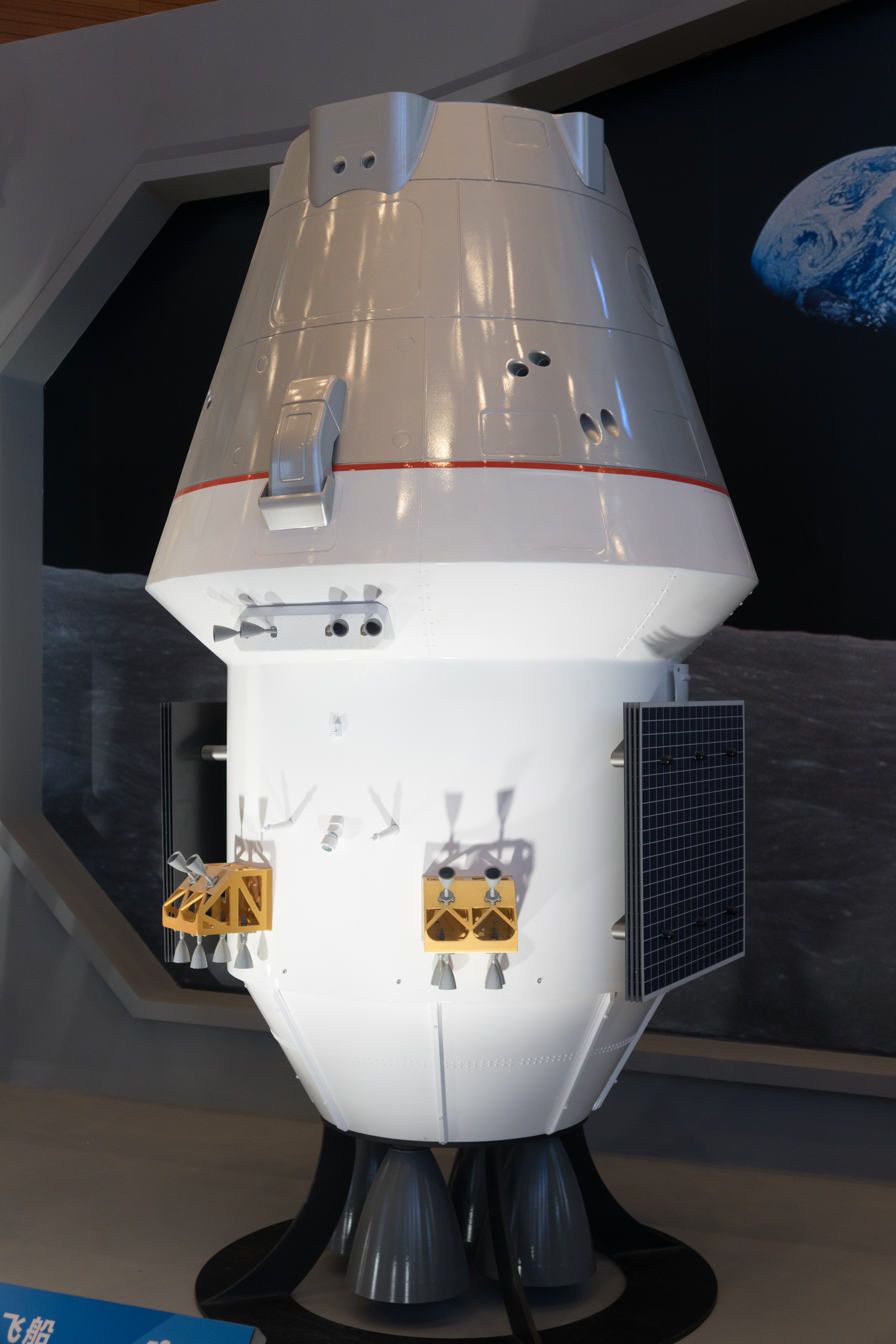
- Mockup of a Mengzhou spacecraft (2023)
- Mission type: Uncrewed flight test
- Operator: China Manned Space Agency

Spacecraft properties
- Spacecraft type: Mengzhou
- Manufacturer: China Aerospace Science and Technology Corporation

Start of mission
- Launch date: 2027 (planned)
- Rocket: Long March 10A
- Launch site: Wenchang, LC-3
- Contractor: China Academy of Launch Vehicle Technology

Orbital parameters
- Reference system: Geocentric orbit
- Regime: Low Earth orbit

Docking with Tiangong space station
- Docking port: Tianhe nadir

Mengzhou 1 (Chinese: 梦舟一号; pinyin: Mèngzhōu yī hào; lit. 'Dream Vessel Number 1') is a planned uncrewed orbital test flight of the Mengzhou spacecraft presently scheduled for 2027. This will also be the maiden orbital flight of the Long March 10A crew-rated rocket. The mission is set to dock to the radial port of the Tiangong space station.

One version of the Mengzhou spacecraft is planned as a future replacement for the Shenzhou spacecraft for missions to Tiangong and a more capable version will be used to transport crews to low lunar orbits for China's planned crewed lunar landings which are expected to occur by the end of the 2020s.

== See also ==
- Artemis I
- Exploration Flight Test-1
- Shenzhou 1
