= Comparison of crewed space vehicles =

A number of different spacecraft have been used to carry people to and from outer space.

== Table code key ==
	Spacecraft under development
	Spacecraft is operational
	Retired spacecraft
‡	Payload To / From the ISS
§	Crewed (Uncrewed) [Includes failures]

== Orbital and interplanetary space vehicles ==
Spacecraft	Origin	Manufacturer	Range	Launch system	Crew size	Length (m)	Diameter (m)	Launch mass (kg)	Power system	Recovery method	Payload (kg) ‡	First spaceflight §	Last spaceflight	Flights §
Mercury	USA	McDonnell Aircraft; North American Aviation	LEO attained	Redstone MRLV; Atlas LV-3B	1	3.34	1.89	1,400	Batteries	Parachute splashdown (one drogue, one main)		1961 (1960)	1963	6 (12) (Note: Including 2 suborbital flights, not including boilerplate tests)
Gemini	USA	McDonnell Aircraft; Martin	LEO	Titan II GLV; Titan IIIC (Note: One uncrewed launch on Titan IIIC ahead of proposed use in MOL programme)	2	5.56	3.05	3,790	Fuel cells	Parachute splashdown (one drogue, one main)		1965 (1964)	1966	10 (2) (Note: Not including boilerplate tests)
Apollo	USA	North American Aviation; Grumman and Douglas	Lunar	Saturn IB; Saturn V	3	8.5	3.91	5,500 CM + 14,700 LM + 24,500 Service Module	Fuel cells	Parachute splashdown (two drogues, three pilots, three mains)		1967 (1966)	1975	15 (4)
Space Shuttle orbiter	USA	Rockwell International	LEO	Space Shuttle	8 (Note: No missions carried more than eight astronauts, although higher crew sizes were theoretically possible, for example recovering the crew of a stranded orbiter.)	37.24	4.8 (Note: Wingspan 23.79m)	109,000	Fuel cells	Runway landing (with one pilot and one drogue chute from mid-1990s)	12,500/16,000	1981	2011	135 (Note: Includes two fatal accidents; STS-51-L disintegrated during ascent, STS-107 damaged during ascent, disintegrated during reentry.)
Soyuz 7K-T	USSR	OKB-1	LEO	Soyuz; Soyuz-U	2	7.48	2.72	6,830	Batteries	Parachute landing		1973	1981	26 (4) (Note: Crewed flights include one launch failure - abort during third stage flight, recovered after suborbital flight)
Voskhod	USSR	OKB-1	LEO	Voskhod	3 (Note: Able to carry three cosmonauts without spacesuits, or two with spacesuits; both combinations flown)	5	2.4	5,682	Batteries	Parachute landing		1964 (1964)	1965	2 (3)
Vostok	USSR	OKB-1	LEO first	Vostok-K	1	4.4	2.43	4,725	Batteries	Parachute landing		1961 (1960)	1963	6 (7) (Note: Uncrewed flight count includes two launch failures)
Soyuz 7K-OK	USSR	OKB-1	LEO	Soyuz	3	7.48	2.72	6,560	Solar panels	Parachute landing		1967 (1966)	1970	8 (8) (Note: Crewed flights include one fatal in-flight failure; Soyuz 1 lost due to parachute failure upon landing.)
Soyuz 7KT-OK	USSR	OKB-1	LEO	Soyuz	3	7.48	2.72	6,790	Solar panels	Parachute landing		1971	1971	2 (Note: Crewed flights include one fatal in-flight failure; Soyuz 11 depressurised during reentry.)
Soyuz 7K-T-AF	USSR	OKB-1	LEO	Soyuz	2	7.48	2.72	6,570	Solar panels	Parachute landing		1973	1973	1
Soyuz 7K-TM	USSR	OKB-1	LEO	Soyuz-U	2	7.48	2.72	6,570	Solar panels	Parachute landing		1974	1975	2 (2)
Soyuz 7K-MF6	USSR	OKB-1	LEO	Soyuz-U	2	7.48	2.72	6,510	Solar panels	Parachute landing		1976	1976	1
Soyuz-T	USSR	OKB-1	LEO	Soyuz-U; Soyuz-U2	3	7.48	2.72	6,850	Solar panels	Parachute landing		1978	1986	15 (6) (Note: Crewed flights include one launch failure (SAS (launch escape system) used ~70 seconds before planned liftoff due to fire on launch pad - crew survived))
Soyuz-TM	USSR; Russia	RKK Energia	LEO	Soyuz-U2; Soyuz-U	3	7.48	2.72	7,250	Solar panels	Parachute landing		1986	2002	33 (1)
Buran	USSR	RKK Energia	LEO	Energia	10	36.37	4.65 (Note: Wingspan 23.92m)	105,000	Fuel cells	Runway landing with three drogue chutes	30,000 (Note: planned payload, never used)	N/A (1988)	(1988)	0 (1)
Soyuz-TMA; 11F732	Russia	RKK Energia	LEO	Soyuz-FG	3	7.48	2.72	7,250	Solar panels	Parachute landing with retrorockets		2002	2012	22
Soyuz TMA-M; 11F747	Russia	RKK Energia	LEO	Soyuz-FG	3	7.48	2.72	7,150	Solar panels	Parachute landing with retrorockets		2010	2016	19
Shenzhou	China	China Academy of Space Technology	LEO	Chang Zheng 2F	3	9.25	2.80	7,840	Solar panels	Parachute landing		2003 (1999)	Active	12 (5)
Soyuz MS	Russia	RKK Energia	LEO	Soyuz-2.1a	3	7.48	2.72	7,080	Solar panels	Parachute landing with retrorockets		2016	Active	22 (2)
Crew Dragon	USA	SpaceX	LEO	Falcon 9	4	8.1	3.7	12,055	Solar Panels	Parachute splashdown (two drogues, four mains), propulsive landing or splashdown for emergencies	3,307/2,507	2020 (2019)	Active	19 (1)
CST-100 Starliner	USA	Boeing	LEO	Atlas V	7 (Note: Each mission in the Commercial Crew Program will send up to four astronauts to the ISS)	5.03	4.56	13,000	Solar panels	Parachute landing (two forward cover chutes, two drogues, three pilots and three mains) with airbags		2024 (2019)	Active	1 (2)
Orion	USA	Lockheed Martin; Astrium	Lunar, Mars	Space Launch System	4 (Note: Originally set to launch up to 6 astronauts, when designed for transportation of crew to the ISS under the Constellation Program)	3.3	5	8,900 capsule + 12,300 service module	Solar panels	Parachute splashdown (two drogues, three pilots and three mains)		2025 (2014)	Active	2 (3) (Note: Including uncrewed test in 2014)
Starship	USA	SpaceX	Solar System	Starship	100	55	9	1,335,000	Solar Panels	Propulsive landing (booster stage caught by mechanical arms on the launch tower when landing on launch site)	100000	2023	Testing	0 (12)
Mengzhou	China	China Aerospace Science and Technology Corporation	LEO, Lunar	Long March 10	7	8.8	4.5	21,600	Solar panels			2026 (2020)	Testing	0 (1)
Gaganyaan	India	Indian Space Research Organization	LEO	GSLV Mk III	3	7	3.5	7,800	Solar Panels	Parachute splashdown (with drogues and mains)		(Planned: 2024)	Planned	0
Orel	Russia	RKK Energia	LEO, Lunar	Irtysh (rocket); Angara A5	6	6.1		37,478	Solar panels			(Planned: 2028)	Planned	0
Dream Chaser	USA	Sierra Nevada Corporation	LEO	Vulcan Centaur	7	9	7 (Note: Including wings)	11,300	Solar panels	Runway landing		TBA	Planned	0
Biconic Space Vehicle	USA	Blue Origin	LEO	New Glenn	7	98	7					TBA	Planned	0
Nyx	Germany France	The Exploration Company	LEO, Lunar	Ariane 6 or Falcon 9	5		2.5	8,000	Solar panels	parachute landing in water	4,000 LEO, 2,000 Lunar	TBA	Planned	0

== Suborbital space vehicles ==
Spacecraft	Origin	Manufacturer	Altitude	Launch system	Crew size	Length (m)	Diameter (m)	Launch mass (kg)	Power system	Recovery method	First spaceflight §	Last spaceflight	Flights §
SpaceShipOne	USA	Scaled Composites	112 km X Prize	White Knight; Hybrid Motor	1	8.53	8.05	3,600	Batteries	Runway landing	2004	2004	3 (Note: Does not include crewed atmospheric flights)
X-15	USA	North American Aviation	108 km altitude	B-52; Ammonia-LOX	1	15.45	6.8	15,420	Two 28 volt-300 amp DC generators	Runway landing	1963 (Note: Does not include only-U.S.-recognized spaceflights)	1963	2 (Note: Does not include atmospheric flights, or missions considered spaceflights by the US definition but not the FAI's definition)
SpaceShipTwo	USA	Virgin Galactic	90 km	White Knight Two; RocketMotorTwo	8 (Note: 2 crew + 6 passengers)	18.3	8.3	9,740	Batteries	Runway landing	December 13, 2018	2024	2 (Note: Does not include crewed atmospheric flights)
New Shepard	USA	Blue Origin	119 km	New Shepard; BE-3	6	18	3.7	75,000 (Note: to date only 45,000)	Batteries	Parachute landing (three drogues, three mains) with retrorockets	2021 (2015)		14 (34)
Spica Rocket	Denmark	Copenhagen Suborbitals	105 km	BPM100	1	13	1	4,100	Batteries	Parachute splashdown	Planned	Early Development	0

== See also ==
- Cargo spacecraft (robotic resupply spacecraft)
- Comparison of orbital launch systems
- Comparison of orbital rocket engines
- Comparison of space station cargo vehicles
- Human spaceflight
