= Mengzhou (spacecraft) =

Chinese deep-space crewed spacecraft in development

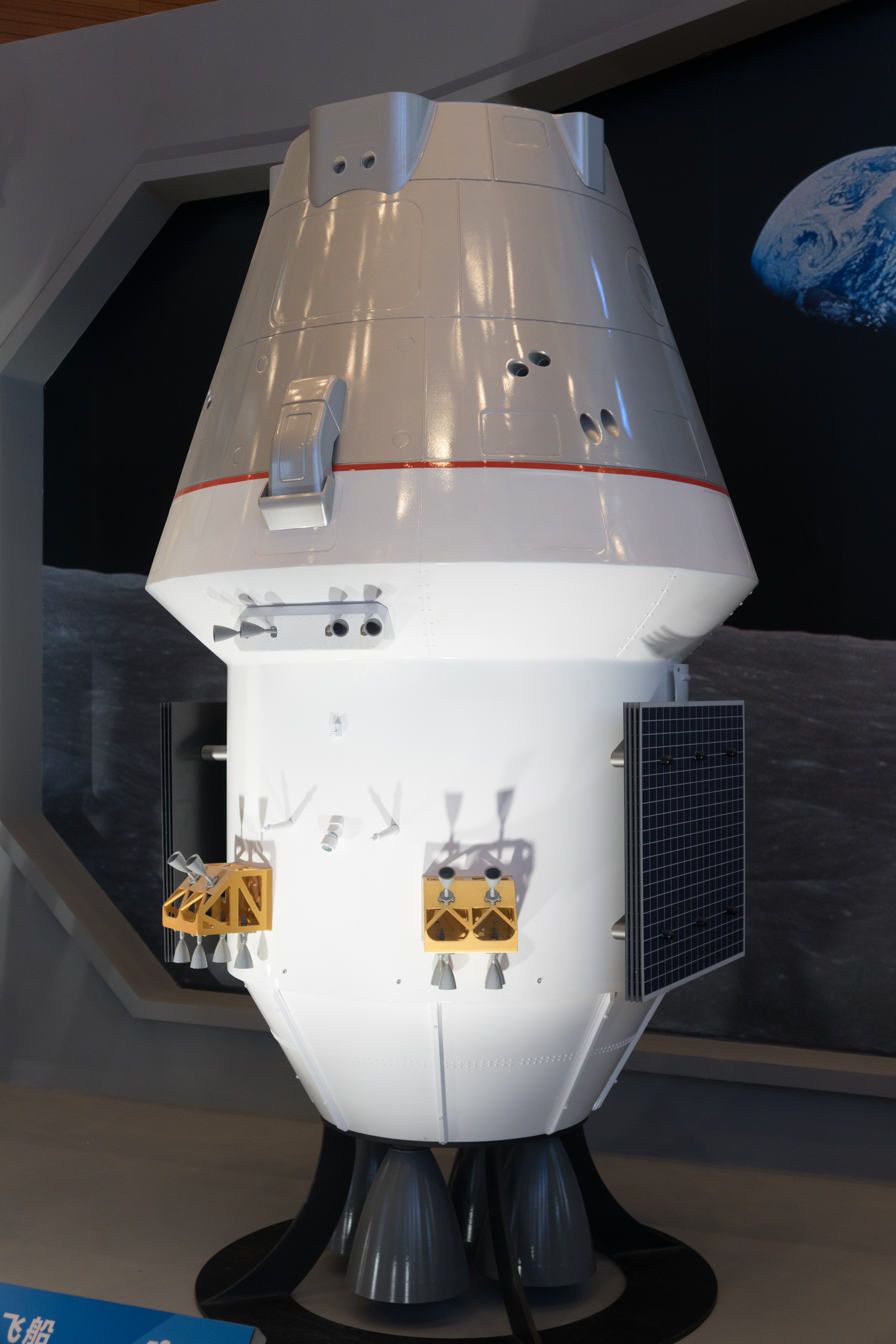
- Mengzhou spacecraft mockup displayed in 2023
- Manufacturer: China Academy of Space Technology
- Country of origin: China
- Operator: China Manned Space Agency
- Applications: Tiangong space station crew and cargo transport Crewed exploration beyond LEO

Specifications
- Spacecraft type: Crewed
- Launch mass: Total mass: 14,000 kg (31,000 lb) (LEO configuration); Total mass: 21,600 kg (47,600 lb) (lunar configuration); Maximum mass: 23,000 kg (51,000 lb) New version: 26,000 kg (57,000 lb)
- Dry mass: Crew module: 5,600 kg (12,300 lb) (landing mass)
- Payload capacity: Total payload: 4,000 kg (8,800 lb); Recoverable payload:2,500 kg (5,500 lb)
- Crew capacity: 6-7 crew; 3 crew with 500 kg (1,100 lb) cargo
- Volume: Crew module: 13 m^{3} (459 ft^{3})
- Power: Solar
- Regime: Low Earth orbit, lunar Transfer Orbit, lunar orbit
- Design life: 21 days

Dimensions
- Length: Total length: 7.23 metres (23.7 ft) (LEO configuration); Total length: 8.8 metres (29 ft) (lunar configuration)
- Diameter: Crew module: 4.5 metres (15 ft)

Production
- Status: Testing
- Built: 2
- Launched: 2 (Note: Includes prototypes and both orbital and suborbital launches)
- Maiden launch: LM5B-Y1 (5 May 2020)

The Mengzhou (Chinese: 梦舟; pinyin: Mèngzhōu; lit. 'Dream Vessel'), formerly known as the Next-Generation Crewed Spacecraft, (Note: 新一代载人飞船; Xīnyīdài Zàirén Fēichuán) is a crewed spacecraft in development by China Aerospace Science and Technology Corporation (CASC). Its crewed flight capability is expected around 2027–2028. It comprises a seven-astronaut capacity crew module and an expendable service module for propulsion, solar power, and life support. Its role is similar to the operational US Orion and proposed Russian Orel lunar spacecraft.

The lunar landing version (Note: 登月版; dēng yuè bǎn) is designed to enter lunar orbit and dock with the Lanyue lander, each separately launched on a Long March 10 rocket. Unlike Shenzhou, China's only crewed spacecraft since 2005, it will be more radiation hardened and suitable for the more ionized atmospheric entry at lunar return velocity. The near-Earth version (Note: 近地版; jìn dì bǎn) focuses on reusability, launching crews on the Long March 10A to the Tiangong space station, replacing Shenzhou. Both versions will be the first crewed flights from China's southernmost Wenchang Space Launch Site in Hainan.

Uncrewed orbital return tests were conducted with a scale model in 2016 and full-scale craft aboard a Long March 5B in 2020; the latter used a skip maneuver re-entry from medium Earth orbit. After a 2025 pad abort test, in February 2026 a Mengzhou craft was mated to a Long March 10 test stage, testing the launch escape system during the max q flight phase. The Mengzhou 1 uncrewed test flight aims to dock with Tiangong in 2027.

== Nomenclature ==
The spacecraft's name, Mengzhou (lit. 'dream vessel'), references the goal of lunar exploration and has been associated with Xi Jinping's Chinese Dream concept. The crewed lunar lander's name, Lanyue (揽月; lǎn yuè; 'embracing the Moon'), derives from a line in Mao Zedong's 1965 poem "Reascending Jinggang Mountain"(重上井冈山; Chóng shàng Jǐnggāng Shān), in which embracing the Moon is described as an aspiration. The names were announced in February 2024 following a public naming competition. Commentators have described the pairing of references to Xi Jinping and Mao Zedong in the spacecraft names as symbolically linking the two leaders.

== Overview ==
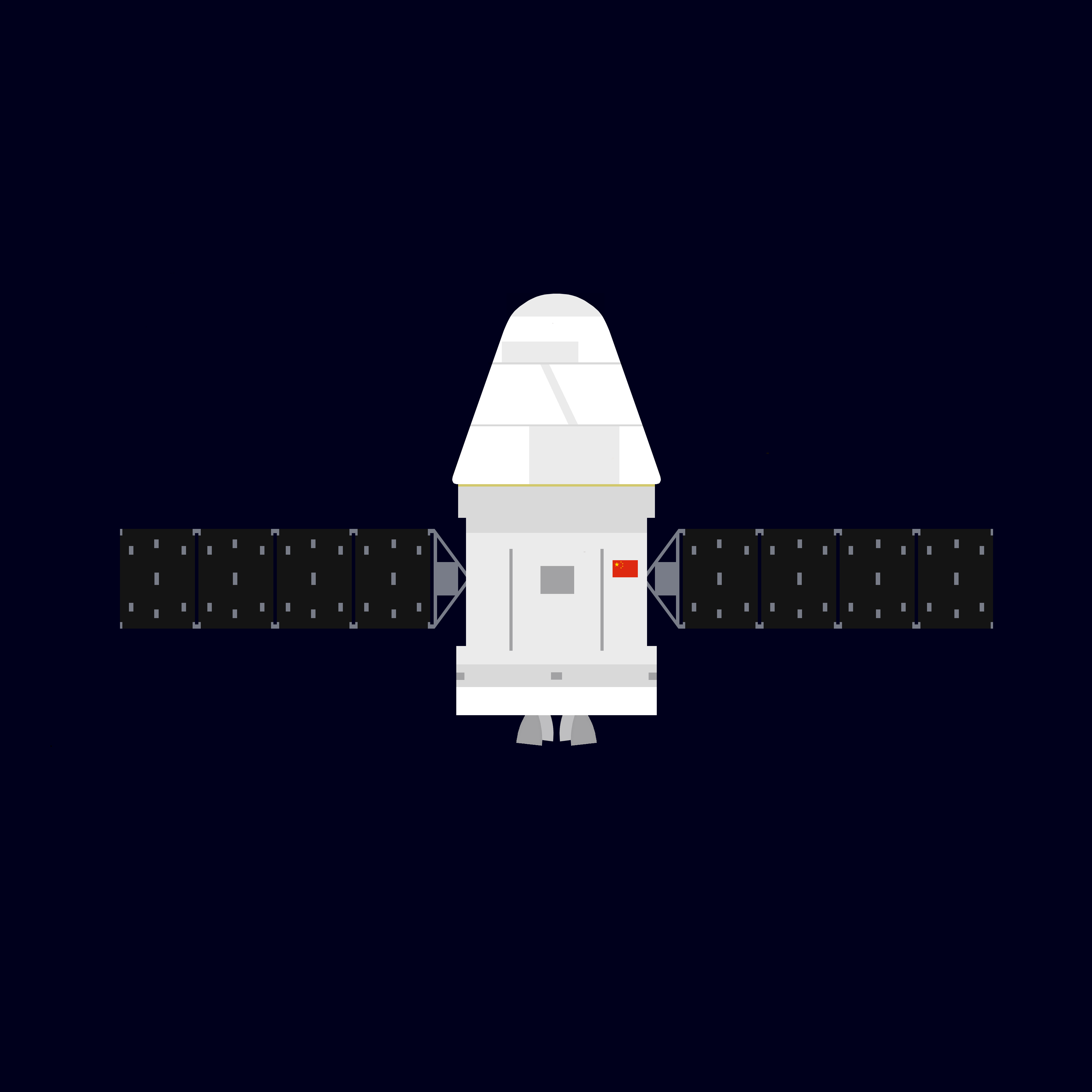
Diagram of the next generation crewed spacecraft tested in 2020

Intended to replace the Shenzhou spacecraft, the new vehicle is larger and lunar-capable. It consists of two modules: a crew module that returns to Earth, and an expendable service module to provide propulsion, power and life support for the crew module while in space. It is capable of carrying seven astronauts, or three astronauts and 500 kg (1,100 lb) of cargo. The new crew module is partially reusable with detachable heat shields, while the entire spacecraft features a modular design that allows it to be adapted to meet different mission demands. With its propulsion and power module, the crew spacecraft measures nearly 8.8 metres (29 ft) long and weighs around 21,600 kg (47,600 lb) fully loaded with equipment and propellant, according to the China Manned Space Agency (CMSA). Lunar missions undertaken by the Mengzhou spacecraft and the Lanyue lander are planned by 2030.

The returned test vehicle was temporarily displayed at the Zhuhai Airshow in 2021.

On 29 October 2024, CMSA announced that a series of major ground tests have been completed on the spacecraft, including an integrated airdrop test.

== Test flights ==
=== 2016 ===
The maiden flight of the Long March 7 launched from the Wenchang Space Launch Site on 25 June 2016 at 12:00 UTC, carrying a scaled prototype of Mengzhou known as the multipurpose spacecraft scale return capsule. The capsule returned successfully, landing in the desert of Inner Mongolia on 26 June 2016 at 07:41 UTC.

=== 2020 ===
The test flight of Long March 5B with the Mengzhou test vehicle as primary payload.

The Long March 5B test flight on 5 May 2020 at 10:00 UTC from Wenchang carried two payloads: a Mengzhou prototype as the primary payload and a demonstration flexible inflatable cargo re-entry capsule as a secondary payload. The Mengzhou prototype evaluated avionics, orbital performance, heat shielding, parachute deployment, and a cushioned airbag landing system, successfully re-entering on 8 May 2020 at 05:49 UTC in northwestern China. The secondary payload, intended to test a flexible heat shield for cargo return, was scheduled to re-enter on 6 May 2020 but malfunctioned during descent.

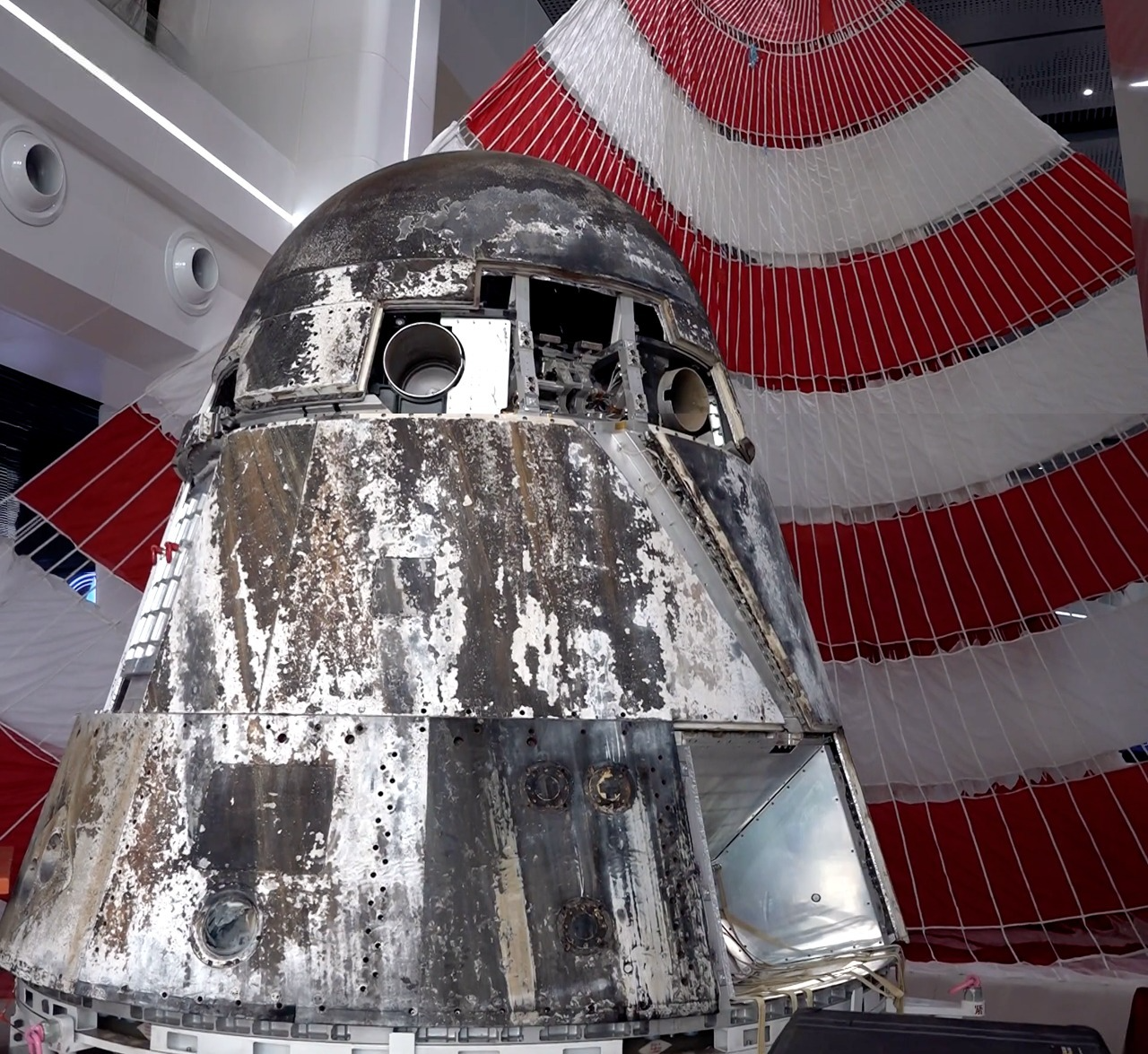
Mengzhou 2020 prototype return capsule during post landing ceremony.

During its orbital test, the Mengzhou prototype performed seven orbit-raising maneuvers to reach a final apogee of approximately 8,000 kilometres (5,000 mi). The vehicle executed a de-orbit burn at 05:21 UTC, followed by separation of the service and crew modules at 05:33 UTC. Before atmospheric re-entry, the capsule performed a skip maneuver using aerodynamic lift to reduce peak heating, a technique suitable for high-speed returns such as from the Moon. It then deployed three parachutes and airbags for a safe landing. CMSA reported that the re-entry velocity exceeded 9 kilometres per second (5.6 mi/s).

=== 2025 ===
On 17 June 2025, CMSA conducted a zero-altitude abort (also known as a pad abort test) test using a Mengzhou test article at the Jiuquan Satellite Launch Center. The test, designed to evaluate crew-safety systems in the event of an emergency on the pad or during the initial stages of a launch, was declared fully successful by CMSA.

=== 2026 ===
On 11 February 2026, CMSA conducted an in-flight abort test during the maximum dynamic pressure (max q) phase of a Long March 10 (CZ-10) launch at Launch Complex 301 of the Wenchang Space Launch Site. The test involved a Mengzhou test article and a CZ-10 first-stage test article. The CZ-10 launch-abort system successfully propelled Mengzhou away from the rocket approximately 65 seconds into flight, at an altitude of about 11 kilometres (6.8 mi) and a pressure of 27 kilopascals (3.9 psi). Both test articles landed safely at sea, with the crew module descending by parachute and the first stage using a controlled, rocket-assisted splashdown.

Development test flights
Mission	Launch (UTC)	Launch site	Launch vehicle	Outcome	Duration
Scale return capsule test	25 June 2016, 12:00	Wenchang, LC‑201	Long March 7	Success	1 day, 19 hours, 41 minutes
Spacecraft test	5 May 2020, 10:00	Wenchang, LC‑101	Long March 5B	Success	2 days, 19 hours, 49 minutes
Pad abort test	17 June 2025, 04:30	Jiuquan	Launch escape system	Success	~2 minutes
Max q abort test	11 February 2026, 03:00	Wenchang, LC‑301	Long March 10 test stage	Success	14 minutes, 25 seconds (Note: Official video feeds of the launch show the CZ-10 lift off at 11:00:08 from LC-301 and the Mengzhou crew module splash down in the South China Sea at 11:14:33.)

== Mission summary ==
Orbital flights
Flight	Mission	Launch (UTC)	Launch site	Launch vehicle	Orbit	Crew	Outcome
1	Mengzhou 1	c. 2027	Wenchang, LC‑301	Long March 10A	LEO	—N/a	Planned
1	First orbital test flight of an uncrewed Mengzhou spacecraft						

== See also ==
- Lanyue (spacecraft)
- Comparison of crewed space vehicles
- Orion (spacecraft)
- SpaceX Dragon 2
- Boeing Starliner
- Orel (spacecraft)
- Gaganyaan
