= Feitian =

Feitian may refer to:

- Feitian space suit, a Chinese space suit
- Feitian Technologies Co., Ltd., an information security provider in China
- Feitian, the Chinese word for apsara, a flying deva of Hindu and Buddhist mythology
- Feitian Awards, short name of Flying Apsaras Awards, Chinese TV awards ceremony

Chinese place

- Feitian, Leiyang (淝田镇), a town of Leiyang City, Hunan.
