= Pseudostate trajectory model =

Method to calculate trajectories for spacecraft

The pseudostate trajectory model is an approximation method to calculate spacecraft trajectories in the presence of more than one planetary-sized bodies. This method was developed as an astrodynamical calculations model by J.S. Wilson in order to improve upon the method of patched conic approximation.

== Method ==
The pseudostate model was first proposed by J. S. Wilson in 1969 to study Earth-Moon spacecraft transfer trajectories. In the context of an Earth-Moon-spacecraft three-body system, the pseudostate method usually is more computationally efficient than the traditional patched-conic method of trajectory design.

The patched-conic method essentially seeks to "patch" together two (Keplerian) two-body ellipses (the conics) at a point of intersection defined by the Moon's gravitational sphere of influence, while taking into account the various physical constraints. This method can result in large errors that may be controlled by a possibly unstable and time-consuming iterative computational process. The pseudostate model modifies the conic-patching method by defining a pseudostate transformation sphere (PTS), a region in which the spacecraft trajectory is calculated as an approximate solution to the restricted three-body problem.

The method starts by calculating an initial simple two-body Earth-spacecraft ellipse and using it to propagate the spacecraft's position to a point within the Moon's PTS (the spacecraft's pseudostate), next the approximate restricted three-body solution is applied and the pseudostate is backward propagated to a point on the surface of the Laplace sphere, which defines the beginning of the Moon's gravitational sphere of influence, and finally a two-body Moon-spacecraft conic is calculated and the spacecraft location is forward propagated from the surface of the Laplace sphere to an arbitrary perilune point. The Laplace sphere and the gravitational sphere of influence concepts used in the two models, when applied to Earth-Moon system with an approximately circular orbit, is given by

$$R_\text{Laplace} \; = \; D \; \left( \frac{m}{M} \right)^{2/5}$$

where $R_\text{Laplace}$ is the radius of Laplace sphere, $D$ is the average Earth-Moon distance, $m$ is the mass of the Moon and $M$ is the Earth's mass. Strictly speaking, the Laplace sphere is not a sphere but a changing hypersurface defined at each point of the path of a gravitational mass. The criterion for calculating the Moon's Laplace sphere is to analyze the Moon's gravity as the primary force acting in the region under consideration while the Earth's gravity is treated as a perturbing force. The Laplace sphere differs from the Hill sphere because the calculation of the latter sphere requires the presence of stable orbits while the former does not.

== Application ==
An example where this approximation method was used to calculate spacecraft trajectories was published in the September 2023 issue of the Journal of Astronautics by Ding et al.

== See also ==
- Patched conic approximation
- Two-body problem
- N-body problem
- Sphere of influence
