= Patched conic approximation =

Method to calculate trajectory calculations for spacecraft

In astrodynamics, the patched conic approximation or patched two-body approximation is a method to simplify trajectory calculations for spacecraft in a multiple-body environment.

== Method ==
The simplification is achieved by dividing space into various parts by assigning each of the n bodies (e.g. the Sun, planets, moons) its own sphere of influence. When the spacecraft is within the sphere of influence of a smaller body, only the gravitational force between the spacecraft and that smaller body is considered, otherwise the gravitational force between the spacecraft and the larger body is used. This reduces a complicated n-body problem to multiple two-body problems, for which the solutions are the well-known conic sections of the Kepler orbits.

Although this method gives a good approximation of trajectories for interplanetary spacecraft missions, there are missions for which this approximation does not provide sufficiently accurate results. Notably, it does not model Lagrangian points.

=== Mathematical formulation ===
In the patched conic approximation, the spacecraft trajectory is modeled as a sequence of two-body problems. Within the sphere of influence of a body with gravitational parameter $\mu$, the spacecraft motion satisfies:
$$\ddot{\mathbf{r}} = -\frac{\mu}{r^3}\mathbf{r}$$
The solution in each region is a conic section (elliptic, parabolic, or hyperbolic), which can be expressed using classical orbital elements or state vectors. At the boundary between spheres of influence, the trajectory segments are "patched" by enforcing continuity of position and velocity:
$$\mathbf{r}_- = \mathbf{r}_+, \qquad \mathbf{v}_- = \mathbf{v}_+$$
For example, when departing a planet, the spacecraft follows a hyperbolic escape trajectory with hyperbolic excess velocity $\mathbf{v}_\infty$. This velocity is then used as the initial condition for the heliocentric trajectory:
$$\mathbf{v}_{\text{helio}} = \mathbf{v}_{\text{planet}} + \mathbf{v}_\infty$$
This process is repeated at each sphere of influence boundary to construct an approximate multi-body trajectory.

== Example: Earth-to-Mars transfer ==
On an Earth-to-Mars transfer, a hyperbolic trajectory is required to escape from Earth's gravity well, then an elliptic or hyperbolic trajectory in the Sun's sphere of influence is required to transfer from Earth's sphere of influence to that of Mars, etc. By patching these conic sections together—matching the position and velocity vectors between segments—the appropriate mission trajectory can be found.

=== Numerical example ===
A simple Earth-to-Mars patched conic calculation can be made by assuming circular, coplanar planetary orbits and a Hohmann transfer orbit between the mean orbital radii of Earth and Mars. Let
$$r_E = 1.496\times 10^8\ \text{km}, \qquad
r_M = 2.279\times 10^8\ \text{km}, \qquad
\mu_\odot = 1.327\times 10^{11}\ \text{km}^3/\text{s}^2$$
The semi-major axis of the heliocentric transfer ellipse is
$$a_t = \frac{r_E+r_M}{2} = 1.888\times 10^8\ \text{km}$$
The circular heliocentric speeds of Earth and Mars are
$$v_E = \sqrt{\frac{\mu_\odot}{r_E}} = 29.8\ \text{km/s},
\qquad
v_M = \sqrt{\frac{\mu_\odot}{r_M}} = 24.1\ \text{km/s}$$
Using the vis-viva equation, the spacecraft speed on the transfer ellipse at Earth's orbit is
$$v_{t,E} =
\sqrt{\mu_\odot\left(\frac{2}{r_E}-\frac{1}{a_t}\right)}
= 32.7\ \text{km/s}$$
For this tangential, prograde transfer, the required Earth departure hyperbolic excess speed is
$$v_{\infty,E} = v_{t,E}-v_E = 2.94\ \text{km/s}$$
In the patched conic approximation, this quantity becomes the hyperbolic excess speed of the Earth departure hyperbola. If the spacecraft departs from a circular low Earth parking orbit with radius $r_p=6,578\ \text{km}$, then the required impulsive burn is approximately
$$\Delta v_E =
\sqrt{v_{\infty,E}^2+\frac{2\mu_E}{r_p}}
-
\sqrt{\frac{\mu_E}{r_p}}
= 3.61\ \text{km/s}$$
where $\mu_E = 398,600\ \text{km}^3/\text{s}^2$. At Mars, the spacecraft speed on the transfer ellipse is
$$v_{t,M} =
\sqrt{\mu_\odot\left(\frac{2}{r_M}-\frac{1}{a_t}\right)}
= 21.5\ \text{km/s}$$
For this tangential transfer, the Mars arrival hyperbolic excess speed is the magnitude of the difference between Mars's circular speed and the transfer orbit speed
$$v_{\infty,M} = v_M-v_{t,M} = 2.65\ \text{km/s}$$
This becomes the hyperbolic excess speed of the Mars arrival hyperbola. For insertion into a circular orbit 200 km above Mars, taking $r_p = 3,596\ \text{km}$ and $\mu_M=42,828\ \text{km}^3/\text{s}^2$, the approximate capture burn is
$$\Delta v_M =
\sqrt{v_{\infty,M}^2+\frac{2\mu_M}{r_p}}
-
\sqrt{\frac{\mu_M}{r_p}}
= 2.10\ \text{km/s}$$
The heliocentric time of flight for the Hohmann transfer is half the period of the transfer ellipse:
$$t = \pi\sqrt{\frac{a_t^3}{\mu_\odot}}
= 2.24\times 10^7\ \text{s}
\approx 259\ \text{days}$$

== See also ==
- Two-body problem
- N-body problem
- Sphere of influence
- Kerbal Space Program, a popular spaceflight simulator based on the patched conic approximation
- Pseudostate trajectory model

== Bibliography ==
- Carlson, K. M. (1970-11-30). An Analytical Solution to Patched-Conic Trajectories Satisfying Initial and Final Boundary Conditions (pdf). Technical Memorandum (Technical report). Bellcomm Inc. TM-70-2011-1.
