= Long March 10 =

Chinese super-heavy carrier rocket

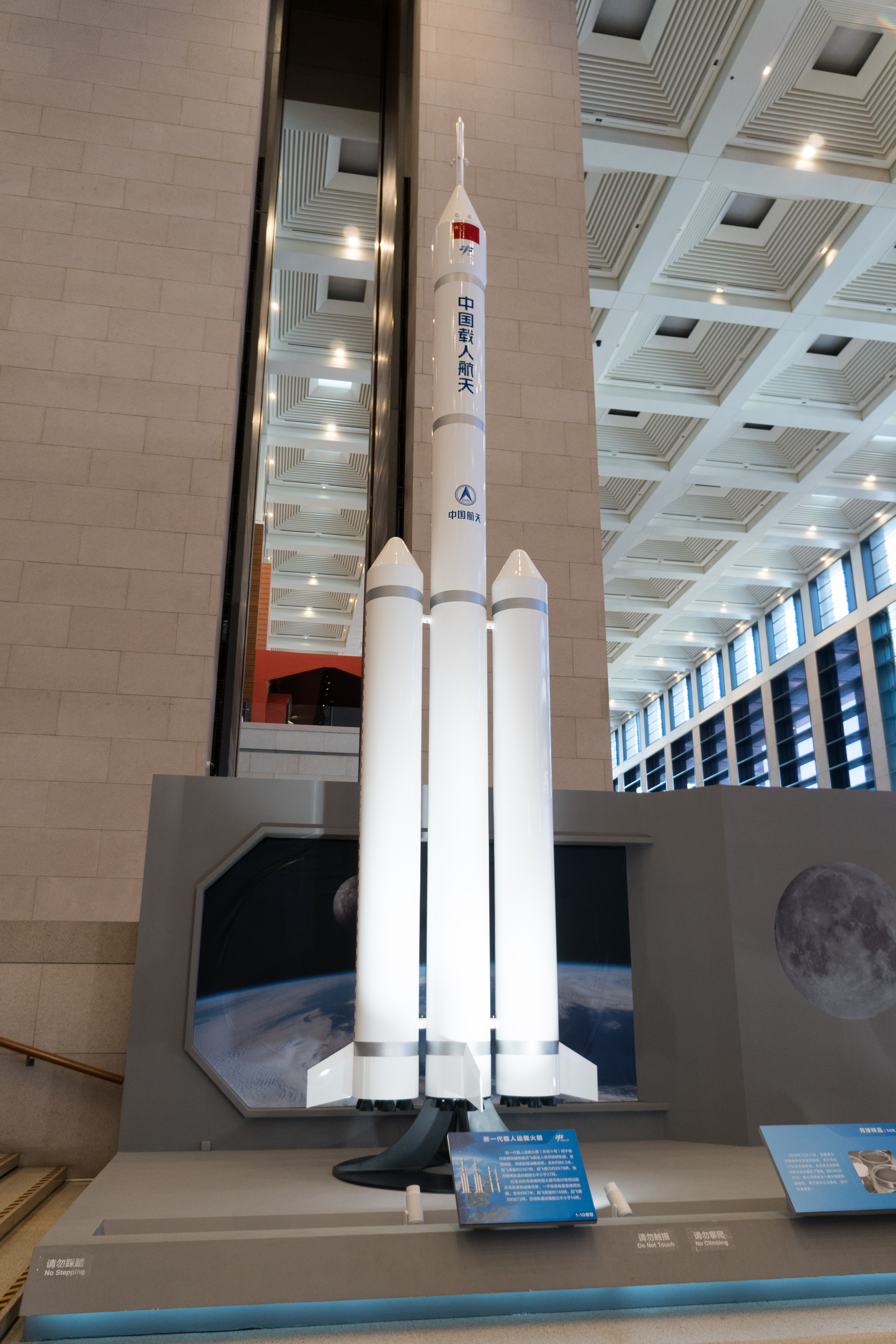
- 1:10 scale model of the Long March 10 at the National Museum of China
- Function: 10: Super heavy-lift launch vehicle; 10A: Medium-lift launch vehicle
- Manufacturer: China Academy of Launch Vehicle Technology
- Country of origin: China

Size
- Height: 92.5 m (303 ft)
- Diameter: 5 m (16 ft 5 in)
- Mass: 2,189,000 kg (4,826,000 lb)
- Stages: 2 or 3

Capacity

Payload to LEO (-10)
- Mass: 70,000 kg (150,000 lb)

Payload to LEO (-10A)
- Mass: 14,000 kg (31,000 lb)

Payload to TLI (-10)
- Mass: 27,000 kg (60,000 lb)

Associated rockets
- Family: Long March
- Derivative work: Long March 10B
- Comparable: 10: Falcon Heavy; New Glenn; Space Launch System; 10A: Falcon 9 Block 5; Long March 7

Launch history
- Status: In development
- Launch sites: Wenchang, LC‑301
- Total launches: 1 (first stage only)
- Success(es): 1
- Carries passengers or cargo: Mengzhou, Lanyue

Boosters (-10 only)
- No. boosters: 2
- Propellant mass: 520,000 kg (1,150,000 lb)
- Powered by: 7 × YF-100K
- Maximum thrust: SL: 8,750 kN (1,970,000 lb_{f}) vac: 9,772 kN (2,197,000 lb_{f})
- Total thrust: SL: 17,500 kN (3,900,000 lb_{f}) vac: 19,544 kN (4,394,000 lb_{f})
- Specific impulse: SL: 301.6 s (2.958 km/s) vac: 337 s (3.30 km/s)
- Burn time: 173 seconds
- Propellant: RP-1 / LOX

First stage
- Propellant mass: 680,000 kg (1,500,000 lb)
- Powered by: 7 × YF-100K
- Maximum thrust: SL: 8,750 kN (1,970,000 lb_{f}) vac: 9,772 kN (2,197,000 lb_{f})
- Specific impulse: SL: 301.6 s (2.958 km/s) vac: 337 s (3.30 km/s)
- Burn time: 227 seconds
- Propellant: RP-1 / LOX

Second stage
- Propellant mass: 185,000 kg (408,000 lb)
- Powered by: 2 × YF-100M
- Maximum thrust: 2,920 kN (660,000 lb_{f})
- Specific impulse: 352.3 s (3.455 km/s)
- Burn time: 215 seconds
- Propellant: RP-1 / LOX

Third stage (-10 only)
- Propellant mass: 59,000 kg (130,000 lb)
- Powered by: 3 × YF-75E
- Maximum thrust: 276.3 kN (62,100 lb_{f})
- Specific impulse: 451.1 s (4.424 km/s)
- Burn time: 924 seconds
- Propellant: LH_{2} / LOX

Long March 10 (LM-10; Chinese: 长征十号; pinyin: Chángzhēng Shíhào) or Changzheng 10 (CZ-10) (Note: Also known as the "Next Generation crewed launch vehicle" (Chinese: 新一代载人运载火箭; pinyin: Xīnyīdài Zàirén Yùnzàihuǒjiàn), and previously and unofficially as the "921 rocket" (Chinese: 921火箭; pinyin: 921-huǒjiàn). The nickname "921" refers to 21 September 1992, the founding date of China's human spaceflight programme. It has also been referred to as the Long March 5G/5H/5DY, reflecting its origins as a development of the Long March 5.) is a family of three rockets under development by the China Academy of Launch Vehicle Technology for crewed lunar missions, flights to the Tiangong space station, and commercial launches.

The standard Long March 10 is a three-stage super heavy-lift rocket with a core and two boosters of a common design: a five-meter-wide kerolox-fuelled stage powered by seven YF-100K engines. It is designed to launch a single Mengzhou crewed orbiter or Lanyue lander, with a trans-lunar injection (TLI) burn from its hydrolox third stage of three YF-75E engines. It has a payload capacity of 70 tonnes (150,000 lb) to low Earth orbit (LEO) and at least 27 tonnes (60,000 lb) to TLI.

The Long March 10A and Long March 10B are medium-lift variants, omitting the boosters and third stage; their first stage is designed for recovery and reuse via vertical landing on a floating platform. The CZ-10A is designed for crew and cargo transport to Tiangong, superseding the Long March 2F and Long March 7 respectively, with a capacity of at least 14 tonnes (31,000 lb) to LEO. The CZ-10B is a commercial launch variant of the Long March 10A, with a methalox second stage, increasing its LEO capacity to at least 16 tonnes (35,000 lb).

In February 2026, a CZ-10 first stage booster launched from Wenchang Space Launch Site and performed a controlled splashdown 200 metres (660 ft) from its landing platform in the South China Sea. In July, the maiden CZ-10B launch achieved orbit and a first stage platform landing. The CZ-10A maiden orbital flight, carrying Mengzhou 1, is planned for late 2026; crewed lunar missions are planned culminating in a landing by 2030, after which the much larger Long March 9 is planned to replace it in the super-heavy lift role.

== Overview ==
The Long March 10 is planned to be a human-rated super heavy launch vehicle designed to launch China's Mengzhou crewed lunar spacecraft and its future Lanyue crewed lunar lander, as part of its crewed space program, codenamed Project 921. Its notional debut was at the 12th China International Aviation & Aerospace Exhibition in November 2018, where it was announced that the China Academy of Launch Vehicle Technology (CALT) is developing a vehicle with a lunar orbit capacity of about 30 tonnes (66,000 lb), meeting the requirements for crewed lunar exploration. Documents and presentations in subsequent years depicted modified Long March 5 configurations known as CZ-5DY (pinyin abbreviation for 'Deng Yue' 登月 or 'lunar landing'), CZ-5G, and CZ-5H.

In February 2023, at the "30 Years of China's Manned Spaceflight" exhibition held at the National Museum of China, a model of the next-generation crew launch vehicle was labeled as "Long March 10." An article later published by China Aerospace Science and Technology Corporation also used the term "Long March 10" to refer to the rocket.

=== Standard configuration ===
The standard variant of the vehicle consists of two boosters, first, second and third stage cores, escape tower, and fairing. All stages and the boosters have a diameter of 5 metres (16 ft 5 in) The first-stage core and the two boosters each are equipped with seven YF-100K engines (for a total of 21 operational engines at liftoff). The second-stage is equipped with two YF-100M engines. The third-stage is equipped with three YF-75E engines. The vehicle's total length is approximately 90 metres (300 ft), with a liftoff weight of 2,187 tonnes (4,822,000 lb). The diameter of its core stage is the same as that of the Long March 5, but its height is about one-third taller.

China crewed Moon mission profile.

The rocket has a payload capacity of 70 tonnes (150,000 lb) to low Earth orbit and at least 27 tonnes (60,000 lb) to a trans-lunar injection trajectory. The proposed crewed lunar mission would use two Long March 10s; the crewed spacecraft and the lunar landing stack would launch separately and subsequently rendezvous in lunar orbit, prior to a crewed lunar landing attempt. The development of the rocket along with relatively detailed specifications were announced at the 2020 China Space Conference.

=== Long March 10A variant ===
The Long March 10A is a single stick variant (no boosters) with only two stages; it has seven YF-100K engines on the first stage and a single YF-100M engine on the second stage, This variant is designed for low Earth orbit crew and cargo flights; it is part of the Chinese space program's plan to increase lift capacity, explore reusability, and phase out hypergolic propellants for its rocket fleet. The 10A will have a capability to low Earth orbit of at least 14 tonnes (31,000 lb) when the first stage is recovered and at least 18 tonnes (40,000 lb) when used in a completely expendable arrangement; it will use kerosene as fuel and liquid oxygen as the oxidizer. The rocket's first stage will have restartable engines and grid fins to enable reuse after stage recovery; first stage landing and recovery will employ "tethered landing devices" in lieu of landing legs; this tethered system involves the deployment of "hooks" by the stage which would be caught by a tensioned wire system on the ground. The first flight of the 10A is expected in 2026 with the test of China's Lanyue lunar lander.

=== Long March 10B variant ===
In December 2025, it was reported on Chinese social media that a representative from the commercial arm of CALT (Chinarocket Co., Ltd.) presented plans for a commercial variant of the Long March 10A during the Wenchang International Aviation and Aerospace Forum 2025. This new variant, the Long March 10B, will have a payload capacity of at least 16 tonnes (35,000 lb), likely in a reusable mode, to a 200-kilometre (120 mi) low Earth orbit, and at least 11 tonnes (24,000 lb) to a 900-kilometre (560 mi) orbit at 50 degrees orbital inclination.

The CZ-10B was first launched on 10 July 2026; the mission was successful. This launch also marked the first time that China successfully recovered a first-stage booster during an orbital mission.

=== Long March 10C variant ===
In July 2026, after the debut launch of the CZ-10B and the successful recovery of that rocket's first-stage, officials from Chinese space-sector confirmed that a "workhorse" commercial variant of the CZ-10 series will be developed. This new variant, the Long March 10C, will have a larger (methalox) first-stage than the first-stage of the CZ-10A/B while using the same second-stage as the CZ-10B; it will be an all-methalox launcher using the YF-219 engines for both stages. It likely will have a payload capacity in excess of 25 tonnes (55,000 lb) to LEO, exceeding that of the CZ-5B.

== History ==
=== Precursor design ===
An old proposal from 1992 for China's "project 921" envisioned the adoption of a modular design for a new generation of human-rated launch vehicles that would allow various payload combinations ranging from 11 to 70 tonnes (24,000 to 154,000 lb) to low Earth orbit. One such combination would have allowed China to pursue its own crewed lunar exploration program, including lunar orbit, circumlunar, and lunar landing missions. This proposal was not adopted. However, elements of this old proposal appear to have survived in the current Long March 10 designs.

=== Proposal and development ===
The China Aerospace Science and Technology Corporation (CASC) began preliminary research into a next-generation crew launch vehicle in 2017. That year, the first-stage YF-100K engine completed its first test firing. During 2018, CASC carried out three test firings of the YF-100M second-stage engine and displayed a model of the vehicle at the 12th Zhuhai Airshow.

In 2019, CASC reported the development of a 5-metre-diameter conical propellant tank structure with a claimed 15% reduction in weight and later announced completion of a 5-metre liquid oxygen-kerosene tank. A project titled 5-metre Diameter Module of the Next-Generation Crew Launch Vehicle – Overall Technology and Engineering Application passed an acceptance review organised by the China Manned Space Agency (CMSA). In 2020, a full-scale structural prototype of the thrust-transfer structure for the seven-engine first stage completed static load testing.

Testing of propulsion systems accelerated in 2022. CASC conducted the first long-duration ignition test and subsequent high-altitude testing of the YF-75E third-stage engine, while the YF-100M second-stage engine completed a series of firings using a titanium-alloy nozzle extension. By October 2022, cumulative testing of the YF-75E had exceeded 10,000 seconds. Later that year, the YF-100K first-stage engine completed a series of ignition and endurance tests intended to support reusable launch vehicle operations.

In February 2023, an exhibition at the National Museum of China revealed that the vehicle had been officially named Long March 10. During the year, testing continued on key components including the rocket's oxygen-delivery system, grid fins, and YF-100K engines. On 29 May 2023, CMSA announced the start of the crewed lunar landing phase of the Chinese Lunar Exploration Program, with Long March 10 designated as the programme's primary launch vehicle.

In April 2024, CMSA stated that development of the hardware required for China's crewed lunar programme, including the Long March 10, had largely been completed and that engine testing was continuing. Construction of launch facilities for the vehicle was also underway near the existing Wenchang Space Launch Site in Hainan. In June 2024, CASC conducted the first large-scale propulsion-system test of the vehicle, using three YF-100K engines operating simultaneously. A fairing-separation test followed in November 2024, and later that month the YF-100K completed its first orbital mission when four engines powered the maiden flight of the Long March 12.

During 2025, development entered an integrated testing phase. Structural qualification testing began in July, followed by a seven-engine static-fire test in August using a shortened first-stage test article at the under-construction Launch Complex 301 at Wenchang. A second hot-fire test took place in September and included multiple engine restarts intended to simulate launch, re-entry, and landing operations for a reusable first stage. In October, CMSA announced that the first orbital flight of the Mengzhou spacecraft was planned for 2026.

Long March 10A test stage (right), following activation of Mengzhou's launch escape system (left) at max q, 11 February 2026

The programme's first flight test occurred on 11 February 2026, when a Long March 10A test stage carrying a Mengzhou crew module was launched on a suborbital mission to evaluate the spacecraft's launch escape system under conditions of maximum dynamic pressure. Following separation of the crew module, the booster continued a test profile intended to simulate first-stage recovery operations, including attitude-control manoeuvres, engine relights, powered deceleration, and a controlled descent. The stage ultimately splashed down approximately 200 metres from its recovery vessel after a flight lasting about 470 seconds.

The Long March 10B made its maiden flight from Launch Complex 2 at the Hainan Commercial Space Launch Site on July 10 2026. During the mission, the rocket's first stage was successfully recovered using a sea-based net platform, and the launch mission was completed successfully. The mission marked China's first successful controlled recovery of an orbital launch vehicle first stage and the world's first successful net recovery.

== Launches ==
=== CZ-10 and CZ-10A ===
Flight	Version	Launch (UTC)	Payload	Orbit	Launch site	Outcome	Booster recovery
Test	CZ‑10A	11 February 2026, 03:00	Mengzhou abort capsule	Suborbital	Wenchang, LC‑301	Success	Controlled (South China Sea)
Test	First launch of the Long March 10 series. Mengzhou capsule performed an in flight abort at max q, with the first stage continuing to space, reaching an altitude of 105 km (65 mi) before performing a successful splashdown in the South China Sea.						
10A‑Y1	CZ-10A	Q1 2027	Mengzhou 1	LEO (CSS)	Wenchang, LC‑301	Planned	TBA
10A‑Y1	First orbital flight of CZ-10/CZ-10A. Uncrewed Mengzhou test flight to low Earth orbit and the Tiangong space station (CSS).						
10‑Y1	CZ-10	2027	Mengzhou	TLI	Wenchang, LC‑301	Planned	TBA
10‑Y1	Uncrewed Mengzhou test flight to the Moon.						
10‑Y2	CZ-10	2028	Lanyue	TLI	Wenchang, LC‑301	Planned	TBA
10‑Y2	The Lanyue will complete lunar orbit docking with Y3's crewed Mengzhou and conduct a lunar landing dress rehearsal.						
10‑Y3	CZ-10	2028	Mengzhou	TLI	Wenchang, LC‑301	Planned	TBA
10‑Y3	The Mengzhou will complete lunar orbit docking with Y2's Lanyue lander.						
10‑Y4	CZ-10	2029	Lanyue	TLI	Wenchang, LC‑301	Planned	TBA
10‑Y4	The Lanyue will complete lunar orbit docking with Y5's crewed Mengzhou and conduct a crewed lunar landing.						
10‑Y5	CZ-10	2029	Mengzhou	TLI	Wenchang, LC‑301	Planned	TBA
10‑Y5	The Mengzhou will complete lunar orbit docking with Y4's Lanyue lander.						

== See also ==
- China National Space Administration – National space agency of the People's Republic of China
- List of Long March launches (2025-2029)
- Comparison of orbital launchers families
- Comparison of orbital launch systems
- Space program of China
