= Wenchang Space Launch Site =

Launch site

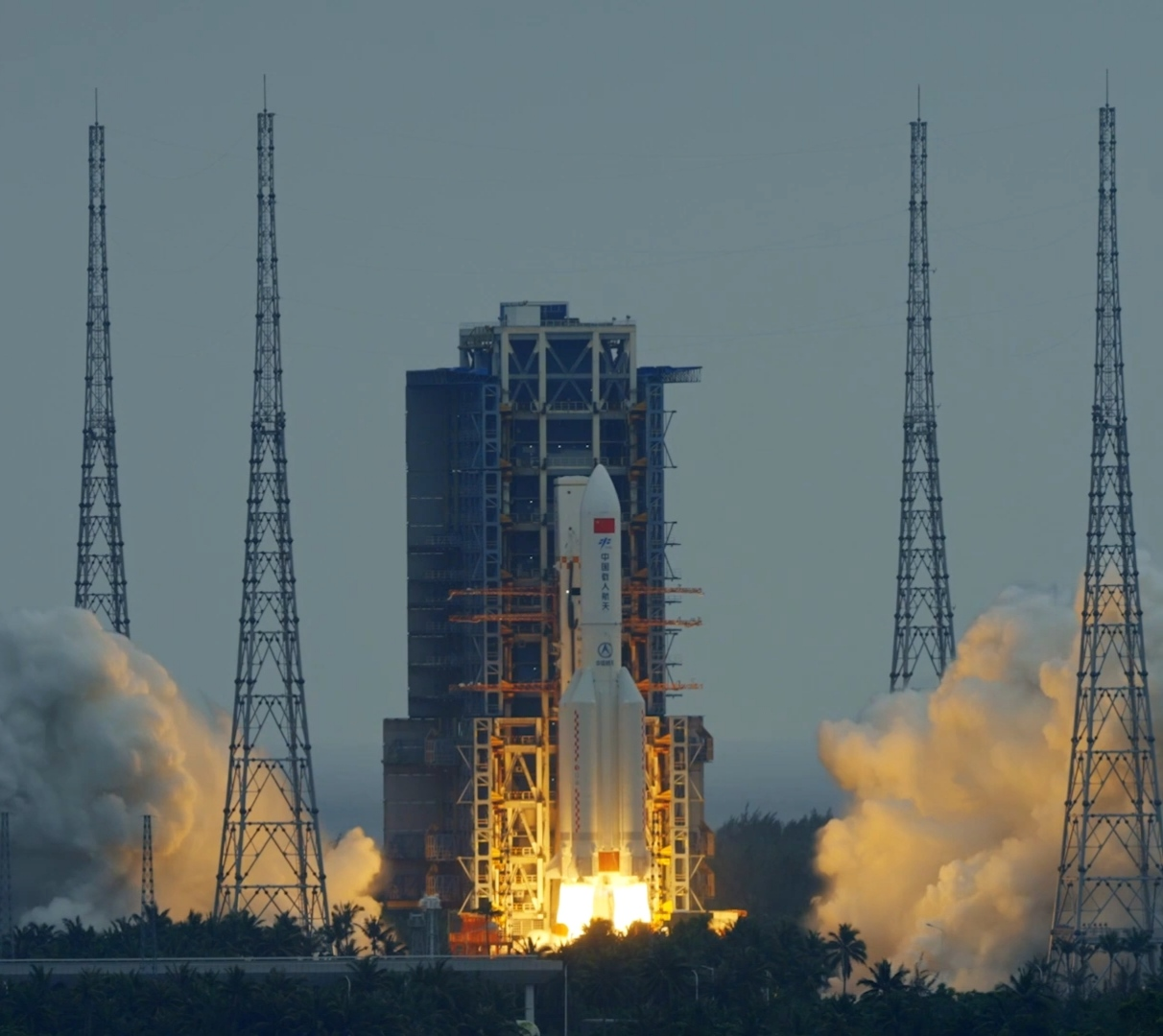
- A Long March 5 lifts off from Wenchang Launch Complex 101 carrying the Tianhe core module of the Tiangong space station, April 2021
- Interactive map of Wenchang Space Launch Site
- Location: Wenchang, Hainan, China
- Coordinates: 19°36′52.17″N 110°57′4.08″E
- Operator: China Aerospace Science and Technology Corporation
- Total launches: 52
- Launch pad: 3
Launch Complex 101 launch history
- Status: Active
- Launches: 18
- First launch: 3 November 2016; Long March 5
- Last launch: 11 June 2026; Long March 5 / TJS-25
- Associated rockets: Long March 5 Long March 5B
Launch Complex 201 launch history
- Status: Active
- Launches: 33
- First launch: 25 June 2016; Long March 7 / YZ-1A
- Last launch: 10 August 2026; Long March 7A / ChinaSat-4B
- Associated rockets: Long March 7 Long March 7A; Long March 8 Long March 8A
Launch Complex 301 launch history
- Status: Active
- Launches: 1
- First launch: 11 February 2026; Long March 10A / Mengzhou abort capsule
- Associated rockets: Long March 10; Long March 10A; Long March 10B

Wenchang Space Launch Site
- Simplified Chinese: 文昌航天发射场
- Traditional Chinese: 文昌航天發射場
Transcriptions
Standard Mandarin
- Hanyu Pinyin: Wénchāng Hángtiān Fāshè Chǎng

The Wenchang Space Launch Site (Chinese: 文昌航天发射场) is a rocket launch site located in Wenchang on the island of Hainan, in China.

Formally a suborbital test center, it currently serves as China's southernmost spaceport. The site was selected for its low latitude, 19° north of the equator, allowing for larger payloads to be launched. Unlike launch facilities on the mainland, Wenchang uses its seaport for deliveries. It is the only launch site of the Long March 5, the heaviest Chinese rocket, which launched all three modules of the Tiangong space station. It is also the only launch site of the Long March 7, carrying the Tianzhou cargo craft to resupply the station. The site is expected to become the center of the China Manned Space Program, as the Shenzhou craft, launched from Jiuquan Satellite Launch Center, is retired in favor of the Mengzhou craft and lunar-capable Long March 10 under development at Wenchang.

The construction of the site was complete by October 2014. The first launch took place on 25 June 2016. Due to construction delays, the initial launch of the CZ-5 booster from Wenchang, originally expected to start in 2014 was postponed and took place on 3 November 2016. The CZ-5B (maximum payload to LEO) variant was expected to be completed circa 2018 but the maiden flight took place on 5 May 2020. A CZ-5 carrier rocket was already shipped from North China's Tianjin port on 20 September 2015 for rehearsal drills of a scheduled Chang'e-5 lunar mission, which was planned for around 2019 and was successfully launched on 23 November 2020.

== Reasons for selection ==
=== Location ===
At 19 degrees north latitude, the Wenchang Space Launch Site is located on the Chinese island of Hainan, which is the nearest to the equator among Chinese territories. Low-latitude locations are desirable for space launch sites due to the higher speed of rotation closer to the equator, as well as the smaller inclination change maneuver needed to reach geosynchronous orbit. Hainan also has a large range of allowable launch azimuths, facilitating the launch of payloads to orbital inclinations between 90 and 175 degrees.

The launch site is considered to have favorable conditions for long-term development and international collaboration, thanks to its potential for expansion, low operational expenses, and relatively lenient regulatory framework. Rockets launched from Hainan Island are within 10 kilometres (6.2 mi) of the ocean in the direction of launch, and their trajectory takes them over the open ocean. This makes falling rocket debris less likely to cause accidents and destroy property.

=== Economic potential ===
Wenchang Space Launch Site is in the northeast coastal section of Dongjiao Town, Wenchang City, with a coastline of roughly 4,100 meters and an area of 7,336 acres, starting from the control area of the space launch site in the north. The project is designed to include a theme park area, a central lake area (commercial and leisure function), and an ecological coconut forest region (holiday and residential function), with a total construction land area of 6,046 acres. Hainan, as a tourist destination in China with many tourism resources is predicted to grow. This space launch site was included in Hainan Province's 11th Five-Year Plan in 2010.

== Planning and construction ==
During the Cold War the location was considered vulnerable to foreign military forces. After the Cold War ended, development plans were renewed. The construction of the new Wenchang Space Launch Center was officially approved by the State Council and the Central Military Commission of the People's Republic of China on 22 September 2007.

In late October 2007, the Mayor of Wenchang announced the appropriation of 1,200 hectares (3,000 acres) of land for the center and the necessary relocation of more than 6,000 people, mostly from the villages of Longlou (龙楼, 19.652°N 110.963°E) and Dongjiao (东郊, 19.567°N 110.867°E).

A November 2007 article indicated that the actual launch site would be near Longlou, while a space-science theme park would be built near Dongjiao. Satellite photography taken during April 2011 shows a clearing 19.6139°N 110.9513°E near the beach, likely for the CZ-5 launch pad.

== Launch pads ==
Wenchang has three launch pads:

- LC-101 – for CZ-5 launches, includes a fixed service structure and launch gantry, and is located at 19°36′52.17″N 110°57′4.08″E.
- LC-201 – for CZ-7 launches (and also compatible with CZ-8), includes a service structure and launch gantry, and is located at 19.61836°N 110.95574°E.
- LC-301 – for CZ-10 launches, includes a service structure and launch gantry.
Wenchang launch pads

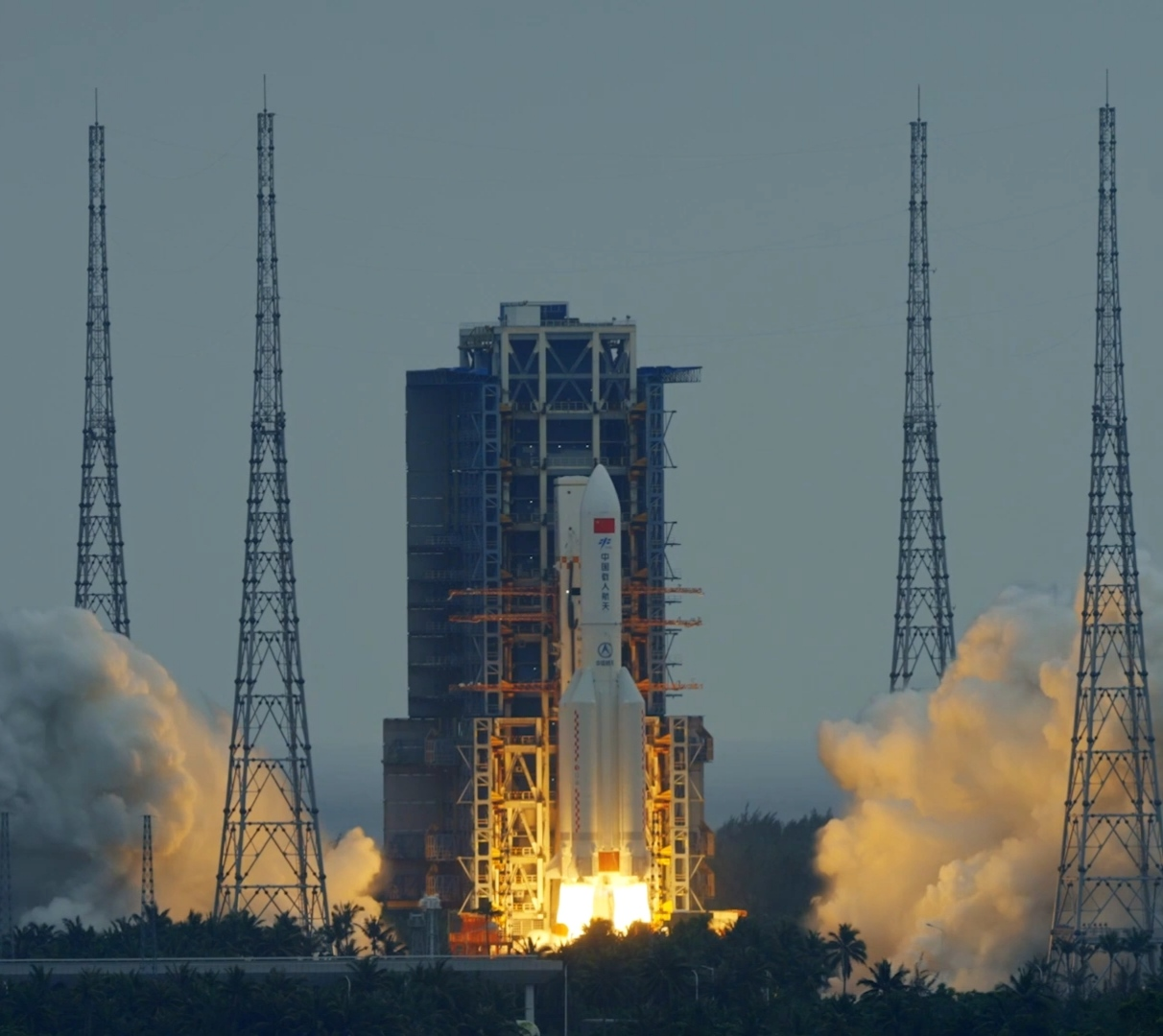
CZ-5 launch, LC-101

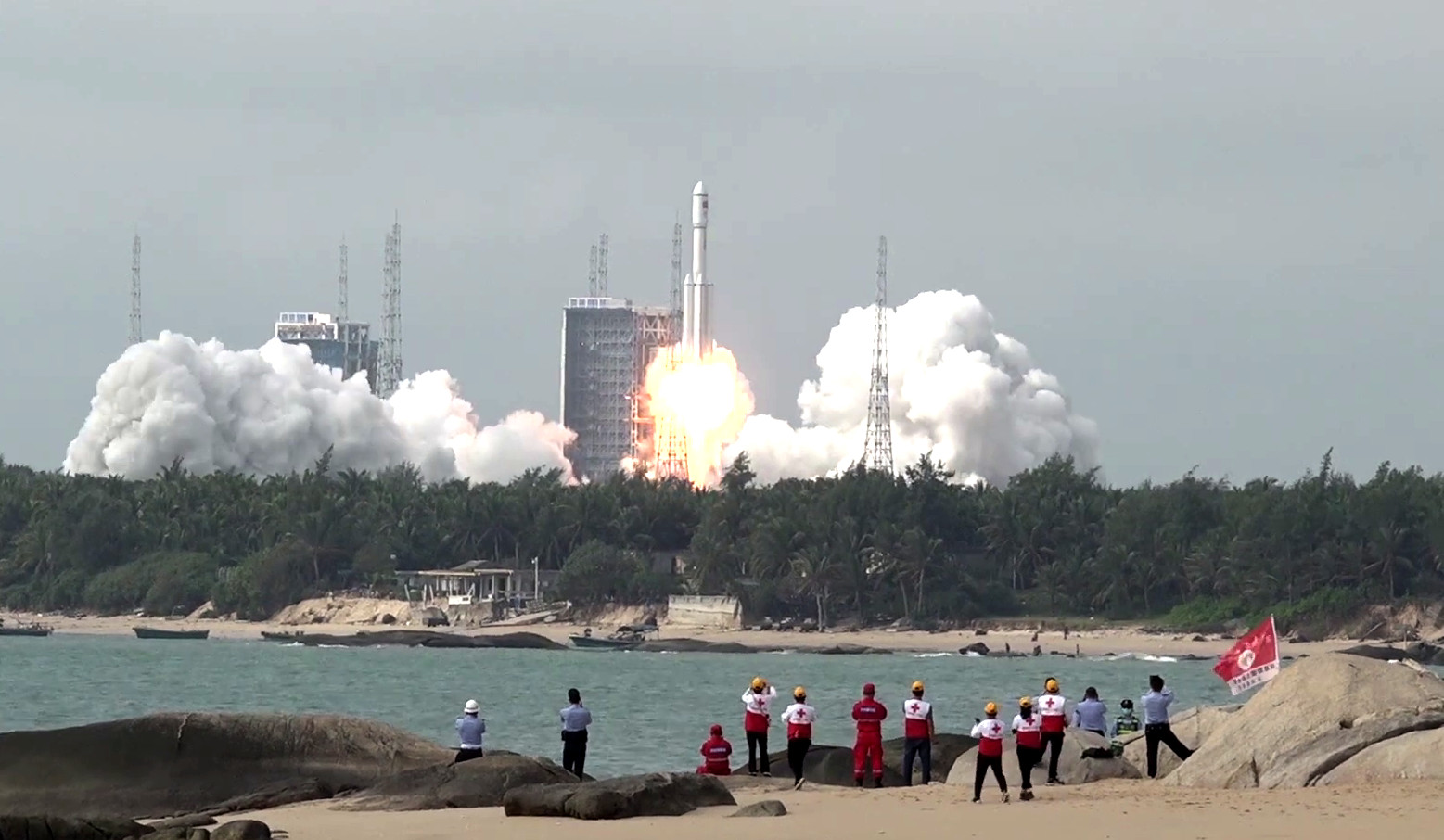
CZ-7 launch, LC-201

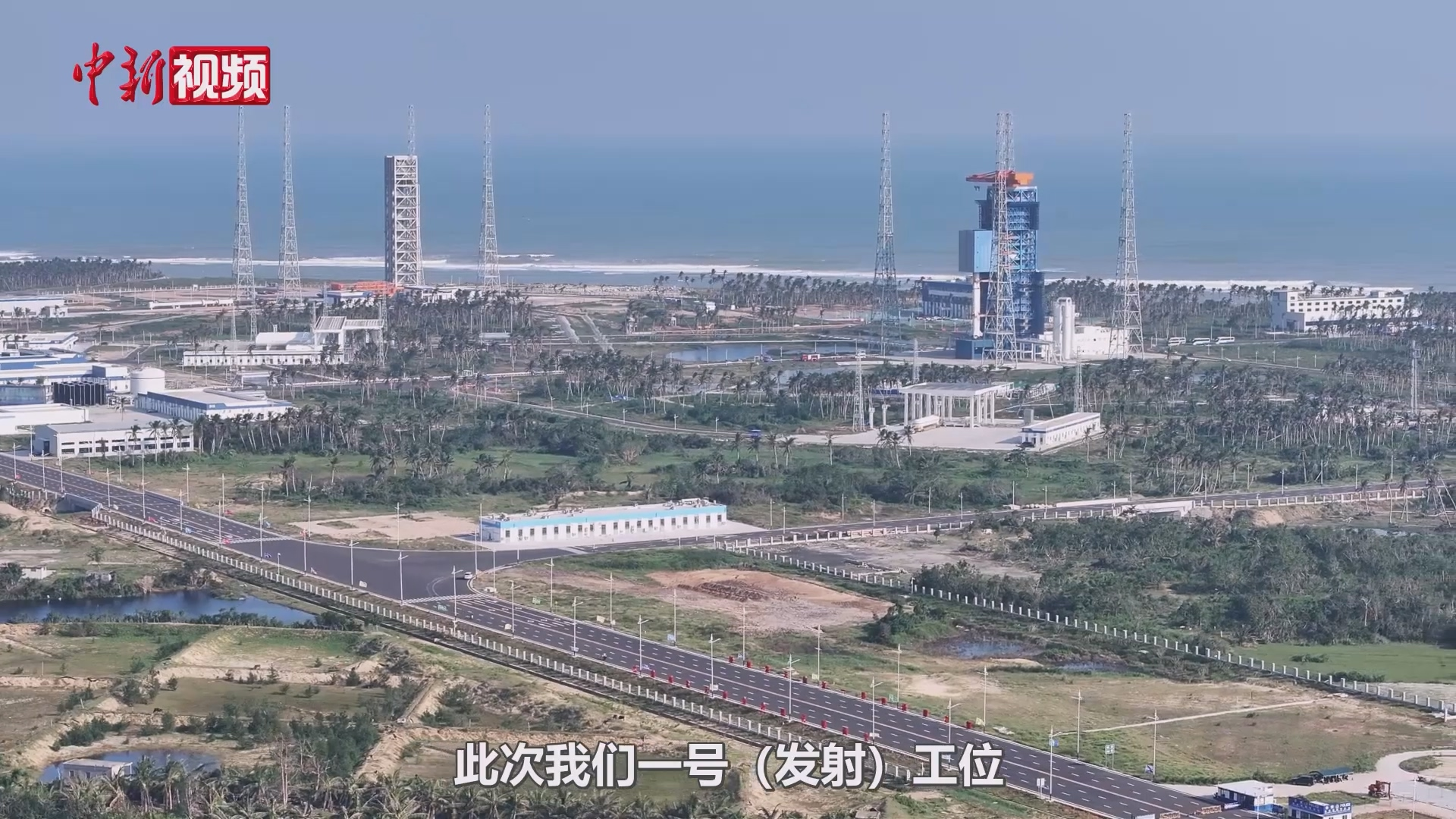
Launch pads 1 and 2

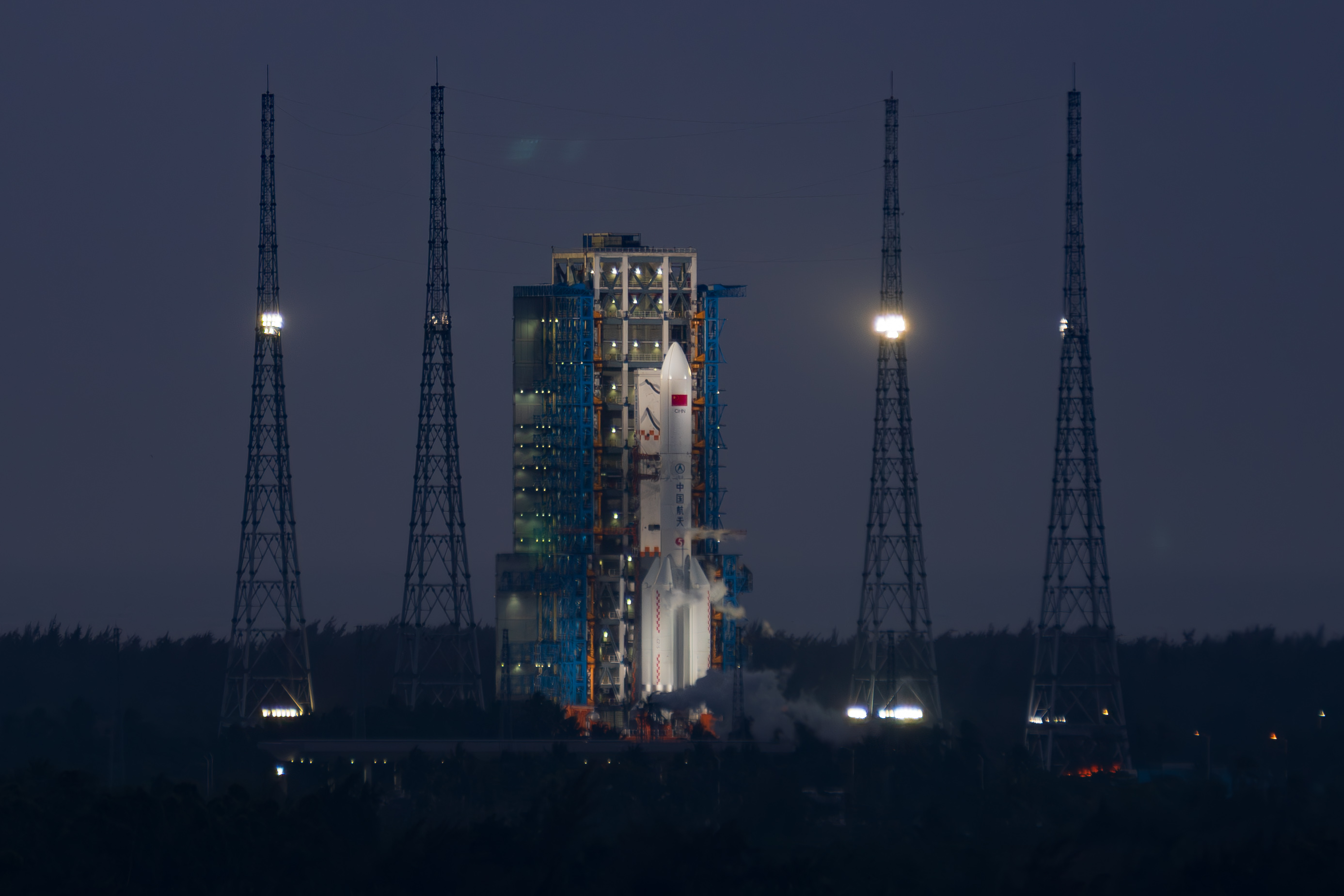
CZ-5 in February 2024, prior to launching TJS-11

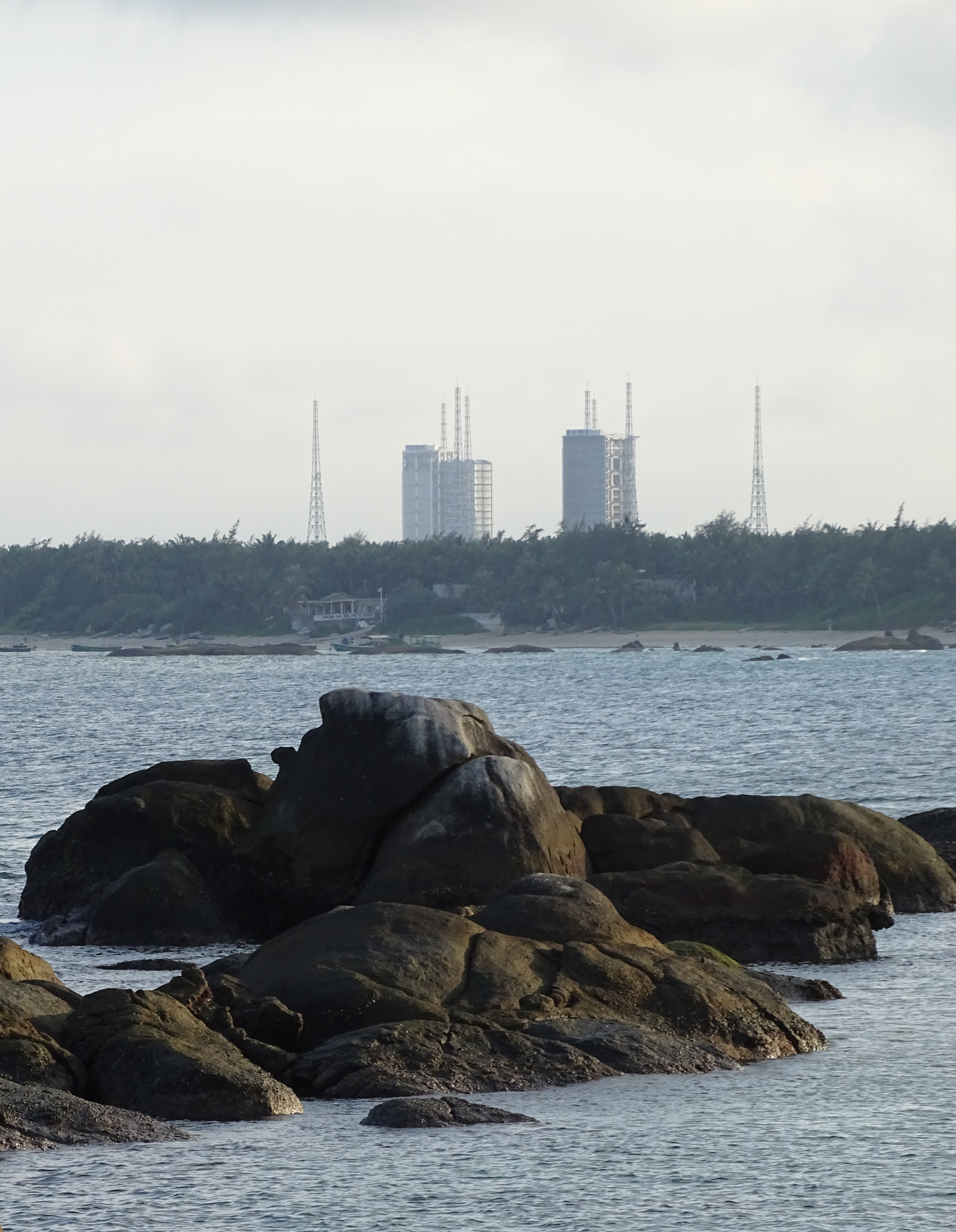
Seen from outside the site

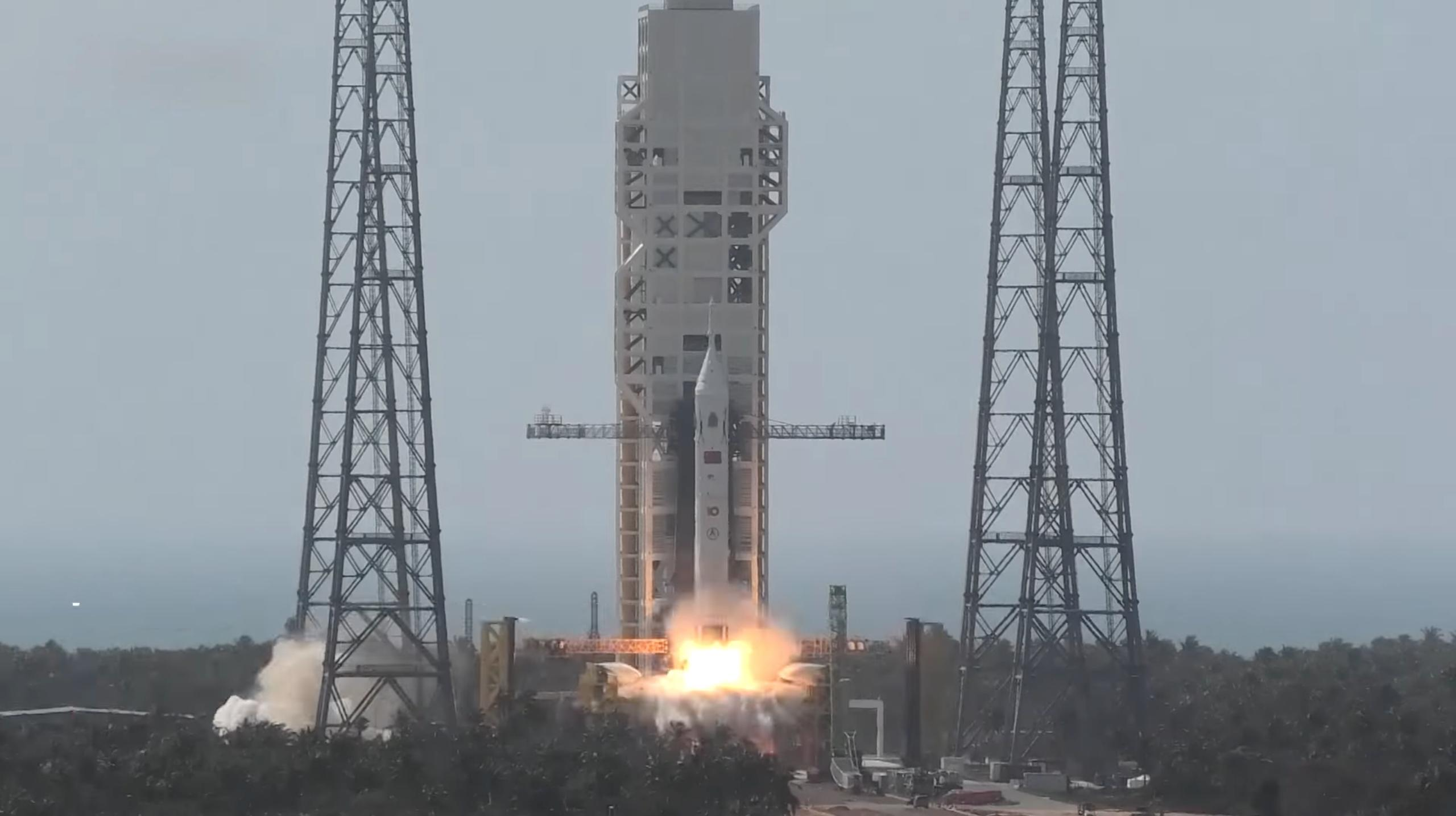
Test launch of CZ-10 stage with Mengzhou capsule, February 2026

== Launch statistics ==
=== Rocket configurations ===
The rocket configurations launched each year on either LC-1 or LC-2 :

- CZ-5
- CZ-5B
- CZ-7
- CZ-7A
- CZ-8 core only
- CZ-8 standard
- CZ-8A

== Launch history ==
=== Previous launches ===
Date (UTC)	Vehicle	Serial number	Launch Pad	Payload	Outcome	Notes
25 July 2016,	Long March 7/YZ-1A	Y1	LC-2	DFFC, Aolong 1, Aoxiang Zhixing, Tiange Feixingqi 1 & 2	Success	zh:长征七号首飞
3 November 2016,	Long March 5/YZ-2	Y1	LC-1	Shijian-17	Success	
20 April 2017,	Long March 7	Y2	LC-2	Tianzhou 1	Success	
2 July 2017	Long March 5	Y2	LC-1	Shijian 18	Failure	
27 December 2019	Long March 5	Y3	LC-1	Shijian 20	Success	
16 March 2020	Long March 7A	Y1	LC-2	XJY-6	Failure	
5 May 2020	Long March 5B	Y1	LC-1	Mengzhou (Prototype)	Success	zh:长征五号B首飞
23 July 2020	Long March 5	Y4	LC-1	Tianwen 1	Success	
24 November 2020	Long March 5	Y5	LC-1	Chang'e 5	Success	
22 December 2020	Long March 8	Y1	LC-2	XJY-7, Haisi-1, Tianqi-8, Zinxing-1A & Yuanguang	Success	
11 March 2021	Long March 7A	Y2	LC-2	Shiyan 9	Success	
29 April 2021	Long March 5B	Y2	LC-1	Tianhe	Success	
29 May 2021	Long March 7	Y3	LC-2	Tianzhou 2	Success	
20 September 2021	Long March 7	Y4	LC-2	Tianzhou 3	Success	
23 December 2021	Long March 7A	Y3	LC-2	Shiyan-12 01 & 02	Success	
27 February 2022	Long March 8	Y2	LC-2	Tianxian, Hainan-1 & Jilin-1 Gaofen-03D	Success	
9 May 2022	Long March 7	Y5	LC-2	Tianzhou 4	Success	
24 July 2022	Long March 5B	Y3	LC-1	Wentian	Success	
13 September 2022	Long March 7A	Y5	LC-2	ChinaSat 1E	Success	
31 October 2022	Long March 5B	Y4	LC-1	Mengtian	Success	
12 November 2022	Long March 7	Y6	LC-2	Tianzhou 5	Success	
9 January 2023	Long March 7A	Y4	LC-2	Shijian-23	Success	
10 May 2023	Long March 7	Y7	LC-2	Tianzhou 6	Success	
2 November 2023	Long March 7A	Y6	LC-2	TJS-10	Success	
15 December 2023	Long March 5	Y6	LC-1	Yaogan 41	Success	
17 January 2024	Long March 7	Y8	LC-2	Tianzhou 7	Success	
23 February 2024	Long March 5	Y7	LC-1	TJS-11	Success	
20 March 2024	Long March 8	Y3	LC-2	Queqiuo 2, Tiandu-1&2	Success	
3 May 2024	Long March 5	Y8	LC-1	Chang'e 6	Success	
29 June 2024	Long March 7A	Y8	LC-2	ChinaSat 3A	Success	
22 August 2024	Long March 7A	Y9	LC-2	ChinaSat 4A	Success	
15 November 2024	Long March 7	Y9	LC-2	Tianzhou 8	Success	
16 December 2024	Long March 5B/YZ-2	Y6	LC-1	Guowang × 10 (SatNet LEO Group 01)	Success	
11 February 2025	Long March 8A	Y1	LC-2	Guowang × 9 (SatNet LEO Group 02)	Success	
29 March 2025	Long March 7A	Y11	LC-2	TJS-16	Success	
29 April 2025	Long March 5B/YZ-2	Y7	LC-1	Guowang × 10 (SatNet LEO Group 03)	Success	
20 May 2025	Long March 7A	Y15	LC-2	ChinaSat 3B	Success	
15 July 2025	Long March 7	Y10	LC-2	Tianzhou 9	Success	
13 August 2025	Long March 5B/YZ-2	Y8	LC-1	Guowang × 10 (SatNet LEO Group 08)	Success	
9 September 2025	Long March 7A	Y14	LC-2	Yaogan 45	Success	
23 October 2025	Long March 5	Y9	LC-1	TJS-20	Success	
3 November 2025	Long March 7A	Y13	LC-2	Yaogan 46	Success	
30 November 2025	Long March 7A	Y10	LC-2	Shijian 28	Success	
20 December 2025	Long March 5	Y10	LC-1	TJS-23	Success	
30 December 2025	Long March 7A	Y7	LC-2	Shijian 29 A & B	Success	
11 February 2026	Long March 10A	Test Stage	LC-3	Mengzhou	Success	zh:长征十号低空演示验证与梦舟飞船最大动压逃逸飞行试验
11 May 2026	Long March 7	Y11	LC-2	Tianzhou 10	Success	
26 May 2026	Long March 7A	Y12	LC-2	TJS-24	Success	
11 June 2026	Long March 5	Y11	LC-1	TJS-25	Success	
23 June 2026	Long March 7A	Y20	LC-2	TJS-26A	Success	
29 July 2026	Long March 7A	Y29	LC-2	Tianlian 3-01	Success	
10 August 2026	Long March 7A	Y16	LC-2	ChinaSat-4B	Failure	

=== Next launches ===
Date (UTC)	Vehicle	Serial number	Launch Pad	Payload	Outcome	Notes
2026	Long March 5	Y	LC-1	Chang'e 7	Planned	
2027	Long March 5	Y	LC-1	Xuntian	Planned	
2028	Long March 5	Y	LC-1	Tianwen 3	Planned	
2029	Long March 5	Y	LC-1	Chang'e 8	Planned	
2030	Long March 5	Y	LC-1	Tianwen-4	Planned	

The first launch was a Long March 7 which took place successfully on 25 June 2016.

On 3 November 2016, the Long March 5 rocket made its maiden flight from the launch site.

On 2 July 2017, a Long March 5 launch failed to complete its mission to put a seven ton Shijian-18 communications satellite into orbit.

The third flight of Long March 5 occurred on 27 December 2019 from Wenchang LC-1.

The maiden flight of the Long March 5B variant took place on 5 May 2020 from Wenchang LC-1.

On 23 July 2020, the fourth flight of Long March 5 put China's first indigenous Mars orbiter/rover Tianwen-1 directly into TMI from Wenchang.

The maiden flight of Long March 8 occurred on 22 December 2020 from Wenchang LC-2.

On 29 April 2021, the core module Tianhe of the China Space Station was successfully launched aboard a Long March 5B rocket from Wenchang LC-1.

On 29 May 2021, a cargo resupply ship named Tianzhou-2 launched on a Long March 7 (Y3) rocket from LC-2 to rendezvous with the China Space Station as preparation for the upcoming Shenzhou-12 crewed mission.

Launches from Wenchang

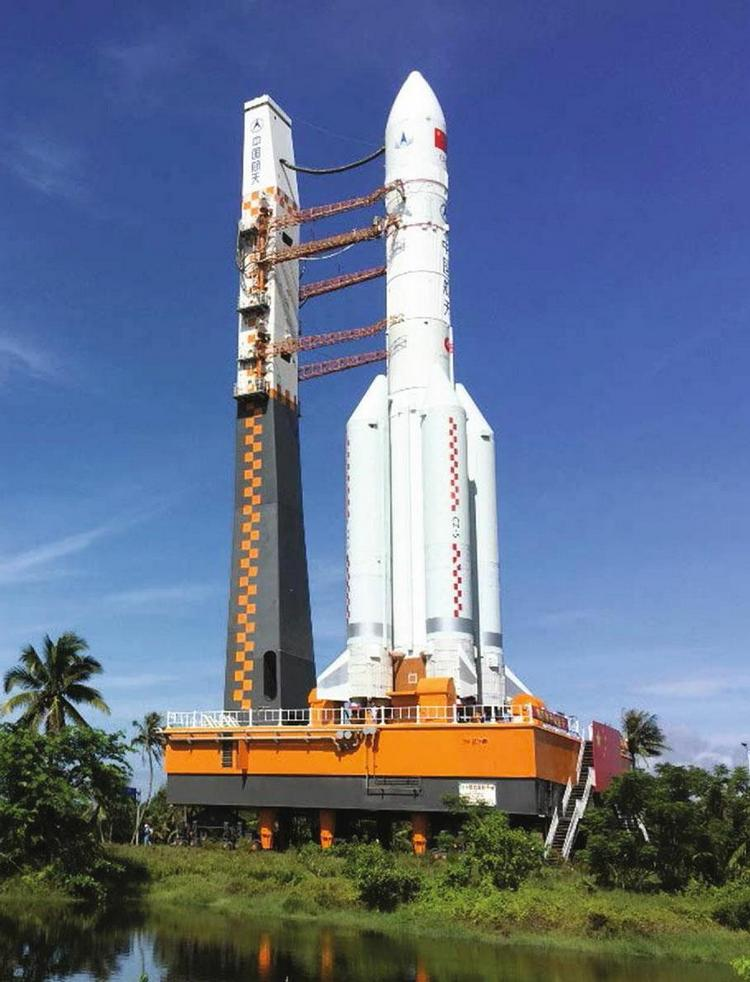
CZ-5 (Y1) rollout, October 2016

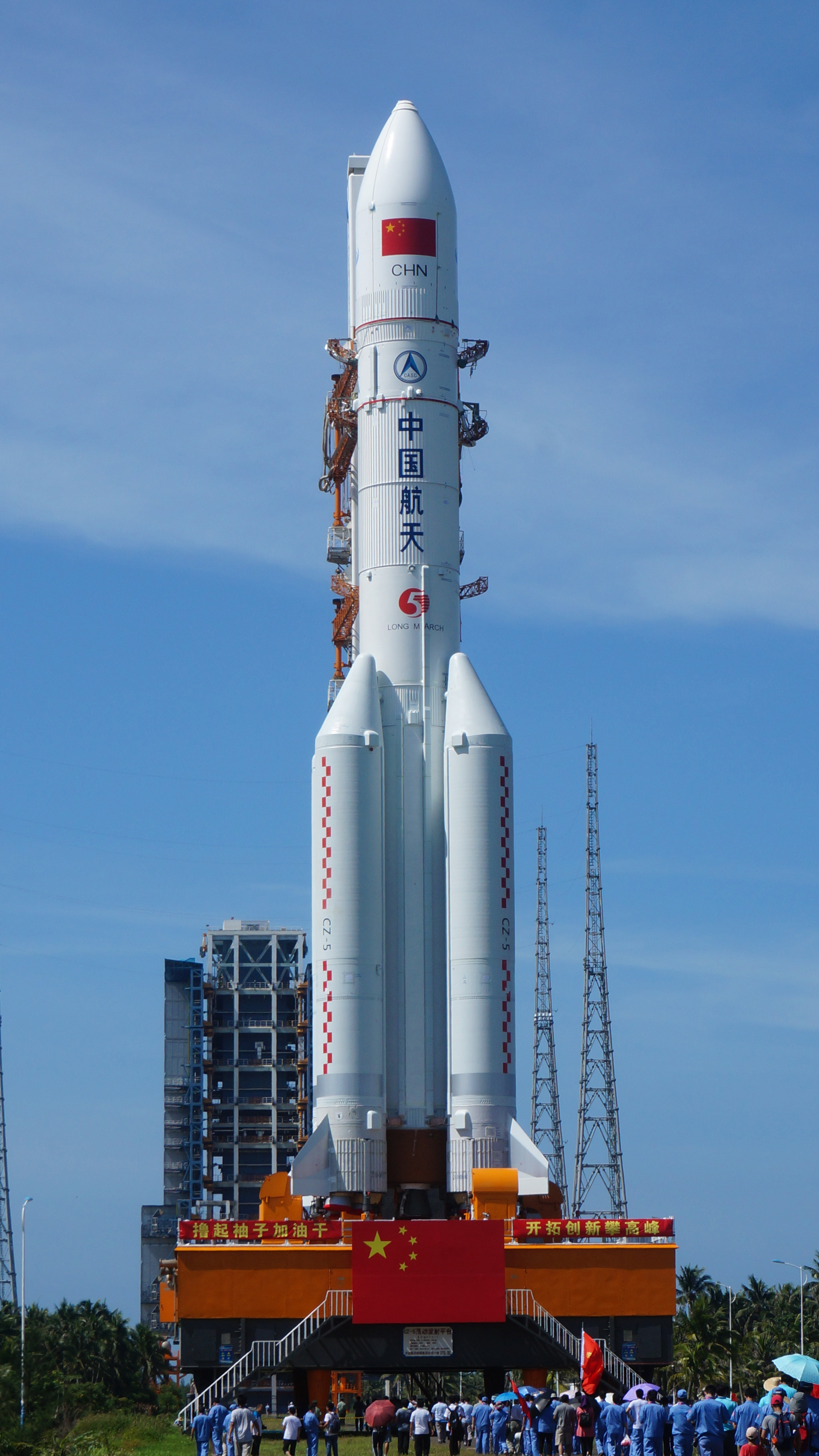
CZ-5 (Y2) rollout, 2017

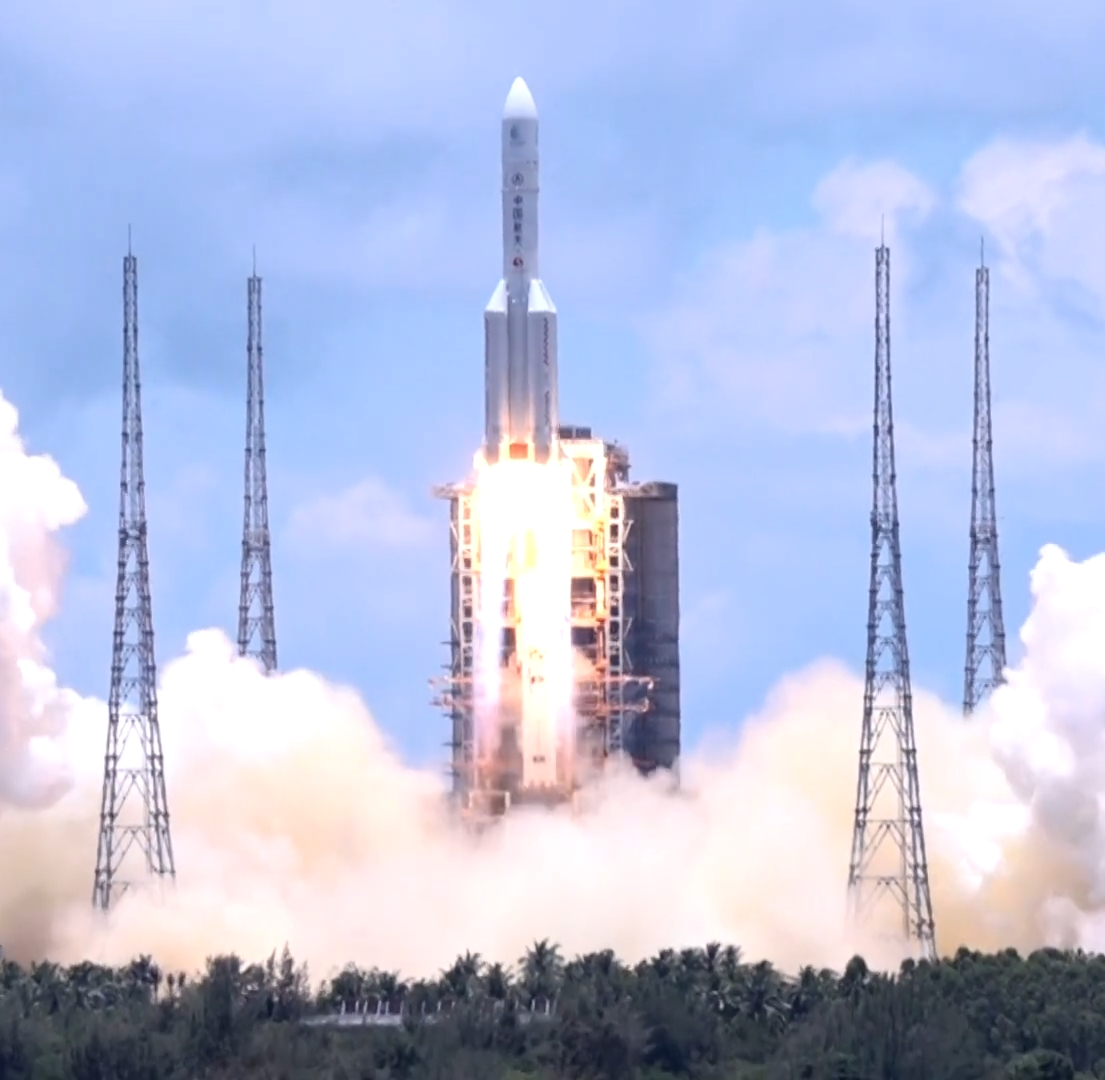
Tianwen-1 launch, CZ-5 (Y4), 23 July 2020

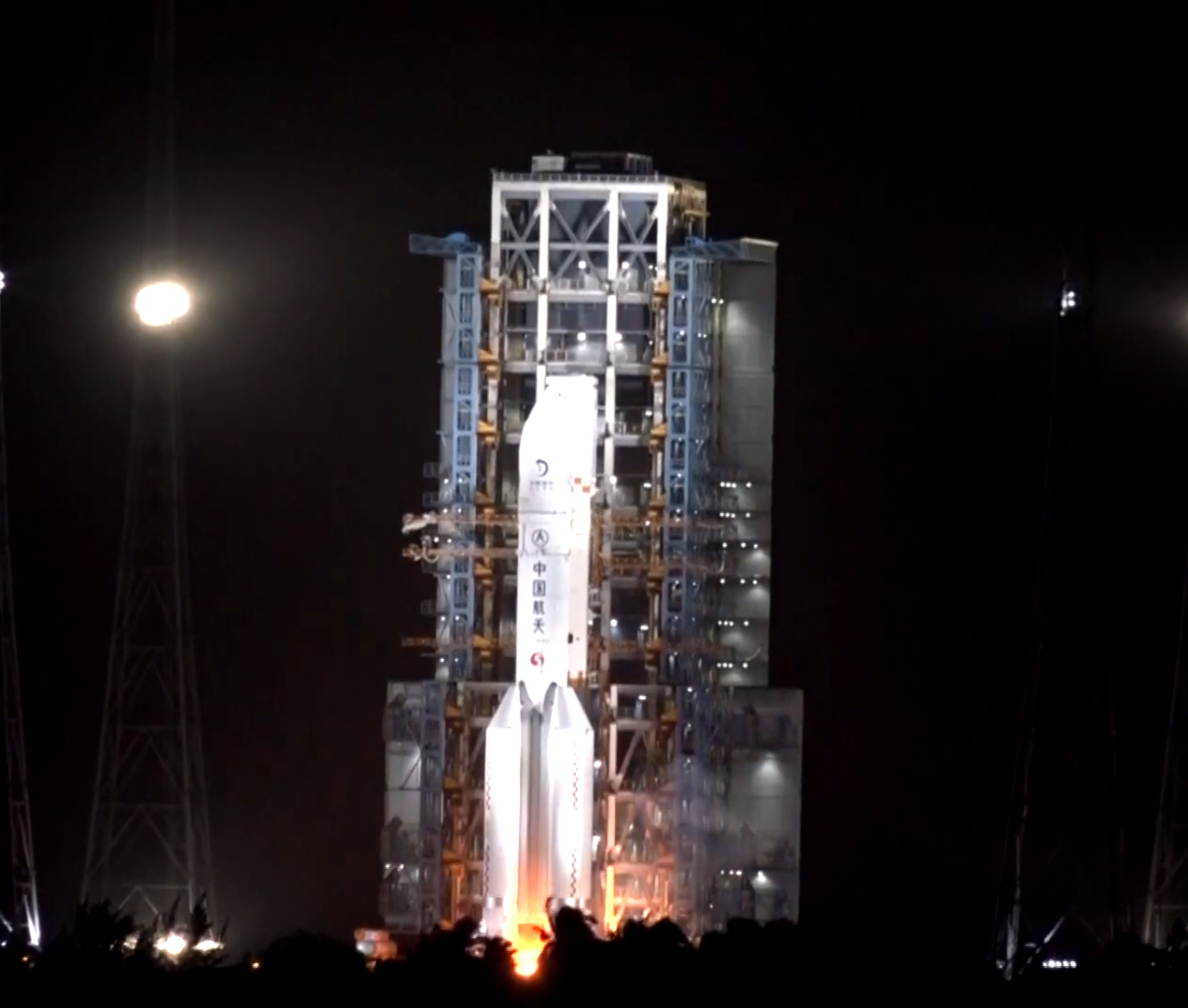
Chang'e 5 launch, CZ-5 (Y5), 23 November 2020

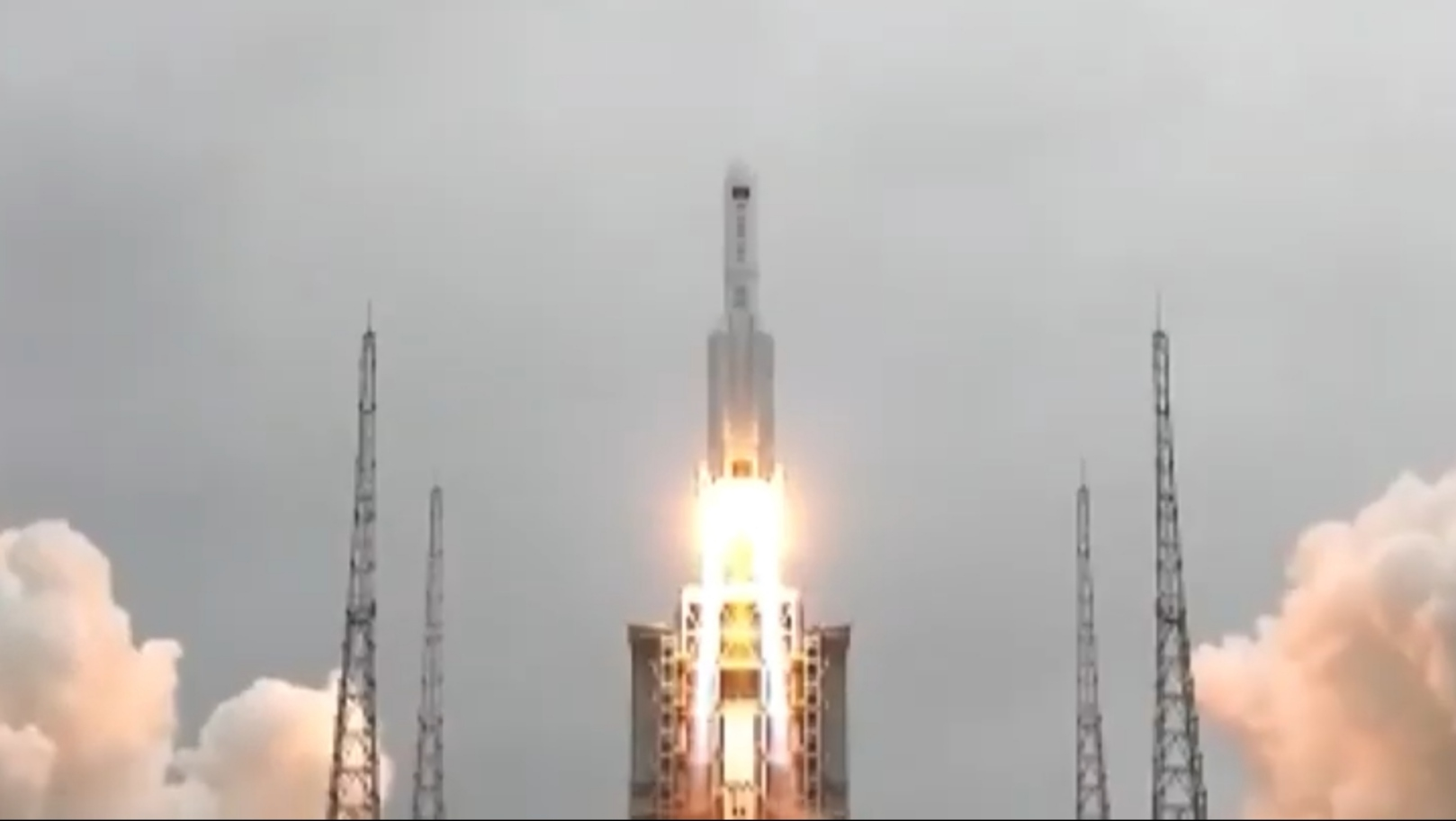
Tianhe launch, CZ-5B (Y2), 29 April 2021

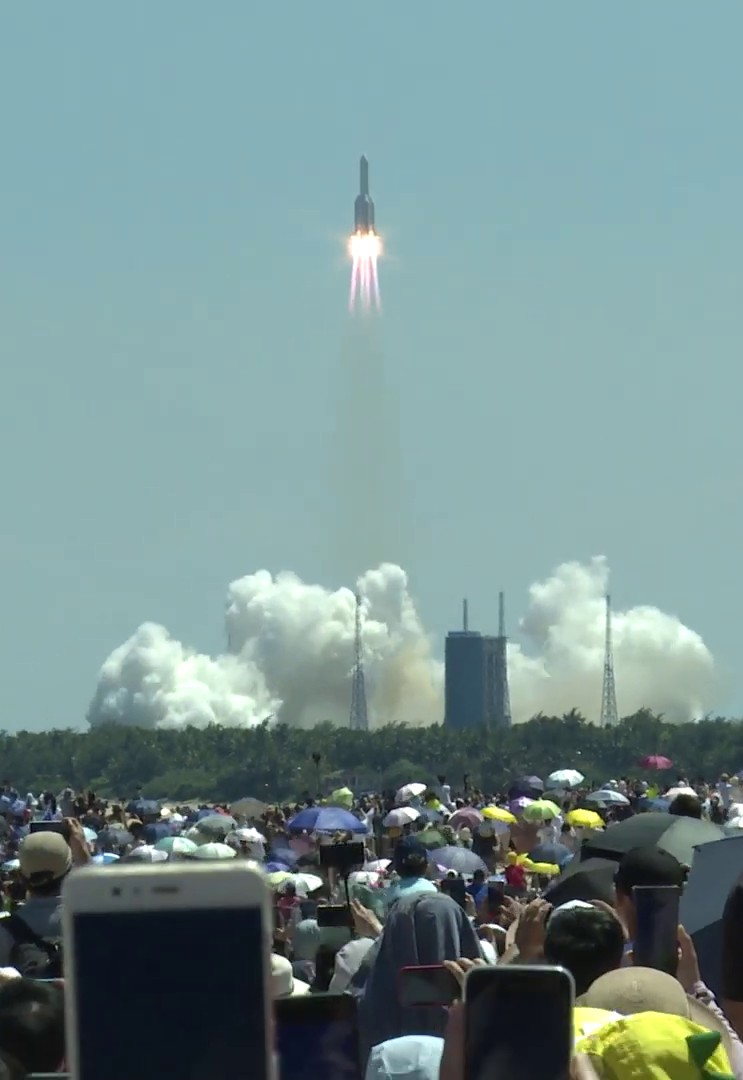
Wentian launch, CZ-5B (Y3), 24 July 2022

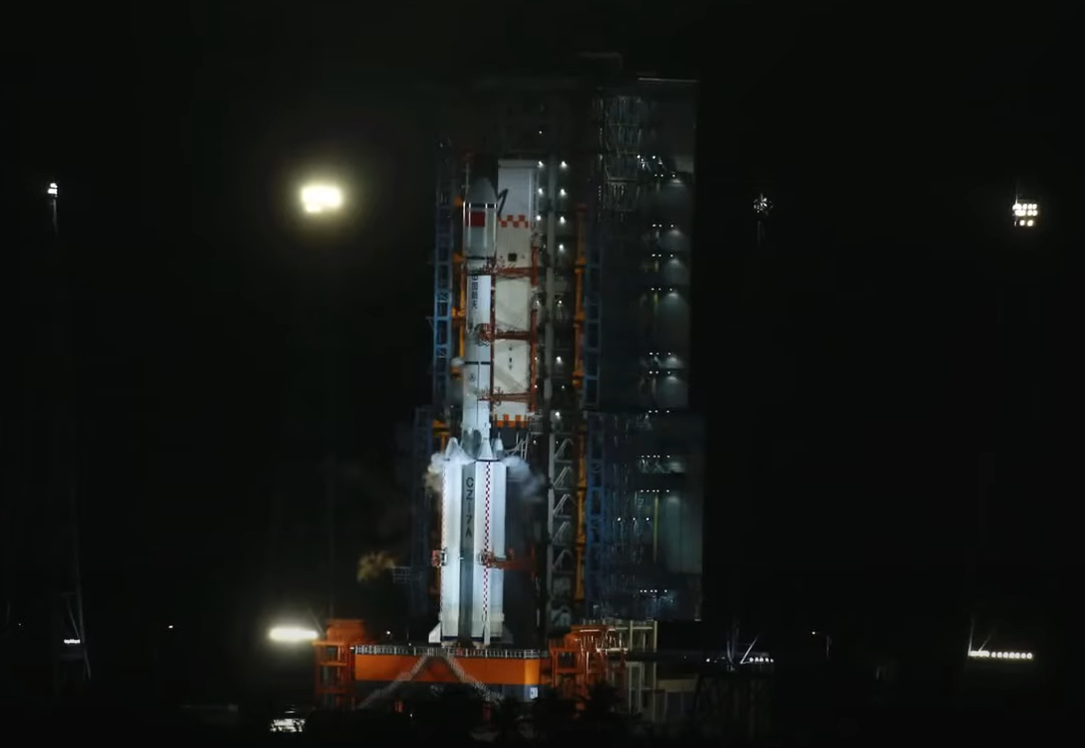
Shijian-23 launch, CZ-7A (Y4), 9 January 2023

== See also ==
- Chinese space program
- Jiuquan Satellite Launch Center – Chinese launch site
- Taiyuan Satellite Launch Center – Launch site in Shanxi, China
- Xichang Satellite Launch Center – Chinese satellite launch facility
- Wenchang Commercial Space Launch Site – Chinese spaceport company
