= Shenzhou 14 =

2022 Chinese crewed spaceflight to the Tiangong Space Station

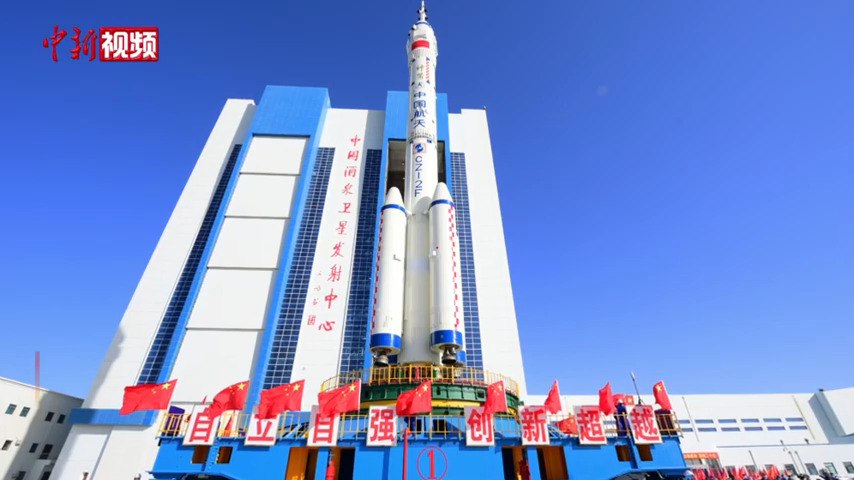
- Rollout of Shenzhou 14 atop a Long March 2F/G
- Mission type: Tiangong space station crew transport
- Operator: China Manned Space Agency
- COSPAR ID: 2022-060A
- SATCAT no.: 52797
- Mission duration: 182 days, 9 hours, 25 minutes

Spacecraft properties
- Spacecraft type: Shenzhou
- Manufacturer: China Aerospace Science and Technology Corporation

Crew
- Crew size: 3
- Members: Chen Dong; Liu Yang; Cai Xuzhe
- EVAs: 3
- EVA duration: 15 hours, 53 minutes

Start of mission
- Launch date: 5 June 2022, 02:44:10 UTC (10:44:10 CST)
- Rocket: Long March 2F/G (Y14)
- Launch site: Jiuquan, LA-4/SLS-1
- Contractor: China Academy of Launch Vehicle Technology

End of mission
- Landing date: 4 December 2022, 12:09:29 UTC
- Landing site: Inner Mongolia (41°39′13″N 100°03′11″E)

Orbital parameters
- Reference system: Geocentric orbit
- Regime: Low Earth orbit
- Perigee altitude: 386 km (240 mi)
- Apogee altitude: 380 km (240 mi)
- Inclination: 41.46°

Docking with Tiangong space station
- Docking port: Tianhe nadir
- Docking date: 5 June 2022, 09:42 UTC
- Undocking date: 4 December 2022, 03:01 UTC
- Time docked: 181 days, 17 hours, 19 minutes
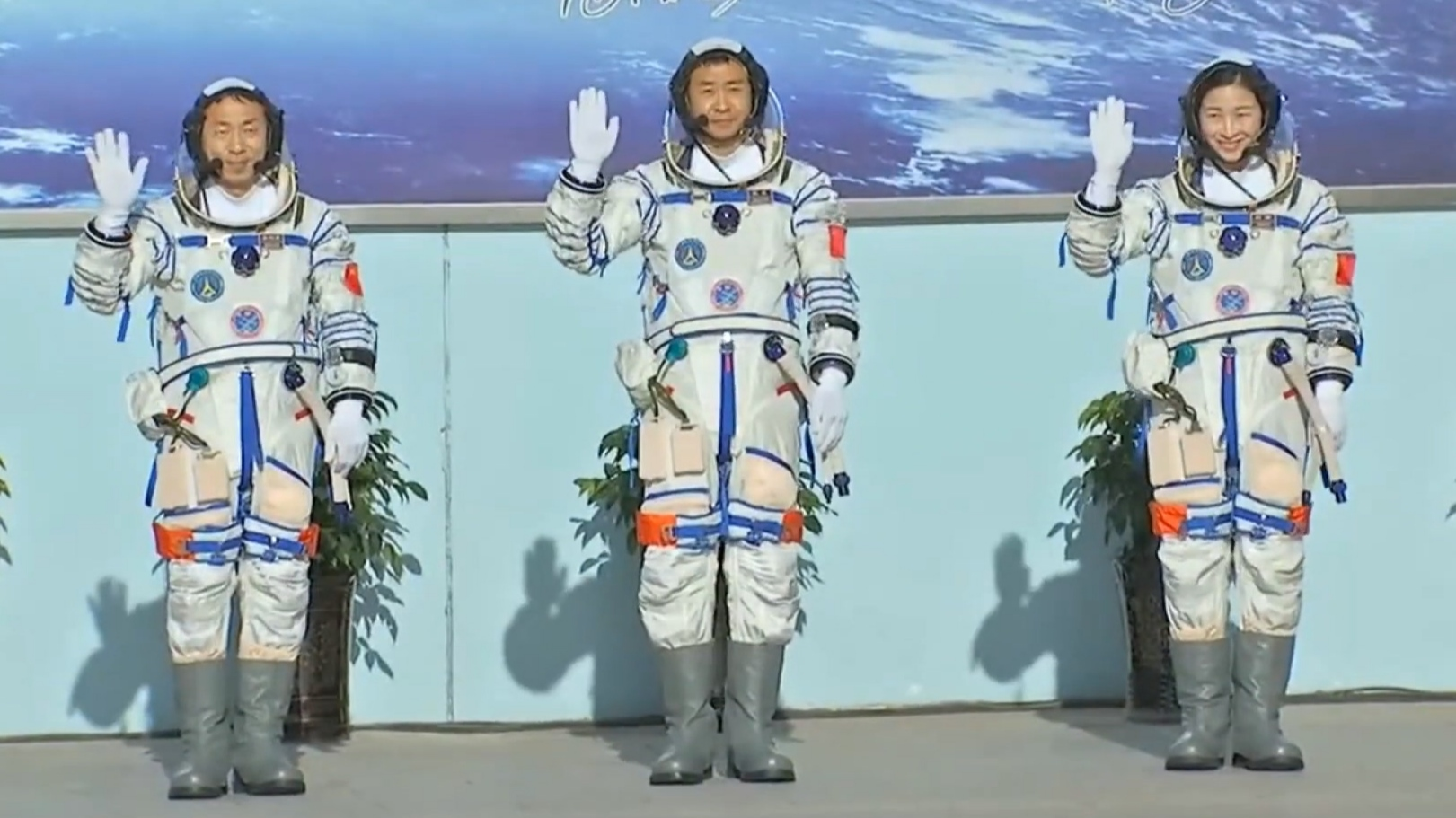
- Mission insignia From left: Cai Xuzhe, Chen Dong and Liu Yang Shenzhou program

Shenzhou 14 (simplified Chinese: 神舟十四号; traditional Chinese: 神舟十四號; pinyin: Shénzhōu shísì hào) was a Chinese spaceflight to the Tiangong space station, launched on 5 June 2022. It carried three People's Liberation Army Astronaut Corps (PLAAC) taikonauts on board a Shenzhou spacecraft. The mission was the ninth crewed Chinese spaceflight and the fourteenth flight overall of the Shenzhou program.

== Background ==
Shenzhou 14 was the third spaceflight to the Tiangong space station, and the second with a planned duration of six months (180 days). Shenzhou 14 would also mark the beginning of Tiangong being permanently inhabited, with Shenzhou 14 departing after the arrival of Shenzhou 15, and the same being done on subsequent expeditions.

Prior to launch, the Shenzhou 14 spacecraft was maintained in a state of near-readiness if needed as a lifeboat for the Shenzhou 13 crew.

The crew of Shenzhou 14 was announced on 4 June 2022.

== Mission ==
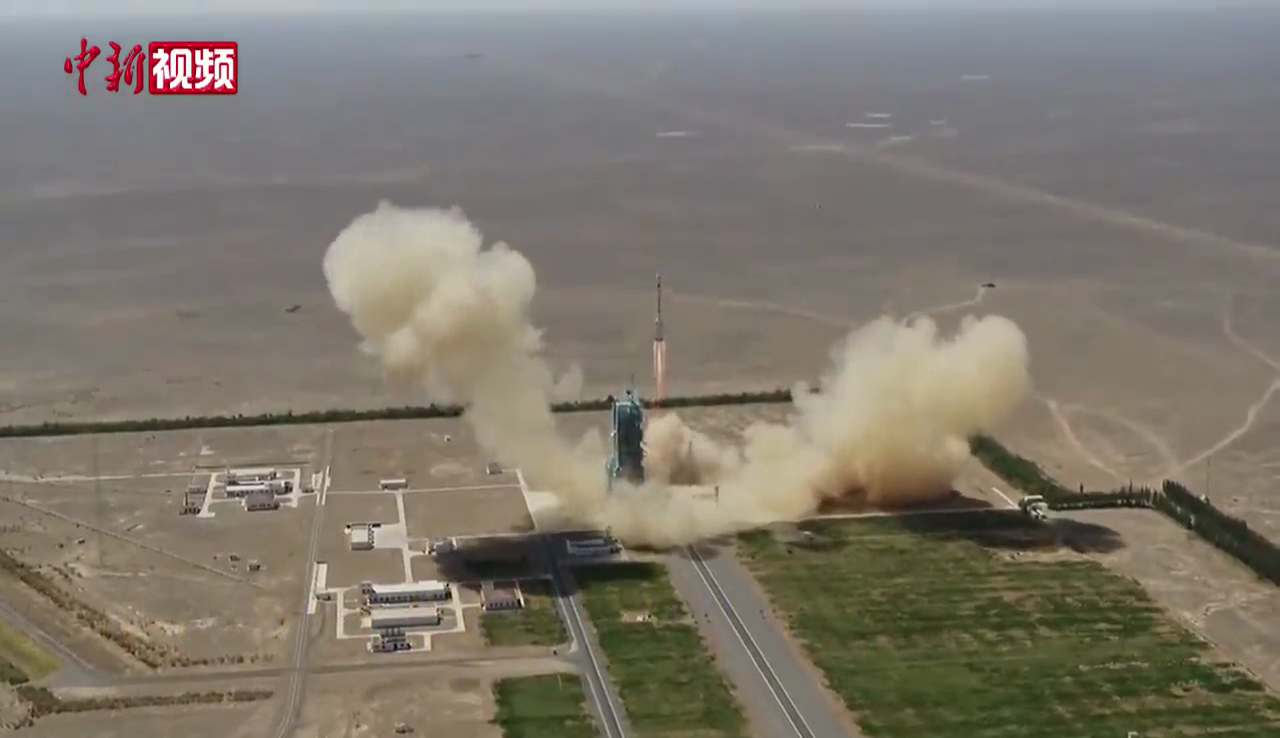
Launch of Shenzhou 14

The flight launched from Jiuquan Satellite Launch Center on 5 June 2022 at 02:44 UTC, following the launch of the Tianzhou 4 cargo resupply spacecraft. Just under 7 hours after launch, the spacecraft docked with the Tianhe core module's nadir docking port. The crew entered the station later the same day at 12:50 UTC.

During the mission, the Shenzhou 15 spacecraft remained on standby to serve as an emergency rescue vehicle.

The Shenzhou 14 crew carried out three spacewalks, worked on payloads both inside and outside the station, and carried out other scientific work during the six-month mission. The crew also oversaw the expansion of Tiangong with the addition of the Wentian and Mengtian laboratory cabin modules, which arrived at the station in July and October 2022 respectively. During Shenzhou 14's stay aboard Tiangong, the Tianzhou 5 cargo spacecraft arrived and docked with the station.

=== Station expansion ===
On 24 July 2022, the Wentian module launched and successfully docked with the Tianhe's forward port. The crew of Shenzhou 14 opened the hatch and entered Wentian for the first time on 25 July 2022 at 02:03 UTC, to perform an inspection of the module. Wentian was later repositioned to Tianhe's starboard port, its final location.

On 31 October 2022, the Mengtian module launched and successfully docked with Tianhe's forward port, and was repositioned to Tianhe's port-side port on 3 November 2022. Following Mengtian's reposition, the crew opened the hatch and entered Mengtian for the first time on 3 November 2022 at 07:12 UTC to inspect the module's interior.

=== Spacewalks ===
On 1 September 2022, the first scheduled spacewalk of Shenzhou 15 was carried out by Chen Dong and Liu Yang, with Liu Yang becoming the second Chinese woman to carry out a spacewalk. The two exited the airlock of the Wentian lab module and completed a series of tasks, including installing an extended pump set on the exterior of the station, raising panoramic camera B, installing a workbench, and demonstrating procedures for an emergency return to the airlock. The spacewalk lasted for 6 hours and 7 minutes.

On 17 September 2022, the second scheduled spacewalk was carried out by Chen Dong and Cai Xuzhe through the airlock of the Wentian lab module, with Liu Yang assisting the pair from inside the Tianhe core module. Chen and Cai completed the installation of foot restraints and extravehicular workbenches with support from the station's small robotic arm, performed further work on the extended pump set, and further verified EVA emergency rescue procedures. The spacewalk lasted for 4 hours and 12 minutes.

On 17 November 2022, the third spacewalk was carried out by Chen Dong and Cai Xuzhe through the airlock of the Wentian lab module, with Liu Yang once again assisting the pair from inside the Tianhe core module. Chen and Cai installed an inter-chamber connection device between Tianhe and Mengtian, raised panoramic A on Wentian, and installed a small mechanical arm power-assisted handle. The spacewalk lasted for 5 hours and 34 minutes.

=== Space lecture ===
On 12 October 2022 at 4:01 PM China Standard Time (08:01 UTC), the crew of Shenzhou 14 conducted a live "space lecture" broadcast. The "main classroom" was located in Beijing, with "branch classrooms" in Zhengzhou, Heze, and Dali. During the lecture, Chen Dong and Liu Yang introduced the functions of the Wentian module and conducted scientific experiments as part of a science lesson while Cai Xuzhe filmed. After the lesson, the taikonauts were given time to answer schoolchildren's questions from the classrooms.

=== Return ===
Shenzhou 14 returned to Earth on 4 December 2022, undocking from Tiangong at 03:01 UTC and landing at the Dongfeng landing site in the Gobi Desert in Inner Mongolia at 12:09 UTC.

== Crew ==
| Position | Crew |
|---|---|
| Commander | Chen Dong, PLAAC; Second spaceflight |
| Operator | Liu Yang, PLAAC; Second spaceflight |
| System Operator | Cai Xuzhe, PLAAC; First spaceflight |

Chen Dong previously flew on Shenzhou 11 and later flew to Tiangong again as commander of Shenzhou 20.

Liu Yang previously flew on Shenzhou 9, becoming the first Chinese woman in space.

Cai Xuzhe later flew to Tiangong again as commander of Shenzhou 19.
