= Mengtian experiment module =

Module of the Tiangong Space Station

Mengtian
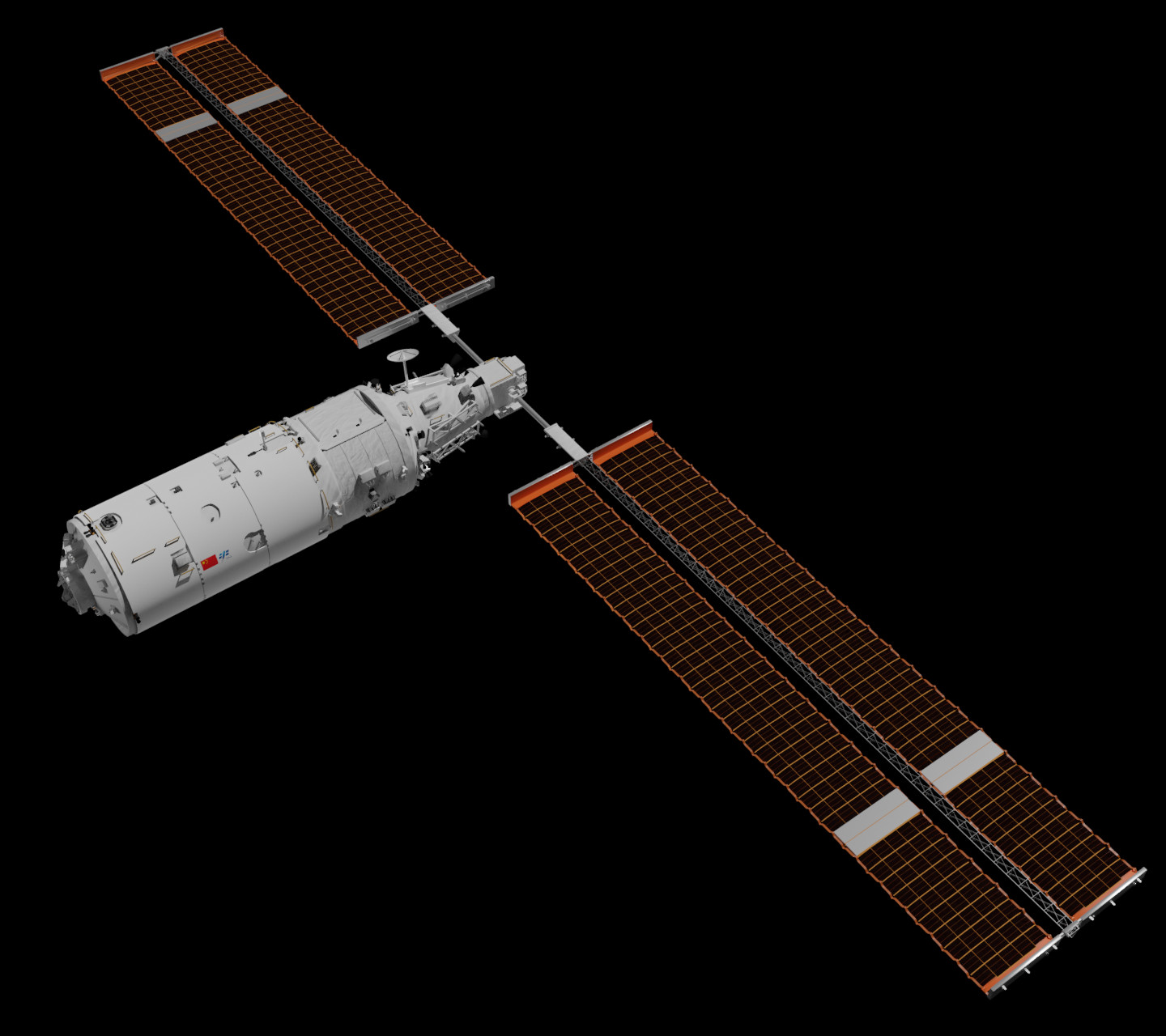
- Rendering of Mengtian experiment module

Module statistics
- COSPAR ID: 2022-143A
- Part of: Tiangong space station
- Launch date: 31 October 2022, 07:37:23 UTC (15:37:23 CST)
- Launch vehicle: Long March 5B (5B-Y4)
- Mass: At launch: ~23,000 kg (51,000 lb); In orbit: ~22,000 kg (49,000 lb)
- Length: 17.9 m (59 ft)
- Diameter: 4.2 m (14 ft)
- Pressurised volume: 109 m^{3} (3,800 cu ft); Habitable: 32 m^{3} (1,100 cu ft)

Docking with Tiangong space station
- Docking port: Tianhe forward
- Docking date: 31 October 2022, 20:27 UTC
- Undocking date: 3 November 2022, 00:48 UTC
- Time docked: 2 days, 4 hours, 21 minutes

Berthing at Tiangong space station (relocation)
- Berthing port: Tianhe port
- Berthing date: 3 November 2022, 01:32 UTC
- Time berthed: 3 years, 6 months, 23 days
- Insignia

Configuration
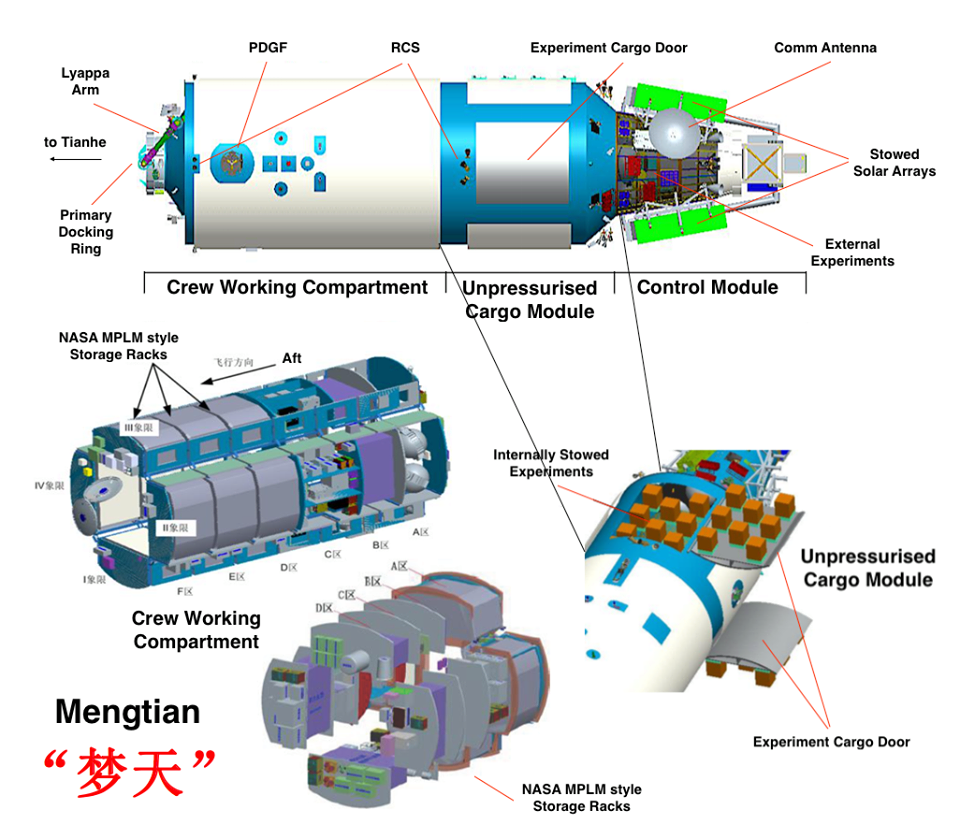
- Diagram of the Mengtian module

The Mengtian experiment module (simplified Chinese: 梦天实验舱; traditional Chinese: 夢天實驗艙; pinyin: Mèngtiān shíyàn cāng; lit. 'Dreaming of the Heavens experiment module') is a major module of the Tiangong space station. It is the second Experiment Module launched, after Wentian, and the second module to extend the existing Tianhe core module of the station. It was launched into orbit from the Wenchang Spacecraft Launch Site on 31 October 2022, successfully docking with Tianhe forward port at 20:27 UTC on the same day.

On 3 November 2022, Mengtian was relocated to the larboard port at 01:32 UTC by indexing robot arm. On the same day at 07:12 UTC, the crew of Shenzhou 14 opened the hatch and entered the module for the first time.

== Purpose ==
The Mengtian experiment module is equipped with expanded in-orbit experiment capacity, including eight research cabins. It provides a pressurized environment for researchers to conduct science experiments in freefall or zero gravity which could not be conducted on Earth for more than a few minutes. Experiments can also be placed on the outside of the modules, for exposure to the space environment, cosmic rays, vacuum, and solar winds. It has its own airlock.

The axial port of Mengtian is fitted with rendezvous equipment and will first dock to the axial port of Tianhe. A mechanical arm known as the indexing robotic arm, similar to the Lyappa arm on the Mir space station, then moves Mengtian to a portside port of the Tianhe Core Module. In addition to this arm used for docking relocation, the main robotic arm on Tianhe core module can also be used as a backup in place of the indexing robot arm.

Mengtian also carries a toolbox equipped with a dexterous robotic arm, installed to assist in cargo transfer and payload release, that can be used to launch microsatellites, and an augmented-reality smart glass to assist astronauts with maintenance.

Similarly to the Wentian module, electrical power is provided by two steerable solar power arrays, which use photovoltaic cells to convert sunlight into electricity. With a wingspan of over 55 m (180 ft), each array has an energy collection area of 110 m^{2} (1184 square ft). The energy is then stored to power the station when it passes into the Earth's shadow. Resupply ships will replenish fuel for experiment module 2 for station-keeping, to counter the effects of atmospheric drag.

== Aftermath ==
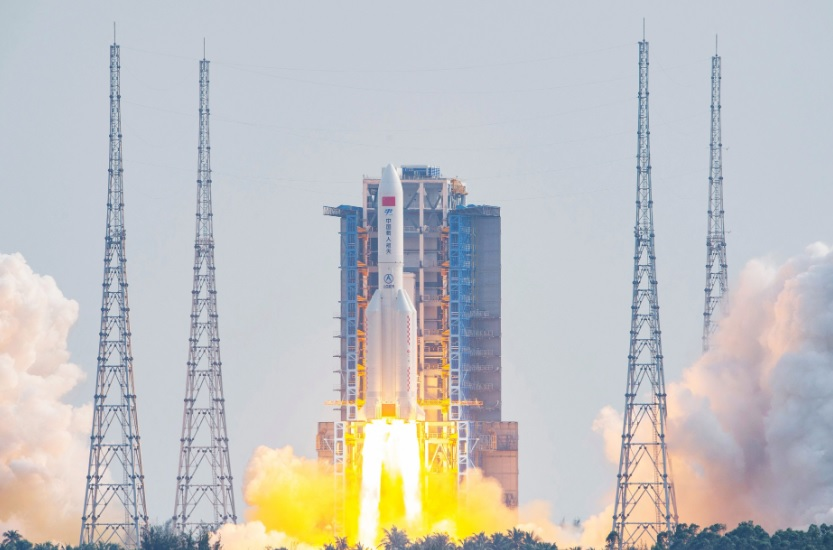
Launch of Mengtian

After launch, the Mengtian experiment module was inserted into a low Earth orbit with an average altitude of 393 km (244 mi) at an orbital inclination of 42 degrees, centered in the Earth's thermosphere. It successfully docked with the Tianhe core module nearly thirteen hours after launch.

== Assembly ==
The Shenzhou 14 mission to the space station assisted with setting up the Mengtian module in orbit.

== Gallery ==
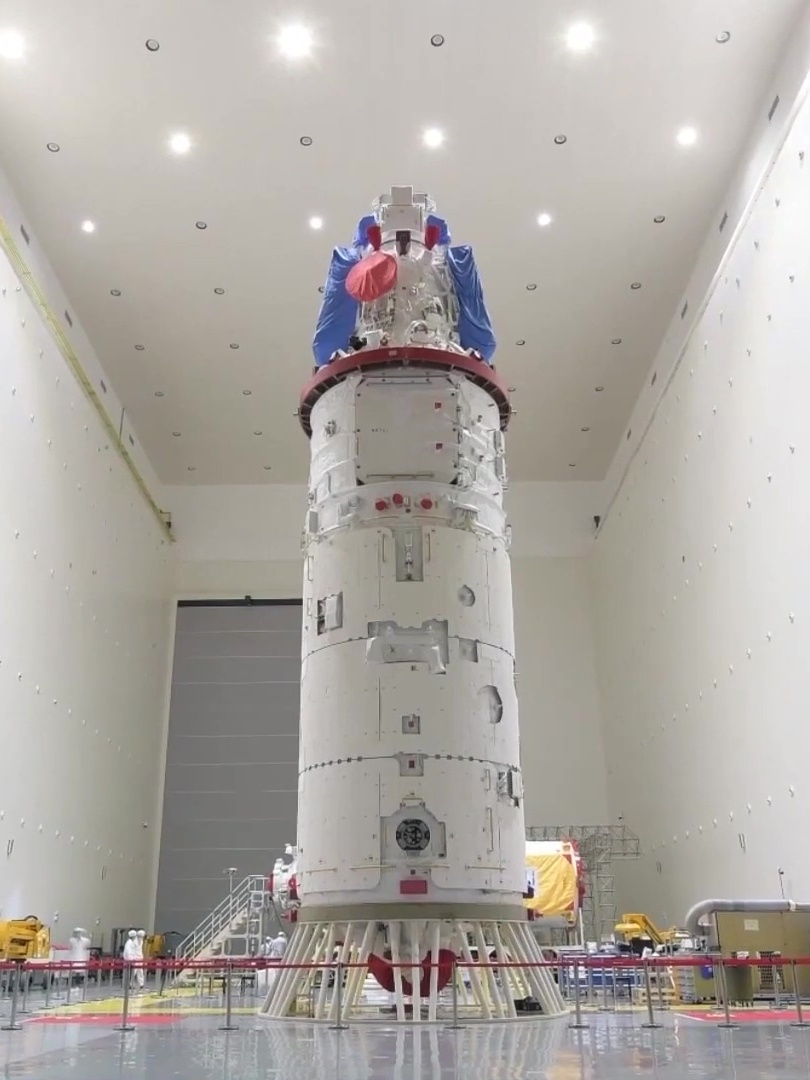
Mengtian lab module prior to launch

== See also ==
- Wentian module
- Tianhe Core Module
- Xuntian Space Telescope
