= Lyappa arm =

Robotic arm

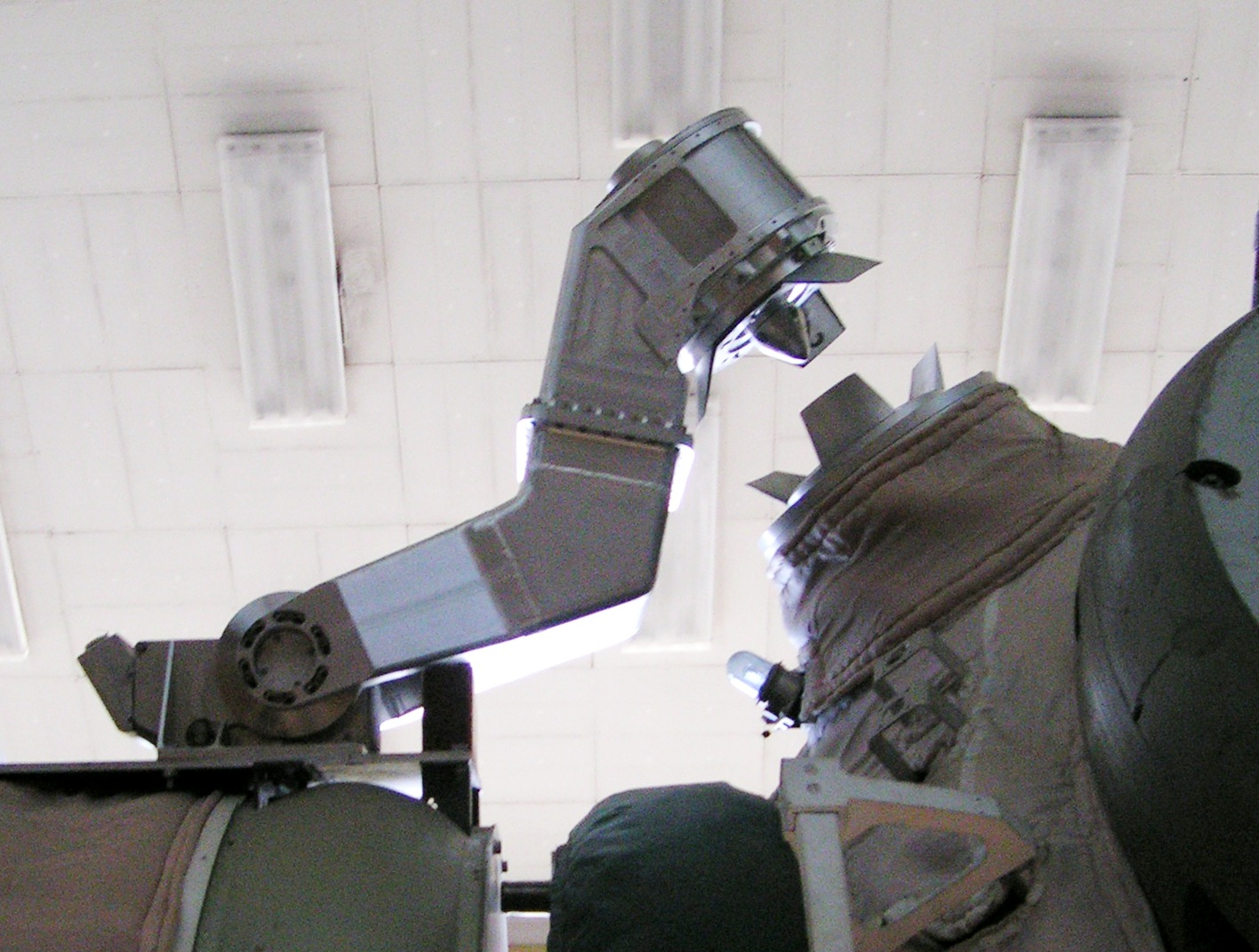
Lyappa arm on Mir mock-up at the Gagarin Cosmonaut Training Center.

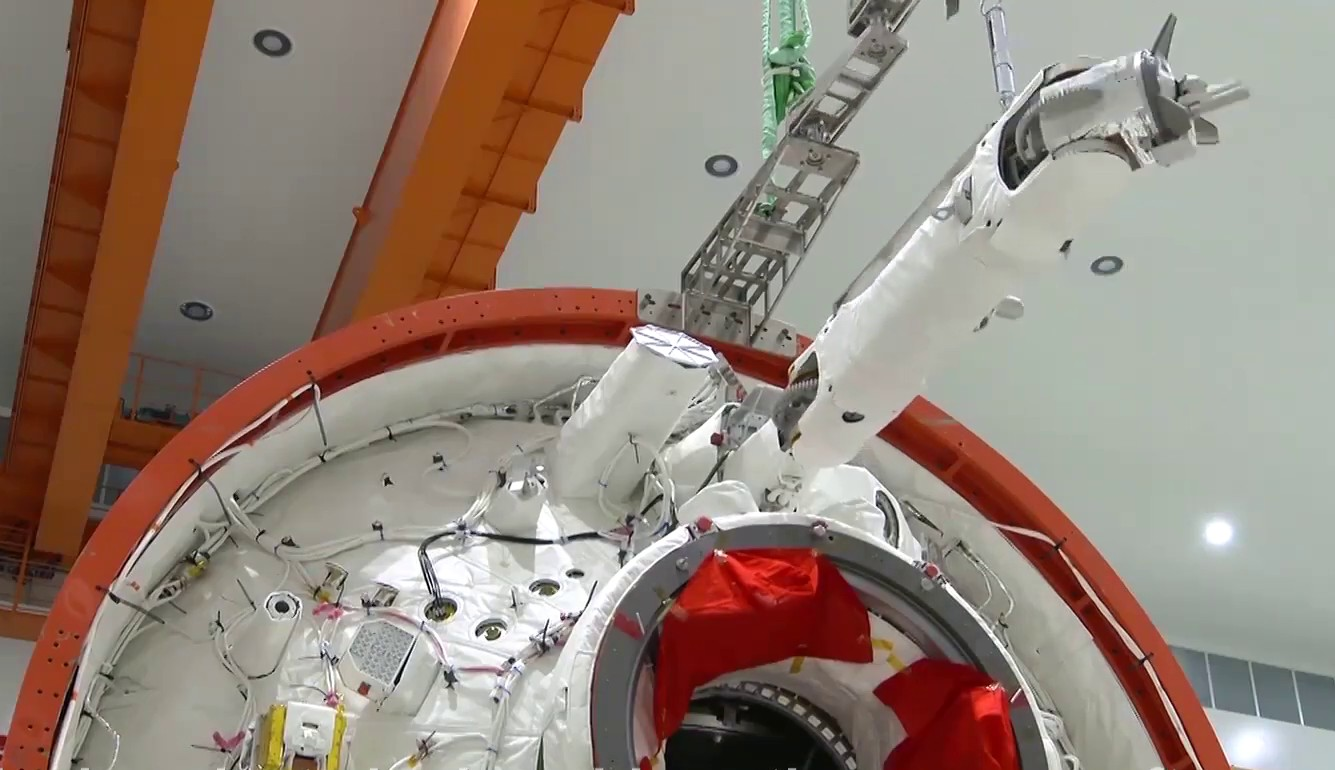
Indexing Robot Arm on Wentian

The Lyappa (or Ljappa) arm, officially Automatic system of re-docking (Russian: Автоматическая система перестыковки (АСПр), romanized: Avtomaticheskaya sistema perestykovki (ASPr)), was a robotic arm used during the assembly of the Soviet/Russian space station Mir. Each of the Kvant-2, Kristall, Spektr and Priroda modules was equipped with one of these arms, which, after the module had docked to the Mir Core Module's forward (or axial) port, grappled one of two fixtures positioned on the core module's hub module. The module's main docking probe was then retracted, and the arm raised the module so that it could be pivoted 90 degrees for docking to one of the four radial docking ports.

Likewise the Prichal module hosts grapple fixtures for the redocking of future modules docked to it from one port to another using the Lyappa Arm attached to those modules, if needed.

Both the Wentian and Mengtian modules of the Tiangong space station carry arms to enable them to manoeuvre around the docking hub of the Tianhe core module. A mechanical arm dubbed the indexing robotic arm, which looks similar to the Lyappa arm, allowed them to dock to a radial port of the Tianhe. Both modules are equipped with rendezvous hardware for automated docking to the forward port of Tianhe. After docking and inspections, the indexing robotic arms were used to relocate Wentian to the starboard port and Mengtian to the port-side port. Unlike the Lyappa arm, which tilts modules to dock them on different planes, the indexing arms work without changing pitch and is used for relocations within the same plane. The Chinarm on Tianhe can also serve as a backup for module relocation.

== Naming ==
The word “Lyappa” does not exist in Russian. It is probably a corruption of Russian: лапа, romanized: lapa, lit. 'paw'.

A fundamentally new element in this operation is the re-docking manipulator. Sometimes we just called it “paw”, which was clearer. This electromechanical arm, short and powerful, really resembled the paw of a Siberian bear, hence its name.

— Vladimir Syromyatnikov

== Gallery ==
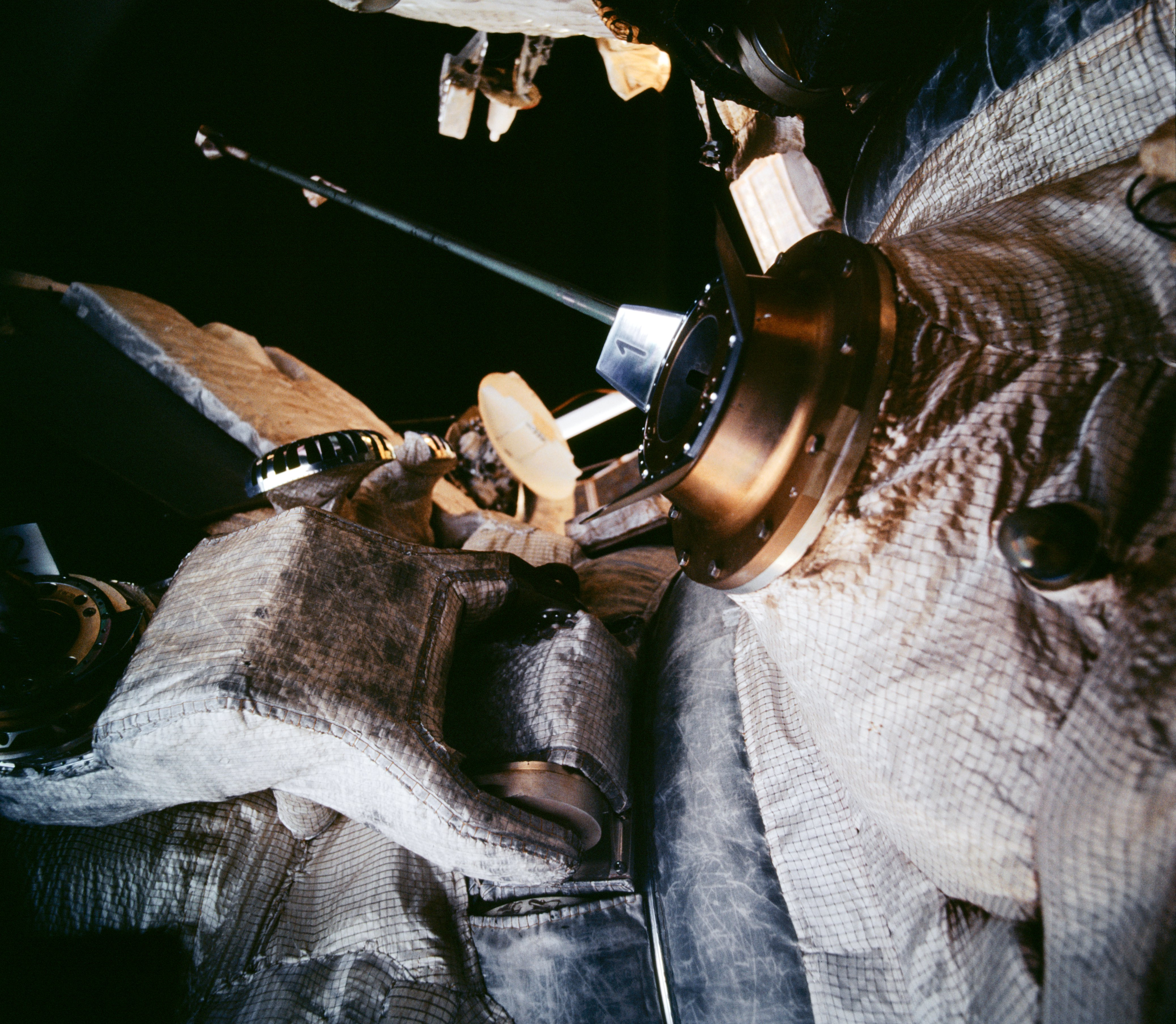
Lyappa arm and attach fixture on Mir

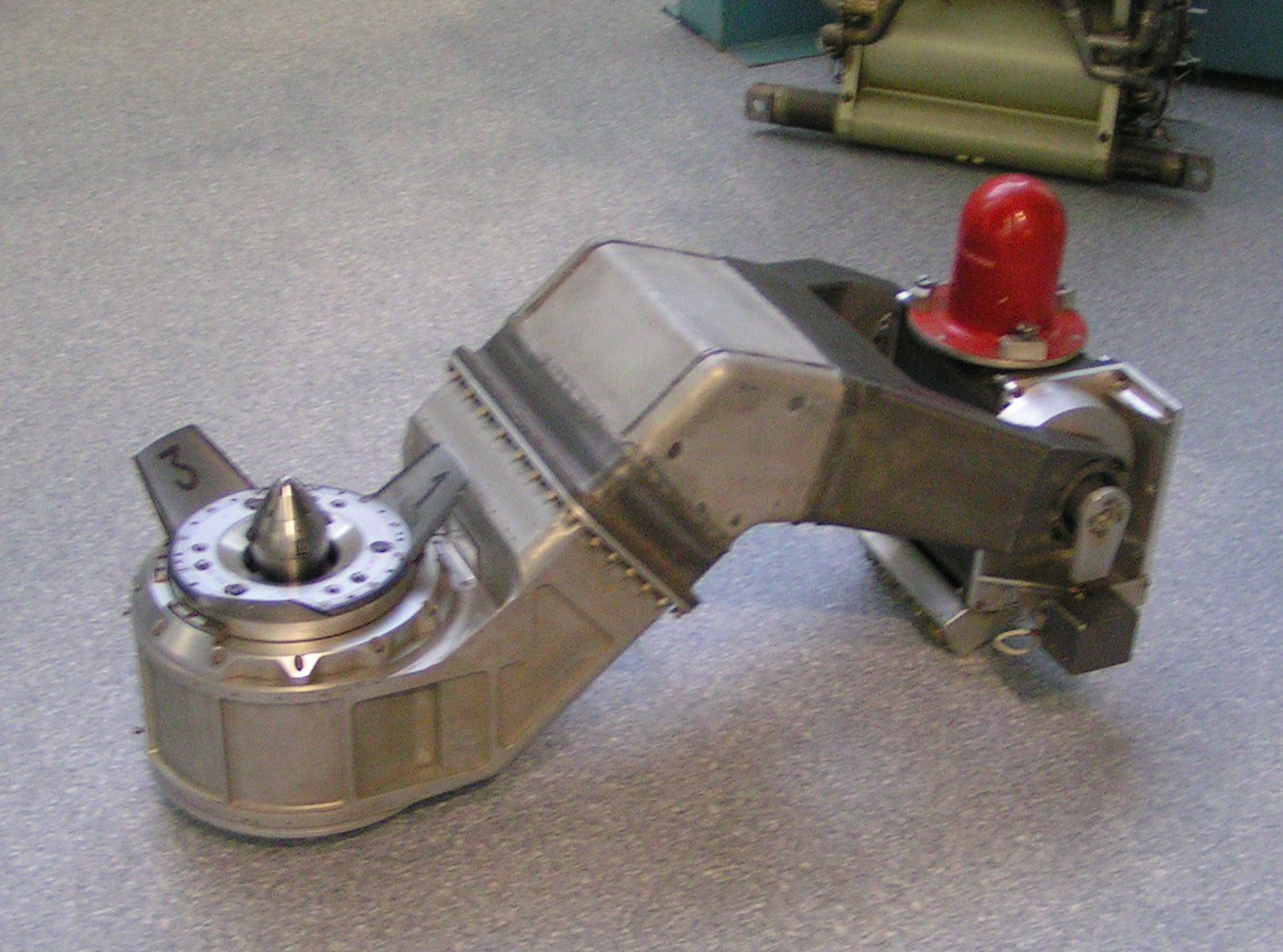
Lyappa arm at the RKK Energiya museum

A diagram showing how the arm was used to relocate Kvant-2.

A diagram showing the Konus drogue and module movements around Mir's docking node
