= Tiangong space station =

Chinese modular space station (since 2021)

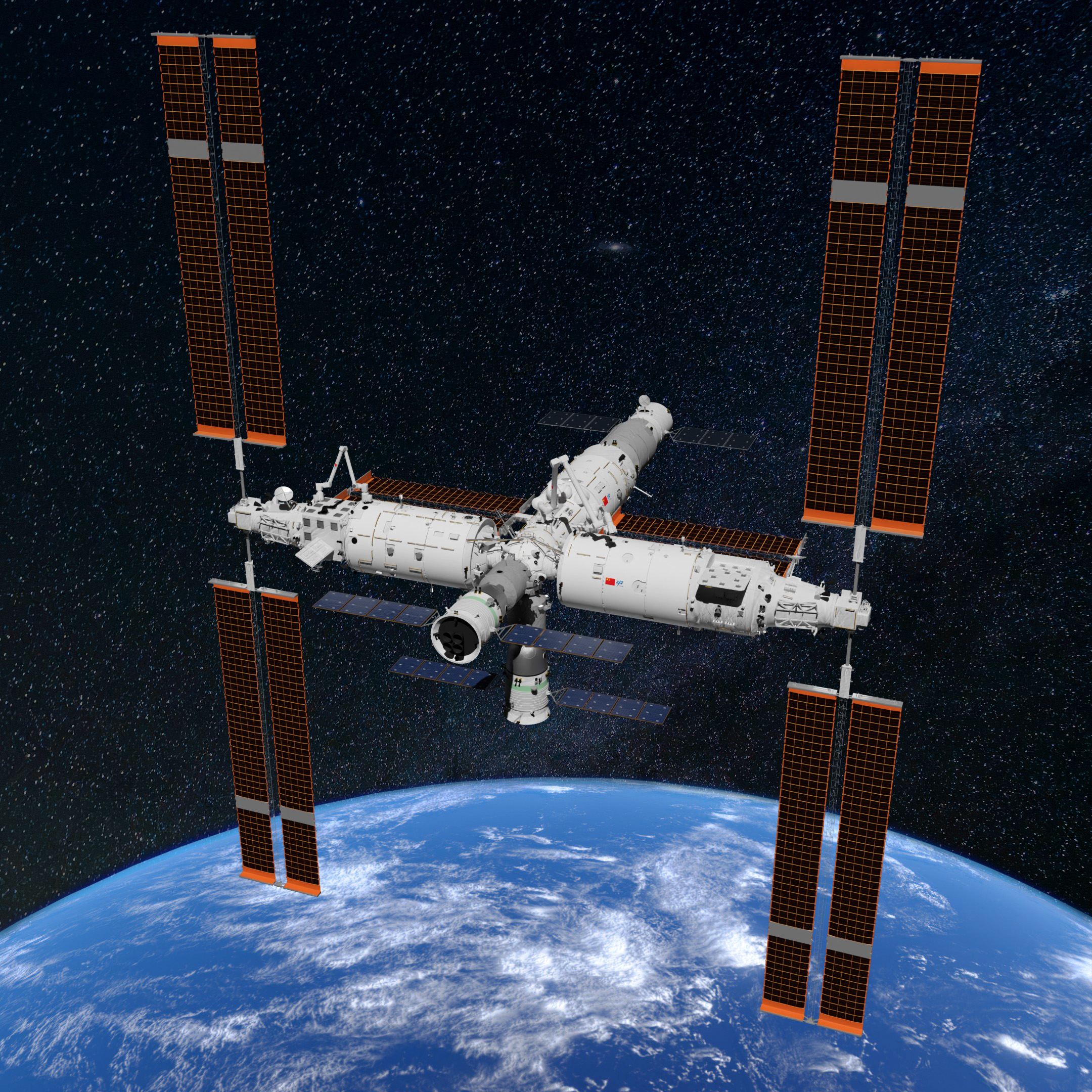
- A rendering of the three module station with a Tianzhou spacecraft docked aft and two Shenzhou spacecraft docked to the forward and nadir (Earth facing) ports

Station statistics
- COSPAR ID: 2021-035A
- SATCAT no.: 48274
- Crew: Size: 3 (Note: Typical: 3; Maximum: 6); Current expedition: 11 (Shenzhou 23); Current commander: Zhu Yangzhu
- Launch: 29 April 2021 (Tianhe); 24 July 2022 (Wentian); 31 October 2022 (Mengtian)
- Launch pad: Wenchang, LC-101
- Mass: ~100,000 kg (220,000 lb)
- Length: ~55.6 m (182 ft)
- Diameter: ~39 m (128 ft)
- Pressurised volume: 340 m^{3} (12,000 ft^{3}); Habitable: 122 m^{3} (4,310 ft^{3})
- Periapsis altitude: 386.4 km (240.1 mi)
- Apoapsis altitude: 391.8 km (243.5 mi)
- Orbital inclination: 41.47°
- Orbital speed: 7.67 km/s (27,600 km/h; 17,200 mph)
- Orbital period: 92.3 minutes
- Days in orbit: 5 years, 6 months, 23 days as of 21 November 2026
- Days occupied: 5 years, 2 months, 14 days as of 21 November 2026
- Statistics as of 25 April 2024 (unless noted otherwise); References
- Configuration
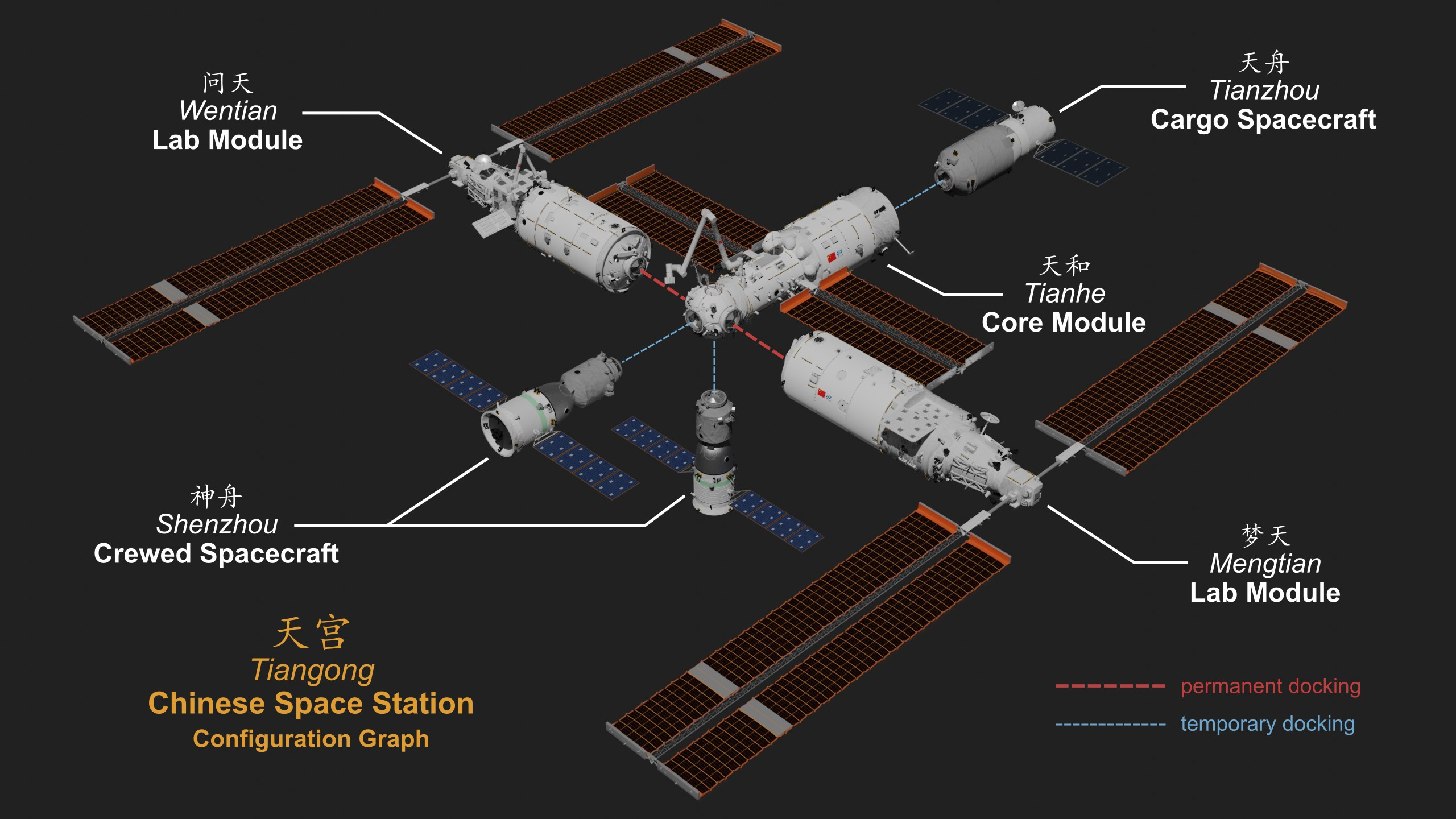
- Station elements as of April 2024 (exploded view)

Tiangong space station
- Simplified Chinese: 天宫空间站
- Traditional Chinese: 天宮空間站
- Literal meaning: "Heavenly Palace Space Station"
Transcriptions
Standard Mandarin
- Hanyu Pinyin: Tiāngōng kōngjiānzhàn
- Bopomofo: ㄊㄧㄢ ㄍㄨㄥ ㄎㄨㄥ ㄐㄧㄢ ㄓㄢˋ
- Wade–Giles: T'ien^{1}-kung^{1} k'ung^{1}-chien^{1}-chan^{4}
- Yale Romanization: TyānGūng KūngJyān Jàn
- IPA: [tʰjɛ́nkʊ́ŋ kʰʊ́ŋtɕjɛ́nʈʂân]

The Tiangong space station (Chinese: 天宫; pinyin: Tiāngōng; lit. 'Heavenly Palace'), officially the China Space Station (Note: Chinese: 中国空间站; pinyin: Zhōngguó kōngjiānzhàn) (CSS) in English, (Note: The China Manned Space Agency refers to the station in English as the China Space Station, but English language news sources commonly use Tiangong space station.) is China's first permanently crewed space station, in low Earth orbit since 2021. Operated by the China Manned Space Agency (CMSA), it is China's third space station, under the Tiangong subprogram of the China Manned Space Program. A space laboratory, it hosts experiments on bioastronautics, microgravity, materials science and space technology. Crews of three travel aboard the Shenzhou spacecraft for missions of about six months, with temporary crew sizes of six during handovers. Cargo missions use the Tianzhou spacecraft. It is one of two operational space stations, alongside the International Space Station (ISS).

When China formally requested to join the ISS program in 2007, Roscosmos and the European Space Agency (ESA) supported cooperation with China, but the Wolf Amendment, enacted by the United States since 2011, prohibited Chinese participation. That same year, China launched Tiangong-1, gaining rendezvous and docking experience. In 2016, Tiangong-2 developed longer-term life support systems, and autonomous docking and refueling via Tianzhou. The current station has supported experiments involving researchers from 17 countries; Chinese experiments include atomic clocks, Bose–Einstein condensates, and the agricultural cycle of rice. It hosted the first astronaut from Hong Kong, and China is training astronauts from Macau and Pakistan.

Tiangong is the third modular space station, after Mir and the ISS. Its core module, Tianhe, was launched in April 2021 and was followed by the Wentian and Mengtian experiment modules in July and October 2022; The modules were assembled at and launched from Wenchang Space Launch Site, atop Long March 5B rockets. The station has three robotic arms in use and three external Chinese Docking Mechanism ports. Xuntian, a space telescope scheduled for launch in 2027, is designed to periodically dock with the station for servicing and refueling. Orbiting at an altitude of 340 to 450 kilometres (210 to 280 mi) and inclination of 41°, it has a pressurised volume of 340 cubic metres (12,000 ft^{3}), slightly over one third that of the ISS.

Shenzhou 12 in June 2021 was the first crewed mission to the station. Shenzhou 15 in November 2022 completed major station assembly and began continuous occupation; later missions have focused on scientific research. Shenzhou 23 is the first attempt at a year-long mission. Tiangong is the first crewed spacecraft to use ion thrusters, for orbital station-keeping, while communications are relayed through the Tianlian satellite network. As of May 2026, 21 spacecraft have docked to the station: 12 Shenzhou and 9 Tianzhou. Crews have made 24 spacewalks, using the Feitian suit, including the longest spacewalk ever, exceeding 9 hours in 2024.

== Nomenclature ==
Early names used in the Chinese space program were largely drawn from the revolutionary history of the People's Republic of China. In recent decades, these have been replaced by names with mythological or religious connotations. Examples include the Shenzhou (神舟; Shénzhōu; 'Divine Vessel') crewed spacecraft, the Shenlong (神龙; Shénlóng; 'Divine Dragon') spaceplane, the Shenguang (神光; Shénguāng; 'Divine Light') high-power laser, and the Shenwei (神威; Shénwēi; 'Divine Might') supercomputer.

These mythological names continue in the Chinese Lunar Exploration Program, whose probes are named Chang'e after the Moon goddess. The name Tiangong was similarly reported to evoke cultural and romantic imagery, with the launch of Tiangong-1 inspiring public expressions such as love poetry, and media comparing the docking of spacecraft to the reunion of the cowherd and the weaver girl from folklore.

In 2011, Wang Wenbao, director of CMSA, stated that the agency sought names that would "carry a resounding and encouraging" message and reflect public participation in the program.

On 31 October 2013, CMSA announced standardized names for space station elements:

- Tiangong would refer to both the precursor space labs—Tiangong-1 (2011) and Tiangong-2 (2016)—and the modular space station.
- Tianzhou (天舟; Tiān Zhōu; 'Heavenly Ship') for the cargo spacecraft
- Tianhe (天和; Tiān Hé; 'Harmony of the Heavens') for the core module of the modular space station, launched on 29 April 2021.
- Wentian (问天; Wèn Tiān; 'Quest for the Heavens') for the first laboratory module of the modular space station, launched on 24 July 2022.
- Mengtian (梦天; Mèng Tiān; 'Dreaming of the Heavens') for the second laboratory module of the modular space station, launched on 31 October 2022.
- Xuntian (巡天; Xún Tiān; 'Touring the Heavens') for the co-orbiting space telescope module, scheduled for launch in 2027.

== Purpose and mission ==
According to CMSA, which operates the space station, the purpose and mission is to develop and gain experience in spacecraft rendezvous technology, permanent human operations in orbit, long-term autonomous spaceflight of the space station, regenerative life support technology and autonomous cargo and fuel supply technology. It will also serve the platform for the next-generation orbit transportation vehicles, scientific and practical applications at large-scale in orbit, and technology for future deep space exploration.

CMSA also encourages commercial activities led by the private sector and hopes their involvement could bring cost-effective aerospace innovations. Space tourism aboard the station is also being considered.

China launched Tiangong-1 in 2011, gaining rendezvous and docking experience. In 2016, Tiangong-2 developed longer-term life support systems, and autonomous docking and refuelling via Tianzhou.

=== Scientific research ===
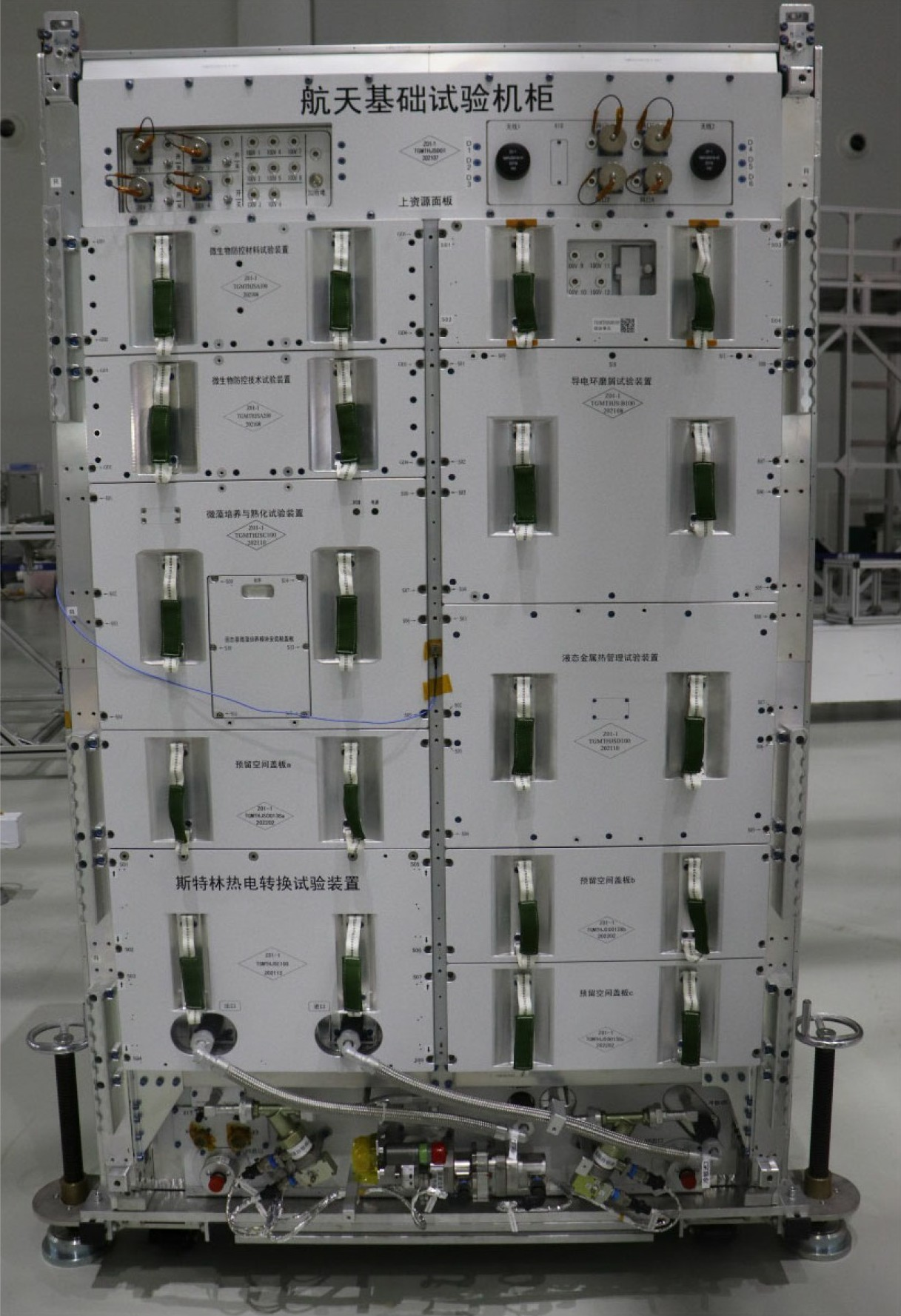
Basic space experiment cabinet of Tiangong space station

The space station will have 23 experimental racks in an enclosed, pressurised environment. There will also be platforms for exposed experiments; 22 and 30 on the Wentian and Mengtian laboratory modules, respectively. Over 1,000 experiments are tentatively approved by CMSA, and scheduled to be conducted on the space station.

The programmed experiment equipment racks for the three modules as of June 2016 were:

- Space life sciences and biotechnology
  - Ecology Science Experiment Rack (ESER)
  - Biotechnology Experiment Rack (BER)
  - Science Glove-box and Refrigerator Rack (SGRR)
- Microgravity fluid physics and combustion
  - Fluids Physics Experiment Rack (FPER)
  - Two-phase System Experiment Rack (TSER)
  - Combustion Experiment Rack (CER)
- Material science in space
  - Material Furnace Experiment Rack (MFER)
  - Container-less Material Experiment Rack (CLMER)
- Fundamental Physics in Microgravity
  - Cold Atom Experiment Rack (CAER)
  - High-precision Time-Frequency Rack (HPTFR)
- Multipurpose Facilities
  - High Micro-gravity Level Rack (HMGLR)
  - Varying-Gravity Experiment Rack (VGER)
  - Modularized Experiment Rack (RACK)

==== Biology ====
Agriculture in microgravity was explored with cultivation of rice and Arabidopsis thaliana as sustainable food sources for long-term spaceflight. In 2022, the station completed the first complete agricultural cycle of rice in microgravity, from seed to harvest to seed replanting.

A novel bacterial strain, Niallia tiangongensis, was discovered on the station in May 2023 during Shenzhou 15. The strain is particularly adept at metabolizing gelatin.

==== Physics ====
Physics experiments are contained in the Mengtian module.

The Cold Atom Physics Research Rack (CAPR) brings ultracold atoms down to a temperature of 100 picokelvin, via a rubidium-87 Bose–Einstein condensate and a method scientists call "Two-Stage Crossed Beam Cooling".

The High-precision Time-Frequency Rack (HTFR) contains three types of atomic clock: a strontium-based optical clock, a hydrogen maser, and a laser-cooled microwave clock, achieving a time deviation of 0.08 picoseconds per 300 seconds.

=== Education and cultural outreach ===
The space station features space lectures and popular science experiments to educate, motivate and inspire the younger Chinese generation and world audience in science and technology. Each lecture is concluded with a question-and-answer session with school children's questions from classrooms across China. The first and second Tiangong space lesson was conducted in December 2021 and March 2022, as a part of the Shenzhou 13 mission. This tradition continued with the Shenzhou 14.

The CSSARC is the Amateur Radio payload for the Chinese Space Station, proposed by the Chinese Radio Amateurs Club (CRAC), Aerospace System Engineering Research Institute of Shanghai (ASES) and Harbin Institute of Technology (HIT). The payload will provide resources for radio amateurs worldwide to contact onboard astronauts or communicate with each other, aim to inspire students to take interests and careers in science, technology, engineering, and math, and encourage more people to get interested in amateur radio.

The first phase of the payload is capable of providing the following functions utilising the VHF/UHF amateur radio band:

- V/V or U/U crew voice
- V/U or U/V FM repeater
- V/V or U/U 1k2 AFSK digipeater
- V/V or U/U SSTV or digital image

== Structure ==
Tiangong is a third-generation modular space station. First-generation stations, such as the early Salyut and Almaz stations and Skylab, were single-module outposts that were not designed for resupply. Second-generation stations, including Salyut 6 and 7 and Tiangong 1 and 2, incorporated docking ports that enabled mid-mission resupply. Third-generation stations, such as Mir and the International Space Station, are modular complexes assembled in orbit from multiple components launched separately. Modular design can improve reliability, reduce costs, shorten development cycles, and support more diverse mission requirements.

Below is a diagram of major station components.

Key to box background colors:

- Pressurised component, accessible by the crew without using spacesuits
- Docking/berthing port, pressurized when a visiting spacecraft is present
- Airlock, to move people or material between pressurized and unpressurized environment
- Unpressurised component

Wentian robotic arm	Core Module Manipulator robotic arm
Solar array	Solar array	Docking port (aft)	Solar array	Solar array
Wentian laboratory	Tianhe core module	Mengtian laboratory
Solar array	EVA hatch (zenith)	Docking port (forward)	Docking port (nadir)	Solar array
EVA airlock	Cargo airlock

=== Modules ===
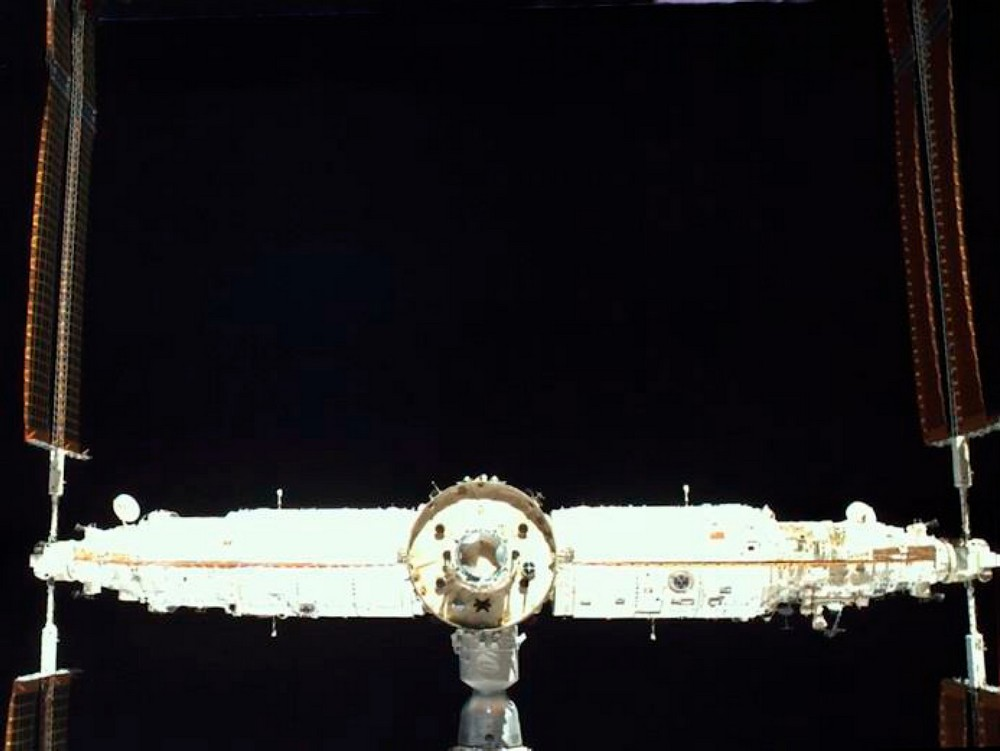
Rear view of Tiangong Space Station, taken by a Tianzhou cargo spacecraft ahead of docking.

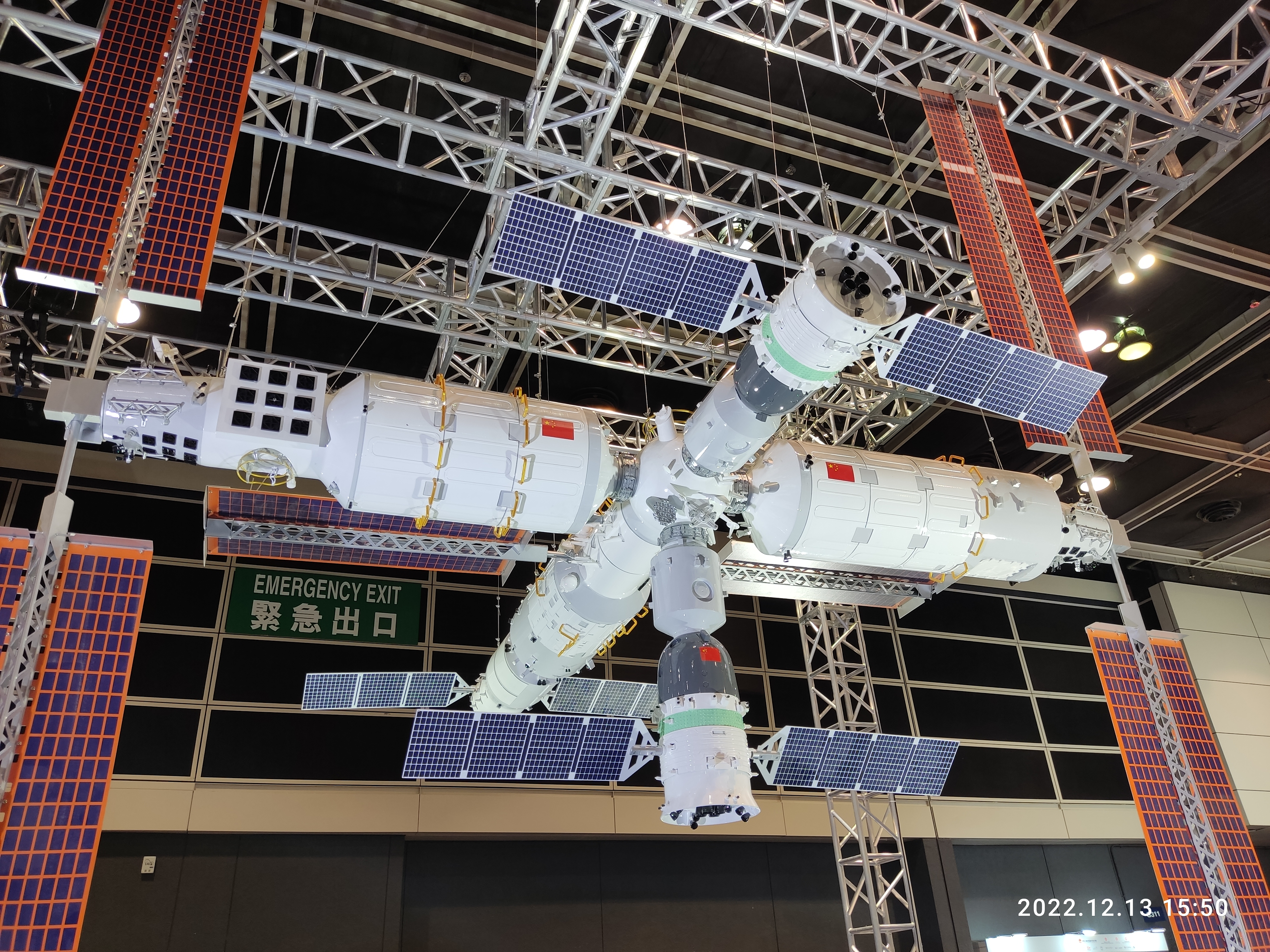
A mockup of Tiangong displayed in Hong Kong in 2022

Tiangong was completed in a three-module configuration in 2022. China has proposed several expansion concepts. Initial proposals called for enlarging the station to six modules by duplicating the original trio, but by 2023 this evolved into a plan to add a fourth module with six docking ports to accommodate future growth. In October 2023, China announced a revised roadmap to expand Tiangong to six modules beginning in 2027.

The Tianhe core module provides life support and living quarters for three crew members and houses the station's guidance, navigation, and orientation control systems. It also contains the main power, propulsion, and environmental control systems. It is based on the Russian Functional Cargo Block. Tianhe is divided into three sections: living quarters, a service module, and a docking hub. The living area includes a kitchen, toilet, fire suppression equipment, atmospheric control systems, computers, scientific apparatus, and communications equipment for contact with ground control in Beijing. Tianhe also carries the Core Module Manipulator (CMM), a large robotic arm used for EVA support and as a backup for module relocation. A full-scale mockup of Tianhe was displayed at the China International Aviation & Aerospace Exhibition in Zhuhai in 2018. CMSA videos have shown that two core modules have been constructed.

The first of the two Experiment Modules, Wentian, provides additional avionics, propulsion, and life-support capacity as backups to Tianhe. It includes three short-term crew quarters for use during handovers and features a dedicated airlock for extravehicular activities (EVAs), replacing the temporary use of Tianhe's docking hub, which was not purpose-built for that function. Wentian carries internal experiment racks and 22 external experiment adapters. It was launched and docked with Tianhe on 24 July 2022 and moved to its permanent starboard position on 30 September.

The second experiment module, Mengtian, provides expanded in-orbit experiment capability with 13 internal experiment racks and 37 external experiment adapters. It also features a dedicated cargo airlock designed specifically for transferring scientific payloads between the station interior and exterior. Mengtian was launched and docked with Tianhe on 31 October 2022 and moved to its permanent port-side position on 3 November.

Together, the two experiment modules support microgravity and freefall research that cannot be conducted on Earth for extended periods. Experiments can also be mounted externally for exposure to the space environment, including cosmic radiation, vacuum, and the solar wind. Wentian focuses primarily on life sciences, while Mengtian is oriented toward microgravity research.

Both experiment modules are equipped with rendezvous hardware for automated docking to the forward port of Tianhe. After docking and inspections, the indexing robotic arms mounted on Wentian and Mengtian—similar in function to the Lyappa arm used on Mir—were used to relocate Wentian to the starboard port and Mengtian to the port-side port. The CMM on Tianhe can also serve as a backup for module relocation.

Module	Launch (UTC)	Launch vehicle (Flight)	Docking date (UTC) / position	Length	Diameter	Mass	Illustration	Ground image
Tianhe	29 April 2021 03:23:15	Long March 5B (Y2)	—N/a	16.6 m (54 ft)	4.2 m (14 ft)	22,500 kg (49,600 lb)		The Tianhe core module prior to launch, 2021
Tianhe	Core module with three sections: living quarters, the service section, and a docking hub.							The Tianhe core module prior to launch, 2021
Wentian	24 July 2022 06:22:32	Long March 5B (Y3)	24 July 2022 19:13 (forward) 30 September 2022 04:44 (starboard)	17.9 m (59 ft)	4.2 m (14 ft)	23,200 kg (51,100 lb)		The Wentian laboratory cabin module prior to launch, 2022
Wentian	First lab module, also serves as backup to core module's station control and management functions. Equipped with an EVA airlock and a 5-metre-long (16 ft) robotic arm.							The Wentian laboratory cabin module prior to launch, 2022
Mengtian	31 October 2022 07:37:23	Long March 5B (Y4)	31 October 2022 20:27 (forward) 3 November 2022 01:32 (port)	17.9 m (59 ft)	4.2 m (14 ft)	~23,000 kg (51,000 lb)		The Mengtian laboratory cabin module prior to launch, 2022
Mengtian	Second lab module with cargo airlock and payload transportation system.							The Mengtian laboratory cabin module prior to launch, 2022

=== Systems ===
==== Communication ====
Real-time communications, including live audio and video links, are provided by the Tianlian II series of data relay satellites. A constellation of three satellites was launched into geostationary orbits, providing communication and data support for the station.

==== Docking ====
Tiangong is equipped with the Chinese Docking Mechanism, first used by Shenzhou 8 spacecraft and the Tiangong-1 space laboratory. This system is based on the APAS-89/APAS-95 developed by Russia and NASA. While NASA has described it as a "clone" of APAS, there are conflicting claims about its compatibility with current and future docking mechanisms on the ISS, which are also APAS-based. The mechanism features a circular transfer passage with a diameter of 800 millimetres (31 in). The androgynous variant weighs 310 kg (680 lb), while the non-androgynous version weighs 200 kg (440 lb).

==== Power supply ====
Animation showing the deployment of flexible solar arrays on the Tianhe core module

Electrical power is provided by two steerable flexible solar arrays on each module, using gallium arsenide photovoltaic cells to convert sunlight into electricity. Energy is stored for use when the station passes through Earth's shadow. Resupply spacecraft replenish fuel for propulsion engines, which maintain orbit and counter atmospheric drag. The solar arrays are designed to last up to 15 years.

==== Propulsion and attitude control ====
Tiangong uses conventional chemical engines and ion thrusters for orbital adjustments and station-keeping.

The Tianhe core module is equipped with four Hall-effect thrusters, the first ever used on a crewed spacecraft. These thrusters are far more efficient than traditional engines, cutting fuel use by 90%. Ground tests showed the system can run for more than 8,000 hours without failure, supporting Tiangong's planned 15-year lifespan. Magnetic shielding and advanced ceramics protect the engines and module from erosion caused by high-speed ion particles.

For attitude control, Tiangong relies mainly on 12 control moment gyroscopes, which allow precise orientation without burning fuel, saving propellant and extending the station's life. They provide high pointing accuracy—better than 0.1°—for Earth observation and scientific experiments. This system also keeps the station stable during reboost maneuvers by visiting cargo ships.

==== Robotic arms ====
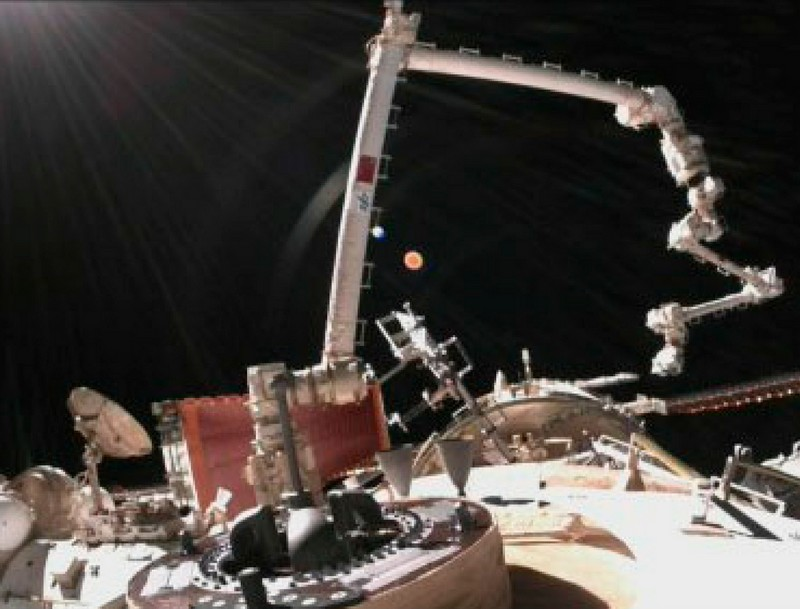
The combined CMM and EMM arms

The Tiangong space station features three robotic arms. The largest is a 10-metre-long (33 ft) arm called the Core Module Manipulator (CMM) mounted on the Tianhe core module. Its function is similar to the Canadarm2 on the International Space Station.

The Wentian module is equipped with a 5-metre-long (16 ft) arm called the Experiment Module Manipulator (EMM) that is five times more precise in positioning than the CMM. This arm is primarily used to transfer experiments and other hardware outside the station during astronaut EVAs. A dual-arm connector on CMM allows it to link with the EMM, extending its reach and increasing its weight-handling capacity.

The Mengtian module carries a payload release mechanism designed to assist with experiment transfers. This robotic arm can retrieve experiments from the cargo airlock and install them onto the module's exterior. It can also be used to deploy microsatellites.

Additionally, there are two indexing robotic arms installed near the docking ports of the two laboratory modules. These arms were used to relocate the modules from their initial docking port to their final positions, similar in function to the Lyappa arm on the Mir space station.

=== Co-orbital space telescope ===
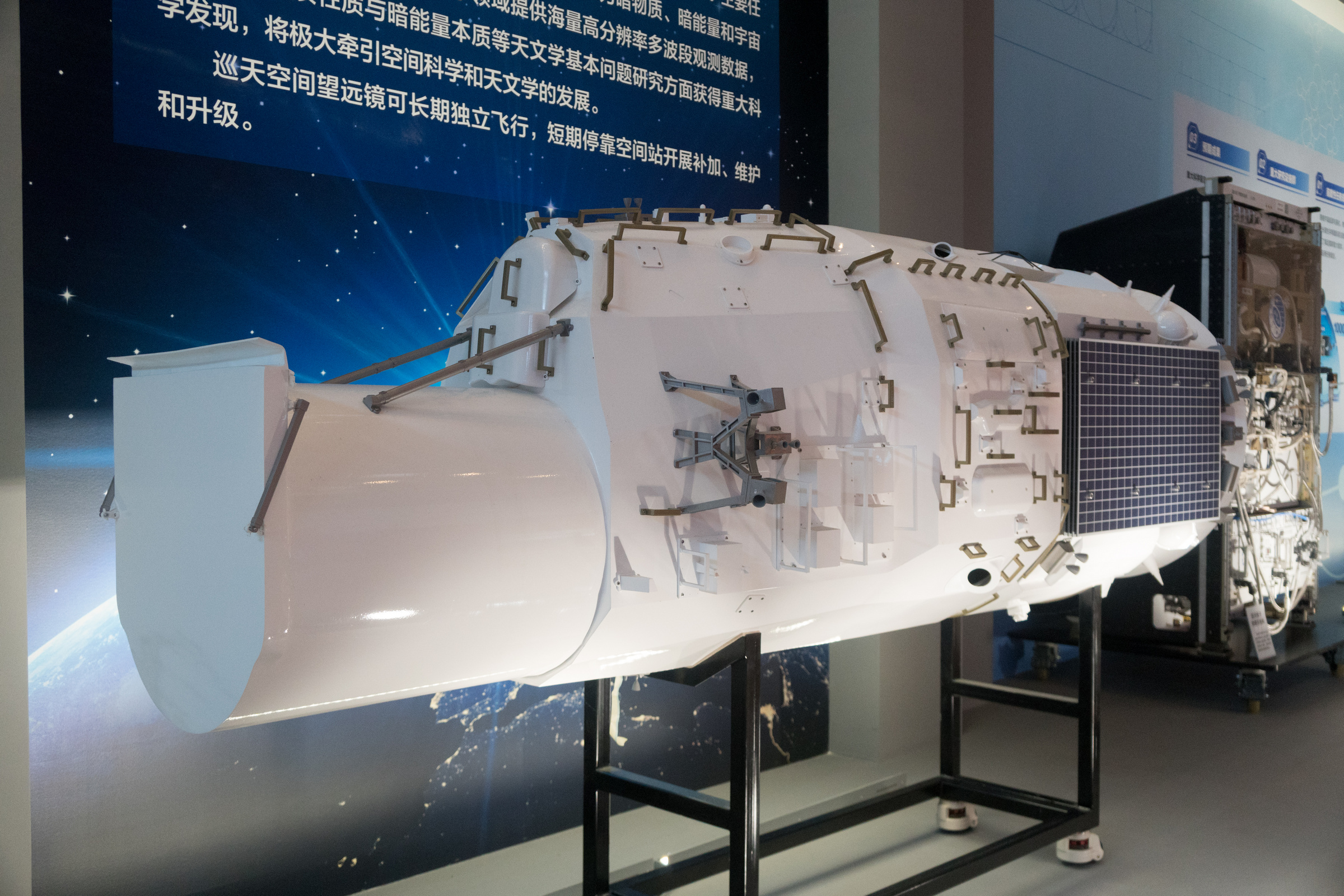
Xuntian mockup, showing its 2-meter diameter telescope

The Xuntian or Chinese space station survey telescope (CSST) is a space telescope under development.

The telescope will feature a 2-metre (6 ft 7 in) diameter primary mirror and is expected to have a field of view approximately 300 to 350 times larger than that of the Hubble Space Telescope. Its 2.5-gigapixel camera is designed to survey up to 40 percent of the sky over its minimum ten year service life.

As of 2026, Xuntian is scheduled for launch in 2027 aboard a Long March 5B rocket. It is planned to co-orbit with the station, allowing periodic docking for servicing and maintenance.

== Construction ==
=== Planning ===
In 2011, it was announced that the future space station was planned to be assembled from 2020 to 2022. By 2013, the space station's core module was planned to be launched earlier, in 2018, followed by the first laboratory module in 2020, and a second in 2022. By 2018, it was reported that this had slipped to 2020–2023. In February 2020, a total of 11 launches were planned for the whole construction phase, beginning in 2021. In 2021, it was reported China National Space Administration planned to complete the construction of the space station in 2022.

Tiangong modules are self-contained and pre-assembled, in contrast to the US Orbital Segment of the ISS, which required spacewalking to interconnect cables, piping, and structural elements manually. The assembly method of the station can be compared with the Soviet-Russian Mir space station and the Russian orbital segment of the International Space Station, making China the second nation to develop and use automatic rendezvous and docking for modular space station construction. The technologies in the construction are derived from decades of Chinese crewed spaceflight experiences, including those gained from Tiangong-1 and Tiangong-2 prototypes, as well as the purchase of aerospace technology from Russia in the early 1990s. A representative of the Chinese crewed space program stated that around 2000, China and Russia were engaged in technological exchanges regarding the development of a docking mechanism used for space stations. Deputy Chief Designer, Huang Weifen, stated that near the end of 2009, CMSA began to train astronauts on how to dock spacecraft.

In accordance to the plan, by the end of 2022, the fully assembled Tiangong space station had three 22 metric-ton modules in a basic T-shape. Because of the modular design, the Tiangong space station can be further expanded into six modules possibly enabling more astronaut participation in the future.

=== Assembly ===
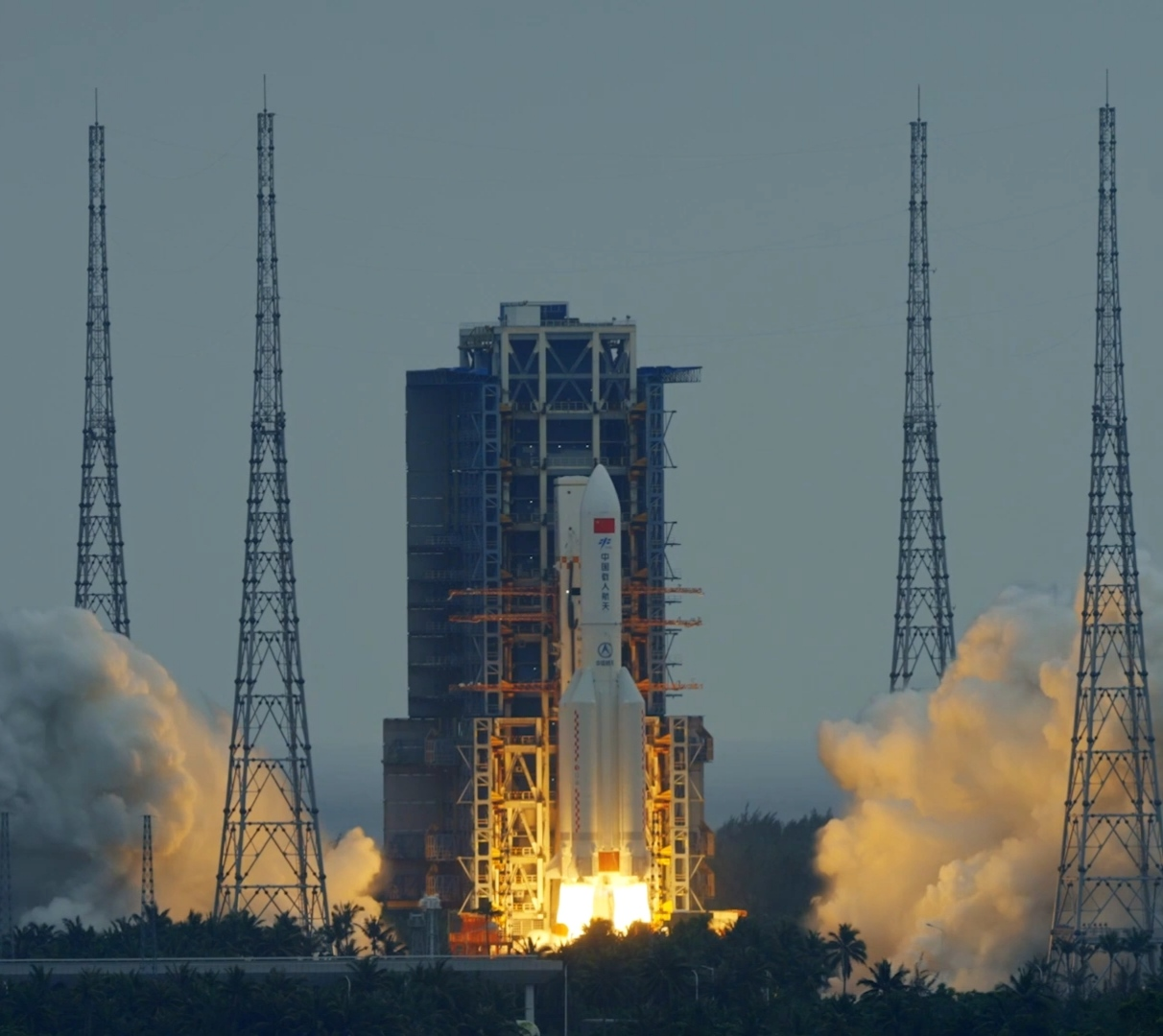
Long March 5B launching the Tianhe core module in April 2021

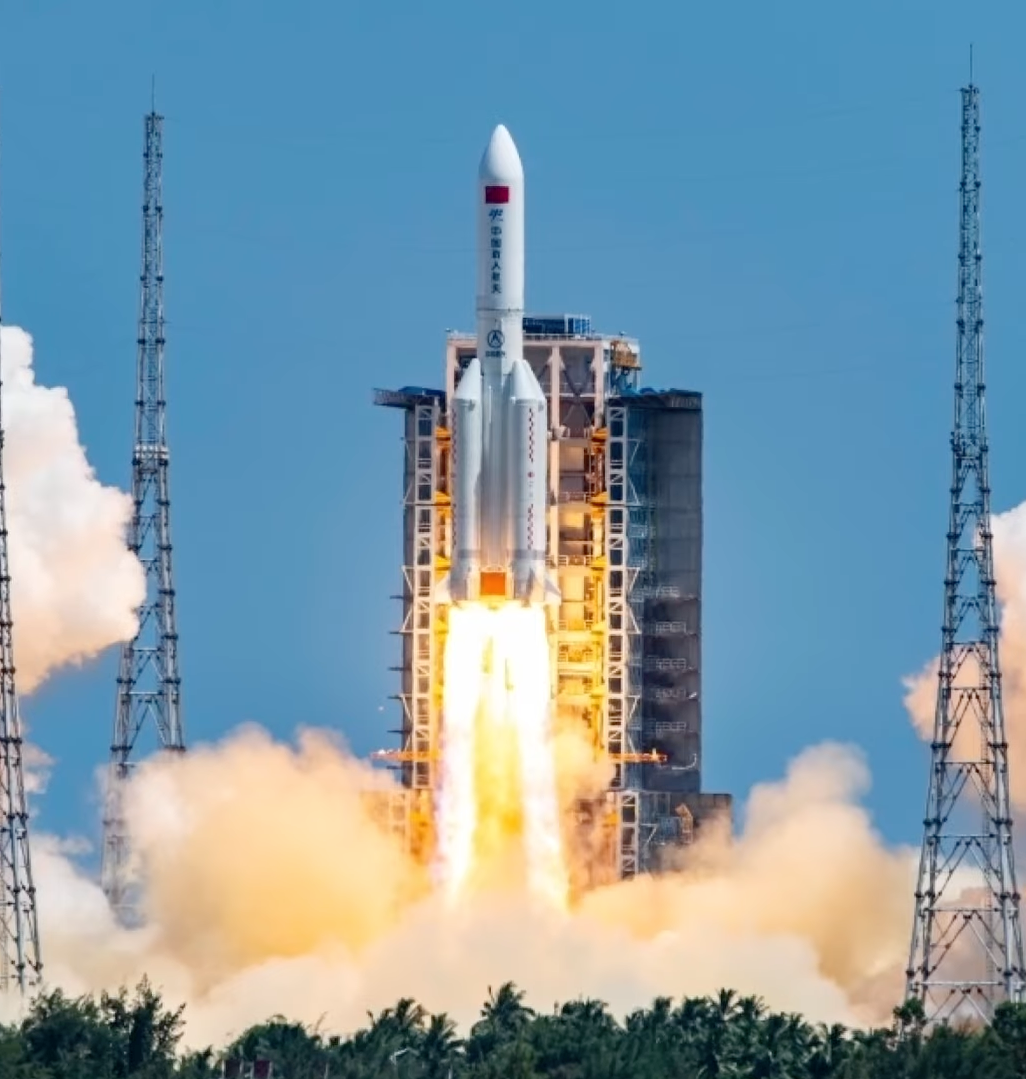
Long March 5B launching the Wentian experiment module in July 2022

Animation showing an "indexing robotic arm" relocating Wentian from the forward (top) to the starboard port of Tianhe (right)

The construction of the Chinese Space Station officially began in April 2021. The planned 11 missions include three module launches, four crewed missions, and four autonomous cargo flights. On 29 April 2021, the first component of the station, the Tianhe core module, was launched to orbit aboard the Long March 5B rocket from Wenchang Spacecraft Launch Site. On 29 May 2021, the Tianzhou 2 autonomous cargo spacecraft was launched to the Tianhe core module in preparation for the Shenzhou 12 crew, who will be responsible for testing Tianhe's various systems and preparing for future operations. On 17 June 2021, Shenzhou 12 docked with the space station, marking them the first visitors to the Tiangong station. The crew began the examination of the core module and verification of key technologies. On 4 July 2021, Liu Boming and Tang Hongbo began their first spacewalk in upgraded Chinese Feitian spacesuits, outfitting the space stations with extravehicular activity (EVA) equipment, such as foot restraints and a standing platform for the Core Module Manipulator (CMM). Shenzhou 12 commander Nie Haisheng stayed inside the station and tested the robotic arm movements. Liu Boming and Nie Haisheng completed the second spacewalk on 20 August 2021 and installed various devices outside of the station, including a thermal control system, a panoramic camera, and other equipment. On 16 September 2021, the Shenzhou 12 crew entered their return spacecraft and undocked from Tianhe. Before leaving the orbit, the crew performed various radial rendezvous (R-Bar) maneuvers to circumnavigate around the space station. They tested the guidance system and recorded lighting conditions while approaching the Tianhe from different angles. The crew landed in the Gobi Desert of Inner Mongolia on the same day. The Tianzhou 3 cargo spacecraft, which arrived at the launch facility a month earlier, was immediately rolled out onto the launch pad for the next supply mission.

On 20 September 2021, the Tianzhou 3 autonomous freighter was launched from the Wenchang Satellite Launch Center in preparation for the arrival of the Shenzhou 13 crew. Shenzhou 13 was the first six-month mission on the Tiangong station, whereas Shenzhou 12 was only three months in length. The Shenzhou 13 spacecraft docked with the space station on 15 October 2021. Missions for the Shenzhou 13 crew included orbit experiments, spacewalks, and for the station's future expansion. On 7 November 2021, Shenzhou 13 crew Zhai Zhigang and Wang Yaping conducted the first spacewalks to test the next-generation EVA suit and the CMM, making Wang Yaping China's first female spacewalker. One of the missions in the 6.5-hour extravehicular activity was to install a dual-arm connector to the 10-metre-long (33 ft) robotic arm, providing the capability for CMM to extend in length with another 5-metre-long (16 ft) segment mounted on the Wentian module. According to Gao Shen of the China Academy of Space Technology (CAST), the combined 15-metre (49 ft) CMM will have greater range and weight-carrying capacity. During spacewalks, various preparations were performed on the robotic arm for manipulation and construction of future modules.

On 26 December 2021, Shenzhou 13 crew Zhai Zhigang and Ye Guangfu conducted the second spacewalk to install a panoramic camera, which will be used for space station monitoring and robotic arm observation. They also practiced various movements with the help of the CMM controlled by monitoring astronaut Wang Yaping inside the station. During the construction phase of the station in 2021, according to documents filed by China Manned Space Agency (CMSA) with the United Nations Office for Outer Space Affairs and reported by Reuters, the station had two "close encounters" with SpaceX's Starlink satellites on 1 July and 21 October, with the station conducting evasive adjustment maneuvers. On 5 January 2022, Shenzhou 13 team used the 10-meter long CMM to relocate the Tianzhou 2 supply ship by 20 degrees before returning it to the original location. This maneuver was conducted to practice the procedures, equipment, and backup operation system needed for future module assembly. On 13 January, the crew tested the emergency docking system by controlling the cargo spacecraft manually. In March 2022, the crew began preparations to undock from the space station. The crew landed in China on 16 April 2022, after staying 182 days in low-Earth orbit. Soon after, China launched the Tianzhou 4 cargo spacecraft in preparation for the next crewed mission in May. The automated freighter docked with the space station on 9 May 2022, and carried vital maintenance equipment and a refrigerator for scientific experiment.

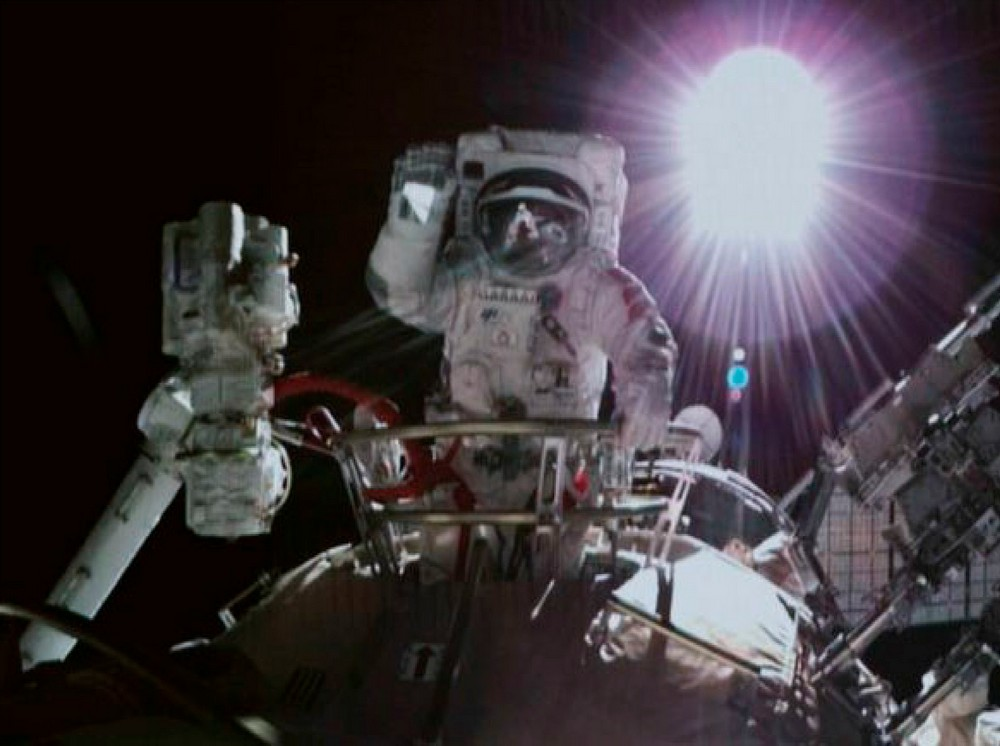
Zhai Zhigang of the Shenzhou 13 crew conducting a spacewalk outside the station on 7 November 2021

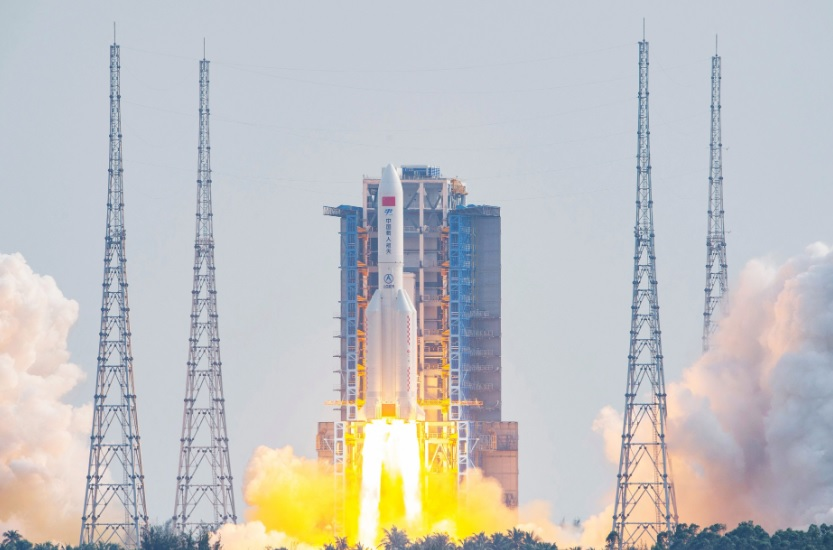
Long March 5B launching the Mengtian experiment module in October 2022

Beginning with Shenzhou 14, China officially started the final construction phase for the space station, with three astronauts tasked to oversee the arrival of two laboratory modules in 2022. On 5 June 2022, the Shenzhou 14 crew arrived at the space station, docking at the Earth-facing nadir port. The Shenzhou 14 crew began the assembly for both the Wentian and Mengtian modules, which arrived in the second half of 2022. The crew installed a carbon dioxide reduction system for the space station, tested their Feitian spacesuits, and debugged the Tianhe core module. On 19 July 2022, Tianzhou 3 was undocked from the station, making way for the arrival of the Wentian module. On 24 July 2022, the Wentian laboratory module was launched from the Wenchang space centre and rendezvoused with the Tianhe core module on the same day. Wentian is the second module for the Tiangong space station, and the first laboratory cabin module (LCM). The module is equipped with an airlock cabin, which will become the primary entry-exit point for future EVAs. The module also features backup avionics, propulsion, and life support systems, improving the Tiangong space station's operational redundancy. On 2 September 2022, crew members Chen Dong and Liu Yang performed their first spacewalk from the new Wentian airlock, installing and adjusting various external equipment as well as testing emergency return procedures. On 17 September 2022, astronauts Chen Dong and Cai Xuzhe performed the mission's second spacewalk, installing external pumps and verified emergency rescue capability. On 30 September 2022, all crew members worked in coordination, moving the Wentian module from the forward port to the starboard lateral docking port, its planned permanent location, on 30 September 2022 at 04:44 UTC. The relocation process was largely automated with the assistance of the indexing robotic arm. In October 2022, CMSA prepared to launch the third and final module, Mengtian, to complete the construction for the Tiangong space station.

On 31 October 2022, the Mengtian module was launched from the Wenchang space centre, and docked with the station 13 hours later. The assembly of the Mengtian marked the final step in the 1.5-year construction process. According to the China Academy of Space Technology, the rendezvous and docking process for Mengtian was conducted expeditiously, as the-then L-shaped Tiangong station consumed large amounts of energy to stay oriented in its asymmetrical arrangement. On 3 November 2022, Mengtian was relocated autonomously from the forward docking port to the port-side lateral docking port via the indexing robotic arm, and successfully berthed at its planned permanent location with the Tianhe module at 01:32UTC (9:32BJT), forming a T-shape. Subsequently, CMSA announced the construction of the Tiangong space station as officially complete. The designer of Mengtian module, Li Guangxing, explained that the space station was maneuvered to a special position, utilizing the Earth's gravity to help stabilize the docking process. At 07:12 UTC, the Shenzhou 14 crew entered the Mengtian module. On 10 November 2022, the Tianzhou 4 cargo spacecraft undocked from the Tiangong, and Tianzhou 5 was prepared to launch on the same day. Tianzhou 5 was launched on 12 November 2022, carrying supplies, experiments, and microsatellites to the space station. It also contained gifts for China's first crew handover ceremony in orbit. The completed station had extra capacity for expanded crew activities and living space for six, allowing crew rotation. On 29 November 2022, the Shenzhou 15 crew, Fei Junlong, Deng Qingming, and Zhang Lu, were launched to the space station. The crew spent one week together for a handover and verifications for sustainable six-man operations. With the crew rotation operation, China commenced its permanent space presence.

On 17 December 2024, Cai Xuzhe broke the record with Song Lingdong for the longest spacewalk in human history, of 9 hours and 6 minutes, with the assistance of the space station's robotic arms and ground-based scientific personnel, completed tasks such as the installation of space debris protection devices, inspection, and maintenance of external equipment and facilities.

=== Expansion ===
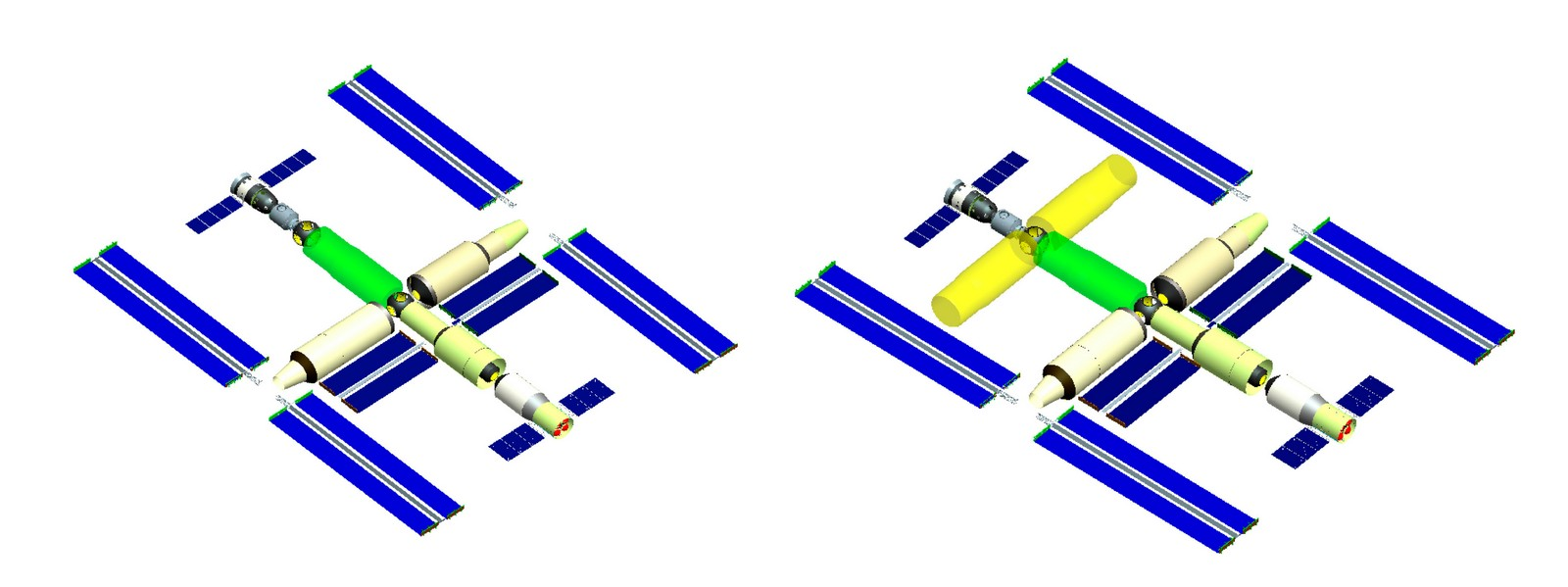
Possible future expansion of Tiangong space station

According to CMSA, the Tiangong space station is expected to be expanded from three to six modules, with improved versions of the Tianhe, Wentian, and Mengtian modules.

According to Wang Xiang, commander of the space station system at the China Academy of Space Technology (CAST), the potential next phase would be adding a new core module. "Following our current design, we can continue to launch an extension module to dock with the forward section of the space station, and the extension module can carry a new hub for docking with the subsequent space vehicles," Wang told CCTV. In October 2023, CAST presented new plan on the 74th International Astronautical Congress to expand the Tiangong to 180 tons, six-module assembly, with at least 15 years of operational life. A multi-functional module with six docking ports was planned as the foundation for the expansion. New sections included 3D printers, robots, improved robotic arms, and space debris observation, detection, and warning systems.

The Xuntian space telescope, which will orbit independently of the station but is capable of docking with Tiangong, is planned to launch in 2027.

== International cooperation ==
After Shenzhou 5, US commentators perceived an increase in China's chances of joining the International Space Station program. In 2007, China formally requested to join the International Space Station program. However, in 2011, the US Congress approved the Wolf Amendment, which prohibits NASA from engaging in direct cooperation with Chinese space agencies, effectively excluding China from the International Space Station, incentivizing the Tiangong program.

Roscosmos, Russia's space agency, and the European Space Agency (ESA), two of NASA's ISS partners, expressed intentions to cooperate with China in space. Between 2007 and 2011, Russia, Europe, and China collaborated on the Mars500 project, a ground-based simulation complementing ISS-based preparations for a human mission to Mars.

Tiangong hosts international experiments from 17 countries across 23 institutions, including Belgium, France, Germany, India, Italy, Japan, Mexico, the Netherlands, Peru, Russia, Saudi Arabia, and Spain. The United Nations Office for Outer Space Affairs was involved in selecting nine of these international experiments.

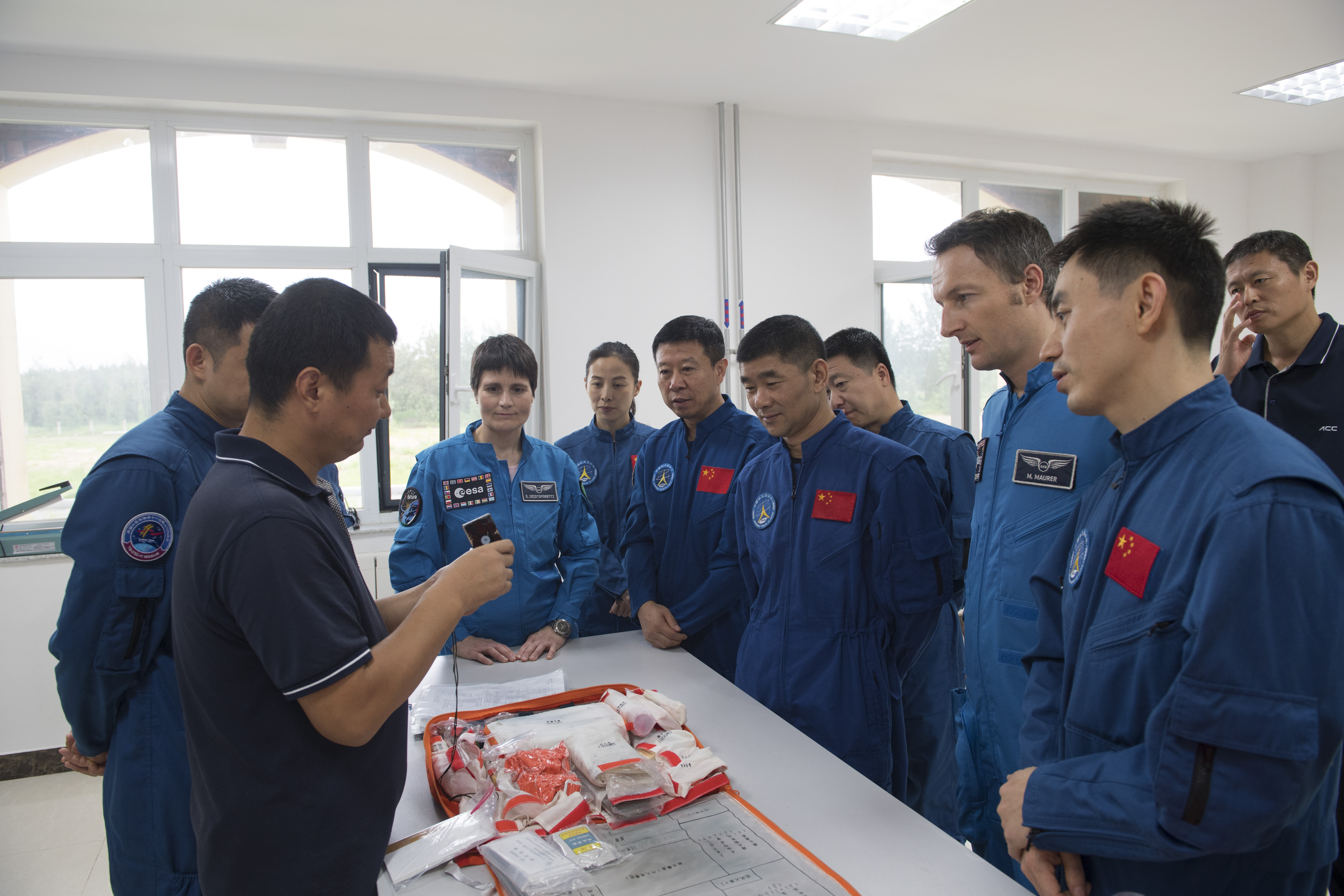
ESA and CMSA astronauts training together at the Astronaut Center of China, on 14 August 2017

ESA began astronaut training with the China Manned Space Agency (CMSA) in 2017, preparing selected astronauts for potential Tiangong missions, including survival training, language instruction, and spacecraft operations. In January 2023, ESA announced it would no longer send astronauts to Tiangong due to political and financial considerations.

Following the launch of Tiangong's first module in 2021, CMSA stated that multiple countries had expressed interest in sending astronauts to the station and that future foreign participation would be supported. Chinese officials have indicated that Chinese and foreign astronauts are expected to work together once the station is fully operational.

In October 2022, CMSA opened astronaut selection to residents of Hong Kong and Macau. As of late 2025, one astronaut from each region is expected to launch to Tiangong in 2026 as payload specialists. Lai Ka-ying, a former Hong Kong Police Force officer, became the first Hong Kong resident to enter space, on 25 May 2026, flying aboard Shenzhou 23.

In 2025, China and Pakistan signed an agreement to send a Pakistani astronaut to Tiangong on a short-duration mission. In April 2026, two Pakistan Air Force pilots were selected to begin training at the Astronaut Center of China in Beijing. One of these pilots is expected to launch aboard Shenzhou 24 in November 2026 and visit the station for a week.

== Life aboard ==
=== Crew activities ===
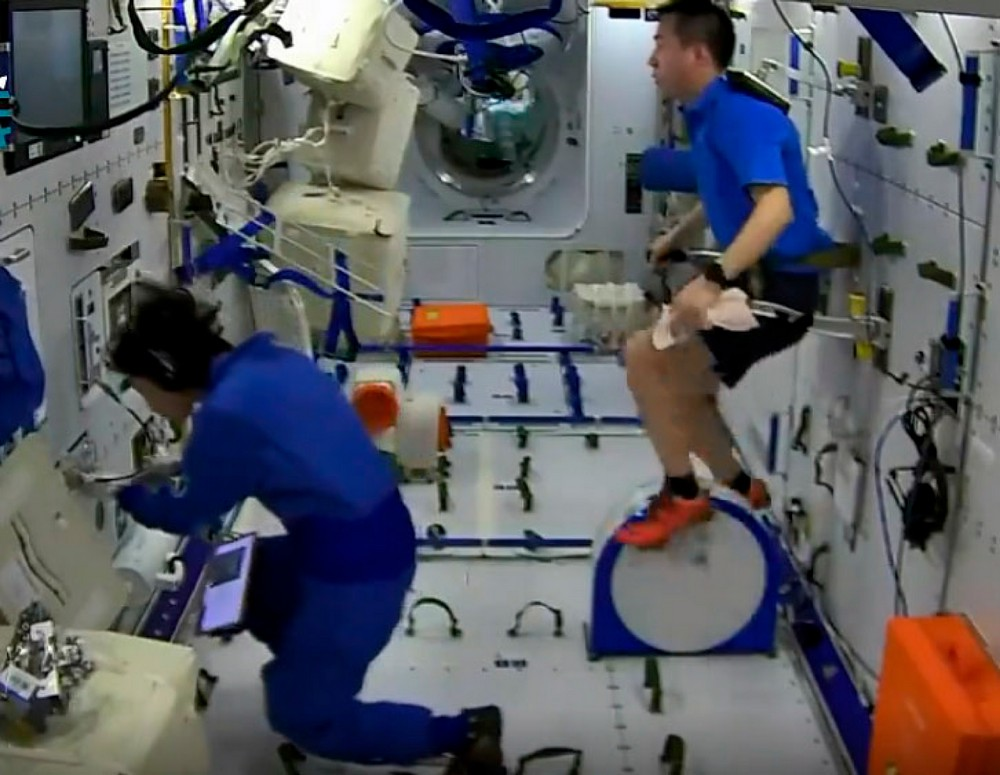
Interior of the Wentian lab module

Astronauts on the Tiangong station follow China Standard Time (CST) for their daily schedule. The crew often wakes up around 7:00 and begins their daily conference with Mission Control in Beijing before starting work at 08:00 (00:00UTC). The crew will then follow their planned schedule until 21:00, after which they report their work progress to Mission Control. At 13:30, astronauts enter their living quarters to take a nap, which typically takes an hour. The crew also has multiple breaks for eating and resting. The Tiangong station features a lighting scene function to simulate lighting conditions on Earth, including daylight, dusk, and night. As the station experiences 16 sunrises and sunsets per day in low Earth orbit, this function helps to avoid disruption to the crew's circadian rhythm.

The Tiangong space station is fitted with home automation functions, including remote-controlled appliances and a logistics management system. The crew can use their tablet computers to identify, locate, and organize items inside the station, as all items in the station are marked by QR codes. This will help ensure an orderly environment as more cargo arrives. Inter-device communication inside the station is completely wireless via the Wi-Fi network to avoid a cord mess.

=== Food and personal hygiene ===
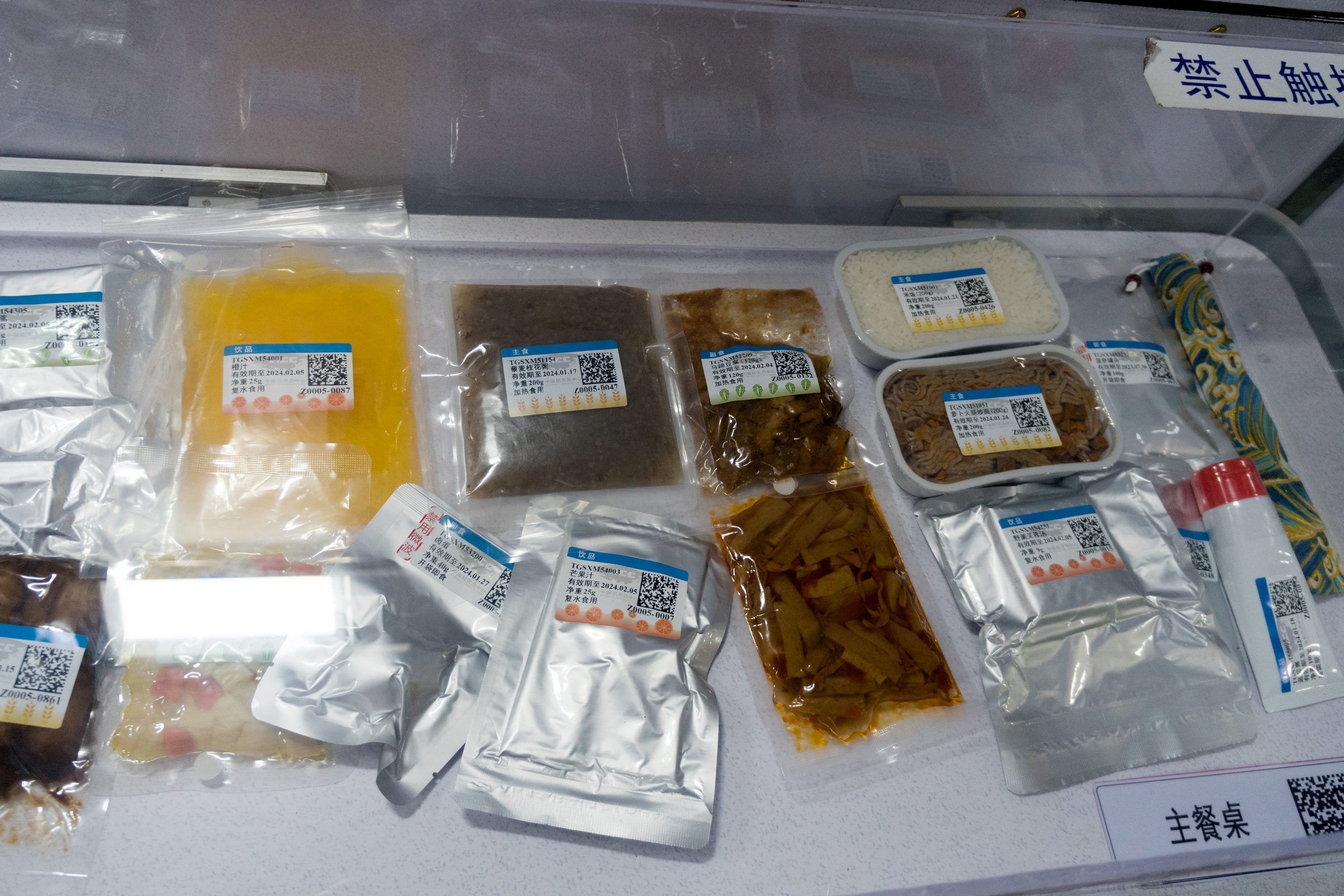
Space food for Tiangong space station

Meals consisting of 120 different types of food, selected based on astronauts' preferences, are stored aboard. Staples including shredded pork in garlic sauce, kung pao chicken, black pepper beef, yuxiang shredded pork, pickled cabbage, and beverages, including a variety of teas and juices, are resupplied by trips of the Tianzhou robotic cargo spacecraft. Fresh fruit and vegetables are stored in coolers. Huang Weifen, the chief astronaut trainer of CMSA, explains that most of the food is prepared to be solid, boneless, and in small pieces. Condiments such as pork sauce and Sichuan pepper sauce are used to compensate for the changes in the sense of taste in microgravity. The station is equipped with a small kitchen table for food preparation, a refrigerator, a water dispenser, and the first-ever microwave oven in spaceflight so that astronauts can "always have hot food whenever they need." Following the astronauts' feedback, larger supplies of vegetables have been included since Tianzhou 4, increasing the variety of vegetable to 32. Later, Shenzhou 21 delivered an air fryer to the Tiangong, which features built-in air purification and residue collector to allow safe usage inside microgravity. The new oven allows baking and grilling of food, instead of simple reheating. Chinese astronauts cooked barbecue chicken wings and grilled steak with it.

The station's core module, Tianhe, provides the living quarters for the crew members, consisting of three separate sleeping berths, a space toilet, shower facility, and gym equipment. Each berth features one small circular window, a headphone set, ventilation, and other amenities. Neuromuscular electrical stimulation is used to prevent muscle atrophy. The noise level in the working area is set at 58 decibels, while in the sleeping area, the noise is kept at 49 decibels. The ventilation system provides air circulation to the crew, with 0.08 m/s wind speed for the working areas and 0.05 m/s for the sleeping stations. Three additional living quarters for short-term stay are located in the Wentian laboratory module.

== Operations ==
Since 5 June 2022, Tiangong has been a permanently crewed station, typically staffed with a crew of three but capable of supporting up to six people. Operations are controlled from the Beijing Aerospace Flight Control Center in China.

=== Crewed missions ===
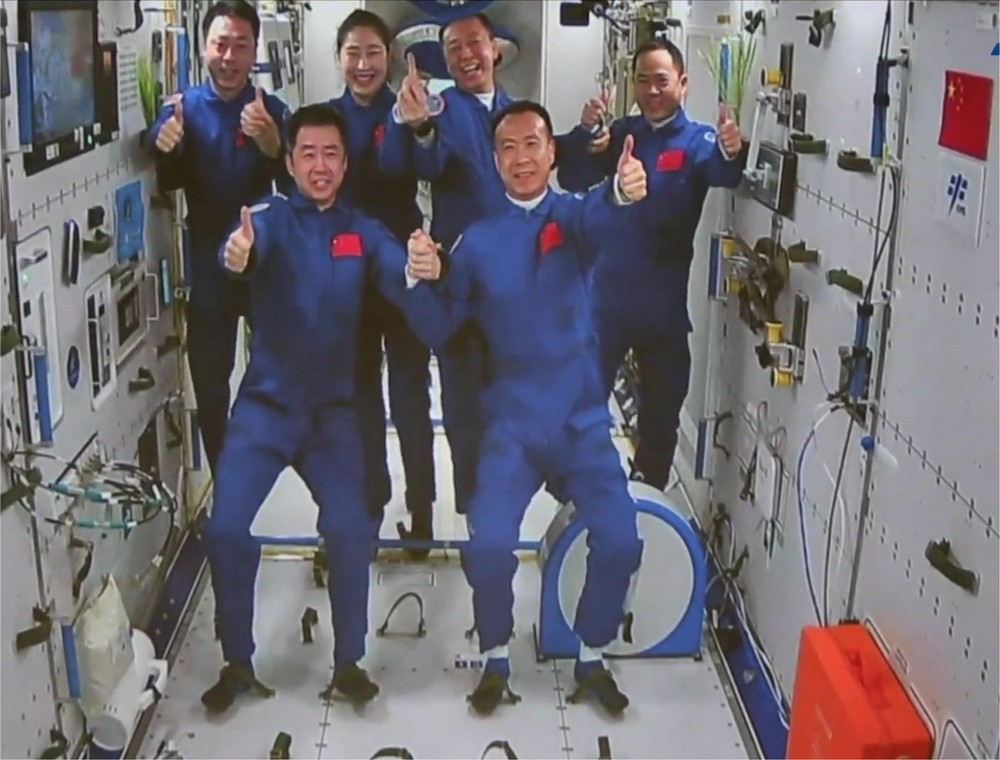
Two crews aboard Tiangong during the first handover, 30 November 2022

The first crewed mission to Tiangong, Shenzhou 12, lasted 90 days, while missions from Shenzhou 13 onward have typically lasted about 180 days. Beginning with the transition between Shenzhou 14 and Shenzhou 15, overlapping "handover" periods have been used to ensure the station remains continuously inhabited.

China maintains a contingency protocol—often described as "one launch, one on standby"—under which a Shenzhou spacecraft and Long March 2F rocket for the next planned mission are kept in a near-ready state at Jiuquan. This capability was first used in 2025, when the Shenzhou 20 crew was expected to return to Earth following the arrival of Shenzhou 21. Due to suspected space debris damage, the spacecraft's return was delayed, and the crew instead returned on 14 November aboard Shenzhou 21 instead. In turn, the launch of Shenzhou 22, originally intended for the subsequent crew rotation, was launched months early to be available to the crew that arrived on Shenzhou 21.

The CMSA is developing a next-generation crewed spacecraft, Mengzhou, to eventually replace Shenzhou. The reusable capsule is designed for missions to both Tiangong and the Moon. It is larger than Shenzhou, can carry up to six or seven astronauts, and includes cargo storage capable of returning materials to Earth—unlike Shenzhou or the Tianzhou cargo spacecraft. The first uncrewed test flight of Mengzhou to Tiangong is expected in late 2026.

=== Cargo resupply ===
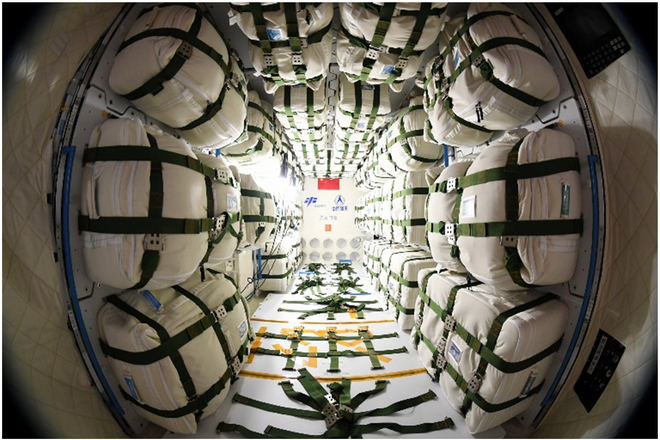
Cargo packages loaded on Tianzhou spacecraft.

Tianzhou, a modified derivative of the Tiangong-1 spacecraft, is used as robotic cargo spacecraft to resupply this station. The launch mass of Tianzhou is around 13,000 kg with a payload of around 6,000 kg. Launch, rendezvous and docking are fully autonomous, with mission control and crew used in override or monitoring roles.

In October 2024, CMSA awarded contracts to the Qingzhou cargo spacecraft, by CAS Space, and the Haolong spaceplane, by Chengdu Aircraft Research and Design Institute, to support the Tiangong space station. On 30 March 2026, a prototype version of Qingzhou was launched on the maiden flight of CAS Space's Kinetica 2 rocket.

=== List of missions ===
- All dates are UTC. Dates are the earliest possible dates and may change.
- Forward ports are at the front of the station according to its normal direction of travel and orientation (attitude). Aft is at the rear of the station, used by spacecraft to boost the station's orbit. Nadir is closest to the Earth, zenith is on top. Port is to the left if pointing one's feet towards the Earth and looking in the direction of travel; starboard to the right.

Key

Uncrewed cargo spacecraft are in light blue colour
Crewed spacecraft are in light green colour
Modules are in beige colour

Launch (UTC)	Docking (UTC)	Undocking (UTC)	Result	Spacecraft/Module	Location	Duration (Note: Duration of a spacecraft is calculated from the moment of docking with the Tianhe core module to the moment of undocking with the station.)
29 April 2021; 03:23:15	—N/a	—N/a	Success	Tianhe	—N/a	—N/a
29 May 2021; 12:55:29	29 May 2021; 21:01	27 March 2022; 07:59	Success	Tianzhou 2	Tianhe port (Note: Initially docked to aft port, moved to forward port on 18 September 2021, and then again to portside port on 6 January 2022)	301d, 10h, 58m
17 June 2021; 01:22:27	17 June 2021; 07:54	16 September 2021; 00:56	Success	Shenzhou 12	Tianhe forward	90d, 14h, 8m
20 September 2021; 07:10:11	20 September 2021; 14:08	17 July 2022; 02:59	Success	Tianzhou 3	Tianhe forward (Note: Initially docked to aft port, moved to forward port on 20 April 2022)	299d, 12h, 51m
15 October 2021; 16:23:56	15 October 2021; 22:56	15 April 2022; 16:44	Success	Shenzhou 13	Tianhe nadir	181d, 14h, 46m
9 May 2022; 17:56:37	10 May 2022; 00:54	9 November 2022; 06:55	Success	Tianzhou 4	Tianhe aft	183d, 6h, 1m
5 June 2022; 02:44:10	5 June 2022; 09:42	4 December 2022; 03:01	Success	Shenzhou 14	Tianhe nadir	181d, 14h, 11m
24 July 2022; 06:22:32	24 July 2022; 19:13	—N/a	Success	Wentian	Tianhe starboard (Note: Initially docked to forward port, it was moved to starboard berth on 30 September 2022 by the Indexing Robot Arm)	—N/a
31 October 2022; 07:37:23	31 October 2022; 20:27	—N/a	Success	Mengtian	Tianhe port (Note: Initially docked to forward port, it was moved to the port berth on 3 November 2022 by the Indexing Robot Arm)	—N/a
12 November 2022; 02:03:12	12 November 2022; 04:10	11 September 2023; 08:46	Success	Tianzhou 5	Tianhe forward (Note: Initially docked to aft port, from 5 May 2023, it was free-flying and co-orbiting the space station, then redocked to forward port on 5 June 2023)	303d, 4h, 36m
29 November 2022; 15:08:17	29 November 2022; 21:42	3 June 2023; 13:29	Success	Shenzhou 15	Tianhe forward	185d, 13h, 56m
10 May 2023; 13:22:51	10 May 2023; 21:16	12 January 2024; 08:02	Success	Tianzhou 6	Tianhe aft	246d, 10h, 46m
30 May 2023; 01:31:13	30 May 2023; 08:29	30 October 2023; 12:37	Success	Shenzhou 16	Tianhe nadir	153d, 2h, 15m
26 October 2023; 03:14:02	26 October 2023; 09:46	30 April 2024; 00:43	Success	Shenzhou 17	Tianhe forward	186d, 13h, 9m
17 January 2024; 14:27:30	17 January 2024; 17:46	10 November 2024; 08:30	Success	Tianzhou 7	Tianhe aft	297d, 14h, 44m
25 April 2024; 12:59:00	25 April 2024; 19:32	3 November 2024; 08:12	Success	Shenzhou 18	Tianhe nadir	191d, 11h, 8m
29 October 2024; 20:27:34	30 October 2024; 03:00	29 April 2025; 20:00	Success	Shenzhou 19	Tianhe forward	181d, 17h
15 November 2024; 15:13:18	15 November 2024; 18:32	8 July 2025; 07:09	Success	Tianzhou 8	Tianhe aft	234d, 12h, 37m
24 April 2025; 09:17	24 April 2025; 15:49	18 January 2026, 16:23	Partial failure (Note: Launched crewed, but landed uncrewed due to cracks in spacecraft's porthole caused by external space debris impact. Crew landed via Shenzhou 21.)	Shenzhou 20	Tianhe nadir	269d, 7h, 6m
14 July 2025; 21:34	14 July 2025; 21:34	6 May 2026; 08:34	Success	Tianzhou 9	Tianhe aft	295d, 11h
31 October 2025; 15:44	31 October 2025; 19:22	14 November 2025; 06:49	Success	Shenzhou 21	Tianhe forward	13d, 11h, 27m (Note: Landed with Shenzhou 20 crew due to cracks in Shenzhou 20 spacecraft's porthole caused by external space debris impact. Crew will land via Shenzhou 22.)
25 November 2025; 12:11	25 November 2025; 15:50	29 May 2026; 06:44	Success	Shenzhou 22	Tianhe forward	184d, 14h, 54m
11 May 2026; 00:14	11 May 2026; 05:11	TBA	In progress	Tianzhou 10	Tianhe aft	194d, 5h, 2m (in progress)
24 May 2026; 15:08	24 May 2026; 18:45	TBA	In progress	Shenzhou 23	Tianhe nadir	180d, 10h, 31m (in progress)

=== End of mission ===
Tiangong is designed to be used for 10 years, though it could be extended to 15 years and will accommodate three astronauts. CMSA crewed spacecraft use deorbital burns to slow their velocity, resulting in their re-entry to the Earth's atmosphere. Vehicles carrying a crew have a heat shield which prevents the vehicle's destruction caused by aerodynamic heating upon contact with the Earth's atmosphere. The station itself has no heat-shield; however, small parts of space stations can reach the surface of the Earth, so uninhabited areas will be targeted for de-orbit manoeuvres.

== Visibility ==
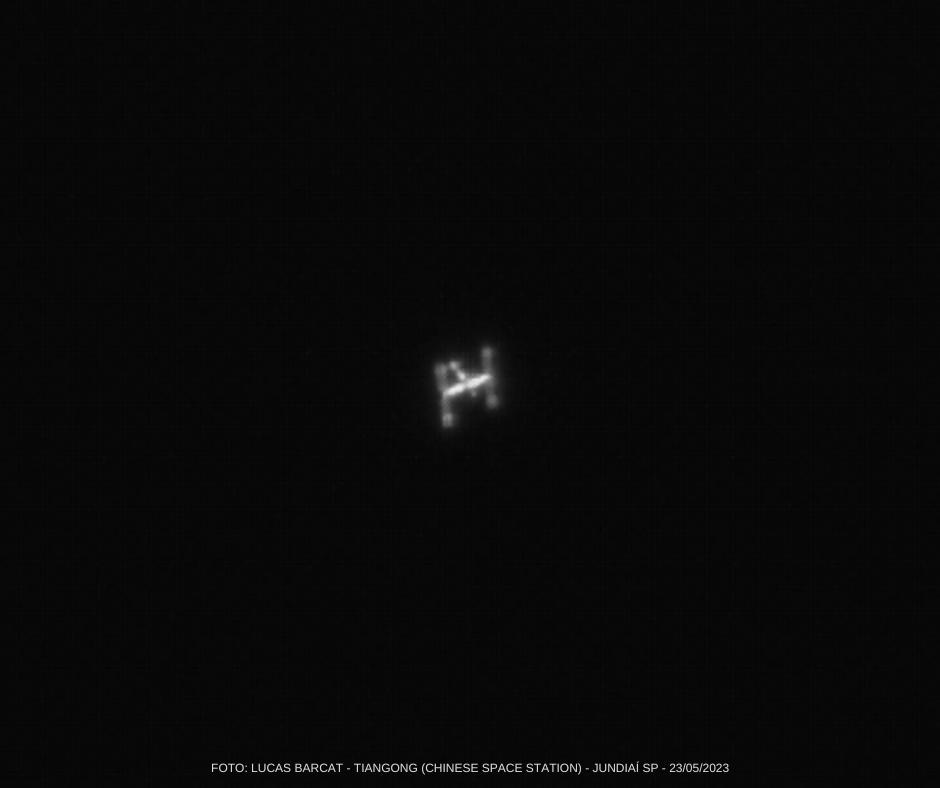
Photograph of Tiangong captured in Brazil

Like the ISS, the Tiangong space station can be seen from Earth with the naked eye due to satellite flare, caused by the reflection of sunlight off the modules and solar panels. It is visible for a few hours after sunset and before sunrise, reaching a brightness magnitude of at least -2.2 mag, similar to Jupiter's mean brightness.

== See also ==
- International Space Station – Modular space station in low Earth orbit
- List of space stations
- Politics of outer space – Political considerations of space policy
- Science diplomacy – International scientific cooperation
