= Tianzhou 4 =

2022 Chinese resupply spaceflight to the Tiangong Space Station

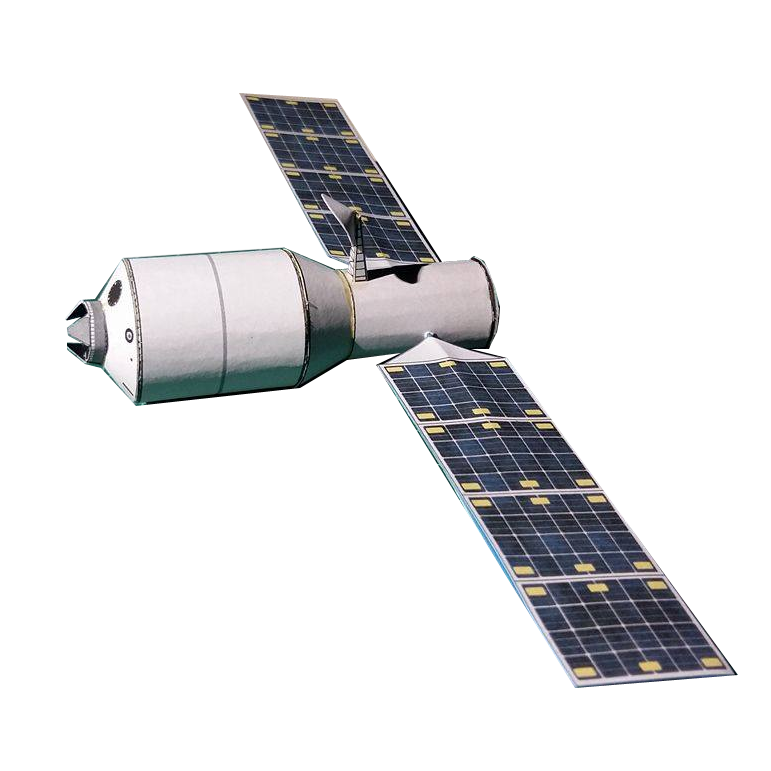
- A 1:144 scale paper model of a Tianzhou spacecraft
- Mission type: Tiangong space station resupply
- Operator: China National Space Administration
- COSPAR ID: 2022-050A
- SATCAT no.: 52509
- Mission duration: 189 days, 5 hours and 25 minutes

Spacecraft properties
- Spacecraft type: Tianzhou
- Manufacturer: China Aerospace Science and Technology Corporation
- Dry mass: 6,640 kg (14,640 lb)
- Dimensions: 10.6 × 3.35 m (34.8 × 11.0 ft)

Start of mission
- Launch date: 9 May 2022, 17:56:37 UTC (10 May, 01:56:37 CST)
- Rocket: Long March 7 (Y5)
- Launch site: Wenchang, LC-201
- Contractor: China Academy of Launch Vehicle Technology

End of mission
- Disposal: Deorbited
- Destroyed: 14 November 2022, 23:21 UTC

Orbital parameters
- Reference system: Geocentric orbit
- Regime: Low Earth orbit
- Perigee altitude: 380 km (240 mi)
- Apogee altitude: 386 km (240 mi)
- Inclination: 41.46°

Docking with Tiangong space station
- Docking port: Tianhe aft
- Docking date: 10 May 2022, 00:54 UTC
- Undocking date: 9 November 2022, 06:55 UTC
- Time docked: 183 days, 6 hours and 1 minute
- Mission insignia Tianzhou program

Tianzhou 4 (Chinese: 天舟四号) was the fourth mission of the Tianzhou-class uncrewed cargo spacecraft, and the third resupply mission to Tiangong Space Station carrying 5 tons of cargos and 1 ton of propellant. It is the largest load capacity cargo spacecraft that is on active duty. It launched on 9 May 2022, docking successfully with the Tiangong space station at the aft port 6 hours after launch. Like previous Tianzhou missions, the spacecraft launched from the Wenchang Satellite Launch Center in Hainan, China on a Long March 7 rocket.

It is a part of the construction of the Tiangong space station, and is the third cargo resupply mission to the already launched Tianhe core module (CCM).

== Spacecraft ==
The Tianzhou cargo spacecraft has several notable differences with the Tiangong-1 from which it is derived. It has only three segments of solar panels (against 4 for Tiangong), but has 4 maneuvering engines (against 2 for Tiangong).

== Mission history ==
On May 7, 2022, the combination of the Tianzhou-4 cargo spacecraft and the Long March 7 Yao-5 carrier rocket are transferred vertically to the launch area.

At 17:56 UTC on May 9, 2022, the Long March 7 Yaowu carrier rocket carrying the Tianzhou-4 cargo spacecraft was successfully launched at the Wenchang Cosmodrome in China. At about 18:06 UTC, the spacecraft and the rocket successfully separated and entered the predetermined orbit, and at 18:23 UTC, the spacecraft's solar sail board began to work.

At 00:54 UTC on May 10, 2022, Tianzhou-4 adopted the autonomous rapid rendezvous and docking mode to successfully dock with the space station Tianhe and the rear port of the core module.

On November 9, 2022, at 06:55 UTC, Tianzhou-4 separated from the space station in preparation for deorbiting, making way for the upcoming Tianzhou 5. It reentered the Earth's atmosphere and burned up as planned on 14 November 2022.

== Carriers ==
Tianzhou-4 loaded astronaut systems, space station systems, space application fields, cargo spacecraft systems a total of more than 200 pieces (sets) of cargo, including cargo package cargo and direct installation cargo, carrying about 750 kg of supplemental propellant, the total weight of uplink materials of about 6,000 kg, for the Shenzhou 14 crew of 3 people 6 months on orbit to stay, space station assembly and construction, space science experiments and so on to provide material support. One of the cargoes was a torque gyroscope weighing 170 kilograms, the heaviest of all the materials currently in transit. A small CubeSat stored onboard Tianzhou-4, Zhixing-3A, was successfully deployed on 13 November 2022.
