= Chang'e 3 =

Chinese lunar lander and rover (2013–Present)

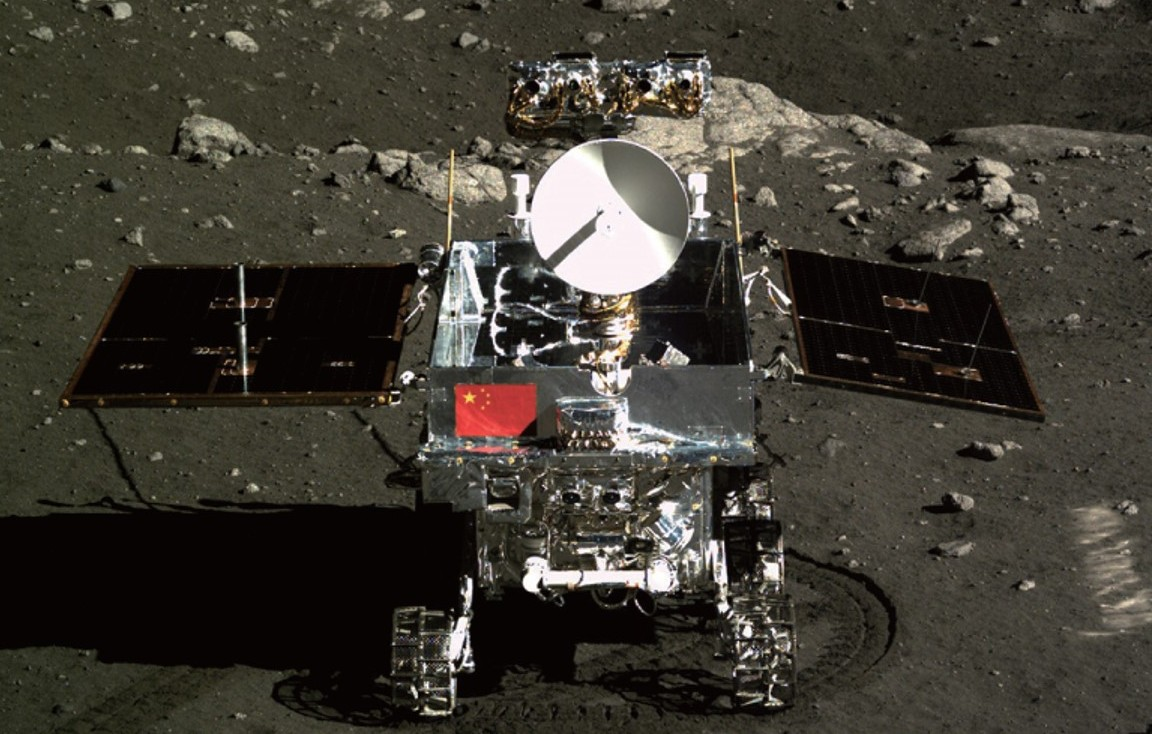
- Top: Chang'e 3 lander on the Moon; Bottom: Yutu rover on lunar surface
- Mission type: Lander and rover
- Operator: CNSA
- COSPAR ID: 2013-070A
- SATCAT no.: 39458
- Mission duration: Lander: 1 year (planned); 12 years, 233 days (elapsed); Rover: 3 months (planned); 2 years, 230 days (final)

Spacecraft properties
- Manufacturer: China Academy of Space Technology (CAST)
- BOL mass: 3,780 kg (8,330 lb)
- Landing mass: 1,200 kg (2,600 lb); Rover: 140 kg (310 lb)
- Dimensions: Rover: 1.5 m (4.9 ft) long, 1.0 m high

Start of mission
- Launch date: 17:30, 1 December 2013 (UTC)
- Rocket: Long March 3B Y-23
- Launch site: Xichang LC-2
- Contractor: CALT

Lunar lander
- Spacecraft component: Chang'e 3
- Landing date: 13:11, 14 December 2013 (UTC)
- Landing site: Mare Imbrium; 44.1214°N 19.5116°W

Lunar rover
- Spacecraft component: Yutu-1
- Landing date: 13:11, 14 December 2013 (UTC)
- Landing site: Mare Imbrium
- Distance driven: 114.8 m (377 ft)

Chang'e 3 ( /tʃæŋˈʌ/; Chinese: 嫦娥三号; pinyin: Cháng'é Sānhào; lit. 'Chang'e No. 3') is a robotic lunar exploration mission operated by the China National Space Administration (CNSA), incorporating a robotic lander and China's first lunar rover. It was launched in December 2013 as part of the second phase of the Chinese Lunar Exploration Program. The mission's chief commander was Ma Xingrui.

The spacecraft was named after Chang'e, the goddess of the Moon in Chinese mythology, and is a follow-up to the Chang'e 1 and Chang'e 2 lunar orbiters. The rover was named Yutu (Chinese: 玉兔; lit. 'Jade Rabbit') following an online poll, after the mythological rabbit that lives on the Moon as a pet of the Moon goddess.

Chang'e 3 achieved lunar orbit on 6 December 2013 and landed on 14 December 2013, becoming the first spacecraft to soft-land on the Moon since the Soviet Union's Luna 24 in 1976 and the third country to successfully achieve the feat. On 28 December 2015, Chang'e 3 discovered a new type of basaltic rock, rich in ilmenite, a black mineral.

== Overview ==
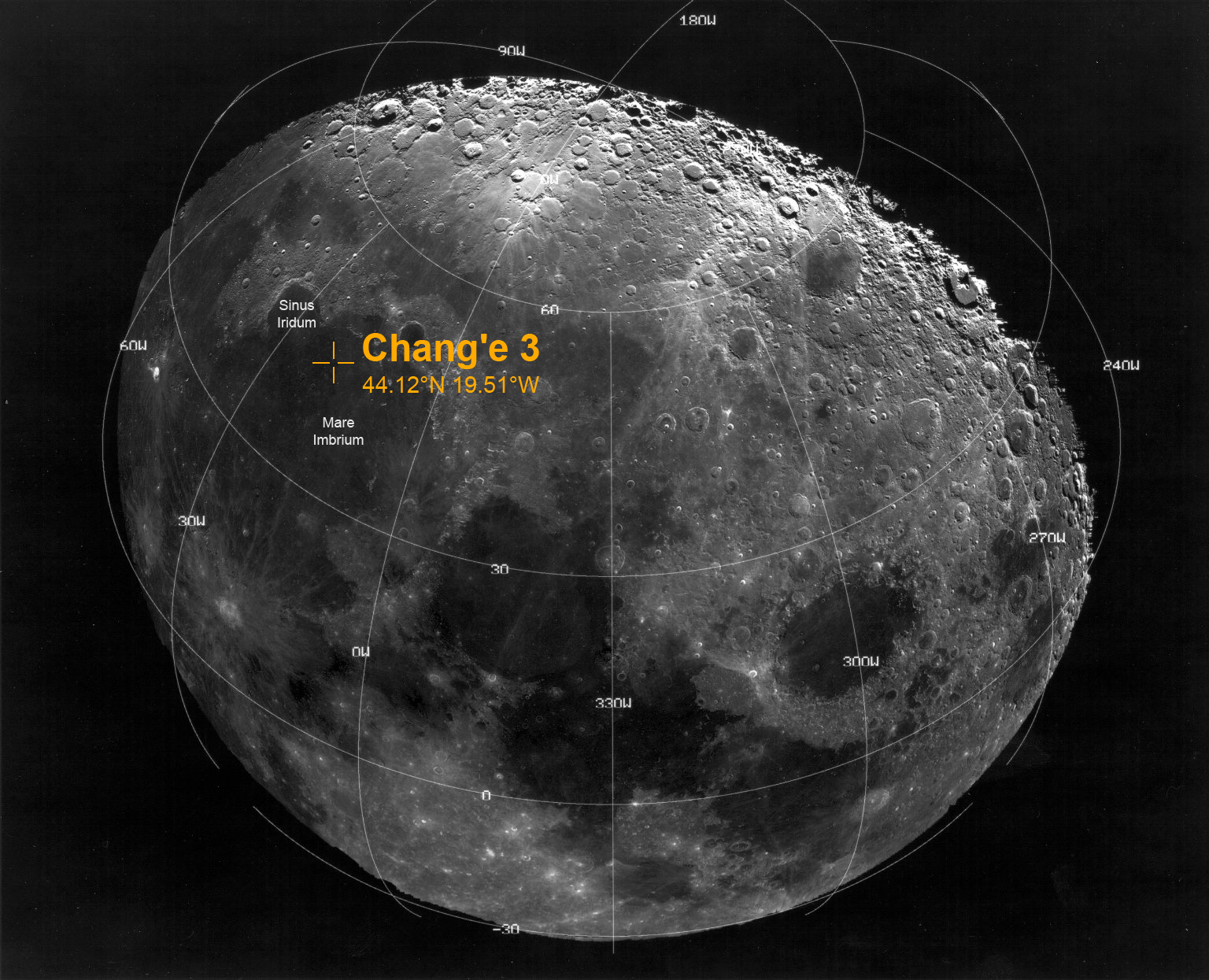
The planned landing site was Sinus Iridum, a lava-filled crater 249 km (155 mi) in diameter. The actual landing took place on Mare Imbrium.

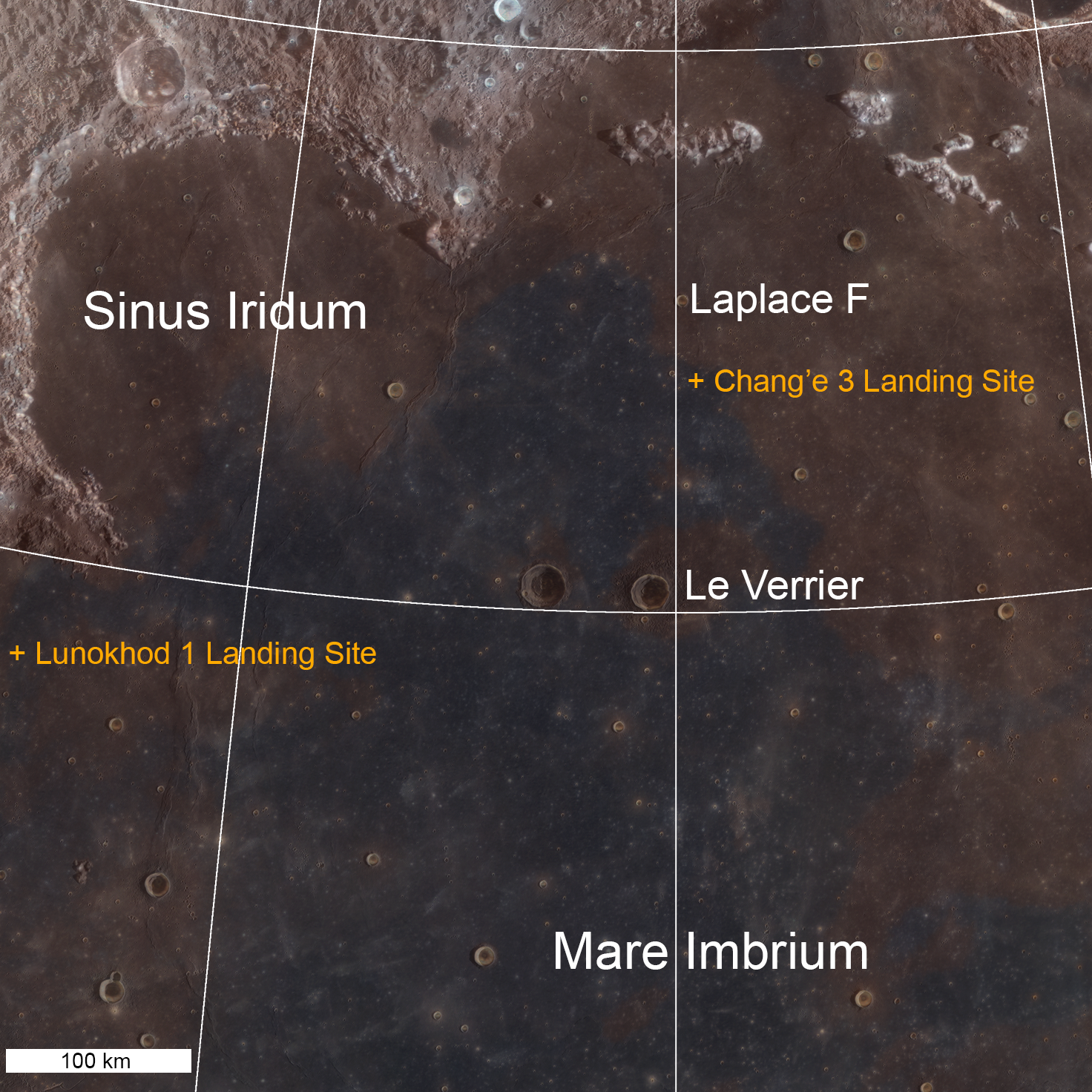
LRO image of the landing site, which is close to the transition between light and dark maria

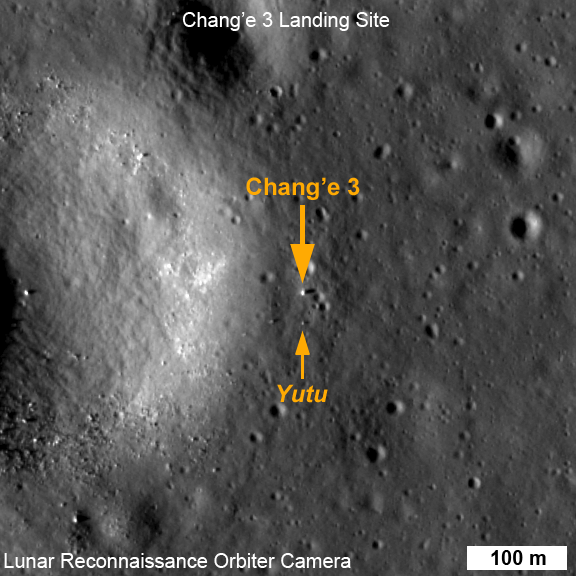
LRO close-up image taken on 25 December 2013. The lander (large arrow) and rover (small arrow) can be seen.

The Chinese Lunar Exploration Program is designed to be conducted in four phases of incremental technological advancement: The first is simply reaching lunar orbit, a task completed by Chang'e 1 in 2007 and Chang'e 2 in 2010. The second is landing and roving on the Moon, as Chang'e 3 did in 2013 and Chang'e 4 did in 2019. The third is collecting lunar samples from the near-side and sending them to Earth, a task done by Chang'e 5 and Chang'e 6 missions. The fourth phase consists of development of a robotic research station near the Moon's south pole. The program aims to facilitate a crewed lunar landing in the 2030s and possibly build an outpost near the south pole.

== History ==
In January 2004, China's lunar orbiter project was formally established. The first Chinese lunar orbiter, Chang'e 1, was launched from Xichang Satellite Launch Center on 24 October 2007 and entered lunar orbit on 5 November. The spacecraft operated until 1 March 2009, when it was intentionally crashed into the surface of the Moon. Data gathered by Chang'e 1 were used to create an accurate and high-resolution 3D map of the entire lunar surface, assisting site selection for the Chang'e 3 lander.

Chang'e 1's successor, Chang'e 2, was approved in October 2008 and was launched on 1 October 2010 to conduct research from a 100-km-high lunar orbit, in preparation for Chang'e 3's 2013 soft landing. Chang'e 2, though similar in design to Chang'e 1, was equipped with improved instruments and provided higher-resolution imagery of the lunar surface to assist in the planning of the Chang'e 3 mission. In 2012, Chang'e 2 was dispatched on an extended mission to the asteroid 4179 Toutatis.

== Objectives ==
The official mission objective is to achieve China's first soft-landing and roving exploration on the Moon, as well as to demonstrate and develop key technologies for future missions. The scientific objectives of Chang'e 3 include lunar surface topography and geology survey, lunar surface material composition and resource survey, Sun-Earth-Moon space environment detection, and lunar-based astronomical observation. Chang'e 3 will attempt to perform the first direct measurement of the structure and depth of the lunar soil down to a depth of 30 m (98 ft), and investigate the lunar crust structure down to several hundred meters deep.

The Chinese Lunar Exploration Program has been divided into three main operational phases, which are:

- Orbiting (Chang'e 1 and Chang'e 2)
- Landing (Chang'e 3 and Chang'e 4)
- Sample return (Chang'e 5 and Chang'e 6)

== Mission profile ==
=== Launch ===
Chang'e 3 was launched at 17:30 UTC on 1 December 2013 (01:30 local time on 2 December) atop a Long March 3B rocket flying from Launch Complex 2 at the Xichang Satellite Launch Centre in the southwestern province of Sichuan.

Homes downrange of the Launch Centre were damaged during liftoff when spent hardware wreckage from the rocket, including one piece the size of a desk, fell on a village in Suining County in neighbouring Hunan province. The county authorities had moved 160,000 people to safety before the liftoff, while more than 20,000 people near the launch site in Sichuan had been moved to a primary school auditorium. The expected wreckage zone for Long March rockets is 50 to 70 km (31 to 43 mi) long and 30 km (19 mi) wide.

=== Landing ===
Chang'e 3 entered a 100 km (62 mi)-high circular lunar orbit on 6 December 2013, 9:53 UTC. The orbit was obtained after 361 seconds (6 minutes) of variable thrust engine braking from its single main engine. Later, the spacecraft adopted a 15 km × 100 km (9.3 mi × 62.1 mi) elliptic orbit. The landing took place one week later, on 14 December. At periapsis, its variable thrusters were again fired in order to reduce its velocity, descending to 100 m (330 ft) above the Moon's surface. It hovered at this altitude, moving horizontally under its own guidance to avoid obstacles, before slowly descending to 4 m (13 ft) above the ground, at which point its engine was shut down for a free-fall onto the lunar surface. The landing sequence took about 12 minutes to complete.

Topographic data from the Chang'e 1 and 2 orbiters were used to select a landing site for Chang'e 3. The planned landing site was Sinus Iridum, but the lander actually descended on Mare Imbrium, about 40 km (25 mi) south of the 6 km (3.7 mi) diameter crater Laplace F, at 44.1214°N, 19.5116°W and 2,640 m (1.64 mi) elevation, on 14 December 2013, 13:11 UTC.

=== Lander ===
With a landing mass of 1,200 kg (2,600 lb), it also carried and deployed the 140 kg (310 lb) rover. It serves double-duty as a technology demonstrator to be further refined for the planned 2019 Chang'e 5 and 6 sample-return missions.

The stationary lander is equipped with a radioisotope heater unit (RHU) in order to heat its subsystems and power its operations, along with its solar panels, during its planned one-year mission. It has a scientific payload of seven instruments and cameras. In addition to their lunar scientific roles, the cameras will also acquire images of the Earth and other celestial bodies. During the 14-day lunar nights, the lander and the rover go into 'sleep mode'.

==== Lunar-based ultraviolet telescope (LUT) ====
The lander is equipped with a 50 mm (2.0 in) Ritchey–Chrétien telescope that is being used to observe galaxies, active galactic nuclei, variable stars, binaries, novae, quasars and blazars in the near-UV band (245–340 nm), and is capable of detecting objects at a brightness as low as magnitude 13. The thin exosphere and slow rotation of the Moon allow extremely long, uninterrupted observations of a target. The LUT is the first long term lunar-based astronomical observatory, making continuous observations of important celestial bodies to study their light variation and better improve current models.

==== Extreme ultraviolet (EUV) camera ====
The lander also carries an extreme ultraviolet (30.4 nm) camera, which will be used to observe the Earth's plasmasphere in order to examine its structure and dynamics and to investigate how it is affected by solar activity.

==== Lander cameras ====
Three panoramic cameras are installed on the lander, facing different directions. The lander is equipped with a single descent camera that was tested on the Chang'e 2 spacecraft.

==== Soil probe ====
The Chang'e 3 lander also carries an extensible soil probe.

=== Rover ===
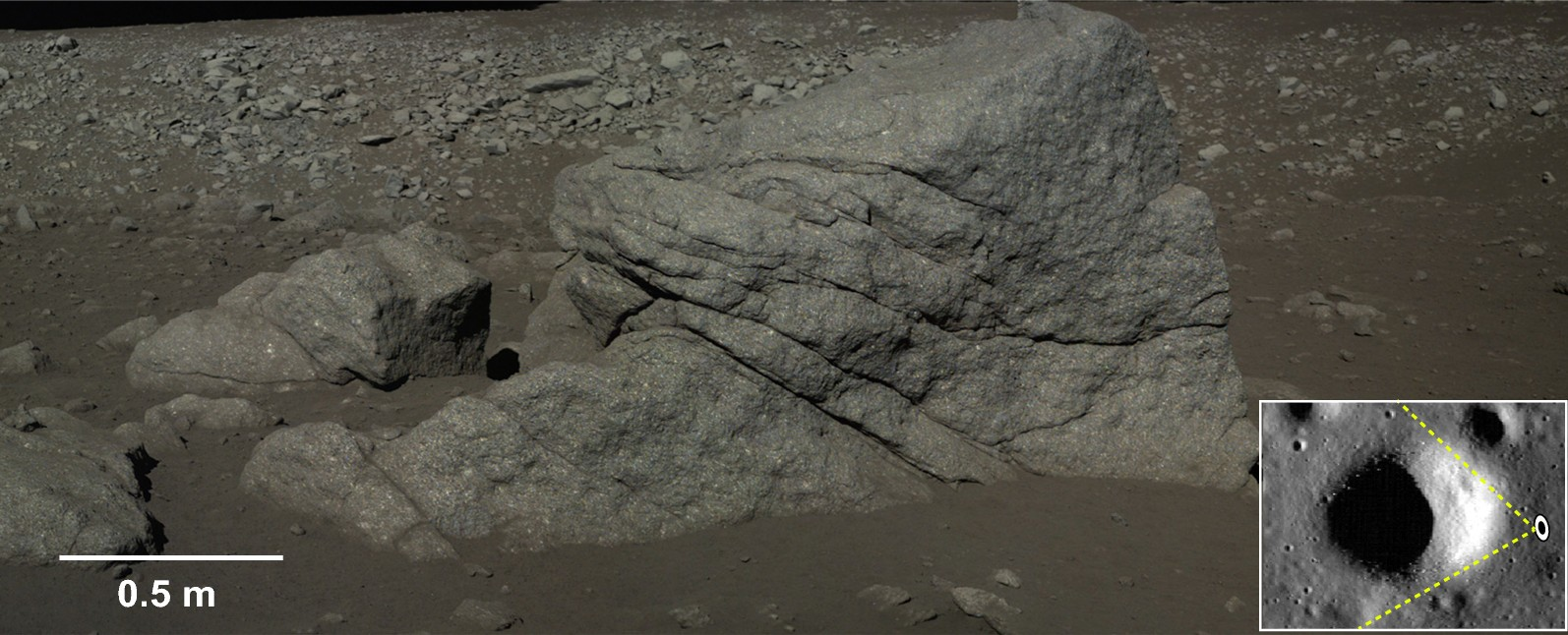
Boulders near Ziwei crater. Image captured by Yutu rover

The development of the six-wheeled rover began in 2002 at the Shanghai Aerospace System Engineering Institute and was completed in May 2010. The rover has a total mass of approximately 140 kg (310 lb), with a payload capacity of approximately 20 kg (44 lb). The rover may transmit video in real time, and can perform simple analysis of soil samples. It can navigate inclines and has automatic sensors to prevent it from colliding with other objects.

Energy was provided by 2 solar panels, allowing the rover to operate through lunar days, as well as charging its batteries. At night the rover was powered down to a large extent, and kept from getting too cold by the use of several radioisotope heater units (RHUs) using plutonium-238. The RHUs provide only thermal energy and no electricity.

The rover was deployed from the lander, and made contact with the lunar surface on 14 December, 20:35 UTC. On 17 December it was announced that all of the scientific tools apart from the spectrometers had been activated, and that both the lander and rover were "functioning as hoped, despite the unexpectedly rigorous conditions of the lunar environment". However, from 16 to 20 December the rover did not move, having shut down its subsystems. Direct solar radiation had raised the temperature on the sunlit side of the rover to over 100 °C (212 °F), while the shaded side simultaneously fell below zero. Since then, the lander and rover finished taking pictures of each other and commenced their respective science missions.

The rover was designed to explore an area of 3 square kilometres (1.2 sq mi) during its 3-month mission, with a maximum travelling distance of 10 km (6.2 mi).

The rover demonstrated its ability to endure its first lunar night when it was commanded out of sleep mode on 11 January 2014. On 25 January 2014, China's state media announced the rover had undergone a "mechanical control abnormality" caused by the "complicated lunar surface environment".

The rover established contact with mission control on 13 February 2014, but it was still suffering from a "mechanical abnormality". The rover was still intermittently transmitting as late as 6 September 2014. It ceased to transmit data in March 2015.

==== Ground-penetrating radar (GPR) ====
The rover carries a ground-penetrating radar (GPR) on its underside, allowing for the first direct measurement of the structure and depth of the lunar soil down to a depth of 30 m (98 ft), and investigation of the lunar crust structure down to several hundred meters deep.

==== Spectrometers ====
The rover carries an alpha particle X-ray spectrometer and an infrared spectrometer, intended to analyze the chemical element composition of lunar samples.

==== Stereo cameras ====
There are two panoramic cameras and two navigation cameras on the rover's mast, which stands ~1.5 m (4.9 ft) above the lunar surface, as well as two hazard avoidance cameras installed on the lower front portion of the rover. Each camera pair may be used to capture stereoscopic images, or for range imaging by triangulation.

== Monitoring by other lunar missions ==
The descent of the Chang'e 3 spacecraft was expected to increase the content of lunar dust in the tenuous lunar exosphere, as well as introduce gases from engine firings during landing. Although there is no formal cooperation between NASA and the China National Space Administration, the landing provided an opportunity for NASA's Lunar Atmosphere and Dust Environment Explorer (LADEE) mission to examine possible changes to the baseline readings of the Moon's exosphere, and will allow it to study how dust and spent propellant gases settle around the Moon after a landing. For example, one of the lander's combustion byproducts is water vapor, and LADEE may be able to observe how lunar water is deposited in cold traps near the poles. NASA's Lunar Reconnaissance Orbiter (LRO) took a photograph of the landing site on 25 December 2013 in which the lander and the rover can be seen. LRO also attempted to photograph the lander and rover on 22 January 2014, and on 18 February 2014.

== Status ==
The rover was still intermittently transmitting as late as 6 September 2014. As of March 2015, the rover remained immobile and its instruments continued degrading, but was still able to communicate with Earth radio stations. While amateur observers were unable to detect transmissions from the lander, Chinese officials reported that the craft was still operating its UV Camera and Telescope as it entered its 14th lunar night on 14 January 2015.

The Yutu rover ceased to transmit data in March 2015. Status checks of the lander and its Lunar-based Ultraviolet Telescope (LUT) in 2018, 2020, and 2025, indicate that the spacecraft is still operational, roughly twelve years after landing on the Moon. The power source for the lander, which consists of a radioisotope heater unit (RHU) and solar panels, could last for 30 years.

== Chang'e 3 landing site named 'Guang Han Gong' ==
The landing site of China's first Moon lander Chang'e 3 has been named "Guang Han Gong（广寒宫） (Guang: widely, extensively; Han: cold, freezing；Gong: Palace) " or "Moon Palace" by the International Astronomical Union (IAU), China's State Administration of Science, Technology and Industry for National Defense (SASTIND). Three nearby impact craters were given the names Zi Wei, Tian Shi and Tai Wei, three constellations in traditional Chinese astrology.

== See also ==
- China National Space Administration (CNSA)
- Chinese space program
  - Chinese Lunar Exploration Program
  - Planetary Exploration of China
- Chang'e 4
- Chang'e 5
- Chang'e 6
- Changesite-(Y)
- List of missions to the Moon
- List of artificial objects on the Moon
