= Yutu (rover) =

Chinese lunar rover

Yutu 玉兔
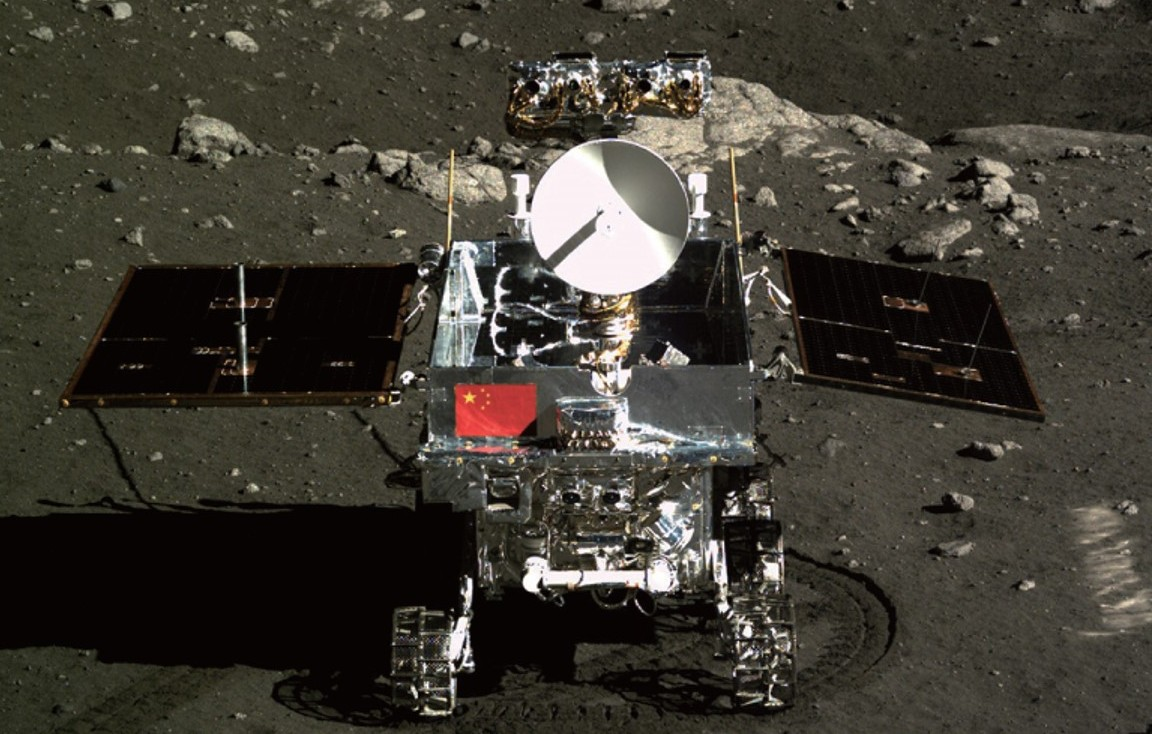
- Yutu rover on lunar surface
- Mission type: Lunar rover
- Operator: CNSA
- COSPAR ID: 2013-070C
- Mission duration: 3 months (planned); Actual: 973 days Immobile since 25 January 2014, 42 days after landing.

Spacecraft properties
- Manufacturer: SASEI and BISSE
- Landing mass: 140 kg (310 lb)
- Dimensions: 1.5 m (4.9 ft)
- Power: • Solar panels for electricity • Radioisotope heater units for heating

Start of mission
- Launch date: 1 December 2013, 17:30 UTC
- Rocket: Long March 3B Y-23
- Launch site: Xichang LC-2
- Deployed from: Chang'e 3

End of mission
- Declared: 3 August 2016
- Last contact: Mid-2016

Lunar rover
- Landing date: 14 December 2013, 13:12 UTC
- Landing site: Mare Imbrium; 44.12°N 19.51°W
- Distance driven: 114.8 m (377 ft)

Yutu (Chinese: 玉兔; pinyin: Yùtù; lit. 'Jade Rabbit') was a robotic lunar rover that formed part of the Chinese Chang'e 3 mission to the Moon. It was launched at 17:30 UTC on 1 December 2013, and reached the Moon's surface on 14 December 2013. The mission marks the first soft landing on the Moon since 1976 and the first rover to operate there since the Soviet Lunokhod 2 ceased operations on 11 May 1973.

The rover encountered operational difficulties toward the end of the second lunar day after surviving and recovering successfully from the first 14-day lunar night. It was unable to move after the end of the second lunar night, though it continued to gather useful information for some months afterward. In October 2015, Yutu set the record for the longest operational period for a rover on the Moon. On 31 July 2016, Yutu ceased to operate after a total of 31 months, well beyond its original expected lifespan of three months.

In total, while working on the Moon, the rover was able to travel a distance of 114 meters.

In 2018 the follow-on to the Yutu rover, the Yutu-2 rover, launched as part of the Chang'e 4 mission.

== History ==
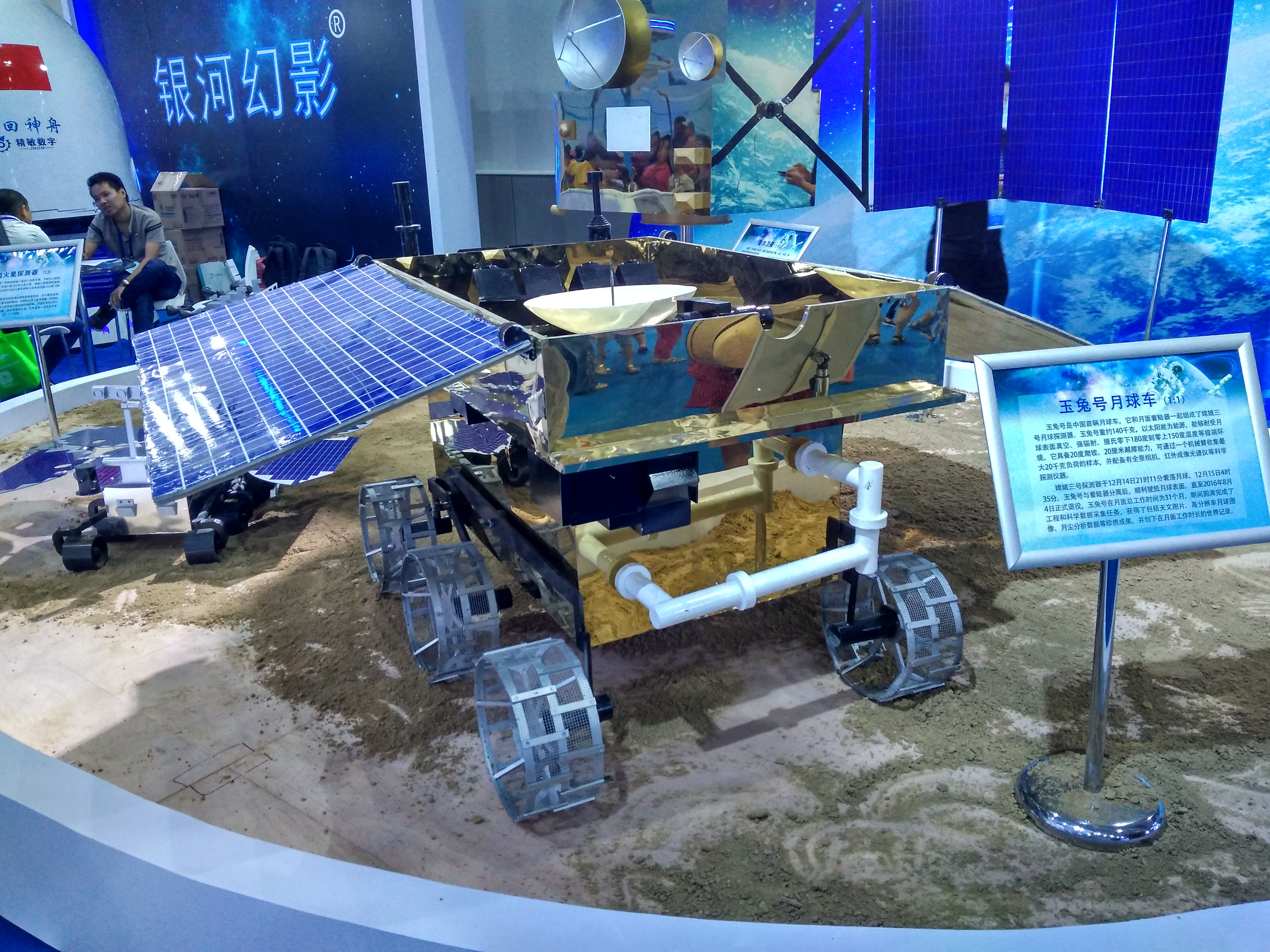
Full scale mock-up of Yutu rover

The Yutu lunar rover was developed by Shanghai Aerospace System Engineering Institute (SASEI) and Beijing Institute of Spacecraft System Engineering (BISSE). The development of the six-wheeled rover began in 2002 and was completed in May 2010. The rover deployed from the lander and explored the lunar surface independently. The rover's name was selected in an online poll, and is a reference to the pet rabbit of Chang'e, the goddess of the Moon in Chinese mythology.

== Objectives ==
The official mission objective was to achieve China's first soft-landing and roving exploration on the Moon, as well as to demonstrate and develop key technologies for future missions.

The scientific objectives of Chang'e-3 mainly included lunar surface topography and geological survey, lunar surface material composition and resource survey, Sun-Earth-Moon space environment detection, and lunar-based astronomical observation. Chang'e 3 performed the first direct radar measurement of the structure and depth of the lunar soil down to a depth of 30 m (98 ft), and investigated the lunar crust structure down to several hundred meters deep.

The Chinese Lunar Exploration Program was divided into three main operational phases:

- Orbiting (Chang'e 1 and Chang'e 2)
- Landing (Chang'e 3 and Chang'e 4)
- Sample return (Chang'e 5)

== Specifications ==
Unlike NASA and ESA, the China National Space Administration reveals little about its missions to the public, so detailed information about Chang'e 3 is limited. Aspects of Yutu's design and several of its experiments may have been based on NASA's Mars Exploration Rovers. Its wheel design is believed to have been considerably influenced by what was used on the Russian Lunokhod 1 rover.

The Yutu rover has a mass of 140 kg (310 lb), with a payload capacity of 20 kg (44 lb). It is smaller than the Mars Exploration Rovers, Spirit and Opportunity, and carries similar instruments: panoramic cameras, an infrared spectrometer and an alpha particle X-ray spectrometer (APXS). Yutu is also equipped with a robotic arm to position its APXS near a target sample. In addition, the rover could transmit live video, and has automatic sensors to prevent it from colliding with other objects.

Yutu was designed to explore an area of 3 square kilometres (1.2 sq mi) during its three-month mission, with a maximum travelling distance of 10 km (6.2 mi). Energy was provided by two solar panels, allowing the rover to operate through lunar days. During the 14-day lunar nights, the rover went into sleep mode, during which heating was provided by radioisotope heater units (RHU) using plutonium-238 and two-phase fluid loops.

== Scientific payload ==
The Yutu rover carried a ground-penetrating radar and spectrometers to inspect the composition of the soil and the structure of the lunar crust beneath it.

=== Ground-penetrating radar (GPR) ===
The rover carried a ground-penetrating radar (GPR) on its underside, allowing for the first direct measurement of the structure and depth of the lunar soil down to a depth of 30 m (98 ft), and investigation of the lunar crust structure down to several hundred metres deep.

=== Spectrometers ===
The rover carried an alpha particle X-ray spectrometer (APXS) and an infrared spectrometer, intended to analyze the chemical element composition of lunar samples. The APXS was the only payload on the robotic arm.

=== Stereo cameras ===
There were two panoramic cameras and two navigation cameras on the rover's mast, which stands ~1.5 m (4.9 ft) above the lunar surface, as well as two hazard avoidance cameras installed on the lower front portion of the rover. Each camera pair was used to capture stereoscopic images, or for range imaging by triangulation.

== Landing site ==
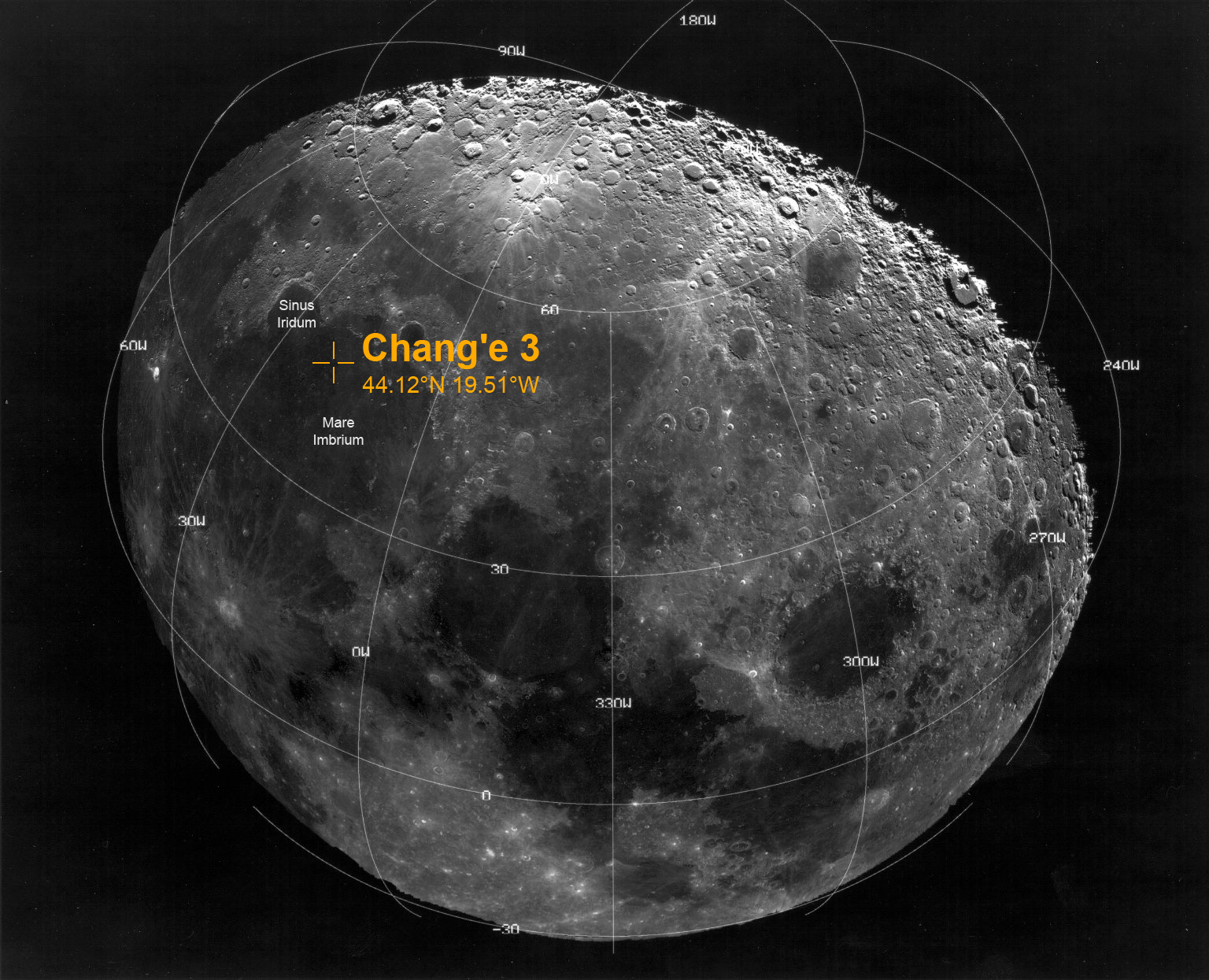
The planned landing site was Sinus Iridum, a lava-filled crater 249 km (155 mi) in diameter. The actual landing took place on Mare Imbrium.

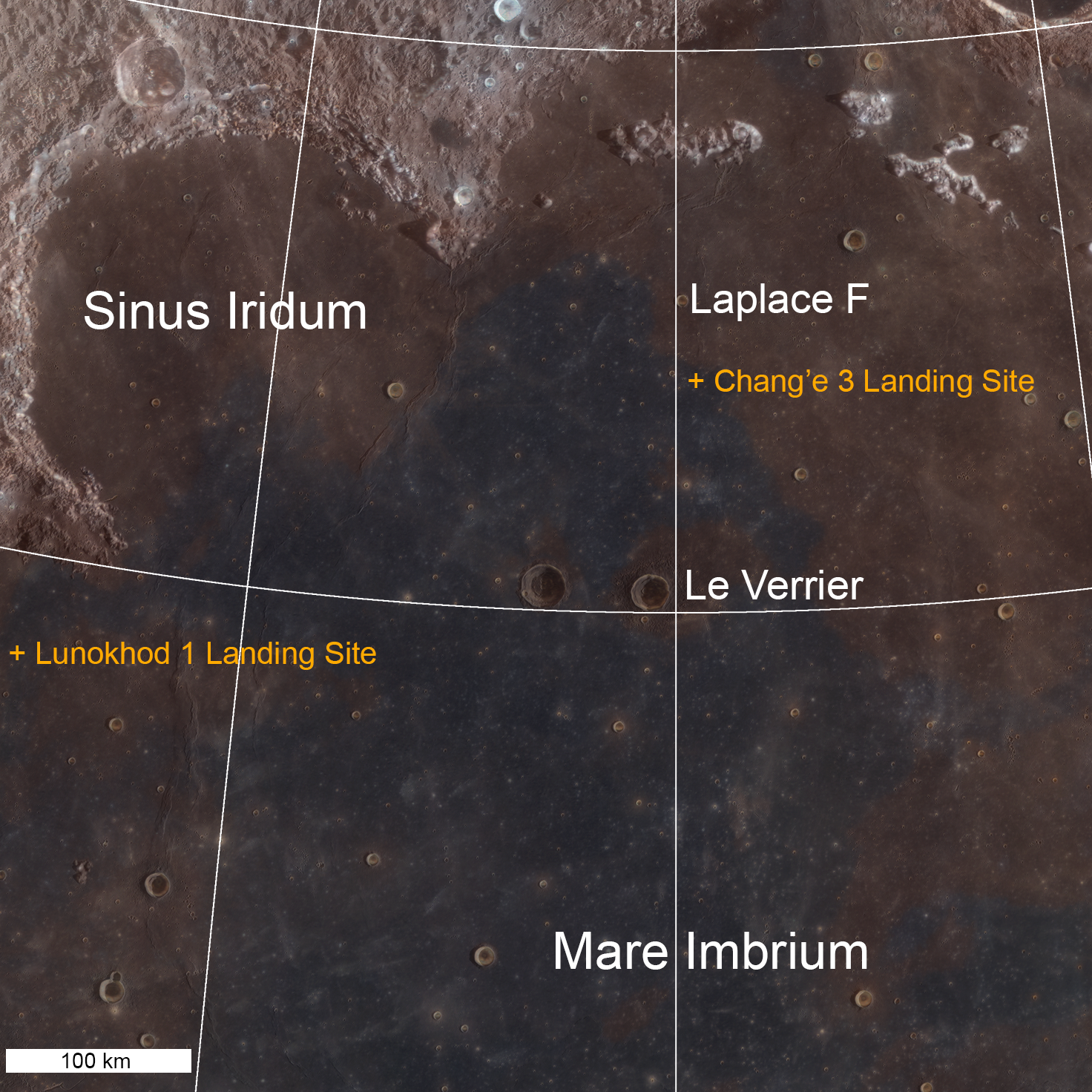
LRO image of the landing site, which is close to the transition between light and dark maria

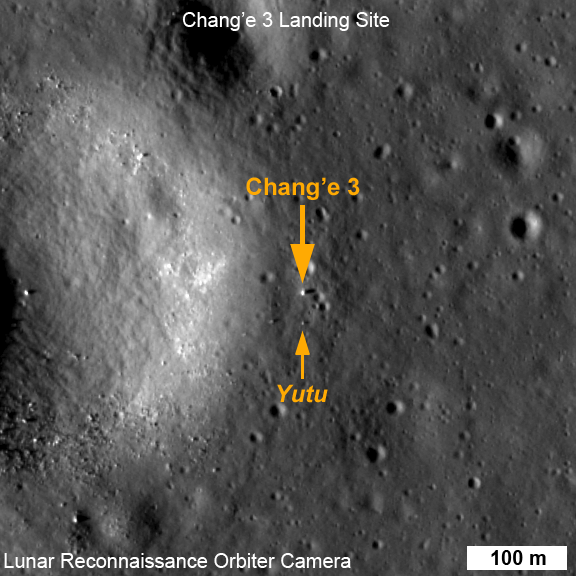
LRO close-up image taken on 25 December 2013. The lander (large arrow) and rover (small arrow) can be seen.

Chang'e 3 landed on 14 December 2013 and deployed the Yutu rover 7 hours 24 minutes later.

The planned landing site was announced to be Sinus Iridum. However, the lander descended on Mare Imbrium, about 40 km (25 mi) south of the 6 km (3.7 mi) diameter crater Laplace F, at 44.1214°N, 19.5116°W (2640 m elevation)

== Operations ==
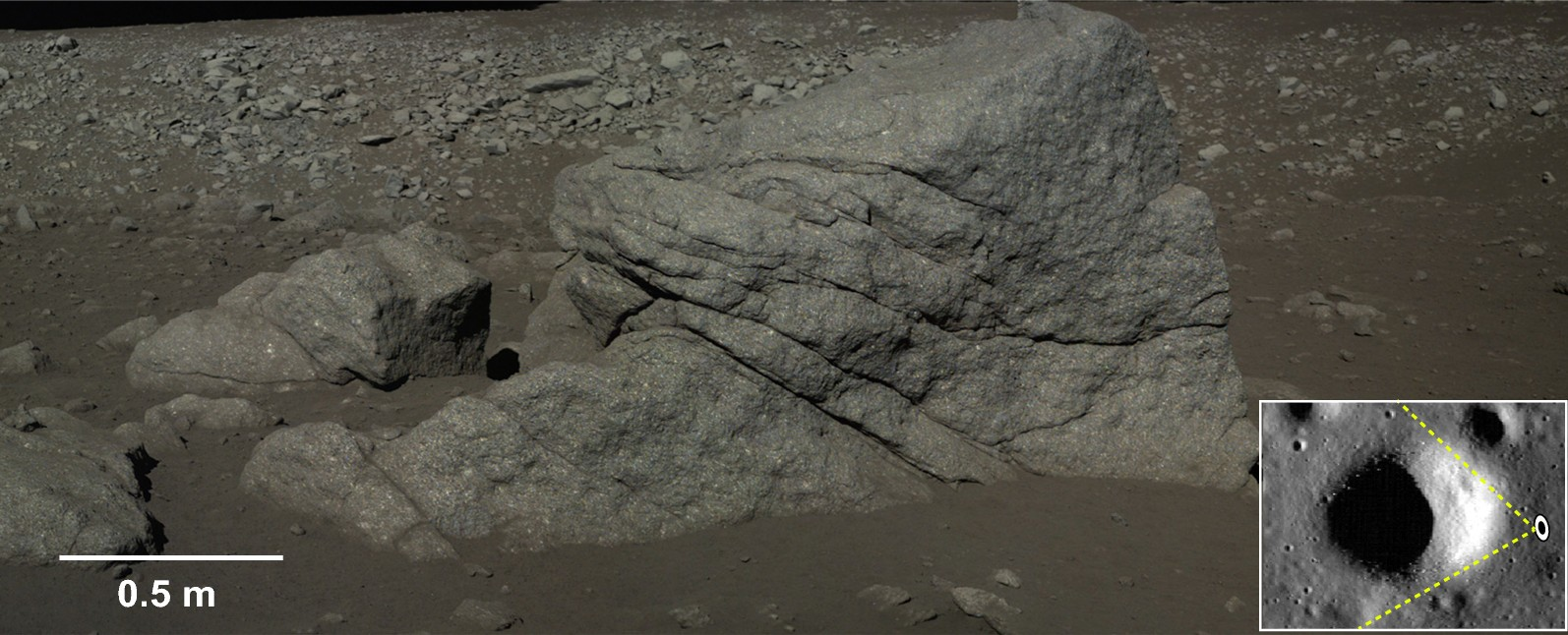
Boulders near Ziwei crater photographed by the Yutu rover

=== First lunar day ===
The rover was successfully deployed from the lander and made contact with the lunar surface on 20:35 UTC, 14 December 2013. On 17 December 2013, it was announced that all of the scientific instruments except the spectrometers were successfully activated, with both the lander and rover "functioning as hoped, despite the unexpectedly rigorous conditions of the lunar environment". From 16 December 2013 to 20 December 2013, the rover remained immobile as its systems were partially powered down. Direct solar radiation raised the temperature on the exposed side of the rover to over 100 °C, while the shaded side simultaneously fell below 0 °C.

By 22 December 2013, Yutu had completed its initial science mission: to photograph the lander from several different angles, following a roughly semi-circular route from north to south of the lander, while also being photographed and filmed at the same time by the lander. A number of these images have been released, including a stereoscopic view of the lander and videos of the rover in motion. The lander and rover then commenced their respective science missions.

In addition to successfully deploying its robotic arm, Yutu completed diagnostic checks on 23 December 2013 to ensure that it was prepared for the upcoming lunar night, and moved about 40 metres south of the lander. The lander also commenced diagnostics the following day. The lander first entered a low-power state at around 11:00 am, UTC+8 on 25 December 2013, later executed by the rover at 5:23 am on 26 December 2013 to conserve power as no sunlight will be received by the lander and rover's solar panels for 14 consecutive days. Both had to withstand the extreme cold of the two-week-long lunar nights.

=== Second lunar day ===
On 11 January 2014, following the lunar night, the rover exited sleep mode and completed its first lunar soil inspection on 16 January 2014. On 25 January 2014, near the end of the second lunar day, China's state media announced that the rover had undergone a "mechanical control abnormality", as caused by the "complicated lunar surface environment". The Planetary Society reported that the rover was not responding to commands from Earth correctly, rendering it unable to "prepare for the oncoming night properly." It later became evident that the rover suffered a control circuit malfunction in its driving unit, which prevented it from entering normal dormancy and folding its mast and solar panels.

=== Third lunar day ===
On 12 February 2014, Command Control listened for all transmissions from Yutu after enduring its second lunar night. Failure of communication attempts caused it to be declared permanently inoperative. On 13 February, it unexpectedly re-established communication with Command Control. China's lunar program spokesman Pei Zhaoyu declared that although Yutu was able to communicate, "it still suffers a mechanical control abnormality," rendering it immobile.

The rover entered its third hibernation period on 22 February 2014 and continued to remain immobile, while serious technical difficulties persisted, further hampering science operations. Chinese space scientists eventually ascertained that the control circuit had failed, and this prevented Yutu from entering normal dormancy as planned, but stated that the GPR, panoramic and infrared imaging equipment were still functioning normally.

=== 14th lunar day ===
While amateur observers were unable to detect transmissions from the lander, Chinese officials reported that the craft was still operating its UV Camera and Telescope as it entered its 14th lunar night on 14 January 2015. On 18 April 2014, Wang Jianyu, deputy secretary general of the Chinese Society of Space Research stated that the failure was not mechanical, but electrical, and they were looking to bypass it. He also explained, "The temperature on the Moon is considerably lower than our previous estimation", adding that "certain components may be suffering from 'frostbite'".

Yutu's solar panel alignment motors failed to respond, causing its solar panels to remain fully deployed as opposed to its planned insulating position to conserve heat as it entered low-power mode, exposing its internal electronics to the Moon's harsh outer environment. As Yutu progressed through consequent lunar nights, it lost certain capabilities, but successfully exceeded its expected three-month operating life. Yutu's scientific instruments may be functioning, but subsequent science data were very limited as the NIR spectrometer and the ground-penetrating radar were limited to the same observation as it was immobile. Mission Control planned to extend Yutu's mission until it ceased to communicate, as it would provide valuable data on its components' endurance to the lunar environment.

The rover remained operational in December 2015 and continued to transmit data every lunar day.

By the end of October 2015, Yutu had set the record for the longest operational period of a rover on the Moon, though most of its time was spent immobile.

=== End of mission ===
On 3 August 2016, it was reported that the rover had ceased to communicate with Chang'e 3 despite attempts to reestablish transmissions, effectively ending the mission.

== Discoveries ==
The rover's ground penetrating radar found evidence for a minimum of nine distinct rock layers, indicating that the area had surprisingly complex geological processes and is compositionally distinct from the Apollo and Luna landing sites.

During 15 April 2014, the Chang'e 3 mission, including its Yutu rover, witnessed a total eclipse of the Sun by the Earth from the surface of the Moon.

== See also ==
- List of artificial objects on the Moon
- List of missions to the Moon
