= World Space Award =

Space award

The World Space Award (also known as IAF World Space Award) is presented by International Astronautical Federation to an eminent individual or team at the IAC Congress, after a nomination process, that has made an exceptional impact to the progress of the world space activities by their outstanding contributions in the fields of space science, technology, medicine, law, or management over the period of time. it is often described as the "world's highest aerospace award", first awarded in 2013.

== Past recipients ==
Year	Recipients	Agency (Nation)	Note
2013	Edward C. Stone	NASA (USA)	
2016	Yuri Koptev	Roscosmos (Russia)	
2017	Charles Bolden	NASA (USA)	
2019	Apollo 11 Crew List: Neil A. Armstrong Michael Collins Edwin E. Aldrin Jr.	NASA (USA)	
2020	Chang'e 4 Mission Leaders List: Wu Weiren Yu Dengyun Sun Zezhou	CNSA (China)	
2021	Hayabusa2 Team	JAXA (Japan)	
2022	Tianwen-1 Spacecraft Development Team	CNSA (China)	
2023	James Webb Space Telescope Team	NASA (USA); ESA (EU); CSA (Canada)	
2023	Elon Musk	SpaceX (USA)	
2024	Chandrayaan-3 Team	ISRO (India)	
2025	Jeff Bezos	Blue Origin (USA)	
2025	Chang'e 6 Team	CNSA (China)	
