= Chang'e 2 =

Chinese Moon orbiter

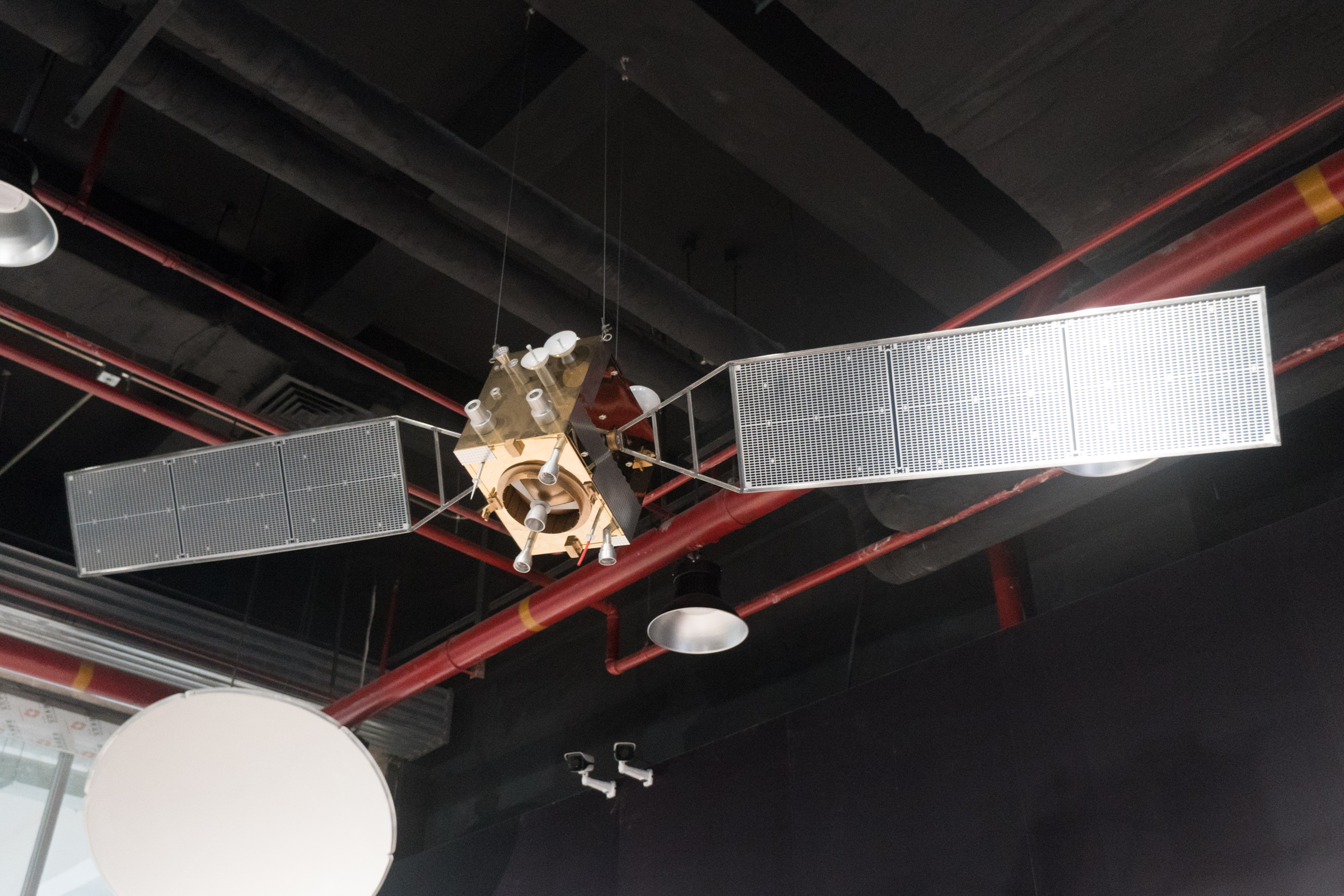
- Chang'e 2 mockup displayed at Beijing Air and Space Museum
- Mission type: Lunar orbiter Asteroid flyby Technology demonstration
- Operator: CNSA
- COSPAR ID: 2010-050A
- SATCAT no.: 37174
- Mission duration: Planned: 6 months Final: ~4 years

Spacecraft properties
- Bus: DFH-3
- Launch mass: 2,480 kg

Start of mission
- Launch date: 1 October 2010, 10:59 UTC
- Rocket: Chang Zheng 3C
- Launch site: Xichang LC-2

End of mission
- Last contact: 2014

Orbital parameters
- Reference system: Heliocentric

Lunar orbiter
- Orbital insertion: 6 October 2010, 03:06 UTC
- Orbital departure: 8 June 2011

Flyby of 4179 Toutatis
- Closest approach: 13 December 2012, 08:30 UTC
- Distance: 3.2 kilometres (2.0 mi)

Instruments
- CCD-improved stereo camera Laser altimeter Gamma/X-ray spectrometers Microwave detector

Chang'e 2 ( /tʃæŋˈʌ/; simplified Chinese: 嫦娥二号; traditional Chinese: 嫦娥二號; pinyin: Cháng'é èr hào) is a Chinese uncrewed lunar probe that was launched on 1 October 2010. It was a follow-up to the Chang'e 1 lunar probe, which was launched in 2007. Chang'e 2 was part of the first phase of the Chinese Lunar Exploration Program, and conducted research from a 100-km-high lunar orbit in preparation for the December 2013 soft landing by the Chang'e 3 lander and rover. Chang'e 2 was similar in design to Chang'e 1, although it featured some technical improvements, including a more advanced onboard camera. Like its predecessor, the probe was named after Chang'e, an ancient Chinese moon goddess.

After completing its primary objective, the probe left lunar orbit for the Earth–Sun L_{2} Lagrangian point, to test the Chinese tracking and control network, making the China National Space Administration the third space agency after NASA and ESA to have visited this point. It entered orbit around L_{2} on 25 August 2011, and began transmitting data from its new position in September 2011. In April 2012, Chang'e 2 departed L_{2} to begin an extended mission to the asteroid 4179 Toutatis, which it successfully flew by in December 2012. This success made China's CNSA the fourth space agency to directly explore asteroids, after NASA, ESA and JAXA. As of 2014, Chang'e 2 has travelled over 100 million km from Earth, conducting a long-term mission to verify China's deep-space tracking and control systems. Contact with the spacecraft was lost in 2014 as its signal strength weakened due to distance. The probe is expected to return to Earth's vicinity sometime around 2027.

== Overview ==
The Chinese Lunar Exploration Program is designed to be conducted in four phases of incremental technological advancement: The first is simply reaching lunar orbit, a task completed by Chang'e 1 in 2007 and Chang'e 2 in 2010. The second is landing and roving on the Moon, as Chang'e 3 did in 2013 and Chang'e 4 did in 2019. The third is collecting lunar samples from the near-side and sending them to Earth, a task Chang'e 5 completed in 2020 and Chang'e 6 completed in 2024. The fourth phase consists of development of a robotic research station near the Moon's south pole. The program aims to facilitate a crewed lunar landing in the 2030s and possibly build an outpost near the south pole.

== Design ==
Chang'e 2 was the backup of the Chang'e 1 probe and it had been modified for its own mission. While Chang'e 1 operated in a 200-km orbit, Chang'e 2 flew at only 100 km, allowing for higher-resolution images and more precise science data. The probe also possessed a higher-resolution camera, being able to resolve features as small as 1 metre (3.3 ft) across from orbit. According to Qian Huang of the Shanghai Astronomical Observatory and Yong-Chun Zheng of the NAOC, the spacecraft also had a shorter Earth-to-Moon cruise time of 5 days, rather than 12. The probe's launch rocket had two more boosters to accomplish this more direct route to the Moon. Furthermore, its laser altimeter's footprint was smaller than Chang'e 1's, achieving 5-meter vertical accuracy in its estimate of the Moon's radius. It also pulsed more frequently – five times per second rather than just once per second, as Chang'e 1's altimeter did. Additionally, the probe's main camera had a spatial resolution of 10 metres (33 ft), rather than 120 metres (390 ft). The total cost of the Chang'e 2 mission was approximately CN¥900 million ($125 million).

Late in the mission, Chang'e 2's orbit was lowered to an elliptical one, with the same apolune (100 km) as Chang'e 1, but with a perilune of only 15 km. Tracking for the mission was performed with an X-band radio capability, which was not available for Chang'e 1. Zheng remarked that "the mission goals of Chang'e 2 were focused into the high resolution image for the future landing site of CE-3 lunar lander and rover. The success of Chang'e 2 provided an important technical basis for the successful implementation of China's future lunar exploration," and the Queqiao relay satellite was based on Chang'e 2 design.

== Mission summary ==
=== Launch ===
Chang'e 2 was launched on 1 October 2010 at 10:59:57 UTC aboard a Long March 3C rocket from Xichang Satellite Launch Center in Xichang, Sichuan. The launch of the probe coincided with China's National Day on 1 October, in a symbolic celebration of the country's 61st communist anniversary.

=== Lunar mission ===
The spacecraft entered an orbit with a perigee of 200 km and an apogee of 380,000 km, and separated from the carrier rocket as planned. It was the first time that a Chinese lunar probe directly entered an Earth-to-Moon transfer orbit without orbiting the Earth first. After the launch, Chang'e 2 arrived in its lunar orbit within 4 days and 16 hours. Later, the probe lowered its orbit to 100 km (62 mi), with a perilune of 15 km (9.3 mi). Chang'e 2 entered its 100 km working orbit on 9 October 2010 after three successful brakings. On 8 November 2010, the Chinese government announced the success of all of Chang'e 2's mission objectives, and published lunar surface images with a resolution of up to 1.3 metres (4.3 ft). In February 2012, the Chinese government released a complete lunar map constructed from Chang'e 2's data, claiming that it was the highest-resolution map of the entire Moon yet recorded. The full dataset, including the map with resolutions of 7, 20 and 50 m, and elevations model with resolutions of 20 and 50 m, is available for free download since April 2018.

=== L2 mission ===
On 8 June 2011, Chang'e 2 completed its extended mission, and left lunar orbit for the Earth–Sun L2 Lagrangian point, to test the Chinese tracking and control network. The probe reached L2 on 25 August 2011 at 23:27 Beijing time (14:27 UTC) after a 77-day cruise, becoming the first object ever to reach the L2 point directly from lunar orbit, and travelling further than any previous Chinese space probe. The probe beamed its first batch of data from L2 in September 2011. Though it was expected to remain at L2 until the end of 2012, it departed on an extended mission in April 2012.

=== 4179 Toutatis mission ===
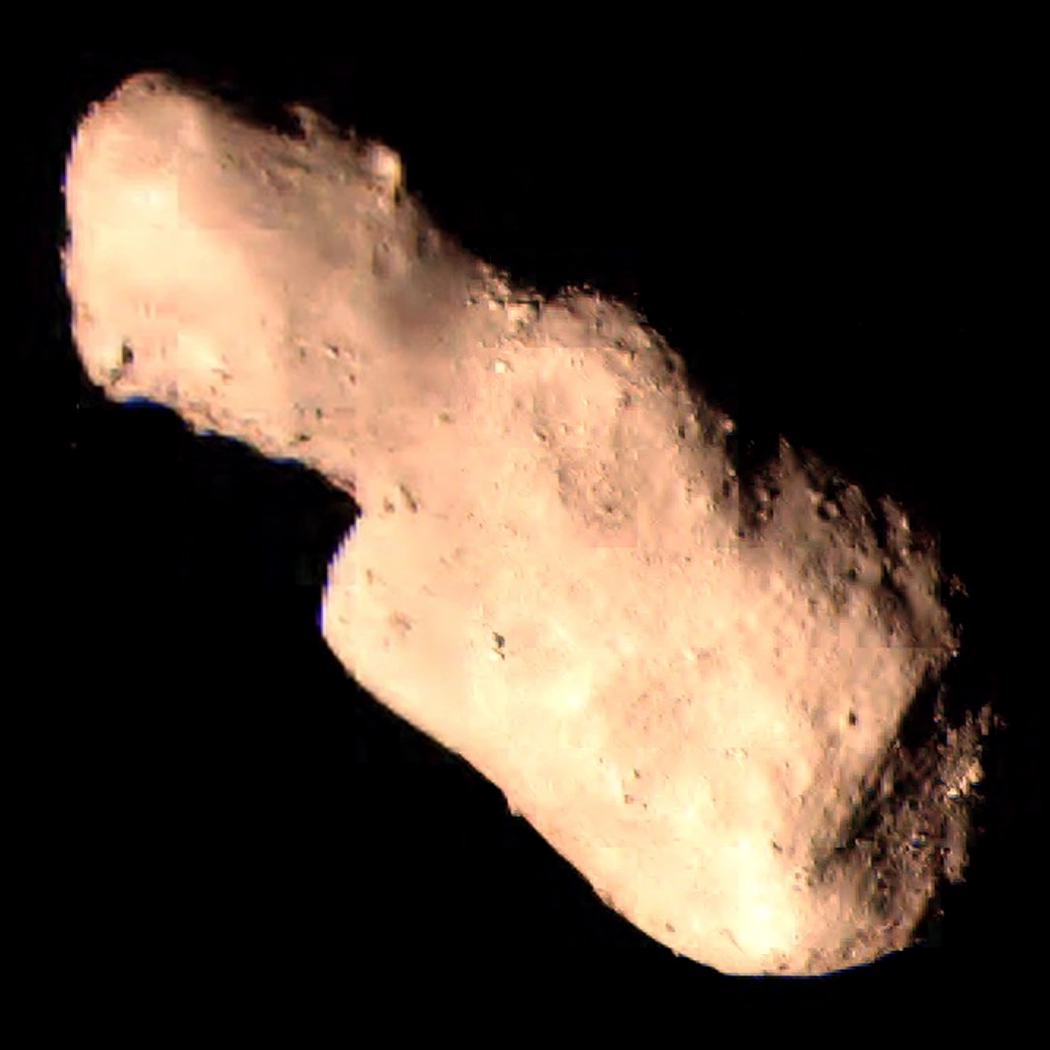
Toutatis imaged by Chang'e 2 during its flyby

According to Ouyang Ziyuan's report to the 16th Conference of the Chinese Academy of Sciences, Chang'e 2 departed from L2 on 15 April 2012, and began a mission to the asteroid 4179 Toutatis. The flyby was successfully achieved on 13 December 2012 at 16:30:09 Beijing Time (08:30:09 GMT). Close-up images of the asteroid, with a resolution of up to 10 metres (33 ft) per pixel, were later published online. The flyby was the first time an uncrewed spacecraft had imaged the asteroid so closely. Chang'e 2 came as close as 3.2 kilometres (2.0 mi) to Toutatis, and took pictures of the asteroid at a relative velocity of 10.73 kilometres (6.67 mi) per second. China thus became the fourth space agency to conduct a successful mission to an asteroid, after NASA, ESA and JAXA.

=== Deep-space journey ===
As of 2016, Chang'e 2 has reached a distance of over 200 million km from Earth; potentially, it has enough fuel remaining to continue functioning up to a distance of 300 million km, according to the China Aerospace Corporation. Contact with the probe was lost in 2014, however, due to weakening signal strength. It is estimated that Chang'e 2 will return to the Earth's vicinity around 2027.

== See also ==
- China National Space Administration (CNSA)
- Chinese space program
  - Planetary Exploration of China
- Chinese Lunar Exploration Program
  - Chang'e 1
  - Chang'e 3 / Yutu rover
  - Chang'e 4 / Yutu-2
  - Chang'e 5-T1
  - Chang'e 5
  - Chang'e 6
- List of asteroids visited by spacecraft
- Robotic exploration of the Moon
