= Chang'e 6 =

Chinese lunar sample-return mission

- The Chang'e 6 lander (with the ascender on top) on the far side of the Moon. The photo was taken from Jinchan, a camera-equipped mini-rover that was released from the lander.
- Mission type: Surface sample return
- Operator: CNSA
- COSPAR ID: 2024-083A
- SATCAT no.: 59627
- Mission duration: 52 days, 20 hours and 39 minutes

Spacecraft properties
- Manufacturer: CAST
- Launch mass: 8,350 kg (18,410 lb)

Start of mission
- Launch date: 3 May 2024; 09:27:29 UTC
- Rocket: Long March 5
- Launch site: Wenchang

End of mission
- Landing date: 25 June 2024; 06:07 UTC; Return capsule
- Landing site: Inner Mongolia, China

Lunar orbiter
- Orbital insertion: 8 May 2024; 02:12 UTC
- Orbital departure: 20 June 2024; ~15:00 UTC

Orbital parameters
- Periapsis altitude: 220 km (140 mi)
- Inclination: 137°

Lunar lander
- Landing date: 1 June 2024; 22:23:16 UTC
- Return launch: 3 June 2024; 23:38:10 UTC
- Landing site: Southern mare of Apollo Basin; 41.6385°S 153.9852°W
- Sample mass: 1,935.3 g (68.27 oz)

Jinchan Lunar rover
- Landing date: 1 June 2024; 22:23:16 UTC
- Landing site: Southern mare of Apollo Basin

Docking with Sample Ascender
- Docking date: 6 June 2024; 06:48 UTC
- Undocking date: 6 June 2024

Chang'e 6 (Chinese: 嫦娥六号; pinyin: Cháng'é liùhào) was the sixth robotic lunar exploration mission by the China National Space Administration (CNSA) and the second CNSA lunar sample-return mission. Like its predecessors in the Chinese Lunar Exploration Program, the spacecraft is named after the Chinese moon goddess Chang'e. It was the first lunar mission to retrieve samples from the far side of the Moon; all previous samples were collected from the near side.

The mission began on 3 May 2024 when the spacecraft was launched from Wenchang Space Launch Site on Hainan Island. Its lander and rover touched down on the lunar far side on 1 June 2024. The lander's robotic scoop and drill took samples with a total mass of 1935.3 grams from the lunar surface; the ascender module then carried these into lunar orbit on 3 June 2024. The ascender docked with the orbiter module in lunar orbit on 6 June 2024 and transferred the samples to an atmospheric re-entry module which then returned to Earth. The mission's lander and rover also conducted scientific experiments on the lunar surface.

The overall mission lasted about 53 days, ending on 25 June 2024 with the return capsule re-entering the atmosphere with the samples, landing by parachute in Inner Mongolia. In September 2025, the mission's team was awarded the World Space Award by the International Astronautical Federation.

== Overview ==
The Chinese Lunar Exploration Program is designed to be conducted in four phases of incremental technological advancement:

- The goal of the first phase was to reach lunar orbit. This was completed by Chang'e 1 in 2007 and by Chang'e 2 in 2010.
- The second phase sought to land and rove on the Moon, a feat that was accomplished by Chang'e 3 in 2013 and by Chang'e 4 in 2019.
- The third phase involves the collection of lunar samples and sending them to Earth, first completed by Chang'e 5 in 2020 and, for the first time from the far side by Chang'e 6 in 2024.
- The fourth phase consists of the development of a robotic research station near the Moon's south pole. The program aims to facilitate crewed lunar landings in the 2030s and possibly build a crewed outpost near the lunar south pole.

The preceding Chang'e 5 mission returned 1.731 kilograms (3.82 lb) of material from the northern hemisphere of the lunar near side.

The Chang'e 6 mission landed on the southern hemisphere of the lunar far side to gather more material. Specifically, the landing segment of the Chang'e 6 mission touched down in a relatively flat area lying in the southern portion of the Apollo crater, which itself lies within the larger South Pole-Aitken (SPA) impact basin on the lunar far side. Scientists hope that the samples collected from the landing area may include lunar mantle material ejected by the original impact that created the SPA basin, material which can shed light on the differences that exist between the lunar near-side and far-side, and on the origin of the Moon and the Solar System.

The Chang'e 6 lander landed at 22:23 UTC on 1 June 2024 in the southern mare of Apollo Basin (lunar coordinates: 41.6385°S 153.9852°W). After the completion of sample collection and the placement of the sample on the ascender by the probe's robotic drill and robotic arm, the ascender took off from atop the lander portion of the probe at 23:38 UTC on 3 June 2024. The ascender docked with the Chang'e 6 service module (the orbiter) in lunar orbit at 06:48 UTC on 6 June 2024 and subsequently completed the transfer of the sample container to the Earth return module at 07:24 UTC on the same day. On 25 June 2024, the return capsule landed in Inner Mongolia.

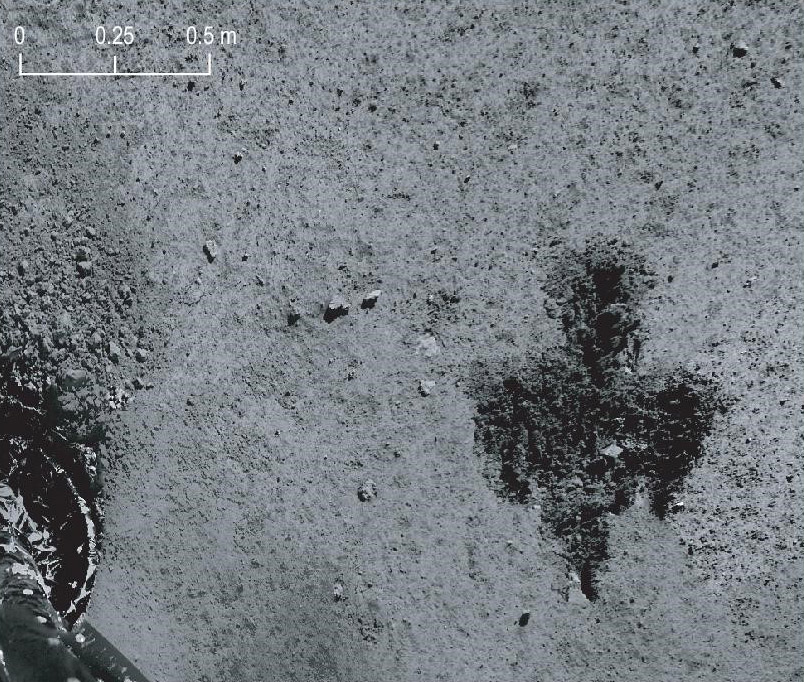
Chang'e 6 lunar surface sampling area - the hole left by the sampling

The mission's lander collected 1,935.3 grams (68.27 oz) of lunar far-side material including surface soil and rocks (using a scoop) and subsurface samples (using a drill). With the return capsule's re-entry back to Earth, China became the first nation to bring back samples from the far side of the Moon.

The hole left by the sampling was in the shape of the character zhong (中) which is the initial character of China's name Zhōngguó 中国. This symbolism went viral on Weibo.

== Mission architecture ==
Chang'e 6 was built as a copy of and backup to Chang'e 5. The mission is reported to consist of four modules:

- Lander: landed on the lunar surface after separating from the Orbiter, equipped with a drill and a scooping device. The Ascender was on the top of the Lander. It collected about 2 kg (4.4 lb) of samples from 2 metres (6.6 ft) below the surface and placed them in the attached ascent vehicle to be launched into lunar orbit.
- Ascender: The ascent vehicle then made a fully autonomous and robotic Lunar orbit rendezvous and docking with Orbiter where the samples were robotically transferred into a sample-return capsule for their delivery to Earth.
- Orbiter: after the samples were transported from the Ascender to the Orbiter, the Orbiter left lunar orbit and spent ~4.5 days flying back to Earth orbit and released the Returner (reentry capsule) just before arrival.
- Returner: The Returner will perform a skip reentry to bounce off the atmosphere once before formal reentering.

The estimated launch mass is 8,200 kg (18,100 lb)—the lander is projected to be 3,200 kg (7,100 lb) and the ascent vehicle is about 700 kg (1,500 lb).

== Science payloads ==
In October 2018, CNSA announced that it would call for international partners to propose an additional payload up to 10 kg (22 lb) to be included in this mission. In November 2022, it was announced that the mission would carry payloads from four international partners:

=== Lander ===
- A French instrument called DORN (Detection of Outgassing Radon) to study the transport of lunar dust and other volatiles between the lunar regolith and the lunar exosphere, including the water cycle.
- The Italian instrument INRRI (INstrument for landing-Roving laser Retroreflector Investigations) consists of a retroreflector that precisely measures distances from the lander to orbit, similar to those used in the Schiaparelli and InSight missions.
- The Swedish NILS (Negative Ions on Lunar Surface), an instrument to detect and measure negative ions reflected by the lunar surface.

=== Orbiter ===
- The Pakistani ICUBE-Q CubeSat orbiter developed by the Institute of Space Technology in collaboration with Shanghai Jiao Tong University, which carries two optical cameras to image the lunar surface and obtain lunar magnetic field data.

=== Jinchan mini-rover ===
Chang'e 6 carried a ~5kg (~11lb) mini-rover named "Jinchan" (Chinese: 金蟾), or "Golden Toad," due to its gold-sheeted insulating exterior. It is described as an "autonomous intelligent mini-robot" by its developer, CASC. Outfitted with its own micro solar panels, the rover was designed to support research into the composition of the lunar surface, the presence of water ice in the lunar soil via an imaging infrared spectrometer. Additionally, Jinchan was tasked to image the Chang'e 6 lander on the lunar surface and was equipped cameras on both sides for redundancy purposes. Following the sample collection process, "the mini rover autonomously detached from the lander, moved to a suitable position, selected an ideal angle for the photograph and then captured the image."

== Mission stages ==
=== Launch ===
Before/after animation showing Chang'e 6 lander as photographed by the NASA's Lunar Reconnaissance Orbiter.

The probe was launched by a Long March 5 rocket at 09:27 UTC, on 3 May 2024, from Wenchang Satellite Launch Center on Hainan Island.

=== Earth–Moon transfer ===
After launch, Chang'e 6 entered a 12-hour orbit around the Moon at 02:12 UTC, on 8 May 2024.

The lander/ascender/rover separated from the orbiter/returner on 30 May 2024, in preparation for landing.

=== Landing ===
At 22:06 UTC, on 1 June 2024, the Chang'e 6 lander/ascender, with the support of the Queqiao-2 relay satellite, descended from its 200 kilometer (124 miles) orbit altitude. It used its autonomous obstacle avoidance system, visible light camera, and laser 3D scanner to detect and avoid lunar obstacles and uneven terrain. At 22:23 UTC, it landed in the preselected area of the South Pole–Aitken basin on the far side of the Moon. The engine was cut for the final approach and a cushioning system was used for the freefall touchdown.

=== Return ===
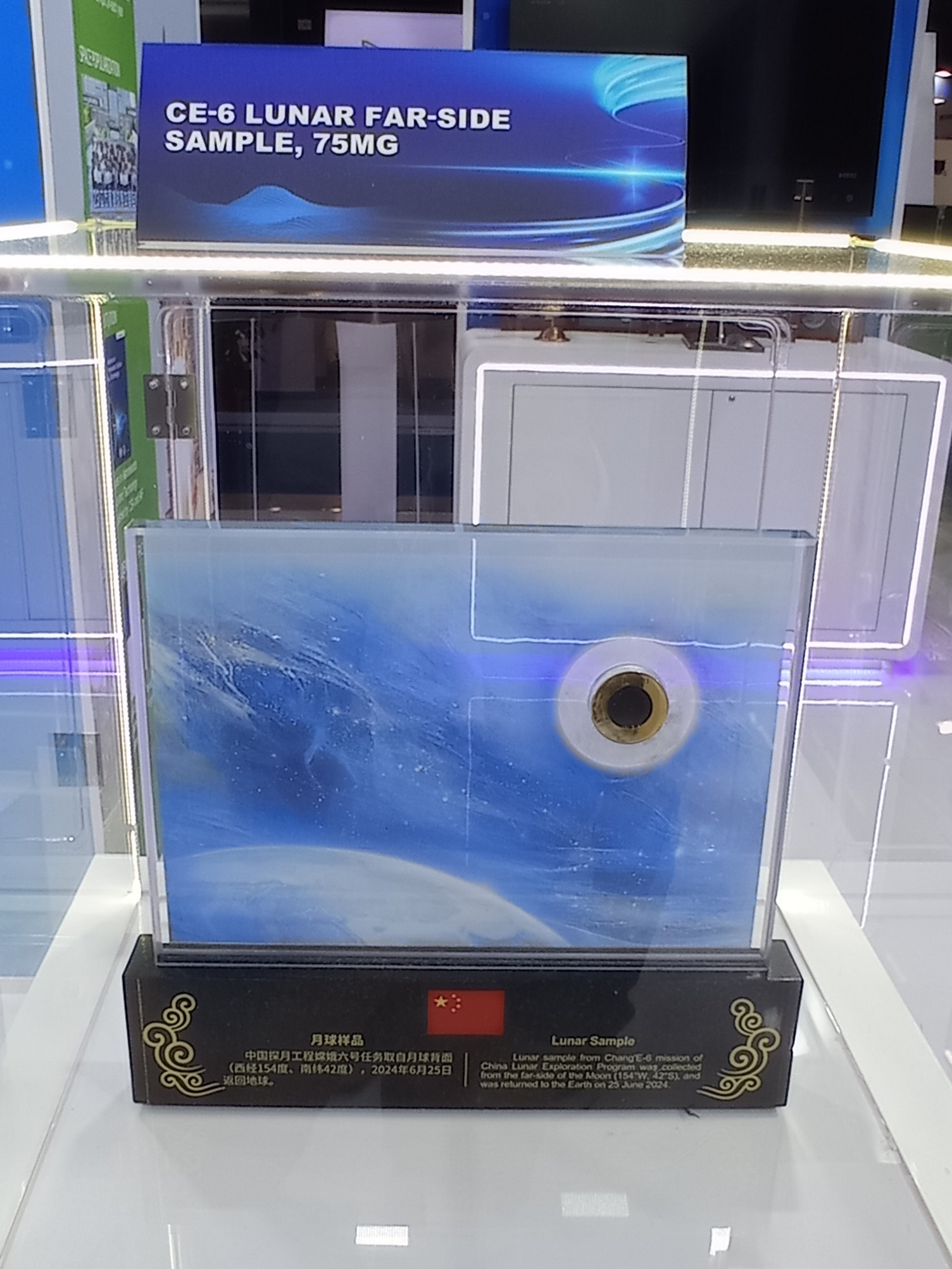
75mg lunar far-side sample collected by Chang'e 6, displayed at 75th IAC.

At 23:38 UTC on 3 June 2024, the Chang'e 6 ascender (carrying the samples) took off from the far side of the Moon and entered the predetermined circumlunar orbit. This was the world's first sampling and takeoff on the far side of the Moon.

At 06:48 UTC on 6 June, 2024, the Chang'e 6 ascender rendezvoused and docked with the orbiter/returner in lunar orbit. At 07:24 UTC, the lunar sample container was safely transferred to the returner.

On 21 June 2024, the service module of Chang'e 6 likely fired its engines to return to Earth from lunar orbit. At that time, CNSA did not provide updates on the mission, but some amateur optical and radio observers reported a probable engine burning.

The re-entry to Earth happened on 25 June 2024. An atmospheric re-entry module of about 300 kilograms separated from the service module which had flown back from the Moon. This then decelerated by skipping off the atmosphere over the Atlantic before its final descent. This capsule containing about 2 kilograms of samples landed by parachute at 06:07 UTC in the predesignated landing area of Siziwang Banner in Inner Mongolia. Search teams waiting for the capsule reached it within minutes using helicopters. The service module likely fired its engine for an Earth-impact avoidance burn.

The samples will be studied by Chinese scientists in collaboration with international experts. In the previous case of Chang'e 5 in 2020, direct access to samples by international partners started about three years after their return.

=== Extended mission ===
After dropping off the return samples for Earth, the Chang'e 6 (CE-6) orbiter was successfully captured by the Sun-Earth L2 Lagrange point on 9 September 2024.

== See also ==
- China National Space Administration – National space agency of the People's Republic of China (CNSA)
- Chinese space program
  - Chinese Lunar Exploration Program – Lunar research program (2004–present)
  - Planetary Exploration of China – Chinese Solar System exploration program
- List of missions to the Moon
- Lunar resources – In situ resources on the Moon
- Lunar water – Presence of water on the Moon
- Chang'e 7 – Planned Chinese lunar exploration mission
- Changesite-(Y) – Mineral in basalt particles on the Moon
- MoonRise – Proposed NASA mission to the Moon
- Sample-return mission – Spacecraft mission
