= Tao Jiali =

- Born: 1986 (age 39–40); Chengdu, Sichuan Province, China
- Occupation: Pilot
- Space career

CNSA Astronaut
- Rank: Captain, People's Liberation Army Air Force
- Selection: Candidate 2009 Female Group

Air Force Flag of the People's Republic of China

Tao Jiali (Chinese: 陶佳莉; born 1986) is a Chinese fighter pilot in the People's Liberation Army Air Force.

She was one of 35 high school students selected to join the People's Liberation Army Air Force as cadet pilots in July 2005. After four years of training at Aviation University and flight school, she became one of the 16 young women who graduated as fighter pilots.
