= Changesite-(Y) =

Mineral in basalt particles on the Moon

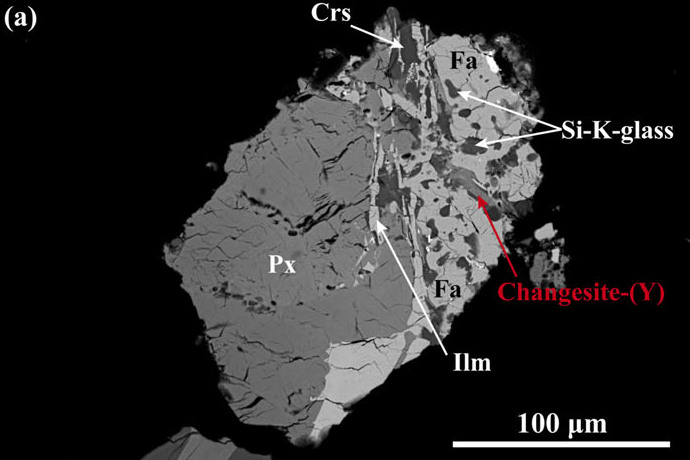
- Changesite-(Y), from Chang'e 5 landing site, Oceanus Procellarum, The Moon

General
- Category: phosphates
- Formula: (Ca_{8}Y)□Fe^{2+}(PO_{4})_{7}
- Crystal system: trigonal

Identification

Changesite-(Y), with the chemical formula (Ca_{8}Y)□Fe^{2+}(PO_{4})_{7}, is a mineral found forming colorless transparent columnar crystals in basalt particles on the Moon. Changesite-(Y) is a member of the merrillite group of phosphate minerals.

== History ==
Changesite-(Y) was first identified by researchers at the Beijing Research Institute of Uranium Geology. They discovered a single crystal of Changesite–(Y) using X-ray diffraction while examining particles collected from the Chinese Lunar Exploration Program's fifth lunar exploration mission, Chang'e 5, which is also China's first sample-return mission to the Moon. The mineral is named after Chang'e, the Moon goddess in Chinese mythology. China National Space Administration and China Atomic Energy Authority jointly announced the discovery of Changesite-(Y) in Beijing on September 9, 2022, and its recognition has been approved by the International Mineralogical Association and its Commission on New Minerals, Nomenclature and Classification. The discovery also makes China the third country to discover a new lunar mineral after the United States and former Soviet Union.

=== Application ===
Changesite-(Y) contains the isotope helium-3 (^{3}He), which is useful in fueling nuclear fusion reactions.
