= Zhang Kejian =

Chinese politician and engineer

- 张克俭
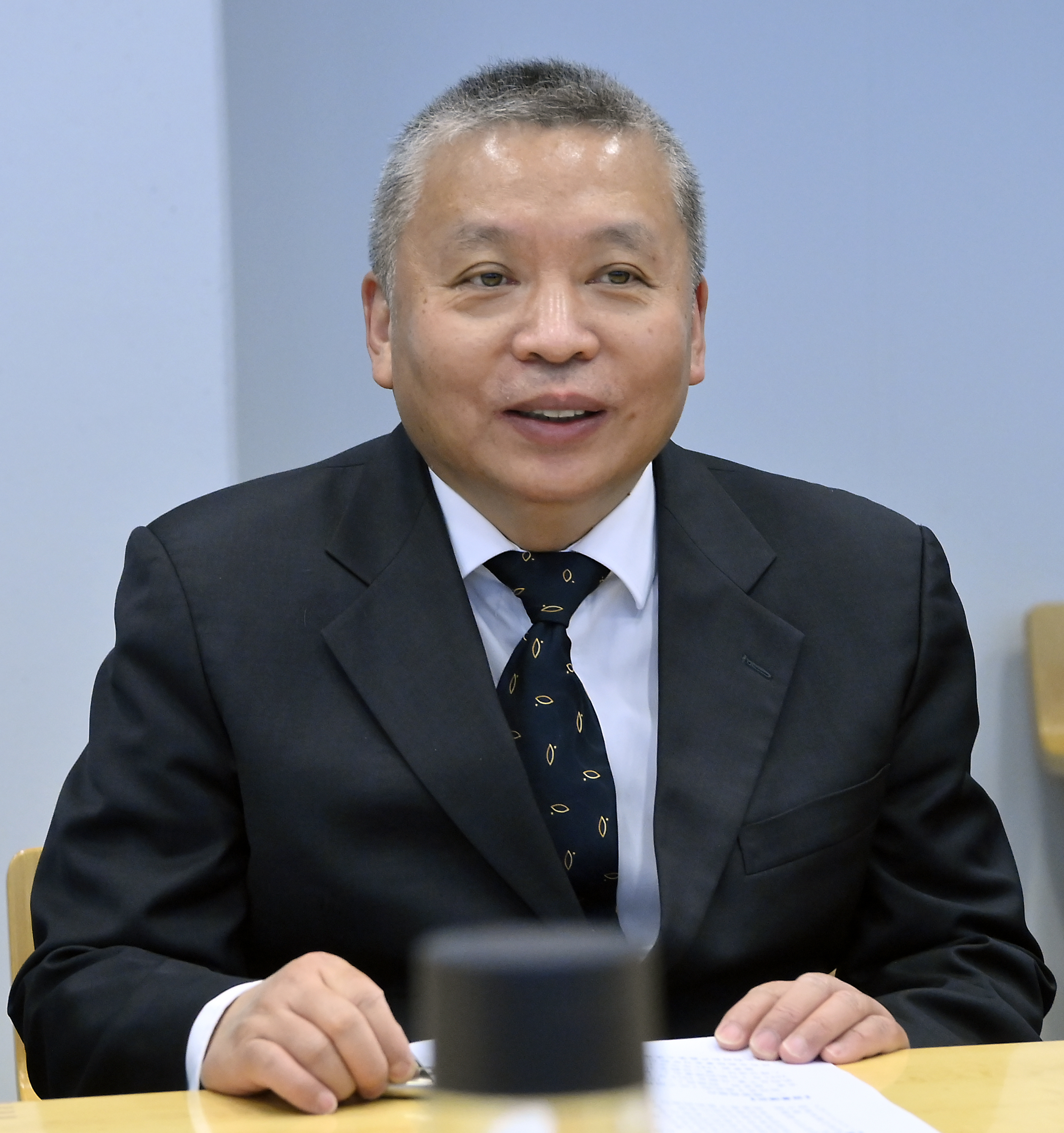

Vice Minister of Industry and Information Technology
- In office 24 May 2018 – 10 January 2025

Director of the State Administration of Science, Technology and Industry for National Defense
- In office 24 May 2018 – 10 January 2025
- Preceded by: Tang Dengjie
- Succeeded by: Shan Zhongde

Director of the China National Space Administration
- Incumbent
- Assumed office 17 May 2018
- Preceded by: Tang Dengjie
- Succeeded by: Shan Zhongde

Personal details
- Born: July 1961 (age 65) Kunshan, Jiangsu, China
- Party: Chinese Communist Party
- Education: University of Science and Technology of China

Zhang Kejian (Chinese: 张克俭; born July 1961) is a Chinese politician and engineer who served as the Director of the China National Space Administration from 2018 to 2025.

== Biography ==
Zhang was born in Kunshan, Jiangsu province. He joined the Communist Party in June 1992, ten years after starting work. He graduated from the PLA Academy of Science and Technology with a degree in physics. He worked for most of his career at the China Academy of Engineering Physics. He was made party chief of the organization in December 2007. In September 2015, he was transferred to work at the State Administration for Science, Technology and Industry for National Defence as deputy chief.

In May 2018, he became head of the China National Space Administration.

Zhang was named one of Time magazine's 100 Most Influential People of 2019.

Zhang reportedly "turned himself in" for corruption in May 2025. In March 2026, he was removed from his position as a member of the Standing Committee of the 14th National Committee of the Chinese People's Political Consultative Conference and his membership was revoked.

Political offices
Preceded by Tang Dengjie	Vice Minister of Industry and Information Technology; Director of the China National Space Administration; 2018–present	Incumbent
