= Tian Shi (crater) =

Crater on the Moon

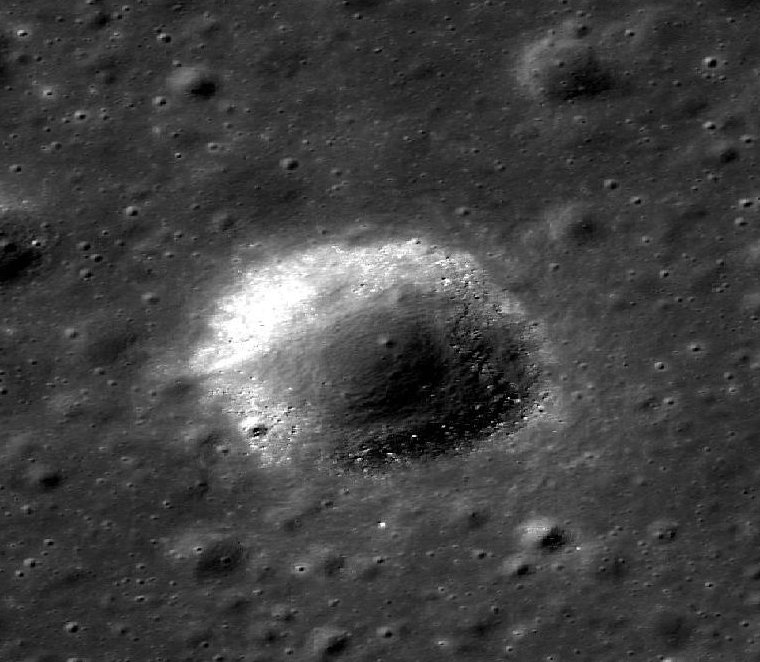
- Lunar Reconnaissance Orbiter image of Tian Shi
- Coordinates: 44.10°N 19.45°W
- Diameter: 0.47 km
- Eponym: Heavenly Market enclosure (romanized name)

Tian Shi is a crater on the Moon. Its name was adopted by the International Astronomical Union in 2015 after one of the three enclosures in an ancient Chinese star map.
