= Zi Wei (crater) =

Crater on the Moon

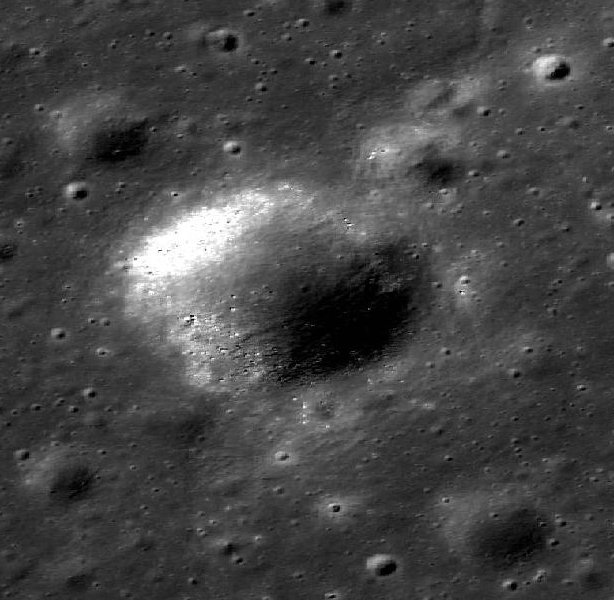
- Lunar Reconnaissance Orbiter image of Zi Wei
- Planet: Moon
- Coordinates: 44.12°N 19.52°W
- Diameter: 0.42 km
- Eponym: Ziwei enclosure

Zi Wei is a crater on the Moon. Its name was adopted by the International Astronomical Union in 2015 after one of the three enclosures in an ancient Chinese star map.
