= China National Space Administration =

National space agency of the People's Republic of China

- 国家航天局

Agency overview
- Abbreviation: CNSA
- Formed: 22 April 1993; 33 years ago
- Preceding agency: Ministry of Aerospace Industry (partial)
- Type: Space agency
- Jurisdiction: State Council of the People's Republic of China
- Headquarters: Haidian, Beijing
- Administrator: Shan Zhongde
- Vice Administrator: Bian Zhigang
- Chief Engineer: Li Guoping
- Primary spaceports: Jiuquan Satellite Launch Center; Taiyuan Satellite Launch Center; Xichang Satellite Launch Center; Wenchang Space Launch Site
- Annual budget: ▲US$18.15 billion (2023) 28.54% increase (Note: Includes both civilian and military space spending.)
- Website: www.cnsa.gov.cn

China National Space Administration
- Simplified Chinese: 国家航天局
- Traditional Chinese: 國家航天局
- Literal meaning: National Astronautics Administration
Transcriptions
Standard Mandarin
- Hanyu Pinyin: Guójiā Hángtiān Jú
- Bopomofo: ㄍㄨㄛˊ ㄐㄧㄚ ㄏㄤˊ ㄊㄧㄢ ㄐㄩˊ
- Wade–Giles: Kuo^{2}-chia^{1} Hang^{2}-t'ien^{1} Chü^{2}
- IPA: [kwǒtɕjá xǎŋtʰjɛ́n tɕy̌]
Yue: Cantonese
- Yale Romanization: Gwok-gāa Hòhng-tin Guhk
- Jyutping: Gwok3 gaa1 Hong4 tin1 Guk6
- IPA: [kʷɔ̄ːk.káːhɔ̏ːŋtʰīnkùːk]

The China National Space Administration (CNSA) is the national space agency of China. Headquartered in Haidian, Beijing, it is responsible for China's civil space programs and international space cooperation. The CNSA is a national bureau under the Ministry of Industry and Information Technology.

Founded in 1993, the CNSA has pioneered a number of achievements in space for China despite its relatively short history, including becoming the first space agency to land on the far side of the Moon with Chang'e 4, bringing material back from the Moon with Chang'e 5 and 6, and being the second agency who successfully landed a rover on Mars with Tianwen-1. Tianwen-2 is currently exploring the co-orbital near-Earth asteroid 469219 Kamoʻoalewa and is planned to also explore the active asteroid 311P/PanSTARRS. It will also collect regolith samples of Kamo'oalewa.

== History ==
CNSA is an agency created in 1993 when the Ministry of Aerospace Industry was split into CNSA and the China Aerospace Science and Technology Corporation (CASC). The former was to be responsible for policy, while the latter was to be responsible for execution. This arrangement proved somewhat unsatisfactory, as these two agencies were, in effect, one large agency, sharing both personnel and management.

As part of a massive restructuring in 1998, CASC was split into a number of smaller state-owned companies. The intention appeared to have been to create a system similar to Western military procurement, where central government agencies procure services from smaller entities.

Since the passage of the Wolf Amendment in 2011, NASA has been forced by Congress to implement a long-standing exclusion policy with CNSA ever since, though this has been periodically overcome.

In 2021, China began building the Tiangong space station, which consists of three modules designated for crew, cargo, and research. The construction was completed in late 2022, and there are plans to add an additional three modules.

== Function ==
CNSA was established as a government institution to develop and fulfill China's due international obligations, with the approval by the 8th National People's Congress of China (NPC). The 9th NPC assigned CNSA as an internal structure of the Commission of Science, Technology and Industry for National Defense (COSTIND). CNSA assumes the following main responsibilities: signing governmental agreements in the space area on behalf of organizations, inter-governmental scientific and technical exchanges; and also being in charge of the enforcement of national space policies and managing the national space science, technology and industry.

China has signed governmental space cooperation agreements with Argentina, Brazil, Chile, France, Germany, India, Italy, Pakistan, Russia, Ukraine, the United Kingdom, the United States, and some other countries.

== Administrators ==
The most recent administrator is Zhang Kejian. Wu Yanhua is vice-administrator and Tian Yulong is secretary general.

- April 1993: Liu Jiyuan
- April 1998: Luan Enjie
- 2004: Sun Laiyan
- July 2010: Chen Qiufa
- March 2013: Ma Xingrui
- December 2013: Xu Dazhe
- May 2017: Tang Dengjie
- May 2018: Zhang Kejian

== Departments ==
There are four departments under the CNSA:

- Department of General Planning
- Department of System Engineering
- Department of Science, Technology and Quality Control
- Department of Foreign Affairs

CNSA's logo is a similar design to that of China Aerospace Science and Technology Corporation. The arrow in the middle is similar to the Chinese character 人 which means 'human' or 'people', to symbolise humanity and communal effort in addition to the motion of an arrow. The three concentric ellipses stand for three types of escape velocity (minimum speed needed to reach sustainable orbits, to escape the Earth system, and to escape the Solar System) which are milestones of space exploration. The second ring is drawn with a bold line, to state that China has passed the first stage of exploration (Earth system) and is undergoing the second stage exploration (within the Solar System). The 人 character stands above the three rings to emphasize humanity's capability to escape and explore.

== Launch facilities ==
- Jiuquan Satellite Launch Center
- Taiyuan Satellite Launch Center
- Xichang Satellite Launch Center
- Wenchang Space Launch Site
Location of China's spaceports

== See also ==
- Chinese Lunar Exploration Program
- Planetary Exploration of China
- Tiangong space station
