= Chang'e 8 =

Planned Chinese lunar exploration mission

- Mission type: Lander, lunar rover, robot
- Operator: CNSA

Spacecraft properties
- Manufacturer: CAST

Start of mission
- Launch date: 2028-29 (planned)
- Rocket: Long March 5
- Launch site: Wenchang

Moon lander
- Landing site: Leibnitz Beta

Chang'e 8 (Chinese: 嫦娥八号; pinyin: Cháng'é báhào) is a planned robotic mission by China to explore the lunar south pole and to establish the technical predicate for the future International Lunar Research Station (ILRS). The mission is expected to launch in 2028-29 and will include a lander, a rover, and a robot.

== Overview ==
China intends to launch the Chang'e 8 mission as part of its plan to construct the International Lunar Research Station during the 2030s. Chang'e 8 will follow in the footsteps of the Chang'e 7 mission, planned for 2027, and continue the latter mission's physical investigation of the lunar south pole region while pursuing new experiments such as in-situ resource utilization, which will include testing the feasibility of 3D-printing "bricks" using lunar soil while on the lunar surface. The mission will serve as the basis for a larger scale robotic and crewed lunar research station during the ensuing decade.

The mission will include 200 kilograms of "piggyback" payload capacity available for international instruments. CNSA has set December 31, 2023 as the deadline for the submission of letters of intent by interested parties to contribute payloads to the mission.

Starvision Aerospace Group Limited, a Chinese commercial satellite design and data analysis company, Zhejiang University, and Turkiye's Middle East Technical University also will jointly develop two 5-kilogram micro-robots for the mission in order to facilitate lunar surface exploration. In addition, the mission will feature a larger 100-kilogram roving robot to deploy and install instruments and to otherwise explore the lunar surface; the development of this larger robot is being led by the Hong Kong University of Science and Technology and involves several Chinese Universities, the Shanghai Academy of Spaceflight Technology, and the South African National Space Agency.

== Potential landing areas ==
Wang Qiong, deputy chief designer of the Chang'e-8 mission, indicated possible lunar south pole landing areas include the following regions: Leibnitz Beta, Amundsen crater, Cabeus crater, and the ridge connecting the Shackleton and de Gerlache craters. In April 2025, media report suggests that CNSA has narrowed its site selection focus to a plateau near Mons Mouton, also known as Leibnitz Beta, near the lunar south pole.

== Scientific objectives ==
In the October 2023 document that accompanied CNSA's announcement of international cooperation opportunities for the Chang'e-8 mission, the following mission aims are listed:

- Detection and research of multiple physical fields at the lunar surface
- Detection and research of the geologic profiles at the landing region
- Moon-based observation of Earth's atmospheric energy-balance and of Earth's magnetosphere
- Experiment and research on lunar in-situ sample analyses and in-situ resource utilization
- Experiment and research employing an enclosed mini-terrestrial-ecosystem on the lunar surface

== International Collaboration ==
The Chang'e-8 mission has offered 200 kg (440 lb) of payload capacity for interested countries.

In an MoU signed on 5 February 2025, by SUPARCO, the national space agency of Pakistan, and by CNSA, Pakistan will launch its first Lunar Rover aboard the Chang'e-8 mission as a part of the wider ILRS program. Reportedly, SUPARCO will provide a 35-kilogram (77 lb) rover for lunar exploration.

On 24 April 2025, CNSA announced the selection of several collaborative projects with 11 international partners for inclusion on the Chang'e-8 mission; these international partners include national and regional organizations.

== Mission instruments ==
Currently, the science payloads on the mission include the following:

=== CNSA instruments ===
Lander

- Landing Camera
- Topography Cameras
- Lunar Seismometer
- Lunar Low Frequency Electromagnetic Field Detector
- Lunar Regolith Heat Flow Meter
- Moon-based Earth Radiometer
- Moon-based Earth Multispectral Imager
- Soft X-ray Telescope
- Mini Terrestrial Ecological Experimental Device
- In-situ Resource Utilization (ISRU) Testing Device; including 3D-printing of "bricks" using lunar soil

Rover

- Panoramic Camera
- Ground Penetrating Radar
- Infrared Spectrum Mineral Analyzer
- In-situ Lunar Sample Analysis and Storage Device

=== International Payloads ===
- Lunar surface multi-functional operation robot and mobile charging station (Hong Kong University of Science and Technology and the Hong Kong Polytechnic University)
- Pakistan lunar rover (Space and Upper Atmosphere Research Commission of Pakistan (SUPARCO) and the International Society for Terrain-Vehicle Systems)
- Intelligent exploration robot for challenging environments (two micro-rovers) (Middle East Technical University of Turkey, in partnership with Zhejiang University and commercial company Star.Vision)
- Radio astronomy array (South African Radio Astronomy Observatory and the National Commission for Aerospace Research and Development of Peru)
- Laser corner reflector array (National Institute for Nuclear Physics–Frascati National Laboratories, Italy)
- Lunar plasma-dust environment sensor and the lunar ion and high-energy neutral particle analyzer (Russian Federal Space Agency and the Russian State Space Corporation)
- Lunar neutron analyzer (Ministry of Higher Education, Science, Research and Innovation of Thailand and the National Astronomical Research Institute of Thailand)
- Visible and infrared imaging system for the lunar surface (Bahrain National Space Science Agency and the Egyptian Space Agency)
- Lunar potential monitor (Iranian Space Agency)

== See also ==
- China National Space Administration (CNSA)
- Chinese space program
  - Chinese Lunar Exploration Program
  - Planetary Exploration of China
- Moonbase
- Artemis program
