= Academy of Aerospace Liquid Propulsion Technology =

Chinese research organization

The Academy of Aerospace Liquid Propulsion Technology (AALPT; Chinese: 航天推进技术研究院) is a research institute affiliated with the China Aerospace Science and Technology Corporation. The institute develops liquid-propellant rocket engines and guidance systems for China's space launchers. It employs about 10,000 people in about ten entities located in the Shaanxi region.

== Activity ==
AALPT's main activity is the development of liquid-propellant rocket engines for Chinese space launchers. The YF-77 and YF-100 engines, which will power the Long March 5 family of launchers, are produced in AALPT's facilities. The conglomerate brings together five research centers and four factories.

== History ==
AALPT was created around 1970 under the base name 067 at Mount Quinling in Shaanxi as part of the industrialization of what was called the Third Front, that is, the inland regions of southwestern China. Later, the company concentrated on the regional capital, Xi'an.

== See also ==
- Long March 5
- Chinese space program
- China Aerospace Science and Technology Corporation (CASC)
- Academy of Aerospace Solid Propulsion Technology (AASPT)
