= Chang'e 7 =

Planned Chinese lunar exploration mission

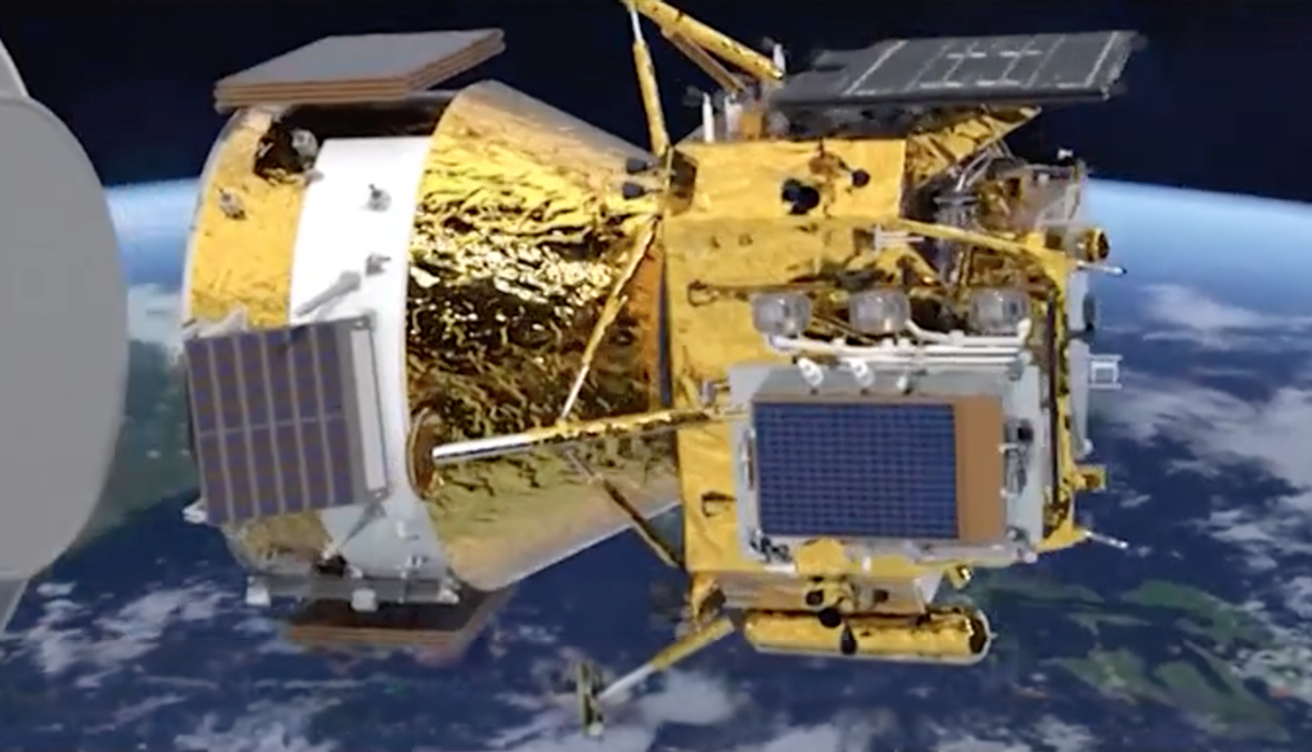
- Artist’s impression of the Chang’e 7 orbiter (left) and lander (right) in Earth orbit
- Mission type: Orbiter, Lander, lunar rover, hopping probe
- Operator: CNSA

Spacecraft properties
- Manufacturer: CAST
- Launch mass: 8,200 kg (18,100 lb)

Start of mission
- Launch date: 2027 (planned)
- Rocket: Long March 5
- Launch site: Wenchang

Moon lander
- Landing site: Peak near the southeast ridge of Shackleton crater 88.8°S 123.4°E

Chang'e 7 (Chinese: 嫦娥七号; pinyin: Cháng'é qīhào) is an upcoming CNSA robotic lunar exploration mission expected to be launched in 2027 to target the lunar south pole. Like its predecessors, the spacecraft is named after the Chinese moon goddess Chang'e. The mission will include an orbiter, a lander, a mini-hopping probe, and a rover, and will launch on a Long March 5 rocket.

== Overview ==
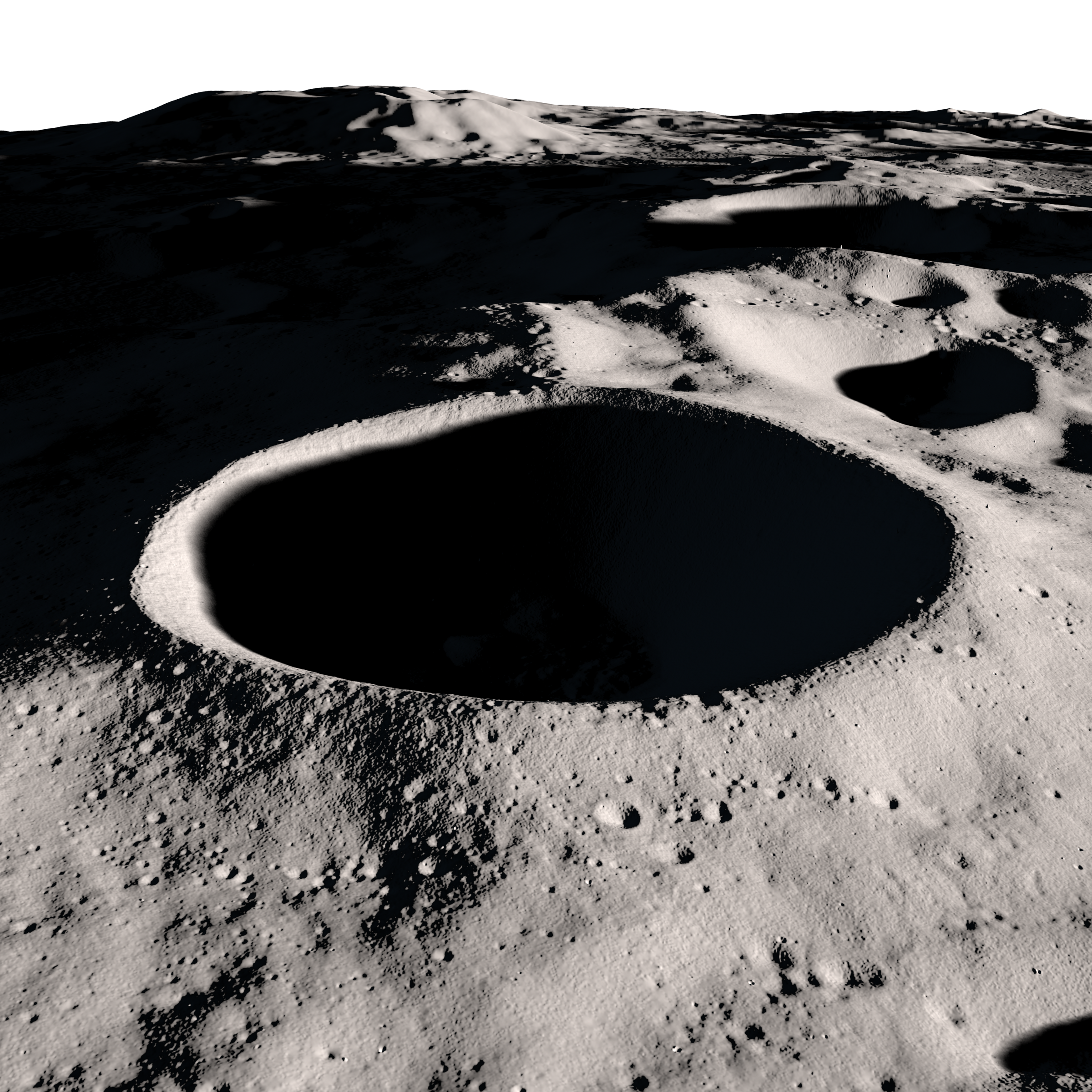
Shackleton crater, Chang'e 7 landing site.

The Chinese Lunar Exploration Program was designed to be conducted in four phases of incremental technological advancement: The first was reaching lunar orbit, a task completed by Chang'e 1 in 2007 and Chang'e 2 in 2010. The second was landing and roving on the Moon, as Chang'e 3 did in 2013 and Chang'e 4 did in 2019. The third was collecting lunar samples from the near-side and far-side of the Moon and sending them to Earth, a task accomplished by Chang'e 5 in 2020 and by the Chang'e 6 mission in 2024. The fourth phase is expected to begin with Chang'e 7 and continue with development of a robotic research station near the Moon's south pole. The program aims to facilitate a crewed lunar landing in the 2030s and possibly build an outpost near the lunar south pole.

From launch, the craft will take around 6 days to reach Lunar orbit.

The Chang'e-7 mission features a novel lunar scout that will aid the rover to look for water at the south pole of the moon. The scout, propelled by rocket propulsion, will explore regions that no rovers can. The robot will be powered by solar energy and will be equipped with cameras and a scientific instrument to analyze the lunar environment.

The Chang'e-7 mission will try to land near at the illuminated rim of Shackleton crater near SPA basin and the lunar south pole. The mission will search for water ice and evaluate the site for a future lunar research base. The spacecraft was delivered to Wenchang Space Launch Site in April 2026, and rolled out to the launchpad mated to Long March 5 Y14 on 19 August 2026.

If successful, the landing will be the closest to a lunar pole that any spacecraft has touched down, the landing site will be in the vicinity of permanently shadowed regions.

== Scientific objectives ==
The official scientific objectives of Chang'e 7 mission are:

- Investigation and study of lunar surface environment and water ice in its soil.
- High-precision investigation and study of morphology, composition and structure of the Moon.
- Investigation and study of interior structure, magnetic field and thermal characteristics of the Moon.
- General investigation and study of surface environment of the south pole of the Moon.
- Moon-based observation and study of the Earth's magnetotail and plasmasphere.

== Scientific payloads ==
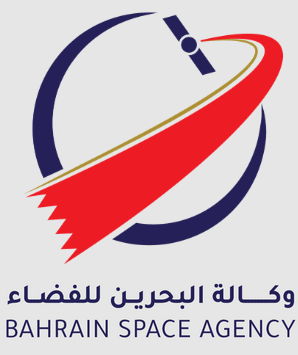
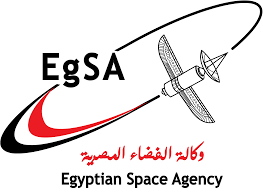
Some of the logos of the governing agencies from the countries providing international payloads for the Chang’e-7 mission, affixed to the payload fairing of the Long March 5 rocket: Bahrain Space Agency, Egyptian Space Agency, Roscosmos State Corporation, and Thailand’s Ministry of Higher Education, Science, Research, and Innovation.

Chang'e-7 will carry a total of 21 scientific payloads, including 6 international payloads, aiming to conduct detailed exploration of the environment and resources in the south polar region of the Moon. Mission objectives include fixed-point landings. In situ observations of the permanently shadowed crater will be made by the mini-hopping probe, which will carry water molecule and hydrogen isotope analyzers.

Lunar orbiter

- High Resolution Stereo Mapping Camera
  - At an altitude of 100 km, the resolution of the lunar surface is better than 0.5 m, and the imaging width is greater than 18 km
  - At an altitude of 15 km, the resolution of the lunar surface is better than 0.075 m, and the imaging width is greater than 0.9 km
- Miniature Synthetic Aperture Radar
  - Imaging resolution better than 0.3 m
- Wide Band Infrared Spectrum Mineral Imaging Analyzer
- Lunar Neutron Gamma Spectrometer
- Lunar Orbit Magnetometer
- Lunar Surface Material Hyperspectral Imager (jointly developed by the Egyptian Space Agency and the Bahrain National Space Science Agency)
- Moon-based Dual-channel Earth Radiation Spectrometer
- Space Weather Global Monitoring Sensor Device (Developed by the Ministry of Higher Education, Research and Innovation of Thailand and the National Astronomical Research Institute of Thailand)

Lunar lander

- Landing Camera
- Topography Camera
- Lunar Surface Environment Detection System
  - Electric field probe
  - Low-energy ion probe
  - Low-energy electron probe
  - Intermediate/high energy particle probe
  - Dust probe
- Lunar Seismograph
- Laser Corner Reflector Array (developed by the Italian National Institute of Nuclear Physics-Frascati National Laboratory)
- Lunar Dust and Electric Field Probe (developed by the Russian Academy of Space Sciences)
- Moon-based Astronomical Observation Telescope (developed by the International Lunar Observatory Association)

Lunar rover

- Panoramic Camera
- Rover Magnetometer
- Lunar Penetrating Radar
- Lunar Raman Spectrometer
- In-situ Measuring System of Volatiles and Isotopes on Lunar Surface

Mini-hopping probe

- Water Molecule and Hydrogen Isotope Analyzer

== History ==
The probe is planned to be launched by a Long March 5 rocket, from the Wenchang Satellite Launch Center on Hainan Island.

The original launch was scheduled between August 23 and 24, 2026. However, this has been indefinitely delayed. On this delay, the China Manned Space Agency stated:

[The] Chang'e-7 lunar probe does not meet launch conditions, and its launch therefore cannot take place during the planned window this year. The assessment was conducted following the principle of prudence, reliability and absolute mission success.

As of August 23, 2026, an updated launch date has not been announced.

The official reason for the launch delay has not been announced, but it is speculated that it may have been affected by Tropical Storm Narra near the Wenchang launch site, which was hovering over the Gulf of Tonkin at the time.

== See also ==
- China National Space Administration – National space agency of the People's Republic of China (CNSA)
- Chinese space program
  - Chinese Lunar Exploration Program – Lunar research program (2004–present)
  - Planetary Exploration of China – Chinese Solar System exploration program
- List of missions to the Moon
