= Tianwen-4 =

Planned Chinese Jupiter orbiter mission

Tianwen-4 天问四号
- Mission type: Jupiter and Callisto orbiter Callisto lander
- Operator: CNSA

Spacecraft properties
- Manufacturer: CAST
- Launch mass: Total: 5,000 kg (11,000 lb); Jupiter–Callisto Orbiter: 4,000 kg (8,800 lb); Interplanetary flyby probe: 1,000 kg (2,200 lb)

Start of mission
- Launch date: September 2029 (proposed)
- Rocket: Long March 5
- Launch site: Wenchang

Flyby of Venus (gravity assist)
- Closest approach: April 2030 (proposed)

Flyby of Earth (gravity assist)
- Closest approach: February 2031 (proposed)

Flyby of Earth (gravity assist)
- Closest approach: May 2033 (proposed)

Jupiter orbiter
- Orbital insertion: December 2035 (proposed)
- Orbital departure: February 2038 (proposed)

Callisto orbiter
- Orbital insertion: February 2038 (proposed)

Callisto lander
- Landing date: after February 2038 (proposed)

Tianwen-4 (Chinese: 天问四号; pinyin: Tiānwèn Sì Hào), formerly known as Gan De (Chinese: 甘德; pinyin: Gān Dé), is a planned Chinese interplanetary mission to study the Jovian system, including orbiting Jupiter's second-largest moon Callisto. The mission also includes a probe that will attempt a landing on Callisto. A second spacecraft which would make a flyby of Uranus was mentioned at a conference in 2022, but wasn't mentioned in a 2026 notice.

== Overview ==
The goals of the planned Tianwen-4 Jupiter mission include: study of the interaction between magnetic fields and plasma present in the Jovian system, examination of the compositional variations in the Jovian atmosphere, exploration of the internal structures and surface characteristics of either Ganymede or Callisto, as well as investigation of the space environment surrounding the aforementioned Galilean satellites.

The spacecraft will make flybys of Jupiter's irregular satellites before it enters into a polar orbit about Callisto. The mission profile includes a Callisto lander. Presentations by Chinese researchers suggest that the mission may include an additional probe that would conduct a fly-by of Uranus sometime after 2040.

The original name of this mission referred to the 4th century BC ancient Chinese astronomer Gan De, who made early planetary observations and reputedly first observed the Galilean moons with the unaided eye.

== Background ==
After completing successful robotic lunar orbital missions (Chang'e 1 and Chang'e 2) and a robotic lunar lander/rover mission (Chang'e 3), CNSA began to contemplate more ambitious interplanetary missions in the 2020s and beyond. In 2018, Pei Zhaoyu, the deputy director of CNSA's Lunar Exploration and Space Program Center stated that China was planning to conduct four major interplanetary missions before the end of the 2020s; the four missions include a mission to Mars (Tianwen-1), a main-belt comet and asteroid sample-return mission (Tianwen-2), a Mars sample-return mission (Tianwen-3), and a Jupiter system mission.

== Possible mission timeline ==
One possible Earth–Jupiter mission trajectory and timeline was presented at the 2020 General Assembly meetings of the EGU. Under this scenario, the Tianwen-4 probe would launch in September 2029, conduct a Venus fly-by six months later in April 2030, (Note: The closest-approach to Venus is anticipated to be about 6,011 kilometers) then proceed to encounter Earth twice (the first encounter occurring in February 2031 (Note: Earth closest-approach: 5,482 kilometers) and the second in May 2033 (Note: Earth closest-approach: 1,386 kilometers)). Before arriving at Jupiter, the sub-probe will separate from the main probe and continue towards Uranus for a flyby in March 2045.

The main probe will enter Jupiter orbit in December 2035. After 1 or 2 braking passes, the probe will stay in a large elliptical orbit around Jupiter with a period of 30 days, making flybys of irregular moons. It will conduct 10 orbits over about a year before entering its second phase with two gravity assists of Callisto. In February 2038, Tianwen-4 will enter orbit around Callisto with an altitude of 300 km and an orbital period of 17.7 hours Subsequently, the orbiter will release a probe which will attempt a landing on Callisto's surface.

== Mission overview ==
Tianwen-4 will fly by several irregular Jovian satellites before entering a polar orbit around Callisto. This mission includes a lander which, like the Chang'e lunar landers, would provide unprecedented insights into the moon's formation and evolution. On 13 November 2026, CNSA issued a notice which called for proposals from domestic and foreign organizations to fly scientific instruments on both the orbiter and lander portions of the mission; this call for proposals is the "most definitive signal to date" that a Callisto landing attempt is part of the mission plan. Tianwen-4 also may include a secondary spacecraft that will fly towards an encounter with Uranus sometime in the late 2040s.

Callisto is the outermost of the four Galilean moons. Its interior experiences less heating due to gravity from the other moons and Jupiter. It likely formed with leftover Jupiter material and has sat mostly dormant since, with only asteroid impacts to modify its surface. The moon thus preserves a history of the early Jupiter system and the Solar System at large for a lander to study. Callisto also has a thin atmosphere with small amounts of oxygen, increasing its scientific allure despite being less glamorous than fellow subsurface ocean moons Europa and Ganymede and volatile, active Io. Callisto is also the least challenging Jovian moon to land on. A spacecraft requires less fuel to reach it, and it sits outside Jupiter's intense radiation field. These are rationales that argue for Callisto as the main mission target.

=== Previous alternate plan ===
Before the current plan was settled on, an alternate called the Jupiter Systems Observer (JSO) was also considered, which would have focused on an in-depth investigation of the Jovian moon Io rather than Callisto. The spacecraft would have performed several Io flybys, studying how Jupiter's gravity tugs on the moon to power its volcanic activity. Like the current plan, JSO would have studied the mass, density, dynamics and chemical and isotopic composition of irregular satellites and would have provided insights into these unique remnants of Jupiter's formation. As an option, JSO could have released one or several small satellites to perform multi-point studies of the dynamics of the Jovian magnetosphere.

At the end of its tour JSO could have sent to orbit the Sun–Jupiter L1 point, where Jupiter's gravity balances with the Sun's so that spacecraft can remain for long periods of time. From this unique perch where no spacecraft has ever visited, JSO could have monitored the solar wind outside of Jupiter's magnetic field, and surveyed the irregular Jovian moons from afar.

== Mission instruments ==
Potential scientific instruments for the Tianwen-4 mission were discussed during a session of the 2020 General Assembly of the European Geosciences Union that took place in May 2020. The possible instruments were categorized into four payload packages designed to address the two main goals of the mission: answering questions on the formation and current "workings" (Note: These involve the Jovian system's energy transfer processes such as the tidal transfer and dissipation of gravitational energy between the planet, moons, the plasma torus, and the entire magnetosphere.) of the Jovian system. The four payload packages are: (A) plasma and dust analyzers, (B) multi-wavelength spectroscopic instruments, (C) geology/glaciology/geochemistry analyzers, and (D) radio/optical links and radio science instruments.

=== Plasma and dust analyzers package ===
- Thermal plasma spectrometer (100 eV to 100 keV)
- High-energy charged particle detector and energetic neutral atom (ENA) analyzer
- Ion and neutral mass spectrometer
- Magnetometer
- Radio and plasma wave spectrometer
- Cosmic dust detector with mass spectrometer

=== Multi-wavelength imaging/spectroscopy package ===
- Visible-wavelength imaging camera
- Near-infrared imager/spectrometer
- Far-infrared/submillimeter wave radiometer/spectrometer
- Ultra-violet imager/spectrometer

=== Geology/glaciology/geochemistry analyzers package ===
- High-mass resolution and large mass range mass spectrometer

(fed-by sampling system for ice surface and by pyrolyser [for refractory component])

=== Radio + optical link + radio science package ===
- Transmission/reception radio link to Earth for Doppler tracking and occultation measurements
- Inter-platform radio links for additional Doppler tracking and occultation measurements
- "PRIDE" astrometry experiment (Very-long-baseline interferometry tracking of each flight element)
- Altimeter (with meter-level accuracy)

=== 2024 Update ===
According to the paper "Research and Prospects of Jupiter System Scientific Exploration" published in China Space Science and Technology, the preliminary payload configuration plan for the Tianwen-4 exploration mission is as follows:

Jupiter Callisto Orbiter

- Microwave radiometer
- Radio Science
- Atmosphere Composition Monitor
- Polarimeter
- Camera
- Spectrometer
- Particle Analyzer
- Magnetometer
- Microwave Rader
- γ/X-ray spectrometer

Interplanetary Flyby Probe

- Camera
- Magnetometer
- Spectrometer
- Radio Science
- Particle Analyzer

=== 2026 Update ===
Callisto Lander

- Surface composition analyzer: Raman spectrometer featuring a laser with a characteristic wavelength of 266 nanometers (in the DUV region of the spectrum)
- Surface magnetometer

== See also ==
- China National Space Administration (CNSA)
- Chinese space program
  - Planetary Exploration of China
- Other Jupiter missions
  - Galileo (spacecraft)
  - Juno (spacecraft)
  - Jupiter Icy Moons Explorer
  - Europa Clipper
