= YF-77 =

Chinese rocket engine

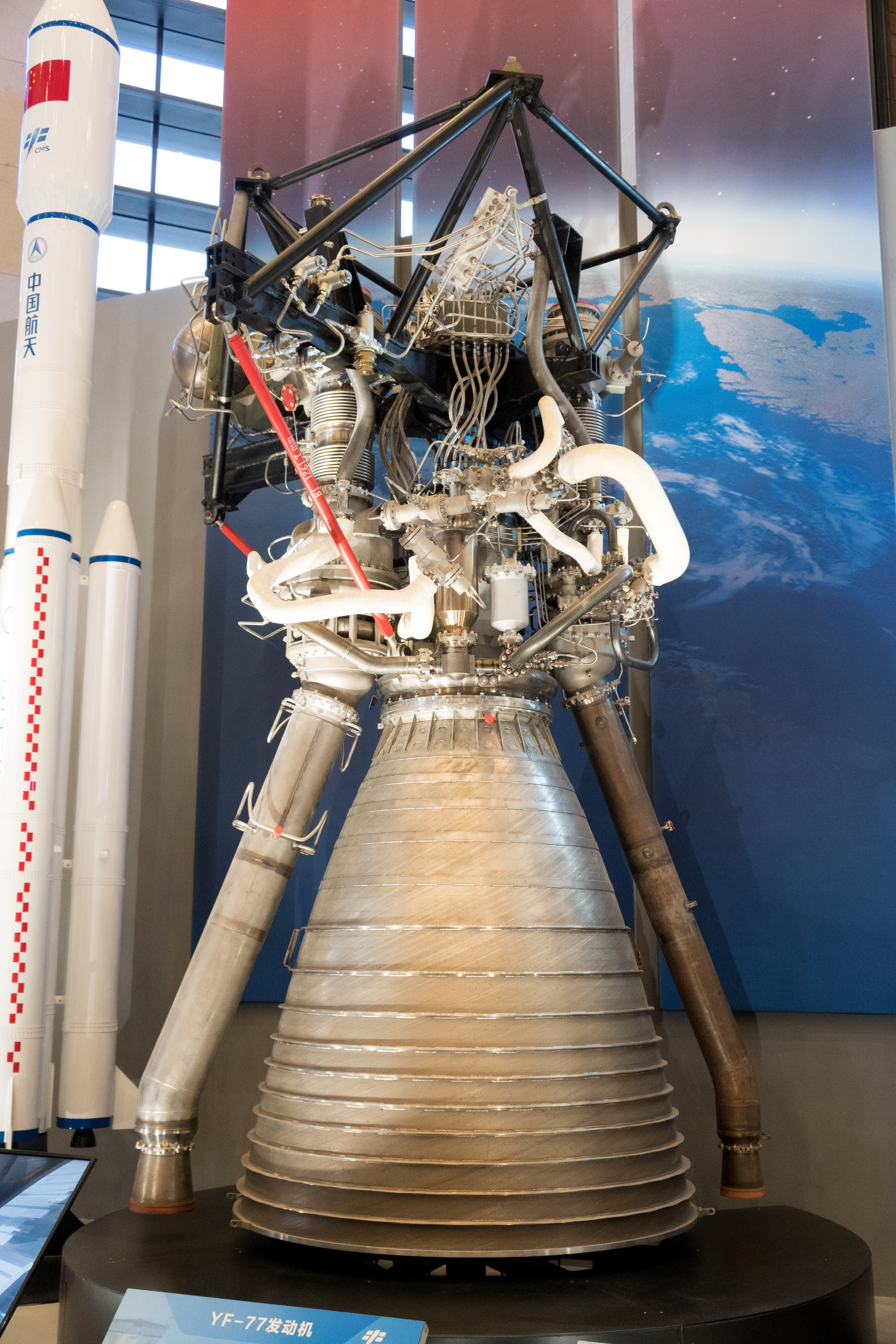
- Country of origin: China
- First flight: Long March 5 inaugural flight (2016-11-03)
- Designer: Academy of Aerospace Liquid Propulsion Technology
- Application: sustainer engine
- Associated LV: Long March 5
- Status: In service

Liquid-fuel engine
- Propellant: Liquid oxygen / Liquid hydrogen
- Mixture ratio: 5.5 (adjustable)
- Cycle: Gas-generator

Configuration
- Chamber: 1
- Nozzle ratio: 49

Performance
- Thrust, vacuum: 700 kN (160,000 lbf)
- Thrust, sea-level: 518 kN (116,000 lbf)
- Chamber pressure: 10.1 MPa (1,460 psi)
- Specific impulse, vacuum: 428.0 seconds (4.197 km/s)
- Specific impulse, sea-level: 316.7 seconds (3.106 km/s)
- Burn time: 525 seconds (8.75 min)

Dimensions
- Length: 2,600 mm (100 in) (with rack)
- Diameter: 1,500 mm (59 in)

Used in
- Long March 5 core stage.

The YF-77 is China's first cryogenic rocket engine developed for booster applications. It burns liquid hydrogen fuel and liquid oxygen oxidizer using a gas generator cycle. A pair of these engines powers the LM-5 core stage. Each engine can independently gimbal in two planes. Although the YF-77 is ignited prior to liftoff, the LM-5's four strap-on boosters provide most of the initial thrust in an arrangement similar to the European Vulcain on the Ariane 5 or the Japanese LE-7 on the H-II.

== Development ==
In January 2002, the development of a new cryogenic engines was approved by the Commission for Science, Technology and Industry for National Defense. The development responsibility was assigned to the Beijing Aerospace Propulsion Institute, a division of the Academy of Aerospace Liquid Propulsion Technology. The preliminary design was accomplished by mid-2002 and the first set of components was manufactured by early 2003. The same year saw the initial component and subsystem tests, with the gas generator successfully performing its first test on July 30. By December 2003 the whole powerpack successfully passed its first integrated test, and on September 17, 2004, a successful 50-second firing of a complete prototype engine was achieved.

In May 2013 the formal qualification testing campaign began. By the end of 2013 more than 70 tests and 24,000 seconds of firing at steady state conditions had been performed by 12 engines. The concept review confirmed that the performance goal and launcher requirements were met, and the engine was ready for integration for the first launch of the Long March 5 rocket. Engine development began in the 2000s, with testing directed by the China National Space Administration (CNSA) commencing in 2005. The engine has been successfully tested by mid-2007.

== Technical description ==
The requirements for an inexpensive, highly reliable, disposable engine are met by using dual 510 kN (110,000 lbf) (sea level) gas generator engines on a single mounting frame. Each engine has dual turbopumps with separate gas exhaust. Both turbines are fed by a single fuel rich gas generator. The combustion chambers and throat are regeneratively cooled, while the nozzle, of welded pipe construction, uses dump cooling. The turbopumps use solid propellant cartridges for start-up, while the gas generator and combustion chamber use pyrotechnic igniters. The valves and prevalves are helium-actuated ball valves. The thrust and mixture ratio are calibrated with venturis and a propellant utilization valve on ground tests. The engine also has dual heat exchanger to supply hot gaseous hydrogen and oxygen for tank pressurization.

All subsystems are attached to the combustion chamber and gimbal is achieved by rotating the whole engine on two orthogonal planes with two independent actuators. The injector plate uses coaxial injectors, some of which are extended to create baffles that prevent high frequency instabilities. The titanium fuel turbopump uses a two-stage pump with inducer and is actuated by a two-stage axial turbine. It rotates at 35,000 rpm and supplies a discharge pressure of 16.5 MPa (2,390 psi). The oxidizer turbopump uses a single-stage centrifugal pump with a helical inducer driven by a two-stage turbine. It rotates at 18,000 rpm and supplies a discharge pressure of 14 MPa (2,000 psi).
