= Academy of Aerospace Solid Propulsion Technology =

Chinese research organization

The Academy of Aerospace Solid Propulsion Technology (AASPT; Chinese: 航天动力技术研究院; also known as "The Fourth Academy") is a research institute affiliated with the China Aerospace Science and Technology Corporation.

The institute develops rocket engines that use solid fuel. The institute, which employs around 10,000 people, includes some ten entities located in the Shaanxi and Hubei regions, and is headquartered in Xi'an. AASPT is a subsidiary of the China Aerospace Science and Technology Corporation (CASC).

== Activity ==
AASPT is China's leading solid fuel propulsion specialist. In particular, it develops DF-31 ground-to-ground ballistic missiles, JL-2 sea-to-ground ballistic missiles, apogee engines for geostationary telecommunications satellites, and China's new Long March 11 light launcher. AASPT employs some 4,000 researchers and senior technicians, and comprises five research institutes, three factories and five subsidiaries. Its total revenue was 5.4 billion yuan in 2014.

== See also ==
- Chinese space program
- China Aerospace Science and Technology Corporation (CASC)
- Academy of Aerospace Liquid Propulsion Technology (AALPT)
