= Venus Volcano Imaging and Climate Explorer =

Venus Volcano Imaging and Climate Explorer (VOICE) was a proposed orbiter mission to Venus by National Space Science Center (NSSC) of Chinese Academy of Sciences. According to the proposal, VOICE would study "Venusian volcanic and thermal evolution history, water and plate tectonics, internal structure and dynamics, climate evolution, possible habitable environment and life information in the clouds". In 2022, the mission was expected to be launched in 2026 by a Long March 3B rocket, and arrive at Venus at 2027, followed by an aerobraking down to the 350 km circular operational orbit. Weighing 2,081kg, VOICE would have three instruments: Polarimetric Synthetic Aperture Radar (PolSAR), Microwave Radiometric Sounder (MWRS) and Ultraviolet-Visible-Near Infrared Multi-Spectral Imager (UVN-MSI), where PolSAR would obtain the world first radar imaging of the surface of Venus with a resolution of 1 meter. The mission was not part of the Tianwen program of China National Space Administration (CNSA), but instead competed with 12 other missions under NSSC's Strategic Priority Program on Space Science phase III (SPP-III) for 2025-2030. According to the National Space Science Medium- and Long-Term Development Plan (2024-2050), the mission was not selected for development. It was replaced by a Venus atmosphere sample return mission expected in the second phase (2028-2035) of the Development Plan, but no details or timelines were announced.

== See also ==
- National Space Science Center (NSSC)
- Chinese space program
  - Chinese Lunar Exploration Program – Lunar research program (2004–present)
  - Planetary Exploration of China – Chinese Solar System exploration program
  - Strategic Priority Program on Space Science (SPP)
- Observations and explorations of Venus
  - Magellan (spacecraft) – NASA orbiter mission to Venus (1989–1994)
  - EnVision – Planned ESA mission to Venus
