= Xuntian =

Planned Chinese space telescope

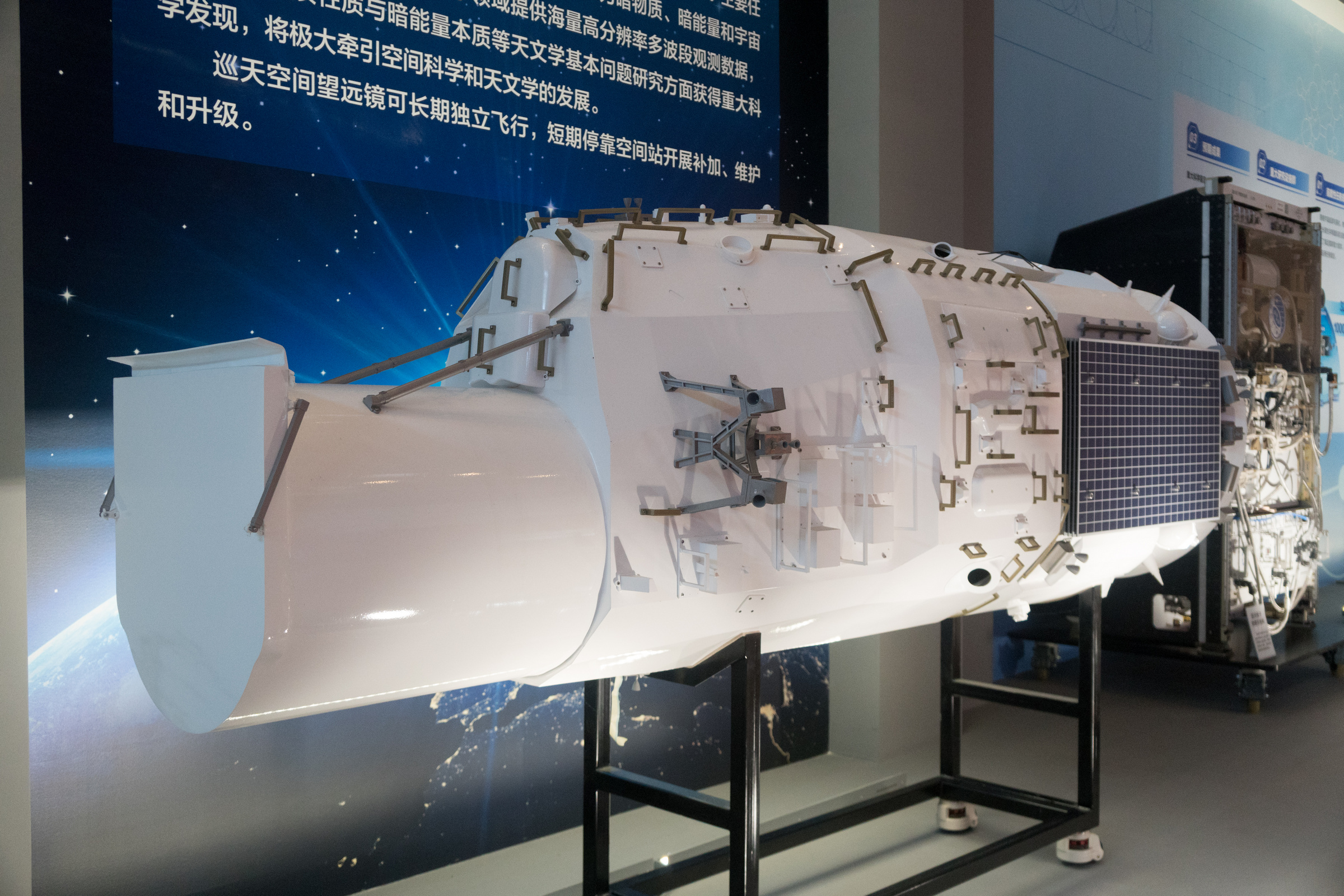
- Xuntian mockup, showing its 2-meter diameter telescope
- Names: Chinese space station survey telescope
- Mission type: Astronomy
- Operator: China Manned Space Agency; National Astronomical Observatories of China
- Mission duration: 10+ years (planned)

Spacecraft properties
- Dry mass: 15,500 kg (34,200 lb)

Start of mission
- Launch date: 2027 (planned)
- Rocket: Long March 5B (5B-Y5)
- Launch site: Wenchang, LC-101
- Contractor: China Aerospace Science and Technology Corporation

Orbital parameters
- Reference system: Low Earth orbit
- Altitude: 400 km (250 mi)

Main telescope
- Diameter: 2 m (6 ft 7 in)
- Focal length: 28 m (92 ft)
- Wavelengths: SC: 0.255–1 μm; HSTDM: 0.41–0.51 GHz
- Resolution: 0.15 arcsec
Instruments
- SC: Survey camera
- IFS: Integral field spectrograph
- MCI: Multichannel imager
- CPI-C: Cool planet imaging coronagraph
- HSTDM: High sensitivity terahertz detection module

The Xuntian (Chinese: 巡天; pinyin: Xúntiān; lit. 'Tour of Heaven') (Note: The name "Xuntian" comes from the Chinese translation of Astronomical survey (巡天调查, Xúntiān Diàochá). Xuntian can also be literally translated as "surveying the sky", "survey to heavens" or "sky patrol".) or Chinese space station survey telescope (CSST) (Chinese: 巡天空间望远镜; pinyin: Xúntiān Kōngjiān Wàngyuǎnjìng) is a Chinese space telescope under development.

The telescope will feature a 2-metre-diameter (6.6-foot) primary mirror and is expected to have a field of view approximately 300 to 350 times larger than that of the Hubble Space Telescope. Its 2.5-gigapixel camera is designed to survey up to 40% of the sky.

As of 2026, Xuntian is scheduled for launch in 2027 aboard a Long March 5B rocket. It is planned to operate in a co-orbital arrangement with the Tiangong space station, allowing periodic docking for servicing and maintenance.

== Overview ==
The telescope uses an unobstructed off-axis optical design, avoiding diffraction effects caused by mirror support structures. This design is intended to improve image quality for observations including weak gravitational lensing measurements.

The primary mission consists of wide-field imaging and slitless spectroscopic surveys covering wavelengths from 255 to 1,000 nm. (Cosmological research is a major scientific objective,) particularly observations at medium and high Galactic and ecliptic latitudes. During its planned ten-year mission, the survey camera is expected to cover approximately 17,500 square degrees of sky in multiple bands, reaching point-source 5σ limiting magnitudes of about 26 (AB magnitude) in the g and r bands. The slitless spectrograph is designed to achieve an average spectral resolution of at least 200.

In addition to the main survey, the telescope will observe selected deep fields to greater depth than the wide-area survey.

The combination of high angular resolution, broad wavelength coverage, imaging and spectroscopic capabilities, and large survey area is intended to support studies of cosmology, galaxy evolution, and related fields.

Observations from Xuntian are expected to complement data collected by other optical space telescopes, including Hubble, Euclid, and Nancy Grace Roman.

Comparison with other optical space telescopes
	Xuntian	Hubble Space Telescope	Euclid	Nancy Grace Roman Space Telescope
Launch	2027 (planned)	1990	2023	2026
Mission duration	10 years (planned)	35+ years (ongoing)	6 years (ongoing)	5 years (ongoing)
Orbit	LEO: 400 km (250 mi)	LEO: 600 km (370 mi)	Sun–Earth L_{2}	Sun–Earth L_{2}
Mirror diameter	2 m (6 ft 7 in)	2.4 m (7 ft 10 in)	1.2 m (3 ft 11 in)	2.4 m (7 ft 10 in)
Camera size (gigapixels)	2.5	0.016	0.6	0.3
Resolution (arcsec)	0.15	0.05	0.1	0.11
Field of view (deg^{2})	1.1	0.002	0.91	0.28
Survey area (deg^{2})	17,500	2	15,000	2,000
Survey area (of sky)	40%	0.005%	33%	5%

== Instruments ==
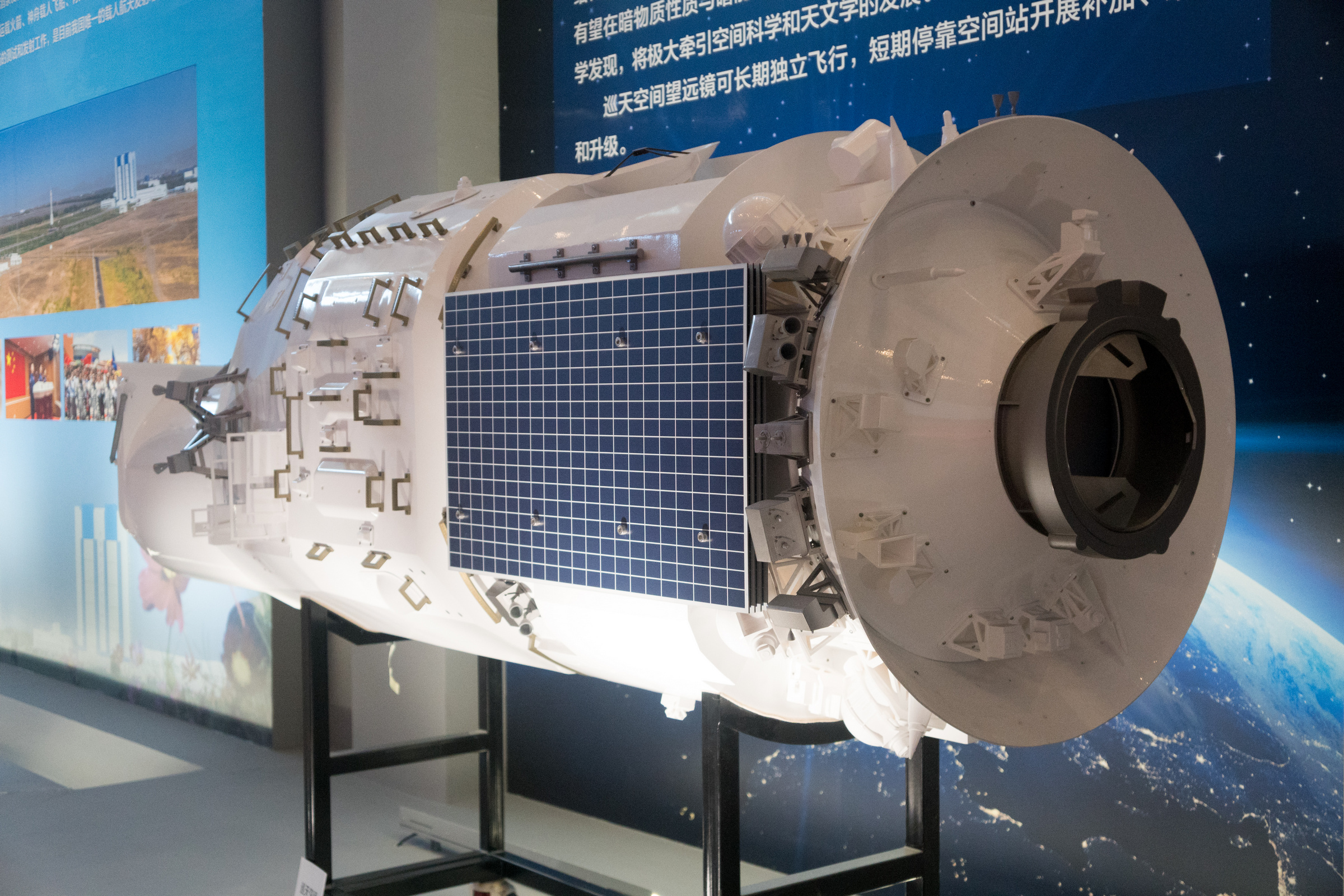
Xuntian Space Telescope mockup, showing its docking port

Xuntian will have six scientific instrument bays, with plans to carry five instruments at launch:

=== Survey camera ===
The survey camera (SC), also known as the multi-colour photometry and slitless spectroscopy survey module, occupies the main focal plane. It comprises a seven-band photometry subsystem (NUV, u, g, r, i, z and y) and a three-band slitless spectroscopy subsystem (GU, GV and GI). The photometry subsystem uses 18 filters and covers about 60 percent of the focal-plane area, while the spectroscopy subsystem uses 12 gratings and covers the remaining 40 percent.

=== Integral field spectrograph ===
The integral field spectrograph (IFS) provides spatial resolution of 0.2 arcseconds and covers wavelengths from 0.35 to 1.0 μm. It is primarily intended for observations of compact, bright targets, including galactic nuclei and star-forming regions. The IFS can observe in parallel with the MCI.

=== Multichannel imager ===
The multichannel imager (MCI) contains three channels covering wavelengths from the near-ultraviolet to the near-infrared. The channels operate simultaneously and use narrow-, medium-, and wide-band filters to conduct deep-field surveys across a field of view of 7.5′ × 7.5′. Combined observations are expected to reach depths of 29–30 AB magnitude. Planned scientific uses include studies of high-redshift galaxies, dark matter, dark energy, and calibration of photometric redshift measurements. The MCI can observe in parallel with the IFS.

=== Cool planet imaging coronagraph ===
The cool planet imaging coronagraph (CPI-C) is designed for high-contrast direct imaging of exoplanets, with an inner working angle of 0.35 arcseconds at visible wavelengths. It is intended to follow up planets identified through radial velocity observations and to study planetary formation, evolution, and protoplanetary disks. The instrument operates over wavelengths of 0.53–1.6 μm and includes seven broad-band filters.

=== High-sensitivity terahertz detection module ===
The high sensitivity terahertz detection module (HSTDM) is designed for space-based observations of terahertz radiation, avoiding atmospheric absorption that limits ground-based observations. It is a high-resolution spectrometer and the first planned spaceborne heterodyne receiver to use a niobium nitride-based superconducting tunnel junction mixer.

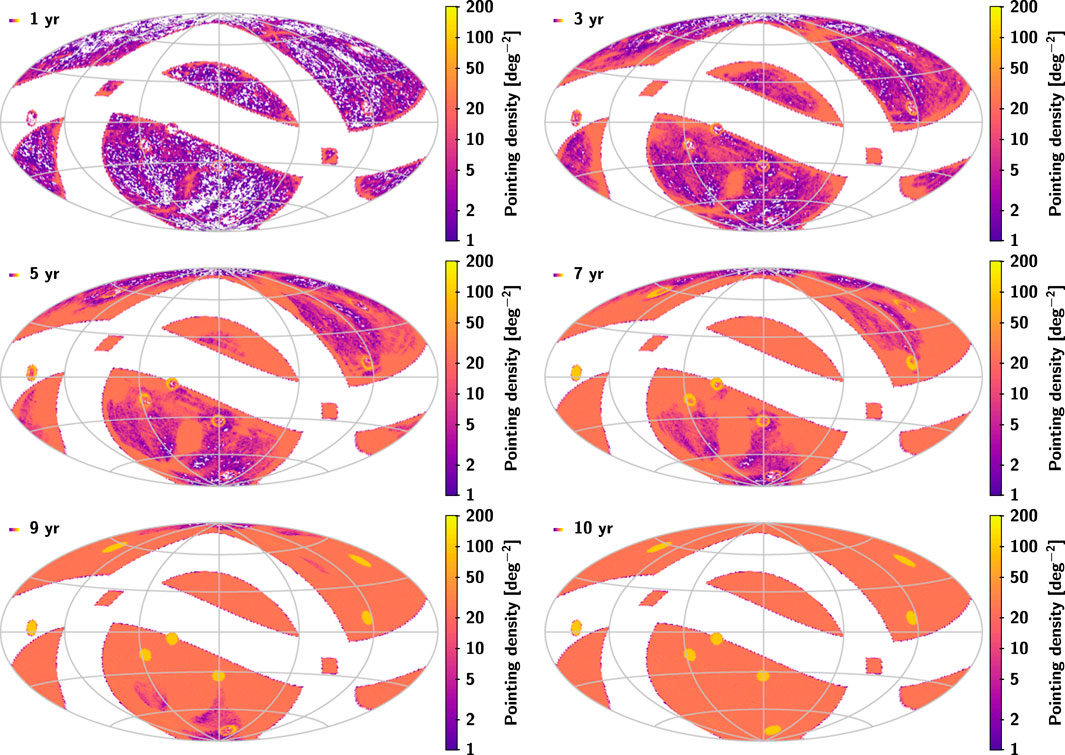
Estimated distribution of the observation pointing centers of the survey. The yellow circles in the bottom right figure are the selected deep fields.

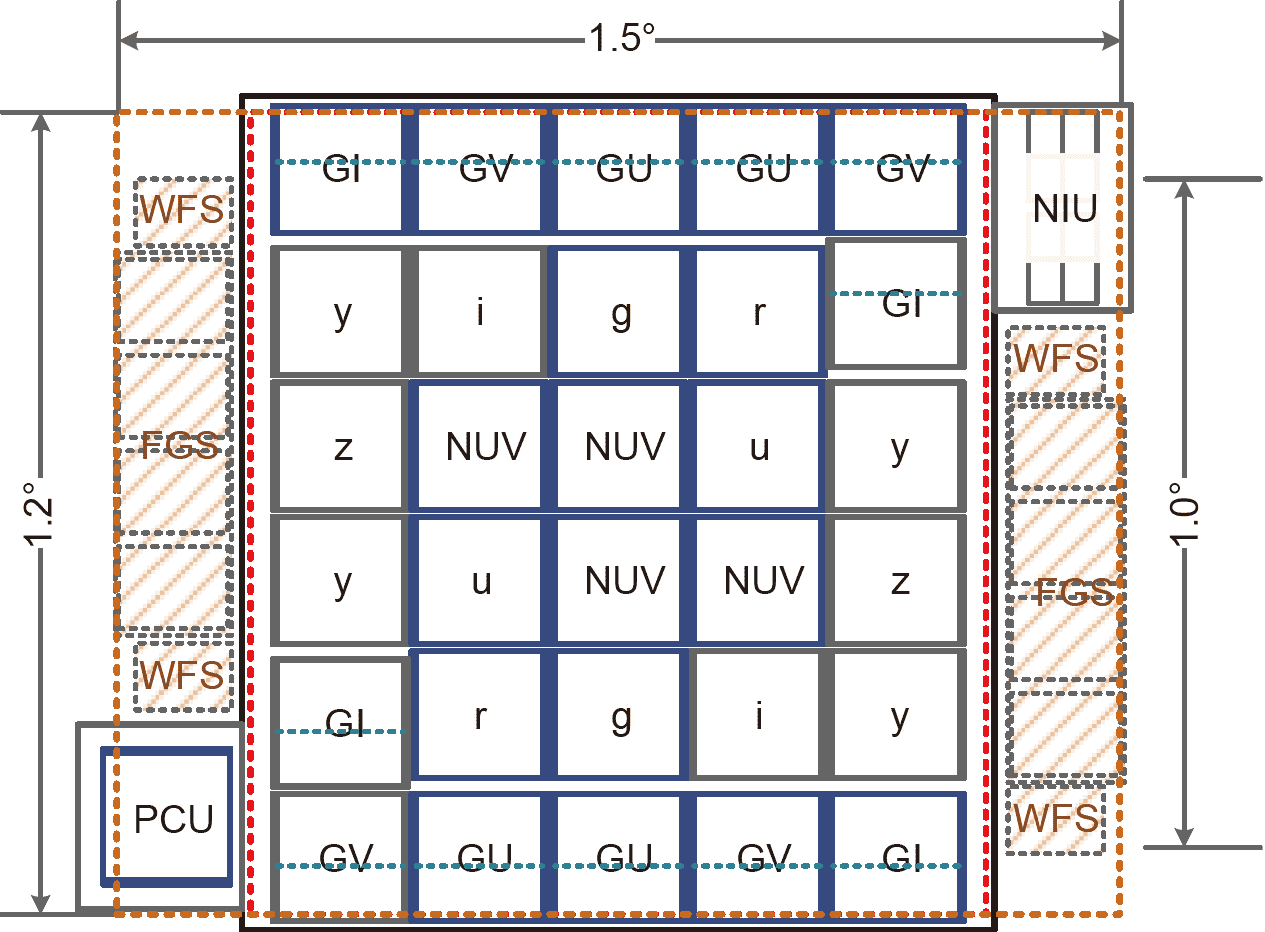
Focal plane arrangement of the CSST survey camera

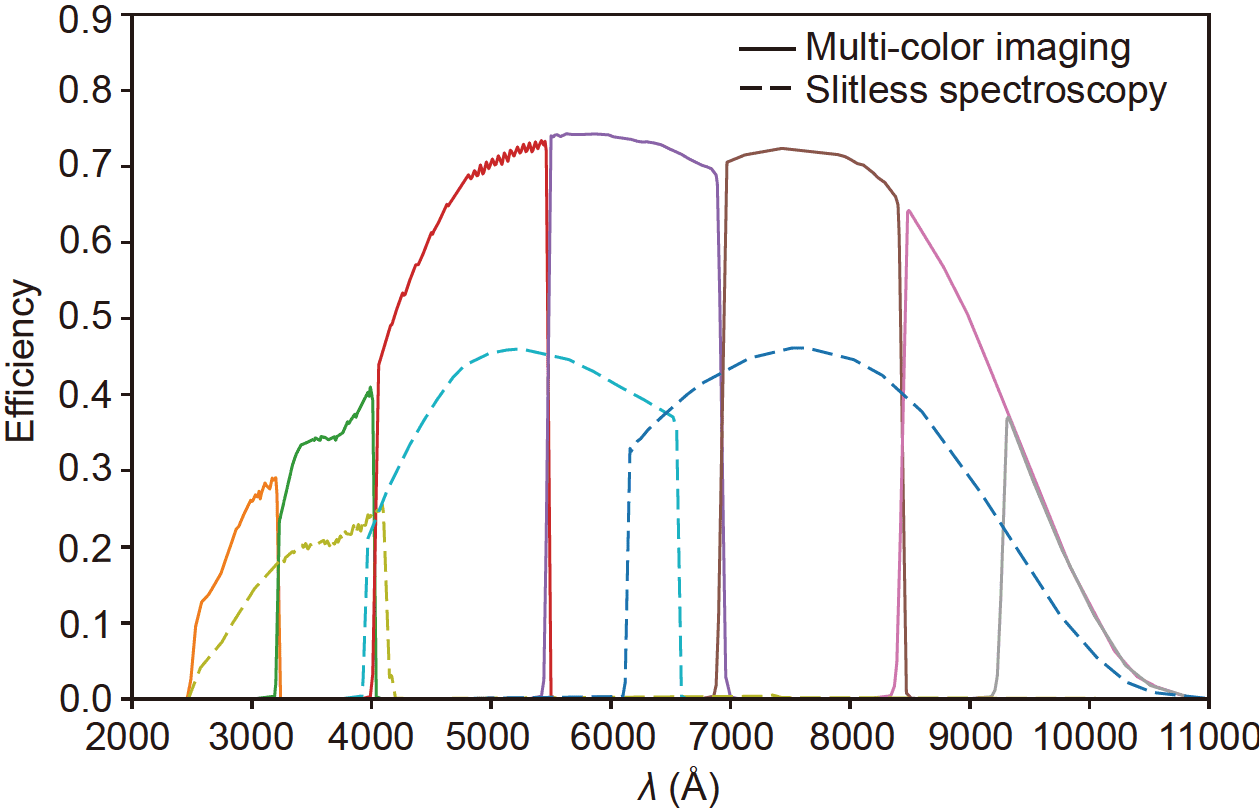
System throughput of CSST survey bands

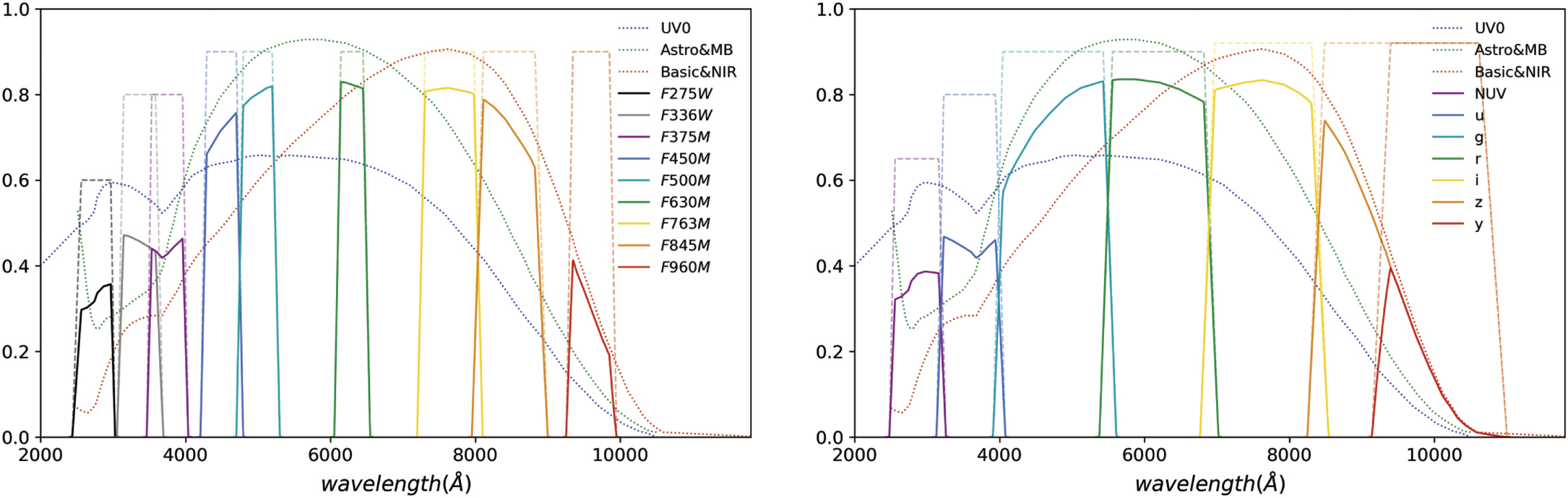
Left: The transmission curves for the nine MCI medium-band filters from NUV to NIR bands. Right: The transmission curves for the seven survey camera filters.

== See also ==
- Hubble Space Telescope – NASA/ESA space telescope launched in 1990
- James Webb Space Telescope – NASA/ESA/CSA space infrared telescope launched in 2021
- Nancy Grace Roman Space Telescope – NASA infrared space telescope launched in 2026
- Euclid (space telescope) – European visible and near-infrared space observatory, launched in 2023
- Lists of telescopes
