= Tianwen-3 =

Planned Chinese Mars sample return mission

Tianwen-3 天问三号
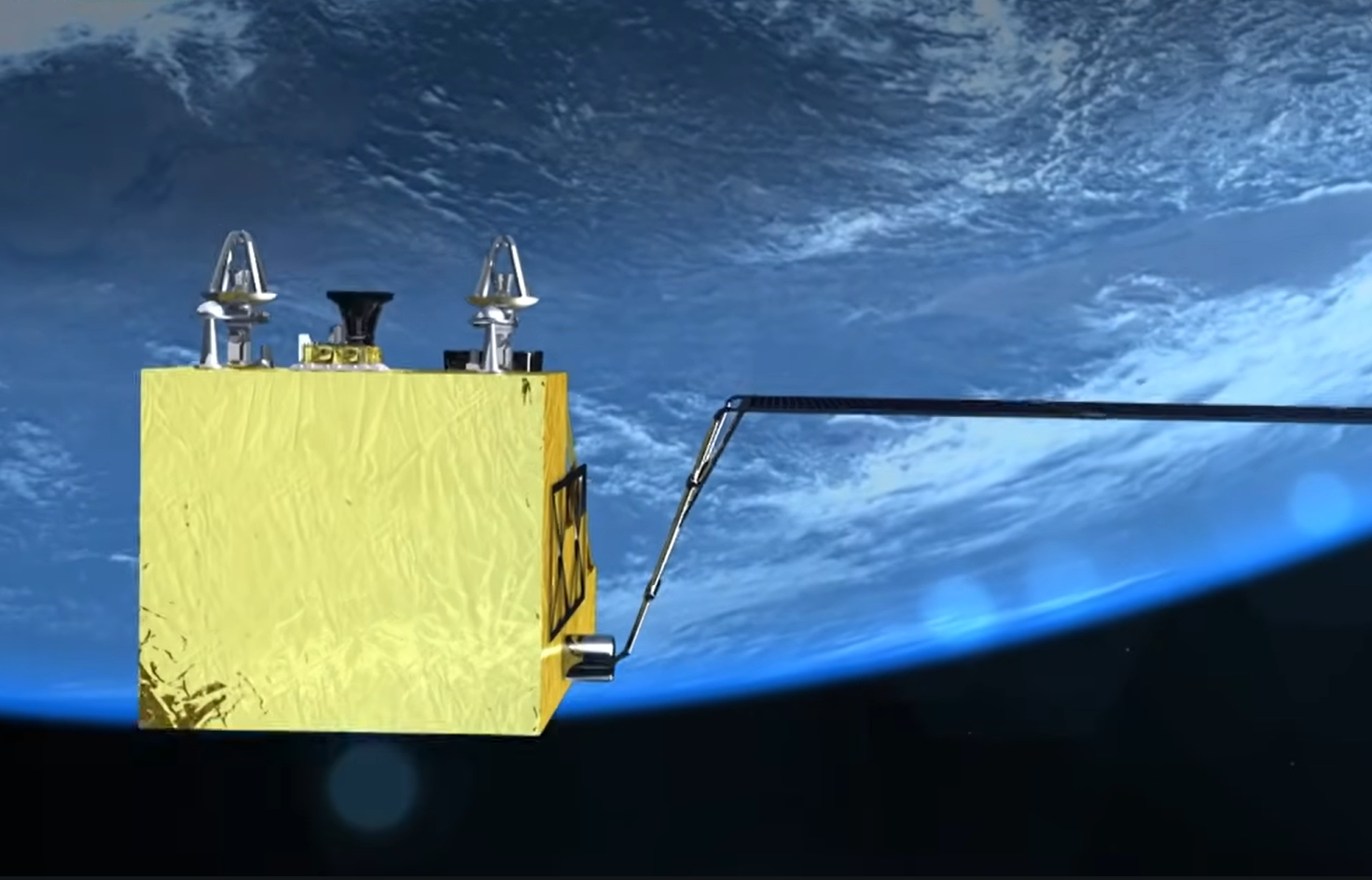
- Artist's rendering of Tianwen-3
- Mission type: Mars sample return
- Operator: CNSA

Spacecraft properties
- Manufacturer: CAST

Start of mission
- Launch date: 2028 (planned)
- Rocket: Orbiter/Earth-returner: Long March 5 Lander/ascent-vehicle: Long March 5
- Launch site: Wenchang

Tianwen-3
- Chinese: 天问三号
- Simplified Chinese: 天问三号
- Traditional Chinese: 天問三號
Transcriptions
Standard Mandarin
- Hanyu Pinyin: TiānWèn Sān Hào
- Yale Romanization: TyānWèn Sān Hàu

Tianwen-3 (Chinese: 天问三号) is an upcoming robotic Mars sample-return mission of the China National Space Administration scheduled to launch in 2028, returning to Earth by 2031.

The primary mission goal is to return around 500g of surface material from Mars back to earth, with scientific goals including the potential for identifying biosignatures indicating life on Mars. The mission profile uses two spacecraft, an orbiter/Earth-returner and a lander/ascent-vehicle, similar to China's lunar sample return missions Chang'e 5 and Chang'e 6. Unlike those missions, the vehicles will use two separate launches to Mars, each aboard a Long March 5 rocket from Wenchang Space Launch Site. It is planned to use the December 2028–January 2029 Mars launch window. If successful, it would be the world's first Mars sample return; the status of the NASA-ESA Mars Sample Return remains unclear. The mission will include planetary protection measures to prevent forward contamination. Early plans also called for a helicopter and crawling robot, which remain unconfirmed.

== Overview ==
The current mission architecture envisions two launches around 2028 by the Long March 5 carrier rocket. One launch will send an orbiter/return-vehicle. A second launch will send a lander/ascent-vehicle.

The main goal of the mission is to collect and return at least 500g of samples from the surface of Mars. Once the lander arrives on the Martian surface it will collect surface samples, via a drill on the lander and possibly an autonomous mobile robot with multiple legs. After several months on the Martian surface and after storing the samples collected by the lander and mobile robot, the ascent vehicle will launch from atop the lander and rendezvous with the waiting orbiter. The ascent vehicle will transfer the collected samples to the orbiter/return-vehicle, which will depart for Earth. The samples will be returned to Earth via an atmospheric reentry vehicle.

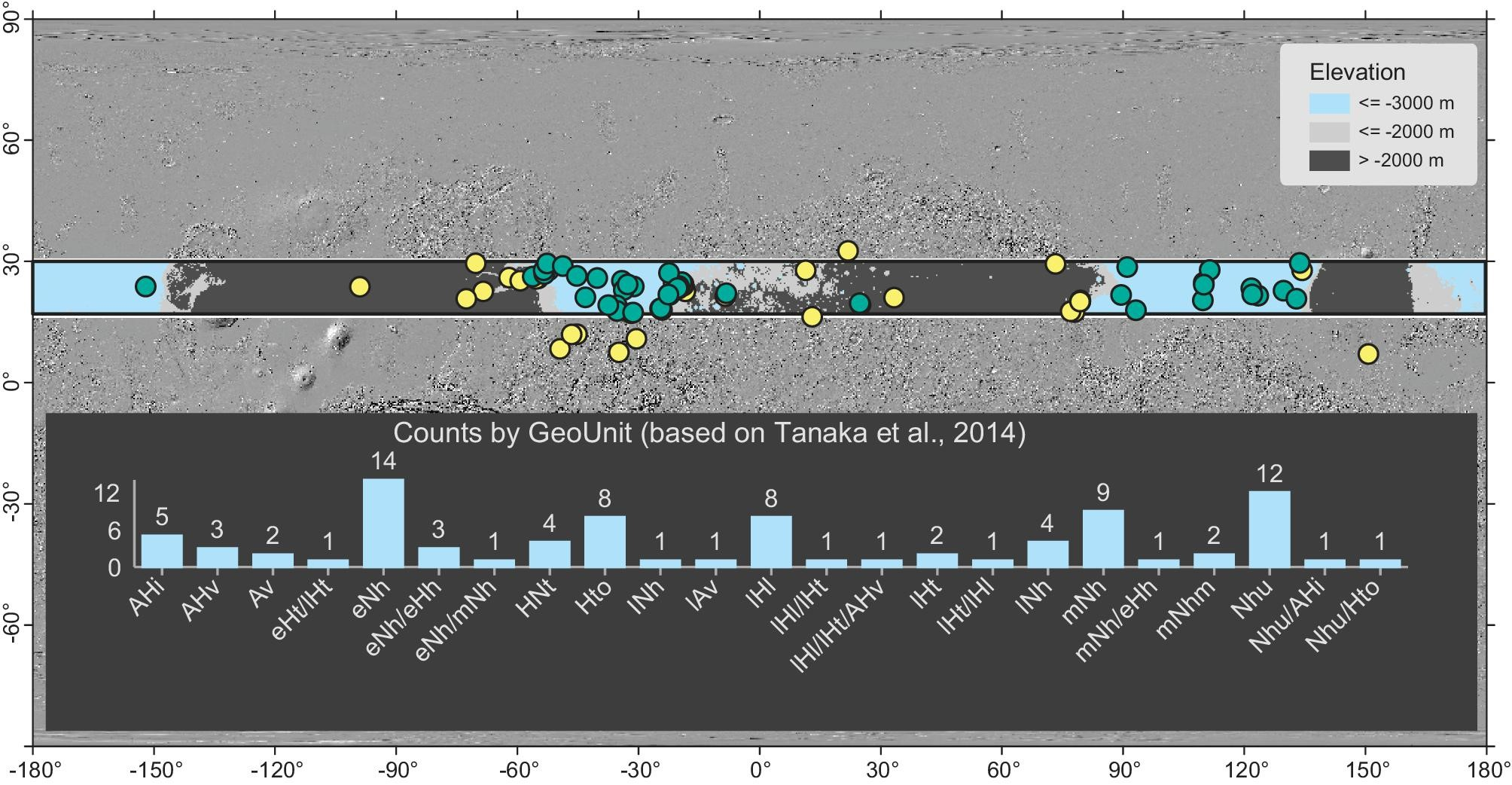
Preliminary landing sites for the Tianwen-3 mission. Green dots are within engineered capability, yellow dots are not but have high scientific value.

Scientific objectives will include the study of the atmosphere of mars, its geology, as well as the potential for biosignatures indicating past life. In 2024, scientists identified 51 potential landing sites in line with the missions current engineering constraints (altitudes less than −3 km, latitudes from 17°N to 30°N, slopes less than 8°, and 'rock abundance' less than 10%): 1 in Amazonis Planitia, 12 in Utopia Planitia, and 38 in Chryse Planitia or Arabia Terra.

== International collaboration ==
On 11 March 2025, CNSA opened the Tianwen-3 Mars sample-return mission to potential international partners. International teams can propose "piggyback payloads requiring support from the Tianwen-3 spacecraft or independent scientific instruments" for inclusion on the spacecraft. 15 kilograms of mass has been allocated on the Tianwen-3 Earth-return spacecraft for potential international scientific payloads and another 5 kilograms are available for partner payloads on the Mars orbiter. Interested parties may submit proposals by 30 June 2025 with a final selection targeted for October 2025. Flight hardware for the selected payloads are to be delivered in 2027.

== History ==
In summer 2022 during a deep space exploration technology forum held at Nanjing University, Sun Zezhou, chief designer of the Tianwen-1 mission, detailed plans for the mission based on a two-launch architecture. The mission constitutes part of the Tianwen series of space missions.

Tianwen-3 will be the third Mars mission of the Chinese space program, after the failed Yinghuo-1 orbiter (2011) and the successful Tianwen-1 orbiter, lander, and rover (2020–present). It is the third mission of the Planetary Exploration of China program, after Tianwen-2, an asteroid and comet mission.
