= Planetary Exploration of China =

Chinese Solar System exploration program

- 中国行星探测; Zhōngguó Xíngxīng Tàncè
- Emblem of Planetary Exploration of China; Reaching for the Planets

Program overview
- Country: China
- Organization: China National Space Administration (CNSA)
- Purpose: Robotic Interplanetary mission
- Status: Ongoing

Program history
- Duration: 2016–present
- First flight: Tianwen-1, July 23, 2020, 04:41 UTC
- Last flight: Tianwen-2, May 28, 2025, 17:31 UTC
- Successes: 2
- Failures: 0
- Launch site(s): Wenchang Spacecraft Launch Site; Xichang Satellite Launch Center

Vehicle information
- Launch vehicle: Long March rockets

The Planetary Exploration of China (PEC; Chinese: 中国行星探测; pinyin: Zhōngguó Xíngxīng Tàncè), is the robotic interplanetary spaceflight program conducted by the China National Space Administration (CNSA) since 2020. The program aims to explore the Solar System, starting from Mars, and will be expanded to Jupiter and more in the future. Initially known as the Mars mission of China and announced under its current name in April 2020, each mission is named Tianwen (Chinese: 天问; pinyin: Tīanwèn; lit. 'Questions to Heaven'). It is one of CNSA's two Solar System exploration programs, alongside the Chinese Lunar Exploration Program.

Tianwen-1, a Mars mission, launched in July 2020, consisting of an orbiter, a lander, and the Zhurong rover, entering Mars orbit in February 2021, and successfully landing in May, making China the second country to successfully soft-land and operate a spacecraft on Mars, (Note: The Soviet probe Mars 3 successfully landed softly in 1971, but failed before sending clear images.) after the United States. The orbiter remains active as of 2026, while Zhurong has been offline since May 2022. Tianwen-2 was launched in May 2025, to rendezvous with near-Earth asteroid 469219 Kamoʻoalewa in June 2026, return a sample to Earth in 2027, and orbit the comet 311P/PanSTARRS in 2035.

Tianwen-3 is scheduled to achieve the world's first Mars sample-return, launching in 2028 and returning in 2031, using a similar architecture to lunar sample return missions Chang'e 5 and Chang'e 6. Tianwen-4 is planned as a Jupiter mission, orbiting Callisto and possibly including a Uranus flyby probe. It is planned to launch in 2029, using a Venus flyby and two Earth flybys, and arriving in 2035.

The Mars and Jupiter missions of the program use the Long March 5 heavy-lift rocket via Wenchang Space Launch Site, while Tianwen-2 used a Long March 3B via Xichang Satellite Launch Center. Prior to 2020, CNSA had attempted interplanetary exploration with the 2011 Yinghuo-1 orbiter carried by Russia's failed Fobos-Grunt probe, and the 2012 successful flyby by lunar probe Chang'e 2 of asteroid 4179 Toutatis. Mission communications use the Chinese Deep Space Network, and have previously cooperated with the European Space Agency, using its ESTRACK network and Mars Express orbiter.

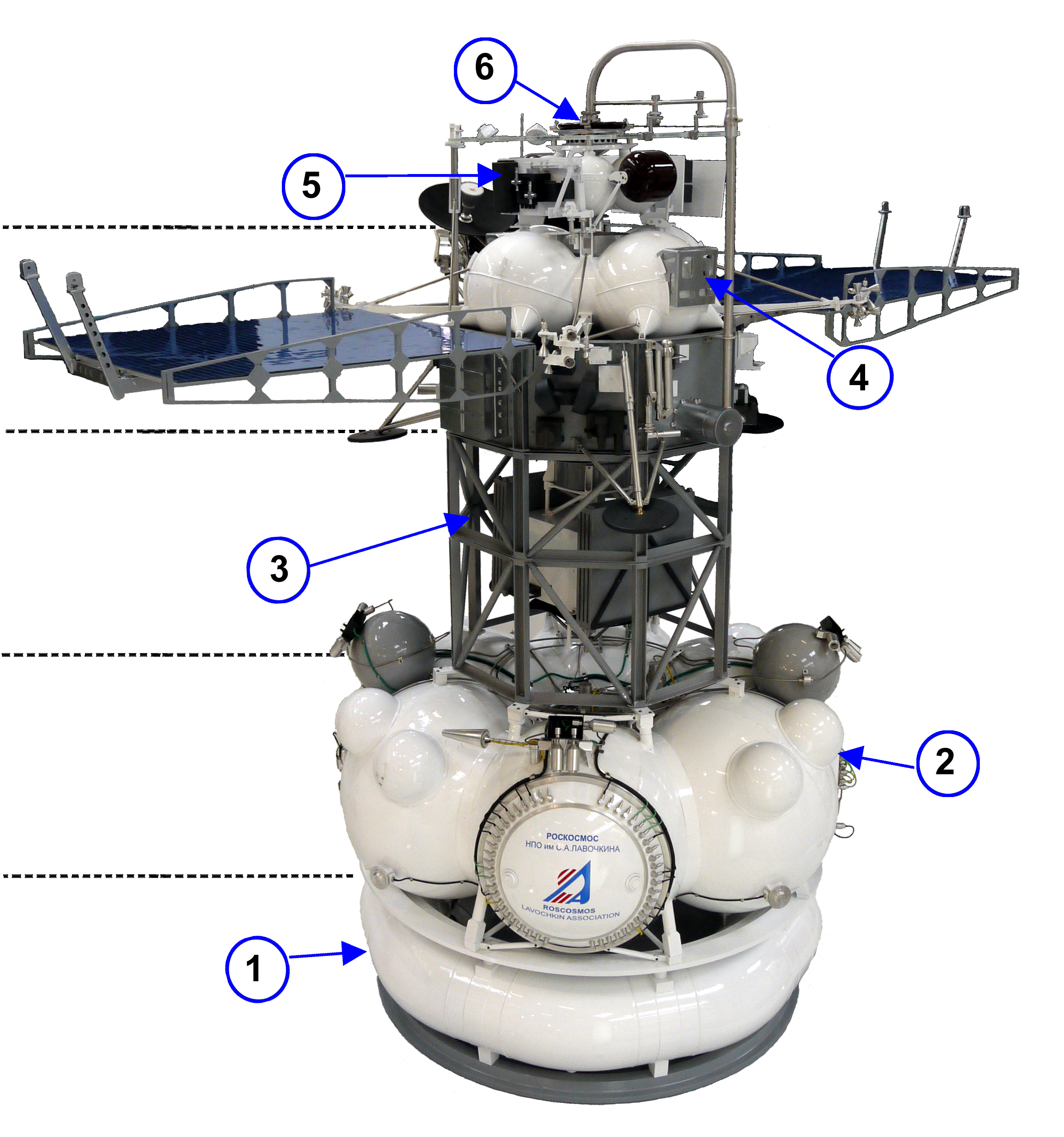
Model of Fobos-Grunt presented at the Paris Air Show in 2011. The Chinese satellite Yinghuo-1 is in the center, marked with the label 3.

== History ==
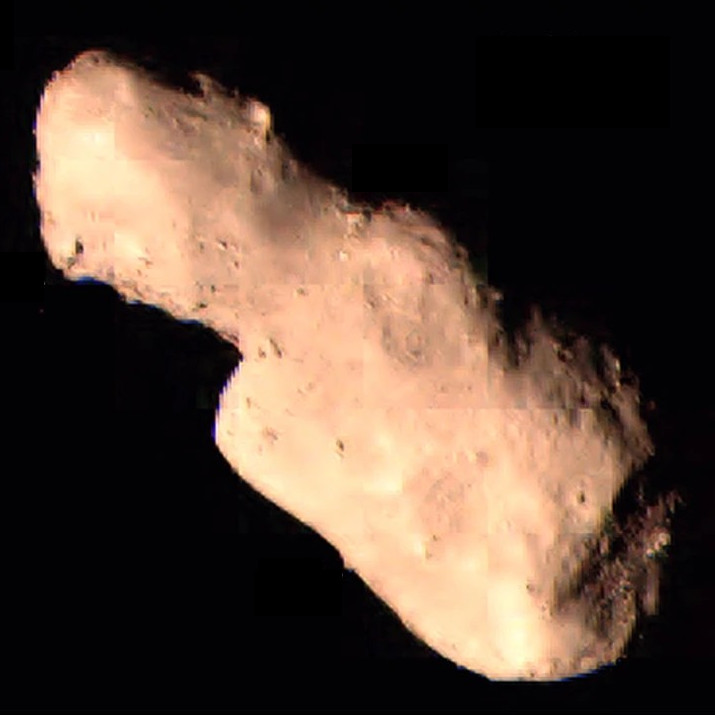
4179 Toutatis asteroid captured by Chang'e 2

China began its first interplanetary exploration attempt in 2011 by sending Yinghuo-1, a Mars orbiter, in a joint mission with Russia. Yet it failed to leave Earth orbit due to the failure of Russian launch vehicle.

On December 13, 2012, the Chinese lunar probe Chang'e 2 made a flyby of the asteroid 4179 Toutatis in an extended mission. With a distance of over 7 million kilometers away from Earth, Chang'e 2 became China's first interplanetary probe which tested the limit of China's deep space communication capability.

On April 22, 2016, Xu Dazhe, head of the CNSA, announced that the Mars mission had been approved on January 11, 2016. A probe would be sent to Martian orbit and attempt to land on Mars in 2020.

On November 14, 2019, CNSA invited some foreign embassies and international organizations to witness hovering and obstacle avoidance test for Mars Lander of China's first Mars exploration mission at the extraterrestrial celestial landing test site. It was the first public appearance of China's Mars exploration mission.

On April 24, 2020, Planetary Exploration of China was formally announced by CNSA, along with the name "Tianwen" and emblem of the program. The first mission of the program, the Mars mission to be carried out in 2020, was named Tianwen-1.

The first mission of the program, Tianwen-1 Mars exploration mission, was launched on July 23, 2020. The Tianwen-1 was inserted into Mars orbit in February 2021 after a seven-month journey, followed by a successful soft landing of the lander and Zhurong rover on May 14, 2021. The Zhurong rover was deployed onto the Martian surface from its landing platform and began its exploratory mission on May 22. On June 1, CNSA released multiple high-resolution images taken on Martian surface, confirming the success of the mission.

On June 12, 2021, CNSA announced the future plans for near-Earth asteroid sample return, Mars sample return and Jupiter system exploration.

== Name and emblem ==
The program's name "Tianwen", which literally means "questions to heaven", derived from the eponymous poem by the famous ancient poet Qu Yuan of the state of Chu during the Warring States period (475–221 BC). The name is said to represent the Chinese people's relentless pursuit of truth, the country's cultural inheritance of its understanding of nature and universe, as well as the unending explorations in science and technology.

The emblem of PEC and its missions consist of eight planets in the Solar System and their orbits in the shape of the Latin letter 'c', referring to China, cooperation, and the cosmic velocity required to undertake planetary exploration.

== Launch facilities ==
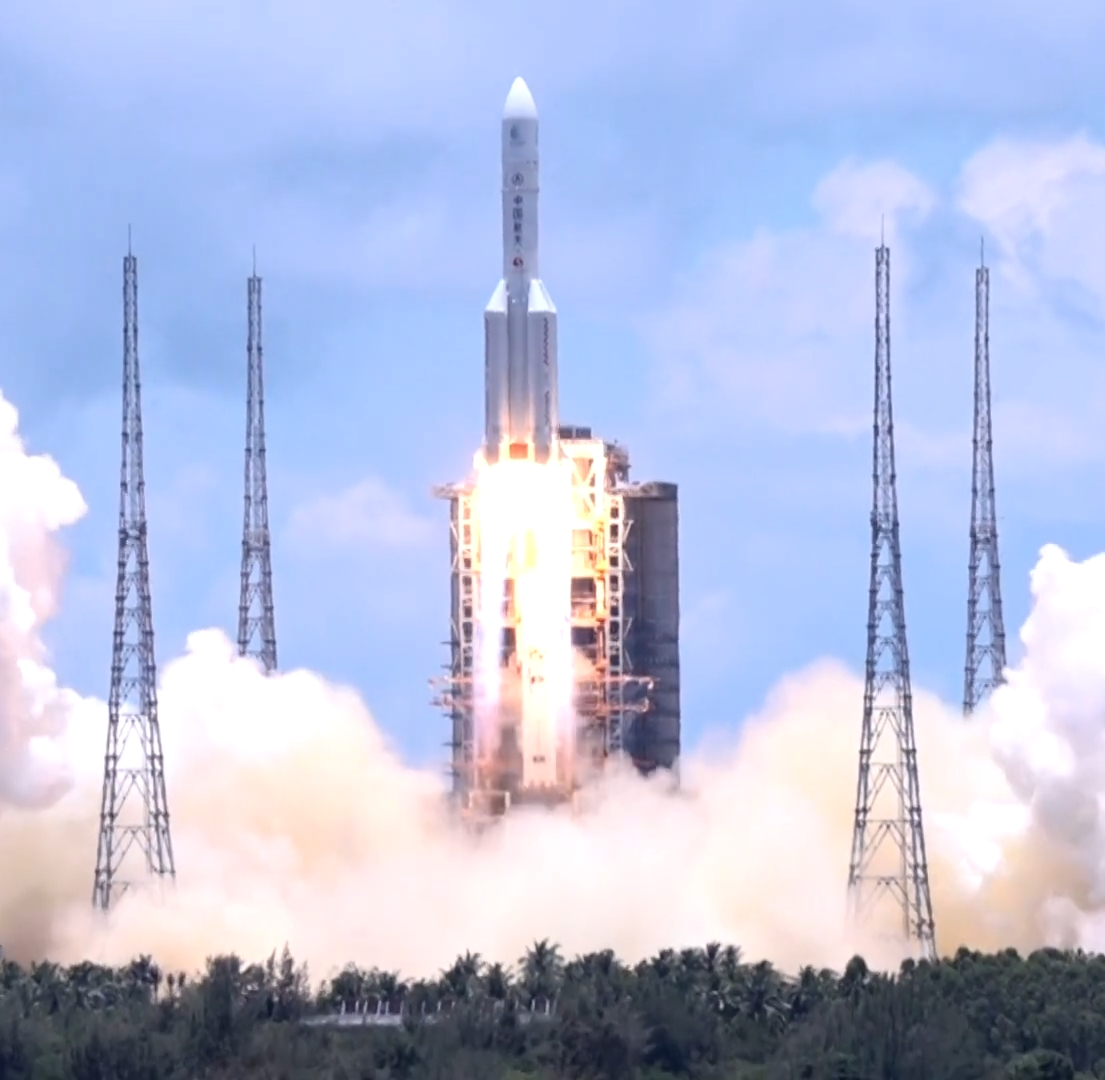
Launch of Tianwen-1 from Wenchang on July 23, 2020

=== Wenchang Spacecraft Launch Site ===
Wenchang Spacecraft Launch Site is China's newest space vehicle launch facility. It is the only launch site in China capable of launching China's most powerful rocket Long March 5, which offers the maximum payload capacity into deep space.

Tianwen-1, the first mission of PEC, was launched from Wenchang.

=== Xichang Satellite Launch Center ===
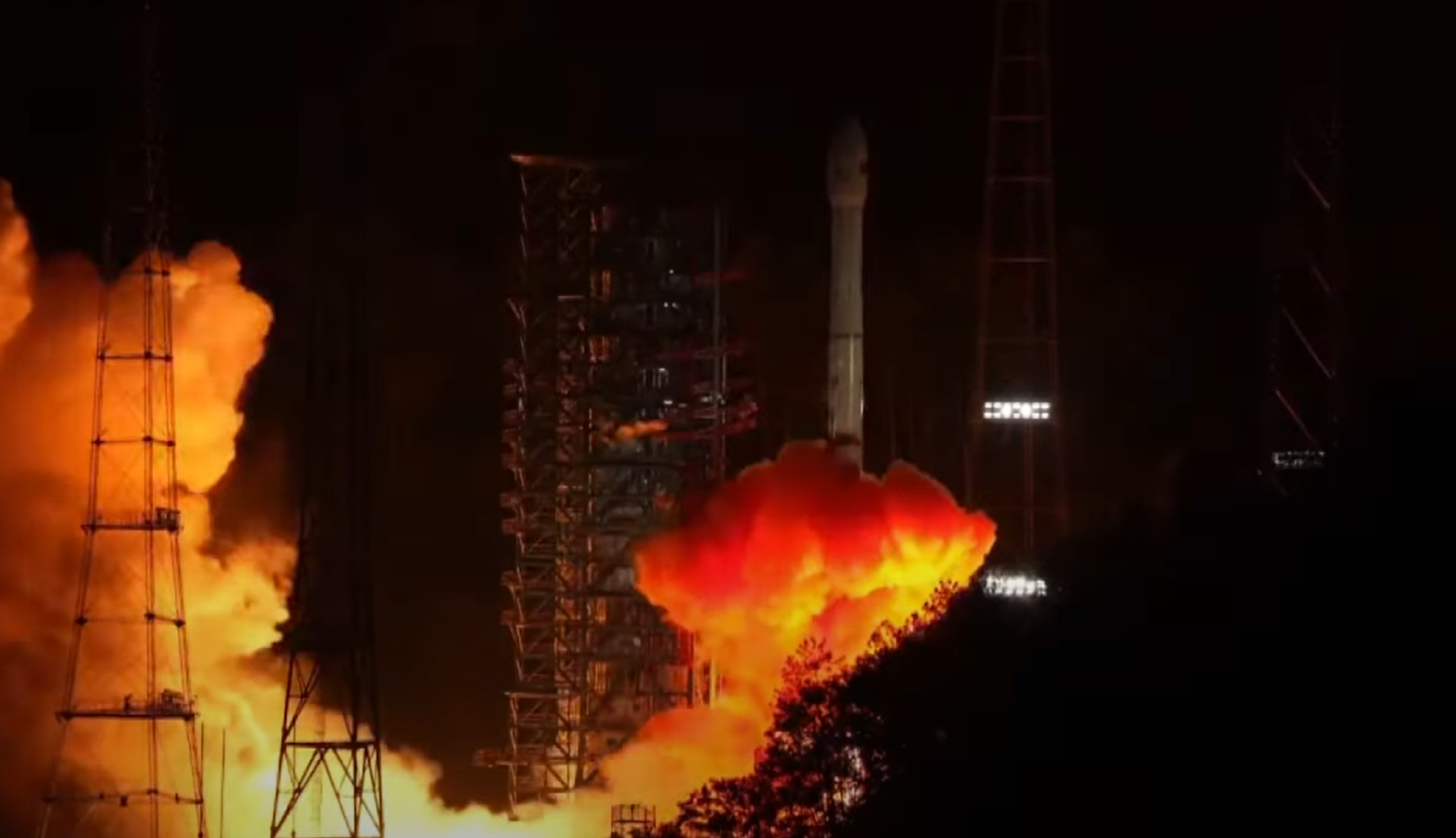
Launch of Tianwen-2 from Xichang on May 28, 2025.

Tianwen-2, the second mission of PEC, was launched from Xichang aboard a Long March 3B rocket.

== Supporting facilities ==
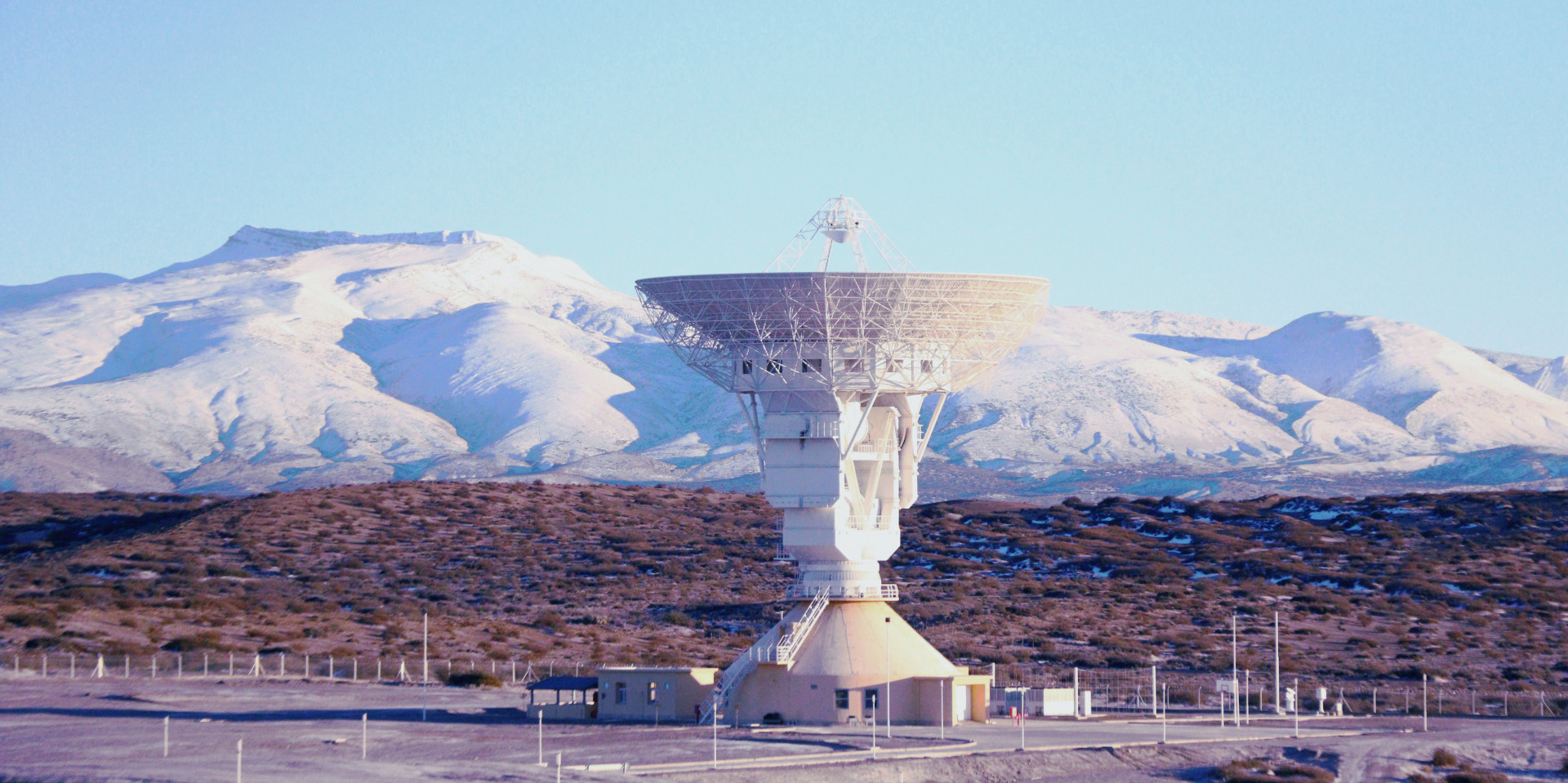
Neuquén ground station of the Chinese Deep Space Network

=== Monitoring and control center ===
- Beijing Aerospace Flight Control Center is the center which is responsible for command and decision making, control and computing, data processing, information exchange, and spacecraft management.

=== Chinese deep space network ===
The Chinese Deep Space Network provides tracking, telemetry and command (TT&C) capability to the interplanetary spaceflights. Participating facilities include:

- Xi'an Satellite Control Center is the facility that manages and operates the Chinese Deep Space Network.
- Jiamusi ground station with one 66-meter antenna located in Jiamusi, Heilongjiang, the easternmost of China, operational since 2012.
- Kashgar ground station with four 35-meter antenna array located in Kashgar, Xinjiang, the westernmost of China, operational since 2012 and upgraded in 2020.
- Neuquén ground station with one 35-meter antenna located in Neuquén, Argentina, operational since 2017.

=== Extraterrestrial celestial landing test site ===
Located in Huailai County, Hebei, the extraterrestrial celestial landing test site is the largest facility of this kind in Asia.

The facility consists of six 140-meter tall cranes and one central platform, which is connected with the cranes by 36 cables. The movement of the platform provides simulation of the Mars gravity environment to the lander hung below it. The ground of is paved with special material, which can be manipulated to form pits or slopes.

The extraterrestrial celestial landing test site is used to test the lander's capability of hovering, obstacle avoidance and slowing down.

== Current and future missions ==
=== Tianwen-1 ===
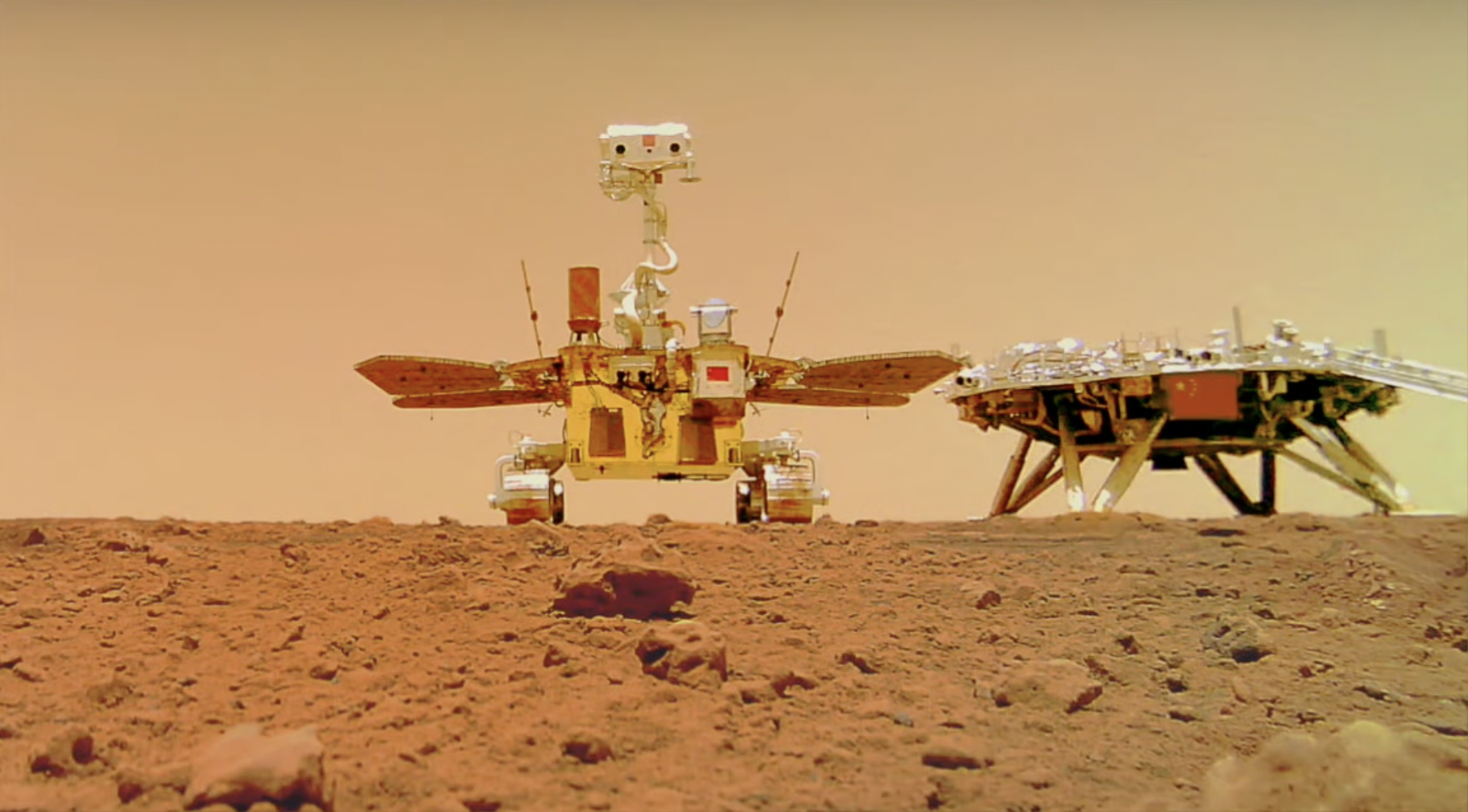
Zhurong selfie with lander, taken by the deployable Tianwen-1 Remote Camera

As China's first independent Mars exploration mission, Tianwen-1 set out to accomplish three major goals simultaneously: orbiting, landing on, and roving Mars via a single set of spacecraft. On July 23, 2020, the Tianwen-1 spacecraft stack, consisting of an orbiter, a lander, a rover, deployable and remote cameras launched from Wenchang, marking the beginning of the mission.

After a 202-day journey through interplanetary space, Tianwen-1 inserted itself into Martian orbit on February 10, 2021, thereby becoming China's first Mars orbiter. During this long journey, it deployed a deployable camera in September 2020 whose imagery confirmed the successful launch and Mars transit phase of the spacecraft. Subsequently, it performed several orbital maneuvers and began surveying target landing sites on Mars in preparation for the coming landing attempt.

On May 14, 2021, the lander and the Zhurong rover separated from Tianwen-1's orbiter. After experiencing Mars atmospheric entry that lasted about nine minutes, the lander and rover made a successful soft landing in the Utopia Planitia region of Mars. With the landing, China became the second country to operate a fully functional spacecraft on Martian surface, after the United States.

On May 22, 2021, the Zhurong rover deployed onto the Martian surface from its landing platform and began its exploratory mission. During its deployment, the Rover's instrument, Mars Climatic Station (MCS), recorded the sound, acting as the second Martian sound instrument to record Martian sounds successfully after Mars 2020 Perseverance rover's microphones. During this journey it deployed the remote selfie camera on June 1, 2021, whose imagery confirmed the successful landing of the rover and lander. Later on, the orbiter released another deployable camera in Mars Orbit on December 31, 2021 who imaged the orbiter and Utopia Planitia where Zhurong rover is operating and an unknown selfie stick payload was deployed to working position on orbiter to image orbiter's key components and Chinese flag on orbiter on January 30, 2022, for Chinese New Year.

=== Tianwen-2 ===
The mission to return samples from a near-Earth asteroid and to orbit a main-belt comet is planned to be conducted around 2025, according to CNSA announcement on June 12, 2021.

On May 28, 2025, the Tianwen-2 spacecraft, consisting of an orbiter, a return module, deployable and remote cameras launched from Xichang, marking the beginning of the first asteroid exploration mission of China.

=== Mars sample-return mission (planned) ===
In December 2020, the CNSA announced plans for a Mars sample-return mission to be carried out later in the decade. In a June 2022 announcement, the mission's name was revealed to be Tianwen-3 and further details were announced, including a 2028 launch date for a 2031 return to Earth. One spacecraft would land on the martian surface to collect samples and send the material back to Martian orbit. A second spacecraft would take the samples which would then be carried by a return capsule back to earth.

=== Venus exploration mission (planned) ===
In 2022, the CNSA revealed VOICE (Venus Volcano Imaging and Climate Explorer), an orbiter mission to launch in 2026 and arrive at Venus in 2027. This mission is expected to last 3-4 years and include the following payloads, a Microwave Radiometric Sounder (MRS), Polarimetric Synthetic Aperture Radar (PolSAR), and Ultraviolet-Visible-Near Infrared Multispectral Imager (UVN-MSI). VOICE would return images of the surface with one-meter resolution and search the clouds for habitability and biosignatures.

According to the National Space Science Medium- and Long-Term Development Plan (2024-2050), the mission was not selected for development. It was replaced by a Venus atmosphere sample return mission, but no details or timelines were announced. In 2024, China's Deep Space Exploration Lab displayed a development roadmap envisioning a spaceplane-type craft for a Venus atmosphere sample return launching in 2033.

=== Jupiter system exploration mission (planned) ===
China is planning a mission to Jupiter and possibly to the Jovian moon Callisto. One of two possible mission architectures ("Jupiter Callisto Orbiter" and "Jupiter System Observer") will likely be launched in 2029 and arrive at the Jovian system in 2035, after one Venus flyby and two Earth flybys. The mission will also include an additional probe that will conduct a flyby of Uranus sometime after 2040.

== List of missions ==
Mission	Launch date (UTC)	Launch site	Launch vehicle	Spacecraft	Orbital insertion date (UTC)	Landing date (UTC)	Landing location	Operational time	Status	Notes
Tianwen-1	July 23, 2020; 04:41:15	Wenchang	Long March 5	Tianwen-1 orbiter	February 10, 2021; 11:52	–	–	2059 days	Operational	
Tianwen-1	July 23, 2020; 04:41:15	Wenchang	Long March 5	Tianwen-1 lander	February 10, 2021; 11:52	May 14, 2021; 23:18	Utopia Planitia; 25.1°N 109.9°E	3 hours	Success	No payload except a black box was on the lander. Reached end of designed lifespan after landing.
Tianwen-1	July 23, 2020; 04:41:15	Wenchang	Long March 5	Zhurong rover	February 10, 2021; 11:52	May 14, 2021; 23:18	Utopia Planitia; 25.1°N 109.9°E	358 days	Success	Deployed onto the Martian surface on May 22, 2021. Stopped communicating on 20 May 2022 after entering winter hibernation.
Tianwen-2	May 28, 2025; 17:31	Xichang	Long March 3B	Tianwen-2 orbiter (469219 Kamoʻoalewa phase)	June 7, 2026 (planned)	July 3, 2026 (planned in-situ sample acquisition)	TBD	491 days	Operational	
Tianwen-2	May 28, 2025; 17:31	Xichang	Long March 3B	Tianwen-2 sample-return capsule	–	November 29, 2027 (planned)	Inner Mongolia, Earth	491 days	Operational	mission plan envisions the capsule to return a sample of up to 100 g (3.5 oz) of regolith.
Tianwen-2	May 28, 2025; 17:31	Xichang	Long March 3B	Tianwen-2 orbiter (311P/PanSTARRS phase)	January 24, 2035 (planned)	–	–	491 days	Operational	mission plan envisions the orbital exploration of 311P/PanSTARRS with the duration of about four-months.
Tianwen-3	December 2028–January 2029	Wenchang	Long March 5	Tianwen-3 orbiter/Earth returner	Q3 2029	–	TBD, Earth	–	Planned	
Tianwen-3	December 2028–January 2029	Wenchang	Long March 5	Tianwen-3 lander/ascent vehicle	Q3 2029	Q3 2029	TBD, Mars	–	Planned	

== Timeline ==
The image above contains clickable links

Timeline of the Tianwen missions.

== See also ==
- Chinese space program
  - Chinese Lunar Exploration Program
  - Chinese Deep Space Network
- Interplanetary spaceflight
  - List of interplanetary voyages
- Exploration of Mars
  - List of missions to Mars
