= Long March 5 =

Chinese heavy lift rocket

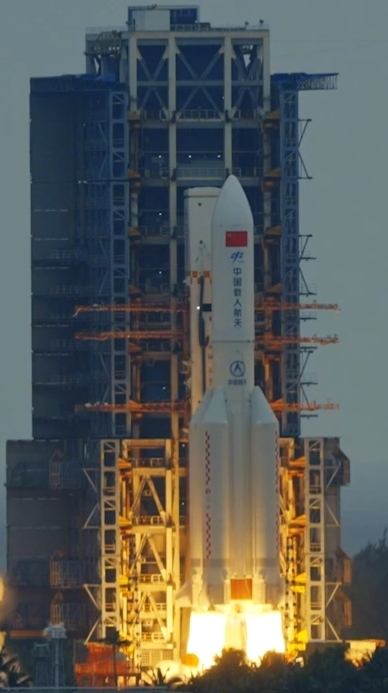
- A Long March 5B launches the Tianhe core module of Tiangong space station, Wenchang Space Launch Site, 2021
- Function: Heavy-lift launch vehicle
- Manufacturer: CALT
- Country of origin: China
- Cost per launch: ~US$160 million

Size
- Height: 56.97 m (186.9 ft) (standard); 63.2 m (207 ft) (extended fairing)
- Diameter: 5 m (16 ft)
- Mass: 851,800 kg (1,877,900 lb)
- Stages: 2

Payload to LEO
- Altitude: 200 km × 400 km (120 mi × 250 mi)
- Mass: 25,000 kg (55,000 lb)

Payload to GTO
- Mass: 14,000 kg (31,000 lb)

Payload to TLI
- Mass: 8,800–9,400 kg (19,400–20,700 lb)

Payload to GEO
- Mass: 5,100 kg (11,200 lb)

Payload to SSO
- Altitude: 700 km (430 mi)
- Mass: 15,000 kg (33,000 lb)

Payload to SSO
- Altitude: 2,000 km (1,200 mi)
- Mass: 6,700 kg (14,800 lb)

Payload to MEO
- Mass: 13,000 kg (29,000 lb)

Payload to TMI
- Mass: 6,000 kg (13,000 lb)

Associated rockets
- Family: Long March
- Comparable: Delta IV; Falcon 9; Proton-M; Angara A5; Ariane 64

Launch history
- Status: Active
- Launch sites: Wenchang, LC-1
- Total launches: 18: CZ-5: 11; CZ-5B: 7
- Success(es): 17: CZ-5: 10; CZ-5B: 7
- Failure: 1 (CZ-5)
- First flight: CZ-5: 3 November 2016; CZ-5B: 5 May 2020
- Last flight: CZ-5: 11 June 2026 (most recent); CZ-5B: 13 August 2025 (most recent)
- Carries passengers or cargo: Mengzhou; Chang'e Project; Tiangong modules; Hulianwang

Boosters – CZ-5-300
- No. boosters: 4
- Height: 27.6 m (91 ft)
- Diameter: 3.35 m (11.0 ft)
- Empty mass: 13,800 kg (30,400 lb)
- Gross mass: 156,600 kg (345,200 lb)
- Powered by: 2 × YF-100
- Maximum thrust: Sea level: 2,400 kN (540,000 lb_{f}); Vacuum: 2,680 kN (600,000 lb_{f})
- Total thrust: 9,600 kN (2,200,000 lb_{f})
- Specific impulse: Sea level: 300 s (2.9 km/s); Vacuum: 335.1 s (3.286 km/s)
- Burn time: 173 seconds
- Propellant: LOX / RP-1

First stage – CZ-5-500
- Height: 33.16 m (108.8 ft)
- Diameter: 5 m (16 ft)
- Gross mass: 186,900 kg (412,000 lb)
- Propellant mass: 165,300 kg (364,400 lb)
- Powered by: 2 × YF-77
- Maximum thrust: Sea level: 1,036 kN (233,000 lb_{f}); Vacuum: 1,400 kN (310,000 lb_{f})
- Specific impulse: Sea level: 316.7 s (3.106 km/s); Vacuum: 428 s (4.20 km/s)
- Burn time: 492 seconds
- Propellant: LOX / LH_{2}

Second stage (CZ-5) – CZ-5-HO
- Height: 11.54 m (37.9 ft)
- Diameter: 5 m (16 ft)
- Empty mass: 5,100 kg (11,200 lb)
- Gross mass: 36,000 kg (79,000 lb)
- Propellant mass: 29,100 kg (64,200 lb)
- Powered by: 2 × YF-75D
- Maximum thrust: 176.72 kN (39,730 lb_{f})
- Specific impulse: 442.6 s (4.340 km/s)
- Burn time: 700 seconds
- Propellant: LOX / LH_{2}

Third stage – YZ-2 (Optional)
- Diameter: 3.8 m (12 ft)
- Powered by: 2 × YF-50D
- Maximum thrust: 13 kN (2,900 lb_{f})
- Total thrust: 13 kN (2,900 lb_{f})
- Specific impulse: 316 s (3.10 km/s)
- Burn time: 1,105 seconds
- Propellant: N_{2}O_{4} / UDMH

Long March 5 (LM-5; Chinese: 长征五号; pinyin: Chángzhēng wǔ hào) or Changzheng 5 (CZ-5), also known by its nickname "Pang-Wu" (胖五, "Fat-Five"), is a Chinese heavy-lift launch vehicle developed by the China Academy of Launch Vehicle Technology (CALT). The most powerful Chinese rocket and Long March rocket ever built, it is also the most powerful orbital launch vehicle operating outside of the United States. First launched in 2016, CZ-5 has carried cornerstones of the Chinese space program: all three modules of the Tiangong space station, two Moon sample returns, and one Mars mission.

There are two CZ-5 variants: CZ-5 and CZ-5B. The maximum payload capacities are approximately 25,000 kg (55,000 lb) to low Earth orbit (for CZ-5B) and approximately 14,000 kg (31,000 lb) to geostationary transfer orbit (for CZ-5). This makes the CZ-5B the world's fifth most powerful orbital launch vehicle by payload to LEO and the CZ-5 the second most powerful by payload to GTO, comparable to the US Vulcan Centaur, ESA Ariane 6, and Russian Angara A5. The hydrolox core stage uses two YF-77 engines, while its four kerolox boosters each use two YF-100 engines, ultimately derived from the Soviet RD-120. The hydrolox second stage uses two YF-75D engines. The Yuanzheng-2 third stage, only used on the CZ-5 variant, is powered by two hypergolic YF-50D engines.

As of April 2026, Long March 5 variants have launched 17 times, with 16 successes, all from the southernmost Wenchang Space Launch Site. Ten have been on the CZ-5 and seven on the CZ-5B. The first CZ-5 launched on in November 2016. Following a core stage failure on its second launch in June 2017, it underwent a 28-month launch hiatus, before resuming successful flights. The CZ-5B first launched in 2020.

The CZ-5 has launched large space probes: the Tianwen-1, China's first Mars orbiter, lander, and rover, as well as Chang'e 5 and Chang'e 6, China's first Moon sample return missions. CZ-5 has also launched military satellites of the geostationary Shijian and Tongxin Jishu Shiyan programs, and low Earth Yaogan program. The CZ-5B variant, lacking the Yuanzheng-2 upper stage, has launched larger low Earth orbit payloads: all modules of Tiangong: Tianhe, Wentian, and Mengtian, in 2021 and 2022, an uncrewed prototype of the Mengzhou lunar crew module, in 2020, and 10-satellite polar orbit clusters of the Guowang satellite internet constellation, since 2024.

The CZ-5 is planned to launch the 2026 Chang'e 7 and 2029 Chang'e 8 Moon missions carrying orbiters, landers, and rovers, the 2028 dual-launch Tianwen-3 Mars sample return and 2029 Tianwen-4 Jupiter orbiter and Uranus flyby mission, and potentially the Shensuo heliosphere probes. The CZ-5B is expected to launch the Xuntian space telescope to co-orbit with Tiangong in late 2026.

== History ==
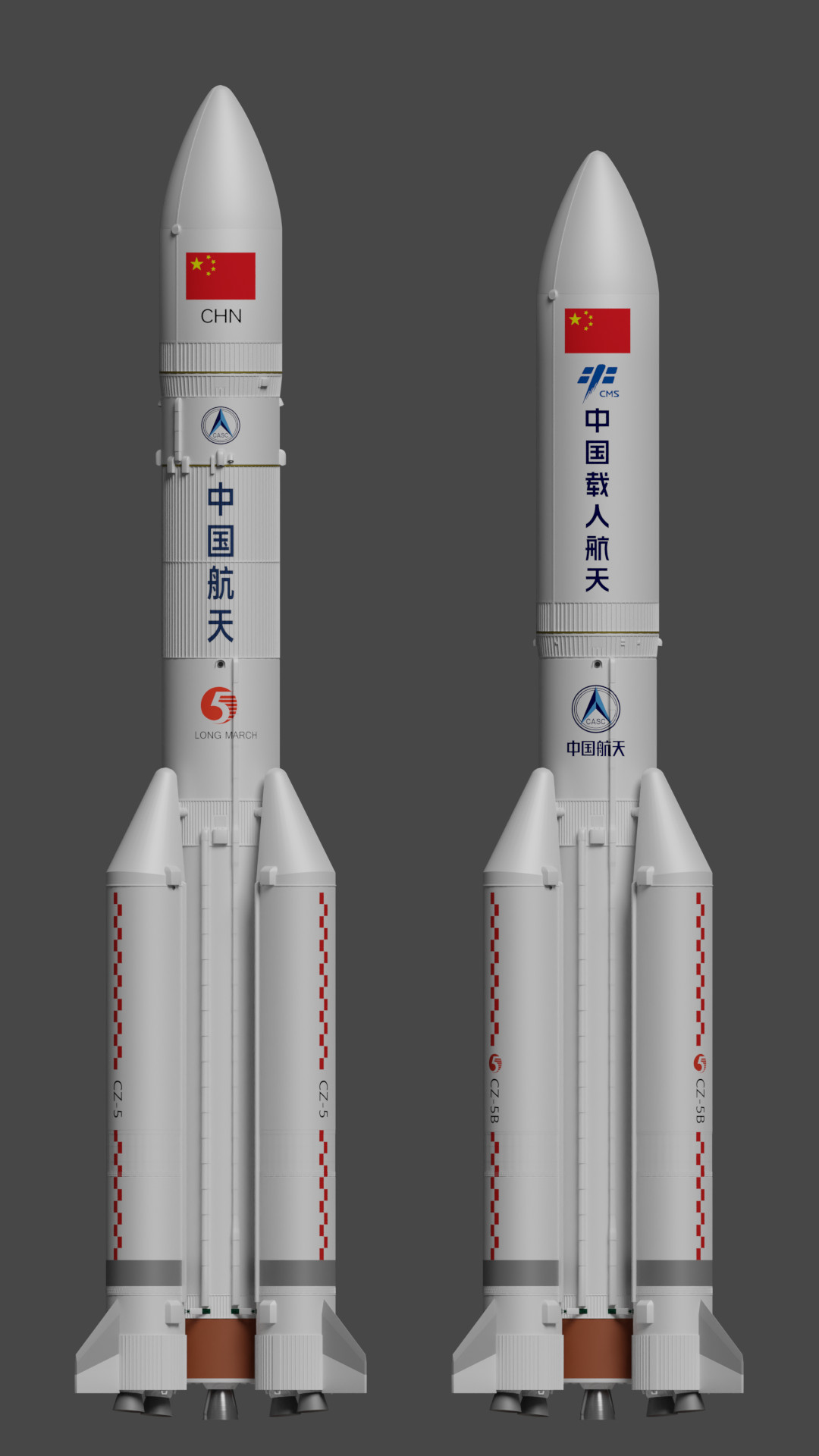
Rendering of Long March 5 and 5B

=== Proposal and development ===
Since 2010, Long March launches (all versions) have made up 15–25% of the global launch totals. Growing domestic demand for launch services has also allowed China's state launch provider to maintain a healthy manifest. Additionally, China had been able to secure some international launch contracts by offering package deals that bundle launch vehicles with Chinese satellites, thereby circumventing the effects of U.S. embargo.

China's main objective for initiating the new CZ-5 program in 2007 was in anticipation of its future requirement for larger LEO and GTO payload capacities during the next 20–30 years period. Formal approval of the Long March 5 program occurred in 2007 following two decades of feasibility studies when funding was finally granted by the Chinese government. At the time, the new rocket was expected to be manufactured at a facility in Tianjin, a coastal city near Beijing, while launch was expected to occur at the new Wenchang Space Launch Site in the southernmost island province of Hainan.

In July 2012, a new 1200 kN thrust LOX/kerosene engine to be used on the Long March 5 boosters was test-fired by China.

The first photos of a CZ-5, undergoing tests, were released in March 2015.

The first production CZ-5 was shipped from the port of Tianjin in North China to Wenchang Space Launch Site on Hainan Island on 20 September 2015 for launch rehearsals.

The maiden flight of the CZ-5 was initially scheduled for 2014, but this subsequently slipped to 2016.

The final production and testing of the first CZ-5 rocket to be launched into orbit were completed at its Tianjin manufacturing facility on or about 16 August 2016 and the various segments of the rocket were shipped to the launch center on Hainan island shortly thereafter.

=== Early flights ===
The launch was planned to take place at around 10:00 UTC on 3 November 2016, but several issues, involving an oxygen vent and chilling of the engines, were detected during the preparation, causing a delay of nearly three hours. The final countdown was interrupted three times due to problems with the flight control computer and the tracking software. The rocket finally launched at 12:43 UTC.

The second launch on 2 July 2017 experienced an anomaly shortly after launch and was switched to an alternate, gentler trajectory. However, it was declared a failure 45 minutes into the flight. Investigations revealed the source of the second flight's failure to be located in one of the core stage's YF-77 engines (specifically, in the oxidizer's turbo-pump).

The Y3 mission of the Long March 5 program was launched on 27 December 2019, at about 12:45 UTC from the Wenchang Space Launch Site in Hainan, China. CASC declared the mission a success within an hour of launch, after the Shijian-20 communications satellite was placed in geostationary transfer orbit, thus marking the Long March 5 program's return to flight.

=== Introduction of Long March 5B ===
The fourth flight of the Long March 5 program also marked the debut of the CZ-5B variant. This variant retains the base Long March 5's core stage and its four strap-on boosters; however, the CZ-5's second stage (with 2 YF-75D engines) has been removed from the CZ-5B. This variant is used to launch heavy low Earth orbit payloads such as components of the Tiangong space station. The 5B variant may also be considered for launching satellite constellations in the future using the Yuanzheng upper stage.

The first flight of the 5B variant ("Y1 mission", zh:长征五号B首飞) carried an uncrewed prototype of China's future deep space crewed spacecraft, and, as a secondary payload, the Flexible Inflatable Cargo Re-entry Vehicle. The Y1 mission was launched on 5 May 2020, at 10:00 UTC from the Wenchang Space Launch Site in Hainan Island. CASC declared the launch a success after the payloads were placed in low Earth orbit.

The flight's secondary payload, the experimental cargo return craft, malfunctioned during its return to Earth on 6 May 2020. Nevertheless, the return capsule of the prototype next-generation crewed spacecraft, the flight's primary payload, successfully landed in north China's Inner Mongolia Autonomous Region at 05:49 UTC, on 8 May 2020. The prototype spacecraft flew in orbit for two days and 19 hours and carried out a series of successful experiments and technological verifications. The Y1 mission's core stage may have been the most massive object to make an uncontrolled re-entry since the Soviet Union's Salyut 7 space station in 1991 and the United States' Skylab in 1979, excluding the failed controlled reentry of Space Shuttle Columbia over populated areas of the Continental United States in 2003. (Note: A piece of debris up to 12-meters long, possibly originating from the reentry of the CZ-5B core stage from this launch, was found in the Ivory Coast's village of Mahounou on about 11 or 12 May 2020.) (Note: The core stage of the CZ-5B Y2 mission also attained enough velocity to remain in low but declining Earth orbit for over a week, as did the core stage for the CZ-5B Y1 mission; the CZ-5B Y2 mission's core stage eventually reentered Earth's atmosphere many kilometers above the Arabian Peninsula during the early morning hours of 9 May 2021 (UTC) with a possible debris impact location off the Maldives in the Indian Ocean.)

=== Space station construction ===
Long March 5B was the workhorse during the Tiangong space station construction. The second Long March 5B mission was the launch of Tianhe core module, the first component of the Chinese space station.

== Design and specifications ==
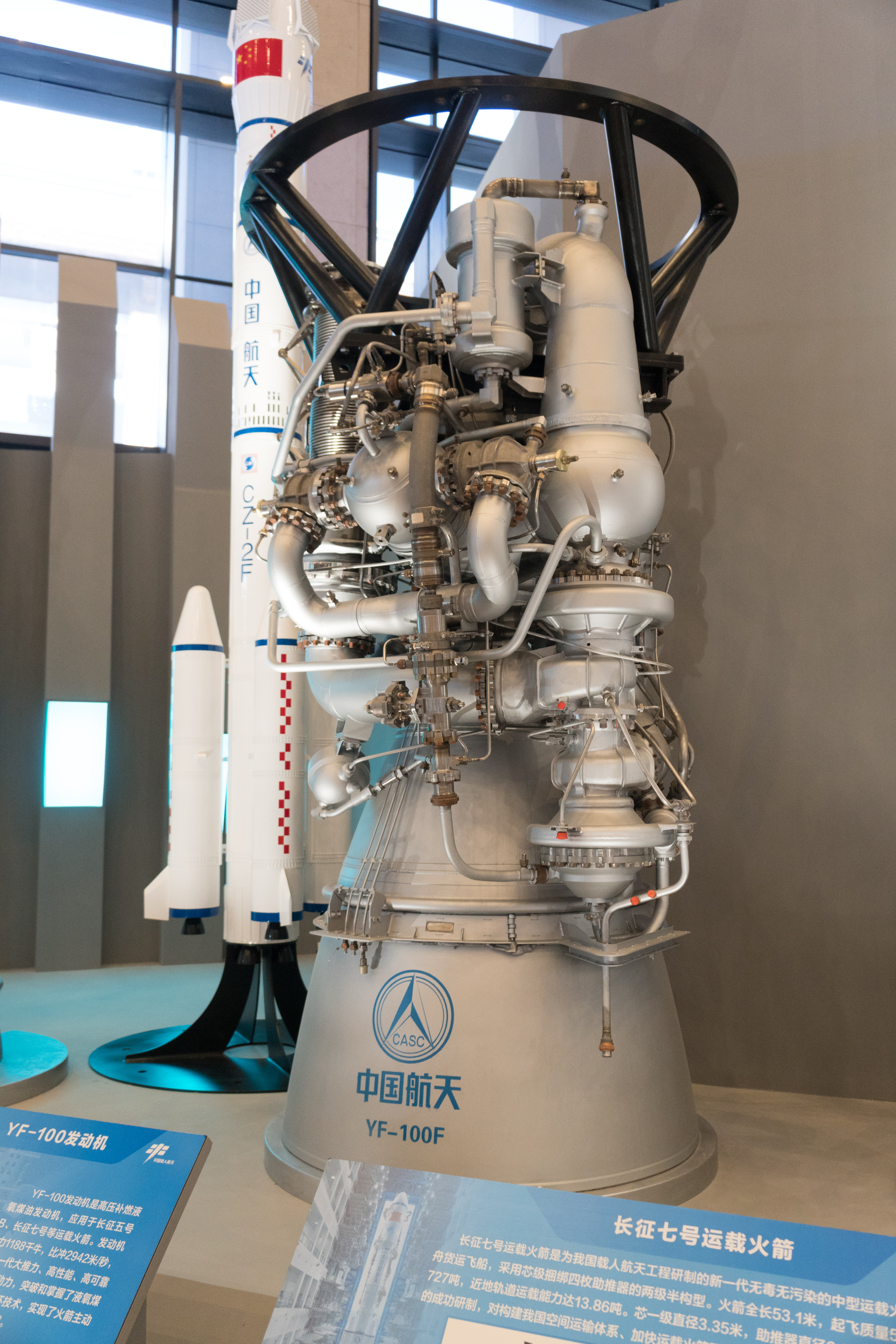
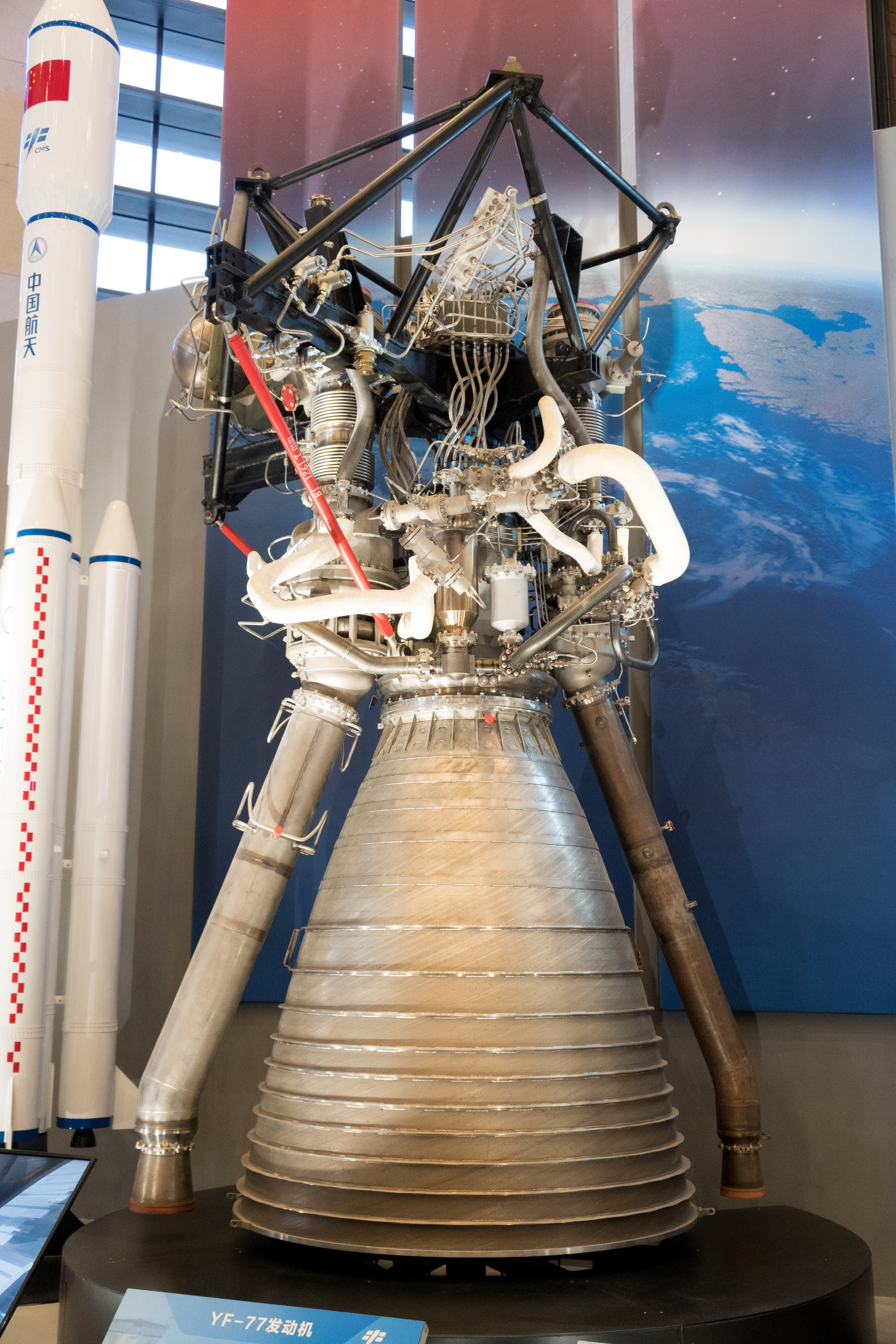
The YF-100 and YF-77 engines used by Long March 5.

The chief designer of CZ-5 is Li Dong (Chinese: 李东) of the China Academy of Launch Vehicle Technology (CALT). The CZ-5 family includes three primary modular core stages of 5.2-m diameter (maximum). The vehicle's total length is 60.5 meters and its weight at launch is 643 tons, with a thrust of 833.8 tons. Boosters of various capabilities and diameters ranging from 2.25 meters to 3.35 meters would be assembled from three modular core stages and strap-on stages. The first stage and boosters would have a choice of engines that use different liquid rocket propellants: 1200 kN thrust LOX / kerosene engines or 1550 kN thrust LOX / LH2. The upper stage would use improved versions of the YF-75 engine.

Engine development began in 2000–2001, with testing directed by the China National Space Administration (CNSA) commencing in 2005. Versions of both new engines, the YF-100 and the YF-77, had been successfully tested by mid-2007.

The CZ-5 series can deliver ~23 tonnes of payload to LEO or ~14 tonnes of payload to GTO (geosynchronous transfer orbit). The CZ-5 launch vehicle would consist of a 5.0-m diameter core stage and four 3.35-m diameter strap-on boosters, which would be able to send a ~22 tonne payload to low Earth orbit (LEO).

Six CZ-5 variants were originally planned, but the light variants were cancelled in favor of CZ-6 and CZ-7 family launch vehicles.

Active
Version	CZ-5	CZ-5B
Boosters	4 × (CZ-5-300, 2 × YF-100)	4 × (CZ-5-300, 2 × YF-100)
First stage	CZ-5-500, 2 × YF-77	CZ-5-500, 2 × YF-77
Second stage	CZ-5-HO, 2 × YF-75D	—
Third stage (optional)	Yuanzheng-2	Yuanzheng-2
Thrust (at ground)	10.62 MN	10.62 MN
Launch weight	851,800 kg	837,500 kg
Height	56.97 m	53.66 m
Payload (LEO 200 km)	—	~25,000 kg
Payload (GTO)	14,000 kg	—

Proposed
Version	CZ-5-200	CZ-5-320	CZ-5-522	CZ-5-540
Boosters	—	2 × CZ-5-200, YF-100	2 × CZ-5-200, YF-100; 2 × CZ-5-300, 2 × YF-100	4 × CZ-5-200, YF-100
First stage	CZ-5-200, YF-100	CZ-5-300, 2 × YF-100	CZ-5-500, 2 × YF-77	CZ-5-500, 2 × YF-77
Second stage	CZ-YF-73, YF-73	CZ-5-KO,	CZ-5-HO, 2 × YF-75D	CZ-5-HO, 2 × YF-75D
Third stage (not used for LEO)	—	CZ-5-HO, YF-75	—	—
Thrust (at ground)	1.34 MN	7.2 MN	8.24 MN	5.84 MN
Launch weight	82,000 kg	420,000 kg	630,000 kg	470,000 kg
Height (maximal)	33 m	55 m	58 m	53 m
Payload (LEO 200 km)	1500 kg	10,000 kg	20,000 kg	10,000 kg
Payload (GTO)	—	6000 kg	11,000 kg	6000 kg

== Space debris concerns ==
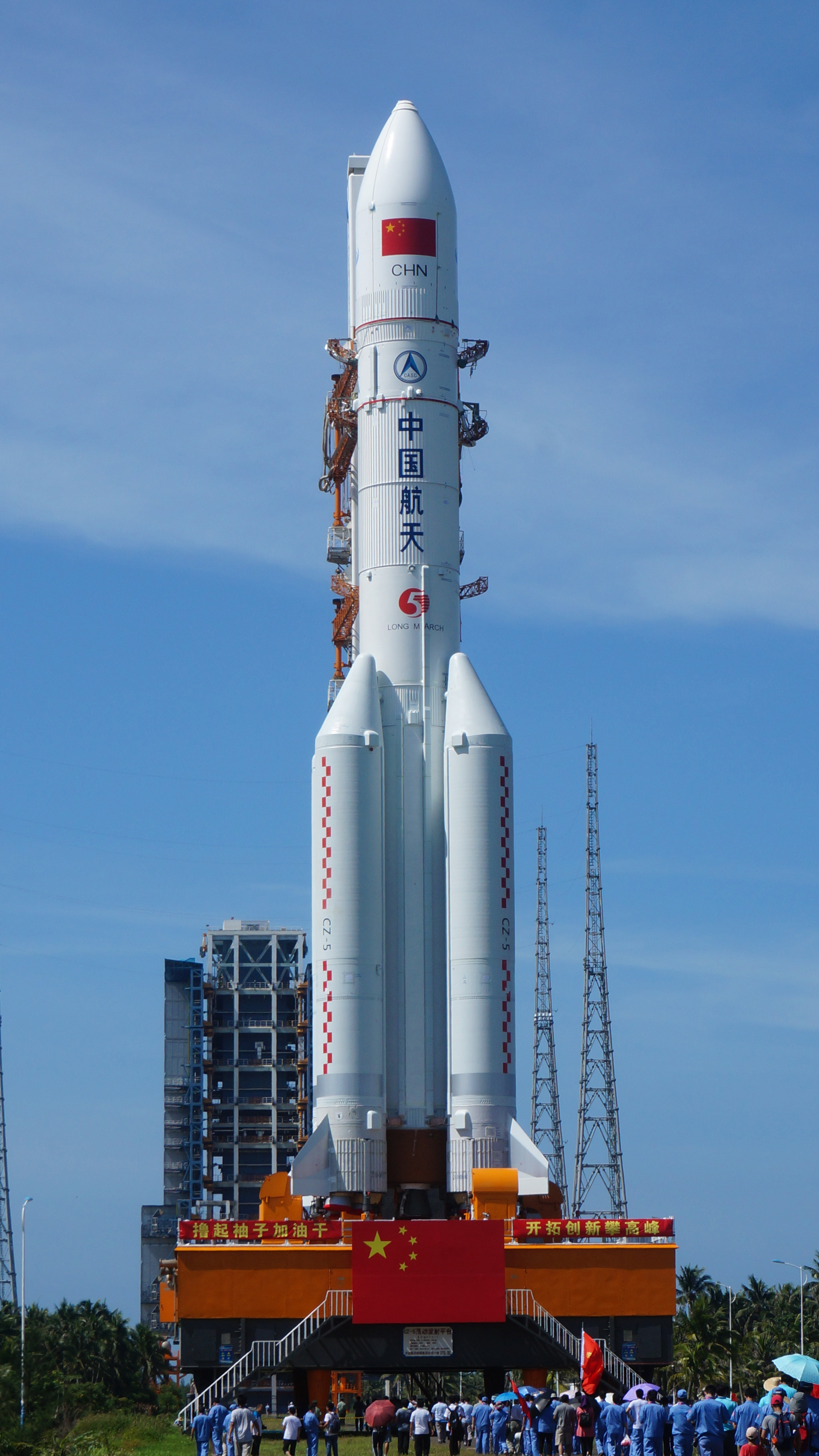
Long March 5 Y2 being transported from assembly building to 101 launch site at Wenchang Space Launch Site.

The first stage of the Long March 5B variant, which can reach orbital velocity and weighs 21.6 tonnes, currently lacks the capability for controlled atmospheric re-entry, meaning that debris could cause damage on the ground upon re-entry. Without modification, it is expected all LEO launches of the Long March 5B will result in uncontrolled re-entries.

The 5B is the specific variant in concern due to its unique LEO configuration. The core rocket stage (first stage) is launched directly into orbit, which also unusually serves as the upper stage to perform payload insertion. Typically, the rocket's first stage never reaches orbital velocity, while the smaller upper stage will usually burn up in the atmosphere during re-entry. However, Long March 5B's first and upper stage is combined into one, making the mitigation effort more difficult.

Potential solutions include restarting engines during re-entry to reduce speed and collision probability, as the case for Long March 2D. China has also developed grid fins on other Long March variants to steer stages during re-entry. However, Long March 5B has yet to demonstrate these capabilities.

The debris found at Ivory Coast in May 2022 was reportedly the remains of the first Long March 5B launch (5B-Y1). Although the probability of rocket debris hitting populated areas is mathematically minuscule, some scientists fear the lax attitude of many countries could eventually result in casualties.

Responding to the criticism, CNSA claimed they had conducted measures to ensure safe re-entries. Xu Yansong, former director for international cooperation at the China National Space Administration (CNSA), told the audience on the CNSA live stream for 5B-Y3 that the re-entry process was improved with the "passivation process" (Chinese: 钝化处理), and the core stage was specially designed with lighter materials so the vast majority of components will be ablated during the re-entry. Before the launch of 5B-Y4, Liu Bing, deputy director-designer of the Long March 5B, told journalists that "an elaborative evaluation" was performed on the 5B to enable safe re-entry, though no details regarding the improved re-entry procedure were revealed.

The core stage of the Long March 5B-Y3 re-entered Earth's atmosphere on 30 July 2022 over the Indian and Pacific oceans. The debris of 5B-Y4 fell down in south-central Pacific Ocean on 4 November 2022.

On 16 December 2024, the Long March 5B Y6 was launched with Yuanzheng-2 upper stage, meaning the core stage would not enter the orbit and return uncontrolled. The next two 5B launches (5B-Y7 and Y8) also included a Yuanzheng-2 upper stage. But the planned 5B-Y5 may not.

== Launch statistics ==
Rockets in the Long March 5 family currently have accumulated a total of 18 launches as of 11 June 2026. Of these, 17 were successful with a single failed launch. The cumulative success rate is 94.4%.

=== Launch outcomes ===
- Failure
- Partial failure
- Success
- Planned

=== Rocket configurations ===
- CZ-5
- CZ-5B

== List of launches ==
The “TBD” in the bottom of the list means “To Be Determined”.

Flight No.	Date (UTC)	Variant	Launch site	Upper stage	Photo	Payload	Orbit	Result
Y1	3 November 2016; 12:43	5	Wenchang, LC-1	YZ-2		Shijian 17	GTO	Success
Y2	2 July 2017; 11:23	5	Wenchang, LC-1	None		Shijian 18	GTO	Failure (Core stage)
Y3	27 December 2019; 12:45	5	Wenchang, LC-1	None		Shijian 20	GTO	Success
5B-Y1	5 May 2020; 10:00	5B	Wenchang, LC-1	None		Mengzhou crewed spacecraft prototype	LEO	Success
Y4	23 July 2020; 04:41	5	Wenchang, LC-1	None		Tianwen-1, Mars orbiter, lander and rover	TMI	Success
Y5	23 November 2020; 20:30	5	Wenchang, LC-1	None		Chang'e 5, lunar sample-return	TLI	Success
5B-Y2	29 April 2021; 03:23:15	5B	Wenchang, LC-1	None		Tianhe, Tiangong space station core module	LEO	Success
5B-Y3	24 July 2022; 06:22:32	5B	Wenchang, LC-1	None		Wentian, Tiangong space station experiment module I	LEO	Success
5B-Y4	31 October 2022; 07:37:23	5B	Wenchang, LC-1	None		Mengtian, Tiangong space station experiment module II	LEO	Success
Y6	15 December 2023; 13:41	5	Wenchang, LC-1	None		Yaogan 41	GTO	Success
Y7	23 February 2024; 11:30	5	Wenchang, LC-1	None		TJS-11	GTO	Success
Y8	3 May 2024; 09:27	5	Wenchang, LC-1	None		Chang'e 6, lunar far-side sample-return	TLI	Success
5B-Y6	16 December 2024; 10:00	5B	Wenchang, LC-1	YZ-2		Hulianwang × 10 (SatNet LEO Group 01)	LEO	Success
5B-Y7	28 April 2025; 20:10	5B	Wenchang, LC-1	YZ-2		Hulianwang × 10 (SatNet LEO Group 03)	LEO	Success
5B-Y8	13 August 2025; 06:43	5B	Wenchang, LC-1	YZ-2		Hulianwang × 10 (SatNet LEO Group 08)	LEO	Success
Y9	23 October 2025; 14:30	5	Wenchang, LC-1	None		TJS-20	GTO	Success
Y10	20 December 2025; 12:30	5	Wenchang, LC-1	None		TJS-23	GTO	Success
Y11	11 June 2026; 07:30	5	Wenchang, LC-1	None		TJS-25	GTO	Success
Y14	2027	5	Wenchang, LC-1	None		Chang'e 7, Lunar Antarctic Comprehensive Exploration Mission	TLI	Planned
5B-Y5	2027	5B	Wenchang, LC-1	None		Xuntian	LEO	Planned
	2029	5	Wenchang, LC-1	None		Chang'e 8, Scientific exploration test, lunar surface test	TLI	Planned
	2028	5	Wenchang, LC-1	None		Tianwen-3 part 1, Mars sample-return mission	TMI	Planned
	2028	5	Wenchang, LC-1	None		Tianwen-3 part 2, Mars sample-return mission	TMI	Planned
	September 2029	5	Wenchang, LC-1	None		Tianwen-4, Jupiter orbiter and Uranus flyby probe	HCO	Planned
	TBD	5	Wenchang, LC-1	None		Shensuo (IHP-1; IHP-2)	HCO	Planned

== See also ==
- List of Long March launches (2025-2029)
- Comparison of orbital launcher families
- Comparison of orbital launch systems
- Expendable launch system
- Lists of rockets
