= Bahrain Space Agency =

Government entity

- وكالة البحرين للفضاء
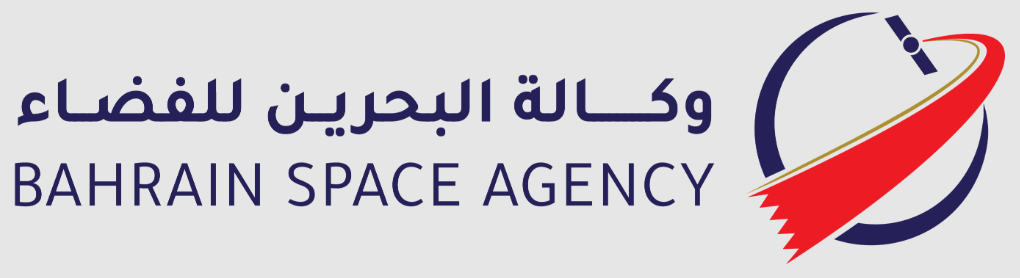

Agency overview
- Abbreviation: BSA
- Formed: 2014
- Type: Space agency
- Headquarters: Kingdom of Bahrain
- Administrator: Mohamed Al Aseeri
- Website: www.bsa.bh

The Bahrain Space Agency (BSA; Arabic: وكالة البحرين للفضاء, romanized: Wikalat AlBahrain Lil-Faḍāʼ), previously known as the National Space Science Agency until 2025 when Royal Decree No 14 renamed it to the Bahrain Space Agency, is the Bahraini government entity responsible for space science program. It was established by Royal Decree No. 11 for the Year 2014 and works under the supervision of the Supreme Defense Council.

== Activities ==
BSA's current focus is on promoting space science, technology and applications in the Kingdom of Bahrain through many community events; building capacity in the fields of satellite manufacturing, satellite tracking, control and monitoring, earth observation data and image processing and analysis to fulfil stakeholders' national needs; and creating a new “space” sector in the Kingdom.

The BSA offers 3 services: providing high resolution images for the Kingdom of Bahrain in different sizes and formats; processing and analyzing satellite imagery and data to generate useful information to fulfil stakeholders needs; and providing Satellite Images and Data for the Kingdom of Bahrain in different resolutions, bands and selected time.

The BSA have signed many memorandum of understanding with regional and international space agencies such as between BSA and the United Arab Emirates Space Agency (UAESA), Mohammed bin Rashid Space Centre (MBRSC), Egyptian Space Agency (EgSA), Sultanate of Oman Ministry of Transport, Communications and Information Technology, Russian state space corporation (Roscosmos), Indian Space Research Organisation (ISRO), Chinese National Space Administration (CNSA), and UK Space Agency (UKSA).
