= Chang'e 5-T1 =

Chinese lunar probe (2014–2020)

- Chang'e 5-T1's re-entry module (Xiaofei) after vacuum thermal tests on 13 June 2014.
- Mission type: Chang'e 5 precursor mission Lunar flyby and Earth reentry
- Operator: CNSA
- COSPAR ID: 2014-065A
- SATCAT no.: 40283
- Mission duration: Flyby/orbiter: 8 days (planned); 6 years, 1 month, 1 day (final); Return capsule: 8 days, 4 hours, 42 minutes

Spacecraft properties
- Bus: DFH-3A
- Manufacturer: CAST
- Launch mass: 3,300 kg (7,300 lb)
- BOL mass: ~2,215 kg (4,883 lb)
- Landing mass: 335 kg (739 lb)

Start of mission
- Launch date: 23 October 2014, 18:00 UTC
- Rocket: Long March 3C/G2
- Launch site: Xichang LC-2

End of mission
- Disposal: Decommissioned/Recovered
- Last contact: 24 November 2020, 08:50 UTC; Flyby/orbiter
- Landing date: 31 October 2014, 22:42 UTC; Return capsule
- Landing site: Siziwang Banner, Inner Mongolia

Orbital parameters
- Reference system: Geocentric
- Regime: Lunar free return

Chang'e 5-T1 (嫦娥五号T1; Cháng'é wǔhào T1) was an preparatory robotic lunar mission launched by China National Space Administration on 23 October 2014. It was in preparation for Chang'e 5, launched in 2020, the first sample-return mission of the Chinese Lunar Exploration Program. Launched by a Long March 3C on a free-return trajectory around the Moon, the mission consisted of a return capsule, which landed on Earth after eight days, and a service module lunar orbiter, which remained active until at least 2018.

The return capsule of Chang'e 5-T1, named Xiaofei (小飞; 'little flyer'), tested the Chang'e 5 design's atmospheric re-entry capacity, landing eight days later, on 31 October, in the Dorbod Banner landing site in Inner Mongolia, also used by the China Manned Space Program. The DFH-3A service module entered lunar orbit on 13 January 2015. This was initially a 200 x 5,300 km Lissajous orbit around Earth-Moon L_{2} with a period of 8 hours, from which it performed two "virtual target" rendezvous tests, preparing for the docking of the service module and ascender components used by the Chang'e 5 mission profile.

In March 2022, the Long March 3C's third stage booster impacted the Moon near the Hertzsprung crater, having been in a trans-lunar trajectory for over seven years.

== Characteristics ==
Successful re-entry

It consisted of a DFH-3A "Chang'e 2 type" spacecraft with a mass of approximately 2,215 kg (including 1,065 kg of fuel) carrying the Chang'e 5 return capsule with a mass of under 335 kg. The craft was launched by a Long March 3C rocket into a lunar free return trajectory. It looped behind the Moon and returned to Earth, with the return capsule testing the high speed atmospheric skip reentry.

The DFH-3A "service module" remained in orbit around the Earth before being relocated via Earth-Moon L_{2} to lunar Lissajous orbit by 13 January 2015, where it will use its remaining 800 kg of fuel to test maneuvers key to future lunar missions.

In February and March 2015, the DFH-3A "service module" performed two "virtual target" rendezvous tests for the future Chang'e 5 mission. In April 2015, the small monitoring camera was used to obtain higher resolution photos of Chang'e 5's landing zone.

== Mission profile ==
=== Main Mission ===
- Launch: Xichang Satellite Launch Center, 23 October 2014, 18:00 UTC
- Nominal mission duration: Chang'e 5 return capsule: 196 hours (8.17 days)
- Nominal mission duration: DFH-3A: Ongoing
- Lunar fly-by: 97 hours after final orbit insertion (4.04 days)
- Periselenium: ≈13,000 km from Moon surface
- Distance of Moon from Earth at closest fly-by: ≈373,000 km
- Landing: Siziwang Banner, Inner Mongolia, 31 October 2014, 22:42 UTC

=== Lunar Orbiter ===
In January 2015, the service module transitioned to lunar orbit, orbiting at 200x5300 km. It was still active in early 2018 and was last heard by amateur radio-astronomers in late 2020.

=== Third stage disposal ===
Animation of Chang'e 5-T1 booster's impact on the Moon on March 4, 2022 Chang'e 5-T1 booster · Earth · Moon

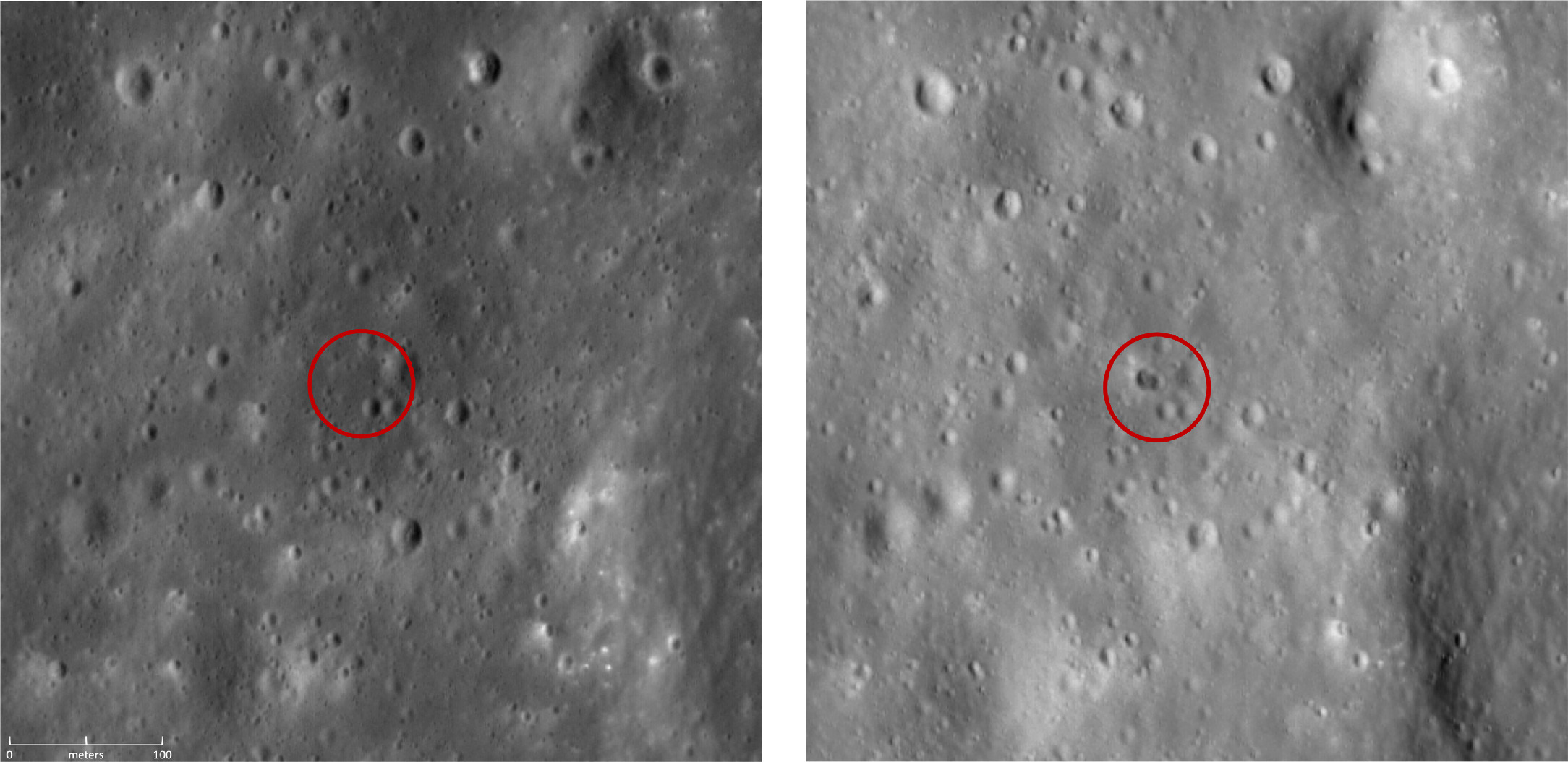
Lunar impact craters of the third-stage booster from China's Chang'e 5-T1.The impact position for the booster was at latitude 5.18 N, longitude 233.55 E.

The Long March 3C third stage booster, left in orbit between the Earth and the Moon, was predicted to hit, and did hit, the Moon on March 4, 2022, impacting near the Hertzsprung crater. Independent spectral analysis from the University of Arizona confirmed its Chinese origin. NASA has published a note on the event. China's foreign ministry has denied this identification, stating that the booster had already burned up in the Earth's atmosphere (albeit referring to the later Chang'e 5 mission in his answer). The US Space Command confirmed the third stage never reentered in Earth's atmosphere, and a compatible item is now present on the Space-Track catalogue as object 85900. The impactor object was previously misidentified as 2015-007B, the second stage of the Falcon 9 rocket which launched NASA's Deep Space Climate Observatory (DSCOVR) spacecraft, but was later correctly identified as the Long March stage in February 2022. The event showed the challenges of tracking small objects in deep space, underlining the importance of sustainability in space operations going forward.

In June 2022, a compatible double crater was found by the LROC team at the same location previously estimated, and later by Chandrayaan-2 OHRC.

== Secondary payloads ==
Chang'e 5-T1 also carried the first commercial payload to the Moon, the 4M mission (Manfred Memorial Moon Mission) for the German space technology company OHB System. It was named in honor of the company's founder, Manfred Fuchs, who died in 2014. Technical management of the 4M mission was performed by LuxSpace. The payload weighed 14 kilograms and contained two scientific instruments. The first instrument was a radio beacon to test a new approach for locating spacecraft. Amateur radio operators were encouraged via prize incentives to receive the transmissions and send the results back to LuxSpace. The second instrument, a radiation dosimeter provided by the Spanish company iC-Málaga, continuously measured radiation levels throughout the satellite's circumlunar path. The spacecraft carried a radiation exposure experiment with bacteria and plants. The probe impacted the Moon in 2022.

== See also ==
- China National Space Administration (CNSA)
- Chinese space program
  - Chinese Lunar Exploration Program
  - Planetary Exploration of China
- Exploration of the Moon
- List of missions to the Moon
- Robotic exploration of the Moon
