= List of extraterrestrial memorials =

Objects in space created in recognition of prominent figures

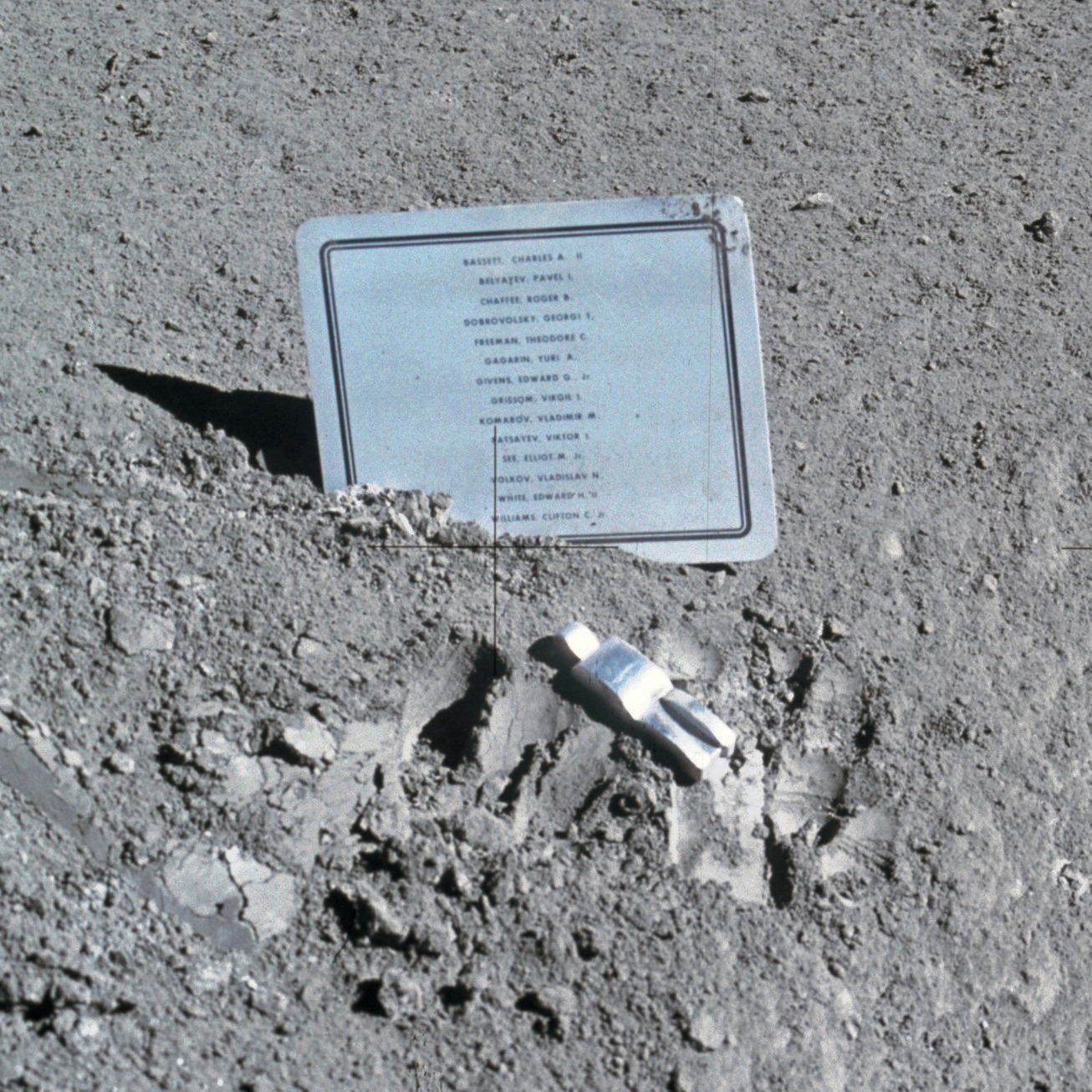
Fallen Astronaut plaque and statue on the Moon, placed there during the 1971 Apollo 15 mission

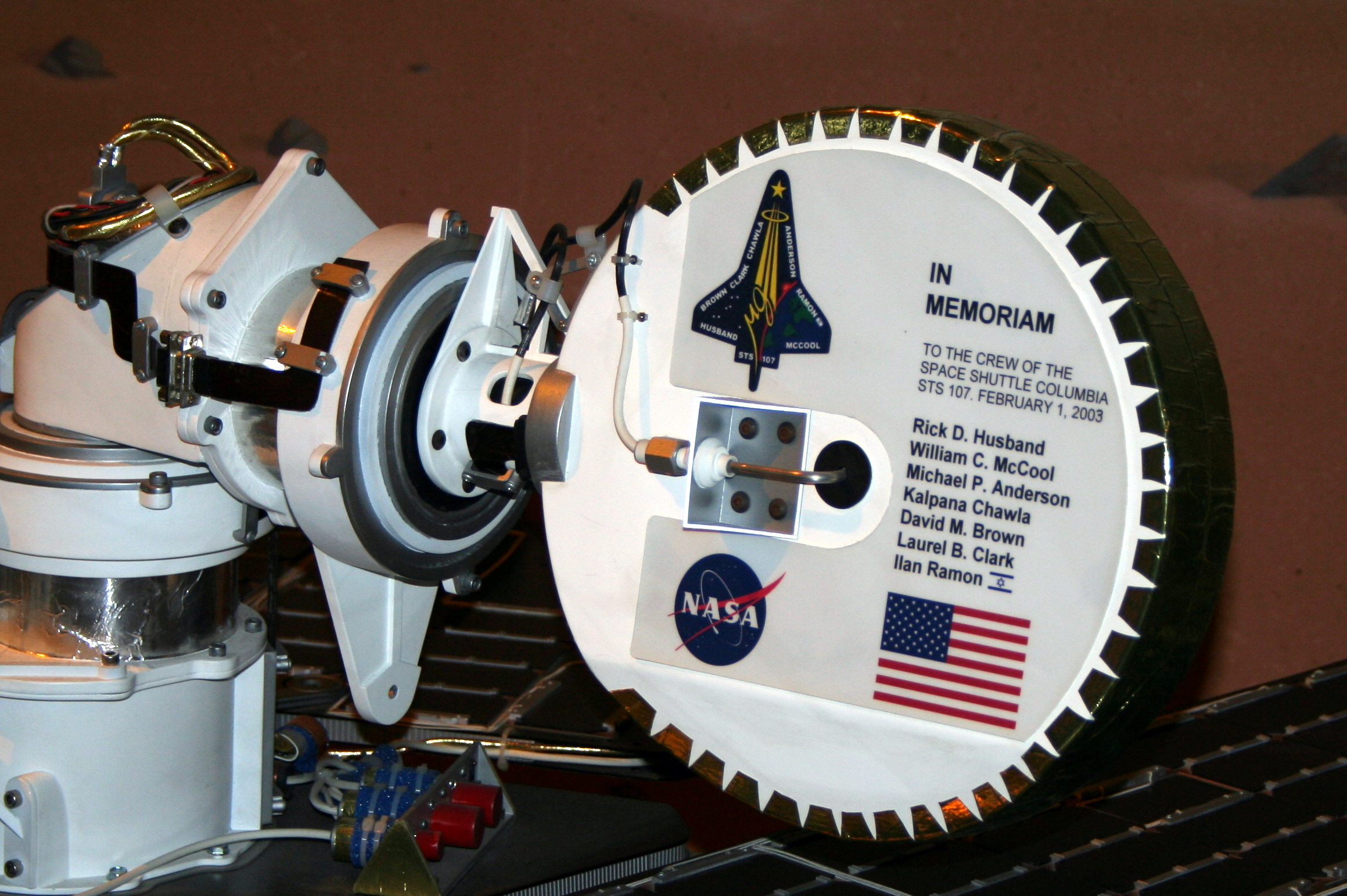
The Mars rover Spirit contains a memorial to the crew of the Space Shuttle Columbia's STS-107 2003 mission, which disintegrated upon reentry.

This list of extraterrestrial memorials compiles the human-made memorials not located on Earth.

== Mars ==
Landing sites:

- Thomas Mutch Memorial Station – Viking 1 lander (1976)
- Gerald Soffen Memorial Station – Viking 2 lander (1976)
- Carl Sagan Memorial Station – Mars Pathfinder (Sojourner) base (1997)
- Challenger Memorial Station – MER-B (Opportunity) landing site area (2004)
- Columbia Memorial Station – MER-A (Spirit) landing site area (2004)
- Green Valley – Phoenix lander (2008)
- Phoenix DVD
- Bradbury Landing – Curiosity rover landing site (August 6, 2012) (no actual hardware at location)
- Rafael Navarro Mountain – Curiosity rover (April 5, 2021)
- InSight Landing – InSight lander (2018)
- Octavia E. Butler Landing – Perseverance rover landing site (2021)
- Wright Brothers Field – first take-off and landing area of Ingenuity helicopter (2021)
- Valinor Hills, last landing spot and final resting place of Ingenuity in Airfield Chi (χ) before retirement due to sustained rotor blade damage (2024)

Memorials and artifacts:

- Pennants of Soviet Union on Mars 2 and Mars 3 landers (1971)
- Lincoln penny – Curiosity rover
- Tribute to healthcare workers plate and Martian Meteorite – Perseverance rover
- "Send Your Name to Mars" – Perseverance rover
- DNA Inscription – Perseverance rover
- Mars rover family portrait – Perseverance rover
- Parachute with coded message "Dare mighty things" – Perseverance rover
- The Ingenuity helicopter carries a small piece of fabric from the wing of the first powered aircraft, the 1903 Wright Flyer built and flown by the Wright Brothers

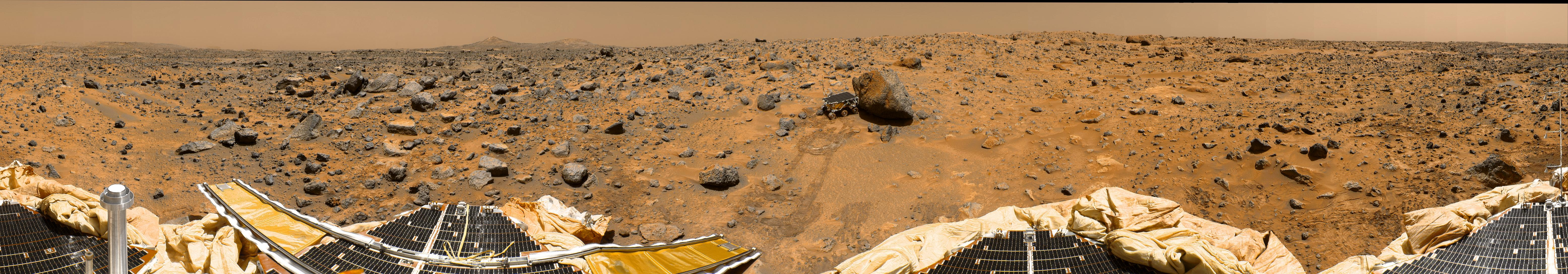
Carl Sagan Memorial Station (1997)

== Earth orbit ==
- Plaque designed by Carl Sagan on LAGEOS-1
- Immortality Drive, in the International Space Station
- A GeoSat time capsule aboard EchoStar XVI, The Last Pictures (includes 100 black and white photographs)
- Apollo 15 postal covers on the International Space Station
- 3 Lego Astronauts of Expedition 42: Terry Virts, Anton Shkaplerov, and Samantha Cristoforetti
- The LEO library by the Arch Mission Foundation

== The Moon ==
- Fallen Astronaut – a lunar plaque and small memorial statue for lives lost in space exploration. It was placed on the Moon during the 1971 Apollo 15 mission.
- Plaques and flags at the landing sites of Apollo 11, 12, 14, 15, 16, and 17
- Pennants of the Soviet Union on Luna 2 impactor
- Flag of India – aboard ISRO's Moon Impact Probe, which was released by Chandrayaan-1 and impacted the lunar surface on 14 November 2008.
- Moon Museum – a ceramic wafer containing artwork from Andy Warhol, Robert Rauschenberg, David Novros, Forrest Myers, Claes Oldenburg, and John Chamberlain. It was left on the leg of the lunar module on Apollo 12.
- Luna 01 from Celestis
- Arch Mission Foundation's Lunar Library – possibly survived the Beresheet Moon lander's crash landing
- Flag of China on Chang'e 5 and 6.
- Manfred Memorial Moon Mission – a lunar flyby and Earth orbit in memorial to Manfred Fuchs
- Lunaprise A time capsule – on the Nova-C lunar lander
- Moon Phases – 125 one-inch Moon sculptures by Jeff Koons, each inscribed with the names of historical and cultural figures, carried on Intuitive Machines' Odysseus lander, which landed on the Moon in February 2024.

=== Planned ===
- Luna 03
- Lunar Codex's Nova Collection – art and poetry on Nanofiche on the Nova-C lunar lander in 2022
- Lunar Codex's Polaris Collection – art, books, poetry, music and film on hybrid memory cards and Nanofiche on the Griffin lunar lander in 2023/24

== Titan ==
- Hubert Curien Memorial Station – Huygens landing site on Titan

== Jupiter ==
- Three LEGO figurines – Juno spacecraft
- Galileo Galilei plaque – Juno

== Other ==
- Two Voyager Golden Records – Voyager spacecraft
- Arch Mission disk 1.2 – Tesla Roadster in solar orbit
- Rosetta disk prototype – Rosetta space probe
- New Horizons Memorabilia
- The Pioneer plaques – individual plaques on Pioneer 10 and Pioneer 11

=== Proposed ===
- KEO
