= Lunar fluorescence =

Lunar fluorescence is the process where minerals along the surface of the Moon, like the silicate minerals plagioclase feldspar, pyroxene, and olivine, absorb solar radiation, i.e. UV or X-ray solar radiation and release visible light. These minerals release the light at specific wavelengths according to the chemical composition of the minerals. Plagioclase feldspar, for instance, generally has blue or green fluorescence, while olivine has reddish fluorescence.

== Description ==
This process of lunar fluorescence is due to the interaction between the solar wind and the lunar regolith. Lunar fluorescence aids the identification of minerals along the surface of the Moon. From the observation of fluorescence spectra, the geochemical characteristics, distribution of minerals, and the soil composition of the Moon can be determined. Lunar fluorescence gives information regarding the geological history of the Moon, including volcanic activity and ancient impacts. Recently, scientists detected the existence of water molecules along the polar regions of the Moon using fluorescence data. Remote sensing and in-situ approaches are employed to monitor lunar fluorescence. NASA’s Lunar Reconnaissance Orbiter (LRO) Lyman-Alpha Mapping Project (LAMP) instrument receives UV fluorescence. Further, in the year 2020, water molecules and novel minerals along the surface of the Moon were detected through the use of fluorescence data, using samples retrieved using the Chang'e-5 mission. The LAMP instrument of the LRO mission proved the existence of shadowy ice along the craters at the south pole of the Moon using fluorescence signals. Nevertheless, fluorescence signals tend to be weak and are detected using high-resolution instruments. Solar wind, along with the interference of cosmic rays, can complicate the signals, too.
