= Manfred Memorial Moon Mission =

Private lunar probe

- Names: 4M
- Mission type: Reconnaissance, memorial
- Operator: LuxSpace
- COSPAR ID: 2014-065B
- SATCAT no.: 40284
- Website: luxspace.lu
- Mission duration: 19 days

Spacecraft properties
- Manufacturer: LuxSpace
- Launch mass: Payload 14 kg, 3rd stage of rocket to which payload was permanently attached 21,000 kg, Nominal total=21,014 kg
- Dry mass: 14 kg (31 lb)
- Dimensions: 61 cm × 26 cm × 10 cm (2.00 ft × 0.85 ft × 0.33 ft)
- Power: 4.5 W

Start of mission
- Launch date: 23 October 2014, 18:00:04 UTC
- Rocket: Long March 3C/G2
- Launch site: Xichang LC-2

End of mission
- Disposal: Crashed
- Destroyed: 4 March 2022

Orbital parameters
- Reference system: Geocentric
- Regime: Highly Elliptical
- Perigee altitude: 1,282 kilometers (797 mi)
- Apogee altitude: 404,724 kilometers (251,484 mi)
- Inclination: 30.4°
- Period: 10.93 days

Flyby of Moon
- Closest approach: 28 October 2014
- Distance: 13,000 km (8,100 mi)

Manfred Memorial Moon Mission (4M) was the first private lunar probe to successfully fly by the Moon. It was led by LuxSpace, a child company of German OHB System, and named in honor of OHB Systems founder, Manfred Fuchs, who died in 2014. It was launched with the Chinese Chang'e 5-T1 test spacecraft on 23 October 2014. The lunar flyby took place on 28 October 2014, after which the spacecraft entered elliptical Earth orbit and continued transmission until 11 November 2014, exceeding its designed lifetime by four times.

The spacecraft, along with the rocket stage to which it was attached, likely made impact with the surface of the Moon after its orbit decayed, on 4 March 2022. This made Luxembourg the eighth country to reach the surface of the Moon.

== Spacecraft ==
REMEMBER THE SPACE PIONEER MANFRED FUCHS.
REST IN PEACE MANFRED FUCHS.
DAMIT ALLE MENSCHEN AUF DERWELT IN FRIEDEN ZUSAMMEN LEBEN.
LA LI LU NUR DER MANN IM MOND SCHAUTZU WENN DIE KLEINEN KINDER SCHLAFEN UND SO SCHLAF AUCH DU.
DO NOT GO WHERE THE PATH MAY LEAD GO INSTEAD WHERE THERE IS NO PATH AND LEAVE
A TRAIL.
ALL LIFE IS AN EXPERIMENT. THE MORE EXPERIMENTS YOU MAKE THE BETTER.

— Part of the message sent by the 4M

The briefcase-sized probe, with a mass of 14 kg was built by the Luxemburg company LuxSpace. Its primary power source consisted of 28 non-rechargeable Saft LSH20 HTS lithium cells, which provided 4.5 W power for the payload electronics. It was permanently attached to the Long March 3C/G2 upper stage through the mission, and its design was adapted to function near the electromagnetic interference from the rocket's 1 kW S band transmitter. The secondary power source included 4 Saft MPS lithium-ion batteries recharged by a 2x8 grid of solar panels, to recharge its batteries. Unlike the primary power source, however, it was dependent on the spacecraft attitude (orientation) and rotation rate, determining the availability of sunlight to recharge the batteries. The onboard computer was an FM430.

=== Payload ===
Amateur radio

The radio payload consisted of a quarter-wave monopole antenna supported by an I/Q modulator, and an RF power amplifier providing 1.5 W power. The probe's antenna transmitted up to 2,500, 13-character digital messages at 145.980 MHz using digital mode JT65B, with additional tone transmissions. LuxSpace created a contest with prizes for amateur radio operators to receive these transmissions and send results back to the company. The radio was activated 77.8 minutes after the launch, and the first radio signal was received in Brazil at 19:18 UTC. The team expected 10 participants to join the contest, but more than 60 people took part. Scoring was based on the number of messages received.

Dosimeter

The 4M probe featured a small dosimeter that measured ionizing radiation in space. The instrument was provided by the Spanish company iC-Málaga. The instrument measured the total ionizing dose every 5 minutes, and it showed a significant increase in radiation doses while crossing Van Allen radiation belts. 215 hours into the mission, the radiation sensor stopped working for unknown reasons.

== Mission ==
The probe was permanently attached to the third stage of Long March 3C/G2 on 23 October 2014 at 18:00 UTC along with Chang'e 5-T1, making its closest flyby a day after Chang'e 5-T1. The lunar flyby took place during the night of 28 October 2014. After that, the probe entered a highly elliptical geocentric orbit with a period of 14 days and it remains in space. The last transmission from the spacecraft was received on 11 November 2014, 01:35 UTC.

It is expected that the booster, along with 4M, should have impacted the Moon on March 4, 2022, near the Hertzsprung crater. A campaign to reacquire radio contact with the probe, knowing it could theoretically be reactivated depending on the orientation of the solar panels, was performed both by radioastronomers and amateurs, but without success.

== Honorifics ==
The 4M probe was the first private lunar probe to successfully perform a lunar flyby. A similar flyby on 13 May 1998 by the PAS-22 satellite, at the time called HGS-1, a geostationary communications satellite made a lunar flyby in a recovery attempt after a partially failed launch that left it on an unusable highly elliptical orbit. Using gravity assist manoeuvres, the satellite was successfully recovered on 17 June. Unlike the 4M mission, the HGS-1 was not designed as a lunar mission, and made a flyby only in a recovery attempt, however according to Hughes Global Services, the satellite operator at the time, it claimed the title of the first commercial mission to the Moon.

The first commercial payload to the surface of the Moon was by Celestis, that paid for commercial transportation of a human remains memorial on board the Lunar Prospector, which impacted the Moon's surface on 31 July 1999.

== See also ==
- Exploration of the Moon
- List of missions to the Moon
- List of extraterrestrial memorials
