= Octavia E. Butler Landing =

Landing site of Mars Perseverance rover

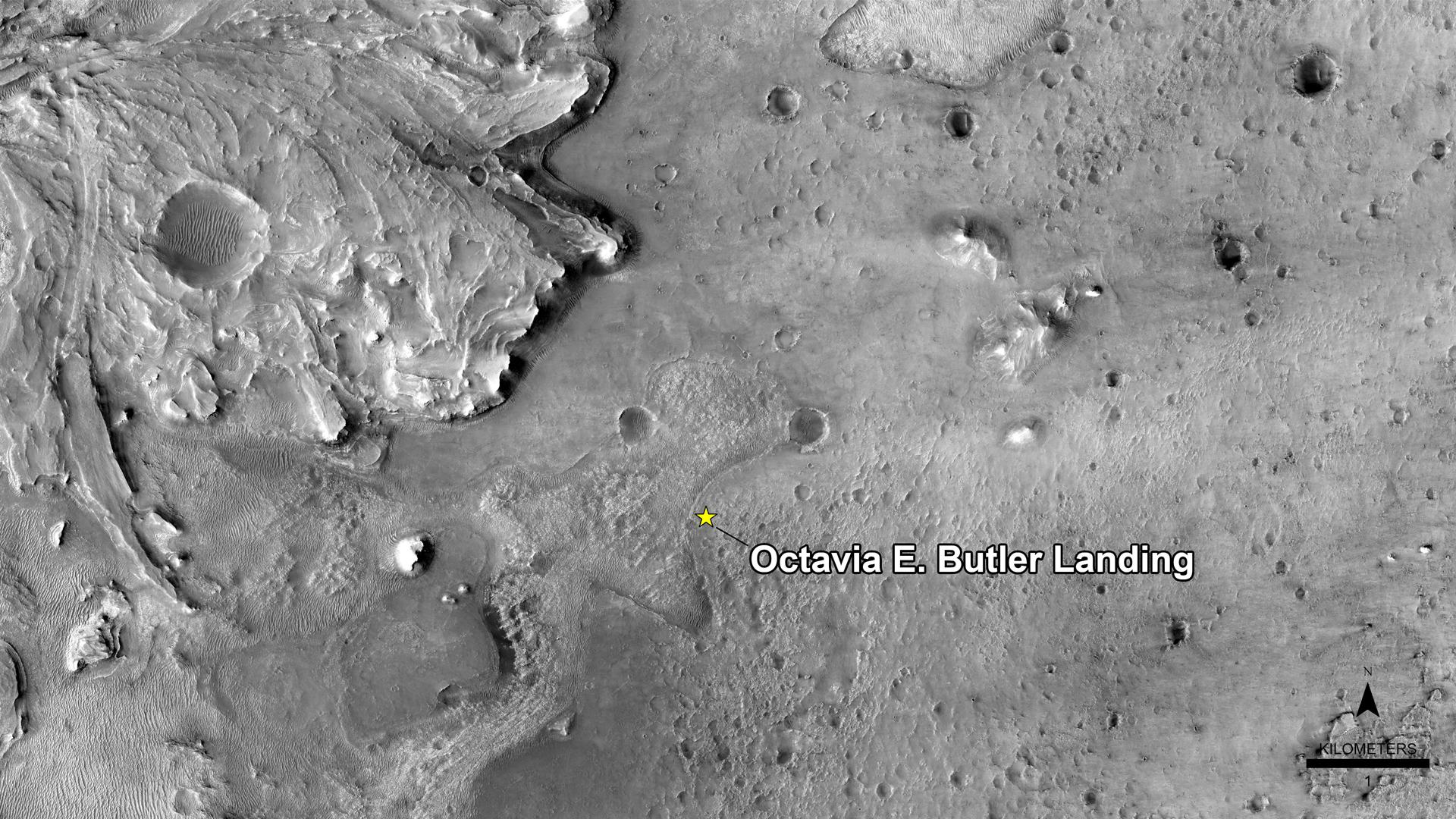
The Mars Perseverance rover landed at the Octavia E. Butler Landing site in Jezero Crater.

Octavia E. Butler Landing is the February 18, 2021, landing site of the Mars 2020 Perseverance rover within Jezero crater on planet Mars. On March 5, 2021, NASA named the site for the American science fiction author, Octavia E. Butler, who died on February 24, 2006. The Mars landing took place nearly 15 years to the day after her death. The coordinates of the landing site on Mars are 18.44°N 77.45°E

== Description ==
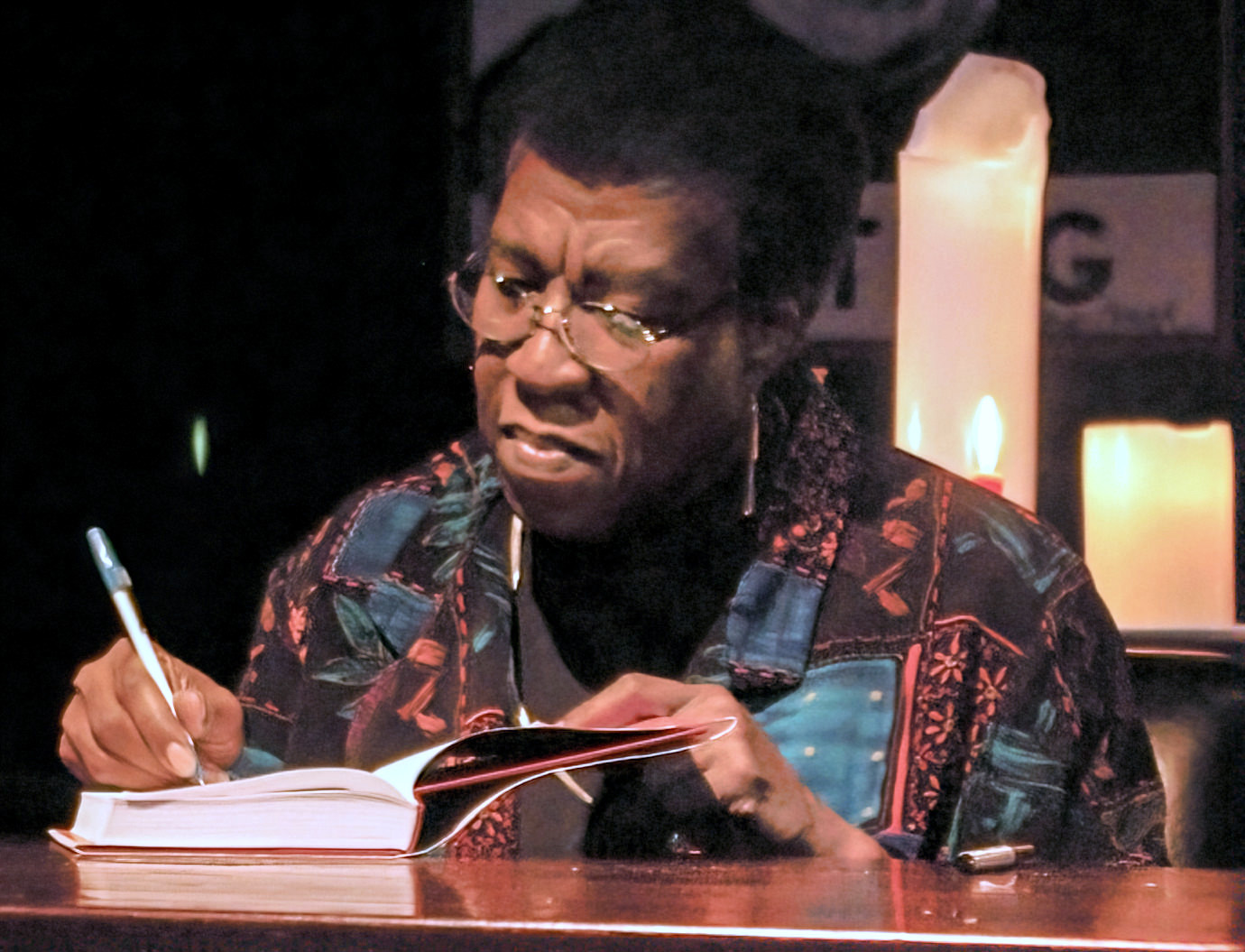
The writer Octavia E. Butler at a book signing in 2005

Jezero Crater was chosen as the 2021 landing site for the Perseverance rover and Ingenuity helicopter as part of the Mars 2020 mission. Thought to have once been flooded with water, the crater contains a fan-delta deposit rich in clays. The lake in the crater was present when valley networks were forming on Mars. Besides having a delta, the crater shows point bars and inverted channels. From a study of the delta and channels, it was concluded that the lake inside the crater probably formed during a period in which there was continual surface runoff. Since it is believed that the lake was long-lived, life may have developed in the crater; the delta may have required a period of one to ten million years to form.

== Octavia E. Butler ==
Octavia Estelle Butler (June 22, 1947 – February 24, 2006) was an African American science fiction author who published a number of novel series between 1976 and 1998. A multiple recipient of both the Hugo and Nebula awards, in 1995 she became the first science-fiction writer to receive a MacArthur Fellowship. (Note: It wasn't until 2020 that another speculative fiction writer (N. K. Jemisin) received the prize.)

Butler published standalone novels, short stories, essays and speeches. She was born in and grew up in Pasadena, California, the location of NASA's Jet Propulsion Laboratory, which manages the Perseverance rover project.

== Gallery ==
Octavia E. Butler Landing

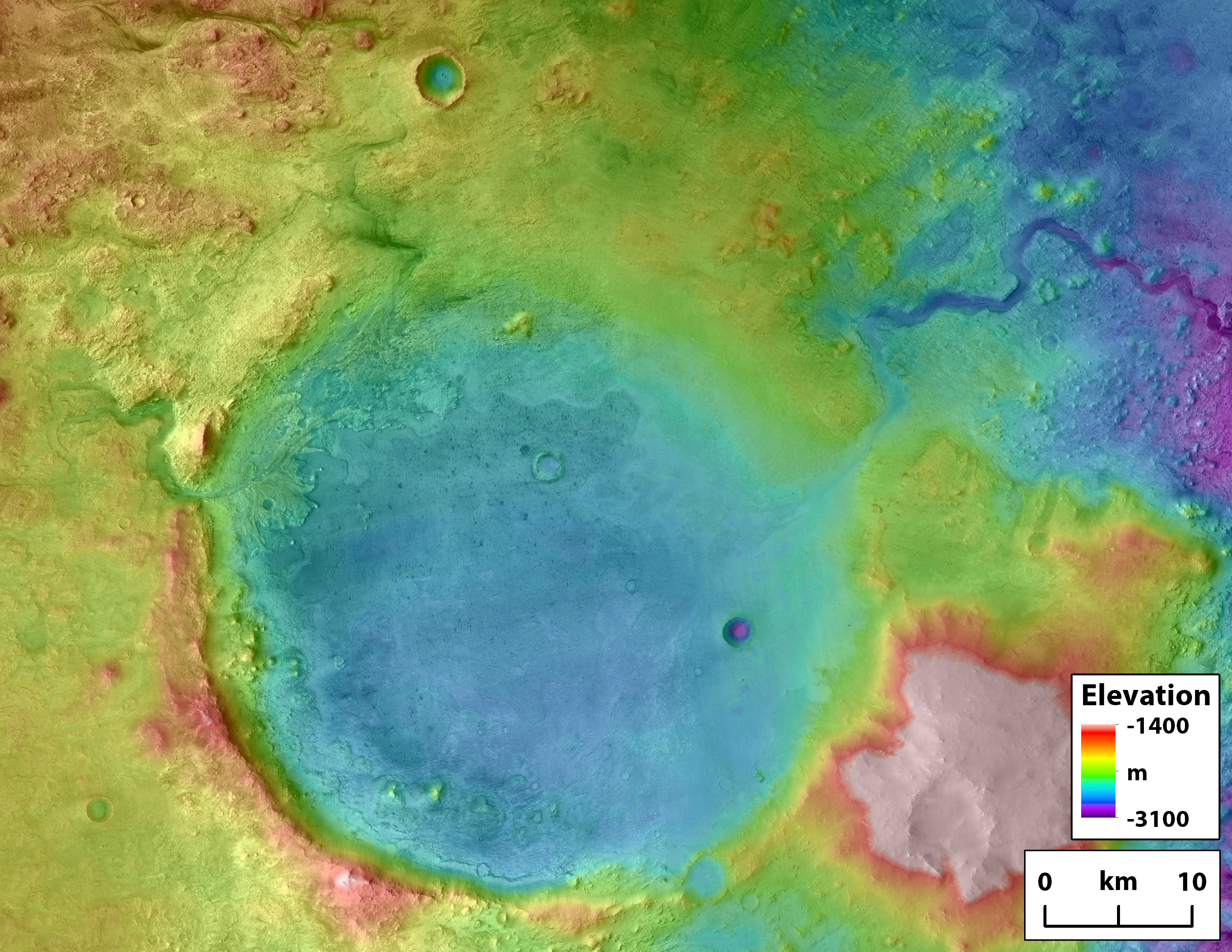
Elevation map of Jezero crater

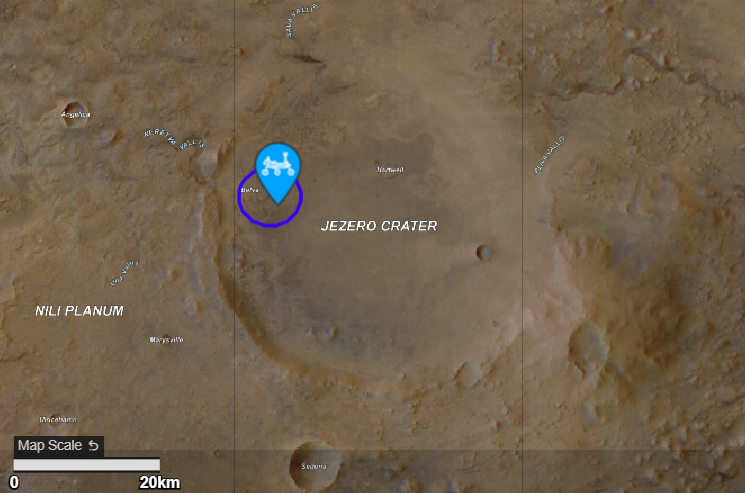
Perseverance rover landing site

Octavia E. Butler Landing viewed by the Perseverance rover.

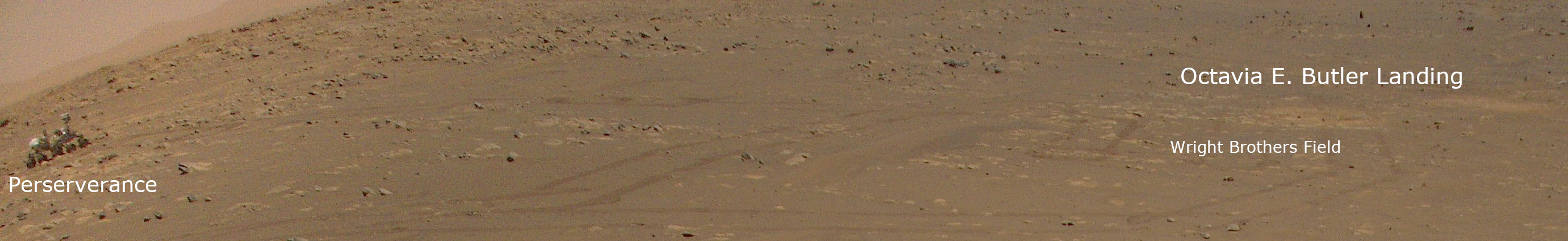
The Ingenuity helicopter views the Perseverance rover (left) about 85 m (279 ft) away from 5.0 m (16.4 ft) in the air (April 25, 2021)

== See also ==
- Bradbury Landing
- List of extraterrestrial memorials
- Perseverance rover landing site
- Timeline of Mars 2020
- Women in speculative fiction
