= SAR-Lupe =

German military reconnaissance satellite system

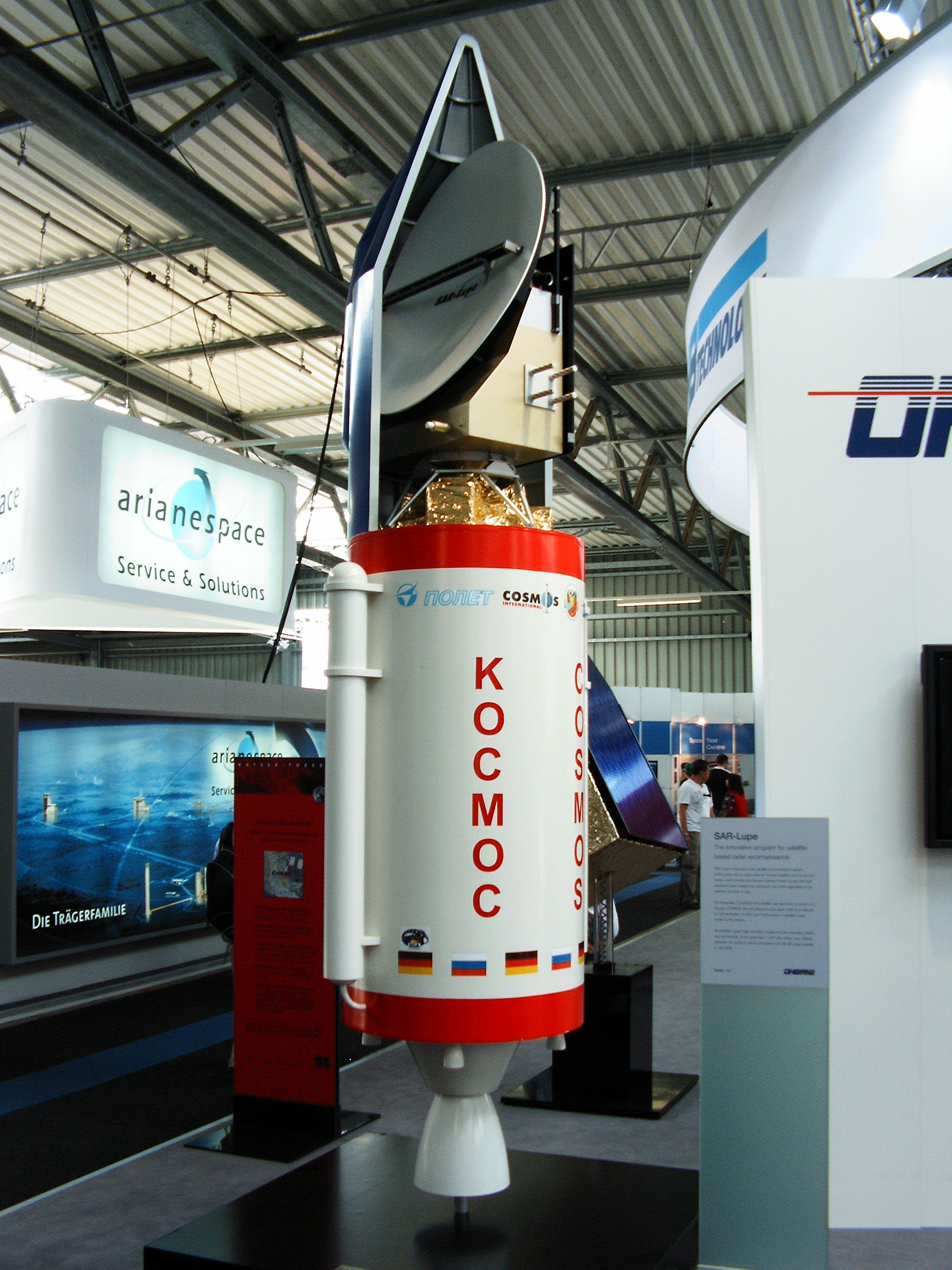
A model of a SAR-Lupe satellite on top of a Russian Kosmos-3M rocket

SAR-Lupe was Germany's first reconnaissance satellite system of Bundeswehr used for military purposes. The program started operation in 2008. Continuous operation of the system has ceased at least since 2020; individual SAR-Lupe satellites have been decommissioned or have already burned up in the atmosphere. It is being completely replaced by the SARah system.

The SAR-Lupe program consisted of five identical (770 kg) miniatur-satellites, developed by the German aeronautics company OHB-System, which were controlled by a ground station. A large data archive of images will be kept in a former Cold War bunker belonging to the Kommando Strategische Aufklärung (Strategic Reconnaissance Command) of the Bundeswehr. The total price of the satellites was over 250 million Euro.

SAR is an abbreviation for synthetic-aperture radar, and "Lupe" is German for magnifying glass.

== Specifications ==
SAR-Lupe's "high-resolution" images can be acquired day or night through all weather conditions. The satellites are able to provide up-to-date imagery from almost all regions of the world.

The first satellite was launched from Plesetsk in Russia on 19 December 2006, about a year after the intended launch date; four more satellites were launched at roughly six-month intervals, and the entire system achieved full operational readiness on 22 July 2008. The constellation is planned for 10 years of operational life.

The five satellites operate in three 500-kilometre orbits in planes roughly 60° apart. They use an X-band radar with a 3-metre dish, providing a resolution of about 50 centimetres over a frame size of 5.5 km on a side ("spotlight mode", in which the satellite rotates to keep the dish pointed at a single target) or about 1 metre over a frame size of 8 km × 60 km ("stripmap mode", in which the satellite maintains a fixed orientation over the Earth, and the radar image is formed simply by the satellite's motion along its orbit). Response time for imaging of a given area is 10 hours or less. Thales Alenia Space provided the core of the synthetic-aperture radar sensors.

== History ==
The SAR-Lupe satellites are the first German military satellites.

The testing of SAR-Lupe involved an inverse procedure, in which the satellite, mounted in a radome on Earth, was used to image the International Space Station, whose orbit is reasonably close to the one the satellite will eventually be in. One-metre resolution at the ISS was apparently achieved.

On 30 July 2002 a cooperation treaty between Germany and France was signed, under which the SAR-Lupe satellites and the French Helios optical reconnaissance satellite will operate jointly. Other EU countries have been invited to join as well, and Italy has shown considerable interest.

== Radar component ==
XSAR of SAR-Lupe is observing in X-band (center frequency of 9.65 GHz corresponding to a wavelength of 3.1 cm).

- Global observation coverage capability.
- Use of a parabolic SAR reflector antenna of 3.3 m × 2.7 m size. The choice of using a single-beam offset reflector antenna instead of an active beam-steering antenna represented a major cost saving in the development of the instrument. SAR-Lupe uses a single-beam offset reflector antenna and a travelling-wave tube (TWT) transmitter, illuminated by a feed horn on a deployable boom. The highly efficient TWT and a low-loss high-gain antenna are providing good power potential for radar with efficient DC power utilization.

Prior to an image acquisition, the satellite rolls in an appropriate position and stabilizes its attitude. Then, the SAR image is acquired. After that, the satellite rolls back into its standby attitude and continues to charge its batteries, preparing itself for the next SAR image acquisition.

- Number of scenes of area of interest: ≥ 30/day.
- System response time: < 36 hours.
- System availability: 95%.
- Automated monitoring and control of the constellation via a ground control station.
- Automated data reception and image processing.
- LEOP (launch and early orbit phase) support is provided by DLR/GSOC.
- The mean response time of the system is in the range of 10 hours. System availability is provided by the distribution of the satellites in their orbital planes.
- The modular interface design of the ground segment permits also future integration into an international reconnaissance network (mutual utilization of the system, etc.).
- SAR imaging modes provided: stripmap and spotlight. Stripmap imaging involves antenna pointing into a fixed direction (normally in cross-track). Internally, these modes are referred to as “Strip-SAR” and “Slip-SAR”. Strip-SAR observations are conducted in the nadir direction. In Slip-SAR mode, the entire spacecraft is rotated into the direction of the target to increase the integration time and therefore the in-track resolution.
- Spatial resolution of SAR data: 0.5 m in spotlight mode for a scene of about 5.5 km × 5.5 km in size; a stripmap scene has a size of 60 km × 8 km. It can provide NESZ (noise equivalent sigma naught) range up to −19.91 dB.
- Satellite operations permit “spotlight imaging” of a scene. This involves rotation of the entire spacecraft about a target area to increase the integration time of the scene (the SAR beacon is pointable). In SAR-Lupe terminology, spotlight imaging is referred to as “Slip-SAR”.
- An onboard image storage capability of 128 Gbit (EOL) is provided.
- The main image products are: 1) stripmap scenes of size 60 km × 8 km, and 2) square scenes of 5.5 km × 5.5 km in size.
- The following additional products can also be generated: a) elevation models from multipass interferometric products, b) multipass stereo products, c) change detection products, d) products with enhanced radiometric resolution.

== Launches ==
Satellite	COSPAR	Date	Carrier rocket	Launch site	Launch status
SAR-Lupe-1	2006-060A	19 December 2006	Cosmos-3M	Plesetsk	Success
SAR-Lupe-2	2007-030A	2 July 2007	Cosmos-3M	Plesetsk	Success
SAR-Lupe-3	2007-053A	1 November 2007	Cosmos-3M	Plesetsk	Success
SAR-Lupe-4	2008-014A	27 March 2008	Cosmos-3M	Plesetsk	Success
SAR-Lupe-5	2008-036A	22 July 2008	Cosmos-3M	Plesetsk	Success
SARah-1	2022-063A	18 June 2022	Falcon 9 Block 5	Vandenberg SLC-4E	Success
SARah-2	2023-204_	24 December 2023	Falcon 9 Block 5	Vandenberg SLC-4E	Success
SARah-3	2023-204_	24 December 2023	Falcon 9 Block 5	Vandenberg SLC-4E	Success

== Contractors ==
- Prime contractor: OHB-System
- LSE Space Engineering & Operations AG

== Future ==
A replacement of SAR-Lupe, called SARah, entered service starting from 2023. It consists of 3 radar satellites. The SARah satellites are bigger and more capable than those of SAR-Lupe. SARah-1, a phased-array-antenna satellite, launched on Falcon 9 Block 5 on 18 June 2022. SARah-2 and SARah-3, passive-antenna synthetic aperture radar satellites built by OHB SE, were launched on Falcon 9 on 24 December 2023. Both satellites experienced antenna deployment failures after launch, rendering them inoperable. As a result, Bundeswehr officials state that OHB is responsible for building two replacement satellites. After extensive maneuvers the atennas could be deployed and SARah is now fully functional. However the replacement satellites are still being built as an addition.

== See also ==
- Paz, Spain's SAR satellite.
- SAOCOM, two Argentine SAR-satellites.
- COSMO-SkyMed, a system of four military and civil SAR-satellites of Italy
- TerraSAR-X, a civilian German radar satellite
- European Union Satellite Centre
