= Manfred Fuchs =

Italian space entrepreneur (1938–2014)

- Born: 25 July 1938; Latsch, Italy
- Died: 26 April 2014 (aged 75); Kaltern an der Weinstraße, Italy
- Scientific career
- Institutions: Founder of the German space company OHB

Manfred Fuchs (25 July 1938 in Latsch, Italy – 26 April 2014 in Kaltern an der Weinstraße) was an Italian-German entrepreneur who was the founder of the German space company OHB.

== Biography ==
Fuchs' family owned distilleries in Alto Adige, the brewery forest near Merano, which is still family-owned, also sawmills and wine trade. His father also owned a trucking company and a restaurant.

He attended trade school in Bolzano, studied at the Polytechnic School of Munich, and from 1957 at the Engineering School Hamburg. He graduated as an engineer in aerospace engineering in 1959. He worked as a development engineer at Hamburger Flugzeugbau. From 1961, Fuchs worked in Bremen at the aerospace company ERNO, an EADS predecessor. There he became group leader in 1965, later head of Department Astro Dynamics / Preliminary Development and Director of Department in 1982. Fuchs was involved in the Ariane-1, Columbus and Spacelab projects.

=== OHB System ===
In 1981, Manfred Fuchs, along with his wife Christa, who initially owned the shares, became involved with Otto Hydraulic Bremen (OHB), a small company situated in Hemelinger port specializing in hydraulic and electrical engineering works. At the time, OHB had a modest workforce of five employees and primarily serviced the German forces Bundeswehr. By 1985, following his departure from ERNO, Fuchs assumed full control of OHB, steering the company towards satellite technology and aerospace engineering. Among its early ventures, OHB manufactured components for the Airbus A380 aircraft.

Under Fuchs' leadership, the company experienced significant growth, expanding its workforce to approximately 1,600 employees by 2009. OHB established its headquarters in the Technology Park adjacent to the University of Bremen, aligning itself closely with the academic and research community. The firm notably contributed to military reconnaissance efforts, supplying the Bundeswehr with its first own satellites, the SAR-Lupe reconnaissance system, and also provided satellite data to Frontex, the European Border and Coast Guard Agency.

By 2009, OHB had achieved a turnover of 320 million Euros, positioning itself as the third-largest aerospace group in Europe, trailing only behind EADS and Thales Group. The acronym OHB, which stands for high-technology Bremen orbitals since 2000, reflects the company's dedication to pioneering space technology. Manfred Fuchs played a pivotal role in the company's ascent, serving as its chairman. Ownership of OHB remained largely within the Fuchs family, holding approximately 70% of the company shares, even as it transitioned to a publicly traded entity.

In 2010, the company was awarded the contract for the construction of satellites for the Galileo project, a European GPS system and the contract for the European Meteosat project. The subsidiary MT Aerospace in Augsburg, the Fuchs Group, is the largest German supplier for the Ariane rocket.

== Awards and tributes ==
- 1995: Bremer Entrepreneur of the Year
- 1996: Honorary Professor of the Bremen University of Applied Sciences
- 2005: Honorary Doctor of the Polytechnic University of Milan
- 2009: Honorary citizen and supporter of the University of Bremen
- 2011: Werner von Siemens Ring
- 2014: Manfred Memorial Moon Mission
