= Chang'e 5 =

Chinese lunar exploration mission

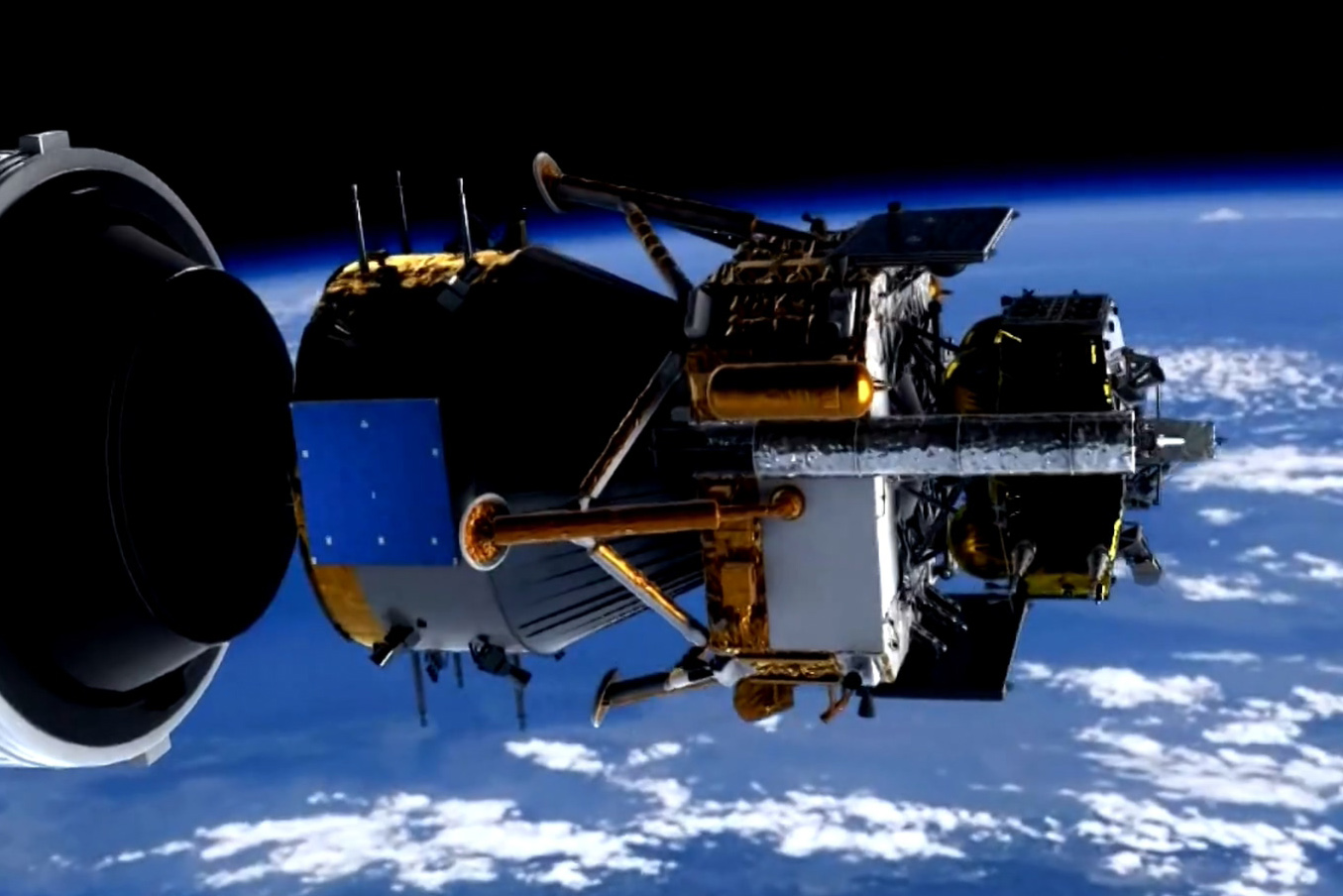
- Chang'e 5 probe separating from the launcher (artist's impression)
- Mission type: Lunar sample return
- Operator: CNSA
- COSPAR ID: 2020-087A
- SATCAT no.: 47097
- Mission duration: Elapsed: 5 years, 11 months, 22 days

Spacecraft properties
- Manufacturer: CAST
- Launch mass: 8,200 kg

Start of mission
- Launch date: 23 November 2020; 20:30:12 UTC; 24 November 2020; 04:30 CST
- Rocket: Long March 5
- Launch site: Wenchang
- Contractor: CALT

End of mission
- Landing date: 16 December 2020; 17:59 UTC; Return capsule
- Landing site: Inner Mongolia, China

Lunar orbiter
- Orbital insertion: 28 November 2020; 12:58 UTC

Orbital parameters
- Periapsis altitude: 200 km (120 mi)

Lunar lander
- Landing date: 1 December 2020; 15:11 UTC
- Return launch: 3 December 2020; 15:10 UTC
- Landing site: Mons Rümker, region of Oceanus Procellarum; 43.0576°N 51.9161°W
- Sample mass: 1,731 g (61.1 oz)

Docking with Sample Ascender
- Docking date: 5 December 2020, 21:42:00 UTC
- Undocking date: 7 December 2020, 04:35:00 UTC

Flyby of Moon
- Spacecraft component: orbiter
- Closest approach: ~9 September 2021

Chang'e 5
- Simplified Chinese: 嫦娥五号
- Traditional Chinese: 嫦娥五號
Transcriptions
Standard Mandarin
- Hanyu Pinyin: Cháng'é wǔhào

Chang'e 5 (Chinese: 嫦娥五号; pinyin: Cháng'é wǔhào (Note: In Standard Chinese, it is pronounced as Cháng'é. Alternatively pronounced and spelled like Chang-Er in Malaysian Chinese.)) was the fifth lunar exploration mission in the Chinese Lunar Exploration Program of CNSA, and China's first lunar sample-return mission. The spacecraft pair launched on 23 November 2020, atop a Long March 5 rocket from Wenchang Space Launch Site on Hainan Island, landed on the Moon on 1 December, collected ~1731 g (61.1 oz) of lunar samples (including from a core ~1 m deep), and returned to the Earth on 16 December. Like its predecessors, the spacecraft is named after the Chinese moon goddess, Chang'e.

Chang'e 5 was the first lunar sample return since the Soviet Union's Luna 24 in 1976. China became the third country to achieve this, after the US (Apollo 11) and USSR (Luna 16). The mission used four component modules, a Lander/Ascender pair and an Orbiter/Returner pair. The Ascender conducted the first ever robotic lunar orbit docking, with the Orbiter/Returner, and the eighth lunar orbit docking overall, following seven under the US Apollo program. Chang'e 5-T1, launched in 2014, verified the return capsule and lunar orbit rendezvous technologies. CNSA conducted the similar Chang'e 6 mission in 2024, sampling the far side of the Moon.

The lunar samples led Chinese scientists to discover Changesite-(Y) and two structures of the titanium compound Ti_{2}O, the sixth, seventh, and eighth minerals discovered on the Moon. China also provided open access to the samples for a consortium of scientists from Australia, US, UK, and Sweden, hailed as a science diplomacy success.

== Overview ==
The Chinese Lunar Exploration Program has four phases, with incremental technological advancement:

- Phase one: orbiting the Moon, completed by Chang'e 1 in 2007 and Chang'e 2 in 2010.
- Phase two: soft landing and deploying rover on the Moon, completed by Chang'e 3 (2013) and Chang'e 4 (launched in December 2018, landed on the far side of the Moon in January 2019).
- Phase three: returning lunar samples, completed by Chang'e 5. The backup of Chang'e 5, the Chang'e 6 mission, is also a lunar sample-return mission.
- Phase four: in-situ resource utilization, and constructing an International Lunar Research Station near the lunar south pole.

The Chinese Lunar Exploration Program plan to lead to crewed missions in the 2030s.

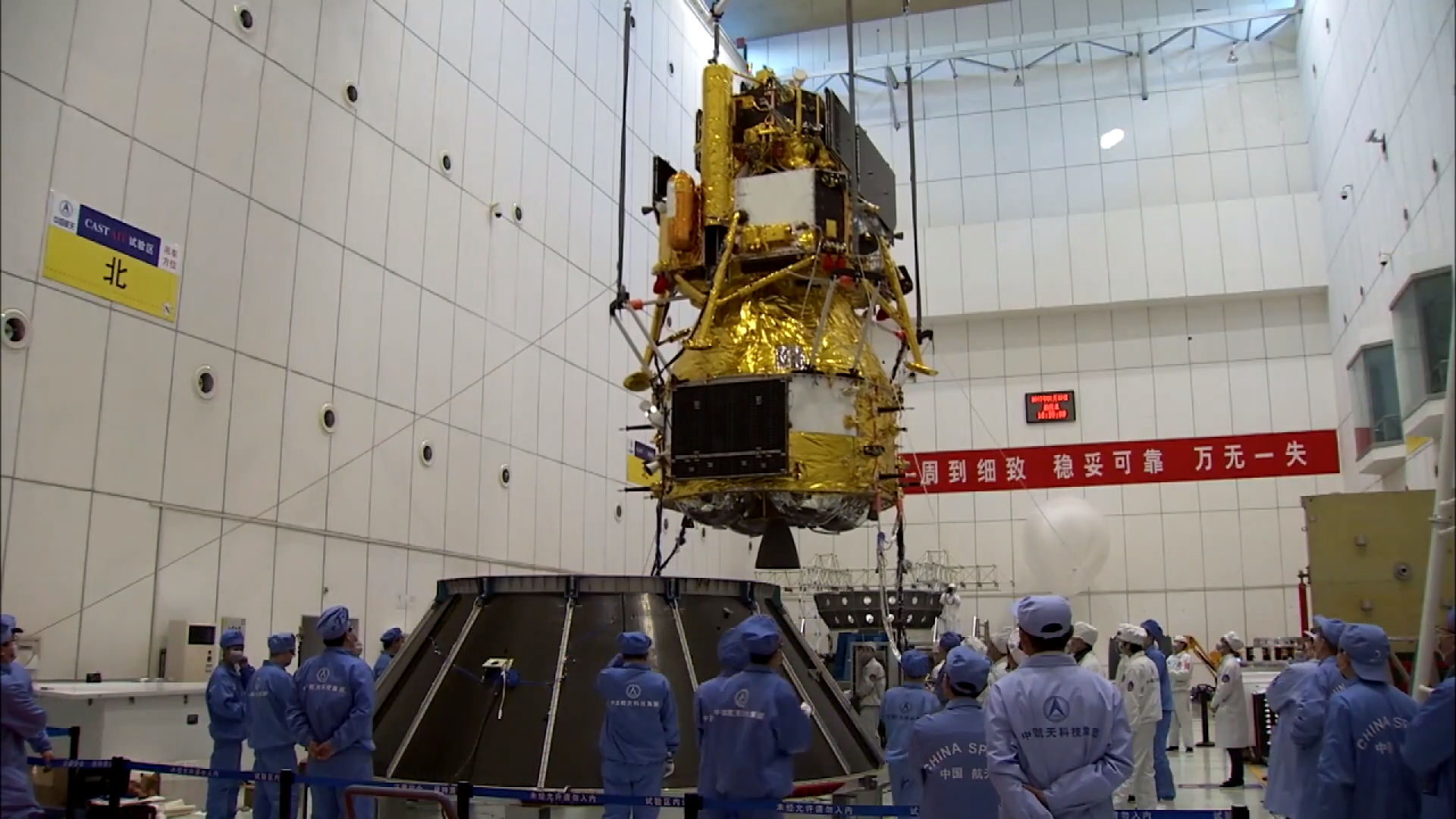
The Chang'e 5 Lander and Orbiter Combination assembly factory test.

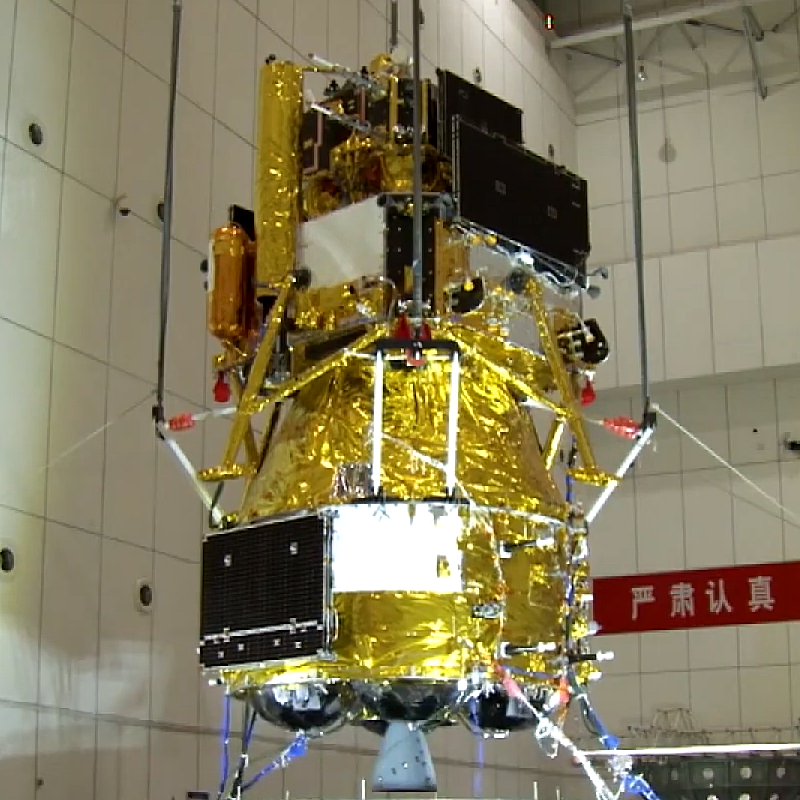
Chang'e 5 in testing phase

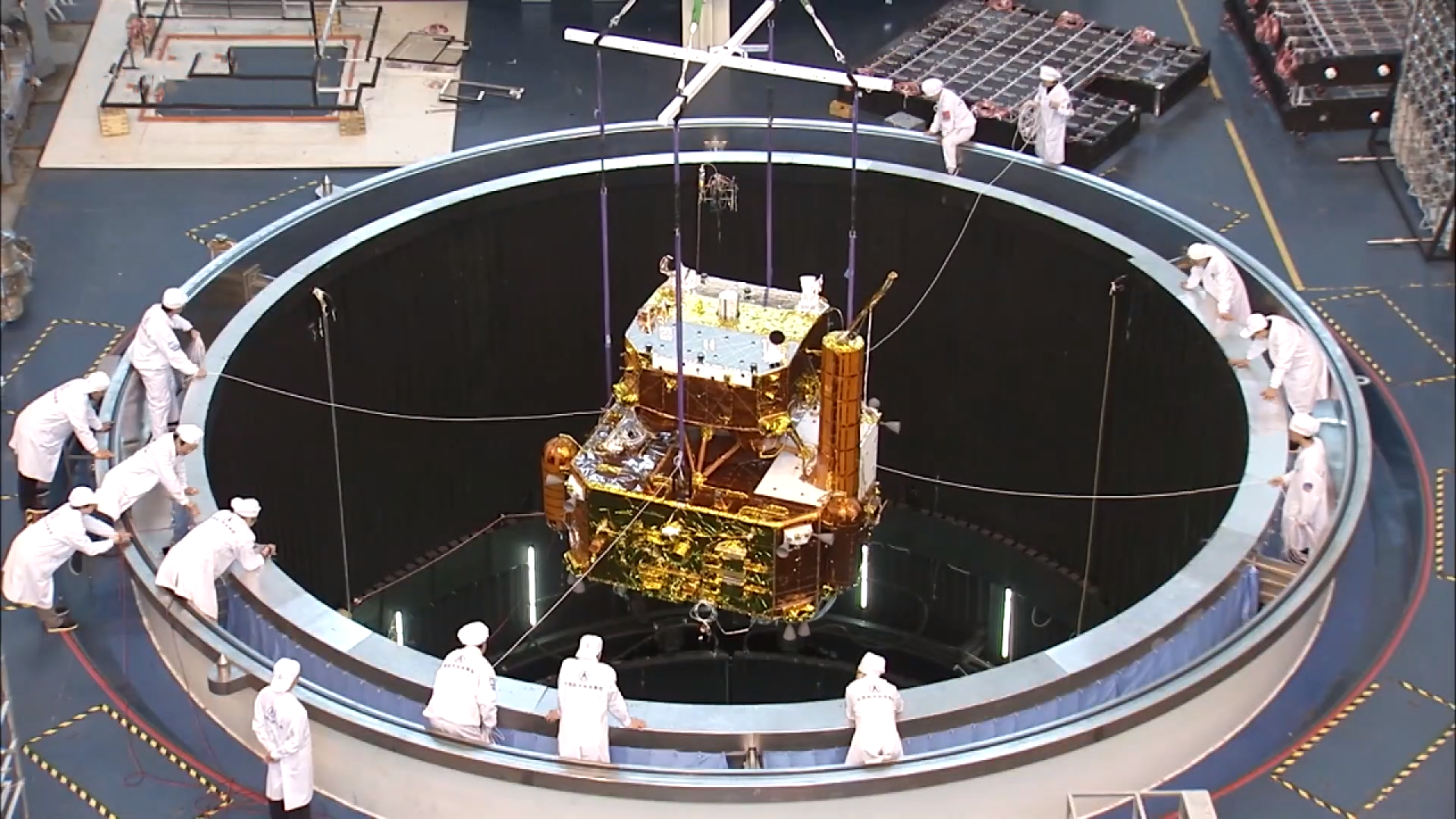
The Chang'e 5 ascender testing

== Equipment ==
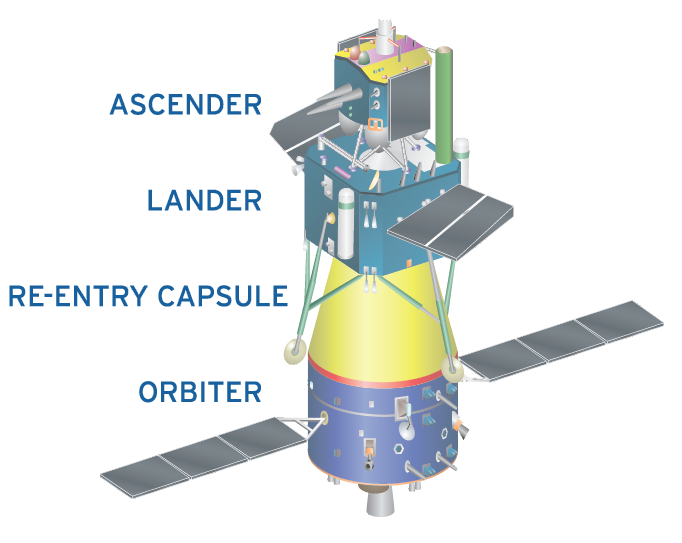
Chang'e 5 launch configuration (from top): Ascender (Ascent stage) Lander (Lunar lander) Re-Entry Capsule (Earth lander) Orbiter (Orbital vehicle)

=== Components ===
The Chang'e 5 mission consists of four modules or components:

- Lander: landed on the lunar surface after separating from the Orbiter, installed with a drill and a scooping device. The Ascender is on the top of the Lander.
- Ascender: after sampling, the lunar samples were transported to a container within the Ascender. The Ascender launched from the lunar surface at 15:11 UTC, on 3 December 2020, followed by automatic lunar orbit rendezvous and docking with the Orbiter. After transferring the sample, the Ascender separated from the Orbiter, deorbited, and fell back down on the Moon at 22:49 UTC, on 6 December 2020, to avoid becoming space debris.
- Orbiter: after the samples were transported from the Ascender to the Orbiter, the Orbiter left lunar orbit and spent ~4.5 days flying back to Earth orbit and released the Returner (reentry capsule) just before arrival.
- Returner: The Returner performed a skip reentry to bounce off the atmosphere once before formal reentering.

The four components were launched together and flew to the Moon as a combined unit. After reaching lunar orbit (14:58 UTC, on 28 November 2020), the Lander/Ascender separated from the Orbiter/Returner modules (20:40 UTC, on 29 November 2020), and descended to the surface of the Moon (15:13 UTC, on 1 December 2020). After samples had been collected, the Ascender separated from the Lander (15:11 UTC, on 3 December 2020), lifted off to the Orbiter/Returner, docked with them, and transferred the samples to the Returner. The Ascender then separated from the Orbiter/Returner and crashed on the Moon (~30°S in latitude and 0° in longitude) at 22:49 UTC, on 8 December 2020. The Orbiter/Returner then returned to the Earth, where the Returner separated and descended to the surface of the Earth at 17:59 UTC, on 16 December 2020.

The estimated launch mass of Chang'e 5 was 8,200 kg (18,100 lb), the Lander was projected to be 3,200 kg (7,100 lb), and Ascender was about 700 kg (1,500 lb). Unlike Chang'e 4, which was equipped with a radioisotope heater unit to survive the extreme cold of lunar night, the Lander of Chang'e 5 stopped functioning in the following lunar night.

=== Scientific payloads ===
Chang'e 5 included four scientific payloads, including a Landing Camera, a Panoramic Camera, a Lunar Mineralogical Spectrometer, and a Lunar Regolith Penetrating Radar. Chang'e 5 collected samples using two methods, i.e., drilling for subsurface samples and scooping for surface samples. The scooping device was developed by The Hong Kong Polytechnic University, consisting of Sampler A, Sampler B, Near-field Cameras, and Sealing and Packaging System.

== Mission profile ==
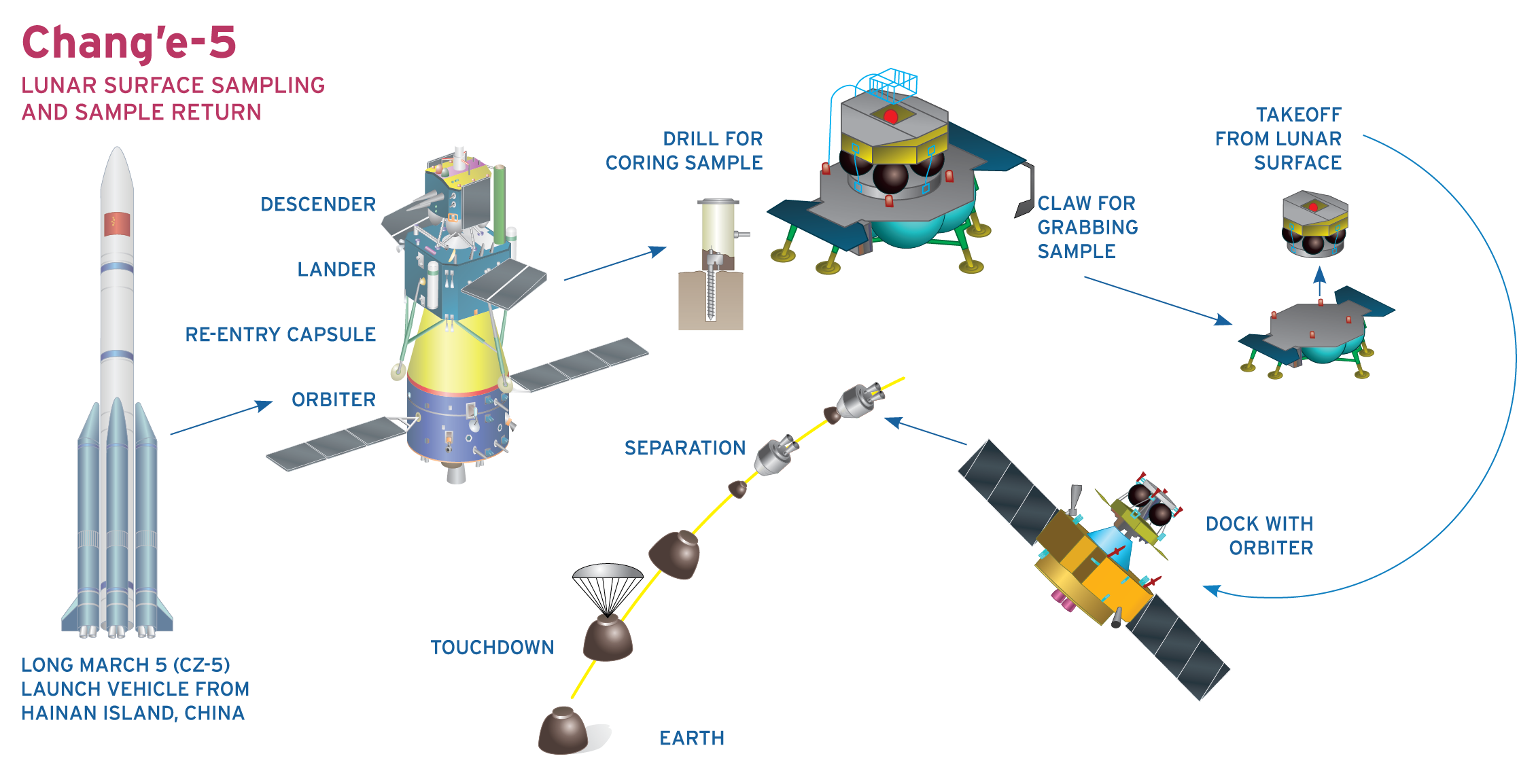
Chang'e-5 mission profile

Sample-return mission

Chang'e 5 launch

Chang'e 5 returning

Chang'e 5 23 days mission

=== Launch ===
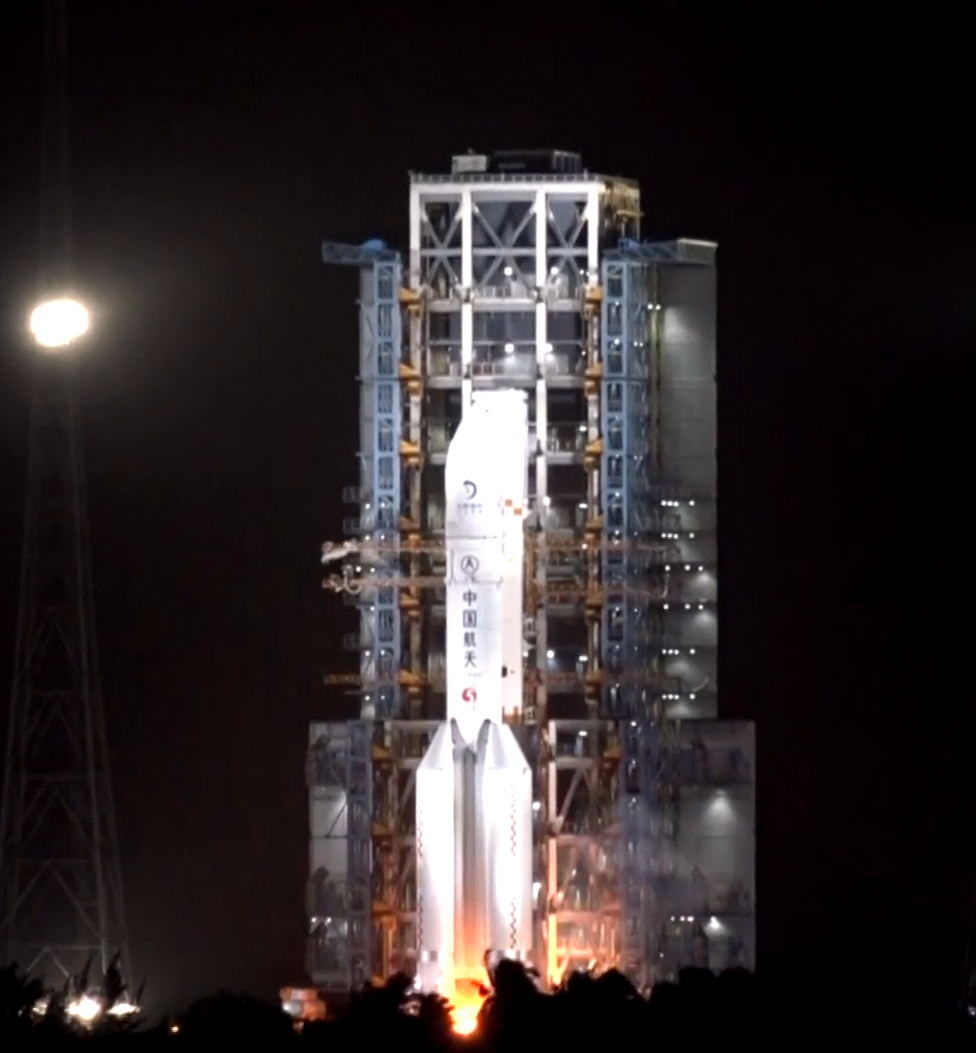
Chang'e 5 was launched by a Long March 5 Y-5 launch vehicle from Wenchang Spacecraft Launch Site.

Chang'e 5 was planned to be launched in November 2017 by the Long March 5 rocket. However, a July 2017 failure of the referenced carrier rocket forced a delay on the original schedule two times until the end of 2020. On 27 December 2019, the Long March 5 successfully returned to service, thereby allowing the current mission to proceed after the Tianwen-1 mission. The Chang'e 5 probe was launched at 20:30 UTC, on 23 November 2020, by a Long March 5 Y-5 launch vehicle from the Wenchang Spacecraft Launch Site on Hainan Island.

=== Earth–Moon Transfer ===
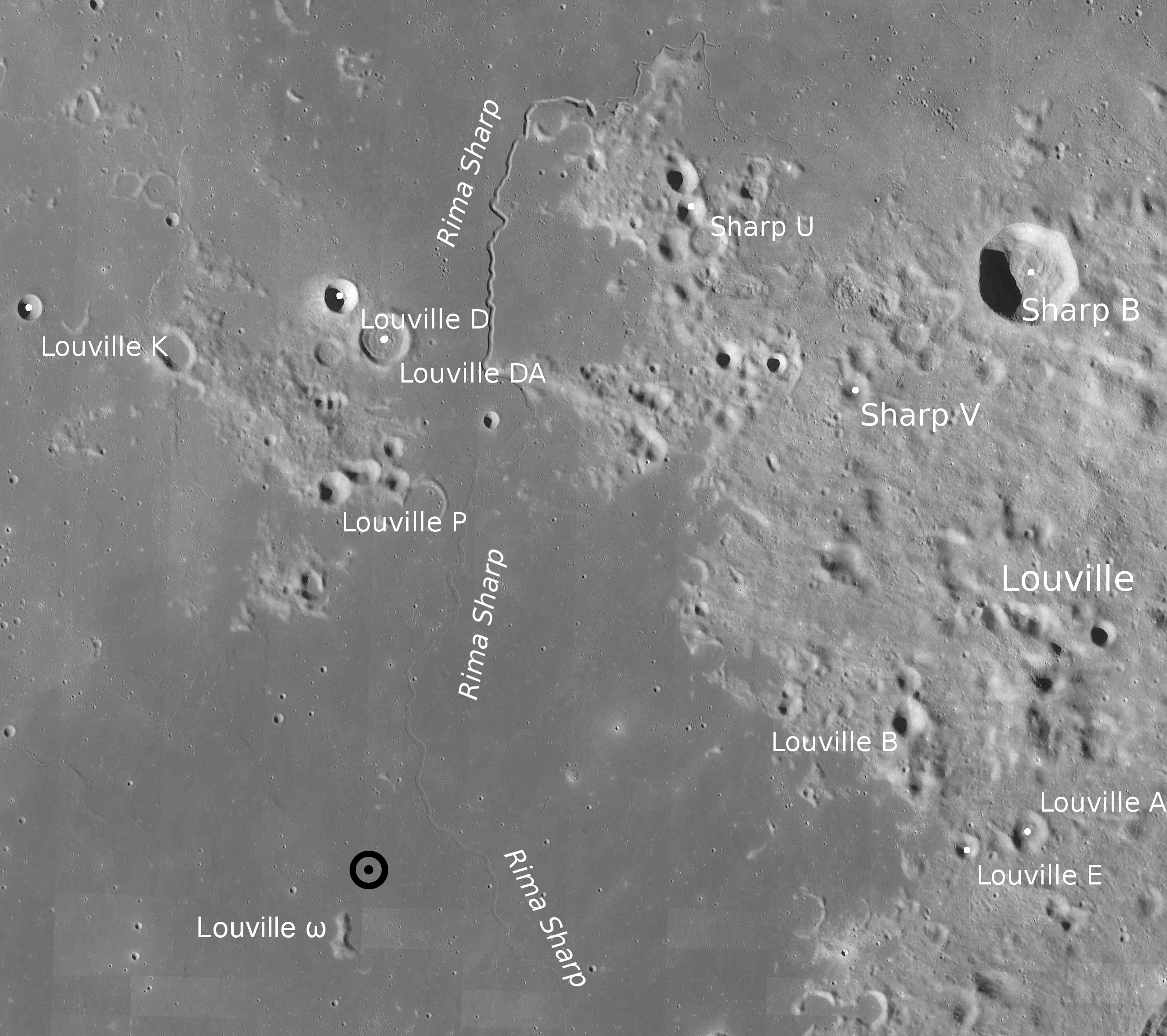
Landing site of Chang'e 5 near the Louville Omega hill (Louville ω, from the nearby Louville crater)

After launch, Chang'e 5 applied its first orbital correction at 14:06 UTC, on 24 November 2020, second orbital correction at 14:06 UTC, on 25 November 2020, entered lunar orbit at 14:58 UTC, on 28 November 2020 (elliptical orbital), adjusted its orbit to a circular orbit at 12:23 UTC, on 29 November 2020, and the Lander/Ascender separated from the Orbiter/Returner at 20:10 UTC, on 29 November 2020, in preparation for landing.

=== Landing site ===
The Lander/Ascender landed on the Moon on 1 December 2020, at 15:11 UTC. The Chang'e 5 landing site is at 43.1°N (in latitude), 51.8°W (in longitude) in the Northern Oceanus Procellarum near a huge volcanic complex, Mons Rümker, located in the northwest lunar near side. The area is mapped as 'Eratosthenian Mare' by the USGS. The Chang'e 5 landing site, named Statio Tianchuan, is within the Procellarum KREEP Terrain, with elevated heat-producing elements, thin crust, and prolonged volcanism. This area is characterized by some of the youngest mare basalts on the Moon (~1.21 billion years old), with elevated titanium, thorium, and olivine abundances, which have never been sampled by the American Apollo program and the Soviet Luna programme.

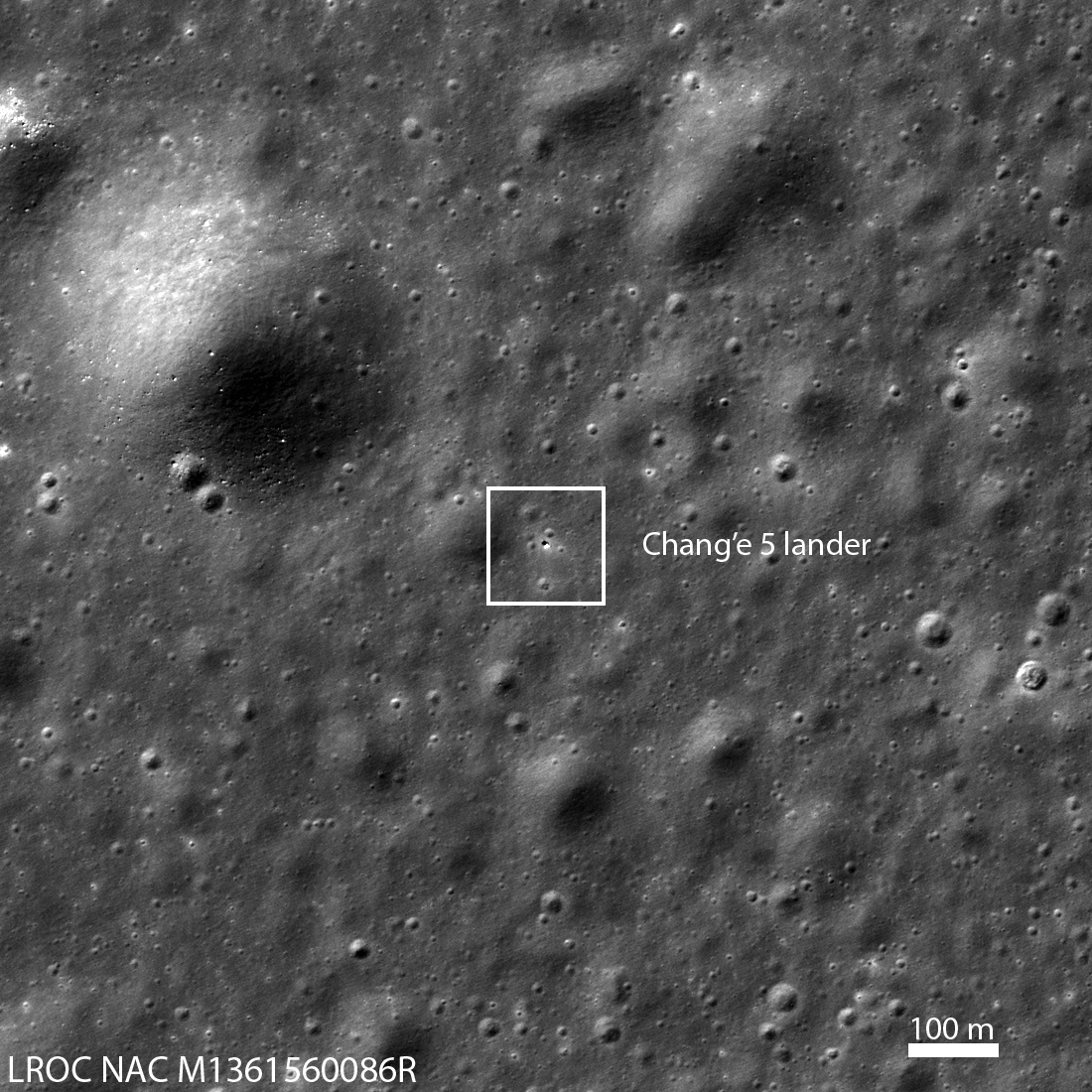
Photograph of the Chang'e 5 lander on the surface of the Moon taken by the NASA Lunar Reconnaissance Orbiter

=== Back to Earth ===
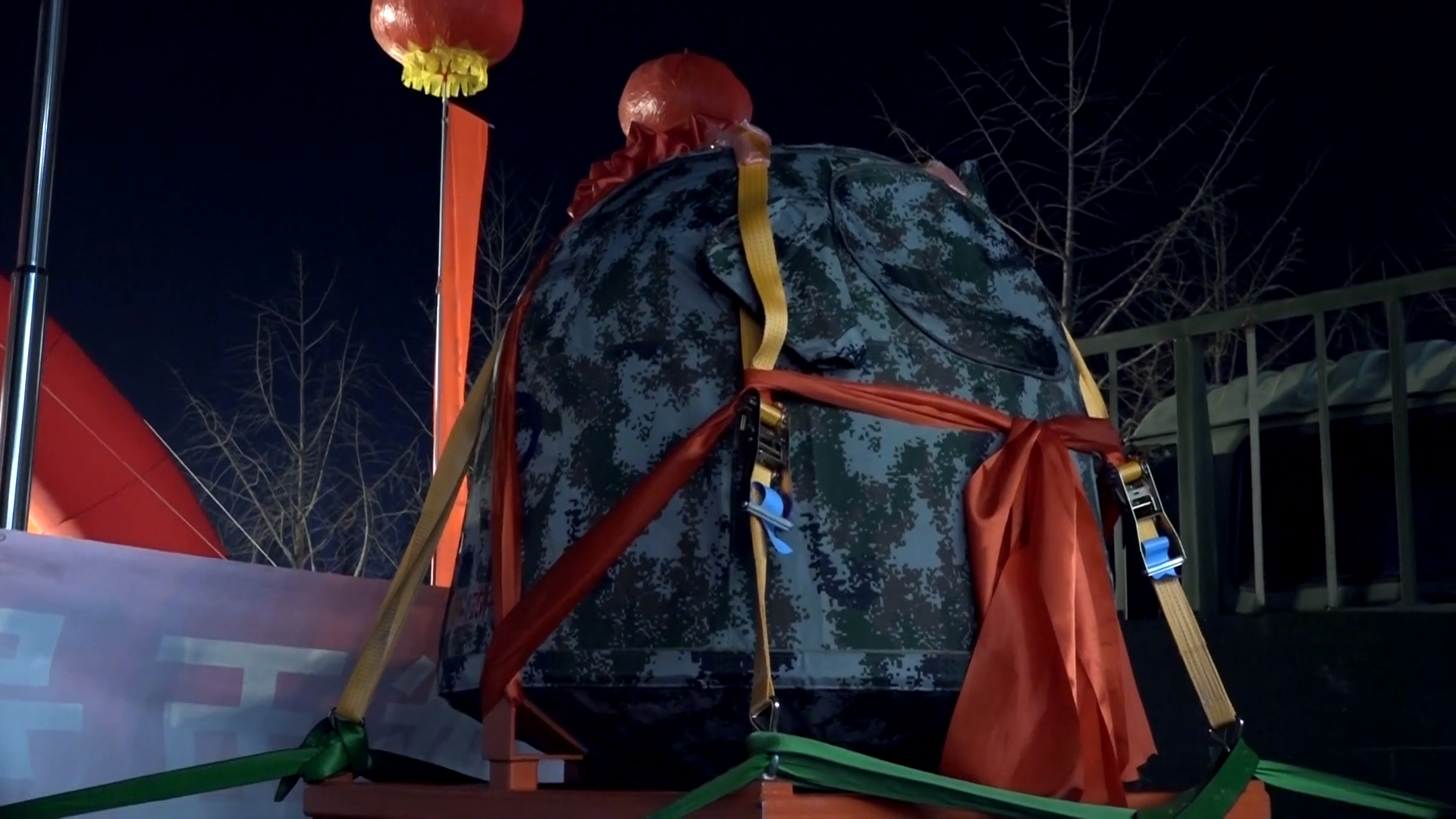
Chang'e 5 return capsule transported back to CAST, where the sample container was unsealed

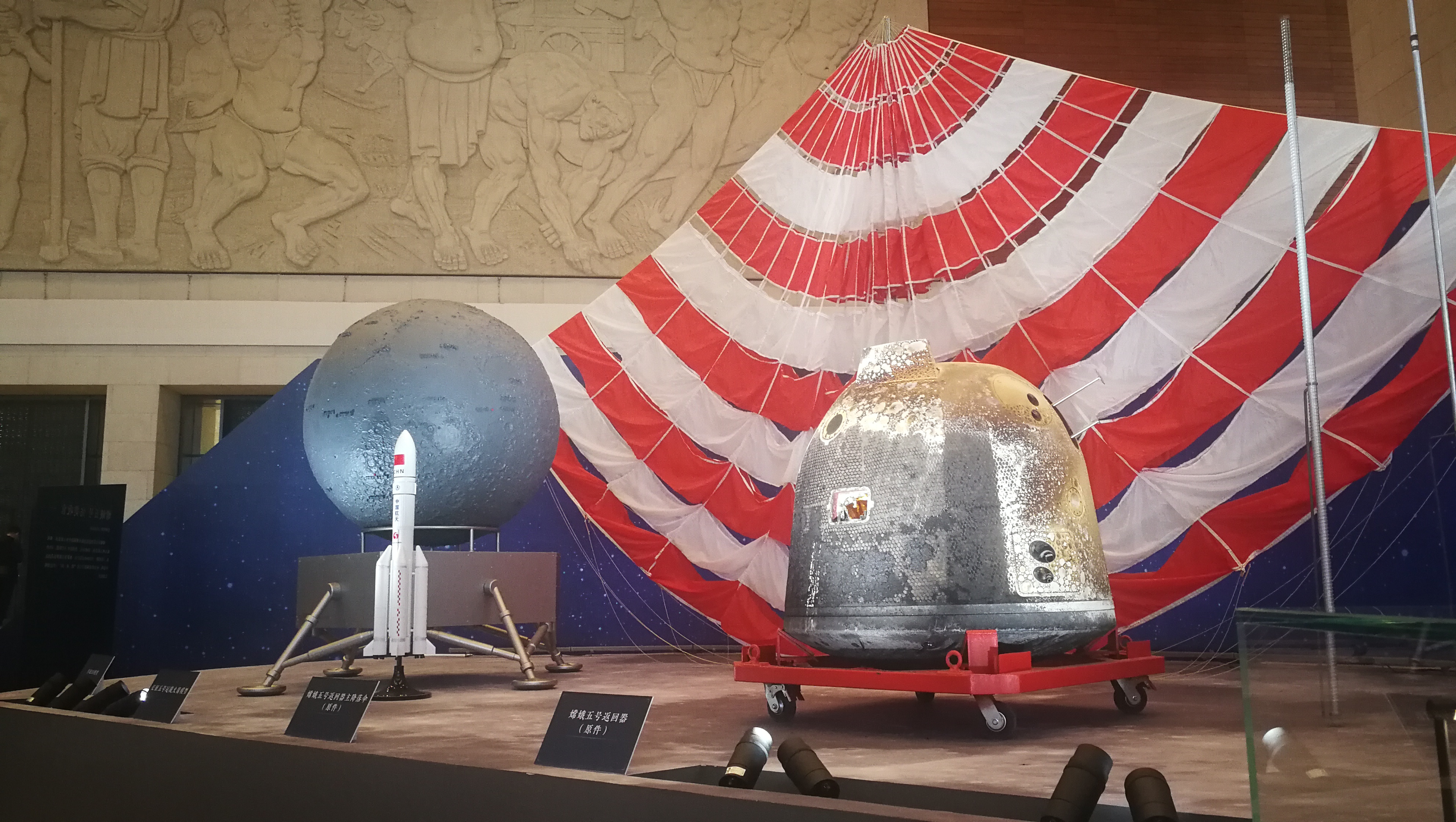
The return capsule and main parachute of Chang'e 5, on temporary exhibit in National Museum of China

The Chang'e 5 Ascender lifted off from Oceanus Procellarum at 15:10 UTC, on 3 December 2020, and six minutes later, arrived in lunar orbit. The Ascender docked with the Orbiter/Returner combination in lunar orbit on 5 December 2020, at 21:42 UTC, and the samples were transferred to the return capsule at 22:12 UTC. The Ascender separated from the Orbiter/Returner combination on 6 December 2020, at 04:35 UTC. After completing its role of the mission, the Ascender was commanded to deorbit on 7 December 2020, at 22:59 UTC, and crashed into the Moon's surface at 23:30 UTC, in the area of (~30°S, 0°E). On 13 December 2020, at 01:51 UTC, from a distance of 230 kilometers from the lunar surface, the Orbiter and Returner successfully fired four engines to enter the Moon-Earth Hohmann transfer orbit.

The electronics and systems on the Chang'e 5 lunar lander were expected to cease working on 11 December 2020, due to the Moon's extreme cold and lack of a radioisotope heater unit. However, engineers were also prepared for the possibility that the Chang'e 5 lander could be damaged and stop working after acting as the launchpad for the ascender module on 3 December 2020, as turned out to be the case.

On 16 December 2020, at around 18:00 UTC, the roughly 300 kg (660 lb) return capsule performed a ballistic skip reentry, in effect bouncing off the atmosphere over the Arabian Sea before re-entry. The capsule, containing around 2 kg (4.4 lb) of drilled and scooped lunar material, landed in the grasslands of Siziwang Banner in the Ulanqab region of south central Inner Mongolia. Surveillance drones spotted the Returner capsule prior to its touchdown, and recovery vehicles located the capsule shortly afterwards.

The next day, it was reported that Chang'e 5's service module had performed an atmospheric re-entry avoidance burn and had been on-course to an Earth–Sun L1 Lagrange point orbit as a part of its extended mission.

=== Extended mission ===
After dropping off the return samples for Earth, the Chang'e 5 (CE-5) orbiter was successfully captured by the Sun-Earth L1 Lagrange point at 5:39 UTC, on 15 March 2021, and became the first Chinese spacecraft to orbit the Sun–Earth L1 Lagrange point. The distance at the time of capture was about 936,700 kilometers from Earth and the orbiter entered an orbit with a period of about 6 months. On its 88-day journey to L1, mission control conducted 2 orbital maneuvers and 2 trajectory correction maneuvers. It made a lunar flyby in an extended mission on 9 September 2021.

In January 2022, CE-5 left the L1 point for the lunar distant retrograde orbit (DRO) to conduct very-long-baseline interferometry tests in preparation for the next stage of China's Lunar Exploration Program. According to The Space Review (TSR), this maneuver was depicted in Chinese government and academic documents. In February 2022, multiple amateur satellite trackers observed that CE-5 had entered DRO, making it the first spacecraft in history to utilize the orbit.

== Lunar sample research ==
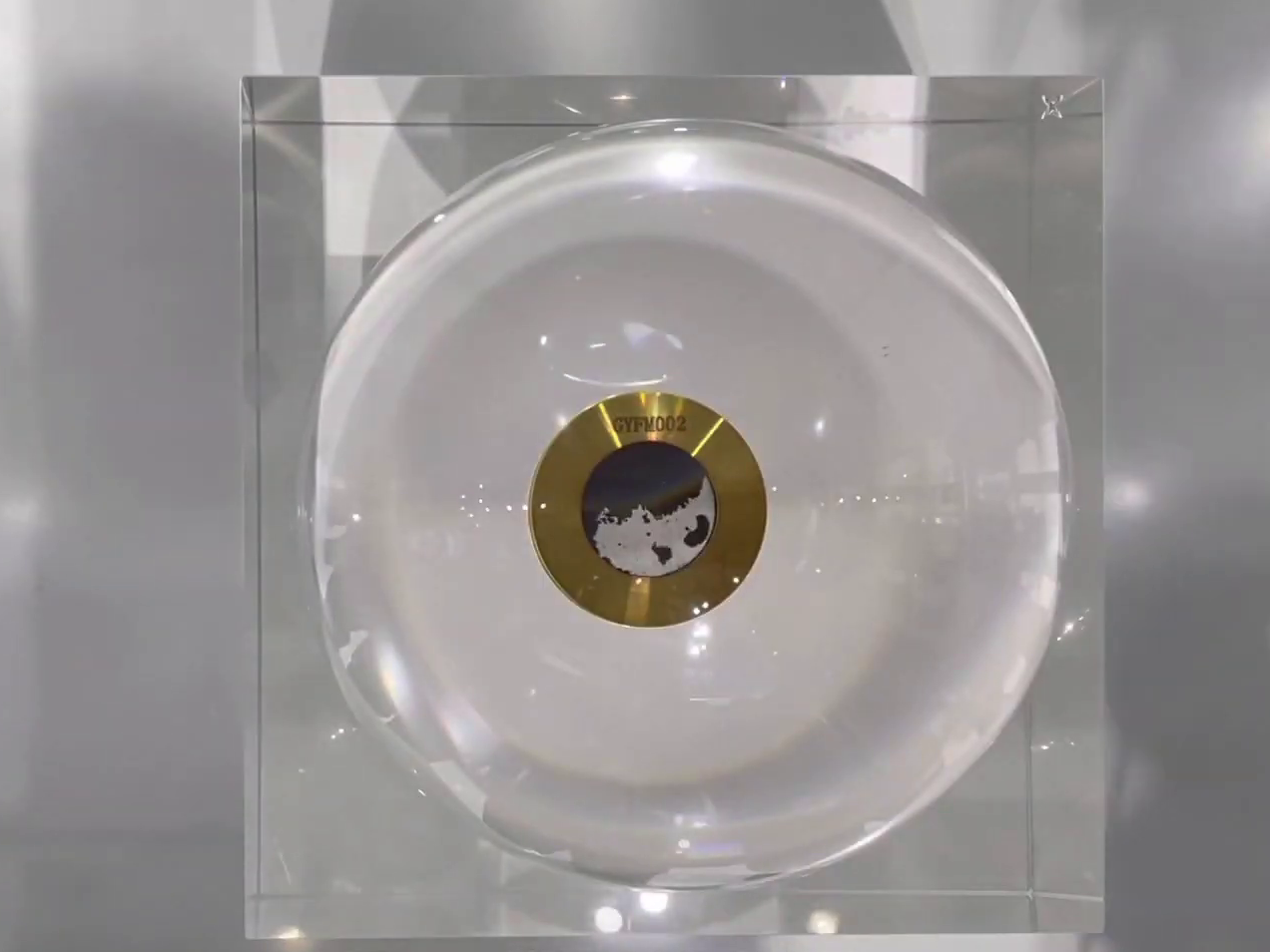
Lunar soil sample collected by China's Chang'e 5 mission, displayed at Airshow China 2021

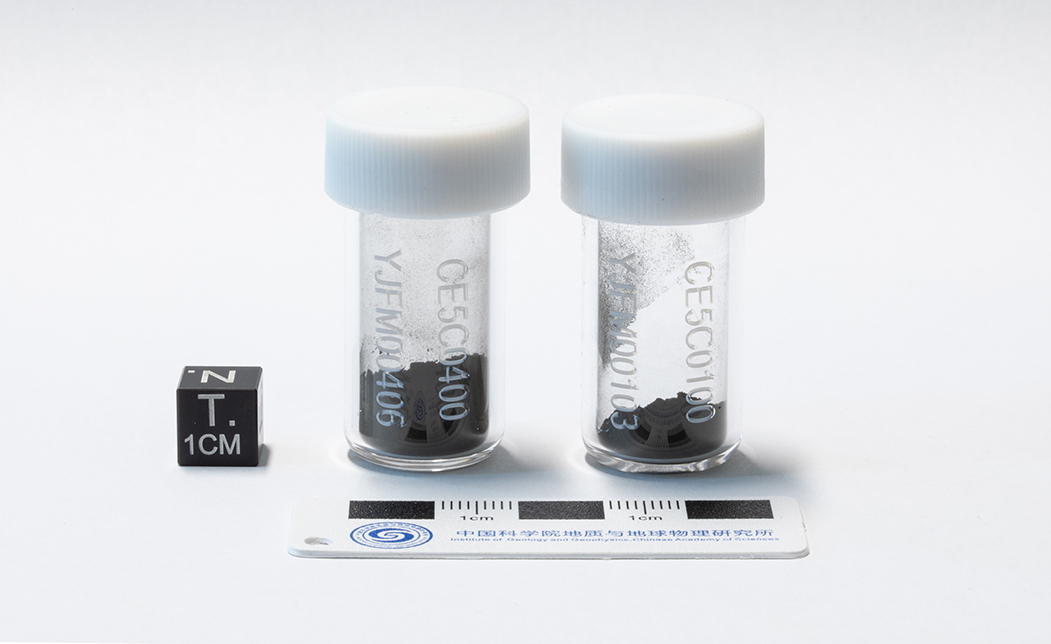
Soil samples studied by the Institute of Geology and Geophysics, Chinese Academy of Sciences

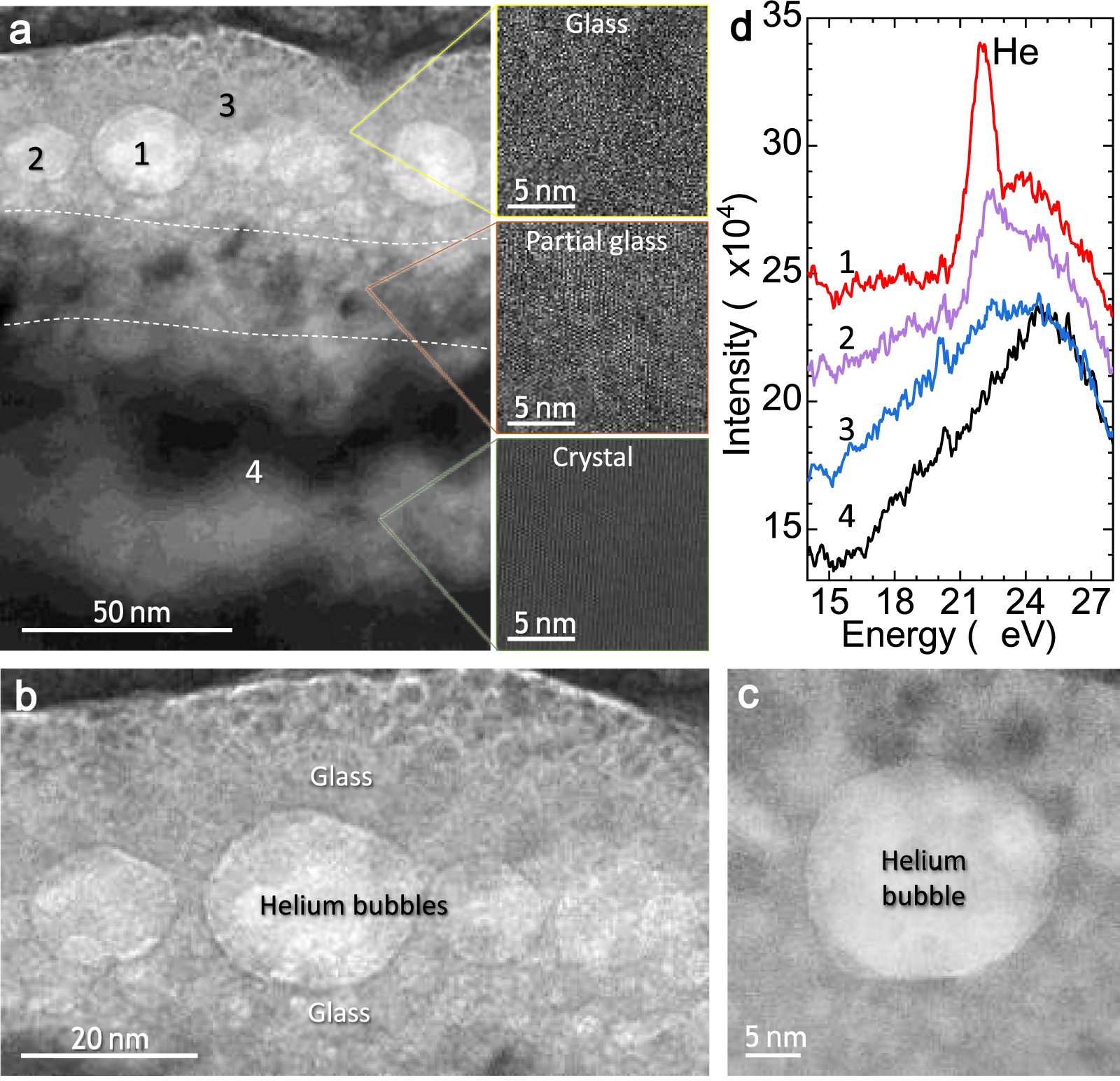
Helium-filled bubbles in ilmenite samples returned from Chang'e 5

The ~1,731 g (61.1 oz) of lunar samples collected by Chang'e 5 have enormous scientific importance, due to their abnormally young ages (<2.0 billion years old). In particular, they may provide insights on lunar chronology, petrogenesis, regional setting, geodynamic and thermal evolution, regolith formation, calibrating the lunar chronology function, constraining the lunar dynamo status, unraveling the deep mantle's properties, and assessing the Procellarum KREEP Terrain structures.

Dating this relatively young part of the Moon's surface would provide an additional calibration point for estimating the surface ages of other Solar System bodies. Wu Yanhua (吴艳华), deputy director of the China National Space Administration (CNSA) announced that the new samples will be shared with the UN and international partners for space research purposes.

Preliminary analysis of the basalt lava samples taken from Oceanus Procellarum, led by the Chinese Academy of Geological Sciences, determined the age of these rocks to be close to 1.96 billion years old, filling a critical age-gap of available lunar rock samples, which, among other applications, can assist in further calibrating planetary crater chronological tools. The team discovered evidence of hydroxyl molecules in the samples through reflectance spectra, indicating the likely presence of water molecules up to 120 ppm. The researchers postulated the water and hydroxyl molecules had been embedded in the lunar soil through solar wind.

Polycyclic aromatic hydrocarbons (PAHs) molecules were also discovered in the lunar soil samples. Their structures are highly condensed being comparable to ~4 nanometer graphene sheets. Meteorite impacts on the moon are the most likely source for theses molecules but the lunar soil is more enriched in polycyclic aromatics than meteorites suggesting a possible de novo formation. The formation or depositing of polycyclic aromatic hydrocarbons may be a significant role in the accretion of Carbon in lunar regolith. They are more stable than small organic compounds like amino acids which are likely destroyed by meteorite impacts.

== First Chinese flag on the Moon ==
Chang'e 5's lunar lander deployed the first Chinese flag on the Moon. The flag was made from a composite material to withstand the Moon's harsh environment without fading or deforming. Chinese scientists spent over a year testing dozens of possible materials for the flag. Weighing only 12 grams, it can maintain its true colors under a temperature difference of plus or minus 150 degrees Celsius.

== Related missions ==
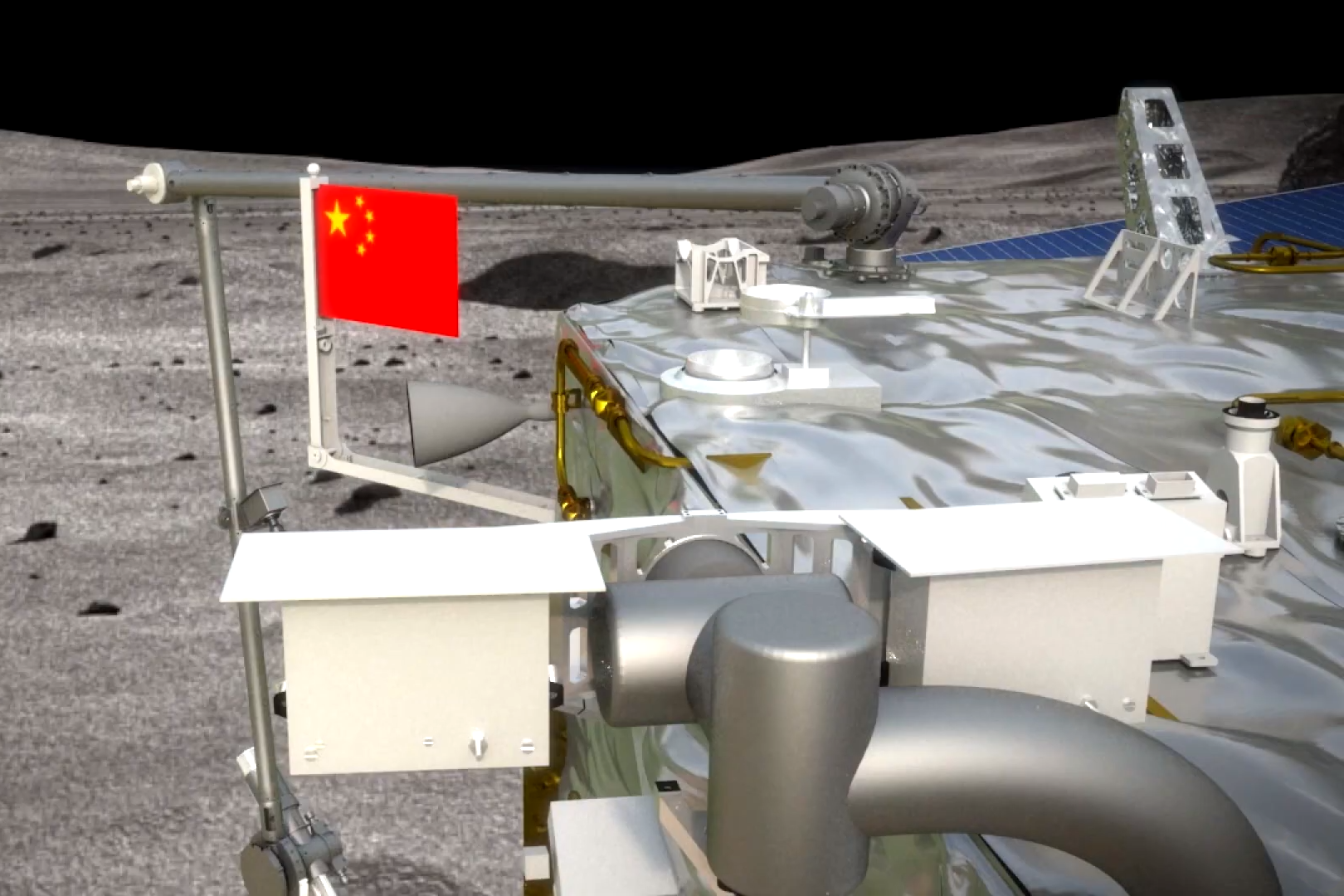
Artist's impression of the lander on the Moon

=== Chang'e 5-T1 ===
Chang'e 5-T1 is an experimental robotic lunar mission as a preliminary to Chang'e 5 that was launched on 23 October 2014, to conduct atmospheric re-entry tests on the capsule design that was planned to be used in the Chang'e 5 mission. Its service module, called DFH-3A, remained in orbit around the Earth before being relocated via Earth–Moon L_{2} to lunar orbit by 13 January 2015, where it is using its remaining 800 kg of fuel to test maneuvers critical to future lunar missions.

=== Chang'e 6 ===
Chang'e 6 is a follow-up mission by CNSA using the same mission architecture to return samples from the far side of the Moon. It launched on 3 May 2024 and landed on the far side of the Moon on 1 June 2024 and returned back samples on 25 June 2024.

== International collaboration ==
The European Space Agency (ESA) had supported the Chang'e 5 mission by providing tracking via ESA's Kourou station, located in French Guiana. ESA tracked the spacecraft during the launch and landing phases while providing on-call backup for China's ground stations throughout the mission. Data from the Kourou station had helped the mission control team at the Beijing Aerospace Flight Control Center to determine the spacecraft's health and orbit status. Chang'e 5 was returned to Earth on 16 December 2020. During the landing phase, ESA used its Maspalomas Station, located in the Canary Islands and operated by the Instituto Nacional de Técnica Aeroespacial (INTA) in Spain, to support the tracking efforts.

== International reactions to mission and samples ==
Many media commentators discussed Chang'e 5's in comparison to that of the last successful sample return oriented lunar missions in the 20th century, which were those conducted by the American Apollo program and the Soviet Luna programme in the 1960–70s, that involved Luna 15, Luna 16, and Luna 24 being sent to the Moon. Notably, the Luna 16 mission successfully returned about 100 grams of lunar soil a year later and two other sample return missions succeeded in subsequent years, the last one since Chang'e 5 being Luna 24 in 1976.

The moon rocks that the mission returned to Earth were commended to be "the perfect sample to close a 2-billion-year gap" in the understanding of lunar geology. The open access to the samples by CNSA to a consortium of scientists from Australia, US, UK, and Sweden were hailed as "science done in the ideal way: an international collaboration, with free sharing of data and knowledge—and all done in the most collegial way possible. This is diplomacy by science," by Brad Jolliff, director of the McDonnell Center for the Space Sciences at Washington University in St. Louis.

== See also ==
- China National Space Administration – National space agency of the People's Republic of China (CNSA)
- Chinese space program
  - Chinese Lunar Exploration Program – Lunar research program (2004–present)
  - Planetary Exploration of China – Chinese Solar System exploration program
- Exploration of the Moon – Missions to the Moon
- List of missions to the Moon
- List of artificial objects on the Moon
- Lunar resources – In situ resources on the Moon
- Moon landing – Arrival of a spacecraft on the Moon's surface
