= OHB SE =

Aerospace company in Bremen, Germany

Coordinates: 53°06′01″N 8°51′25″E

- Type: Societas Europaea
- ISIN: DE0005936124
- Industry: Aerospace technology
- Founded: 1981
- Headquarters: Bremen, Germany
- Key people: Marco R. Fuchs (CEO); Robert Wethmar (Chair of Supervisory Board)
- Revenue: EUR€1.248 billion (2025)
- Operating income: 125,000,000 (2023)
- Number of employees: 3,589 (2025)
- Website: www.ohb.de

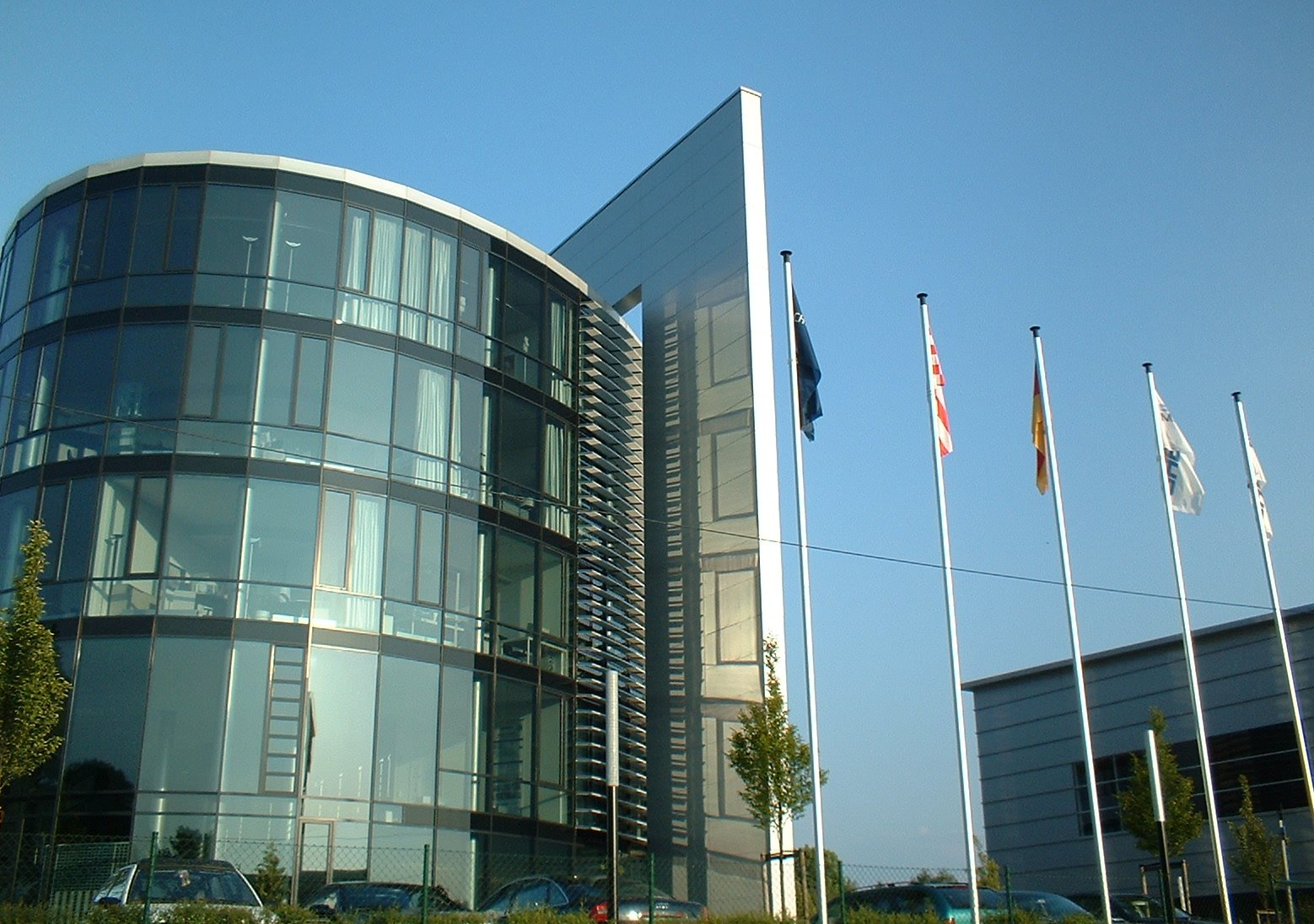
Main building in Bremen

OHB SE, headquartered in Bremen, is a European space and technology group specializing in the development and implementation of complete space systems, the production of components for various launcher programs as well as the operation of satellite systems and the processing and provision of the data collected. The company employs over 3,000 people at 15 locations in ten countries, most of them in Europe. Subsidiaries include OHB Sweden operating from Kista.

Since 2023 US Kohlberg Kravis Roberts holds shares on OHB. The majority owner is the family around the founders Fuchs.

== Corporate history ==
In 1981, Christa Fuchs took over Otto Hydraulik Bremen GmbH. Founded in 1958, the Hemelingen-based company had five employees at the time and was engaged in the construction and repair of electrical and hydraulic ship systems for the German Federal Armed Forces. Together with MBB-ERNO as project leader and the Sarstedt shipyard, OHB won the contract for the construction of the MPOSS (Multi-Purpose Oil Skimming System) lead ship in 1984. Manfred Fuchs, then director of space flight at MBB-ERNO, had the idea of entering the space industry with OHB as well. In 1985, he therefore moved to his wife's company. Among the first space contracts was the Mikroba project (microgravity with balloon), a project sponsored by the German Federal Ministry of Education and Research and the DFVLR (now the German Aerospace Center), which involved experiments in free fall. Furthermore, OHB developed a space-qualified centrifuge for the Spacelab space laboratory for testing blood and urine samples.

As the number of employees grew, the premises at Hemelinger Hafendamm became too small. OHB built a new headquarters near the University of Bremen, which was opened in October 1988. Manfred Fuchs' vision was to develop smaller and thus less expensive satellites; this was also one reason for renaming the company Orbital- und Hydrotechnologie Bremen-System GmbH in 1991. Together with the Center of Applied Space Technology and Microgravity (ZARM) at the University of Bremen, OHB developed BremSat, one of the first German small satellites. It was launched into space on board the Discovery on February 3, 1994. A further milestone was the SAFIR (Satellite for Information Relay) satellite series for position determination and object tracking, which also marked OHB's entry into the telecommunications market. As early as 1993, OHB Teledata GmbH was established for this purpose, specializing in telematics systems. In the same year, OHB built the COLUMBUS integration hall on its premises for the construction and integration of the satellites. With the acquisition of further major projects such as ABRIXAS and the growing number of employees, the company's headquarters soon became too small. Directly adjacent to the existing buildings, the new headquarters at Universitätsallee 29 were inaugurated in 1995. In 2001, a further building was constructed in what was then Karl-Ferdinand-Braun-Straße (now Manfred-Fuchs-Platz) together with a modern clean room hall.

OHB subsequently took the lead in the development of the major SAR-Lupe project, a satellite reconnaissance system on behalf of the Bundeswehr. In addition, the company was selected as a supplier for the International Space Station (ISS) and for the European Columbus station module. Meanwhile, OHB System AG and OHB Teledata AG, which had been listed on the stock exchange since the previous year, were merged to form OHB Technology AG in 2002. Over the next few years, further acquisitions and the establishment of various subsidiaries followed. Among other things, OHB acquired the MAN subsidiary MAN Technologie AG (now MT Aerospace) in 2005. In 2008, an attempt to acquire the three German Airbus plants in Nordenham, Varel and Augsburg failed. According to a report in Manager Magazin, the plan was to create a new listed aviation Group. Under the leadership of OHB, a company with 6,700 employees and sales of around one billion euros was to be created. In 2009, OHB acquired the Italian aerospace company Carlo Gavazzi Space (founded in 1981, now OHB Italia).

In January 2010, the company was awarded a contract for the construction of 14 satellites for the Galileo navigation system. The contract was worth EUR 566 million. A year later, Berry Smutny, the CEO of OHB-System AG, was dismissed after WikiLeaks published details of a conversation Smutny had with American embassy officials. Smutny reportedly called Galileo a "stupid idea" that wasted European taxpayers' money. Later in the year, the company acquired Thales Alenia Space Antwerp, which has since operated as Antwerp Space. At the beginning of 2011, the previous five business segments were combined to form the two segments Space Systems and Aerospace + Industrial Products. In May of this year, the annual general meeting resolved to rename OHB Technology AG into OHB AG. In addition, OHB acquired the "Space Systems Division" of Swedish Space Corporation in the same year, which was renamed OHB Sweden in the process.

In addition, the company developed the modular SmallGEO satellite platform, which serves as the basis for further major projects such as the H36W-1 communications satellite of the Spanish operator Hispasat and the third generation of Meteosat weather satellites. In 2013, the company was awarded a prime contract to develop and deliver a successor to the SAR-Lupe satellite reconnaissance system.

At the beginning of September 2014, the two largest subsidiaries, Bremen-based OHB System AG and Munich-based Kayser-Threde GmbH, merged to form OHB System AG with facilities in Bremen and Munich. This was followed in December 2015 by the relocation of the Munich site to a new building in Oberpfaffenhofen. OHB has been registered as a European Company (Societas Europaea) in the commercial register since March 2015.

With its investment in Rocket Factory Augsburg AG, the company has been participating in the development of a small launch vehicle (microlauncher) since 2018.

In 2020, the restructuring of the business segments was announced. All service activities arising from space technologies and data have since been combined in the third segment DIGITAL.

In 2023 OHB was taking the US financial investing company Kohlberg Kravis Roberts on board and withdrawed from the stock exchange. The Fuchs family still holds almost 70 percent of the shares, didn't sell any shares and will therefore remain the majority owner.

== Business segments ==
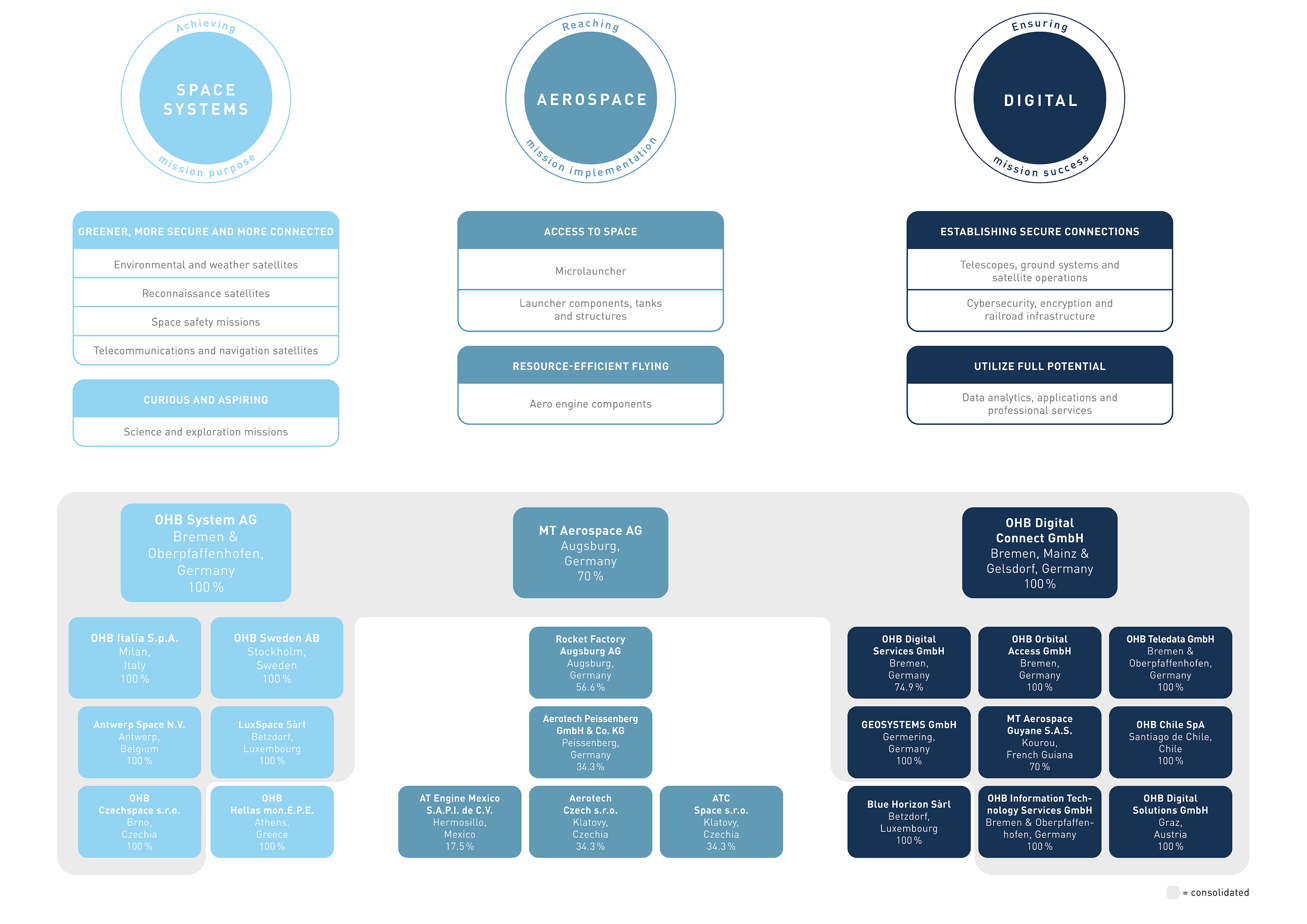
Activities and companies of the three business segments

=== Space Systems ===
This segment focuses on the development and production of near-Earth and geostationary satellites for navigation, science, communications, Earth and weather observation and reconnaissance, including scientific payloads. In the exploration area, concepts are developed for the exploration of the Solar System. In astronautical space flight, the focus lies on equipping and operating the International Space Station (ISS) and the future lunar station Gateway.

=== Aerospace ===
The segment focuses on the production and development of products such as large load-bearing, weight-optimized structures, booster housings as well as cryogenic and satellite tanks for the aerospace industry. Among other things, OHB is the largest German supplier for the Ariane program as well as an established manufacturer of components for satellite platforms, launch vehicles and aircraft such as SmallGEO, NASA's Space Launch System and the civil aircraft division of Airbus.

The participation Rocket Factory Augsburg AG is currently developing its own small launch vehicle (microlauncher) as a system supplier.

=== Digital ===
This segment brings together all services and solutions associated with space systems and their utilization. These include satellite operations, ground systems, antennas, optical and radio telescopes, and applications for transportation and mobility.

Other important components in this segment are downstream applications, i.e. the development and sale of software products for the use of space-based data from the areas of Earth observation, ship tracking (AIS) and navigation, infrastructure services for Deutsche Bahn's rail network, and IT services.

== Projects ==
The company has been working on numerous German, European and international projects related to small satellites, crewed space flight as well as security and reconnaissance technologies.

- Examples of OHB satellite missions for telecommunication, earth observation and reconnaissance are Small GEO (Hispasat AG1), BREMSAT, SAFIR 1&2, BIRD/RUBIN, ABRIXAS and the first German reconnaissance satellite system, SAR-Lupe.
- Examples of OHB microgravity facilities are the International Space Station racks Fluid Science Laboratory and European Physiology Modules.
- Projects OHB demonstrated at the 2006 Berlin Air Show included CONDOR/ARDS, an airborne modular reconnaissance system, and Mona Lisa, a study for planning and implementing a lunar exploration program.
- On 7 January 2010, the European Commission announced that the contract to build the first 14 operational satellites for the Galileo Global Satellite Navigation System was awarded to OHB System and Surrey Satellite Technology Limited (SSTL). Fourteen satellites will be built at a cost of €566m.
- In February 2012, an additional order of eight satellites was awarded to OHB System AG for €250M, after outbidding EADS Astrium tender offer. Thus bringing the total to 22 FOC satellites.
- In 2014/2015, OHB was in talks with OneWeb as part of a potential joint venture to open a new facility for manufacturing approximately 900 200 kg (440 lb)-small Internet-delivery satellites. OHB is just one of five European and US manufacturers competing to build these sub-US$500,000 satellites.
- In 2018 the ESA NEOSTEL ("Flyeye") telescope was under construction, due for completion in 2019, ready for installation in Sicily in 2020 by the Italian Space Agency.
- In 2018, the Institut Laue–Langevin and European Synchrotron Radiation Facility announce a new partnership between the two research centers and OHB SE.
- In 2018, OHB SE spun-off the start-up company Rocket Factory Augsburg AG (RFA). RFA's goal is the development of a highly reliable, low-cost small-satellite launcher.
- In 2019 MT Mechatronics (subsidiary of OHB SE), together with Illinois-based Ingersoll Machine Tools signed a contract to build the support structure of the Giant Magellan Telescope. The total value of the contract is $135 million. The structure is expected to be delivered to Chile at the end of 2025.

== Litigation ==
On 20 January 2021, the European Commission announced that it had awarded a €1.47 billion contract to Thales Alenia Space (TAS) and Airbus Defence and Space for 6 spacecraft by each manufacturer. The signing of the contracts to Thales Alenia Space and Airbus Defence and Space, scheduled on 29 January 2021, was suspended by the European Court of Justice following a protest filed by OHB SE, the losing bidder. The OHB protest at the ECJ's General Court is based on “allegations of theft of trade secrets”, and seeks both a suspension of the contract signatures and the cancellation of the contract award. In May 2021 ESA reported it signed the contracts to design and build the first batch of Galileo Second Generation (G2G) satellites with Thales Alenia Space and Airbus Defence and Space.
