= List of minor planets: 456001–457000 =

The following is a partial list of minor planets, running from minor-planet number 456001 through 457000, inclusive. The primary data for this and other partial lists is based on JPL's "Small-Body Orbital Elements" and data available from the Minor Planet Center. Critical list information is also provided by the MPC, unless otherwise specified from Lowell Observatory. A detailed description of the table's columns and additional sources are given on the main page including a complete list of every page in this series, and a statistical break-up on the dynamical classification of minor planets.

Also see the summary list of all named bodies in numerical and alphabetical order, and the corresponding naming citations for the number range of this particular list. New namings may only be added to this list after official publication, as the preannouncement of names is condemned by the Working Group for Small Bodies Nomenclature of the International Astronomical Union.

Near-Earth obj.	MBA (inner)	MBA (outer)	Centaur
Mars-crosser	MBA (middle)	Jupiter trojan	Trans-Neptunian obj.
Unclassified

== 456001–456100 ==
Designation			Discovery			Properties		Ref
Permanent	Provisional	Named after	Date	Site	Discoverer(s)	Category	Diam.	Ref
456001	2005 XF_{109}	—	November 22, 2005	Kitt Peak	Spacewatch	·	660 m	MPC · JPL
456002	2005 YZ_{5}	—	December 4, 2005	Kitt Peak	Spacewatch	·	630 m	MPC · JPL
456003	2005 YV_{6}	—	December 4, 2005	Kitt Peak	Spacewatch	·	1.3 km	MPC · JPL
456004	2005 YM_{20}	—	December 24, 2005	Kitt Peak	Spacewatch	EOS	2.0 km	MPC · JPL
456005	2005 YR_{21}	—	December 24, 2005	Kitt Peak	Spacewatch	·	1.4 km	MPC · JPL
456006	2005 YC_{23}	—	December 24, 2005	Kitt Peak	Spacewatch	H	610 m	MPC · JPL
456007	2005 YE_{45}	—	December 25, 2005	Kitt Peak	Spacewatch	·	1.3 km	MPC · JPL
456008	2005 YG_{45}	—	November 26, 2005	Mount Lemmon	Mount Lemmon Survey	·	1.9 km	MPC · JPL
456009	2005 YQ_{51}	—	December 1, 2005	Mount Lemmon	Mount Lemmon Survey	·	2.0 km	MPC · JPL
456010	2005 YS_{58}	—	December 24, 2005	Kitt Peak	Spacewatch	EOS	1.4 km	MPC · JPL
456011	2005 YX_{65}	—	December 25, 2005	Mount Lemmon	Mount Lemmon Survey	·	1.6 km	MPC · JPL
456012	2005 YT_{68}	—	December 26, 2005	Kitt Peak	Spacewatch	·	530 m	MPC · JPL
456013	2005 YX_{68}	—	December 26, 2005	Kitt Peak	Spacewatch	·	1.6 km	MPC · JPL
456014	2005 YS_{69}	—	December 26, 2005	Kitt Peak	Spacewatch	·	1.2 km	MPC · JPL
456015	2005 YT_{73}	—	December 8, 2005	Kitt Peak	Spacewatch	EOS	1.9 km	MPC · JPL
456016	2005 YC_{77}	—	December 24, 2005	Kitt Peak	Spacewatch	·	2.1 km	MPC · JPL
456017	2005 YO_{81}	—	December 24, 2005	Kitt Peak	Spacewatch	615	1.4 km	MPC · JPL
456018	2005 YY_{81}	—	November 25, 2005	Mount Lemmon	Mount Lemmon Survey	EOS	1.8 km	MPC · JPL
456019	2005 YM_{83}	—	December 24, 2005	Kitt Peak	Spacewatch	·	690 m	MPC · JPL
456020	2005 YU_{83}	—	December 24, 2005	Kitt Peak	Spacewatch	EOS	1.8 km	MPC · JPL
456021	2005 YY_{84}	—	December 25, 2005	Kitt Peak	Spacewatch	·	580 m	MPC · JPL
456022	2005 YW_{86}	—	December 25, 2005	Mount Lemmon	Mount Lemmon Survey	·	680 m	MPC · JPL
456023	2005 YB_{88}	—	December 25, 2005	Mount Lemmon	Mount Lemmon Survey	·	740 m	MPC · JPL
456024	2005 YN_{93}	—	December 26, 2005	Kitt Peak	Spacewatch	·	850 m	MPC · JPL
456025	2005 YQ_{94}	—	November 30, 2005	Socorro	LINEAR	·	900 m	MPC · JPL
456026	2005 YN_{102}	—	December 25, 2005	Kitt Peak	Spacewatch	·	680 m	MPC · JPL
456027	2005 YY_{104}	—	December 2, 2005	Mount Lemmon	Mount Lemmon Survey	·	1.4 km	MPC · JPL
456028	2005 YZ_{104}	—	December 2, 2005	Mount Lemmon	Mount Lemmon Survey	·	2.2 km	MPC · JPL
456029	2005 YA_{114}	—	December 25, 2005	Kitt Peak	Spacewatch	·	640 m	MPC · JPL
456030	2005 YP_{114}	—	December 25, 2005	Kitt Peak	Spacewatch	·	2.0 km	MPC · JPL
456031	2005 YV_{114}	—	December 25, 2005	Kitt Peak	Spacewatch	·	2.8 km	MPC · JPL
456032	2005 YY_{115}	—	December 25, 2005	Kitt Peak	Spacewatch	·	570 m	MPC · JPL
456033	2005 YZ_{115}	—	December 25, 2005	Kitt Peak	Spacewatch	·	620 m	MPC · JPL
456034	2005 YE_{132}	—	December 25, 2005	Mount Lemmon	Mount Lemmon Survey	·	1.3 km	MPC · JPL
456035	2005 YX_{140}	—	December 1, 2005	Mount Lemmon	Mount Lemmon Survey	·	1.6 km	MPC · JPL
456036	2005 YW_{154}	—	December 29, 2005	Kitt Peak	Spacewatch	·	1.9 km	MPC · JPL
456037	2005 YB_{158}	—	December 27, 2005	Kitt Peak	Spacewatch	·	1.3 km	MPC · JPL
456038	2005 YH_{164}	—	December 21, 2005	Kitt Peak	Spacewatch	·	2.3 km	MPC · JPL
456039	2005 YL_{166}	—	December 1, 2005	Mount Lemmon	Mount Lemmon Survey	·	2.1 km	MPC · JPL
456040	2005 YU_{176}	—	December 22, 2005	Kitt Peak	Spacewatch	·	1.9 km	MPC · JPL
456041	2005 YE_{180}	—	December 27, 2005	Kitt Peak	Spacewatch	PHO	1 km	MPC · JPL
456042	2005 YF_{200}	—	December 26, 2005	Kitt Peak	Spacewatch	·	2.4 km	MPC · JPL
456043	2005 YC_{205}	—	December 26, 2005	Mount Lemmon	Mount Lemmon Survey	·	2.3 km	MPC · JPL
456044	2005 YP_{215}	—	November 6, 2005	Mount Lemmon	Mount Lemmon Survey	·	1.8 km	MPC · JPL
456045	2005 YA_{216}	—	December 24, 2005	Kitt Peak	Spacewatch	·	1.6 km	MPC · JPL
456046	2005 YT_{216}	—	December 29, 2005	Mount Lemmon	Mount Lemmon Survey	·	1.9 km	MPC · JPL
456047	2005 YS_{239}	—	December 29, 2005	Kitt Peak	Spacewatch	·	1.7 km	MPC · JPL
456048	2005 YX_{264}	—	December 25, 2005	Kitt Peak	Spacewatch	·	500 m	MPC · JPL
456049	2005 YB_{266}	—	December 27, 2005	Kitt Peak	Spacewatch	·	1.6 km	MPC · JPL
456050	2005 YR_{267}	—	December 25, 2005	Mount Lemmon	Mount Lemmon Survey	·	1.7 km	MPC · JPL
456051	2006 AW	—	January 5, 2006	Catalina	CSS	APO	620 m	MPC · JPL
456052	2006 AS_{14}	—	December 6, 2005	Mount Lemmon	Mount Lemmon Survey	EOS	2.1 km	MPC · JPL
456053	2006 AY_{22}	—	January 4, 2006	Kitt Peak	Spacewatch	PHO	840 m	MPC · JPL
456054	2006 AA_{24}	—	January 4, 2006	Catalina	CSS	·	2.7 km	MPC · JPL
456055	2006 AG_{30}	—	January 2, 2006	Mount Lemmon	Mount Lemmon Survey	·	580 m	MPC · JPL
456056	2006 AW_{35}	—	December 22, 2005	Kitt Peak	Spacewatch	EOS	1.8 km	MPC · JPL
456057	2006 AF_{37}	—	January 4, 2006	Kitt Peak	Spacewatch	·	630 m	MPC · JPL
456058	2006 AB_{38}	—	January 5, 2006	Mount Lemmon	Mount Lemmon Survey	·	1.7 km	MPC · JPL
456059	2006 AV_{38}	—	December 25, 2005	Mount Lemmon	Mount Lemmon Survey	KOR	1.3 km	MPC · JPL
456060	2006 AZ_{46}	—	December 25, 2005	Kitt Peak	Spacewatch	BRA	1.6 km	MPC · JPL
456061	2006 AY_{53}	—	January 5, 2006	Kitt Peak	Spacewatch	BRA	1.6 km	MPC · JPL
456062	2006 AK_{58}	—	November 30, 2005	Mount Lemmon	Mount Lemmon Survey	·	590 m	MPC · JPL
456063	2006 AA_{60}	—	January 5, 2006	Kitt Peak	Spacewatch	·	1.4 km	MPC · JPL
456064	2006 AT_{61}	—	December 28, 2005	Kitt Peak	Spacewatch	·	2.6 km	MPC · JPL
456065	2006 AX_{63}	—	December 4, 2005	Mount Lemmon	Mount Lemmon Survey	·	1.7 km	MPC · JPL
456066	2006 AH_{65}	—	January 8, 2006	Kitt Peak	Spacewatch	·	670 m	MPC · JPL
456067	2006 AF_{70}	—	January 6, 2006	Kitt Peak	Spacewatch	·	520 m	MPC · JPL
456068	2006 AS_{74}	—	January 7, 2006	Socorro	LINEAR	·	3.5 km	MPC · JPL
456069	2006 AR_{80}	—	January 6, 2006	Mount Lemmon	Mount Lemmon Survey	·	1.8 km	MPC · JPL
456070	2006 AV_{92}	—	January 7, 2006	Kitt Peak	Spacewatch	·	520 m	MPC · JPL
456071	2006 AF_{105}	—	January 10, 2006	Mount Lemmon	Mount Lemmon Survey	·	1.7 km	MPC · JPL
456072	2006 BC_{11}	—	December 6, 2005	Mount Lemmon	Mount Lemmon Survey	·	630 m	MPC · JPL
456073	2006 BZ_{17}	—	October 28, 2005	Mount Lemmon	Mount Lemmon Survey	·	2.8 km	MPC · JPL
456074	2006 BK_{23}	—	January 6, 2006	Mount Lemmon	Mount Lemmon Survey	BRA	1.3 km	MPC · JPL
456075	2006 BB_{35}	—	January 8, 2006	Kitt Peak	Spacewatch	·	610 m	MPC · JPL
456076	2006 BM_{36}	—	January 23, 2006	Kitt Peak	Spacewatch	·	1.8 km	MPC · JPL
456077	2006 BT_{38}	—	January 24, 2006	Kitt Peak	Spacewatch	·	810 m	MPC · JPL
456078	2006 BE_{56}	—	January 23, 2006	Mount Lemmon	Mount Lemmon Survey	BRA	1.6 km	MPC · JPL
456079	2006 BU_{59}	—	November 12, 2005	Kitt Peak	Spacewatch	L5	8.6 km	MPC · JPL
456080	2006 BZ_{66}	—	January 23, 2006	Kitt Peak	Spacewatch	·	630 m	MPC · JPL
456081	2006 BA_{68}	—	January 23, 2006	Kitt Peak	Spacewatch	·	1.5 km	MPC · JPL
456082	2006 BF_{71}	—	January 23, 2006	Kitt Peak	Spacewatch	·	510 m	MPC · JPL
456083	2006 BT_{76}	—	January 23, 2006	Kitt Peak	Spacewatch	·	3.0 km	MPC · JPL
456084	2006 BW_{84}	—	January 25, 2006	Kitt Peak	Spacewatch	·	2.0 km	MPC · JPL
456085	2006 BF_{88}	—	January 25, 2006	Kitt Peak	Spacewatch	THM	2.0 km	MPC · JPL
456086	2006 BK_{88}	—	January 25, 2006	Kitt Peak	Spacewatch	·	1.8 km	MPC · JPL
456087	2006 BF_{106}	—	January 7, 2006	Mount Lemmon	Mount Lemmon Survey	·	540 m	MPC · JPL
456088	2006 BL_{113}	—	January 5, 2006	Mount Lemmon	Mount Lemmon Survey	·	1.3 km	MPC · JPL
456089	2006 BM_{114}	—	January 25, 2006	Kitt Peak	Spacewatch	·	850 m	MPC · JPL
456090	2006 BR_{123}	—	January 26, 2006	Kitt Peak	Spacewatch	·	510 m	MPC · JPL
456091	2006 BE_{128}	—	January 26, 2006	Kitt Peak	Spacewatch	·	1.2 km	MPC · JPL
456092	2006 BD_{137}	—	January 5, 2006	Mount Lemmon	Mount Lemmon Survey	·	970 m	MPC · JPL
456093	2006 BM_{152}	—	January 25, 2006	Kitt Peak	Spacewatch	·	1.6 km	MPC · JPL
456094	2006 BH_{164}	—	January 26, 2006	Mount Lemmon	Mount Lemmon Survey	L5	11 km	MPC · JPL
456095	2006 BO_{167}	—	January 26, 2006	Mount Lemmon	Mount Lemmon Survey	·	3.1 km	MPC · JPL
456096	2006 BC_{177}	—	January 27, 2006	Kitt Peak	Spacewatch	·	530 m	MPC · JPL
456097	2006 BZ_{177}	—	January 27, 2006	Mount Lemmon	Mount Lemmon Survey	V	620 m	MPC · JPL
456098	2006 BS_{194}	—	January 30, 2006	Kitt Peak	Spacewatch	·	530 m	MPC · JPL
456099	2006 BJ_{214}	—	January 23, 2006	Catalina	CSS	·	2.7 km	MPC · JPL
456100	2006 BZ_{222}	—	January 30, 2006	Kitt Peak	Spacewatch	·	590 m	MPC · JPL

== 456101–456200 ==
back to top

Designation			Discovery			Properties		Ref
Permanent	Provisional	Named after	Date	Site	Discoverer(s)	Category	Diam.	Ref
456101	2006 BE_{225}	—	January 30, 2006	Kitt Peak	Spacewatch	·	600 m	MPC · JPL
456102	2006 BO_{226}	—	January 7, 2006	Mount Lemmon	Mount Lemmon Survey	·	1.8 km	MPC · JPL
456103	2006 BZ_{227}	—	January 30, 2006	Kitt Peak	Spacewatch	H	470 m	MPC · JPL
456104	2006 BN_{230}	—	January 23, 2006	Kitt Peak	Spacewatch	EOS	1.9 km	MPC · JPL
456105	2006 BO_{238}	—	January 23, 2006	Kitt Peak	Spacewatch	·	2.2 km	MPC · JPL
456106	2006 BS_{250}	—	January 31, 2006	Kitt Peak	Spacewatch	·	3.7 km	MPC · JPL
456107	2006 BZ_{253}	—	January 31, 2006	Kitt Peak	Spacewatch	·	1.8 km	MPC · JPL
456108	2006 BY_{274}	—	January 23, 2006	Mount Lemmon	Mount Lemmon Survey	·	560 m	MPC · JPL
456109	2006 BT_{277}	—	January 30, 2006	Kitt Peak	Spacewatch	KOR	1.2 km	MPC · JPL
456110	2006 BF_{284}	—	January 31, 2006	Kitt Peak	Spacewatch	L5	7.5 km	MPC · JPL
456111	2006 CV_{2}	—	January 23, 2006	Mount Lemmon	Mount Lemmon Survey	KOR	1.0 km	MPC · JPL
456112	2006 CW_{19}	—	February 1, 2006	Mount Lemmon	Mount Lemmon Survey	·	500 m	MPC · JPL
456113	2006 CR_{32}	—	February 2, 2006	Kitt Peak	Spacewatch	·	630 m	MPC · JPL
456114	2006 CP_{35}	—	December 25, 2005	Kitt Peak	Spacewatch	·	1.8 km	MPC · JPL
456115	2006 CF_{50}	—	January 20, 2006	Kitt Peak	Spacewatch	·	810 m	MPC · JPL
456116	2006 CS_{56}	—	February 4, 2006	Mount Lemmon	Mount Lemmon Survey	·	590 m	MPC · JPL
456117	2006 CY_{56}	—	February 4, 2006	Mount Lemmon	Mount Lemmon Survey	L5	13 km	MPC · JPL
456118	2006 DK_{2}	—	January 26, 2006	Mount Lemmon	Mount Lemmon Survey	·	1.8 km	MPC · JPL
456119	2006 DN_{24}	—	January 25, 2006	Kitt Peak	Spacewatch	·	510 m	MPC · JPL
456120	2006 DC_{25}	—	February 20, 2006	Kitt Peak	Spacewatch	L5	6.7 km	MPC · JPL
456121	2006 DZ_{27}	—	February 20, 2006	Kitt Peak	Spacewatch	·	610 m	MPC · JPL
456122	2006 DZ_{54}	—	February 24, 2006	Kitt Peak	Spacewatch	·	1.9 km	MPC · JPL
456123	2006 DD_{63}	—	February 24, 2006	Kitt Peak	Spacewatch	·	2.1 km	MPC · JPL
456124	2006 DH_{76}	—	February 24, 2006	Kitt Peak	Spacewatch	·	2.3 km	MPC · JPL
456125	2006 DQ_{83}	—	February 24, 2006	Kitt Peak	Spacewatch	·	2.0 km	MPC · JPL
456126	2006 DT_{86}	—	February 24, 2006	Kitt Peak	Spacewatch	·	1.8 km	MPC · JPL
456127	2006 DY_{87}	—	February 24, 2006	Kitt Peak	Spacewatch	·	1.4 km	MPC · JPL
456128	2006 DD_{99}	—	February 25, 2006	Kitt Peak	Spacewatch	·	620 m	MPC · JPL
456129	2006 DO_{99}	—	February 25, 2006	Kitt Peak	Spacewatch	·	1.6 km	MPC · JPL
456130	2006 DO_{100}	—	January 26, 2006	Kitt Peak	Spacewatch	·	2.0 km	MPC · JPL
456131	2006 DY_{103}	—	February 25, 2006	Mount Lemmon	Mount Lemmon Survey	EOS	2.1 km	MPC · JPL
456132	2006 DF_{106}	—	February 25, 2006	Mount Lemmon	Mount Lemmon Survey	·	2.1 km	MPC · JPL
456133	2006 DZ_{108}	—	February 25, 2006	Kitt Peak	Spacewatch	·	2.0 km	MPC · JPL
456134	2006 DT_{110}	—	February 25, 2006	Kitt Peak	Spacewatch	·	2.2 km	MPC · JPL
456135	2006 DO_{132}	—	February 25, 2006	Kitt Peak	Spacewatch	·	1.9 km	MPC · JPL
456136	2006 DD_{134}	—	January 31, 2006	Kitt Peak	Spacewatch	·	640 m	MPC · JPL
456137	2006 DQ_{139}	—	January 8, 2002	Kitt Peak	Spacewatch	·	1.1 km	MPC · JPL
456138	2006 DN_{142}	—	February 4, 2006	Mount Lemmon	Mount Lemmon Survey	EOS	2.4 km	MPC · JPL
456139	2006 DZ_{144}	—	February 25, 2006	Mount Lemmon	Mount Lemmon Survey	·	640 m	MPC · JPL
456140	2006 DA_{145}	—	February 25, 2006	Mount Lemmon	Mount Lemmon Survey	·	2.9 km	MPC · JPL
456141	2006 DN_{148}	—	February 25, 2006	Kitt Peak	Spacewatch	·	2.1 km	MPC · JPL
456142	2006 DY_{177}	—	February 27, 2006	Mount Lemmon	Mount Lemmon Survey	VER	2.2 km	MPC · JPL
456143	2006 DH_{188}	—	February 27, 2006	Kitt Peak	Spacewatch	·	2.0 km	MPC · JPL
456144	2006 EQ_{2}	—	March 1, 2006	Altschwendt	W. Ries	·	610 m	MPC · JPL
456145	2006 EN_{9}	—	February 24, 2006	Kitt Peak	Spacewatch	EOS	1.8 km	MPC · JPL
456146	2006 EH_{26}	—	February 1, 2006	Mount Lemmon	Mount Lemmon Survey	·	2.0 km	MPC · JPL
456147	2006 ES_{44}	—	February 25, 2006	Kitt Peak	Spacewatch	·	550 m	MPC · JPL
456148	2006 EB_{53}	—	March 2, 2006	Kitt Peak	Spacewatch	·	2.5 km	MPC · JPL
456149	2006 EA_{73}	—	March 4, 2006	Mount Lemmon	Mount Lemmon Survey	·	650 m	MPC · JPL
456150	2006 FE_{2}	—	March 3, 2006	Kitt Peak	Spacewatch	·	2.5 km	MPC · JPL
456151	2006 FV_{5}	—	March 23, 2006	Mount Lemmon	Mount Lemmon Survey	·	1.5 km	MPC · JPL
456152	2006 FZ_{14}	—	March 23, 2006	Kitt Peak	Spacewatch	·	640 m	MPC · JPL
456153	2006 FZ_{15}	—	February 27, 2006	Kitt Peak	Spacewatch	·	740 m	MPC · JPL
456154	2006 FQ_{20}	—	March 23, 2006	Kitt Peak	Spacewatch	·	2.0 km	MPC · JPL
456155	2006 FP_{30}	—	March 2, 2006	Mount Lemmon	Mount Lemmon Survey	·	2.4 km	MPC · JPL
456156	2006 FU_{33}	—	March 26, 2006	Siding Spring	SSS	PHO	3.1 km	MPC · JPL
456157	2006 FT_{53}	—	March 26, 2006	Mount Lemmon	Mount Lemmon Survey	·	1.8 km	MPC · JPL
456158	2006 GJ_{1}	—	April 2, 2006	Kitt Peak	Spacewatch	·	2.3 km	MPC · JPL
456159	2006 GO_{2}	—	April 2, 2006	Bergisch Gladbach	W. Bickel	·	3.7 km	MPC · JPL
456160	2006 GJ_{7}	—	April 2, 2006	Kitt Peak	Spacewatch	·	2.8 km	MPC · JPL
456161	2006 GG_{17}	—	April 2, 2006	Kitt Peak	Spacewatch	EOS	1.4 km	MPC · JPL
456162	2006 GS_{18}	—	April 2, 2006	Kitt Peak	Spacewatch	·	2.2 km	MPC · JPL
456163	2006 GW_{21}	—	April 2, 2006	Kitt Peak	Spacewatch	·	2.1 km	MPC · JPL
456164	2006 GJ_{37}	—	April 2, 2006	Catalina	CSS	H	590 m	MPC · JPL
456165	2006 GA_{41}	—	April 7, 2006	Catalina	CSS	·	890 m	MPC · JPL
456166	2006 GD_{51}	—	March 4, 2006	Catalina	CSS	EOS	2.5 km	MPC · JPL
456167	2006 HF_{3}	—	March 23, 2006	Kitt Peak	Spacewatch	·	750 m	MPC · JPL
456168	2006 HS_{4}	—	March 23, 2006	Kitt Peak	Spacewatch	V	440 m	MPC · JPL
456169	2006 HV_{9}	—	April 19, 2006	Kitt Peak	Spacewatch	·	2.4 km	MPC · JPL
456170	2006 HX_{9}	—	April 19, 2006	Kitt Peak	Spacewatch	·	2.4 km	MPC · JPL
456171	2006 HQ_{11}	—	April 19, 2006	Kitt Peak	Spacewatch	·	4.7 km	MPC · JPL
456172	2006 HY_{22}	—	April 20, 2006	Kitt Peak	Spacewatch	·	2.7 km	MPC · JPL
456173	2006 HC_{26}	—	April 20, 2006	Kitt Peak	Spacewatch	·	600 m	MPC · JPL
456174	2006 HG_{27}	—	April 20, 2006	Kitt Peak	Spacewatch	·	3.6 km	MPC · JPL
456175	2006 HU_{33}	—	April 7, 2006	Kitt Peak	Spacewatch	EOS	1.7 km	MPC · JPL
456176	2006 HE_{36}	—	February 24, 2006	Kitt Peak	Spacewatch	EOS	2.3 km	MPC · JPL
456177	2006 HJ_{41}	—	March 2, 2006	Kitt Peak	Spacewatch	·	3.7 km	MPC · JPL
456178	2006 HZ_{43}	—	April 24, 2006	Kitt Peak	Spacewatch	·	750 m	MPC · JPL
456179	2006 HP_{48}	—	April 20, 2006	Kitt Peak	Spacewatch	VER	3.4 km	MPC · JPL
456180	2006 HR_{48}	—	March 23, 2006	Kitt Peak	Spacewatch	·	2.8 km	MPC · JPL
456181	2006 HS_{58}	—	April 21, 2006	Catalina	CSS	·	1.7 km	MPC · JPL
456182	2006 HP_{65}	—	April 24, 2006	Kitt Peak	Spacewatch	·	2.2 km	MPC · JPL
456183	2006 HS_{65}	—	April 24, 2006	Kitt Peak	Spacewatch	THM	2.2 km	MPC · JPL
456184	2006 HY_{68}	—	April 24, 2006	Mount Lemmon	Mount Lemmon Survey	·	2.1 km	MPC · JPL
456185	2006 HG_{70}	—	April 25, 2006	Kitt Peak	Spacewatch	·	2.6 km	MPC · JPL
456186	2006 HU_{74}	—	April 25, 2006	Kitt Peak	Spacewatch	EOS	1.6 km	MPC · JPL
456187	2006 HN_{77}	—	April 25, 2006	Kitt Peak	Spacewatch	EOS	1.9 km	MPC · JPL
456188	2006 HD_{78}	—	March 24, 2006	Kitt Peak	Spacewatch	·	3.0 km	MPC · JPL
456189	2006 HB_{85}	—	April 26, 2006	Siding Spring	SSS	·	2.7 km	MPC · JPL
456190	2006 HM_{89}	—	April 20, 2006	Catalina	CSS	PHO	1.2 km	MPC · JPL
456191	2006 HT_{89}	—	April 25, 2006	Catalina	CSS	·	3.2 km	MPC · JPL
456192	2006 HB_{99}	—	April 30, 2006	Kitt Peak	Spacewatch	·	550 m	MPC · JPL
456193	2006 HN_{102}	—	April 30, 2006	Kitt Peak	Spacewatch	·	2.5 km	MPC · JPL
456194	2006 HB_{118}	—	March 5, 2006	Kitt Peak	Spacewatch	·	2.9 km	MPC · JPL
456195	2006 HE_{119}	—	April 21, 2006	Kitt Peak	Spacewatch	(2076)	550 m	MPC · JPL
456196	2006 HU_{119}	—	April 30, 2006	Kitt Peak	Spacewatch	·	3.5 km	MPC · JPL
456197	2006 HJ_{121}	—	April 19, 2006	Kitt Peak	Spacewatch	·	3.4 km	MPC · JPL
456198	2006 HE_{151}	—	April 27, 2006	Catalina	CSS	·	3.6 km	MPC · JPL
456199	2006 JX_{10}	—	May 1, 2006	Kitt Peak	Spacewatch	·	870 m	MPC · JPL
456200	2006 JM_{12}	—	May 1, 2006	Kitt Peak	Spacewatch	·	3.9 km	MPC · JPL

== 456201–456300 ==
back to top

Designation			Discovery			Properties		Ref
Permanent	Provisional	Named after	Date	Site	Discoverer(s)	Category	Diam.	Ref
456201	2006 JY_{13}	—	May 3, 2006	Kitt Peak	Spacewatch	·	4.2 km	MPC · JPL
456202	2006 JQ_{16}	—	May 2, 2006	Kitt Peak	Spacewatch	·	740 m	MPC · JPL
456203	2006 JL_{19}	—	April 24, 2006	Kitt Peak	Spacewatch	·	2.7 km	MPC · JPL
456204	2006 JV_{19}	—	April 24, 2006	Kitt Peak	Spacewatch	·	1.4 km	MPC · JPL
456205	2006 JG_{31}	—	May 3, 2006	Kitt Peak	Spacewatch	·	2.7 km	MPC · JPL
456206	2006 JH_{31}	—	April 29, 2006	Kitt Peak	Spacewatch	·	880 m	MPC · JPL
456207	2006 JA_{32}	—	April 24, 2006	Kitt Peak	Spacewatch	·	920 m	MPC · JPL
456208	2006 JQ_{36}	—	May 4, 2006	Kitt Peak	Spacewatch	PHO	950 m	MPC · JPL
456209	2006 JP_{45}	—	May 8, 2006	Mount Lemmon	Mount Lemmon Survey	THB	2.9 km	MPC · JPL
456210	2006 JD_{60}	—	April 24, 2006	Kitt Peak	Spacewatch	·	3.5 km	MPC · JPL
456211	2006 KA_{1}	—	May 19, 2006	Mount Lemmon	Mount Lemmon Survey	H	550 m	MPC · JPL
456212	2006 KL_{12}	—	May 1, 2006	Catalina	CSS	·	3.0 km	MPC · JPL
456213	2006 KS_{19}	—	May 16, 2006	Palomar	NEAT	·	1.3 km	MPC · JPL
456214	2006 KM_{29}	—	May 20, 2006	Catalina	CSS	·	3.2 km	MPC · JPL
456215	2006 KS_{30}	—	May 20, 2006	Kitt Peak	Spacewatch	·	3.1 km	MPC · JPL
456216	2006 KB_{34}	—	May 20, 2006	Kitt Peak	Spacewatch	·	860 m	MPC · JPL
456217	2006 KX_{36}	—	May 21, 2006	Mount Lemmon	Mount Lemmon Survey	·	2.4 km	MPC · JPL
456218	2006 KH_{37}	—	May 22, 2006	Kitt Peak	Spacewatch	·	3.8 km	MPC · JPL
456219	2006 KW_{40}	—	May 19, 2006	Catalina	CSS	T_{j} (2.97)	3.2 km	MPC · JPL
456220	2006 KH_{44}	—	May 21, 2006	Kitt Peak	Spacewatch	·	3.1 km	MPC · JPL
456221	2006 KW_{44}	—	May 21, 2006	Kitt Peak	Spacewatch	EOS	2.2 km	MPC · JPL
456222	2006 KU_{46}	—	April 20, 2006	Kitt Peak	Spacewatch	·	790 m	MPC · JPL
456223	2006 KD_{51}	—	May 21, 2006	Mount Lemmon	Mount Lemmon Survey	·	3.9 km	MPC · JPL
456224	2006 KT_{52}	—	May 21, 2006	Kitt Peak	Spacewatch	H	690 m	MPC · JPL
456225	2006 KV_{53}	—	May 21, 2006	Kitt Peak	Spacewatch	·	2.8 km	MPC · JPL
456226	2006 KK_{58}	—	May 22, 2006	Kitt Peak	Spacewatch	·	760 m	MPC · JPL
456227	2006 KC_{62}	—	May 8, 2006	Mount Lemmon	Mount Lemmon Survey	PHO	980 m	MPC · JPL
456228	2006 KL_{62}	—	May 22, 2006	Kitt Peak	Spacewatch	·	740 m	MPC · JPL
456229	2006 KT_{66}	—	May 24, 2006	Kitt Peak	Spacewatch	·	2.8 km	MPC · JPL
456230	2006 KG_{73}	—	May 9, 2006	Mount Lemmon	Mount Lemmon Survey	·	2.7 km	MPC · JPL
456231	2006 KW_{86}	—	May 26, 2006	Mount Lemmon	Mount Lemmon Survey	H	600 m	MPC · JPL
456232	2006 KB_{93}	—	May 25, 2006	Kitt Peak	Spacewatch	·	1.4 km	MPC · JPL
456233	2006 KF_{95}	—	May 25, 2006	Kitt Peak	Spacewatch	·	2.6 km	MPC · JPL
456234	2006 KU_{99}	—	May 28, 2006	Kitt Peak	Spacewatch	H	490 m	MPC · JPL
456235	2006 KL_{117}	—	May 29, 2006	Kitt Peak	Spacewatch	PHO	1.2 km	MPC · JPL
456236	2006 KC_{123}	—	May 20, 2006	Kitt Peak	Spacewatch	·	3.0 km	MPC · JPL
456237	2006 MM_{6}	—	June 20, 2006	Mount Lemmon	Mount Lemmon Survey	·	1.2 km	MPC · JPL
456238	2006 MA_{8}	—	June 18, 2006	Kitt Peak	Spacewatch	V	670 m	MPC · JPL
456239	2006 MQ_{9}	—	June 20, 2006	Kitt Peak	Spacewatch	·	3.5 km	MPC · JPL
456240	2006 OW	—	July 18, 2006	Bergisch Gladbach	W. Bickel	·	1.7 km	MPC · JPL
456241	2006 ON_{6}	—	July 21, 2006	Mount Lemmon	Mount Lemmon Survey	·	1.6 km	MPC · JPL
456242	2006 OH_{8}	—	July 20, 2006	Palomar	NEAT	·	1.1 km	MPC · JPL
456243	2006 OW_{18}	—	March 11, 2005	Mount Lemmon	Mount Lemmon Survey	·	3.6 km	MPC · JPL
456244	2006 PK_{5}	—	August 12, 2006	Palomar	NEAT	H	720 m	MPC · JPL
456245	2006 PL_{6}	—	August 12, 2006	Palomar	NEAT	·	1.8 km	MPC · JPL
456246	2006 PD_{34}	—	August 15, 2006	Palomar	NEAT	·	1.4 km	MPC · JPL
456247	2006 PZ_{37}	—	August 13, 2006	Palomar	NEAT	·	2.4 km	MPC · JPL
456248	2006 QG_{4}	—	August 18, 2006	Kitt Peak	Spacewatch	(5)	1.2 km	MPC · JPL
456249	2006 QP_{4}	—	August 17, 2006	Palomar	NEAT	·	4.3 km	MPC · JPL
456250	2006 QF_{7}	—	August 17, 2006	Palomar	NEAT	·	2.2 km	MPC · JPL
456251	2006 QZ_{10}	—	August 21, 2006	Kitt Peak	Spacewatch	T_{j} (2.98) · 3:2	3.6 km	MPC · JPL
456252	2006 QJ_{24}	—	August 17, 2006	Palomar	NEAT	·	1.4 km	MPC · JPL
456253	2006 QE_{39}	—	August 19, 2006	Anderson Mesa	LONEOS	·	3.2 km	MPC · JPL
456254	2006 QD_{88}	—	August 27, 2006	Kitt Peak	Spacewatch	EUN	1.1 km	MPC · JPL
456255	2006 QR_{101}	—	August 19, 2006	Kitt Peak	Spacewatch	·	1.6 km	MPC · JPL
456256	2006 QZ_{112}	—	August 24, 2006	Socorro	LINEAR	PHO	2.3 km	MPC · JPL
456257	2006 QM_{132}	—	August 22, 2006	Siding Spring	SSS	H	720 m	MPC · JPL
456258	2006 QM_{148}	—	August 18, 2006	Kitt Peak	Spacewatch	·	1.6 km	MPC · JPL
456259	2006 QT_{148}	—	August 18, 2006	Kitt Peak	Spacewatch	(5)	1.0 km	MPC · JPL
456260	2006 QY_{164}	—	August 29, 2006	Anderson Mesa	LONEOS	·	1.2 km	MPC · JPL
456261	2006 QL_{184}	—	August 18, 2006	Kitt Peak	Spacewatch	·	1.7 km	MPC · JPL
456262	2006 QX_{185}	—	August 27, 2006	Kitt Peak	Spacewatch	·	1.0 km	MPC · JPL
456263	2006 RW_{8}	—	September 12, 2006	Catalina	CSS	·	1.1 km	MPC · JPL
456264	2006 RP_{21}	—	September 15, 2006	Kitt Peak	Spacewatch	·	1.1 km	MPC · JPL
456265	2006 RM_{23}	—	September 12, 2006	Catalina	CSS	·	1.3 km	MPC · JPL
456266	2006 RG_{27}	—	September 14, 2006	Catalina	CSS	·	2.0 km	MPC · JPL
456267	2006 RT_{33}	—	September 12, 2006	Catalina	CSS	(5)	1.0 km	MPC · JPL
456268	2006 RE_{42}	—	September 14, 2006	Kitt Peak	Spacewatch	·	1.0 km	MPC · JPL
456269	2006 RQ_{47}	—	September 14, 2006	Kitt Peak	Spacewatch	(5)	970 m	MPC · JPL
456270	2006 RK_{49}	—	September 14, 2006	Kitt Peak	Spacewatch	·	990 m	MPC · JPL
456271	2006 RX_{49}	—	September 14, 2006	Kitt Peak	Spacewatch	·	860 m	MPC · JPL
456272	2006 RS_{54}	—	September 14, 2006	Kitt Peak	Spacewatch	·	1.4 km	MPC · JPL
456273	2006 RU_{68}	—	August 18, 2006	Kitt Peak	Spacewatch	(5)	1.0 km	MPC · JPL
456274	2006 RM_{75}	—	September 15, 2006	Kitt Peak	Spacewatch	·	1.3 km	MPC · JPL
456275	2006 RV_{79}	—	September 15, 2006	Kitt Peak	Spacewatch	NYS	1.1 km	MPC · JPL
456276	2006 RB_{80}	—	September 15, 2006	Kitt Peak	Spacewatch	·	1.3 km	MPC · JPL
456277	2006 RC_{85}	—	September 15, 2006	Kitt Peak	Spacewatch	·	830 m	MPC · JPL
456278	2006 RX_{105}	—	March 15, 2004	Kitt Peak	Spacewatch	(5)	930 m	MPC · JPL
456279	2006 RL_{108}	—	September 14, 2006	Mauna Kea	Masiero, J.	NYS	1.1 km	MPC · JPL
456280	2006 SB_{1}	—	September 16, 2006	Kitt Peak	Spacewatch	·	1.5 km	MPC · JPL
456281	2006 SC_{8}	—	September 16, 2006	Catalina	CSS	H	680 m	MPC · JPL
456282	2006 ST_{8}	—	August 27, 2006	Anderson Mesa	LONEOS	·	1.5 km	MPC · JPL
456283	2006 SB_{17}	—	September 17, 2006	Kitt Peak	Spacewatch	·	860 m	MPC · JPL
456284	2006 SY_{26}	—	September 16, 2006	Catalina	CSS	·	1.5 km	MPC · JPL
456285	2006 SK_{56}	—	September 19, 2006	Catalina	CSS	·	1.3 km	MPC · JPL
456286	2006 SB_{74}	—	September 19, 2006	Kitt Peak	Spacewatch	·	990 m	MPC · JPL
456287	2006 SS_{76}	—	September 20, 2006	Kitt Peak	Spacewatch	·	1.1 km	MPC · JPL
456288	2006 SH_{77}	—	September 19, 2006	Catalina	CSS	·	1.1 km	MPC · JPL
456289	2006 SU_{82}	—	September 18, 2006	Kitt Peak	Spacewatch	·	1.2 km	MPC · JPL
456290	2006 SO_{92}	—	September 18, 2006	Kitt Peak	Spacewatch	·	1.0 km	MPC · JPL
456291	2006 SD_{95}	—	September 18, 2006	Kitt Peak	Spacewatch	·	880 m	MPC · JPL
456292	2006 SQ_{96}	—	September 18, 2006	Kitt Peak	Spacewatch	·	1.2 km	MPC · JPL
456293	2006 SE_{105}	—	September 19, 2006	Catalina	CSS	·	1.9 km	MPC · JPL
456294	2006 SS_{110}	—	September 20, 2006	Socorro	LINEAR	·	1.7 km	MPC · JPL
456295	2006 SD_{116}	—	September 24, 2006	Anderson Mesa	LONEOS	·	1.7 km	MPC · JPL
456296	2006 SB_{119}	—	September 18, 2006	Catalina	CSS	H	810 m	MPC · JPL
456297	2006 SB_{121}	—	September 18, 2006	Catalina	CSS	·	1.3 km	MPC · JPL
456298	2006 SG_{122}	—	September 19, 2006	Catalina	CSS	·	1.6 km	MPC · JPL
456299	2006 SN_{128}	—	September 17, 2006	Anderson Mesa	LONEOS	·	3.5 km	MPC · JPL
456300	2006 SX_{128}	—	September 17, 2006	Catalina	CSS	·	1.4 km	MPC · JPL

== 456301–456400 ==
back to top

Designation			Discovery			Properties		Ref
Permanent	Provisional	Named after	Date	Site	Discoverer(s)	Category	Diam.	Ref
456301	2006 SV_{134}	—	September 28, 2006	Catalina	CSS	APO	640 m	MPC · JPL
456302	2006 SU_{138}	—	September 21, 2006	Anderson Mesa	LONEOS	H	660 m	MPC · JPL
456303	2006 SY_{143}	—	September 19, 2006	Kitt Peak	Spacewatch	·	970 m	MPC · JPL
456304	2006 SX_{144}	—	September 19, 2006	Kitt Peak	Spacewatch	·	1.2 km	MPC · JPL
456305	2006 SP_{145}	—	September 19, 2006	Kitt Peak	Spacewatch	·	1.5 km	MPC · JPL
456306	2006 ST_{171}	—	September 25, 2006	Kitt Peak	Spacewatch	·	970 m	MPC · JPL
456307	2006 SQ_{187}	—	September 26, 2006	Kitt Peak	Spacewatch	3:2	4.4 km	MPC · JPL
456308	2006 SH_{188}	—	September 26, 2006	Kitt Peak	Spacewatch	MAS	690 m	MPC · JPL
456309	2006 SS_{199}	—	September 24, 2006	Kitt Peak	Spacewatch	·	1.2 km	MPC · JPL
456310	2006 SJ_{211}	—	September 16, 2006	Kitt Peak	Spacewatch	·	820 m	MPC · JPL
456311	2006 SN_{215}	—	September 27, 2006	Kitt Peak	Spacewatch	·	970 m	MPC · JPL
456312	2006 SM_{238}	—	September 26, 2006	Kitt Peak	Spacewatch	·	1.0 km	MPC · JPL
456313	2006 SV_{239}	—	September 18, 2006	Kitt Peak	Spacewatch	·	1.5 km	MPC · JPL
456314	2006 SZ_{239}	—	September 18, 2006	Kitt Peak	Spacewatch	·	1.1 km	MPC · JPL
456315	2006 SG_{246}	—	September 26, 2006	Mount Lemmon	Mount Lemmon Survey	·	640 m	MPC · JPL
456316	2006 SY_{268}	—	September 26, 2006	Kitt Peak	Spacewatch	·	1.2 km	MPC · JPL
456317	2006 SZ_{283}	—	September 26, 2006	Catalina	CSS	·	1.5 km	MPC · JPL
456318	2006 SC_{287}	—	September 22, 2006	Anderson Mesa	LONEOS	·	2.0 km	MPC · JPL
456319	2006 SM_{289}	—	September 26, 2006	Catalina	CSS	·	2.1 km	MPC · JPL
456320	2006 SZ_{296}	—	September 25, 2006	Kitt Peak	Spacewatch	·	810 m	MPC · JPL
456321	2006 SH_{310}	—	September 27, 2006	Kitt Peak	Spacewatch	·	1.1 km	MPC · JPL
456322	2006 SD_{316}	—	September 27, 2006	Kitt Peak	Spacewatch	BRG	1.0 km	MPC · JPL
456323	2006 SY_{319}	—	September 17, 2006	Kitt Peak	Spacewatch	NYS	1.2 km	MPC · JPL
456324	2006 SB_{328}	—	September 27, 2006	Kitt Peak	Spacewatch	(12739)	1.6 km	MPC · JPL
456325	2006 SS_{336}	—	September 28, 2006	Kitt Peak	Spacewatch	·	1.3 km	MPC · JPL
456326	2006 SG_{344}	—	September 28, 2006	Kitt Peak	Spacewatch	·	1.2 km	MPC · JPL
456327	2006 SZ_{344}	—	September 28, 2006	Kitt Peak	Spacewatch	·	1.1 km	MPC · JPL
456328	2006 SB_{345}	—	September 28, 2006	Kitt Peak	Spacewatch	·	1.2 km	MPC · JPL
456329	2006 SW_{347}	—	September 18, 2006	Kitt Peak	Spacewatch	·	1.1 km	MPC · JPL
456330	2006 SK_{350}	—	September 18, 2006	Kitt Peak	Spacewatch	·	890 m	MPC · JPL
456331	2006 SU_{350}	—	September 14, 2006	Catalina	CSS	·	1.8 km	MPC · JPL
456332	2006 SC_{356}	—	September 30, 2006	Catalina	CSS	·	1.5 km	MPC · JPL
456333	2006 SB_{364}	—	September 27, 2006	Mount Lemmon	Mount Lemmon Survey	·	2.3 km	MPC · JPL
456334	2006 SN_{366}	—	September 30, 2006	Mount Lemmon	Mount Lemmon Survey	·	910 m	MPC · JPL
456335	2006 SG_{400}	—	September 19, 2006	Kitt Peak	Spacewatch	·	980 m	MPC · JPL
456336	2006 SB_{403}	—	September 26, 2006	Mount Lemmon	Mount Lemmon Survey	·	1.1 km	MPC · JPL
456337	2006 SA_{410}	—	November 28, 1994	Kitt Peak	Spacewatch	KON	1.8 km	MPC · JPL
456338	2006 SE_{413}	—	September 19, 2006	Catalina	CSS	·	1.3 km	MPC · JPL
456339	2006 TO_{1}	—	October 1, 2006	Eskridge	Farpoint	H	610 m	MPC · JPL
456340	2006 TW_{12}	—	September 28, 2006	Catalina	CSS	·	1.5 km	MPC · JPL
456341	2006 TD_{14}	—	October 10, 2006	Palomar	NEAT	·	1.4 km	MPC · JPL
456342	2006 TK_{17}	—	September 30, 2006	Mount Lemmon	Mount Lemmon Survey	MIS	1.7 km	MPC · JPL
456343	2006 TW_{19}	—	September 25, 2006	Mount Lemmon	Mount Lemmon Survey	EUN	940 m	MPC · JPL
456344	2006 TN_{21}	—	September 27, 2006	Mount Lemmon	Mount Lemmon Survey	·	2.0 km	MPC · JPL
456345	2006 TY_{23}	—	September 30, 2006	Mount Lemmon	Mount Lemmon Survey	ADE	1.6 km	MPC · JPL
456346	2006 TN_{38}	—	October 12, 2006	Kitt Peak	Spacewatch	·	1.0 km	MPC · JPL
456347	2006 TT_{48}	—	October 12, 2006	Kitt Peak	Spacewatch	·	1.0 km	MPC · JPL
456348	2006 TU_{52}	—	October 12, 2006	Kitt Peak	Spacewatch	·	1.7 km	MPC · JPL
456349	2006 TE_{56}	—	October 13, 2006	Kitt Peak	Spacewatch	·	790 m	MPC · JPL
456350	2006 TX_{67}	—	October 11, 2006	Palomar	NEAT	·	2.1 km	MPC · JPL
456351	2006 TT_{72}	—	August 28, 2006	Catalina	CSS	JUN	940 m	MPC · JPL
456352	2006 TR_{77}	—	October 12, 2006	Kitt Peak	Spacewatch	·	1.3 km	MPC · JPL
456353	2006 TM_{78}	—	September 26, 2006	Mount Lemmon	Mount Lemmon Survey	·	1.5 km	MPC · JPL
456354	2006 TA_{83}	—	October 13, 2006	Kitt Peak	Spacewatch	·	1.6 km	MPC · JPL
456355	2006 TG_{83}	—	October 13, 2006	Kitt Peak	Spacewatch	·	1.0 km	MPC · JPL
456356	2006 TT_{84}	—	October 13, 2006	Kitt Peak	Spacewatch	·	920 m	MPC · JPL
456357	2006 TO_{86}	—	October 13, 2006	Kitt Peak	Spacewatch	EUN	840 m	MPC · JPL
456358	2006 TV_{88}	—	October 13, 2006	Kitt Peak	Spacewatch	·	2.4 km	MPC · JPL
456359	2006 TY_{92}	—	October 15, 2006	Kitt Peak	Spacewatch	·	1.3 km	MPC · JPL
456360	2006 TB_{94}	—	October 15, 2006	Kitt Peak	Spacewatch	·	920 m	MPC · JPL
456361	2006 TP_{104}	—	October 15, 2006	Kitt Peak	Spacewatch	·	1.2 km	MPC · JPL
456362	2006 TG_{107}	—	July 21, 2006	Mount Lemmon	Mount Lemmon Survey	T_{j} (2.96)	3.3 km	MPC · JPL
456363	2006 TH_{109}	—	October 3, 2006	Mount Lemmon	Mount Lemmon Survey	·	2.3 km	MPC · JPL
456364	2006 TW_{112}	—	February 25, 2004	Desert Eagle	W. K. Y. Yeung	·	1.4 km	MPC · JPL
456365	2006 TB_{114}	—	October 1, 2006	Apache Point	A. C. Becker	·	880 m	MPC · JPL
456366	2006 TT_{121}	—	October 2, 2006	Mount Lemmon	Mount Lemmon Survey	·	880 m	MPC · JPL
456367	2006 TP_{122}	—	October 11, 2006	Palomar	NEAT	·	2.1 km	MPC · JPL
456368	2006 US_{1}	—	October 16, 2006	Kitami	K. Endate	·	2.7 km	MPC · JPL
456369	2006 UE_{14}	—	September 30, 2006	Mount Lemmon	Mount Lemmon Survey	·	1.6 km	MPC · JPL
456370	2006 UT_{15}	—	October 17, 2006	Mount Lemmon	Mount Lemmon Survey	·	1.5 km	MPC · JPL
456371	2006 UK_{23}	—	October 16, 2006	Kitt Peak	Spacewatch	·	1.2 km	MPC · JPL
456372	2006 UL_{24}	—	October 4, 2006	Mount Lemmon	Mount Lemmon Survey	·	1.1 km	MPC · JPL
456373	2006 UO_{44}	—	October 16, 2006	Kitt Peak	Spacewatch	·	1.1 km	MPC · JPL
456374	2006 UX_{44}	—	September 30, 2006	Mount Lemmon	Mount Lemmon Survey	·	1.8 km	MPC · JPL
456375	2006 UJ_{48}	—	October 17, 2006	Kitt Peak	Spacewatch	·	1.6 km	MPC · JPL
456376	2006 UP_{53}	—	October 17, 2006	Mount Lemmon	Mount Lemmon Survey	·	2.2 km	MPC · JPL
456377	2006 UU_{57}	—	October 18, 2006	Kitt Peak	Spacewatch	·	1.4 km	MPC · JPL
456378 Akashikaikyo	2006 UA_{62}	Akashikaikyo	October 18, 2006	Vallemare Borbona	V. S. Casulli	EUN	860 m	MPC · JPL
456379	2006 US_{76}	—	September 30, 2006	Kitt Peak	Spacewatch	·	1.2 km	MPC · JPL
456380	2006 UO_{78}	—	October 17, 2006	Kitt Peak	Spacewatch	(5)	1.0 km	MPC · JPL
456381	2006 UK_{79}	—	October 17, 2006	Kitt Peak	Spacewatch	·	1.1 km	MPC · JPL
456382	2006 UK_{81}	—	October 4, 2006	Mount Lemmon	Mount Lemmon Survey	·	1.4 km	MPC · JPL
456383	2006 UY_{83}	—	October 17, 2006	Kitt Peak	Spacewatch	·	1.2 km	MPC · JPL
456384	2006 UQ_{85}	—	October 17, 2006	Kitt Peak	Spacewatch	·	1.2 km	MPC · JPL
456385	2006 UY_{91}	—	September 26, 2006	Mount Lemmon	Mount Lemmon Survey	·	1.3 km	MPC · JPL
456386	2006 UF_{93}	—	September 30, 2006	Mount Lemmon	Mount Lemmon Survey	·	1.3 km	MPC · JPL
456387	2006 UV_{122}	—	October 19, 2006	Kitt Peak	Spacewatch	·	820 m	MPC · JPL
456388	2006 UY_{138}	—	October 19, 2006	Kitt Peak	Spacewatch	·	1.0 km	MPC · JPL
456389	2006 UX_{139}	—	October 19, 2006	Kitt Peak	Spacewatch	·	1.3 km	MPC · JPL
456390	2006 UL_{140}	—	October 19, 2006	Kitt Peak	Spacewatch	MAR	820 m	MPC · JPL
456391	2006 UQ_{149}	—	September 19, 2006	Kitt Peak	Spacewatch	·	850 m	MPC · JPL
456392	2006 UW_{149}	—	September 27, 2006	Catalina	CSS	·	1.9 km	MPC · JPL
456393	2006 UE_{150}	—	October 20, 2006	Catalina	CSS	·	1.5 km	MPC · JPL
456394	2006 UG_{170}	—	October 21, 2006	Mount Lemmon	Mount Lemmon Survey	(5)	1.0 km	MPC · JPL
456395	2006 UU_{179}	—	October 16, 2006	Catalina	CSS	·	1.3 km	MPC · JPL
456396	2006 UX_{179}	—	October 16, 2006	Catalina	CSS	·	1.5 km	MPC · JPL
456397	2006 UQ_{183}	—	October 17, 2006	Catalina	CSS	·	2.0 km	MPC · JPL
456398	2006 UX_{190}	—	October 19, 2006	Catalina	CSS	·	1.2 km	MPC · JPL
456399	2006 UE_{199}	—	October 20, 2006	Kitt Peak	Spacewatch	·	1.7 km	MPC · JPL
456400	2006 UK_{204}	—	October 22, 2006	Palomar	NEAT	·	1.9 km	MPC · JPL

== 456401–456500 ==
back to top

Designation			Discovery			Properties		Ref
Permanent	Provisional	Named after	Date	Site	Discoverer(s)	Category	Diam.	Ref
456401	2006 UP_{207}	—	October 23, 2006	Palomar	NEAT	·	1.4 km	MPC · JPL
456402	2006 UY_{210}	—	October 23, 2006	Kitt Peak	Spacewatch	(5)	1.0 km	MPC · JPL
456403	2006 US_{211}	—	October 23, 2006	Kitt Peak	Spacewatch	·	1.0 km	MPC · JPL
456404	2006 UA_{220}	—	September 30, 2006	Catalina	CSS	MIS	2.4 km	MPC · JPL
456405	2006 UH_{220}	—	October 16, 2006	Kitt Peak	Spacewatch	(5)	1.3 km	MPC · JPL
456406	2006 US_{231}	—	October 4, 2006	Mount Lemmon	Mount Lemmon Survey	·	1.1 km	MPC · JPL
456407	2006 UL_{240}	—	October 2, 2006	Mount Lemmon	Mount Lemmon Survey	·	1.1 km	MPC · JPL
456408	2006 UP_{247}	—	October 17, 2006	Kitt Peak	Spacewatch	MAR	950 m	MPC · JPL
456409	2006 UF_{250}	—	October 27, 2006	Mount Lemmon	Mount Lemmon Survey	(11882)	1.4 km	MPC · JPL
456410	2006 UA_{268}	—	October 19, 2006	Catalina	CSS	·	1.4 km	MPC · JPL
456411	2006 UC_{268}	—	October 27, 2006	Mount Lemmon	Mount Lemmon Survey	·	1.0 km	MPC · JPL
456412	2006 UN_{275}	—	October 28, 2006	Kitt Peak	Spacewatch	·	850 m	MPC · JPL
456413	2006 UR_{282}	—	October 28, 2006	Kitt Peak	Spacewatch	·	1.7 km	MPC · JPL
456414	2006 UU_{284}	—	September 27, 2006	Mount Lemmon	Mount Lemmon Survey	·	1.3 km	MPC · JPL
456415	2006 UC_{285}	—	October 28, 2006	Kitt Peak	Spacewatch	·	1.1 km	MPC · JPL
456416	2006 UD_{322}	—	October 16, 2006	Kitt Peak	Spacewatch	KON	2.1 km	MPC · JPL
456417	2006 UU_{328}	—	October 19, 2006	Mount Lemmon	Mount Lemmon Survey	·	1.4 km	MPC · JPL
456418	2006 UG_{333}	—	September 14, 2006	Kitt Peak	Spacewatch	PHO	1.0 km	MPC · JPL
456419	2006 UM_{334}	—	October 19, 2006	Mount Lemmon	Mount Lemmon Survey	·	1.3 km	MPC · JPL
456420	2006 UB_{335}	—	October 23, 2006	Mount Lemmon	Mount Lemmon Survey	·	2.7 km	MPC · JPL
456421	2006 UA_{336}	—	October 20, 2006	Kitt Peak	Spacewatch	·	990 m	MPC · JPL
456422	2006 UW_{348}	—	September 25, 2006	Mount Lemmon	Mount Lemmon Survey	·	1.5 km	MPC · JPL
456423	2006 UU_{360}	—	October 22, 2006	Mount Lemmon	Mount Lemmon Survey	·	1.4 km	MPC · JPL
456424	2006 VQ_{3}	—	October 3, 2006	Mount Lemmon	Mount Lemmon Survey	·	1.4 km	MPC · JPL
456425	2006 VY_{10}	—	November 11, 2006	Mount Lemmon	Mount Lemmon Survey	·	1.1 km	MPC · JPL
456426	2006 VR_{16}	—	September 30, 2006	Mount Lemmon	Mount Lemmon Survey	·	1.0 km	MPC · JPL
456427	2006 VE_{17}	—	October 21, 2006	Kitt Peak	Spacewatch	·	1.3 km	MPC · JPL
456428	2006 VX_{17}	—	October 13, 2006	Kitt Peak	Spacewatch	·	1.3 km	MPC · JPL
456429	2006 VJ_{24}	—	November 10, 2006	Kitt Peak	Spacewatch	·	1.4 km	MPC · JPL
456430	2006 VL_{27}	—	October 21, 2006	Kitt Peak	Spacewatch	·	1.3 km	MPC · JPL
456431	2006 VX_{27}	—	November 10, 2006	Kitt Peak	Spacewatch	·	1.4 km	MPC · JPL
456432	2006 VQ_{28}	—	October 19, 2006	Mount Lemmon	Mount Lemmon Survey	EUN	970 m	MPC · JPL
456433	2006 VS_{28}	—	November 10, 2006	Kitt Peak	Spacewatch	·	1.6 km	MPC · JPL
456434	2006 VY_{28}	—	November 10, 2006	Kitt Peak	Spacewatch	·	2.4 km	MPC · JPL
456435	2006 VR_{31}	—	November 11, 2006	Kitt Peak	Spacewatch	·	1.3 km	MPC · JPL
456436	2006 VZ_{35}	—	November 11, 2006	Mount Lemmon	Mount Lemmon Survey	·	940 m	MPC · JPL
456437	2006 VD_{36}	—	September 28, 2006	Mount Lemmon	Mount Lemmon Survey	·	1.4 km	MPC · JPL
456438	2006 VY_{46}	—	November 1, 2006	Mount Lemmon	Mount Lemmon Survey	MIS	1.7 km	MPC · JPL
456439	2006 VO_{47}	—	November 9, 2006	Kitt Peak	Spacewatch	·	1.0 km	MPC · JPL
456440	2006 VY_{59}	—	November 11, 2006	Kitt Peak	Spacewatch	·	1.0 km	MPC · JPL
456441	2006 VP_{61}	—	November 11, 2006	Kitt Peak	Spacewatch	·	1.9 km	MPC · JPL
456442	2006 VF_{63}	—	November 11, 2006	Kitt Peak	Spacewatch	DOR	2.0 km	MPC · JPL
456443	2006 VZ_{66}	—	October 2, 2006	Mount Lemmon	Mount Lemmon Survey	·	2.2 km	MPC · JPL
456444	2006 VM_{68}	—	November 11, 2006	Kitt Peak	Spacewatch	MIS	1.5 km	MPC · JPL
456445	2006 VB_{77}	—	November 12, 2006	Mount Lemmon	Mount Lemmon Survey	(5)	1.0 km	MPC · JPL
456446	2006 VW_{84}	—	October 29, 2006	Catalina	CSS	·	1.4 km	MPC · JPL
456447	2006 VG_{87}	—	October 31, 2006	Kitt Peak	Spacewatch	·	2.0 km	MPC · JPL
456448	2006 VD_{96}	—	September 27, 2006	Mount Lemmon	Mount Lemmon Survey	·	1.5 km	MPC · JPL
456449	2006 VV_{97}	—	November 11, 2006	Kitt Peak	Spacewatch	·	970 m	MPC · JPL
456450	2006 VN_{101}	—	November 11, 2006	Palomar	NEAT	·	990 m	MPC · JPL
456451	2006 VG_{102}	—	November 12, 2006	Mount Lemmon	Mount Lemmon Survey	·	960 m	MPC · JPL
456452	2006 VR_{108}	—	October 4, 2006	Mount Lemmon	Mount Lemmon Survey	(5)	1.1 km	MPC · JPL
456453	2006 VS_{108}	—	November 13, 2006	Kitt Peak	Spacewatch	·	1.3 km	MPC · JPL
456454	2006 VR_{109}	—	September 19, 2006	Catalina	CSS	·	1.6 km	MPC · JPL
456455	2006 VF_{112}	—	November 13, 2006	Palomar	NEAT	·	3.1 km	MPC · JPL
456456	2006 VZ_{122}	—	November 10, 2006	Kitt Peak	Spacewatch	·	2.9 km	MPC · JPL
456457	2006 VL_{125}	—	November 14, 2006	Kitt Peak	Spacewatch	(1547)	1.4 km	MPC · JPL
456458	2006 VY_{125}	—	November 15, 2006	Kitt Peak	Spacewatch	·	1.7 km	MPC · JPL
456459	2006 VZ_{125}	—	November 15, 2006	Kitt Peak	Spacewatch	·	1.1 km	MPC · JPL
456460	2006 VK_{128}	—	November 15, 2006	Kitt Peak	Spacewatch	·	1.5 km	MPC · JPL
456461	2006 VW_{131}	—	October 22, 2006	Mount Lemmon	Mount Lemmon Survey	·	1.6 km	MPC · JPL
456462	2006 VU_{135}	—	November 15, 2006	Kitt Peak	Spacewatch	·	1.0 km	MPC · JPL
456463	2006 VK_{136}	—	August 24, 2001	Kitt Peak	Spacewatch	·	1.4 km	MPC · JPL
456464	2006 VS_{137}	—	November 15, 2006	Kitt Peak	Spacewatch	·	1.3 km	MPC · JPL
456465	2006 VC_{140}	—	November 15, 2006	Kitt Peak	Spacewatch	·	1.7 km	MPC · JPL
456466	2006 VA_{170}	—	November 11, 2006	Mount Lemmon	Mount Lemmon Survey	·	1.3 km	MPC · JPL
456467	2006 WO_{8}	—	November 16, 2006	Kitt Peak	Spacewatch	(5)	1.0 km	MPC · JPL
456468	2006 WV_{14}	—	November 16, 2006	Kitt Peak	Spacewatch	·	1.2 km	MPC · JPL
456469	2006 WO_{15}	—	September 26, 2006	Mount Lemmon	Mount Lemmon Survey	·	1.3 km	MPC · JPL
456470	2006 WP_{37}	—	October 3, 2006	Mount Lemmon	Mount Lemmon Survey	AEO	850 m	MPC · JPL
456471	2006 WL_{40}	—	September 27, 2006	Mount Lemmon	Mount Lemmon Survey	·	1.3 km	MPC · JPL
456472	2006 WM_{40}	—	November 16, 2006	Kitt Peak	Spacewatch	·	1.0 km	MPC · JPL
456473	2006 WU_{41}	—	October 2, 2006	Mount Lemmon	Mount Lemmon Survey	·	1.0 km	MPC · JPL
456474	2006 WV_{59}	—	October 21, 2006	Kitt Peak	Spacewatch	·	1.3 km	MPC · JPL
456475	2006 WM_{60}	—	November 17, 2006	Catalina	CSS	·	1.7 km	MPC · JPL
456476	2006 WK_{67}	—	November 17, 2006	Mount Lemmon	Mount Lemmon Survey	3:2	5.1 km	MPC · JPL
456477	2006 WJ_{70}	—	November 18, 2006	Kitt Peak	Spacewatch	·	970 m	MPC · JPL
456478	2006 WA_{72}	—	November 18, 2006	Kitt Peak	Spacewatch	(5)	960 m	MPC · JPL
456479	2006 WP_{78}	—	November 18, 2006	Kitt Peak	Spacewatch	·	2.1 km	MPC · JPL
456480	2006 WU_{92}	—	August 30, 2005	Kitt Peak	Spacewatch	3:2	4.2 km	MPC · JPL
456481	2006 WJ_{97}	—	November 19, 2006	Kitt Peak	Spacewatch	·	840 m	MPC · JPL
456482	2006 WL_{99}	—	October 23, 2006	Mount Lemmon	Mount Lemmon Survey	·	1.8 km	MPC · JPL
456483	2006 WW_{102}	—	November 19, 2006	Kitt Peak	Spacewatch	·	1.3 km	MPC · JPL
456484	2006 WJ_{114}	—	November 20, 2006	Kitt Peak	Spacewatch	·	1.1 km	MPC · JPL
456485	2006 WG_{116}	—	October 27, 2006	Kitt Peak	Spacewatch	·	1.3 km	MPC · JPL
456486	2006 WJ_{124}	—	November 22, 2006	Mount Lemmon	Mount Lemmon Survey	·	1.2 km	MPC · JPL
456487	2006 WT_{132}	—	November 10, 2006	Kitt Peak	Spacewatch	·	970 m	MPC · JPL
456488	2006 WM_{138}	—	November 19, 2006	Socorro	LINEAR	·	2.3 km	MPC · JPL
456489	2006 WE_{139}	—	October 30, 2006	Catalina	CSS	·	1.3 km	MPC · JPL
456490	2006 WS_{140}	—	November 20, 2006	Kitt Peak	Spacewatch	·	1.5 km	MPC · JPL
456491	2006 WJ_{148}	—	November 15, 2006	Catalina	CSS	·	1.7 km	MPC · JPL
456492	2006 WF_{151}	—	November 21, 2006	Mount Lemmon	Mount Lemmon Survey	·	2.0 km	MPC · JPL
456493	2006 WA_{154}	—	November 22, 2006	Mount Lemmon	Mount Lemmon Survey	·	1.2 km	MPC · JPL
456494	2006 WG_{160}	—	November 22, 2006	Mount Lemmon	Mount Lemmon Survey	EUN	1.5 km	MPC · JPL
456495	2006 WR_{164}	—	November 1, 2006	Mount Lemmon	Mount Lemmon Survey	·	1.2 km	MPC · JPL
456496	2006 WH_{180}	—	November 24, 2006	Mount Lemmon	Mount Lemmon Survey	·	1.3 km	MPC · JPL
456497	2006 WQ_{180}	—	November 24, 2006	Mount Lemmon	Mount Lemmon Survey	·	1.5 km	MPC · JPL
456498	2006 WS_{181}	—	November 24, 2006	Mount Lemmon	Mount Lemmon Survey	·	2.5 km	MPC · JPL
456499	2006 WW_{183}	—	November 2, 2006	Mount Lemmon	Mount Lemmon Survey	·	1.6 km	MPC · JPL
456500	2006 WX_{191}	—	October 31, 2006	Mount Lemmon	Mount Lemmon Survey	EUN	1.2 km	MPC · JPL

== 456501–456600 ==
back to top

Designation			Discovery			Properties		Ref
Permanent	Provisional	Named after	Date	Site	Discoverer(s)	Category	Diam.	Ref
456501	2006 WB_{199}	—	November 17, 2006	Mount Lemmon	Mount Lemmon Survey	·	1.2 km	MPC · JPL
456502	2006 WH_{199}	—	November 16, 2006	Kitt Peak	Spacewatch	·	1.6 km	MPC · JPL
456503	2006 WY_{201}	—	November 25, 2006	Mount Lemmon	Mount Lemmon Survey	·	1.1 km	MPC · JPL
456504	2006 WR_{202}	—	November 18, 2006	Kitt Peak	Spacewatch	·	1.2 km	MPC · JPL
456505	2006 XK_{12}	—	December 10, 2006	Kitt Peak	Spacewatch	(1547)	1.4 km	MPC · JPL
456506	2006 XK_{24}	—	December 12, 2006	Kitt Peak	Spacewatch	EUN	1.4 km	MPC · JPL
456507	2006 XG_{29}	—	December 13, 2006	Mount Lemmon	Mount Lemmon Survey	·	1.4 km	MPC · JPL
456508	2006 XV_{29}	—	December 13, 2006	Mount Lemmon	Mount Lemmon Survey	·	1.8 km	MPC · JPL
456509	2006 XJ_{39}	—	December 11, 2006	Kitt Peak	Spacewatch	·	1.7 km	MPC · JPL
456510	2006 XW_{40}	—	November 19, 2006	Catalina	CSS	JUN	1.0 km	MPC · JPL
456511	2006 XA_{53}	—	December 14, 2006	Mount Lemmon	Mount Lemmon Survey	·	1.5 km	MPC · JPL
456512	2006 XX_{62}	—	November 25, 2006	Mount Lemmon	Mount Lemmon Survey	·	1.7 km	MPC · JPL
456513	2006 XR_{64}	—	December 12, 2006	Palomar	NEAT	·	1.6 km	MPC · JPL
456514	2006 XD_{72}	—	December 1, 2006	Mount Lemmon	Mount Lemmon Survey	·	1.2 km	MPC · JPL
456515	2006 XM_{73}	—	December 15, 2006	Kitt Peak	Spacewatch	DOR	2.2 km	MPC · JPL
456516	2006 YJ_{12}	—	November 27, 2006	Mount Lemmon	Mount Lemmon Survey	MRX	1.1 km	MPC · JPL
456517	2006 YG_{19}	—	December 24, 2006	Mount Lemmon	Mount Lemmon Survey	EUN	1.1 km	MPC · JPL
456518	2006 YT_{21}	—	October 21, 2006	Kitt Peak	Spacewatch	·	2.2 km	MPC · JPL
456519	2006 YL_{32}	—	December 21, 2006	Kitt Peak	Spacewatch	·	1.3 km	MPC · JPL
456520	2006 YP_{32}	—	August 31, 2005	Anderson Mesa	LONEOS	·	2.2 km	MPC · JPL
456521	2006 YS_{33}	—	December 15, 2006	Kitt Peak	Spacewatch	·	2.0 km	MPC · JPL
456522	2006 YE_{41}	—	August 29, 2005	Kitt Peak	Spacewatch	·	2.0 km	MPC · JPL
456523	2006 YX_{44}	—	December 16, 2006	Catalina	CSS	·	1.8 km	MPC · JPL
456524	2006 YC_{45}	—	November 17, 2006	Mount Lemmon	Mount Lemmon Survey	·	1.8 km	MPC · JPL
456525	2006 YR_{53}	—	December 26, 2006	Kitt Peak	Spacewatch	·	1.3 km	MPC · JPL
456526	2006 YC_{54}	—	December 27, 2006	Mount Lemmon	Mount Lemmon Survey	·	1.7 km	MPC · JPL
456527	2006 YK_{54}	—	December 20, 2006	Mount Lemmon	Mount Lemmon Survey	·	2.2 km	MPC · JPL
456528	2007 AP_{1}	—	December 24, 2006	Kitt Peak	Spacewatch	·	2.4 km	MPC · JPL
456529	2007 AL_{20}	—	January 10, 2007	Kitt Peak	Spacewatch	·	1.4 km	MPC · JPL
456530	2007 AV_{23}	—	November 28, 2006	Mount Lemmon	Mount Lemmon Survey	·	2.0 km	MPC · JPL
456531	2007 AC_{25}	—	November 25, 2006	Mount Lemmon	Mount Lemmon Survey	·	2.0 km	MPC · JPL
456532	2007 AX_{27}	—	November 28, 2006	Mount Lemmon	Mount Lemmon Survey	·	2.1 km	MPC · JPL
456533	2007 AS_{28}	—	January 9, 2007	Kitt Peak	Spacewatch	·	1.5 km	MPC · JPL
456534	2007 AG_{29}	—	January 10, 2007	Mount Lemmon	Mount Lemmon Survey	·	2.2 km	MPC · JPL
456535	2007 AJ_{30}	—	January 10, 2007	Mount Lemmon	Mount Lemmon Survey	DOR	2.7 km	MPC · JPL
456536	2007 BA	—	January 16, 2007	Catalina	CSS	AMO	560 m	MPC · JPL
456537	2007 BG	—	January 18, 2007	Siding Spring	SSS	ATE	310 m	MPC · JPL
456538	2007 BX_{1}	—	December 13, 2006	Kitt Peak	Spacewatch	·	1.3 km	MPC · JPL
456539	2007 BR_{2}	—	January 9, 2007	Kitt Peak	Spacewatch	EUN	1.4 km	MPC · JPL
456540	2007 BA_{6}	—	January 17, 2007	Palomar	NEAT	EUN	1.3 km	MPC · JPL
456541	2007 BN_{9}	—	November 15, 2006	Mount Lemmon	Mount Lemmon Survey	·	2.1 km	MPC · JPL
456542	2007 BK_{10}	—	January 17, 2007	Kitt Peak	Spacewatch	·	1.9 km	MPC · JPL
456543	2007 BG_{12}	—	January 17, 2007	Kitt Peak	Spacewatch	·	2.0 km	MPC · JPL
456544	2007 BE_{18}	—	January 10, 2007	Catalina	CSS	·	1.9 km	MPC · JPL
456545	2007 BG_{18}	—	January 9, 2007	Kitt Peak	Spacewatch	·	2.6 km	MPC · JPL
456546	2007 BX_{24}	—	January 9, 2007	Mount Lemmon	Mount Lemmon Survey	·	1.6 km	MPC · JPL
456547	2007 BX_{27}	—	January 24, 2007	Mount Lemmon	Mount Lemmon Survey	·	1.6 km	MPC · JPL
456548	2007 BC_{42}	—	January 9, 2007	Kitt Peak	Spacewatch	·	2.0 km	MPC · JPL
456549	2007 BS_{47}	—	January 17, 2007	Kitt Peak	Spacewatch	·	2.6 km	MPC · JPL
456550	2007 BP_{53}	—	January 17, 2007	Kitt Peak	Spacewatch	·	1.4 km	MPC · JPL
456551	2007 BL_{55}	—	November 17, 2006	Mount Lemmon	Mount Lemmon Survey	·	2.0 km	MPC · JPL
456552	2007 BF_{57}	—	January 24, 2007	Socorro	LINEAR	·	2.7 km	MPC · JPL
456553	2007 BS_{58}	—	December 24, 2006	Mount Lemmon	Mount Lemmon Survey	·	2.1 km	MPC · JPL
456554	2007 BV_{61}	—	January 27, 2007	Mount Lemmon	Mount Lemmon Survey	·	1.2 km	MPC · JPL
456555	2007 BJ_{62}	—	January 27, 2007	Catalina	CSS	·	2.5 km	MPC · JPL
456556	2007 BU_{76}	—	December 21, 2006	Mount Lemmon	Mount Lemmon Survey	·	1.5 km	MPC · JPL
456557	2007 BW_{77}	—	January 17, 2007	Kitt Peak	Spacewatch	·	2.0 km	MPC · JPL
456558	2007 BE_{100}	—	January 17, 2007	Kitt Peak	Spacewatch	WIT	820 m	MPC · JPL
456559	2007 BC_{101}	—	January 27, 2007	Mount Lemmon	Mount Lemmon Survey	GEF	1.5 km	MPC · JPL
456560	2007 CT_{1}	—	January 8, 2007	Kitt Peak	Spacewatch	MAR	1.2 km	MPC · JPL
456561	2007 CE_{6}	—	February 6, 2007	Kitt Peak	Spacewatch	·	1.6 km	MPC · JPL
456562	2007 CX_{6}	—	February 6, 2007	Kitt Peak	Spacewatch	EUN	1.7 km	MPC · JPL
456563	2007 CO_{16}	—	February 7, 2007	Mount Lemmon	Mount Lemmon Survey	·	1.5 km	MPC · JPL
456564	2007 CQ_{16}	—	January 8, 2007	Mount Lemmon	Mount Lemmon Survey	ADE	1.7 km	MPC · JPL
456565	2007 CH_{20}	—	February 6, 2007	Mount Lemmon	Mount Lemmon Survey	·	1.5 km	MPC · JPL
456566	2007 CC_{21}	—	December 21, 2006	Mount Lemmon	Mount Lemmon Survey	·	2.2 km	MPC · JPL
456567	2007 CN_{30}	—	January 25, 2007	Kitt Peak	Spacewatch	·	2.4 km	MPC · JPL
456568	2007 CD_{32}	—	October 1, 2005	Kitt Peak	Spacewatch	·	1.3 km	MPC · JPL
456569	2007 CH_{33}	—	January 27, 2007	Kitt Peak	Spacewatch	·	1.6 km	MPC · JPL
456570	2007 CO_{44}	—	January 25, 2007	Kitt Peak	Spacewatch	·	1.6 km	MPC · JPL
456571	2007 DY_{3}	—	February 16, 2007	Mount Lemmon	Mount Lemmon Survey	·	1.6 km	MPC · JPL
456572	2007 DB_{13}	—	January 17, 2007	Kitt Peak	Spacewatch	·	2.0 km	MPC · JPL
456573	2007 DQ_{16}	—	February 17, 2007	Kitt Peak	Spacewatch	·	2.1 km	MPC · JPL
456574	2007 DV_{16}	—	February 17, 2007	Kitt Peak	Spacewatch	KOR	1.1 km	MPC · JPL
456575	2007 DW_{18}	—	February 17, 2007	Kitt Peak	Spacewatch	·	1.5 km	MPC · JPL
456576	2007 DV_{20}	—	February 17, 2007	Kitt Peak	Spacewatch	·	2.0 km	MPC · JPL
456577	2007 DZ_{21}	—	February 17, 2007	Kitt Peak	Spacewatch	·	1.3 km	MPC · JPL
456578	2007 DL_{27}	—	February 17, 2007	Kitt Peak	Spacewatch	·	1.7 km	MPC · JPL
456579	2007 DK_{28}	—	February 17, 2007	Kitt Peak	Spacewatch	·	1.5 km	MPC · JPL
456580	2007 DF_{32}	—	December 27, 2006	Mount Lemmon	Mount Lemmon Survey	·	1.7 km	MPC · JPL
456581	2007 DG_{33}	—	February 17, 2007	Kitt Peak	Spacewatch	·	2.1 km	MPC · JPL
456582	2007 DU_{34}	—	February 17, 2007	Kitt Peak	Spacewatch	·	1.7 km	MPC · JPL
456583	2007 DJ_{39}	—	February 17, 2007	Kitt Peak	Spacewatch	·	1.7 km	MPC · JPL
456584	2007 DC_{50}	—	February 16, 2007	Catalina	CSS	·	2.4 km	MPC · JPL
456585	2007 DK_{51}	—	February 17, 2007	Socorro	LINEAR	·	2.6 km	MPC · JPL
456586	2007 DL_{55}	—	February 21, 2007	Kitt Peak	Spacewatch	KOR	1.4 km	MPC · JPL
456587	2007 DU_{58}	—	February 9, 2007	Kitt Peak	Spacewatch	·	2.1 km	MPC · JPL
456588	2007 DH_{60}	—	February 17, 2007	Catalina	CSS	·	1.7 km	MPC · JPL
456589	2007 DN_{60}	—	February 22, 2007	Anderson Mesa	LONEOS	EUN	1.5 km	MPC · JPL
456590	2007 DD_{93}	—	January 17, 2007	Mount Lemmon	Mount Lemmon Survey	·	1.8 km	MPC · JPL
456591	2007 DO_{103}	—	February 9, 2007	Kitt Peak	Spacewatch	GEF	1.2 km	MPC · JPL
456592	2007 ES_{12}	—	February 21, 2007	Mount Lemmon	Mount Lemmon Survey	·	1.7 km	MPC · JPL
456593	2007 EX_{14}	—	March 9, 2007	Mount Lemmon	Mount Lemmon Survey	·	1.5 km	MPC · JPL
456594	2007 EB_{25}	—	March 10, 2007	Mount Lemmon	Mount Lemmon Survey	·	2.3 km	MPC · JPL
456595	2007 EJ_{41}	—	February 17, 2007	Mount Lemmon	Mount Lemmon Survey	·	2.2 km	MPC · JPL
456596	2007 EO_{75}	—	March 10, 2007	Kitt Peak	Spacewatch	·	2.2 km	MPC · JPL
456597	2007 EF_{82}	—	March 11, 2007	Anderson Mesa	LONEOS	·	2.2 km	MPC · JPL
456598	2007 EQ_{104}	—	March 11, 2007	Mount Lemmon	Mount Lemmon Survey	DOR	1.7 km	MPC · JPL
456599	2007 ET_{138}	—	January 27, 2007	Mount Lemmon	Mount Lemmon Survey	·	1.7 km	MPC · JPL
456600	2007 ED_{146}	—	March 12, 2007	Mount Lemmon	Mount Lemmon Survey	·	1.5 km	MPC · JPL

== 456601–456700 ==
back to top

Designation			Discovery			Properties		Ref
Permanent	Provisional	Named after	Date	Site	Discoverer(s)	Category	Diam.	Ref
456601	2007 EE_{146}	—	March 12, 2007	Mount Lemmon	Mount Lemmon Survey	·	2.2 km	MPC · JPL
456602	2007 EY_{155}	—	March 12, 2007	Kitt Peak	Spacewatch	·	2.2 km	MPC · JPL
456603	2007 EB_{157}	—	March 12, 2007	Kitt Peak	Spacewatch	·	2.1 km	MPC · JPL
456604	2007 EK_{161}	—	March 15, 2007	Kitt Peak	Spacewatch	·	1.9 km	MPC · JPL
456605	2007 ER_{188}	—	February 23, 2007	Kitt Peak	Spacewatch	·	2.0 km	MPC · JPL
456606	2007 EV_{217}	—	March 13, 2007	Kitt Peak	Spacewatch	·	2.3 km	MPC · JPL
456607	2007 ET_{218}	—	March 11, 2007	Catalina	CSS	·	2.1 km	MPC · JPL
456608	2007 FU_{7}	—	March 9, 2007	Kitt Peak	Spacewatch	KOR	1.3 km	MPC · JPL
456609	2007 FR_{35}	—	March 16, 2007	Catalina	CSS	·	3.6 km	MPC · JPL
456610	2007 FL_{42}	—	March 28, 2007	Socorro	LINEAR	·	2.5 km	MPC · JPL
456611	2007 GV_{11}	—	March 11, 2007	Kitt Peak	Spacewatch	·	2.5 km	MPC · JPL
456612	2007 GD_{14}	—	April 11, 2007	Kitt Peak	Spacewatch	·	1.9 km	MPC · JPL
456613	2007 GE_{36}	—	March 16, 2007	Mount Lemmon	Mount Lemmon Survey	·	2.1 km	MPC · JPL
456614	2007 GP_{39}	—	April 14, 2007	Kitt Peak	Spacewatch	·	2.0 km	MPC · JPL
456615	2007 GQ_{60}	—	April 15, 2007	Kitt Peak	Spacewatch	·	3.4 km	MPC · JPL
456616	2007 GB_{71}	—	March 26, 2007	Kitt Peak	Spacewatch	·	1.7 km	MPC · JPL
456617	2007 GK_{77}	—	April 14, 2007	Kitt Peak	Spacewatch	·	2.1 km	MPC · JPL
456618	2007 HB	—	April 16, 2007	Mount Lemmon	Mount Lemmon Survey	AMO	390 m	MPC · JPL
456619	2007 HU_{3}	—	April 16, 2007	Catalina	CSS	·	2.0 km	MPC · JPL
456620	2007 HQ_{40}	—	April 20, 2007	Kitt Peak	Spacewatch	·	2.2 km	MPC · JPL
456621	2007 HE_{41}	—	April 20, 2007	Mount Lemmon	Mount Lemmon Survey	·	3.3 km	MPC · JPL
456622	2007 HW_{41}	—	March 25, 2007	Mount Lemmon	Mount Lemmon Survey	THM	2.1 km	MPC · JPL
456623	2007 HU_{74}	—	April 14, 2007	Kitt Peak	Spacewatch	·	3.0 km	MPC · JPL
456624	2007 HS_{95}	—	April 18, 2007	Mount Lemmon	Mount Lemmon Survey	·	2.8 km	MPC · JPL
456625	2007 JR_{19}	—	April 11, 2007	Kitt Peak	Spacewatch	·	2.7 km	MPC · JPL
456626	2007 JL_{25}	—	May 9, 2007	Kitt Peak	Spacewatch	VER	2.4 km	MPC · JPL
456627 Cristianmartins	2007 KE_{7}	Cristianmartins	May 21, 2007	Charleston	Astronomical Research Observatory	GEF	1.2 km	MPC · JPL
456628	2007 LG_{16}	—	June 10, 2007	Kitt Peak	Spacewatch	EOS	2.2 km	MPC · JPL
456629	2007 LK_{19}	—	April 24, 2007	Mount Lemmon	Mount Lemmon Survey	·	2.9 km	MPC · JPL
456630	2007 LP_{33}	—	June 10, 2007	Catalina	CSS	·	4.2 km	MPC · JPL
456631	2007 PN_{11}	—	August 9, 2007	Socorro	LINEAR	·	840 m	MPC · JPL
456632	2007 PJ_{15}	—	August 8, 2007	Socorro	LINEAR	·	3.3 km	MPC · JPL
456633	2007 PJ_{19}	—	July 19, 2007	Mount Lemmon	Mount Lemmon Survey	·	1.4 km	MPC · JPL
456634	2007 PE_{25}	—	August 10, 2007	Reedy Creek	J. Broughton	·	1.2 km	MPC · JPL
456635	2007 PD_{38}	—	August 13, 2007	Socorro	LINEAR	·	2.1 km	MPC · JPL
456636	2007 PN_{45}	—	April 7, 2006	Kitt Peak	Spacewatch	PHO	1.4 km	MPC · JPL
456637	2007 PR_{48}	—	August 10, 2007	Siding Spring	SSS	PHO	1.2 km	MPC · JPL
456638	2007 QN_{6}	—	August 21, 2007	Anderson Mesa	LONEOS	·	1.3 km	MPC · JPL
456639	2007 QP_{6}	—	August 23, 2007	Kitt Peak	Spacewatch	MAS	790 m	MPC · JPL
456640	2007 QJ_{9}	—	August 22, 2007	Socorro	LINEAR	·	1.2 km	MPC · JPL
456641	2007 QL_{9}	—	August 22, 2007	Socorro	LINEAR	·	930 m	MPC · JPL
456642	2007 QM_{13}	—	August 24, 2007	Kitt Peak	Spacewatch	·	840 m	MPC · JPL
456643	2007 QC_{15}	—	August 23, 2007	Kitt Peak	Spacewatch	·	3.8 km	MPC · JPL
456644	2007 QL_{17}	—	August 24, 2007	Kitt Peak	Spacewatch	·	1.1 km	MPC · JPL
456645	2007 RJ_{4}	—	September 3, 2007	Catalina	CSS	·	960 m	MPC · JPL
456646	2007 RJ_{5}	—	September 2, 2007	Siding Spring	K. Sárneczky, L. Kiss	·	2.7 km	MPC · JPL
456647	2007 RH_{15}	—	September 12, 2007	Dauban	Chante-Perdrix	·	1.1 km	MPC · JPL
456648	2007 RK_{18}	—	September 11, 2007	Kitt Peak	Spacewatch	·	1.1 km	MPC · JPL
456649	2007 RU_{18}	—	September 12, 2007	Dauban	Chante-Perdrix	·	1.1 km	MPC · JPL
456650	2007 RY_{18}	—	September 13, 2007	Dauban	Chante-Perdrix	NYS	1.4 km	MPC · JPL
456651	2007 RT_{19}	—	September 14, 2007	Socorro	LINEAR	AMO	750 m	MPC · JPL
456652	2007 RA_{21}	—	August 22, 2007	Anderson Mesa	LONEOS	MAS	760 m	MPC · JPL
456653	2007 RB_{21}	—	August 10, 2007	Kitt Peak	Spacewatch	MAS	650 m	MPC · JPL
456654	2007 RV_{22}	—	September 3, 2007	Catalina	CSS	NYS	940 m	MPC · JPL
456655	2007 RY_{23}	—	August 21, 2007	Anderson Mesa	LONEOS	·	910 m	MPC · JPL
456656	2007 RF_{33}	—	September 5, 2007	Catalina	CSS	V	770 m	MPC · JPL
456657	2007 RO_{33}	—	September 5, 2007	Catalina	CSS	ERI · slow	1.4 km	MPC · JPL
456658	2007 RF_{37}	—	September 8, 2007	Anderson Mesa	LONEOS	MAS	770 m	MPC · JPL
456659	2007 RL_{37}	—	September 8, 2007	Anderson Mesa	LONEOS	MAS	730 m	MPC · JPL
456660	2007 RN_{38}	—	September 8, 2007	Anderson Mesa	LONEOS	·	790 m	MPC · JPL
456661	2007 RD_{54}	—	September 9, 2007	Kitt Peak	Spacewatch	·	1.3 km	MPC · JPL
456662	2007 RF_{55}	—	September 9, 2007	Kitt Peak	Spacewatch	·	900 m	MPC · JPL
456663	2007 RJ_{55}	—	September 9, 2007	Anderson Mesa	LONEOS	·	1.3 km	MPC · JPL
456664	2007 RQ_{55}	—	September 9, 2007	Kitt Peak	Spacewatch	·	2.2 km	MPC · JPL
456665	2007 RH_{59}	—	September 10, 2007	Kitt Peak	Spacewatch	·	1.1 km	MPC · JPL
456666	2007 RO_{60}	—	September 10, 2007	Catalina	CSS	·	860 m	MPC · JPL
456667	2007 RK_{66}	—	August 10, 2007	Kitt Peak	Spacewatch	·	1.0 km	MPC · JPL
456668	2007 RX_{76}	—	September 10, 2007	Mount Lemmon	Mount Lemmon Survey	V	520 m	MPC · JPL
456669	2007 RJ_{78}	—	September 10, 2007	Mount Lemmon	Mount Lemmon Survey	·	850 m	MPC · JPL
456670	2007 RH_{80}	—	September 10, 2007	Mount Lemmon	Mount Lemmon Survey	·	2.1 km	MPC · JPL
456671	2007 RK_{82}	—	September 10, 2007	Mount Lemmon	Mount Lemmon Survey	·	980 m	MPC · JPL
456672	2007 RM_{82}	—	August 24, 2007	Kitt Peak	Spacewatch	·	590 m	MPC · JPL
456673	2007 RG_{91}	—	September 10, 2007	Mount Lemmon	Mount Lemmon Survey	·	1.1 km	MPC · JPL
456674	2007 RF_{98}	—	September 10, 2007	Kitt Peak	Spacewatch	V	580 m	MPC · JPL
456675	2007 RG_{112}	—	September 11, 2007	Mount Lemmon	Mount Lemmon Survey	NYS	960 m	MPC · JPL
456676	2007 RM_{112}	—	September 11, 2007	Mount Lemmon	Mount Lemmon Survey	·	670 m	MPC · JPL
456677 Yepeijian	2007 RM_{119}	Yepeijian	September 11, 2007	XuYi	PMO NEO Survey Program	·	1.2 km	MPC · JPL
456678	2007 RF_{124}	—	July 18, 2007	Mount Lemmon	Mount Lemmon Survey	·	1.2 km	MPC · JPL
456679	2007 RX_{126}	—	September 12, 2007	Mount Lemmon	Mount Lemmon Survey	MAS	730 m	MPC · JPL
456680	2007 RK_{134}	—	September 11, 2007	XuYi	PMO NEO Survey Program	·	1.2 km	MPC · JPL
456681	2007 RO_{134}	—	September 8, 2007	Anderson Mesa	LONEOS	·	1.0 km	MPC · JPL
456682	2007 RV_{139}	—	September 13, 2007	Socorro	LINEAR	NYS	1.2 km	MPC · JPL
456683	2007 RP_{151}	—	September 10, 2007	Kitt Peak	Spacewatch	LIX	4.5 km	MPC · JPL
456684	2007 RL_{156}	—	August 24, 2007	Kitt Peak	Spacewatch	VER	2.9 km	MPC · JPL
456685	2007 RZ_{156}	—	August 23, 2007	Kitt Peak	Spacewatch	·	1.1 km	MPC · JPL
456686	2007 RD_{158}	—	September 12, 2007	Catalina	CSS	NYS	1.2 km	MPC · JPL
456687	2007 RQ_{163}	—	September 10, 2007	Kitt Peak	Spacewatch	V	500 m	MPC · JPL
456688	2007 RR_{163}	—	September 10, 2007	Kitt Peak	Spacewatch	·	3.1 km	MPC · JPL
456689	2007 RU_{165}	—	September 10, 2007	Kitt Peak	Spacewatch	·	650 m	MPC · JPL
456690	2007 RY_{165}	—	September 10, 2007	Kitt Peak	Spacewatch	·	4.1 km	MPC · JPL
456691	2007 RE_{195}	—	September 12, 2007	Kitt Peak	Spacewatch	·	1.1 km	MPC · JPL
456692	2007 RJ_{206}	—	September 10, 2007	Kitt Peak	Spacewatch	·	840 m	MPC · JPL
456693	2007 RM_{207}	—	September 10, 2007	Kitt Peak	Spacewatch	·	1.2 km	MPC · JPL
456694	2007 RB_{210}	—	September 10, 2007	Kitt Peak	Spacewatch	·	950 m	MPC · JPL
456695 Xingdingyu	2007 RT_{212}	Xingdingyu	August 18, 2007	XuYi	PMO NEO Survey Program	·	1.3 km	MPC · JPL
456696	2007 RK_{213}	—	August 23, 2007	Kitt Peak	Spacewatch	MAS	640 m	MPC · JPL
456697	2007 RO_{219}	—	September 5, 2007	Catalina	CSS	·	1.2 km	MPC · JPL
456698	2007 RT_{223}	—	September 8, 2007	Mount Lemmon	Mount Lemmon Survey	·	940 m	MPC · JPL
456699	2007 RL_{234}	—	September 12, 2007	Catalina	CSS	ERI	1.8 km	MPC · JPL
456700	2007 RU_{240}	—	September 4, 2007	Catalina	CSS	·	1.4 km	MPC · JPL

== 456701–456800 ==
back to top

Designation			Discovery			Properties		Ref
Permanent	Provisional	Named after	Date	Site	Discoverer(s)	Category	Diam.	Ref
456701	2007 RV_{241}	—	September 13, 2007	Socorro	LINEAR	·	1.1 km	MPC · JPL
456702	2007 RL_{244}	—	September 11, 2007	Kitt Peak	Spacewatch	·	860 m	MPC · JPL
456703	2007 RM_{244}	—	September 11, 2007	Kitt Peak	Spacewatch	MAS	540 m	MPC · JPL
456704	2007 RY_{244}	—	September 11, 2007	Kitt Peak	Spacewatch	·	730 m	MPC · JPL
456705	2007 RZ_{251}	—	September 13, 2007	Kitt Peak	Spacewatch	·	1.2 km	MPC · JPL
456706	2007 RF_{253}	—	September 13, 2007	Mount Lemmon	Mount Lemmon Survey	·	1.1 km	MPC · JPL
456707	2007 RV_{265}	—	July 18, 2007	Mount Lemmon	Mount Lemmon Survey	·	940 m	MPC · JPL
456708	2007 RL_{273}	—	September 15, 2007	Kitt Peak	Spacewatch	NYS	1.2 km	MPC · JPL
456709	2007 RV_{286}	—	September 4, 2007	Mount Lemmon	Mount Lemmon Survey	MAS	570 m	MPC · JPL
456710	2007 RX_{287}	—	September 10, 2007	Kitt Peak	Spacewatch	·	850 m	MPC · JPL
456711	2007 RG_{289}	—	September 11, 2007	Purple Mountain	PMO NEO Survey Program	·	2.1 km	MPC · JPL
456712	2007 RD_{290}	—	September 3, 2007	Catalina	CSS	PHO	850 m	MPC · JPL
456713	2007 RU_{290}	—	September 11, 2007	Kitt Peak	Spacewatch	ERI	1.2 km	MPC · JPL
456714	2007 RF_{292}	—	September 12, 2007	Mount Lemmon	Mount Lemmon Survey	MAS	580 m	MPC · JPL
456715	2007 RG_{292}	—	September 12, 2007	Mount Lemmon	Mount Lemmon Survey	NYS	980 m	MPC · JPL
456716	2007 RY_{293}	—	September 13, 2007	Mount Lemmon	Mount Lemmon Survey	·	900 m	MPC · JPL
456717	2007 RV_{295}	—	September 14, 2007	Kitt Peak	Spacewatch	·	1.2 km	MPC · JPL
456718	2007 RP_{298}	—	September 10, 2007	Kitt Peak	Spacewatch	·	930 m	MPC · JPL
456719	2007 RL_{301}	—	September 13, 2007	Kitt Peak	Spacewatch	·	860 m	MPC · JPL
456720	2007 RY_{316}	—	September 9, 2007	Kitt Peak	Spacewatch	(2076)	710 m	MPC · JPL
456721	2007 RK_{318}	—	September 11, 2007	Kitt Peak	Spacewatch	MAS	660 m	MPC · JPL
456722	2007 RK_{322}	—	September 12, 2007	Catalina	CSS	·	1.0 km	MPC · JPL
456723	2007 RK_{323}	—	September 15, 2007	Kitt Peak	Spacewatch	·	1.1 km	MPC · JPL
456724	2007 SZ_{5}	—	September 21, 2007	Socorro	LINEAR	·	1.1 km	MPC · JPL
456725	2007 SF_{7}	—	September 11, 2007	Kitt Peak	Spacewatch	·	3.8 km	MPC · JPL
456726	2007 SO_{7}	—	September 18, 2007	Kitt Peak	Spacewatch	·	930 m	MPC · JPL
456727	2007 SY_{13}	—	September 20, 2007	Catalina	CSS	NYS	1.1 km	MPC · JPL
456728	2007 SA_{14}	—	September 20, 2007	Catalina	CSS	·	1.0 km	MPC · JPL
456729	2007 SC_{16}	—	September 10, 2007	Mount Lemmon	Mount Lemmon Survey	V	470 m	MPC · JPL
456730	2007 SQ_{22}	—	October 8, 2007	Mount Lemmon	Mount Lemmon Survey	MAS	700 m	MPC · JPL
456731 Uligrözinger	2007 TL_{8}	Uligrözinger	October 8, 2007	Heidelberg	F. Hormuth	·	1.1 km	MPC · JPL
456732	2007 TP_{9}	—	September 9, 2007	Mount Lemmon	Mount Lemmon Survey	·	1.1 km	MPC · JPL
456733	2007 TD_{12}	—	October 6, 2007	Socorro	LINEAR	·	1.3 km	MPC · JPL
456734	2007 TZ_{12}	—	October 6, 2007	Socorro	LINEAR	NYS	1.1 km	MPC · JPL
456735	2007 TA_{14}	—	October 7, 2007	Socorro	LINEAR	H	440 m	MPC · JPL
456736	2007 TG_{14}	—	September 14, 2007	Mount Lemmon	Mount Lemmon Survey	·	1.2 km	MPC · JPL
456737	2007 TU_{15}	—	October 5, 2007	Kitt Peak	Spacewatch	·	1.0 km	MPC · JPL
456738	2007 TX_{17}	—	September 25, 2007	Mount Lemmon	Mount Lemmon Survey	·	900 m	MPC · JPL
456739	2007 TR_{21}	—	September 12, 2007	Catalina	CSS	·	770 m	MPC · JPL
456740	2007 TF_{23}	—	September 5, 2007	Mount Lemmon	Mount Lemmon Survey	·	1.3 km	MPC · JPL
456741	2007 TV_{25}	—	October 4, 2007	Kitt Peak	Spacewatch	3:2	4.3 km	MPC · JPL
456742	2007 TU_{26}	—	September 11, 2007	Mount Lemmon	Mount Lemmon Survey	·	1.2 km	MPC · JPL
456743	2007 TS_{28}	—	October 4, 2007	Kitt Peak	Spacewatch	MAS	660 m	MPC · JPL
456744	2007 TG_{29}	—	October 4, 2007	Kitt Peak	Spacewatch	NYS	1.0 km	MPC · JPL
456745	2007 TA_{35}	—	October 6, 2007	Kitt Peak	Spacewatch	·	1.0 km	MPC · JPL
456746	2007 TM_{43}	—	September 18, 2007	Mount Lemmon	Mount Lemmon Survey	·	1 km	MPC · JPL
456747	2007 TF_{46}	—	October 7, 2007	Kitt Peak	Spacewatch	·	1.3 km	MPC · JPL
456748	2007 TA_{51}	—	September 14, 2007	Mount Lemmon	Mount Lemmon Survey	SYL · CYB	3.7 km	MPC · JPL
456749	2007 TN_{52}	—	September 8, 2007	Mount Lemmon	Mount Lemmon Survey	V	580 m	MPC · JPL
456750	2007 TM_{56}	—	October 4, 2007	Kitt Peak	Spacewatch	·	1.1 km	MPC · JPL
456751	2007 TP_{58}	—	August 23, 2007	Kitt Peak	Spacewatch	·	3.4 km	MPC · JPL
456752	2007 TF_{73}	—	October 8, 2007	Kitt Peak	Spacewatch	V	550 m	MPC · JPL
456753	2007 TY_{79}	—	October 7, 2007	Mount Lemmon	Mount Lemmon Survey	H	440 m	MPC · JPL
456754	2007 TQ_{80}	—	October 7, 2007	Catalina	CSS	·	960 m	MPC · JPL
456755	2007 TJ_{81}	—	September 5, 2007	Mount Lemmon	Mount Lemmon Survey	NYS	1 km	MPC · JPL
456756	2007 TX_{84}	—	September 25, 2007	Mount Lemmon	Mount Lemmon Survey	H	590 m	MPC · JPL
456757	2007 TZ_{91}	—	September 10, 2007	Kitt Peak	Spacewatch	·	1.3 km	MPC · JPL
456758	2007 TP_{93}	—	October 6, 2007	Kitt Peak	Spacewatch	MAS	750 m	MPC · JPL
456759	2007 TX_{93}	—	September 12, 2007	Mount Lemmon	Mount Lemmon Survey	·	800 m	MPC · JPL
456760	2007 TU_{94}	—	October 7, 2007	Catalina	CSS	·	1.2 km	MPC · JPL
456761	2007 TO_{98}	—	October 8, 2007	Mount Lemmon	Mount Lemmon Survey	·	3.1 km	MPC · JPL
456762	2007 TB_{99}	—	October 8, 2007	Mount Lemmon	Mount Lemmon Survey	·	1.1 km	MPC · JPL
456763	2007 TJ_{103}	—	October 8, 2007	Mount Lemmon	Mount Lemmon Survey	·	1.2 km	MPC · JPL
456764	2007 TW_{103}	—	October 8, 2007	Mount Lemmon	Mount Lemmon Survey	·	810 m	MPC · JPL
456765	2007 TL_{105}	—	September 5, 2007	Mount Lemmon	Mount Lemmon Survey	CLA	1.5 km	MPC · JPL
456766	2007 TV_{107}	—	September 13, 2007	Kitt Peak	Spacewatch	3:2 · SHU	3.9 km	MPC · JPL
456767	2007 TJ_{113}	—	October 8, 2007	Anderson Mesa	LONEOS	·	1.5 km	MPC · JPL
456768	2007 TO_{121}	—	October 6, 2007	Kitt Peak	Spacewatch	·	690 m	MPC · JPL
456769	2007 TW_{121}	—	October 6, 2007	Kitt Peak	Spacewatch	·	1.1 km	MPC · JPL
456770	2007 TC_{125}	—	October 6, 2007	Kitt Peak	Spacewatch	MAS	660 m	MPC · JPL
456771	2007 TE_{131}	—	October 7, 2007	Mount Lemmon	Mount Lemmon Survey	·	920 m	MPC · JPL
456772	2007 TW_{135}	—	September 2, 2007	Catalina	CSS	·	1.3 km	MPC · JPL
456773	2007 TQ_{143}	—	October 6, 2007	Socorro	LINEAR	·	4.5 km	MPC · JPL
456774	2007 TW_{143}	—	September 13, 2007	Kitt Peak	Spacewatch	·	870 m	MPC · JPL
456775	2007 TY_{144}	—	October 6, 2007	Socorro	LINEAR	·	910 m	MPC · JPL
456776	2007 TQ_{145}	—	September 25, 2007	Mount Lemmon	Mount Lemmon Survey	NYS	1.2 km	MPC · JPL
456777	2007 TS_{155}	—	October 9, 2007	Socorro	LINEAR	·	1.0 km	MPC · JPL
456778	2007 TQ_{157}	—	September 15, 2007	Anderson Mesa	LONEOS	·	930 m	MPC · JPL
456779	2007 TV_{162}	—	October 5, 2007	Kitt Peak	Spacewatch	·	960 m	MPC · JPL
456780	2007 TT_{169}	—	October 7, 2007	Catalina	CSS	·	1.2 km	MPC · JPL
456781	2007 TY_{170}	—	October 7, 2007	Mount Lemmon	Mount Lemmon Survey	·	710 m	MPC · JPL
456782	2007 TV_{171}	—	October 8, 2007	Anderson Mesa	LONEOS	NYS	1.0 km	MPC · JPL
456783	2007 TF_{174}	—	September 8, 2007	Mount Lemmon	Mount Lemmon Survey	CYB	5.2 km	MPC · JPL
456784	2007 TZ_{174}	—	October 4, 2007	Kitt Peak	Spacewatch	T_{j} (2.99) · 3:2	3.6 km	MPC · JPL
456785	2007 TE_{175}	—	October 4, 2007	Kitt Peak	Spacewatch	NYS	840 m	MPC · JPL
456786	2007 TX_{177}	—	September 12, 2007	Mount Lemmon	Mount Lemmon Survey	·	1.1 km	MPC · JPL
456787	2007 TB_{187}	—	October 7, 2007	Catalina	CSS	MAS	680 m	MPC · JPL
456788	2007 TA_{195}	—	September 21, 2003	Kitt Peak	Spacewatch	·	970 m	MPC · JPL
456789	2007 TD_{200}	—	October 8, 2007	Kitt Peak	Spacewatch	MAS	680 m	MPC · JPL
456790	2007 TK_{200}	—	October 8, 2007	Mount Lemmon	Mount Lemmon Survey	·	930 m	MPC · JPL
456791	2007 TK_{204}	—	October 8, 2007	Mount Lemmon	Mount Lemmon Survey	·	960 m	MPC · JPL
456792	2007 TE_{205}	—	October 8, 2007	Mount Lemmon	Mount Lemmon Survey	·	1.1 km	MPC · JPL
456793	2007 TH_{205}	—	October 8, 2007	Mount Lemmon	Mount Lemmon Survey	·	980 m	MPC · JPL
456794	2007 TC_{210}	—	September 11, 2007	Mount Lemmon	Mount Lemmon Survey	·	920 m	MPC · JPL
456795	2007 TK_{230}	—	October 8, 2007	Kitt Peak	Spacewatch	MAS	640 m	MPC · JPL
456796	2007 TE_{236}	—	October 9, 2007	Mount Lemmon	Mount Lemmon Survey	·	1.0 km	MPC · JPL
456797	2007 TB_{239}	—	October 10, 2007	Mount Lemmon	Mount Lemmon Survey	·	1.0 km	MPC · JPL
456798	2007 TL_{244}	—	October 8, 2007	Catalina	CSS	·	1.2 km	MPC · JPL
456799	2007 TC_{246}	—	October 9, 2007	Catalina	CSS	·	1.1 km	MPC · JPL
456800	2007 TY_{247}	—	October 10, 2007	Kitt Peak	Spacewatch	·	700 m	MPC · JPL

== 456801–456900 ==
back to top

Designation			Discovery			Properties		Ref
Permanent	Provisional	Named after	Date	Site	Discoverer(s)	Category	Diam.	Ref
456801	2007 TA_{259}	—	October 10, 2007	Mount Lemmon	Mount Lemmon Survey	·	990 m	MPC · JPL
456802	2007 TH_{265}	—	February 1, 2005	Catalina	CSS	·	1.2 km	MPC · JPL
456803	2007 TN_{270}	—	October 5, 2007	Kitt Peak	Spacewatch	NYS	910 m	MPC · JPL
456804	2007 TL_{291}	—	September 11, 2007	Kitt Peak	Spacewatch	·	1.1 km	MPC · JPL
456805	2007 TZ_{291}	—	October 13, 2007	Catalina	CSS	T_{j} (2.98) · 3:2 · SHU	3.7 km	MPC · JPL
456806	2007 TZ_{299}	—	October 12, 2007	Kitt Peak	Spacewatch	NYS	960 m	MPC · JPL
456807	2007 TW_{304}	—	September 15, 2007	Kitt Peak	Spacewatch	·	1.1 km	MPC · JPL
456808	2007 TS_{312}	—	October 11, 2007	Mount Lemmon	Mount Lemmon Survey	NYS	960 m	MPC · JPL
456809	2007 TQ_{351}	—	September 3, 2007	Catalina	CSS	·	3.7 km	MPC · JPL
456810	2007 TV_{356}	—	October 12, 2007	Kitt Peak	Spacewatch	·	2.6 km	MPC · JPL
456811	2007 TD_{357}	—	September 8, 2007	Mount Lemmon	Mount Lemmon Survey	NYS	940 m	MPC · JPL
456812	2007 TS_{358}	—	April 10, 2002	Socorro	LINEAR	PHO	970 m	MPC · JPL
456813	2007 TV_{363}	—	October 14, 2007	Mount Lemmon	Mount Lemmon Survey	NYS	830 m	MPC · JPL
456814	2007 TP_{366}	—	September 26, 2007	Mount Lemmon	Mount Lemmon Survey	·	1.2 km	MPC · JPL
456815	2007 TK_{372}	—	September 13, 2007	Mount Lemmon	Mount Lemmon Survey	CYB	2.9 km	MPC · JPL
456816	2007 TP_{375}	—	September 12, 2007	Catalina	CSS	NYS	1.2 km	MPC · JPL
456817	2007 TJ_{377}	—	October 11, 2007	Mount Lemmon	Mount Lemmon Survey	·	3.6 km	MPC · JPL
456818	2007 TN_{389}	—	October 13, 2007	Catalina	CSS	NYS	1.1 km	MPC · JPL
456819	2007 TZ_{392}	—	October 15, 2007	Lulin	LUSS	NYS	920 m	MPC · JPL
456820	2007 TA_{393}	—	October 15, 2007	Lulin	LUSS	·	920 m	MPC · JPL
456821	2007 TO_{410}	—	October 8, 2007	Anderson Mesa	LONEOS	·	1.3 km	MPC · JPL
456822	2007 TN_{412}	—	September 13, 2007	Catalina	CSS	·	1.1 km	MPC · JPL
456823	2007 TN_{413}	—	September 25, 2007	Mount Lemmon	Mount Lemmon Survey	NYS	970 m	MPC · JPL
456824	2007 TY_{418}	—	October 10, 2007	Kitt Peak	Spacewatch	·	960 m	MPC · JPL
456825	2007 TW_{420}	—	September 14, 2007	Catalina	CSS	PHO	1.1 km	MPC · JPL
456826	2007 TH_{422}	—	October 3, 2007	Apache Point	A. C. Becker, Puckett, A. W., Kubica, J.	plutino	148 km	MPC · JPL
456827	2007 TA_{425}	—	October 8, 2007	Kitt Peak	Spacewatch	·	670 m	MPC · JPL
456828	2007 TS_{425}	—	October 8, 2007	Mount Lemmon	Mount Lemmon Survey	·	1.0 km	MPC · JPL
456829	2007 TE_{427}	—	October 10, 2007	Kitt Peak	Spacewatch	·	980 m	MPC · JPL
456830	2007 TF_{428}	—	October 10, 2007	Mount Lemmon	Mount Lemmon Survey	·	1.1 km	MPC · JPL
456831	2007 TN_{433}	—	October 10, 2007	Kitt Peak	Spacewatch	NYS	950 m	MPC · JPL
456832	2007 TA_{434}	—	October 15, 2007	Kitt Peak	Spacewatch	·	870 m	MPC · JPL
456833	2007 TC_{435}	—	October 9, 2007	Mount Lemmon	Mount Lemmon Survey	CLA	1.6 km	MPC · JPL
456834	2007 TK_{435}	—	October 12, 2007	Mount Lemmon	Mount Lemmon Survey	·	1.1 km	MPC · JPL
456835	2007 TP_{444}	—	October 12, 2007	Socorro	LINEAR	·	940 m	MPC · JPL
456836	2007 TX_{445}	—	October 8, 2007	Catalina	CSS	·	1.2 km	MPC · JPL
456837	2007 TK_{446}	—	October 9, 2007	Kitt Peak	Spacewatch	NYS	1.1 km	MPC · JPL
456838	2007 UU_{4}	—	October 10, 2007	Mount Lemmon	Mount Lemmon Survey	NYS	1.0 km	MPC · JPL
456839	2007 UP_{11}	—	October 8, 2007	XuYi	PMO NEO Survey Program	·	1.3 km	MPC · JPL
456840	2007 UC_{22}	—	October 7, 2007	Mount Lemmon	Mount Lemmon Survey	V	590 m	MPC · JPL
456841	2007 UK_{24}	—	October 16, 2007	Kitt Peak	Spacewatch	NYS	970 m	MPC · JPL
456842	2007 UM_{25}	—	October 12, 2007	Kitt Peak	Spacewatch	MAS	630 m	MPC · JPL
456843	2007 UG_{43}	—	October 6, 2007	Kitt Peak	Spacewatch	NYS	1.0 km	MPC · JPL
456844	2007 UQ_{49}	—	October 24, 2007	Mount Lemmon	Mount Lemmon Survey	·	830 m	MPC · JPL
456845	2007 UL_{53}	—	October 30, 2007	Kitt Peak	Spacewatch	·	940 m	MPC · JPL
456846	2007 UM_{53}	—	October 11, 2007	Kitt Peak	Spacewatch	(2076)	810 m	MPC · JPL
456847	2007 UQ_{81}	—	October 30, 2007	Kitt Peak	Spacewatch	·	720 m	MPC · JPL
456848	2007 UQ_{82}	—	October 30, 2007	Kitt Peak	Spacewatch	·	980 m	MPC · JPL
456849	2007 UD_{83}	—	October 8, 2007	Mount Lemmon	Mount Lemmon Survey	·	830 m	MPC · JPL
456850	2007 UN_{84}	—	October 30, 2007	Kitt Peak	Spacewatch	V	560 m	MPC · JPL
456851	2007 UZ_{99}	—	October 16, 2007	Mount Lemmon	Mount Lemmon Survey	·	1.0 km	MPC · JPL
456852	2007 UB_{106}	—	October 31, 2007	Kitt Peak	Spacewatch	MAS	590 m	MPC · JPL
456853	2007 UE_{107}	—	October 31, 2007	Mount Lemmon	Mount Lemmon Survey	·	1.0 km	MPC · JPL
456854	2007 UT_{107}	—	September 12, 2007	Mount Lemmon	Mount Lemmon Survey	V	620 m	MPC · JPL
456855	2007 UO_{123}	—	October 31, 2007	Mount Lemmon	Mount Lemmon Survey	·	1.1 km	MPC · JPL
456856	2007 UY_{126}	—	October 20, 2007	Mount Lemmon	Mount Lemmon Survey	·	950 m	MPC · JPL
456857	2007 UX_{127}	—	October 24, 2007	Mount Lemmon	Mount Lemmon Survey	·	1.1 km	MPC · JPL
456858	2007 UK_{137}	—	October 16, 2007	Catalina	CSS	V	590 m	MPC · JPL
456859	2007 UN_{140}	—	October 17, 2007	Mount Lemmon	Mount Lemmon Survey	BRG	1.2 km	MPC · JPL
456860	2007 UG_{141}	—	October 25, 2007	Mount Lemmon	Mount Lemmon Survey	·	1.2 km	MPC · JPL
456861	2007 VB_{4}	—	October 21, 2007	Kitt Peak	Spacewatch	·	1.1 km	MPC · JPL
456862	2007 VR_{4}	—	September 20, 2007	Catalina	CSS	·	1.2 km	MPC · JPL
456863	2007 VX_{7}	—	November 4, 2007	Catalina	CSS	AMO	400 m	MPC · JPL
456864	2007 VE_{9}	—	November 2, 2007	Mount Lemmon	Mount Lemmon Survey	·	2.1 km	MPC · JPL
456865	2007 VF_{11}	—	October 10, 2007	Anderson Mesa	LONEOS	PHO	1.1 km	MPC · JPL
456866	2007 VH_{13}	—	September 8, 2007	Mount Lemmon	Mount Lemmon Survey	MAS	620 m	MPC · JPL
456867	2007 VP_{15}	—	October 8, 2007	Mount Lemmon	Mount Lemmon Survey	MAS	680 m	MPC · JPL
456868	2007 VC_{39}	—	October 16, 2007	Mount Lemmon	Mount Lemmon Survey	·	3.6 km	MPC · JPL
456869	2007 VR_{39}	—	September 13, 2007	Mount Lemmon	Mount Lemmon Survey	·	1.0 km	MPC · JPL
456870	2007 VQ_{42}	—	November 3, 2007	Mount Lemmon	Mount Lemmon Survey	·	1.1 km	MPC · JPL
456871	2007 VT_{43}	—	November 1, 2007	Kitt Peak	Spacewatch	PHO	950 m	MPC · JPL
456872	2007 VO_{49}	—	November 1, 2007	Kitt Peak	Spacewatch	V	740 m	MPC · JPL
456873	2007 VJ_{61}	—	November 1, 2007	Kitt Peak	Spacewatch	·	900 m	MPC · JPL
456874	2007 VM_{68}	—	November 3, 2007	Mount Lemmon	Mount Lemmon Survey	NYS	1.0 km	MPC · JPL
456875	2007 VP_{76}	—	September 15, 2007	Mount Lemmon	Mount Lemmon Survey	·	1.1 km	MPC · JPL
456876	2007 VP_{78}	—	November 3, 2007	Kitt Peak	Spacewatch	·	1.2 km	MPC · JPL
456877	2007 VY_{91}	—	November 7, 2007	Eskridge	G. Hug	NYS	770 m	MPC · JPL
456878	2007 VL_{92}	—	November 8, 2007	Catalina	CSS	·	1.1 km	MPC · JPL
456879	2007 VX_{93}	—	October 16, 2007	Mount Lemmon	Mount Lemmon Survey	·	940 m	MPC · JPL
456880	2007 VM_{102}	—	November 2, 2007	Kitt Peak	Spacewatch	H	530 m	MPC · JPL
456881	2007 VP_{103}	—	November 3, 2007	Kitt Peak	Spacewatch	·	1.0 km	MPC · JPL
456882	2007 VU_{104}	—	November 3, 2007	Kitt Peak	Spacewatch	·	1.3 km	MPC · JPL
456883	2007 VO_{105}	—	November 3, 2007	Kitt Peak	Spacewatch	MAS	550 m	MPC · JPL
456884	2007 VP_{108}	—	November 3, 2007	Kitt Peak	Spacewatch	MAS	600 m	MPC · JPL
456885	2007 VZ_{108}	—	November 3, 2007	Kitt Peak	Spacewatch	NYS	850 m	MPC · JPL
456886	2007 VY_{120}	—	November 5, 2007	Kitt Peak	Spacewatch	·	800 m	MPC · JPL
456887	2007 VU_{122}	—	February 2, 2005	Kitt Peak	Spacewatch	NYS	1.1 km	MPC · JPL
456888	2007 VF_{123}	—	September 13, 2007	Mount Lemmon	Mount Lemmon Survey	MAS	580 m	MPC · JPL
456889	2007 VP_{123}	—	October 19, 2007	Catalina	CSS	PHO	830 m	MPC · JPL
456890	2007 VC_{131}	—	November 1, 2007	Kitt Peak	Spacewatch	MAS	540 m	MPC · JPL
456891	2007 VN_{144}	—	November 4, 2007	Kitt Peak	Spacewatch	·	890 m	MPC · JPL
456892	2007 VZ_{147}	—	November 4, 2007	Kitt Peak	Spacewatch	·	2.9 km	MPC · JPL
456893	2007 VX_{157}	—	October 20, 2007	Mount Lemmon	Mount Lemmon Survey	·	940 m	MPC · JPL
456894	2007 VJ_{158}	—	November 5, 2007	Kitt Peak	Spacewatch	·	880 m	MPC · JPL
456895	2007 VM_{176}	—	October 8, 2007	Mount Lemmon	Mount Lemmon Survey	·	890 m	MPC · JPL
456896	2007 VX_{178}	—	November 7, 2007	Mount Lemmon	Mount Lemmon Survey	·	980 m	MPC · JPL
456897	2007 VZ_{180}	—	September 9, 2007	Mount Lemmon	Mount Lemmon Survey	MAS	560 m	MPC · JPL
456898	2007 VG_{184}	—	November 11, 2007	Siding Spring	SSS	APO +1km	1.2 km	MPC · JPL
456899	2007 VV_{185}	—	November 5, 2007	XuYi	PMO NEO Survey Program	·	1.3 km	MPC · JPL
456900	2007 VW_{188}	—	October 23, 2001	Kitt Peak	Spacewatch	·	4.1 km	MPC · JPL

== 456901–457000 ==
back to top

Designation			Discovery			Properties		Ref
Permanent	Provisional	Named after	Date	Site	Discoverer(s)	Category	Diam.	Ref
456901	2007 VL_{201}	—	November 9, 2007	Mount Lemmon	Mount Lemmon Survey	·	1.0 km	MPC · JPL
456902	2007 VT_{206}	—	October 21, 2007	Kitt Peak	Spacewatch	·	980 m	MPC · JPL
456903	2007 VT_{216}	—	November 9, 2007	Kitt Peak	Spacewatch	·	950 m	MPC · JPL
456904	2007 VC_{222}	—	November 7, 2007	Mount Lemmon	Mount Lemmon Survey	·	1.1 km	MPC · JPL
456905	2007 VG_{225}	—	October 10, 2007	Kitt Peak	Spacewatch	MAS	620 m	MPC · JPL
456906	2007 VU_{239}	—	October 30, 2007	Kitt Peak	Spacewatch	·	1.0 km	MPC · JPL
456907	2007 VZ_{277}	—	November 14, 2007	Kitt Peak	Spacewatch	·	900 m	MPC · JPL
456908	2007 VG_{286}	—	November 14, 2007	Kitt Peak	Spacewatch	·	1.2 km	MPC · JPL
456909	2007 VQ_{319}	—	November 8, 2007	Kitt Peak	Spacewatch	·	900 m	MPC · JPL
456910	2007 VR_{325}	—	November 2, 2007	Kitt Peak	Spacewatch	(5)	1 km	MPC · JPL
456911	2007 VQ_{331}	—	November 13, 2007	Kitt Peak	Spacewatch	·	910 m	MPC · JPL
456912	2007 VO_{335}	—	November 14, 2007	Mount Lemmon	Mount Lemmon Survey	·	1.3 km	MPC · JPL
456913	2007 WC_{21}	—	November 18, 2007	Mount Lemmon	Mount Lemmon Survey	·	1.5 km	MPC · JPL
456914	2007 WM_{39}	—	November 12, 2007	Mount Lemmon	Mount Lemmon Survey	·	1.3 km	MPC · JPL
456915	2007 WQ_{58}	—	November 17, 2007	Kitt Peak	Spacewatch	MAS	520 m	MPC · JPL
456916	2007 WQ_{61}	—	November 19, 2007	Kitt Peak	Spacewatch	H	630 m	MPC · JPL
456917	2007 XP_{28}	—	November 13, 2007	Kitt Peak	Spacewatch	·	1.1 km	MPC · JPL
456918	2007 XL_{29}	—	December 15, 2007	Mount Lemmon	Mount Lemmon Survey	·	1.1 km	MPC · JPL
456919	2007 XS_{29}	—	September 14, 2007	Mount Lemmon	Mount Lemmon Survey	NYS	990 m	MPC · JPL
456920	2007 XG_{43}	—	December 15, 2007	Kitt Peak	Spacewatch	·	1.2 km	MPC · JPL
456921	2007 XM_{45}	—	December 1, 2003	Kitt Peak	Spacewatch	·	910 m	MPC · JPL
456922	2007 XS_{45}	—	December 4, 2007	Kitt Peak	Spacewatch	·	1.4 km	MPC · JPL
456923	2007 XD_{49}	—	November 6, 2007	Mount Lemmon	Mount Lemmon Survey	·	1.5 km	MPC · JPL
456924	2007 XH_{50}	—	December 4, 2007	Catalina	CSS	·	3.5 km	MPC · JPL
456925	2007 XQ_{51}	—	December 4, 2007	Mount Lemmon	Mount Lemmon Survey	·	1.5 km	MPC · JPL
456926	2007 XN_{52}	—	December 6, 2007	Kitt Peak	Spacewatch	·	1.2 km	MPC · JPL
456927	2007 XT_{52}	—	December 4, 2007	Kitt Peak	Spacewatch	(5)	990 m	MPC · JPL
456928	2007 XS_{53}	—	December 15, 2007	Kitt Peak	Spacewatch	·	1.4 km	MPC · JPL
456929	2007 XV_{57}	—	December 5, 2007	Kitt Peak	Spacewatch	·	1.4 km	MPC · JPL
456930	2007 YQ_{2}	—	December 18, 2007	Rehoboth	L. A. Molnar	H	590 m	MPC · JPL
456931	2007 YP_{16}	—	December 16, 2007	Kitt Peak	Spacewatch	MAS	490 m	MPC · JPL
456932	2007 YU_{28}	—	November 18, 2007	Kitt Peak	Spacewatch	·	980 m	MPC · JPL
456933	2007 YJ_{42}	—	December 30, 2007	Catalina	CSS	H	530 m	MPC · JPL
456934	2007 YG_{43}	—	December 30, 2007	Kitt Peak	Spacewatch	·	830 m	MPC · JPL
456935	2007 YN_{43}	—	December 30, 2007	Kitt Peak	Spacewatch	·	890 m	MPC · JPL
456936	2007 YC_{53}	—	December 30, 2007	Kitt Peak	Spacewatch	·	1.2 km	MPC · JPL
456937	2007 YX_{53}	—	October 12, 2007	Anderson Mesa	LONEOS	·	1.6 km	MPC · JPL
456938	2007 YV_{56}	—	December 31, 2007	Catalina	CSS	APO · PHA	230 m	MPC · JPL
456939	2007 YY_{67}	—	April 4, 2005	Mount Lemmon	Mount Lemmon Survey	(5)	1.6 km	MPC · JPL
456940	2007 YH_{72}	—	December 18, 2007	Mount Lemmon	Mount Lemmon Survey	·	1.1 km	MPC · JPL
456941	2008 AG	—	December 31, 2007	Mount Lemmon	Mount Lemmon Survey	·	1.9 km	MPC · JPL
456942	2008 AG_{5}	—	September 18, 2007	Mount Lemmon	Mount Lemmon Survey	·	1.2 km	MPC · JPL
456943	2008 AB_{17}	—	January 10, 2008	Kitt Peak	Spacewatch	·	1.3 km	MPC · JPL
456944	2008 AO_{24}	—	January 10, 2008	Mount Lemmon	Mount Lemmon Survey	·	950 m	MPC · JPL
456945	2008 AW_{29}	—	December 4, 2007	Kitt Peak	Spacewatch	PHO	870 m	MPC · JPL
456946	2008 AF_{32}	—	January 13, 2008	Catalina	CSS	AMO	190 m	MPC · JPL
456947	2008 AX_{41}	—	January 10, 2008	Mount Lemmon	Mount Lemmon Survey	·	1.0 km	MPC · JPL
456948	2008 AU_{51}	—	January 11, 2008	Kitt Peak	Spacewatch	(5)	850 m	MPC · JPL
456949	2008 AJ_{55}	—	January 11, 2008	Kitt Peak	Spacewatch	·	910 m	MPC · JPL
456950	2008 AD_{56}	—	December 30, 2007	Kitt Peak	Spacewatch	·	890 m	MPC · JPL
456951	2008 AZ_{56}	—	January 11, 2008	Kitt Peak	Spacewatch	·	1.8 km	MPC · JPL
456952	2008 AP_{57}	—	January 11, 2008	Kitt Peak	Spacewatch	·	1 km	MPC · JPL
456953	2008 AV_{57}	—	January 11, 2008	Kitt Peak	Spacewatch	·	1.4 km	MPC · JPL
456954	2008 AT_{59}	—	January 11, 2008	Kitt Peak	Spacewatch	·	960 m	MPC · JPL
456955	2008 AB_{62}	—	January 11, 2008	Kitt Peak	Spacewatch	·	960 m	MPC · JPL
456956	2008 AR_{62}	—	December 30, 2007	Kitt Peak	Spacewatch	·	1.3 km	MPC · JPL
456957	2008 AR_{65}	—	January 11, 2008	Kitt Peak	Spacewatch	·	1.1 km	MPC · JPL
456958	2008 AO_{68}	—	January 11, 2008	Mount Lemmon	Mount Lemmon Survey	·	850 m	MPC · JPL
456959	2008 AS_{68}	—	December 30, 2007	Mount Lemmon	Mount Lemmon Survey	·	720 m	MPC · JPL
456960	2008 AU_{70}	—	January 12, 2008	Mount Lemmon	Mount Lemmon Survey	·	1.3 km	MPC · JPL
456961	2008 AD_{79}	—	January 12, 2008	Kitt Peak	Spacewatch	H	490 m	MPC · JPL
456962	2008 AN_{83}	—	January 15, 2008	Mount Lemmon	Mount Lemmon Survey	·	1.1 km	MPC · JPL
456963	2008 AN_{87}	—	January 12, 2008	Andrushivka	Andrushivka	H	540 m	MPC · JPL
456964	2008 AF_{89}	—	December 30, 2007	Kitt Peak	Spacewatch	·	930 m	MPC · JPL
456965	2008 AF_{92}	—	January 1, 2008	Kitt Peak	Spacewatch	·	1.6 km	MPC · JPL
456966	2008 AQ_{95}	—	December 30, 2007	Kitt Peak	Spacewatch	·	1.3 km	MPC · JPL
456967	2008 AD_{97}	—	January 14, 2008	Kitt Peak	Spacewatch	3:2	6.0 km	MPC · JPL
456968	2008 AG_{100}	—	January 14, 2008	Kitt Peak	Spacewatch	·	1.4 km	MPC · JPL
456969	2008 AV_{101}	—	December 20, 2007	Kitt Peak	Spacewatch	·	1.1 km	MPC · JPL
456970	2008 AX_{108}	—	December 31, 2007	Kitt Peak	Spacewatch	·	1.0 km	MPC · JPL
456971	2008 AC_{113}	—	December 17, 2007	Catalina	CSS	H	600 m	MPC · JPL
456972	2008 AE_{118}	—	January 13, 2008	Kitt Peak	Spacewatch	·	1.3 km	MPC · JPL
456973	2008 BS_{2}	—	January 18, 2008	Kitt Peak	Spacewatch	APO +1km	840 m	MPC · JPL
456974	2008 BY_{6}	—	December 31, 2007	Mount Lemmon	Mount Lemmon Survey	·	840 m	MPC · JPL
456975	2008 BB_{12}	—	December 20, 2007	Kitt Peak	Spacewatch	·	1.3 km	MPC · JPL
456976	2008 BS_{19}	—	January 30, 2008	Kitt Peak	Spacewatch	MAS	720 m	MPC · JPL
456977	2008 BN_{21}	—	January 30, 2008	Mount Lemmon	Mount Lemmon Survey	·	970 m	MPC · JPL
456978	2008 BS_{30}	—	January 15, 2008	Mount Lemmon	Mount Lemmon Survey	·	1.1 km	MPC · JPL
456979	2008 BE_{32}	—	January 30, 2008	Mount Lemmon	Mount Lemmon Survey	·	1.1 km	MPC · JPL
456980	2008 BU_{33}	—	November 19, 2007	Mount Lemmon	Mount Lemmon Survey	·	950 m	MPC · JPL
456981	2008 BM_{34}	—	January 30, 2008	Kitt Peak	Spacewatch	·	820 m	MPC · JPL
456982	2008 BS_{35}	—	January 30, 2008	Kitt Peak	Spacewatch	·	1.0 km	MPC · JPL
456983	2008 BD_{38}	—	September 19, 2006	Catalina	CSS	·	1.7 km	MPC · JPL
456984	2008 BN_{49}	—	January 30, 2008	Mount Lemmon	Mount Lemmon Survey	H	620 m	MPC · JPL
456985	2008 CW_{5}	—	December 14, 2007	Catalina	CSS	·	1.3 km	MPC · JPL
456986	2008 CE_{7}	—	February 1, 2008	Kitt Peak	Spacewatch	·	1.5 km	MPC · JPL
456987	2008 CU_{9}	—	February 2, 2008	Mount Lemmon	Mount Lemmon Survey	·	960 m	MPC · JPL
456988	2008 CQ_{14}	—	February 3, 2008	Kitt Peak	Spacewatch	·	1.2 km	MPC · JPL
456989	2008 CK_{17}	—	February 3, 2008	Kitt Peak	Spacewatch	·	1.2 km	MPC · JPL
456990	2008 CY_{27}	—	January 10, 2008	Mount Lemmon	Mount Lemmon Survey	·	1.1 km	MPC · JPL
456991	2008 CS_{30}	—	February 2, 2008	Kitt Peak	Spacewatch	·	1.8 km	MPC · JPL
456992	2008 CM_{35}	—	February 2, 2008	Kitt Peak	Spacewatch	·	900 m	MPC · JPL
456993	2008 CU_{35}	—	January 1, 2008	Mount Lemmon	Mount Lemmon Survey	·	1.5 km	MPC · JPL
456994	2008 CF_{42}	—	February 2, 2008	Kitt Peak	Spacewatch	·	1.1 km	MPC · JPL
456995	2008 CF_{45}	—	January 11, 2008	Mount Lemmon	Mount Lemmon Survey	·	980 m	MPC · JPL
456996	2008 CO_{45}	—	February 2, 2008	Kitt Peak	Spacewatch	·	1.1 km	MPC · JPL
456997	2008 CC_{50}	—	December 18, 2007	Mount Lemmon	Mount Lemmon Survey	H	520 m	MPC · JPL
456998	2008 CH_{50}	—	February 6, 2008	Catalina	CSS	H	610 m	MPC · JPL
456999	2008 CJ_{50}	—	February 6, 2008	Catalina	CSS	·	980 m	MPC · JPL
457000	2008 CL_{51}	—	February 7, 2008	Kitt Peak	Spacewatch	·	850 m	MPC · JPL

back to top

== Meaning of names ==
As minor planet discoveries are confirmed, they are given a permanent number by the IAU's Minor Planet Center (MPC), and the discoverers can then submit names for them, following the IAU's naming conventions. The list below concerns those minor planets in the specified number-range that have received names, and explains the meanings of those names.

Official naming citations of newly named small Solar System bodies are approved and published in a bulletin by IAU's Working Group for Small Bodies Nomenclature (WGSBN). Before May 2021, citations were published in MPC's Minor Planet Circulars for many decades. Recent citations can also be found on the JPL Small-Body Database (SBDB). Until his death in 2016, German astronomer Lutz D. Schmadel compiled these citations into the Dictionary of Minor Planet Names (DMP) and regularly updated the collection.

Based on Paul Herget's The Names of the Minor Planets, Schmadel also researched the unclear origin of numerous asteroids, most of which had been named prior to World War II. This article incorporates text from this source, which is in the public domain: SBDB New namings may only be added to this list below after official publication as the preannouncement of names is condemned. The WGSBN publishes a comprehensive guideline for the naming rules of non-cometary small Solar System bodies.

Named minor planet	Provisional	This minor planet was named for...	Ref · Catalog
456378 Akashikaikyo	2006 UA_{62}	The Akashi Kaikyo Bridge is the longest suspended bridge in the world. Its main span is 1991 meters long. It joins the city of Kobe on Honshu Island to Awaji island, passing over the strait of Akashi.	IAU · 456378
456627 Cristianmartins	2007 KE_{7}	Cristian Martins (born 2005), from Campos dos Goytacazes, Brazil, is a student at Escola Municipal Dr. Getlio Vargas. He participates in the International Astronomical Search Collaboration, having made many asteroid observations and discoveries.	JPL · 456627
456677 Yepeijian	2007 RM_{119}	Ye Peijian (born 1945), a Chinese aerospace engineer and member of the Chinese Academy of Sciences	JPL · 456677
456695 Xingdingyu	2007 RT_{212}	Xing Dingyu (b. 1945), a Chinese physicist and an academician of the Chinese Academy of Sciences.	IAU · 456695
456731 Uligrözinger	2007 TL_{8}	Ulrich Grözinger (born 1952) worked from 1979 to 2018 as an all-round engineer at MPIA Heidelberg. He contributed to many infrared space missions (including ISO, Herschel, and JWST) with his vast knowledge in electronics and cryoengineering. He developed and built the control system of the telescope used for the discovery.	JPL · 456731
