= Ye Peijian =

Chinese aerospace engineer

- Chinese: 葉培建 (traditional); Chinese: 叶培建 (simplified)
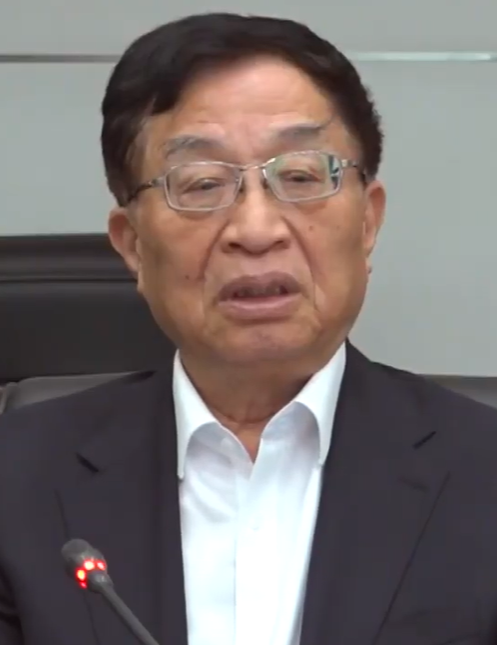
- Peijian, during an interview with China News Service, in 2019
- Born: January 29, 1945 (age 81); Huzhuang Village, Taixing, Jiangsu, China
- Education: University of Neuchâtel
- Known for: Asteroid 456677 Yepeijian named in his honor
- Engineering career
- Discipline: Aerospace engineering
- Institutions: Beijing University of Aeronautics and Astronautics; Harbin Institute of Technology
- Employer: Chinese Academy of Space Technology
- Projects: Chinese Lunar Exploration Program

Ye Peijian (simplified Chinese: 叶培建; traditional Chinese: 葉培建; born January 29, 1945) is a Chinese aerospace engineer. He is the Chief Commander and Chief Designer of the Chinese Lunar Exploration Program.

== Early life and education ==
Ye was born in Huzhuang Village, Taixing, Jiangsu, China, in January 1945. In 1962, he graduated from Huzhou Middle School in Huzhou, Zhejiang province.

Ye completed his undergraduate education in radio science and graduated from Zhejiang University in 1967. Taking the advice of Chinese aerospace engineer Yang Jiachi to avoid the United States because of American restrictions on sensitive technology, he studied at University of Neuchâtel in Switzerland and received a Doctor of Science in 1985.

== Career ==
Ye is a professor both at the Beijing University of Aeronautics and Astronautics and the Harbin Institute of Technology. He is a research fellow and Chief Engineer at the Chinese Academy of Space Technology.

Ye joined the Chinese Communist Party in 1986. He became an academician of the Chinese Academy of Sciences in 2003.

Ye speaks English and French fluently. The inner main-belt asteroid 456677 Yepeijian, discovered by the PMO NEO Survey Program at XuYi Station in 2007, was named in his honor. Naming citation was published on 12 January 2017 (MPC 103028).
