= List of Tiangong space station spacewalks =

The Tiangong space station is a Chinese space station in low Earth orbit, and is operated by the China Manned Space Agency. Extravehicular activities are crucial for both the construction and maintenance of the station. Zhai Zhigang completed the first Chinese spacewalk in 2008, during the Shenzhou 7 mission. Since then, every other Chinese spacewalk has been carried out at the Tiangong space station.

== List ==
*denotes spacewalks performed from the Tianhe core module

^denotes spacewalks performed from the Wentian module

#	Mission	Spacewalkers	Start (UTC)	End (UTC)	Duration
1.	Shenzhou 12; EVA 1 *	Liu Boming; Tang Hongbo	4 July 2021; 00:11	4 July 2021; 06:57	6 hours, 46 minutes
1.	Shenzhou 12; EVA 1 *	Tested an updated version of the Feitian space suit, completed installation of the station's robotic arm, and installed exterior equipment for use on future missions, including a camera lifting bracket.			
2.	Shenzhou 12; EVA 2 *	Nie Haisheng; Liu Boming	20 August 2021; 00:38	20 August 2021; 06:33	5 hours, 55 minutes
2.	Shenzhou 12; EVA 2 *	Tested spacecraft equipment, installed a backup thermal control pump, and installed and raised panoramic camera D.			
3.	Shenzhou 13; EVA 1 *	Zhai Zhigang; Wang Yaping	7 November 2021; 11:28	7 November 2021; 17:16	5 hours, 48 minutes
3.	Shenzhou 13; EVA 1 *	Installed a dual-arm connector to the station's robotic arm along with testing EVA equipment. Wang Yaping became the first Chinese woman to perform an EVA.			
4.	Shenzhou 13; EVA 2 *	Ye Guangfu; Zhai Zhigang	26 December 2021; 10:44	26 December 2021; 16:55	6 hours, 11 minutes
4.	Shenzhou 13; EVA 2 *	Installed panoramic camera C, installed a foot restraint, and tested methods of moving objects outside of the station.			
5.	Shenzhou 14; EVA 1^	Chen Dong; Liu Yang	1 September 2022; 10:26	1 September 2022; 16:33	6 hours, 7 minutes
5.	Shenzhou 14; EVA 1^	Installed an extended pump set on the exterior of Wentian, raised panoramic camera B, installed an exterior workbench, and tested procedures for an emergency return to the station.			
6.	Shenzhou 14; EVA 2^	Chen Dong; Cai Xuzhe	17 September 2022; 05:35	17 September 2022; 09:47	4 hours, 12 minutes
6.	Shenzhou 14; EVA 2^	Installed EVA foot restraints and exterior workbenches, worked on the extended pump set, and verified EVA rescue capabilities.			
7.	Shenzhou 14; EVA 3^	Chen Dong; Cai Xuzhe	17 November 2022; 03:16	17 November 2022; 08:50	5 hours, 34 minutes
7.	Shenzhou 14; EVA 3^	Installed an inter-chamber connection device between Tianhe and Mengtian, raised panoramic A on Wentian, and installed a small mechanical arm power-assisted handle.			
8.	Shenzhou 15; EVA 1^	Fei Junlong; Zhang Lu	9 February 2023; 09:10	9 February 2023; 16:16	7 hours, 6 minutes
8.	Shenzhou 15; EVA 1^	Tasks included the installation of a fourth external pump (Z01-04) on Mengtian and other tasks related to Mengtian's payload airlock.			
9.	Shenzhou 15; EVA 2^	Fei Junlong; Zhang Lu	2 March 2023	2 March 2023	Unknown
9.	Shenzhou 15; EVA 2^	Tasks included installing external equipment on the space station and no announcement was given prior to the spacewalk. Taikonauts installed electrical equipment, according to some Chinese-language sources.			
10.	Shenzhou 15; EVA 3^	Fei Junlong; Zhang Lu	30 March 2023	30 March 2023	Unknown
10.	Shenzhou 15; EVA 3^	Tasks completed were not revealed publicly and no announcement was given prior to the spacewalk. Taikonauts installed and connected cables across the cabin.			
11.	Shenzhou 15; EVA 4^	Fei Junlong; Zhang Lu	15 April 2023	15 April 2023	Unknown
11.	Shenzhou 15; EVA 4^	Tasks included successfully completing the installation and connection of the inter-module cable. and no announcement was given prior to the spacewalk. Taikonauts disposed of trash bags, completed the installation of the fifth extended pump (Z02-01) set on Mengtian, installed and connected cross-cabin cables, and installed the external load exposure platform and support brackets for later science and technology experiments.			
12.	Shenzhou 16; EVA 1^	Jing Haipeng; Zhu Yangzhu	20 July 2023; 05:45	20 July 2023; 13:40	7 hours, 55 minutes
12.	Shenzhou 16; EVA 1^	Taikonauts installed & lifted the bracket for Tianhe panoramic camera B and unlocked & lifted panoramic camera A/B on Mengtian. Zhu Yangzhu became first Chinese flight engineer to conduct an extravehicular activity.			
13.	Shenzhou 17; EVA 1^	Tang Hongbo; Tang Shengjie	21 December 2023; 6:10	21 December 2023; 13:35	7 hours, 25 minutes
13.	Shenzhou 17; EVA 1^	Tasks included a repair test of the Tianhe core module's solar panels, which have sustained minor damage caused by impacts of space debris and micrometeoroids.			
14.	Shenzhou 17; EVA 2^	Tang Hongbo; Jiang Xinlin	1 March 2024; 21:40	2 March 2024; 05:32	7 hours, 52 minutes
14.	Shenzhou 17; EVA 2^	Tasks included maintenance of the solar panels of the Tianhe core module, which have sustained minor damage caused by impacts of space debris and micrometeoroids; evaluation and analysis of the performance status of the solar panel power generation and also inspection of the status of the space station modules.			
15.	Shenzhou 18; EVA 1^	Ye Guangfu; Li Guangsu	28 May 2024; 02:35	28 May 2024; 10:58	8 hours, 23 minutes
15.	Shenzhou 18; EVA 1^	Longest Chinese spacewalk to date. Tasks included installing space debris protection shields and conducting inspections of extravehicular equipment and facilities.			
16.	Shenzhou 18; EVA 2^	Ye Guangfu; Li Cong	3 July 2024; 07:21	3 July 2024; 14:51	6 hours, 30 minutes
16.	Shenzhou 18; EVA 2^	Tasks included installing further space debris protection shields on pipelines, cables, and other equipment, and inspecting the exterior of the station.			
17.	Shenzhou 19; EVA 1^	Cai Xuzhe; Song Lingdong	18 December 2024; 04:51	18 December 2024; 13:57	9 hours, 6 minutes
17.	Shenzhou 19; EVA 1^	The two astronauts completed the longest spacewalk in human history with the assistance of the space station's robotic arms and ground-based scientific personnel, completed tasks such as the installation of space debris protection devices, inspection, and maintenance of external equipment and facilities.			
18.	Shenzhou 19; EVA 2^	Cai Xuzhe; Song Lingdong	20 January 2025; 08:55	20 January 2025; 17:12	8 hours, 17 minutes
18.	Shenzhou 19; EVA 2^	Tasks included installation of space debris protection devices and inspections of the exterior of the TSS.			
19.	Shenzhou 19; EVA 3^	Cai Xuzhe; Song Lingdong	21 March 2025; 05:45	21 March 2025; 12:50	7 hours, 5 minutes
19.	Shenzhou 19; EVA 3^	Tasks included installation of space debris protection devices and inspections of the exterior of the TSS.			
20.	Shenzhou 20; EVA 1 *	Chen Dong; Chen Zhongrui	22 May 2025; 00:50	22 May 2025; 08:49	7 hours, 59 minutes
20.	Shenzhou 20; EVA 1 *	Tasks included installation of more space debris protection devices and inspections of the exterior, fixing damages to the TSS. First Chinese EVA from core module since transitioning into application and development phase.			
21.	Shenzhou 20; EVA 2^	Chen Dong; Chen Zhongrui	26 June 2025; 07:00	26 June 2025; 13:29	6 hours, 29 minutes
21.	Shenzhou 20; EVA 2^	Tasks included installation of more space debris protection devices and inspections of the exterior, fixing damages to the TSS. They added foot restraints and EVA interface adapters on portable work platform for future EVAs.			
22.	Shenzhou 20; EVA 3^	Chen Dong; Wang Jie	15 August 2025; 4:17	15 August 2025; 10:47	6 hours, 30 minutes
22.	Shenzhou 20; EVA 3^	Tasks included completing installation of debris protection devices and auxiliary extravehicular facilities, and inspecting and maintaining external equipment.			
23.	Shenzhou 20; EVA 4^	Chen Zhongrui; Wang Jie	25 September 2025; 11:30	25 September 2025; 17:35	~6 hours, 35 minutes
23.	Shenzhou 20; EVA 4^	Tasks included completing installation of debris protection devices for the space station and inspecting external equipment and facilities. It marked the first time that two members of China's third batch of taikonauts jointly carried out an EVA. So far, the Shenzhou-20 crew has completed four EVAs, making them one of the Chinese crews with the most extravehicular missions.			

== Gallery ==
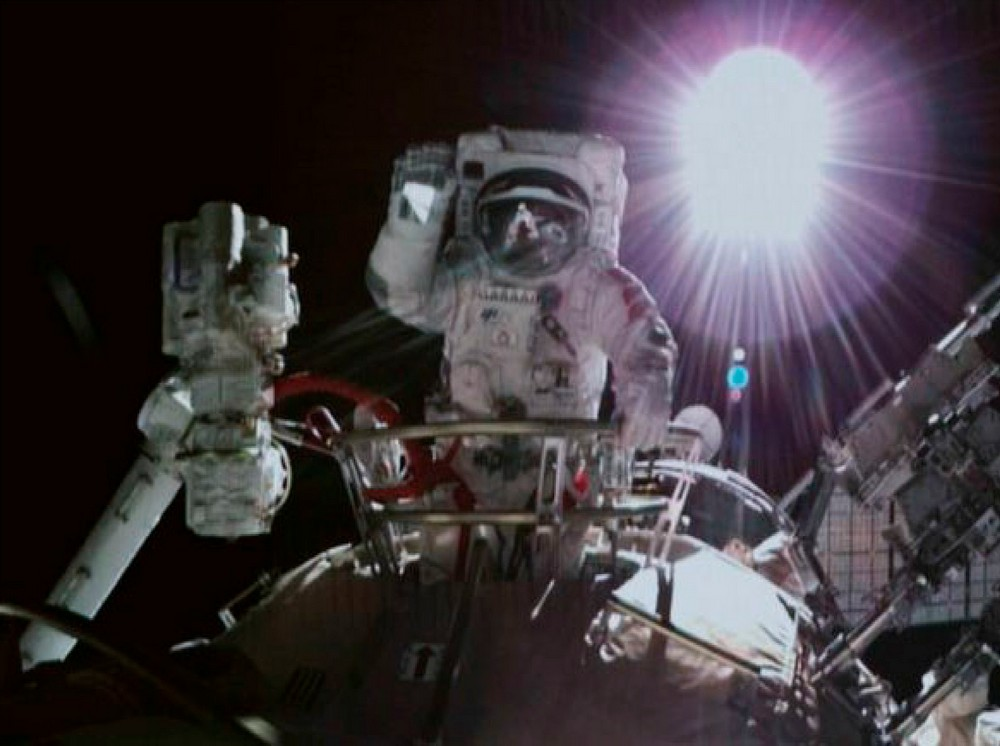
Taikonaut Zhai Zhigang performing a spacewalk on the Tiangong space station during Shenzhou 13

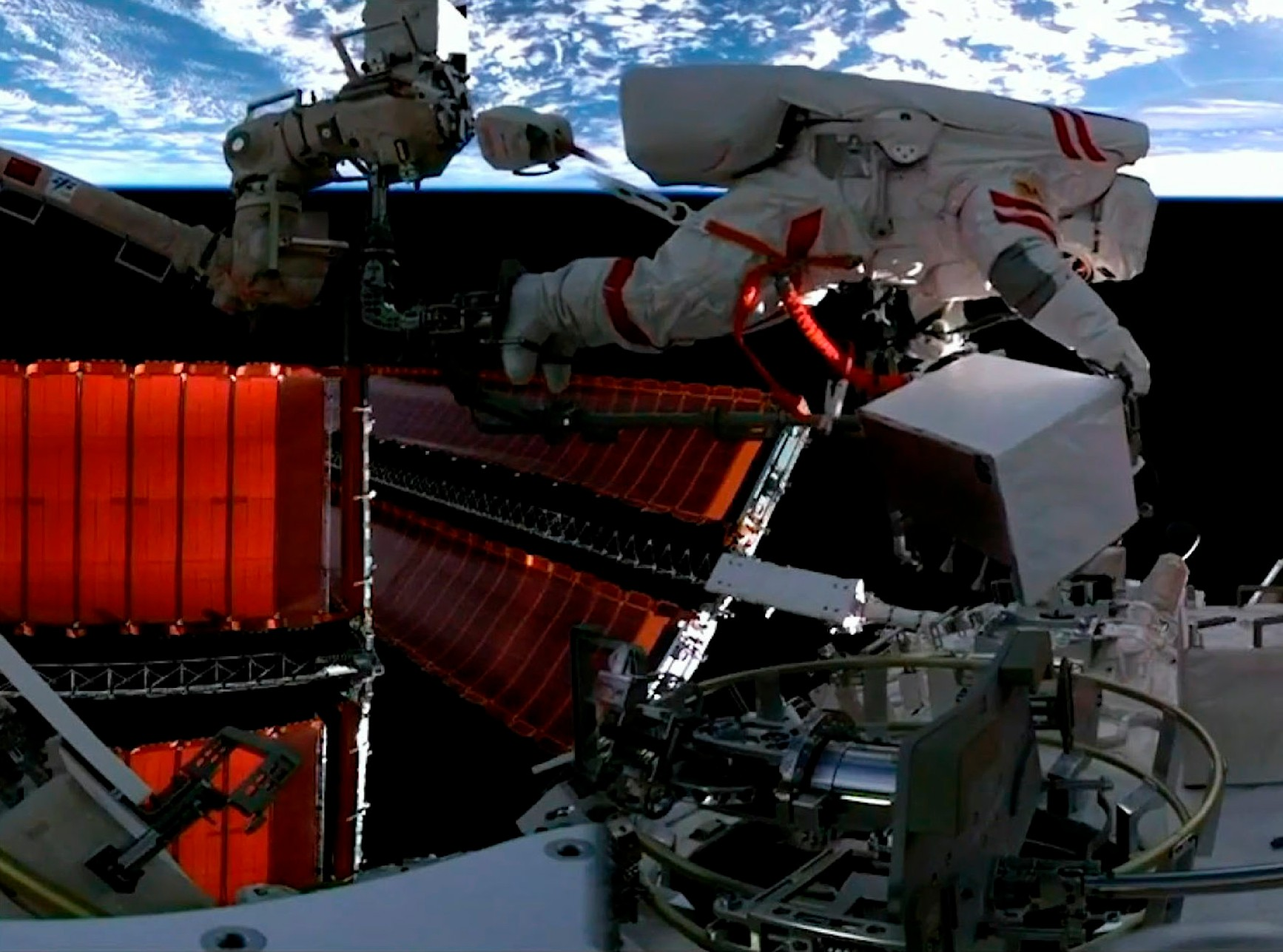
Taikonaut Fei Junlong performing a spacewalk on the Tiangong space station during Shenzhou 15

== See also ==
- List of spacewalks and moonwalks
- List of cumulative spacewalk records
