= Shenzhou 12 =

2021 Chinese crewed spaceflight to the Tiangong Space Station

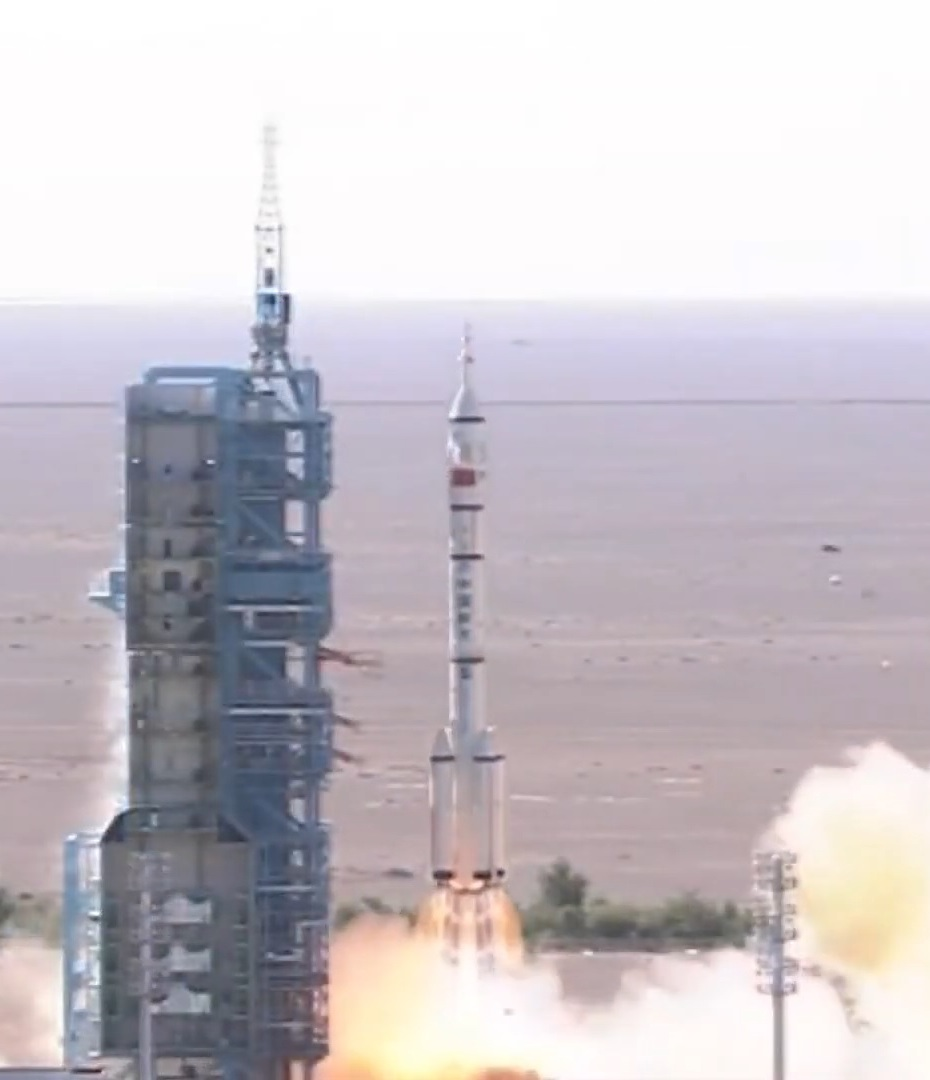
- Launch of Shenzhou 12 on a Long March 2F/G
- Mission type: Tiangong space station crew transport
- Operator: China Manned Space Agency
- COSPAR ID: 2021-053A
- SATCAT no.: 48852
- Mission duration: 92 days, 4 hours, 11 minutes
- Orbits completed: 1,454

Spacecraft properties
- Spacecraft type: Shenzhou
- Manufacturer: China Aerospace Science and Technology Corporation

Crew
- Crew size: 3
- Members: Nie Haisheng; Liu Boming; Tang Hongbo
- EVAs: 2
- EVA duration: 12 hours, 41 minutes

Start of mission
- Launch date: 17 June 2021, 01:22:31 UTC (09:22:31 CST)
- Rocket: Long March 2F/G (Y12)
- Launch site: Jiuquan, LA-4/SLS-1
- Contractor: China Academy of Launch Vehicle Technology

End of mission
- Landing date: 17 September 2021, 05:34:09 UTC
- Landing site: Inner Mongolia (41°37′42.7″N 100°04′28.2″E)

Orbital parameters
- Reference system: Geocentric orbit
- Regime: Low Earth orbit
- Perigee altitude: 330 km (210 mi)
- Apogee altitude: 340 km (210 mi)
- Inclination: 41.4°

Docking with Tiangong space station
- Docking port: Tianhe forward
- Docking date: 17 June 2021, 07:54 UTC
- Undocking date: 16 September 2021, 05:38 UTC
- Time docked: 90 days, 21 hours, 44 minutes
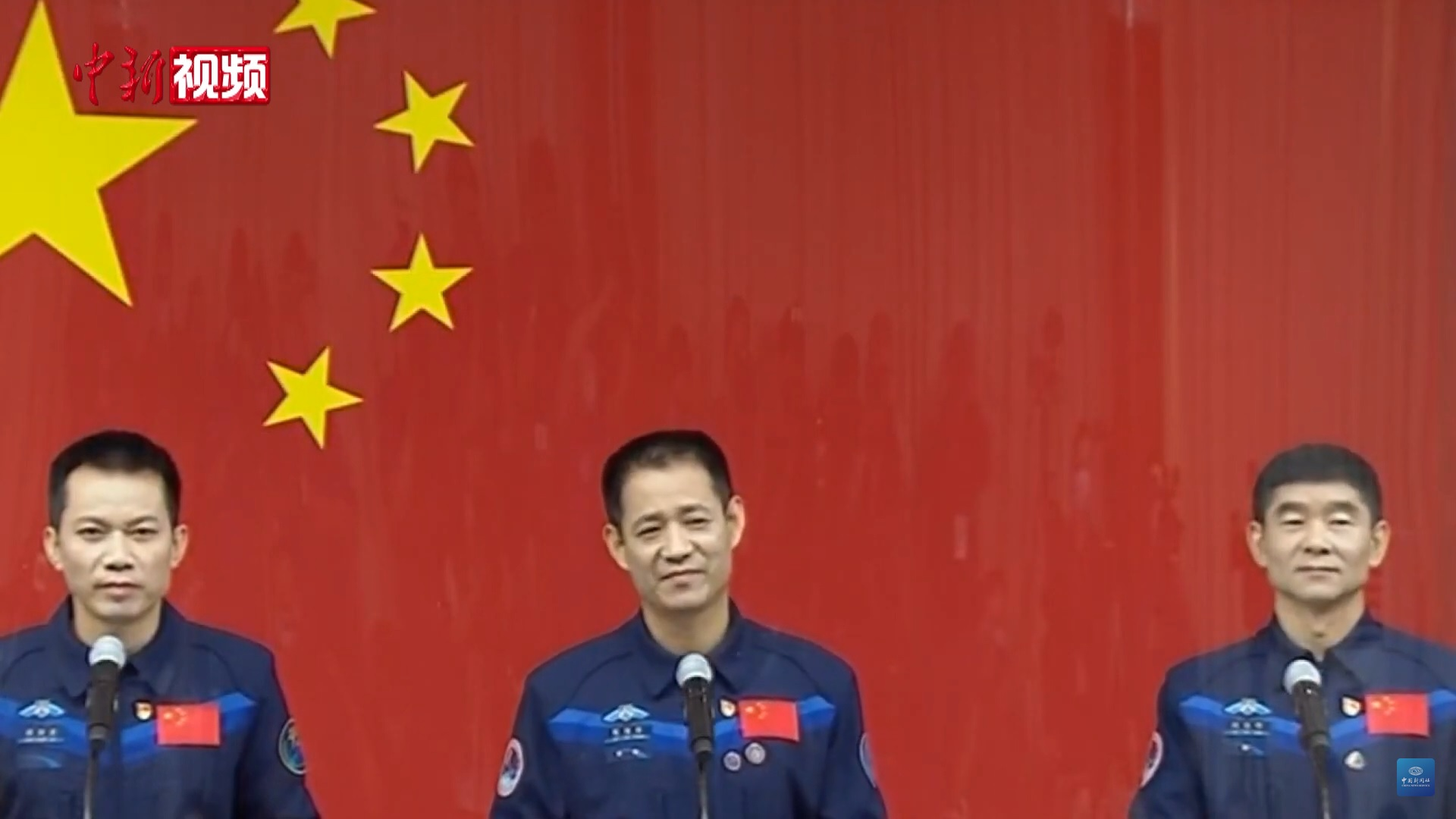
- Mission insignia From left: Tang Hongbo, Nie Haisheng and Liu Boming Shenzhou program

Shenzhou 12 (simplified Chinese: 神舟十二号; traditional Chinese: 神舟十二號; pinyin: Shénzhōu shí'èr hào) was a Chinese spaceflight to the Tiangong space station, launched on 17 June 2021. It carried three People's Liberation Army Astronaut Corps (PLAAC) taikonauts on board a Shenzhou spacecraft. The mission was the seventh crewed Chinese spaceflight and the twelfth flight overall of the Shenzhou program. It was the first flight to Tiangong, and the first Chinese crewed spaceflight since Shenzhou 11 in 2016.

== Background ==
Shenzhou 12 was originally planned as the second mission to visit the single-module Tiangong-2 space laboratory, following Shenzhou 11. In 2016, plans for a second mission to Tiangong-2 were cancelled, and Shenzhou 12 was instead designated as the first crewed mission to the larger modular Tiangong space station, whose first module, the Tianhe core module, was launched on 29 April 2021.

The crew of Shenzhou 12 was announced on 16 June 2021.

== Mission ==
The flight launched from Jiuquan Satellite Launch Center on 17 June 2021 at 01:22 UTC, following the launch of the Tianzhou 2 cargo spacecraft. Just over 6.5 hours after launch, the spacecraft docked with the Tianhe core module's forward docking port. The crew entered the station later that same day at 10:48 UTC, becoming the first crew to visit Tiangong.

During the mission, the Shenzhou 13 spacecraft remained on standby to serve as an emergency rescue vehicle.

The Shenzhou 12 crew activated the station, carried out two spacewalks, and verified key technologies such as robotic arm operation, resource recycling, and long-term life support during the three-month mission.

=== Spacewalks ===
On 4 July 2021, the first of two scheduled spacewalks was carried out by Liu Boming and Tang Hongbo. The taikonauts tested an updated version of the Feitian space suit, completed installation of the station's robotic arm, and installed exterior equipment for use on future missions, including a camera lifting bracket. This marked the second ever Chinese spacewalk, after Zhai Zhigang's spacewalk nearly 13 years prior on Shenzhou 7. The spacewalk lasted for 6 hours and 46 minutes.

On 20 August 2021, Nie Haisheng and Liu Boming carried out the second scheduled spacewalk of the mission. The two tested spacecraft equipment, installed a backup thermal control pump, and installed and raised panoramic camera D on the Tianhe core module. The spacewalk lasted for 5 hours and 55 minutes.

=== Rendezvous test & return to Earth ===
Shenzhou 12 undocked from Tiangong on 16 September 2021 at 00:56 UTC. Following undocking, the spacecraft performed a test of radial rendezvous procedures which would be utilized on the following mission, Shenzhou 13. After a successful test, Shenzhou 12 departed the station and returned to Earth on 17 September 2021, landing at the Dongfeng landing site in the Gobi Desert in Inner Mongolia at 05:34 UTC.

== Crew ==
Prime crew
Position	Crew
Commander	Nie Haisheng, PLAAC; Third spaceflight
Operator	Liu Boming, PLAAC; Second spaceflight
System Operator	Tang Hongbo, PLAAC; First spaceflight

Nie Haisheng previously flew on Shenzhou 6 and Shenzhou 10. Liu Boming previously flew on Shenzhou 7.

Backup crew
Position	Crew
Commander	Zhai Zhigang, PLAAC
Operator	Wang Yaping, PLAAC
System Operator	Ye Guangfu, PLAAC

The backup crew would fly to the Tiangong space station as the crew of Shenzhou 13 in October 2021.
