= Chinese women in space =

History of female astronauts in China

As of 2026, the People's Republic of China has sent four women to space: Liu Yang, Wang Yaping, Wang Haoze and Lai Ka-ying all of whom are taikonauts in the People's Liberation Army Astronaut Corps (PLAAC). Liu Yang, China's first female taikonaut, first flew in 2012 aboard Shenzhou 9, and since then four additional missions have included female crew members: Shenzhou 10, 13, 14, 19 and 23. According to the China National Space Administration, many women also hold leadership positions in the Chinese space program, and actively contribute to the Chinese space effort.

== History ==
China launched its first crewed space mission, Shenzhou 5, in 2003, with a single male taikonaut (Yang Liwei) aboard. Following the mission's success, Gu Xiulian, president of the All-China Women's Federation (ACWF), recommended to the Chinese space program that women should be considered for spaceflight selection. This recommendation was accepted, and was publicly announced in early 2004. Women's integration into the space program necessitated minor changes to the interior design of the Shenzhou spacecraft to accommodate both male and female taikonauts.

Although women were officially allowed to become taikonauts as of 2004, the first Chinese spaceflight with a female crewmember was not launched until 2012. This mission, Shenzhou 9, included taikonaut Liu Yang as Laboratory Assistant, making her the first Chinese woman to fly in space. Shenzhou 9 was launched on 16 June 2012, the 49th launch anniversary of Vostok 6, the first mission to put a woman (Soviet parachutist Valentina Tereshkova) into space.

On 11 June 2013, Shenzhou 10 launched with taikonaut Wang Yaping aboard as Laboratory Assistant, making her the second Chinese woman in space. Wang Yaping became the first Chinese woman to travel to space twice and the first to visit the Tiangong space station in October of 2021, when she launched aboard Shenzhou 13.

Liu Yang would return to space in 2022, flying aboard Shenzhou 14.

In 2026, Lai Ka-ying was sent onboard Shenzhou 23 as a Payload specialist making her the first Hong Kong citizen to travel to space.

== Female taikonauts ==
=== Liu Yang ===
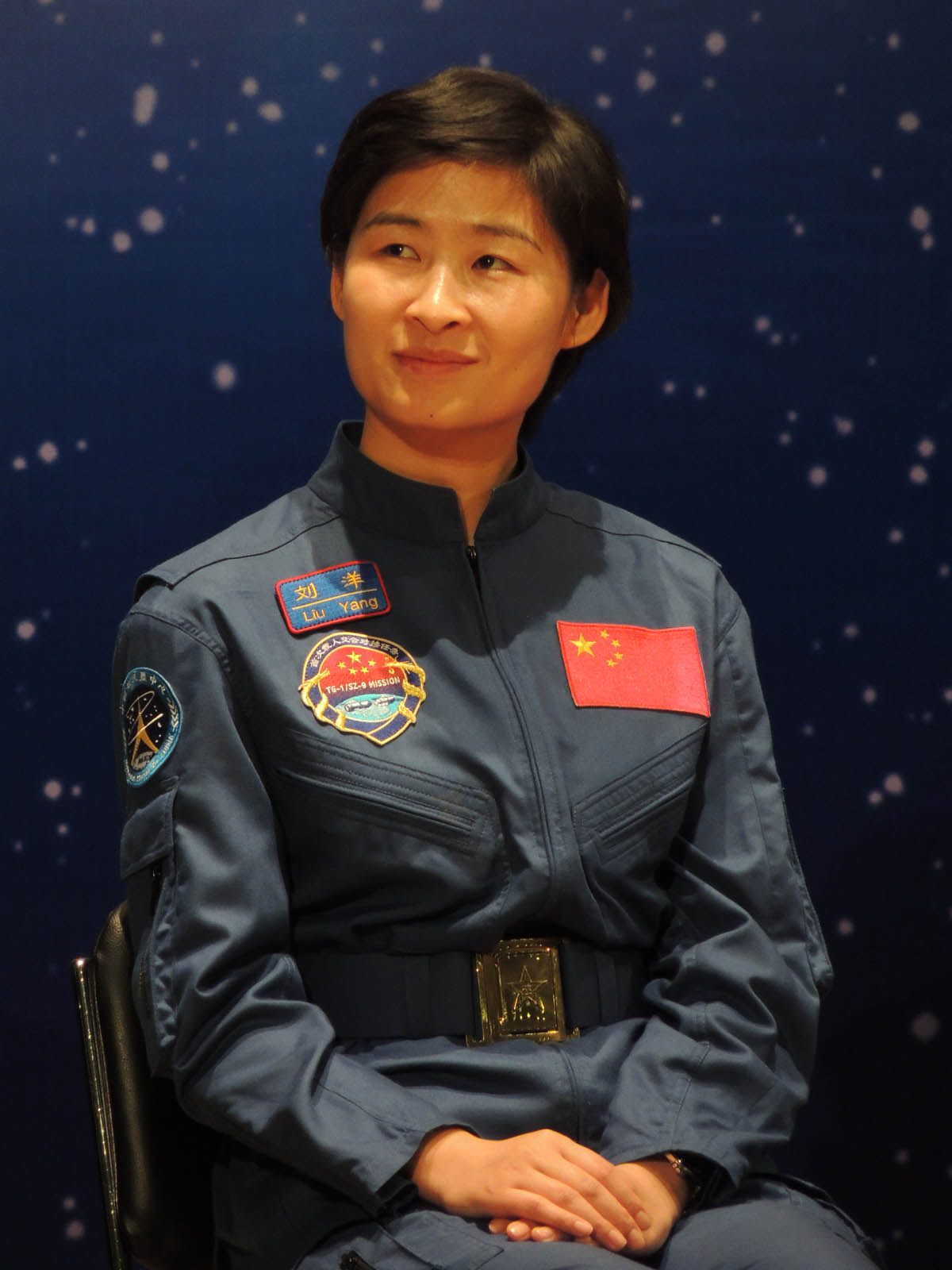
Liu Yang, the first Chinese woman in space

Liu Yang became the first female Chinese taikonaut in 2012. Throughout her astronautical career, Liu has been awarded the title of "Heroic Astronaut" and received the Third-class Space Service Medal for her work aboard the Shenzhou-9 and Shenzhou-14 missions, respectively.

Showing exemplary academic performance in her formative schooling years, Liu's professors signed her up in 1997 to attend the People's Liberation Army's (PLA) Air Force Aviation University in Changchun to become a pilot. Liu excelled in her training flying cargo planes and eventually became the Deputy Head of her flying unit. In May 2010, Yang was approached by the PLA's taikonaut corps with an offer to join.

Liu flew her first mission aboard the Shenzhou-9 in 2012, during which the three-person crew achieved China's first crewed docking mission by joining with the Tiangong-1 experimental space station. On this mission, Liu performed the first manual docking of the flight and was in charge of medical experiments throughout the flight's duration. The taikonauts returned 12 days after takeoff.

After returning to Earth, Liu became a representative in the 13th National People's Congress and the vice president of the All-China Women's Federation.

Liu returned to space in 2022 aboard the Shenzhou-14, with the goal of staying on the Tiangong space station for six months to oversee the final portions of construction.

=== Wang Yaping ===
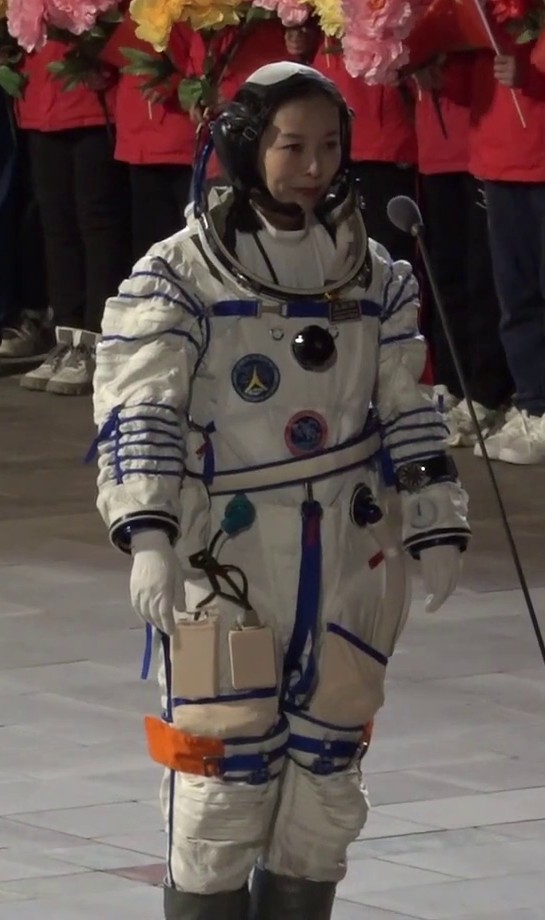
Wang Yaping, the first Chinese woman to walk in space

Wang Yaping's space career began in 2013 aboard the Shenzhou-10 where she became the second female taikonaut. During this mission, Wang and her two colleagues successfully docked, undocked, and boarded the Tiangong-1. From the space station, she gave a live-streamed physics lesson to around 80,000 schools, reaching 60 million students and teachers. Wang returned to Earth aboard the Shenzhou-10 15 days after takeoff.

Wang returned to space on the Shenzhou-13 on 15 October 2021, becoming the first female to live onboard the Tiangong space station. On 8 November 2021, she completed a 6.5 hour spacewalk making her the 16th female astronaut and first female taikonaut to do so. Wang returned to Earth aboard the Shenzhou-13 in April 2022, 182 days after takeoff. Wang and her 2 colleagues set a record for most days in orbit by any Taikonaut.

=== Wang Haoze ===
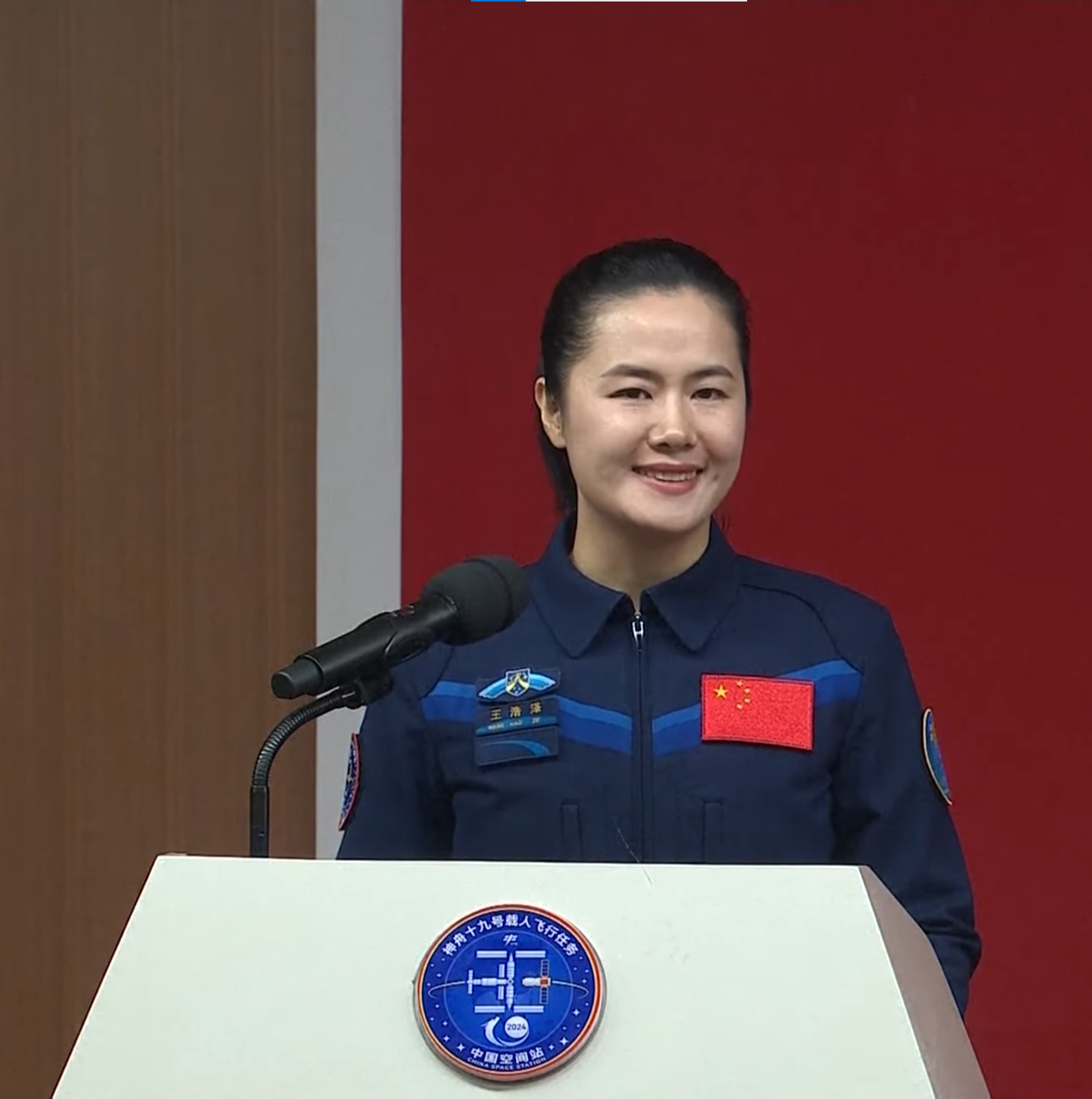
Wang Haoze at Shenzhou-19 press conference

Wang Haoze was the first Chinese female taikonaut from Group 3. She flew on Shenzhou 19 in October 2024 and is the only female spaceflight engineer. She was also the first female taikonaut of Manchu ethnicity on space.

=== Lai Ka-ying ===
Dr. Lai Ka-ying is the first Hong Kong female taikonaut. She flew on Shenzhou 23 in May 2026.

== Obstacles ==
According to Jun Lu, Senior Engineer at Beijing Institute of Tracking and Telecommunications Technology and Deputy Chief Designer of BeiDou Grounded Test and Validation System, "[women's] qualities of being meticulous, dedicated, responsible and their ability to work under high pressure for a long time" allow them to thrive in the field due to the "high risk and long development cycle" of space technology development. However, Chinese taikonaut academies institute more stringent qualifications for female taikonauts than their male counterparts. Due to fears that childbirth and subsequent family obligations would disrupt training for two to three years, taikonaut academies favor women who are married and already have children. Additionally, women are more closely examined for scars, heavy odors, and decayed teeth, as these traits could cause "disaster" in space.

Prior to the launch of Shenzhou 9, Chinese state news agency Xinhua reported a former spaceflight official as claiming that marriage was a requirement for all female Chinese astronauts due to concerns that spaceflight could potentially harm women's fertility and also "married women would be more physically and psychologically mature." However, this requirement has been officially denied by the director of the China Astronaut Centre, stating that this is a preference but not a strict limitation.

When interviewing women taikonauts, the media was more interested in their family lives and female physiology than when interviewing male taikonauts. Questions regarding menstruation are often brought up as well.

Pang Zhihao, a Chinese National Space Administration official, claims women taikonauts should also look their best at all times. He revealed that both Tiangong-1 and Tiangong were stocked with hygiene products and cosmetics during Wang Yaping's missions. In a video broadcast by China Central Television, he declares that "[f]emale astronauts may be in better condition after putting on makeup".

== Non-taikonaut personnel ==
A study published in the National Science Review found that women make up a large portion of space engineers working on Chinese missions. The Chinese BeiDou Navigation Satellite System has three Chinese women leading the project as sub-system chief designers, with others filling senior positions such as deputy commanders and deputy chief engineers.

One notable woman working on China's space program is 24-year-old Zhou Chengyu, the first and youngest female space commander in China. She first began working at the Wenchang site as an operator after she graduated from university at the beginning of 2020 and, by the end of the year, had become the commander of her unit. She worked on the rocket connector system for the Chang'e-5 moon mission, which aimed to collect moon rocks for scientific testing. Chang'e-5 successfully launched in December 2020. Zhou went viral on social media for her accomplishments, with many users calling her a "frontline soldier in the field of aerospace" and a "big sister".

== List of Chinese women in space by mission ==
Name	Mission	Date	Notes
Liu Yang	Shenzhou 9 Shenzhou 14	2012; 2022	First Chinese woman in space
Wang Yaping	Shenzhou 10; Shenzhou 13	2013; 2021‍–‍2022	First Chinese woman to travel twice to space, first woman to visit the Tiangong space station and first woman to walk in space
Wang Haoze	Shenzhou 19	2024‍–‍2025	
Lai Ka-ying	Shenzhou 23	2026	Also first resident of Hong Kong in space

== Firsts and records ==
Firsts
First	Date	Mission	Name	Ref
First Chinese woman in space	16 June 2012	Shenzhou 9	Liu Yang	
First Chinese woman in orbit	16 June 2012	Shenzhou 9	Liu Yang	
First Chinese woman aboard a space station	18 June 2012	Shenzhou 9	Liu Yang	
First Chinese woman to spacewalk	7 November 2021	Shenzhou 13	Wang Yaping	
First Chinese woman to command a mission	—N/a	—N/a	—N/a	
First Chinese woman to go on multiple missions	15 October 2021	Shenzhou 13	Wang Yaping	

Records As of 8 November 2023
Title	Data	Taikonaut
Longest time in space (single mission)	182 days, 9 hours and 32 minutes (Shenzhou 13)	Wang Yaping
Longest time in space (cumulative)	197 days and 1 minute (Shenzhou 10 and Shenzhou 13)	Wang Yaping
Shortest time in space (single mission)	12 days, 15 hours and 25 minutes (Shenzhou 9)	Liu Yang
Shortest time in space (cumulative)	195 days and 50 minutes (Shenzhou 9 and Shenzhou 14)	Liu Yang
Longest time on EVA (single spacewalk)	6 hours 25 minutes (Shenzhou 13)	Wang Yaping
Longest time on EVA (cumulative)	6 hours 25 minutes (Shenzhou 13)	Wang Yaping
Shortest time on EVA (single spacewalk)	6 hours 7 minutes (Shenzhou 14)	Liu Yang
Shortest time on EVA (cumulative)	6 hours 7 minutes (Shenzhou 14)	Liu Yang
Most space missions	2 missions	Wang Yaping; Liu Yang

== See also ==
- List of Chinese astronauts
- List of women astronauts
- People's Liberation Army Astronaut Corps – Unit of the Chinese military responsible for the training of astronauts
- Women in space – Women who travel to space
