= Song Lingdong =

Chinese astronaut (born 1990)

- 宋令东
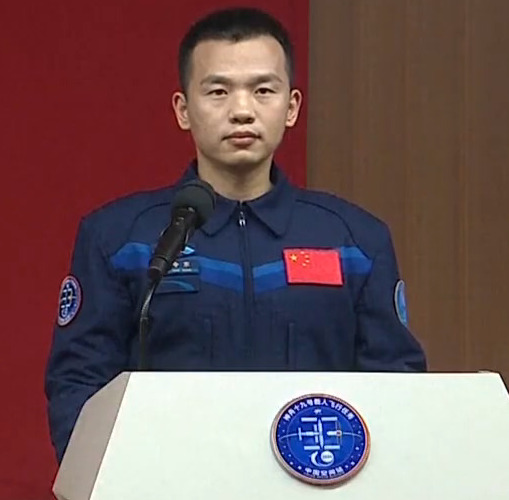
- Born: August 1990 (age 36); Heze, Shandong, China
- Space career

PLAAC astronaut
- Previous occupation: People's Liberation Army Air Force fighter pilot
- Status: Active
- Rank: Lieutenant colonel, People's Liberation Army Ground Force
- Time in space: 182 days, 8 hours and 42 minutes
- Selection: Chinese Group 3 (2020)
- Missions: Shenzhou 19

Chinese name
- Simplified Chinese: 宋令东
- Traditional Chinese: 宋令東
Transcriptions
Standard Mandarin
- Hanyu Pinyin: Sòng Lìngdōng

Song Lingdong (Chinese: 宋令东; born August 1990) is a Chinese People's Liberation Army Astronaut Corps (PLAAC) taikonaut selected as part of the Shenzhou program.

== Biography ==
Song was born in Heze, Shandong, in August 1990. In 2007, he enrolled at Air Force Aviation University. He enlisted in the People's Liberation Army (PLA) in September 2008, and joined the Chinese Communist Party (CCP) in March 2013.

Song was an air force pilot.

On 29 October 2024, Cai Xuzhe, Song Lingdong and Wang Haoze were assigned to the Shenzhou 19 crewed spaceflight mission. Then, on 17 December 2024, during this mission's first EVA, he broke the record with Cai Xuzhe for the longest spacewalk in human history, of 9 hours and 6 minutes, with the assistance of the space station's robotic arms and ground-based scientific personnel, completed tasks such as the installation of space debris protection devices, inspection, and maintenance of external equipment and facilities.

== See also ==
- List of Chinese astronauts
- Tiangong space station
