= Shenzhou 9 =

2012 Chinese crewed spaceflight to Tiangong-1

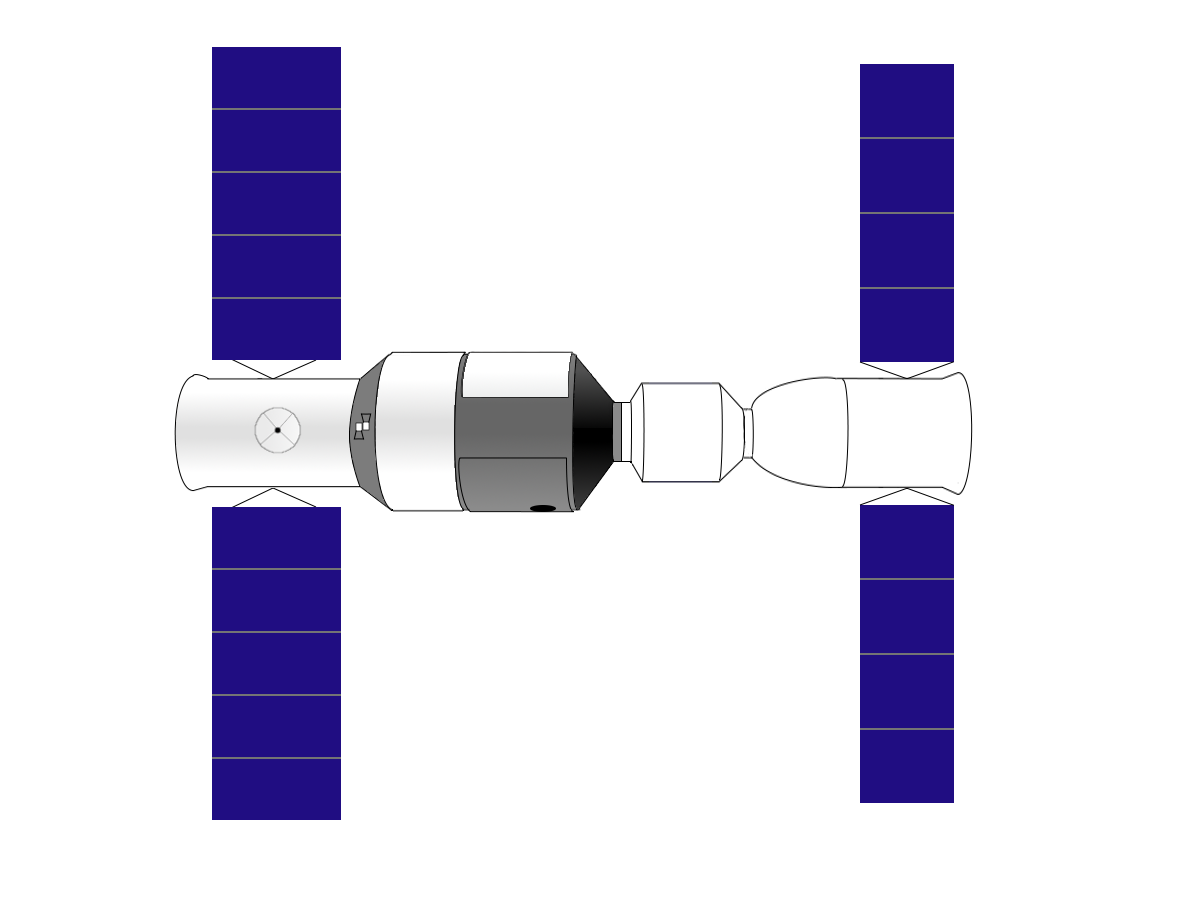
- Diagram of Shenzhou 9 (right) docked with Tiangong-1 (left)
- Mission type: Crewed test flight
- Operator: China Manned Space Agency
- COSPAR ID: 2012-032A
- SATCAT no.: 38461
- Mission duration: 12 days, 15 hours, 23 minutes
- Orbits completed: 198

Spacecraft properties
- Spacecraft type: Shenzhou
- Manufacturer: China Aerospace Science and Technology Corporation

Crew
- Crew size: 3
- Members: Jing Haipeng; Liu Wang; Liu Yang

Start of mission
- Launch date: 16 June 2012, 10:37:24 UTC
- Rocket: Long March 2F/G (Y9)
- Launch site: Jiuquan, LA-4/SLS-1
- Contractor: China Academy of Launch Vehicle Technology

End of mission
- Landing date: 29 June 2012, 02:01:16 UTC
- Landing site: Inner Mongolia (42°15′47.81″N 111°16′44.44″E)

Orbital parameters
- Reference system: Geocentric orbit
- Regime: Low Earth orbit
- Perigee altitude: 200 km (120 mi)
- Apogee altitude: 330 km (210 mi)
- Inclination: 42.836°

Docking with Tiangong-1
- Docking date: 18 June 2012, 06:07:04 UTC
- Undocking date: 24 June 2012, 03:08 UTC
- Time docked: 5 days, 21 hours

Docking with Tiangong-1
- Docking date: 24 June 2012, 04:38 UTC
- Undocking date: 28 June 2012, 01:22 UTC
- Time docked: 3 days, 20 hours, 44 minutes
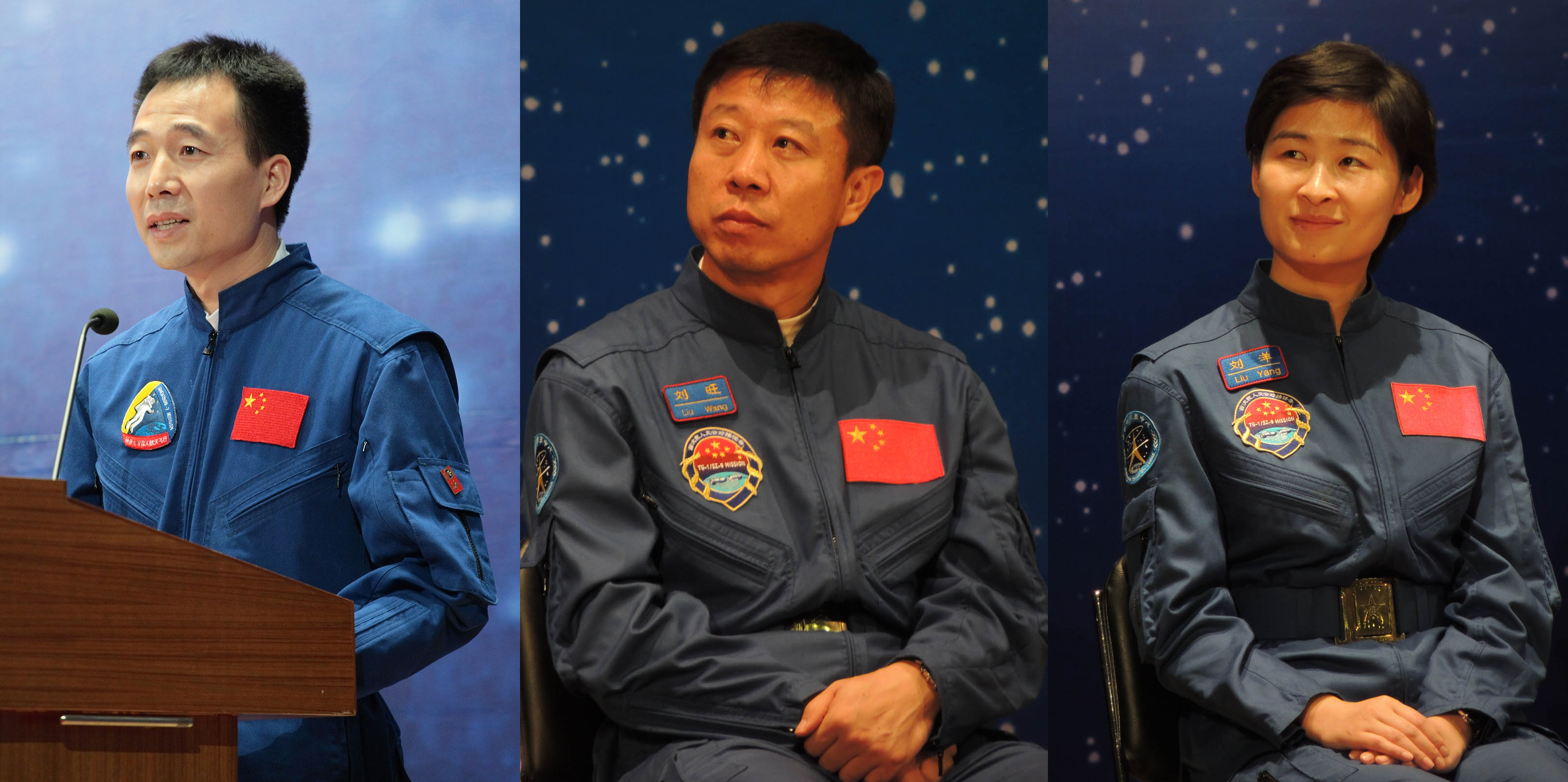
- Mission insignia From left: Jing Haipeng, Liu Wang, and Liu Yang Shenzhou program

Shenzhou 9 (simplified Chinese: 神舟九号; traditional Chinese: 神舟九號; pinyin: Shénzhōu jiǔ hào) was the fourth crewed spacecraft flight of China's Shenzhou program, launched at 18:37:24 CST (10:37:24 UTC), 16 June 2012. Shenzhou 9 was the second spacecraft and first crewed mission and expedition to dock with the Tiangong-1 space station, which took place on 18 June. The Shenzhou 9 spacecraft landed at 10:01:16 CST (02:01:16 UTC) on 29 June in the Inner Mongolia Autonomous Region. The mission's crew included the first Chinese female astronaut, Liu Yang.

== History ==
On 12 March 2012, it was announced that the initial crew selection roster for the mission included female astronauts. The crew were unveiled to the press on 15 June. China's first female astronaut would be Liu Yang. Liu was selected ahead of her fellow female astronaut prospect Wang Yaping. This mission also featured the first repeat astronaut, Jing Haipeng, the commander of the mission. Shenzhou 9 was the 9th flight in China's Shenzhou program and the fourth crewed spaceflight. The mission's launch was 49 years to the day after that of the first woman in space, cosmonaut Valentina Tereshkova.

== Mission preparations ==
The Shenzhou 9 spacecraft arrived at the Jiuquan Satellite Launch Center in the northwestern Gobi Desert on 9 April 2012 and its carrier rocket, the Long March 2F, arrived on 9 May. On 9 June 2012, the Shenzhou 9 spacecraft and its carrier rocket were rolled out to launch pad. On 12 June 2012 underwent system-wide joint exercises, and final health checks were completed the following day.

=== Expedition ceremony ===
On 16 June 2012, the expedition ceremony was held at the Jiuquan Satellite Launch Center. National People's Congress Standing Committee Chairman Wu Bangguo attended the ceremony. The astronauts, Liu Wang, Liu Yang, and Jing Haipeng, rode to the launch tower and turned in the entrance with the assistance of support staff.

== Mission ==
The Long March 2F rocket was launched on 16 June 2012 at 10:37 UTC.

Shenzhou 9 docked with China's first space lab Tiangong-1 at 06:07 UTC on 18 June, marking China's first crewed spacecraft rendezvous and docking. This docking was remotely controlled from a ground station. After about 3 hours, when the pressures inside the vessels were equalized, Jing Haipeng entered into Tiangong-1. Six days later, Shenzhou 9 detached from the station and then redocked manually under the control of crew member Liu Wang, making it the first manual docking for the Chinese program.

Shenzhou 9 landed by parachute in Siziwang Banner, Inner Mongolia on 29 June 2012.

== Crew ==
Prime crew
Position	Crew
Commander	Jing Haipeng; Second spaceflight
Operator	Liu Wang; First spaceflight
Laboratory Assistant	Liu Yang; First spaceflight

On this mission, Commander Jing Haipeng became the first Chinese astronaut to fly more than once in space and Liu Yang became the first Chinese woman in space.

Backup crew
Position	Crew
Commander	Nie Haisheng
Operator	Zhang Xiaoguang
Laboratory Assistant	Wang Yaping

The backup crew later became the prime crew for Shenzhou 10.

== Mission timeline ==
9 April 2012

- Shenzhou 9 space capsule arrives at the Jiuquan Satellite Launch Center

9 May 2012

- Long March 2F space launcher arrives at the Jiuquan Satellite Launch Center

9 June 2012

- Launch stack rolled out to the launch pad

15 June 2012

- Crew unveiled

16 June 2012

- Launch, first woman in space for the Chinese program, first repeat traveller for the Chinese program, first crewed mission to a space station for the Chinese program

18 June 2012

- First crewed rendezvous for the Chinese space program.
- Automated docking with Tiangong-1, first crewed docking by the Chinese program

24 June 2012

- Shenzhou 9 undocks with Tiangong-1
- Shenzhou 9 redocks with Tiangong-1, first manual docking by the Chinese space program, second crewed docking by the program

29 June 2012

- Shenzhou 9 landed in Siziwang Banner, Inner Mongolia.

== See also ==
- Chinese space program
  - Chinese women in space
- Tiangong program
- Long March 2F
- Yang Liwei
