= Wang Haoze =

Chinese astronaut (born 1990)

- 王浩泽
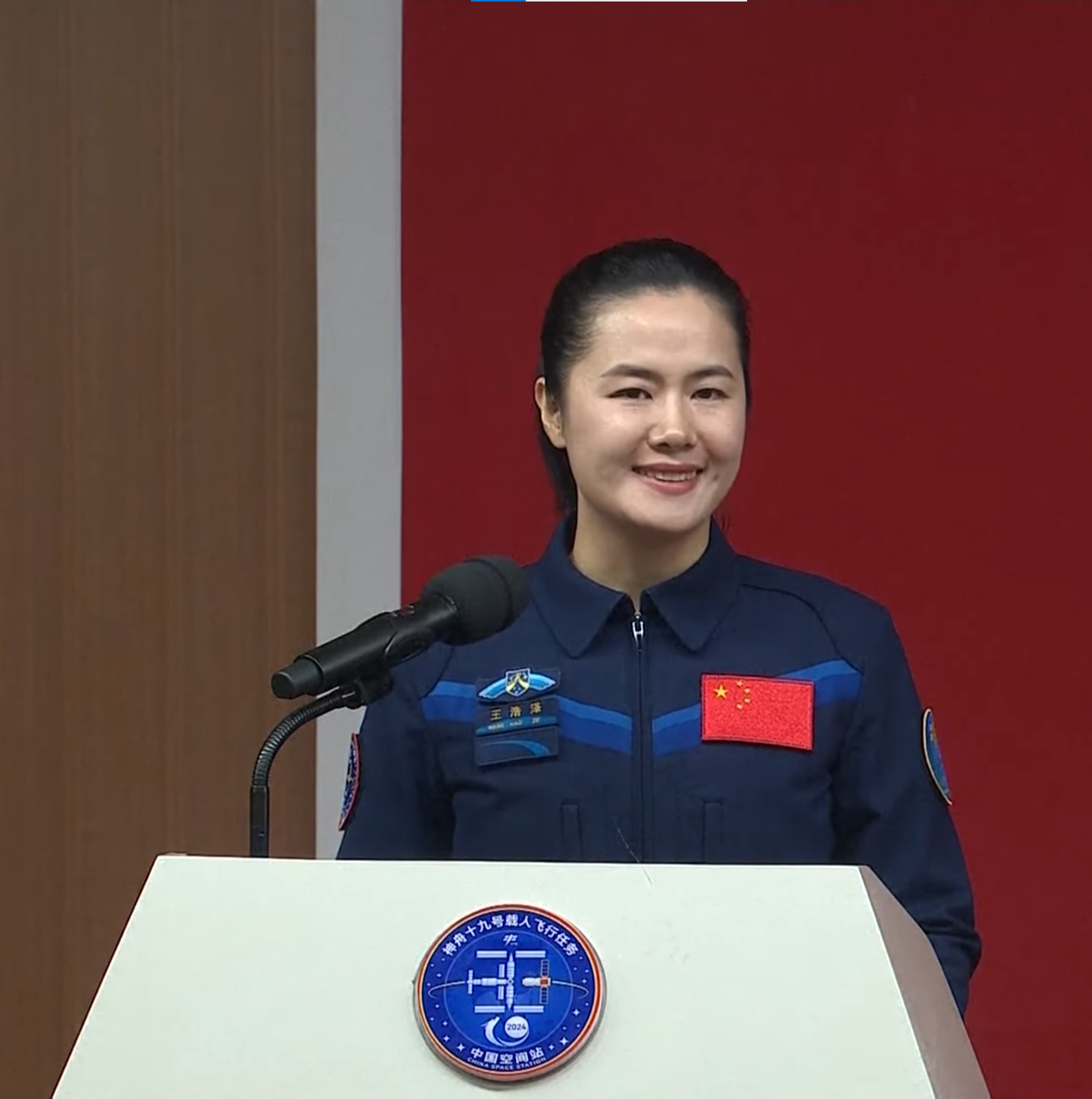
- Wang Haoze in 2024
- Born: March 1990 (age 36); Luanping, Hebei Province, China
- Education: Southeast University
- Space career

PLAAC astronaut
- Current occupation: Flight engineer
- Status: Active
- Rank: Lieutenant Colonel
- Time in space: 182 days, 8 hours and 42 minutes
- Selection: Chinese Group 3 (2020)
- Missions: Shenzhou 19

Wang Haoze
- Traditional Chinese: 王浩澤
- Simplified Chinese: 王浩泽
Transcriptions
Standard Mandarin
- Hanyu Pinyin: Wáng Hàozé

Wang Haoze (Chinese: 王浩泽; born March 1990), is a Chinese aerospace engineer and astronaut. She is China's third female astronaut to space, and first woman engineer, as one of the crew members of Shenzhou 19 mission.

She served as a senior engineer at the 11th Institute of Aerospace Propulsion Technology within the China Aerospace Science and Technology Group (CASTG) and was chosen as part of the third cohort of astronauts in September 2020. Currently, she holds the position of aerospace flight engineer in the People's Liberation Army Astronaut Corps, classified as a fourth-class astronaut, with the rank of lieutenant colonel in the Army.

== Biography ==
Wang Haoze was born in 1990 in Luanping County, Chengde, Hebei Province, China, to a father employed as a traffic police officer and a mother who worked as a middle school teacher. Upon her admission to Southeast University, where she majored in Thermal and Power Engineering, Wang joined the Chinese Communist Party in December 2009. She also participated in the university's track and field team, frequently representing Southeast University at the Jiangsu Provincial Games, while consistently achieving excellent academic results. Consequently, she was assured admission to pursue a master's degree in Engineering Thermal Physics, specialising in plasma detonation. Before completing her master's degree, she joined the China Aerospace Science and Technology Group (CASTG) to engage in the preliminary research of rocket engines. Subsequently, she participated in the third cohort of China's astronaut selection and was officially chosen as one of the astronauts in September 2020.

In 2023, she was chosen for the Shenzhou 19 crew, becoming China's first female aerospace flight engineer and the nation's third female astronaut, as well as the second astronaut and first female astronaut from an ethnic minority, following Zhang Xiaoguang, who is also Manchu.

== See also ==
- List of Chinese astronauts
- Chinese space programme
- Women in space
  - List of female astronauts
  - Chinese women in space
