= List of longest spacewalks =

This is a list of the 29 longest spacewalks, also known as an extravehicular activity or EVA. "Agency" here refers to the organization under whose auspices the EVA was conducted (so a Swiss or Japanese astronaut would be listed under NASA if they wore NASA suits and were controlled by Mission Control Houston).

For details, see lists of spacewalks from 1965–1999, 2000–2014, and 2015-present.

== List ==
Number	EVA crew	Agency	Flight/mission	Date	Total time hours:minutes	References
1	Cai Xuzhe and Song Lingdong	CMSA	Shenzhou 19	17 December 2024	9:06	
2	James Voss and Susan Helms	NASA	STS-102	11 March 2001	8:56	
3	Pierre Thuot, Richard Hieb and Thomas Akers	NASA	STS-49	13 May 1992	8:29	
4	Ye Guangfu and Li Guangsu	CMSA	Shenzhou 18	28 May 2024	8:23	
5 (tie)	Zhang Lu and Wu Fei	CMSA	Shenzhou 21	9 December 2025	8:17	
5 (tie)	Cai Xuzhe and Song Lingdong	CMSA	Shenzhou 19	20 January 2025	8:17	
5 (tie)	Sunita Williams and Akihiko Hoshide (Japan)	NASA	Expedition 32	30 August 2012	8:17	
8	Steven Smith and John Grunsfeld	NASA	STS-103	22 December 1999	8:15	
9	Alexander Misurkin and Anton Shkaplerov	Roscosmos	Expedition 54	2 February 2018	8:13	
10	Michael Foale and Claude Nicollier (Switzerland)	NASA	STS-103	23 December 1999	8:10	
11	Steven Smith and John Grunsfeld	NASA	STS-103	24 December 1999	8:08	
12 (tie)	Oleg Kotov and Sergey Ryazansky	Roscosmos	Expedition 38	27 December 2013	8:07	
12 (tie)	Andrew J. Feustel and Michael Fincke	NASA	STS-134	22 May 2011	8:07	
14	Douglas H. Wheelock and Tracy Caldwell Dyson	NASA	Expedition 24	7 August 2010	8:03	
15	Michael J. Massimino and Michael T. Good	NASA	STS-125	17 May 2009	8:02	
16	Chen Dong and Chen Zhongrui	CMSA	Shenzhou 20	22 May 2025	7:59	
17 (tie)	Rex J. Walheim and Stanley G. Love	NASA	STS-122	11 February 2008	7:58	
17 (tie)	James F. Reilly and John D. Olivas	NASA	STS-117	15 June 2007	7:58	
19	Michael J. Massimino and Michael T. Good	NASA	STS-125	15 May 2009	7:56	
20 (tie)	Jing Haipeng and Zhu Yangzhu	CMSA	Shenzhou 16	20 July 2023	7:55	
20 (tie)	Sergey Prokopyev and Dmitry Petelin	Roscosmos	Expedition 69	19 April 2023	7:55	
20 (tie)	Michael Lopez-Alegria and Sunita Williams	NASA	Expedition 14	31 January 2007	7:55	
20 (tie)	Tamara E. Jernigan and Daniel T. Barry	NASA	STS-96	30 May 1999	7:55	
24	Oleg Novitsky and Pyotr Dubrov	Roscosmos	Expedition 65	3 September 2021	7:54	
25	Tang Hongbo and Jiang Xinlin	CMSA	Shenzhou 17	2 March 2024	7:52	
26 (tie)	Fei Junlong and Zhang Lu	CMSA	Shenzhou 15	28 February 2023	7:50	
26 (tie)	Story Musgrave and Jeffrey Hoffman	NASA	STS-61	5 December 1993	7:50	
28 (tie)	Scott Kelly and Kjell N. Lindgren	NASA	Expedition 45	6 November 2015	7:48	
28 (tie)	Steven Smith and Rex Walheim	NASA	STS-110	11 April 2002	7:48	

== See also ==
- List of spacewalkers
- List of spacewalks and moonwalks 1965–1999
- List of spacewalks 2000–2014
- List of spacewalks since 2015
- List of cumulative spacewalk records
