= Shenzhou 13 =

2021 Chinese crewed spaceflight to the Tiangong Space Station

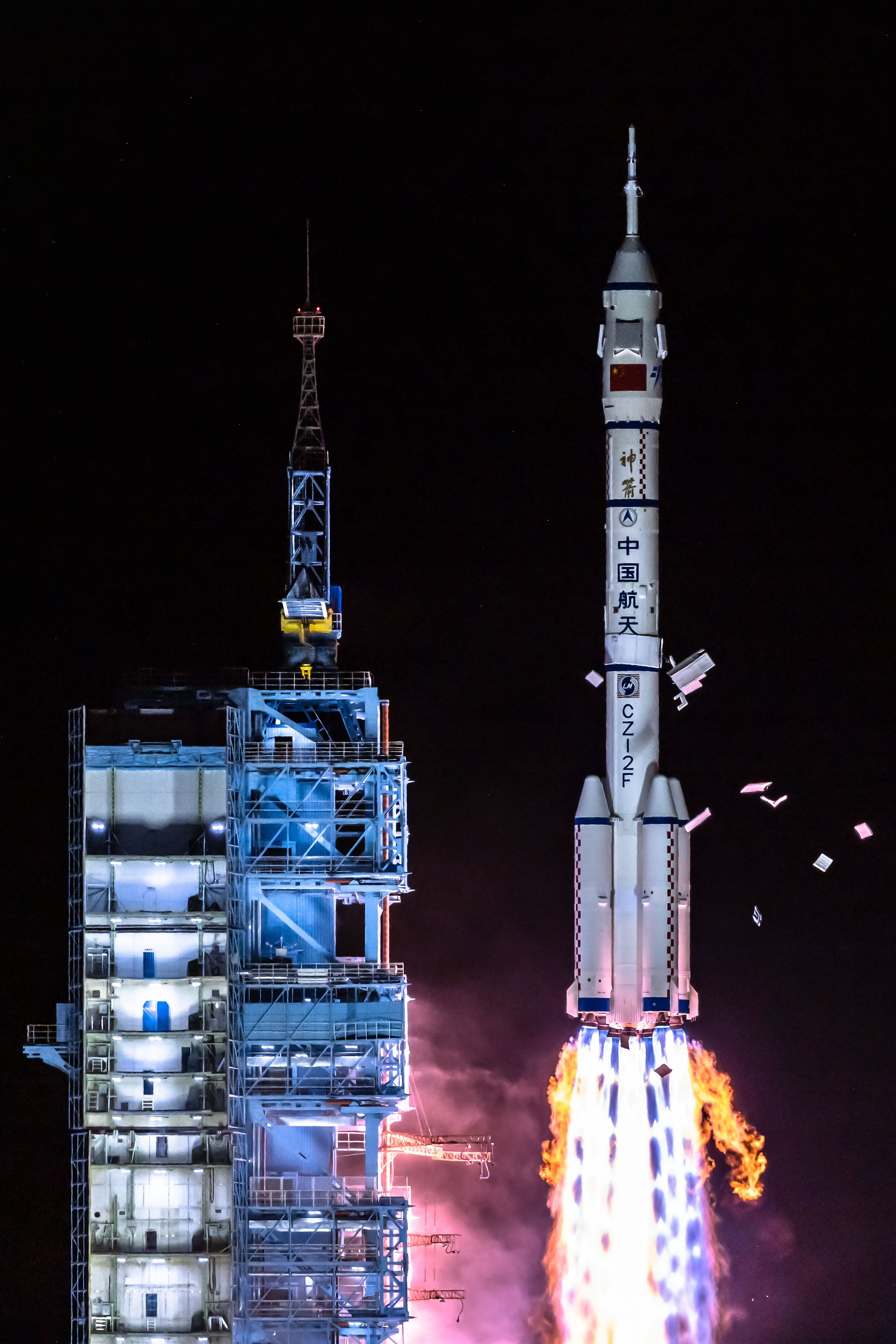
- Launch of Shenzhou 13 on a Long March 2F/G rocket
- Mission type: Tiangong space station crew transport
- Operator: China Manned Space Agency
- COSPAR ID: 2021-092A
- SATCAT no.: 49326
- Mission duration: 182 days, 9 hours, 32 minutes

Spacecraft properties
- Spacecraft type: Shenzhou
- Manufacturer: China Aerospace Science and Technology Corporation

Crew
- Crew size: 3
- Members: Zhai Zhigang; Wang Yaping; Ye Guangfu
- EVAs: 2
- EVA duration: 12 hours, 36 minutes

Start of mission
- Launch date: 15 October 2021, 16:23:56 UTC (16 October, 00:23:56 CST)
- Rocket: Long March 2F/G (Y13)
- Launch site: Jiuquan, LA-4/SLS
- Contractor: China Academy of Launch Vehicle Technology

End of mission
- Landing date: 16 April 2022, 01:56:35 UTC
- Landing site: Inner Mongolia (41°39′13″N 100°09′38″E)

Orbital parameters
- Reference system: Geocentric orbit
- Regime: Low Earth orbit
- Perigee altitude: 330 km (210 mi)
- Apogee altitude: 340 km (210 mi)
- Inclination: 42.4°

Docking with Tiangong space station
- Docking port: Tianhe nadir
- Docking date: 15 October 2021, 22:56 UTC
- Undocking date: 15 April 2022, 16:44 UTC
- Time docked: 181 days, 17 hours, 48 minutes
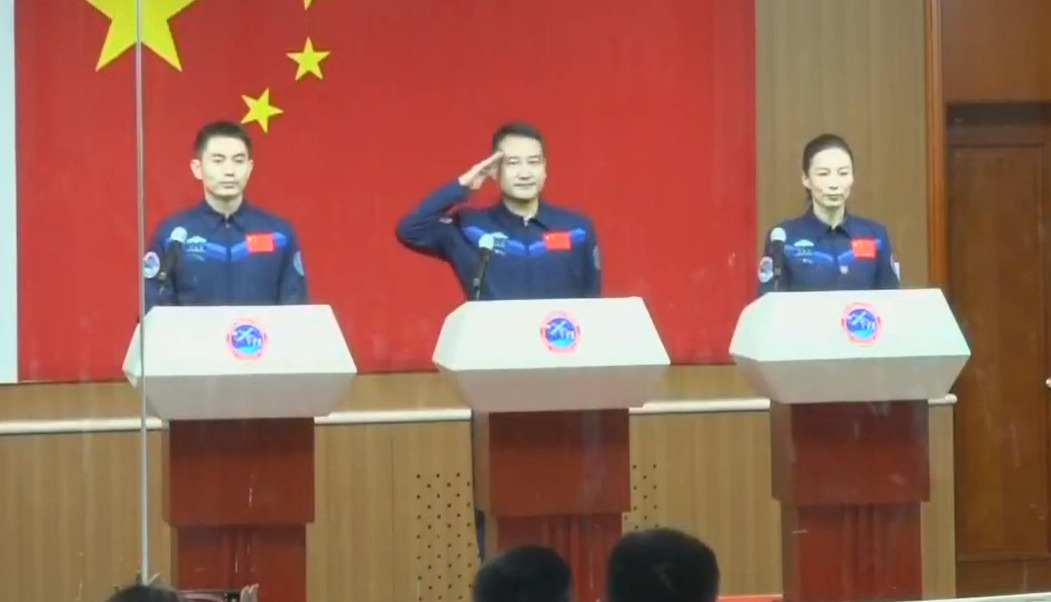
- Mission insignia From left: Ye Guangfu, Zhai Zhigang and Wang Yaping Shenzhou program

Shenzhou 13 (simplified Chinese: 神舟十三号; traditional Chinese: 神舟十三號; pinyin: Shénzhōu shísān hào) was a Chinese spaceflight to the Tiangong space station, launched on 16 October 2021. It carried three People's Liberation Army Astronaut Corps (PLAAC) taikonauts on board a Shenzhou spacecraft. The mission was the eighth crewed Chinese spaceflight and the thirteenth flight overall of the Shenzhou program.

== Background ==
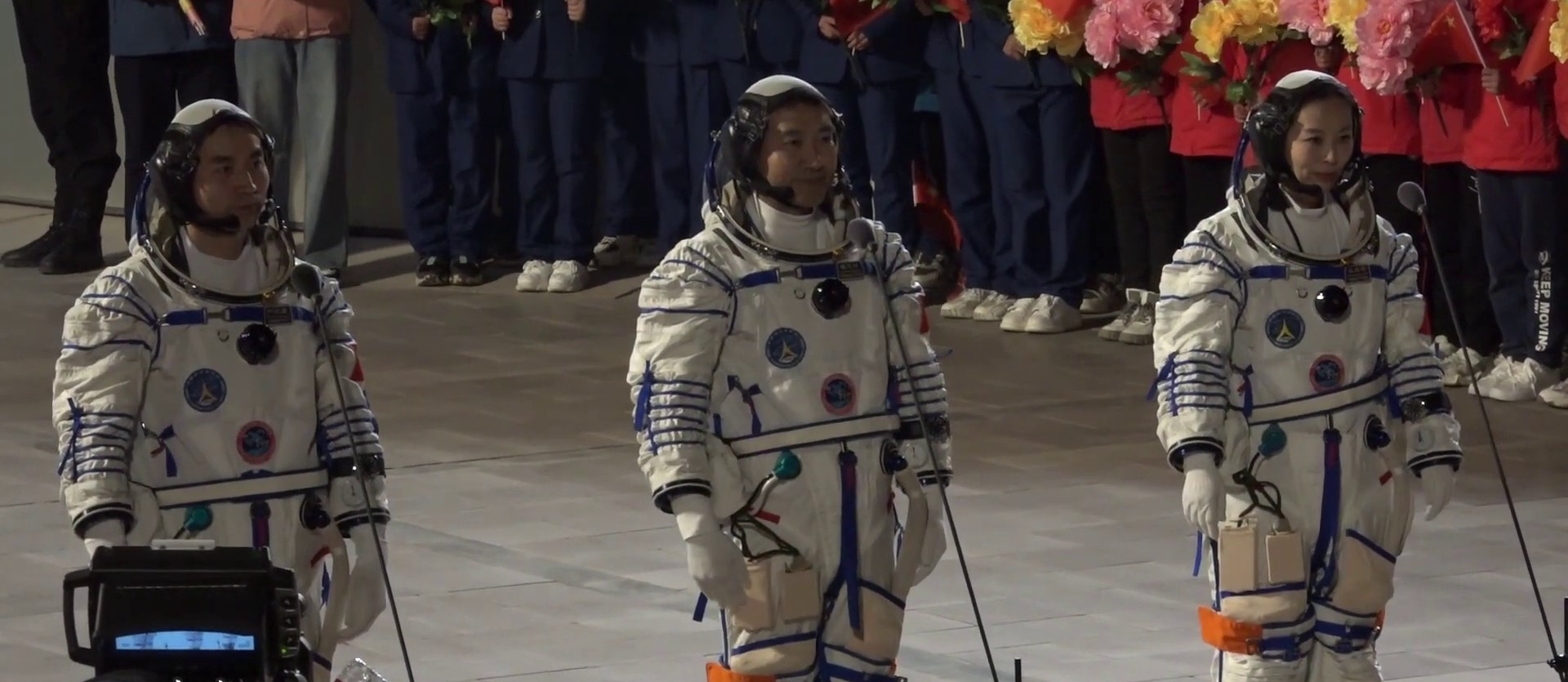
Shenzhou 13 crew during a pre-launch farewell ceremony

Shenzhou 13 was the second spaceflight to the Tiangong space station (at the time consisting only of the Tianhe core module), and the first with a planned duration of six months (180 days). Following Shenzhou 13, six months would become the standard orbital duration for subsequent Shenzhou missions.

For Shenzhou 13, the China Academy of Space Technology developed a new method of radial docking of the spacecraft to the bottom of Tiangong's Tianhe core module, differing from the front and rear docking method used previously by Shenzhou 12 and the Tianzhou cargo missions. This new method of docking would be crucial for both cargo logistics and crew operations, and would allow multiple Shenzhou spacecraft to dock to Tiangong at one time, making in-space crew changeovers possible for the first time.

The crew of Shenzhou 13 was announced on 14 October 2021.

== Mission ==
The flight launched from Jiuquan Satellite Launch Center on 15 October 2021 at 16:23 UTC, following the launch of the Tianzhou 3 cargo spacecraft. Just over 6.5 hours after launch, the spacecraft docked with the Tianhe core module's nadir docking port. The crew entered the station on 16 October at 01:58 UTC.

During the mission, the Shenzhou 14 spacecraft remained on standby to serve as an emergency rescue vehicle.

The Shenzhou 13 crew carried out two spacewalks, worked on payloads both inside and outside the station, and carried out other scientific work during the six-month mission.

=== Spacewalks ===
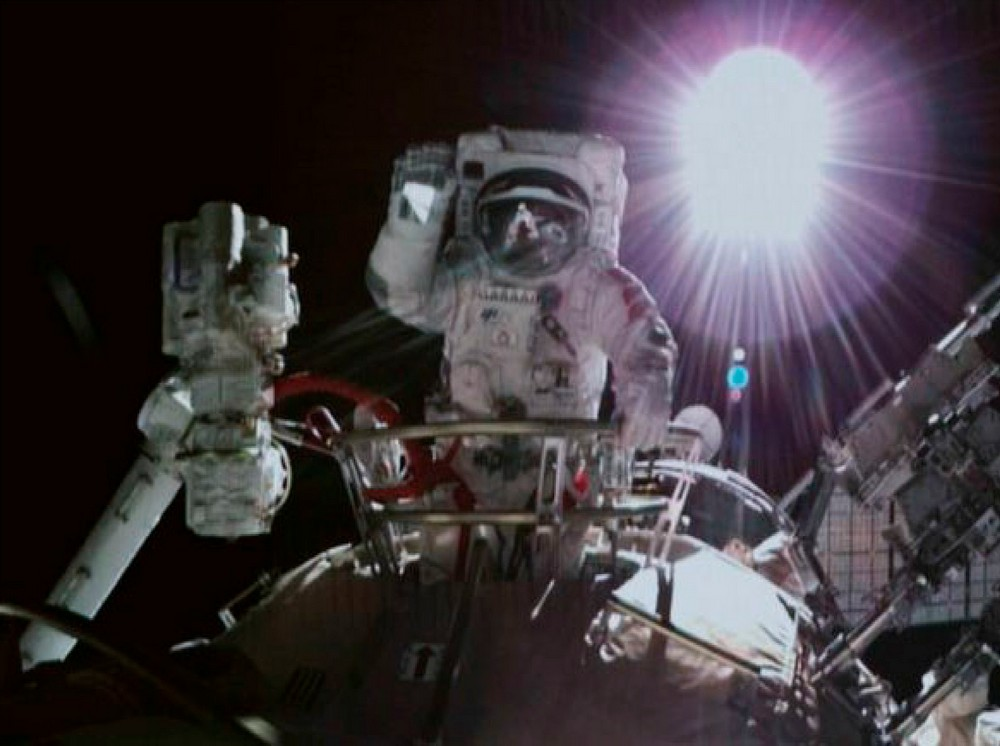
Zhai Zhigang performing a spacewalk outside Tiangong on November 7, 2021

On 7 November 2021, the first scheduled spacewalk of Shenzhou 13 was carried out by Zhai Zhigang and Wang Yaping, during which Wang Yaping became the first Chinese woman to perform a spacewalk. The two taikonauts installed a dual-arm connector for the station's robotic arm, and tested EVA equipment on the exterior of Tianhe. The spacewalk lasted for 6 hours and 25 minutes.

On 26 December 2021, the second and final spacewalk of the mission was carried out by Zhai Zhigang and Ye Guangfu, with Wang Yaping assisting the pair from inside the Tianhe core module. The taikonauts deployed panoramic camera C, installed a foot restraint platform, and tested various methods of moving objects outside the station. The spacewalk lasted for 6 hours and 11 minutes.

=== Space lectures ===
On 9 December 2021 at 3:55 PM China Standard Time (07:55 UTC), the crew of Shenzhou 13 conducted their first live "space lecture" broadcast. The "main classroom" was located in the China Science and Technology Museum in Beijing, with "branch classrooms" in Nanning, Wenchuan, Hong Kong, and Macau. During the lecture, part of which was led by Wang Yaping, the taikonauts explained what living in space was like, and performed scientific experiments on cell biology, the behavior of effervescent tablets in microgravity, and water surface tension. After the lesson, the taikonauts were given time to answer schoolchildren's questions from the classrooms.

On 23 March 2022 at 3:40 PM China Standard Time (07:40 UTC), the crew of Shenzhou 13 conducted a second live "space lecture" broadcast. The "main classroom" was once again in the China Science and Technology Museum in Beijing, with "branch classrooms" in Lhasa, Tibet; and Ürümqi, Xinjiang. The lecture followed a similar structure to the previous broadcast, with a science lesson followed by a question-and-answer session with the taikonauts.

==== Interaction with American students ====
On 10 April 2022, at 3:00 AM China Standard Time (9 April, 19:00 UTC), a special question-and-answer session between the crew of Shenzhou 13 and American students was held at the Chinese Embassy in the U.S. in Washington, D.C., hosted by Chinese Ambassador to the U.S. Qin Gang. During the event, a pre-recorded message from SpaceX CEO Elon Musk was also played, expressing his wishes for further international cooperation in space in the future.

==== Documentary ====
During their six-month stay aboard the Tiangong space station, the Shenzhou 13 crew used 8K-resolution cameras to document their work and daily lives. Their footage was incorporated into the documentary film Shenzhou 13 (Chinese: 窗外是蓝星; lit. 'Blue Planet Outside the Window'), directed by Zhu Yiran and produced by China Media Group, which was subsequently released in Chinese cinemas on 5 September 2025. The film primarily presents the footage from Wang Yaping's perspective. According to Zhu, downmass constraints of the Shenzhou return capsule meant that the crew brought back the footage on 40 1TB memory cards, leaving the two 8K cameras aboard the station.

=== Return ===
The Shenzhou 13 reentry module and its parachute exhibited at the National Museum of China, Beijing, in 2023.

Shenzhou 13 undocked from Tiangong on 15 April 2022 at 16:44 UTC, and landed nine hours later on 16 April at the Dongfeng landing site in the Gobi Desert in Inner Mongolia at 01:56 UTC.

== Crew ==
Position	Crew member
Commander	Zhai Zhigang, PLAAC; Second spaceflight
Operator	Wang Yaping, PLAAC; Second spaceflight
System Operator	Ye Guangfu, PLAAC; First spaceflight

Zhai Zhigang previously flew on Shenzhou 7. As the commander, he was responsible for completing the mission objectives, supervising mission operations and serving as the lead spacewalks.

Wang Yaping, the first woman to visit the Tiangong space station and the first Chinese woman to fly to space twice, previously flew on Shenzhou 10. She will hold a new responsibility, serving as the backup pilot and conducting mission specific duties.

Ye Guangfu joined the ESA CAVES program in 2016 before getting assigned to this mission. He is also responsible for conducting mission specific duties and performing on-board maintenance.
