= Liu Yang (taikonaut) =

Chinese taikonaut (born 1978)

- 刘洋
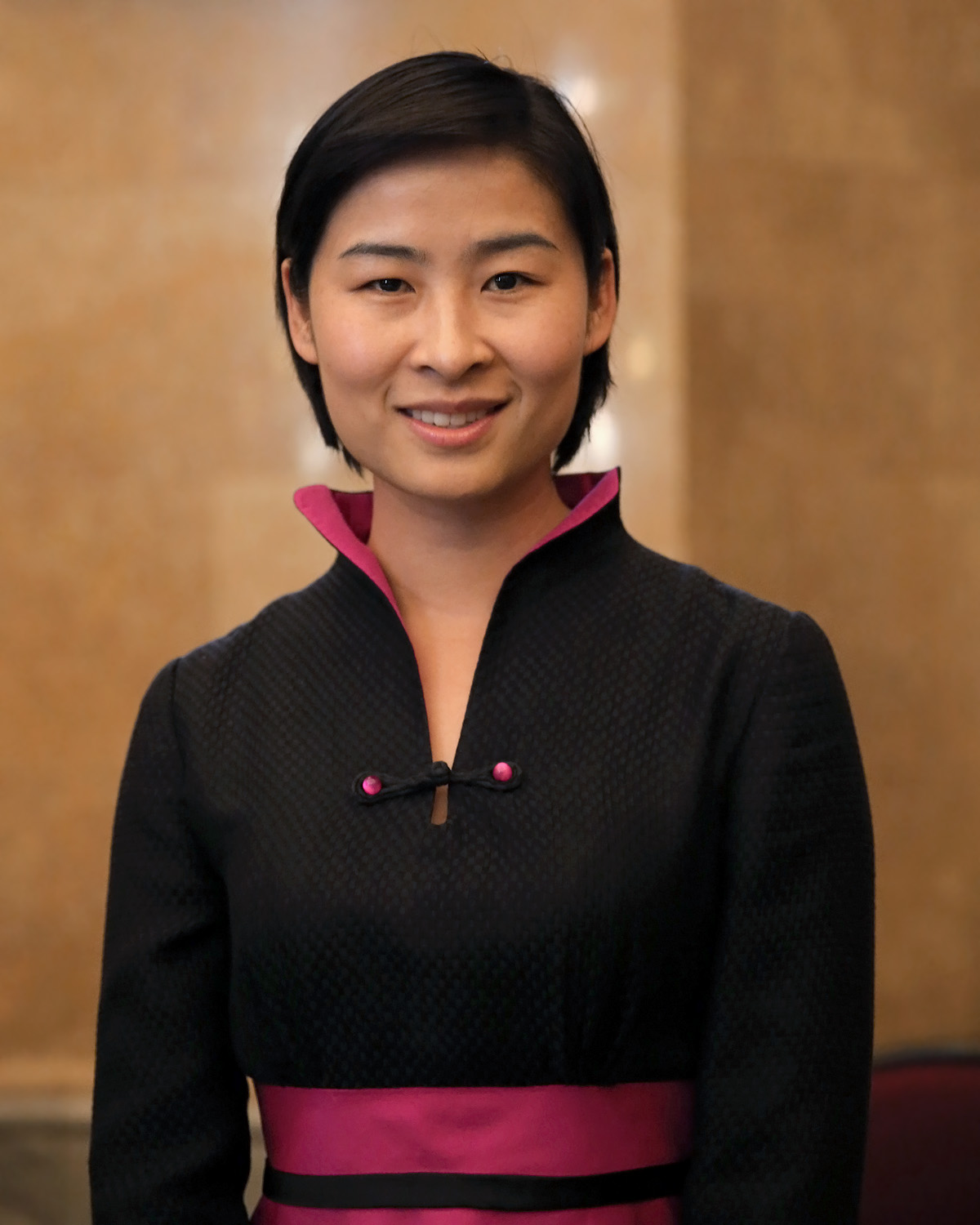
- Liu in 2013
- Born: October 6, 1978 (age 47); Zhengzhou, Henan, China
- Spouse: Zhang Hua
- Children: 2
- Space career

PLAAC astronaut
- Previous occupation: Military transport pilot, People's Liberation Army Air Force
- Status: Active
- Rank: Senior Colonel, People's Liberation Army Strategic Support Force
- Time in space: 195 days, 50 minutes
- Selection: Chinese Group 2 (2010)
- Total EVAs: 1
- Total EVA time: 6 hours, 7 minutes
- Missions: Shenzhou 9 Shenzhou 14

Liu Yang
- Traditional Chinese: 劉洋
- Simplified Chinese: 刘洋
Transcriptions
Standard Mandarin
- Hanyu Pinyin: Liú Yáng
- IPA: [ljǒʊ jǎŋ]

Liu Yang (Chinese: 刘洋; pinyin: Liú Yáng; born October 6, 1978) is a Chinese military transport pilot and taikonaut. On June 16, 2012, Yang became the first Chinese woman in space, as a crew member of Shenzhou 9.

== Biography ==
Liu Yang was born in Zhengzhou, Henan province in 1978, into a worker's family of Linzhou, Anyang origin. Her father Liu Shilin (刘士林) was an assistant engineer in the technical department of Zhengzhou First Food Machinery Factory, and her mother Niu Xiyun (牛喜云) was a worker in Zhengzhou Light Automobile Manufacturing Factory. She is the only child in her family. As a child, Liu aspired to become a lawyer or a bus conductor.

Liu Yang joined the PLA Air Force in 1997 and qualified as a pilot before becoming the deputy head of a flight unit, holding the PLAAF rank of major. She graduated from PLA Air Force Aviation University in Changchun. She is a veteran pilot with 1,680 hours of flying experience. After two years of astronaut training, Yang excelled in testing before being selected with another woman, Wang Yaping, as a candidate for the People's Liberation Army Astronaut Corps (PLAAC).

Liu Yang was selected for the crew of Shenzhou 9, the first crewed mission to the experimental Chinese space station Tiangong 1, along with Jing Haipeng — the first repeat Chinese space traveller — and Liu Wang. The mission was launched on June 16, 2012, 49 years to the day after the first female space traveller, cosmonaut Valentina Tereshkova, was launched. During Shenzhou 9's mission, Liu performed experiments in space medicine.

On June 5, 2022, Liu launched aboard Shenzhou 14 to the Tiangong space station for a mission of approximately 6 months, during which she assisted with the station's assembly and expansion. On September 1, 2022, Liu became the second Chinese woman to perform a spacewalk.

== Personal life ==
Liu Yang is married to Zhang Hua (张华), and the couple have a son and a daughter. Her first child's birth was announced in February 2015.

Liu Yang has been described as an eloquent speaker, an avid reader and also a lover of cooking.

== See also ==
- Women in space
  - Valentina Tereshkova
  - Sally Ride
  - Chinese women in space
    - Wang Yaping
- List of Chinese astronauts
- Chinese space programme
