= Cai Xuzhe =

Chinese taikonaut (born 1976)

- 蔡旭哲
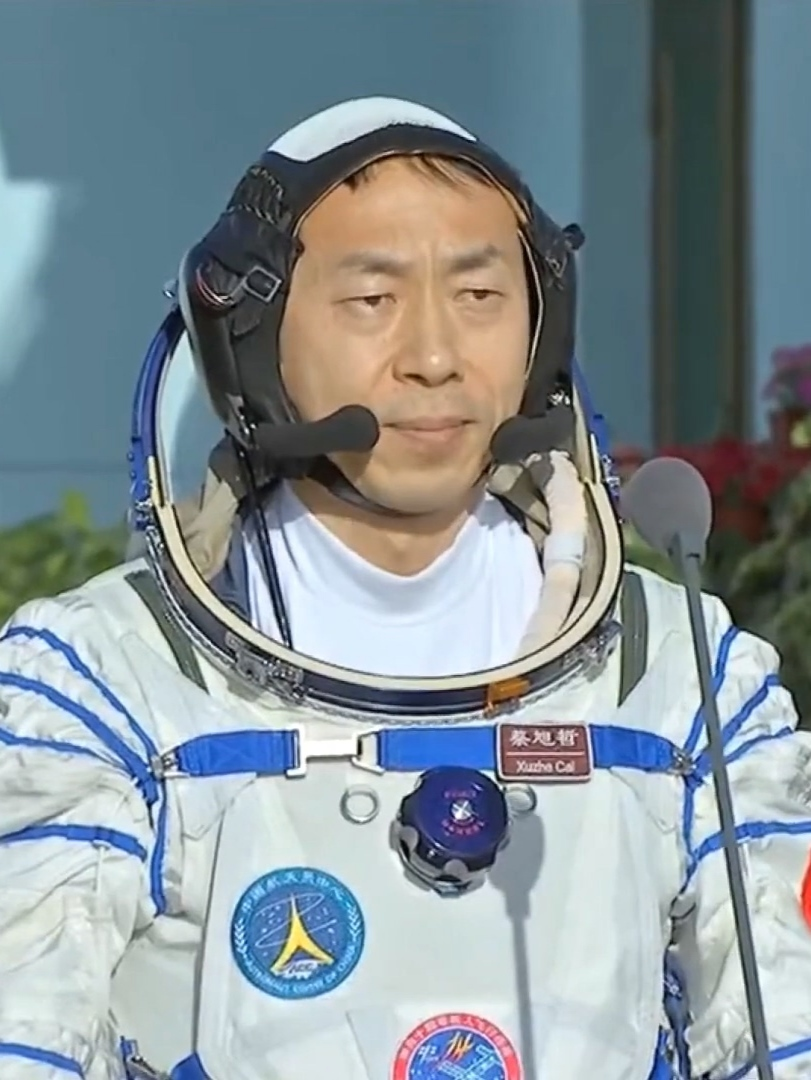
- Born: May 1976 (age 50); Shenzhou, Hebei, China
- Space career

PLAAC astronaut
- Previous occupation: People's Liberation Army Air Force pilot
- Status: Active
- Rank: Senior Colonel, People's Liberation Army Ground Force
- Time in space: 364 days, 18 hours and 7 minutes
- Selection: Chinese Group 2 (2010)
- Total EVAs: 5
- Total EVA time: 34 hours, 14 minutes
- Missions: Shenzhou 14; Shenzhou 19

Chinese name
- Simplified Chinese: 蔡旭哲
- Traditional Chinese: 蔡旭哲
Transcriptions
Standard Mandarin
- Hanyu Pinyin: Cài Xùzhé

Cai Xuzhe (Chinese: 蔡旭哲; born May 1976) is a Chinese People's Liberation Army Astronaut Corps (PLAAC) taikonaut selected as part of the Shenzhou program.

== Biography ==
Cai was born in Shenzhou, Hengshui, Hebei province in 1976. His grandparents come from a scholarly family, teaching in the downtown county and village, respectively, and were veteran party members before the founding of the People's Republic of China. His third uncle was a soldier. Cai graduated from the Baoding Branch of the Changchun Flight Academy of the Air Force. He served as a fighter pilot in the People's Liberation Army Air Force, and was subsequently selected to be an astronaut in 2010. His name was revealed as part of Group 2 in 2011.

He was on board the Tiangong space station as part of the Shenzhou 14 mission in 2022, spending 182 days in space. He completed two spacewalks on 17 September and 17 November both with Chen Dong.

He returned to Tiangong on 29 October 2024 as the commander of the Shenzhou 19 mission. Then, on 17 December 2024, during this mission's first EVA, he broke the record with Song Lingdong for the longest spacewalk in human history, of 9 hours and 6 minutes, with the assistance of the space station's robotic arms and ground-based scientific personnel, completed tasks such as the installation of space debris protection devices, inspection, and maintenance of external equipment and facilities. During this mission he completed three spacewalks, for a total of 5 over his career. After spending 6 months in space, he returned to Earth on 30 April 2025.

== Personal life ==
Cai married Wang Yanqing (王颜晴), who is a nurse in a PLA military hospital.

== See also ==
- List of Chinese astronauts
- Chinese space programme
