= Wang Yaping =

Chinese taikonaut (born 1980)

- 王亚平
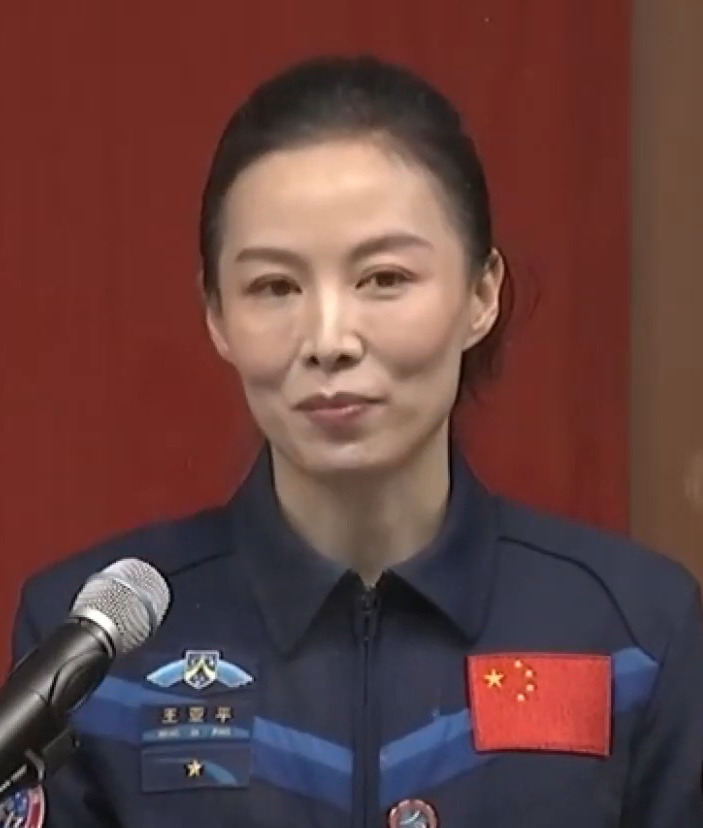
- Born: January 1980 (age 46); Yantai, Shandong, China
- Education: Changchun Flight College
- Spouse: Zhao Peng
- Children: 1
- Space career

PLAAC astronaut
- Previous occupation: Military transport pilot, People's Liberation Army Air Force
- Status: Active
- Rank: Senior colonel, People's Liberation Army Strategic Support Force
- Time in space: 197 days, 1 minute
- Selection: Chinese Group 2 (2010)
- Total EVAs: 1
- Total EVA time: 6 hours, 25 minutes
- Missions: Shenzhou 10; Shenzhou 13

Chinese name
- Traditional Chinese: 王亞平
- Simplified Chinese: 王亚平
Transcriptions
Standard Mandarin
- Hanyu Pinyin: Wáng Yàpíng
- IPA: [wǎŋ jâpʰǐŋ]

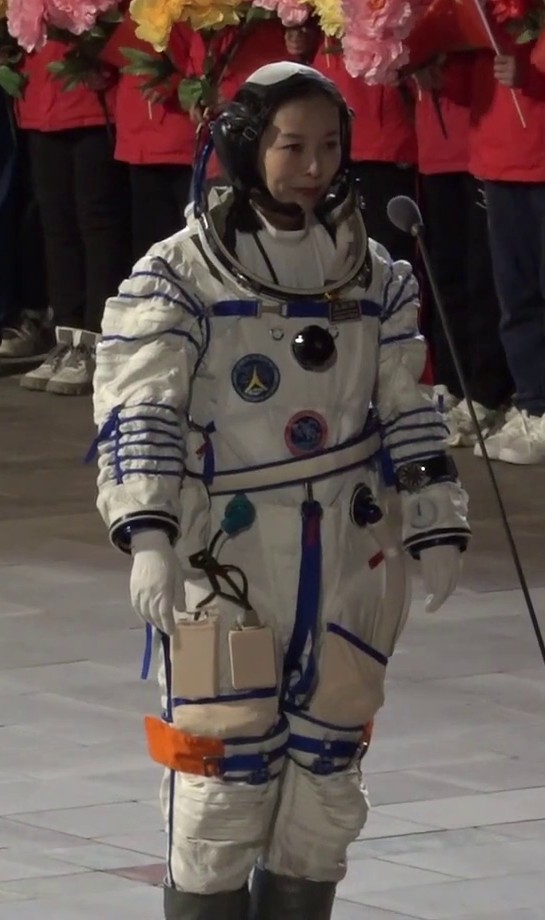
Wang at Shenzhou 13 launch ceremony in October 2021

Wang Yaping (Chinese: 王亚平; pinyin: Wáng Yàpíng; born January 1980) is a Chinese military transport pilot and taikonaut. Wang was the second female taikonaut selected to the People's Liberation Army Astronaut Corps, the second Chinese woman in space, and the first Chinese woman to perform a spacewalk.

In April 2022, she set a new record for longest stay in space by a female Chinese astronaut with a cumulative 197 days in space.

== Early life ==
Wang was born in the prefecture of Yantai, in Shandong province. Her mother and father are farmers, and she was reported to have two sisters.

In September 1991, she entered junior high school in Yantai, and in 1994 entered Yantai Yizhong High School, graduating in 1997. She was admitted to the Changchun Flight College of the People's Liberation Army Air Force.

== Air Force career ==
Wang joined the air force in August 1997. Wang was from the seventh batch of female military pilots in China, one of 37 members, and graduated from Aviation University and flight school in 2001 with the rank of First Lieutenant. As a pilot with the Air Force's transport aircraft crew in Wuhan, she has participated in tasks such as combat readiness exercises, the Wenchuan Earthquake relief effort, and cloud seeding and weather modification for the Beijing 2008 Olympic Games to eliminate clouds and reduce rain. After accumulating safe flights for 1600 hours, she was named Air Force Class II pilot. In May 2010 she officially became the second female astronaut of China. At that time Wang was a captain in the People's Liberation Army Air Force.

== Spaceflight career ==
She was a candidate for the space mission Shenzhou 9 in 2012. However, Liu Yang was selected over her for the historic mission of the first Chinese female space traveller. Wang was a member of the backup crew for SZ-9.

=== Shenzhou 10 ===
Wang became the second Chinese female spacefarer as a member of the Shenzhou 10 spaceship crew, which orbited the Earth in June 2013, and of the Tiangong-1 orbiting space station with which it docked. She was known as the "Goddess II". She was the first member of the crew announced, in April, while the remainder of the crew were announced in June. Wang Yaping was one of two women in space on the 50th anniversary of Vostok 6, the first spaceflight by a woman, Valentina Tereshkova. The other woman in space on 16 June 2013 was Karen Nyberg, an American astronaut aboard the International Space Station. While aboard Tiangong-1, Wang conducted scientific experiments and taught a physics lesson to Chinese students by live television broadcast. In 2018, she held the rank of Air Force Colonel, and had trained to fly four aircraft models.

In March 2018, Wang was elected for a five-year-term as a deputy to the National People's Congress.

=== Shenzhou 13 ===
In October 2021, it was announced that Wang was selected as one of the three crew members to fly on Shenzhou 13 to the Tiangong space station, marking her second spaceflight and the first time a Chinese woman would travel to space twice. She was to be the first female astronaut to board the Tiangong space station and to perform an extravehicular activity. The mission would be China's longest crewed space mission.

On 15 October 2021, the three Shenzhou 13 crewmembers arrived at the Tianhe space station module, hours after launch. On 7 November, the China Manned Space Agency announced that a spacewalk was underway and it was being performed by astronauts Zhai Zhigang, the Shenzhou 13 mission commander, and Wang Yaping, who was now China's first female spacewalker. EVA operations started at 6:21 p.m.. Wang exited from the node cabin of the Tianhe Core Module at 8:28 p.m.. Zhai and Wang completed their EVAs and returned to Tianhe by 1:16 a.m. on 8 November, the entire operation having lasted 6 hours and 25 minutes. Wang wore a new spacesuit, delivered to the station by the Tianzhou 3 cargo resupply craft in September. According to Chinese state media, this suit was optimized for her shorter height.

== Personal life ==
Wang is married to Zhao Peng, a PLAAF pilot. She has one daughter. She is studying for a doctoral degree in psychology at Peking University.

== See also ==
- List of Chinese astronauts
- Chinese space programme
- Women in space
  - List of female astronauts
  - Chinese women in space
    - Liu Yang (first)
