= Zhai Zhigang =

Chinese military officer and taikonaut (born 1966)

- 翟志刚
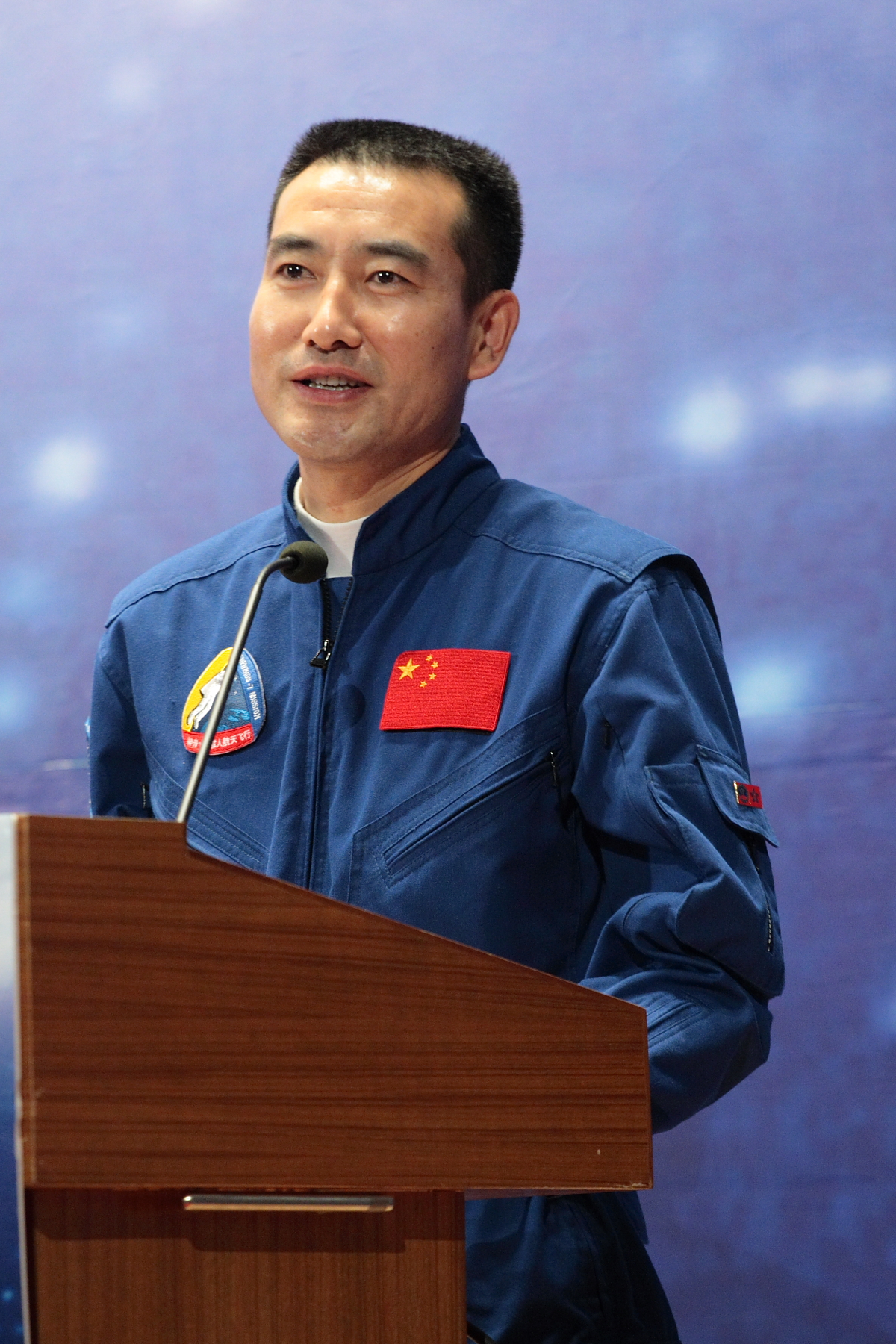
- Zhai in 2008
- Born: 11 October 1966 (age 59); Longjiang County, Heilongjiang, China
- Education: PLA Air Force Aviation University
- Space career

PLAAC astronaut
- Previous occupation: Fighter pilot, People's Liberation Army Air Force
- Status: Active
- Rank: Major General, People's Liberation Army Strategic Support Force
- Time in space: 185 days, 5 hours, 59 minutes
- Selection: Chinese Group 1 (1998)
- Total EVAs: 3
- Total EVA time: 12 hours, 58 minutes
- Missions: Shenzhou 7 Shenzhou 13

Chinese name
- Simplified Chinese: 翟志刚
- Traditional Chinese: 翟志剛
Transcriptions
Standard Mandarin
- Hanyu Pinyin: Zhái Zhìgāng

Zhai Zhigang (Chinese: 翟志刚; pinyin: Zhái Zhìgāng; born 11 October 1966) is a Chinese major general of the People's Liberation Army Strategic Support Force (PLASSF) in active service as a People's Liberation Army Astronaut Corps (PLAAC) taikonaut. During the Shenzhou 7 mission in 2008, he became the first Chinese citizen to carry out a spacewalk. He was a People's Liberation Army Air Force (PLAAF) fighter pilot before becoming an astronaut.

== Early life and education ==
Zhai was born in a rural village on 11 October 1966. He is the youngest of six children. He attended Longjiang County No. 2 High School. He studied at the PLA Air Force Aviation University to be a fighter pilot and then as a squadron leader.

== Air Force career ==
Zhai achieved the ranks of lieutenant colonel and pilot trainer in the PLAAF. He has logged over 1000 hours of flight time.

== Astronaut Corps career ==
In 1996, Zhai was selected as a candidate for the taikonaut program and was appointed to be part of the first group of fourteen in 1998. He was one of three members of the final group to train for the Shenzhou 5 flight. Yang Liwei was picked for the flight, with Zhai Zhigang ranked second ahead of Nie Haisheng. Zhai was one of the six taikonauts in the final training for Shenzhou 6. Ta Kung Pao had reported that Zhai Zhigang and Nie Haisheng were the leading pair after having been in the final group of three for Shenzhou 5. However, Zhai was paired with Wu Jie during training. Fei Junlong and Nie Haisheng flew the flight.

=== Shenzhou 7 ===
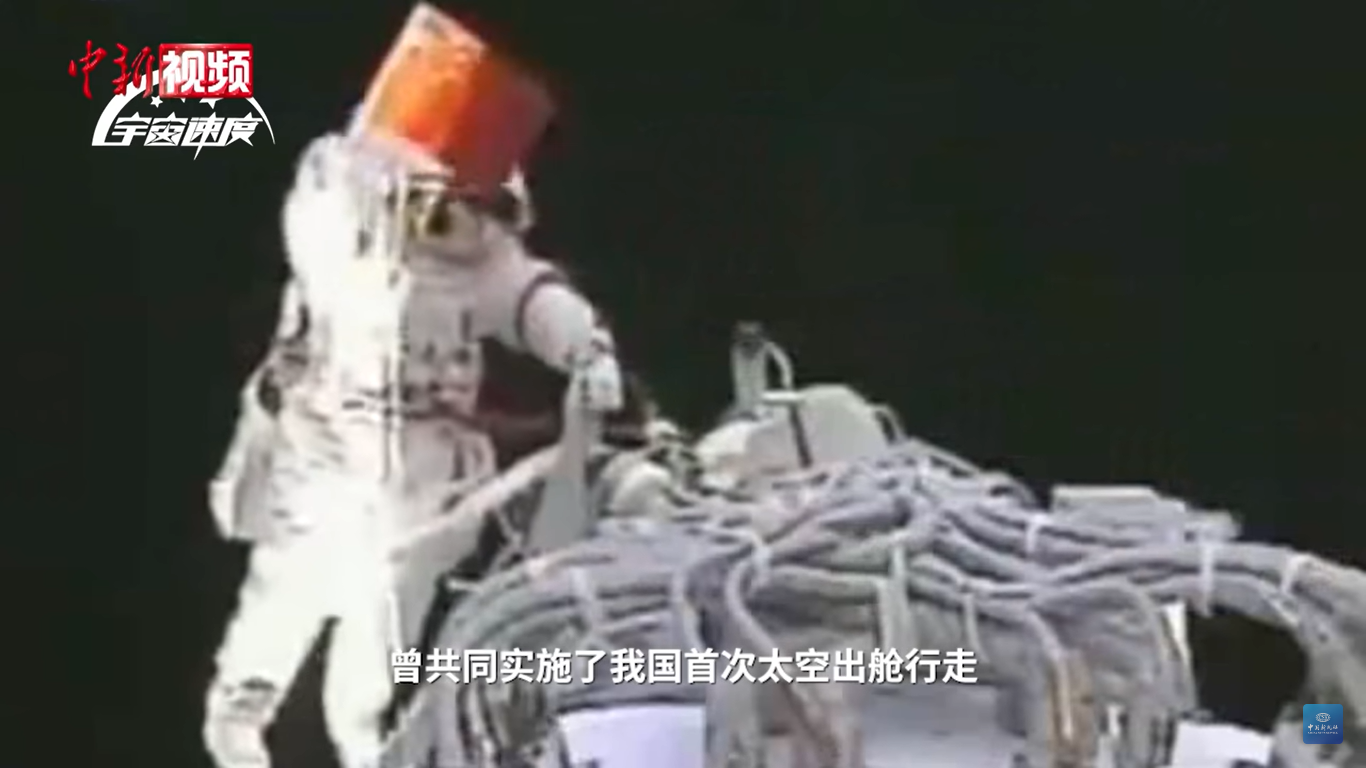
Zhai performing an EVA during the Shenzhou 7 mission.

Zhai, Liu Boming and Jing Haipeng were selected as the primary crew on Shenzhou 7, with Zhai as commander, on 17 September 2008. On 25 September 2008, at 21:10 CST, they launched as the first three-person crew for China, China's third human spaceflight. On 27 September 2008, Zhai became the first Chinese astronaut to perform a spacewalk, completely outside the craft. Fellow crew member Liu Boming stood by at the airlock and could be seen straddling the portal. Zhai successfully completed his spacewalk at 18:25 CST. Zhai wore the Chinese developed Feitian space suit, while Liu wore the Russian derived Orlan-M space suit.

=== Shenzhou 13 ===
Zhai was selected as commander to fly on the Shenzhou 13 alongside Wang Yaping and Ye Guangfu as his second spaceflight and first to the Tiangong space station. On 7 November 2021, Zhai carried out his second spacewalk alongside Wang who became China's first woman to perform a spacewalk. On 26 December 2021, Zhai carried out his third spacewalk with Ye.

== Personal life ==
Zhai's favourite pastimes are calligraphy, dance and gadgetry. He is married to Zhang Shujing and has one son.

== See also ==
- List of Chinese astronauts
- Chinese space programme
