= Shenzhou 19 =

2024 Chinese crewed spaceflight to the Tiangong space station

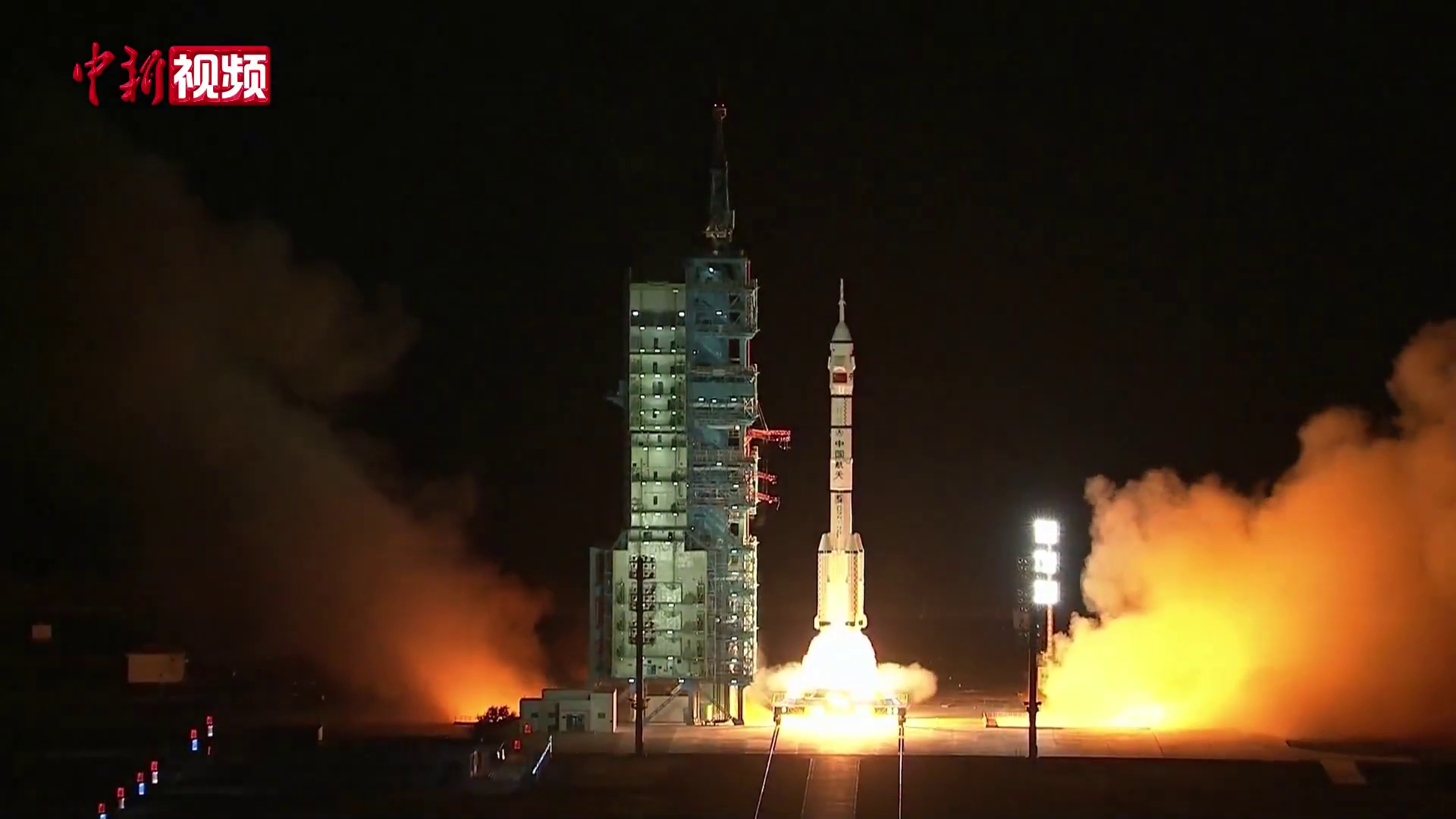
- Liftoff of Shenzhou 19.
- Mission type: Tiangong space station crew transport
- Operator: China Manned Space Agency
- COSPAR ID: 2024-194A
- SATCAT no.: 61683
- Mission duration: 182 days, 8 hours, 40 minutes

Spacecraft properties
- Spacecraft type: Shenzhou
- Manufacturer: China Aerospace Science and Technology Corporation

Crew
- Crew size: 3
- Members: Cai Xuzhe; Song Lingdong; Wang Haoze
- EVAs: 3
- EVA duration: 24 hours, 28 minutes

Start of mission
- Launch date: 29 October 2024, 20:27:34 UTC (30 October, 04:27:34 CST)
- Rocket: Long March 2F/G (Y19)
- Launch site: Jiuquan, LA-4/SLS-1
- Contractor: China Academy of Launch Vehicle Technology

End of mission
- Landing date: 30 April 2025, 05:08:12 UTC
- Landing site: Inner Mongolia (41°12′50″N 101°04′09″E)

Orbital parameters
- Reference system: Geocentric orbit
- Regime: Low Earth orbit
- Altitude: 389 km (242 mi)
- Inclination: 41.47°

Docking with Tiangong space station
- Docking port: Tianhe forward
- Docking date: 30 October 2024, 03:00 UTC
- Undocking date: 29 April 2025, 20:00 UTC
- Time docked: 181 days, 17 hours
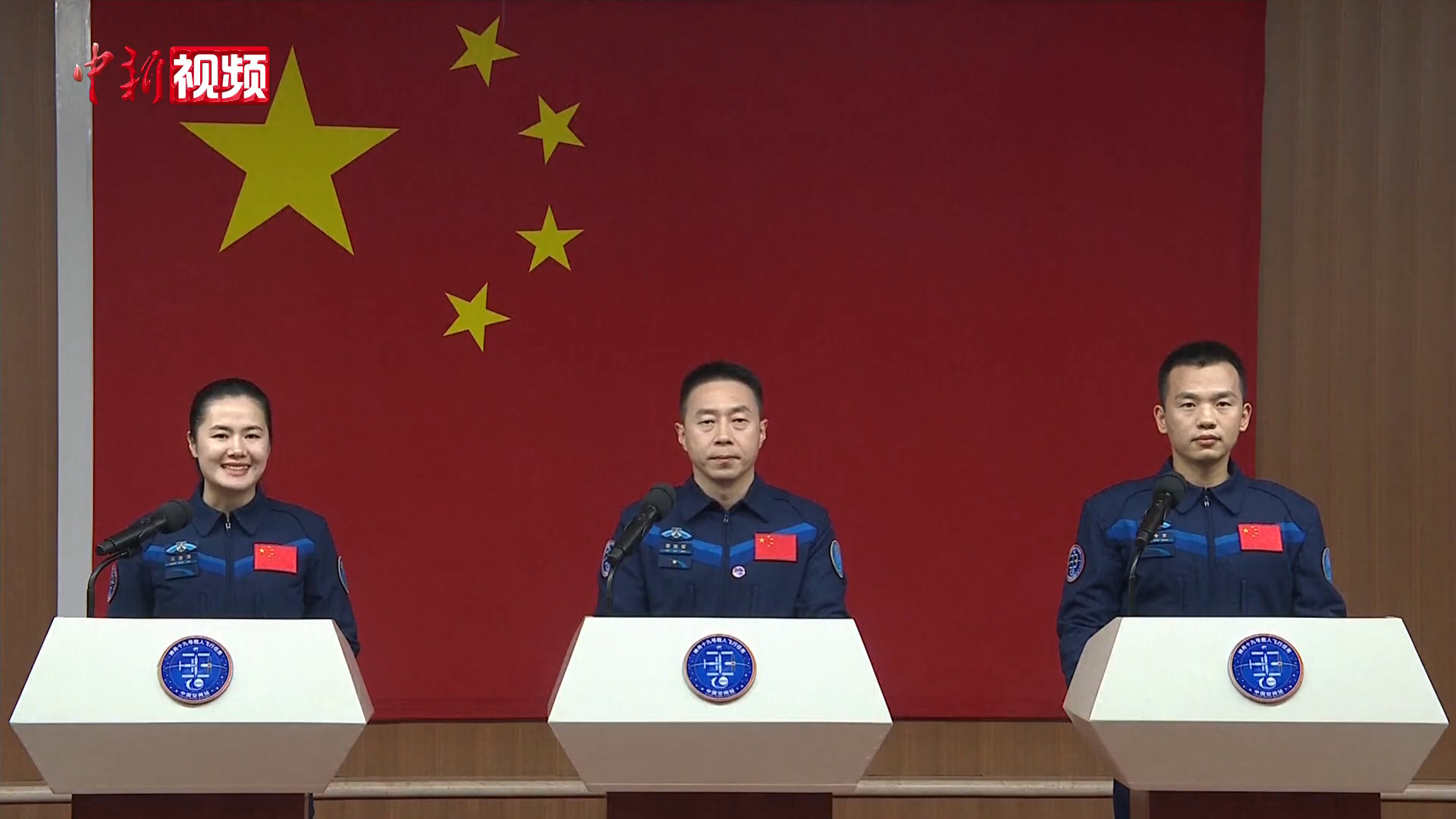
- Mission insignia From left: Wang Haoze, Cai Xuzhe and Song Lingdong Shenzhou program

Shenzhou 19 (simplified Chinese: 神舟十九号; traditional Chinese: 神舟十九號; pinyin: Shénzhōu shíjiǔ hào) was a Chinese spaceflight to the Tiangong space station that was launched on 29 October 2024 and returned to Earth on 30 April 2025. It carried three crew members on board a Shenzhou spacecraft. The mission was the 14th crewed Chinese spaceflight and the 19th flight overall of the Shenzhou program.

== Background ==
Shenzhou 19 launched on 29 October 2024, prior to the end of the previous mission, Shenzhou 18. It was the eighth flight to the Tiangong space station and lasted approximately 6 months, departing after the arrival of the Shenzhou 20 crew on 24 April 2025.

== Mission ==
The mission launched from Jiuquan Satellite Launch Center on board a Long March 2F rocket. The Shenzhou spacecraft docked with the forward docking port on the Tianhe core module of the station, where the crew entered and taken over operations from the departing crew of Shenzhou 18, who returned to Earth on 4 November. The crew are carrying out experiments to aid China's goal of landing a crewed mission on the moon by 2030.

The mission was scheduled to return to Earth on April 29, 2025, but was delayed by one day due to high winds at the planned landing site. The crew landed safely on the following day, April 30, at a new site on the eastern side of the Dongfeng landing area in Inner Mongolia.

== Crew ==
| Position | Crew |
|---|---|
| Commander | Cai Xuzhe, CMSA; Second spaceflight |
| Operator | Song Lingdong, CMSA; First spaceflight |
| Flight Engineer | Wang Haoze, CMSA; First spaceflight |

Cai Xuzhe, 48, is a veteran astronaut who flew previously on the Shenzhou 14 mission in 2022. He is now tasked with the responsibility of the whole mission. Song and Wang, both 34 years old and youngest Chinese astronauts, embarked on their first spaceflight, Song Lingdong is a former air force pilot responsible for completing mission objectives. Wang Haoze the third female taikonaut, and first female flight engineer from China, to space. She is in charge of the care of the space station's key systems.

== Spacewalks ==
=== New record for the longest space walk ===
On 17 December 2024, during the crew's first spacewalk since arriving at the space station, Cai Xuzhe set a new record with Song Lingdong for the longest spacewalk, of 9 hours and 6 minutes, completing tasks such as the installation of space debris protection devices, inspection, and maintenance of external equipment and facilities. Song also became the youngest Chinese astronaut, born after the 1990s, to have embarked on an EVA.

On 20 January 2025, the crew conducted their second spacewalk, with commander Cai Xuzhe and Song Lingdong as the participants, lasting 8 hours and 17 minutes. They completed the installation of more space debris shield devices and checking the condition of extravehicular equipment.

On 21 March 2025, the crew conducted their third spacewalk, with commander Cai Xuzhe and Song Lingdong as the participants, lasting 7 hours and 5 minutes. They completed the installation of more space debris shield devices and checking the condition of extravehicular equipment.
