= Shenzhou 10 =

2013 Chinese crewed spaceflight to Tiangong-1

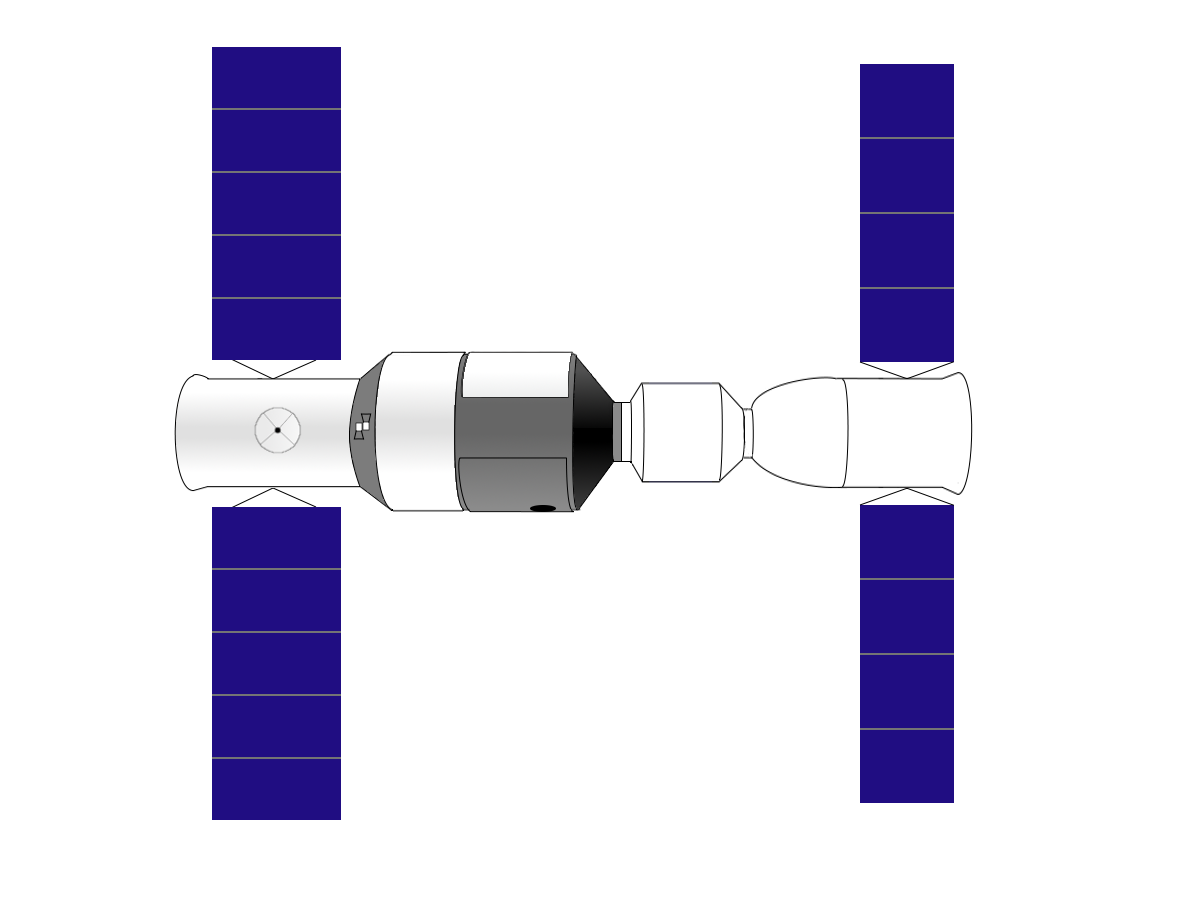
- Diagram of Shenzhou 10 (right) docked with Tiangong-1 (left)
- Mission type: Tiangong-1 crew transport
- COSPAR ID: 2013-029A
- SATCAT no.: 39179
- Mission duration: 14 days, 14 hours, 29 minutes

Spacecraft properties
- Spacecraft type: Shenzhou
- Manufacturer: CASC

Crew
- Crew size: 3
- Members: Nie Haisheng; Zhang Xiaoguang; Wang Yaping

Start of mission
- Launch date: 11 June 2013, 09:38:02 UTC
- Rocket: Long March 2F
- Launch site: Jiuquan LA-4/SLS

End of mission
- Landing date: 26 June 2013, 00:07 UTC
- Landing site: Inner Mongolia

Orbital parameters
- Reference system: Geocentric
- Regime: Low Earth
- Perigee altitude: 262 kilometres (163 mi)
- Apogee altitude: 315 kilometres (196 mi)
- Inclination: 42.7 degrees
- Period: 90.28 minutes
- Epoch: 12 June 2013

Docking with Tiangong-1
- Docking date: 13 June 2013, 05:11 UTC
- Undocking date: 25 June 2013
- Time docked: 12 days
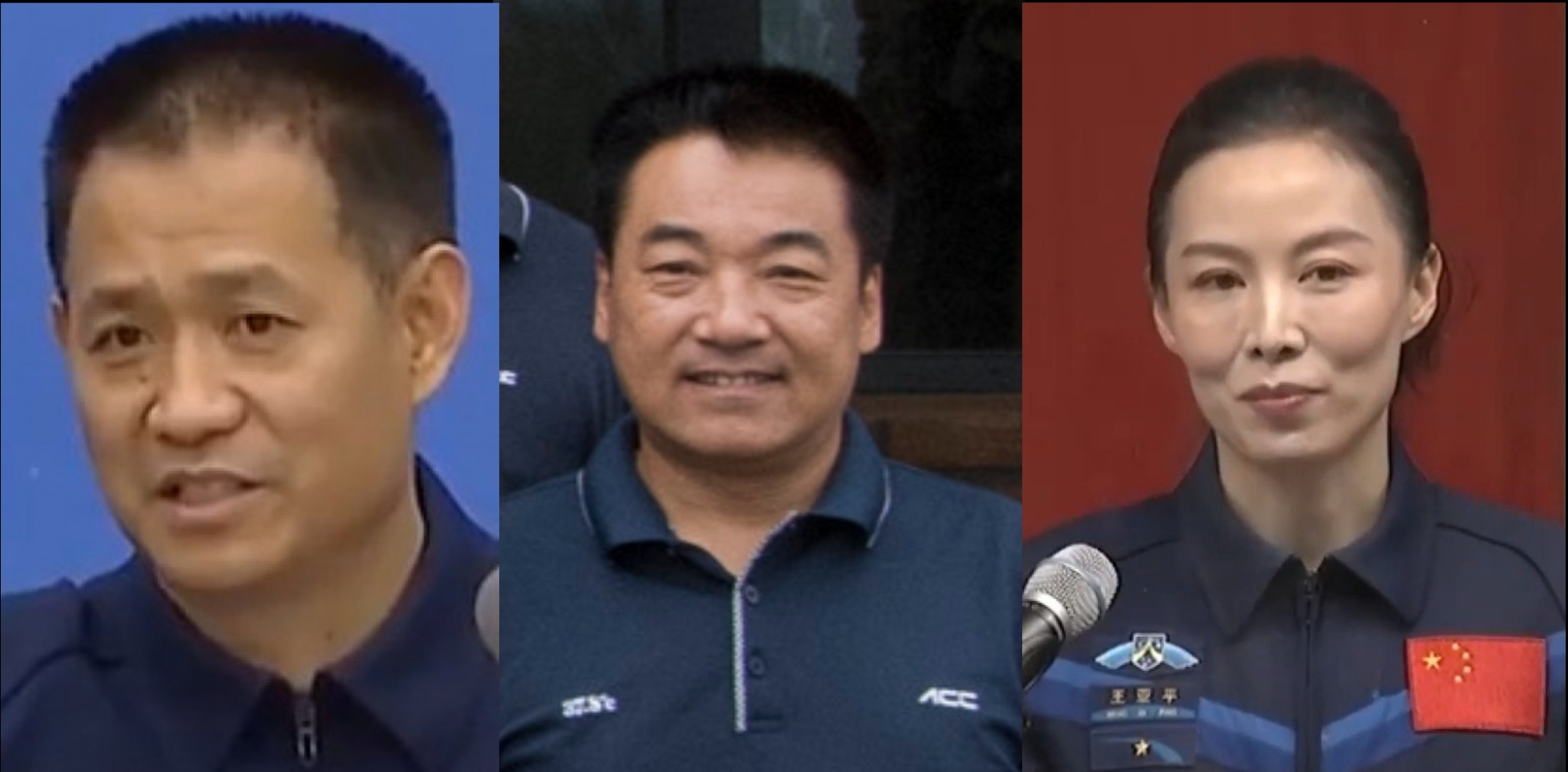
- (L-R) Nie, Zhang and Wang Shenzhou program

Shenzhou 10 (simplified Chinese: 神舟十号; traditional Chinese: 神舟十號; pinyin: Shénzhōu shí hào) was a crewed spaceflight of China's Shenzhou program that was launched on 11 June 2013. It was China's fifth crewed space mission. The mission had a crew of three astronauts: Nie Haisheng, who was mission commander and previously flew on Shenzhou 6; Zhang Xiaoguang, a former PLAAF squadron commander who conducted the rendezvous and docking; and Wang Yaping, the second Chinese female astronaut. The Shenzhou spacecraft docked with the Tiangong-1 trial space laboratory module on 13 June, and the astronauts performed physical, technological, and scientific experiments while on board. Shenzhou 10 was the 2nd and final expedition and mission to Tiangong-1 in this portion of the Tiangong program. On 26 June 2013, after a series of successful docking tests, Shenzhou 10 returned to Earth.

== Preparations ==
Prior to the reboost of Tiangong-1 on 30 August 2012, it was projected that a launch window would open between late November and December 2012, when Tiangong-1's orbit had decayed to the level of a Shenzhou's standard orbit. With the reboost, it was expected that the orbital decay would bring Tiangong-1 within reach again in late January, so the Shenzhou 10 mission was anticipated for late January or February 2013. At the 18th National Congress of the Chinese Communist Party, a space official stated that Shenzhou 10 was planned for the period between June and August 2013.

It is the fifth crewed mission of the Shenzhou program, coming ten years after the original, Shenzhou 5.

From 2012 November onwards, a feed of information ensued, including a desire for the crew to have a female member and that the actual launch date would be at the beginning of the June–August period. Knowledge of the conditions that China sets for launch windows for its piloted spacecraft allowed the likely launch date to be calculated as somewhere in the period between 7 and 13 June.

Xinhua News Agency published an item from the Beijing Times that summed up the aims of the mission, and included the information that Wang Yaping was the only female trainee in the group of astronaut candidates. Wang Yaping was announced to be one of the crew in April 2013, the only member of the crew revealed until June, when the rest of the crew was revealed. The crew of Shenzhou 10 previously served as the backup crew to Shenzhou 9. With Nie Haisheng's elevation to general, this marked the first instance that China would launch a flag officer into space, after they had become a general officer.

== Launch and docking ==
Shenzhou 10 was launched on 11 June 2013, at 09:38 UTC (17:38 local time). A Long March 2F carrier rocket was used to perform the launch, flying from Pad 1 of the South Launch Site at the Jiuquan Satellite Launch Center in Inner Mongolia. The spacecraft successfully reached low Earth orbit before the rocket detached. With a duration of 15 days, Shenzhou 10 was China's longest human spaceflight mission to date, surpassing the previous record holder, Shenzhou 9 by two days. CPC General Secretary, Chinese President Xi Jinping was present for both the departure ceremony, and the launch itself.

The spacecraft docked with Tiangong-1 at 05:11 UTC on 13 June. The crew opened the hatch three hours later and entered the laboratory module.

== Objectives ==
Once docked at Tiangong-1, the three crew members conducted space medicine and technological experiments and other scientific endeavours. Nie Haisheng was mission commander, overseeing docking procedures, and pilot Zhang Xiaoguang was in charge of rendezvous and docking. Wang Yaping conducted the scientific experiments and taught a physics lesson to Chinese students by live television broadcast. On 23 June, Shenzhou 10 undocked from the station and performed a manual re-docking.

== Landing ==
The reentry module of Shenzhou 10, displayed at the Mao Zedong Memorial Museum in Shaoshan.

Shenzhou 10 returned to Earth on Wednesday, 26 June 2013 00:07 UTC. Total mission duration was 14 days 14 hours and 29 minutes.

== Crew ==
Position	Crew member
Commander	Nie Haisheng (China); Second spaceflight
Operator	Zhang Xiaoguang (China); First spaceflight
Laboratory Assistant	Wang Yaping (China); First spaceflight

While in orbit, Wang Yaping was one of only two women in space on 16 June 2013, the 50th anniversary of Vostok 6, the first space flight by a woman, Valentina Tereshkova. The other woman in space that day was Karen Nyberg on board the International Space Station.

== See also ==
- Chinese space program
  - Chinese women in space
- Jiuquan Satellite Launch Center
- Long March 2F
- Tiangong program
