= People's Liberation Army Astronaut Corps =

Unit of the Chinese military responsible for the training of astronauts

- Emblem of the People's Liberation Army
- Active: 1998; 28 years ago
- Country: China
- Allegiance: Chinese Communist Party
- Branch: People's Liberation Army Aerospace Force
- Part of: People's Liberation Army

The People's Liberation Army Astronaut Corps (PLAAC; Chinese: 中国人民解放军航天员大队), also known as the Chinese Astronaut Corps (Chinese: 中国航天员大队), is a deputy-corps grade unit of the People's Liberation Army Aerospace Force (PLAASF) based in Beijing; it is responsible for the selection and training of the astronaut corps for Project 921, the Chinese manned space program.

== History ==
In October 1992, a Commission for Science, Technology and Industry for National Defense-PLA Air Force joint task force started the preliminary selection for astronauts; 1,506 pilots were identified and twelve were chosen as candidates. The Astronaut Corps was established on January 5, 1998 and the twelve along with two PLAAF trainees sent to Yuri Gagarin Cosmonaut Training Center in 1996 forms Chinese Group 1.

Seven pilots entered the Astronaut Corps in May 2010 as Group 2.

In 2014, Group 1 astronauts Wu Jie, Li Qinglong, Chen Quan, Zhao Chuandong, and Pan Zhanchun retired from the Astronaut Corps due to age; none of them had flown in a mission.

The Astronaut Corps was part of the General Armaments Department until GAD was disbanded in January 2016. As part of the 2015 military reform, it became part of the Strategic Support Force.

In January and March 2018, China Manned Space Agency vice director, astronaut Yang Liwei stated that Group 3 selection was expected to begin in 2018 and would include engineers and mission specialists. Yang also stated that Group 3 would include civilians from industry and research institutions.

== See also ==
- Other astronaut corps:
  - Canadian Astronaut Corps
  - European Astronaut Corps
  - NASA Astronaut Corps (United States)
  - Indian Astronaut Corps (India)
  - JAXA Astronaut Corps (Japan)
  - Roscosmos Cosmonaut Corps (Russia)
- List of Chinese astronauts
- List of astronauts by selection
- Human spaceflight
- History of spaceflight
