= List of human spaceflights in Tiangong Program =

This is a list of human spaceflights in Tiangong program.

== Past ==
Flight	Mission	Crew	Crew photo	Crew patch	Mission Start	Mission End	Notes
Tiangong-1
1	Shenzhou 9	(China) Jing Haipeng (China) Liu Wang (China) Liu Yang			Launch: 16 June 2012	29 June 2012	Deliver 3 astronauts to the Tiangong-1; first crewed mission to Tiangong-1.
2	Shenzhou 10	(China) Nie Haisheng (China) Zhang Xiaoguang (China) Wang Yaping			Launch: 11 June 2013	26 June 2013	Deliver 3 astronauts to the Tiangong-1; last crewed mission to Tiangong-1.
Tiangong-2
3	Shenzhou 11	(China) Jing Haipeng (China) Chen Dong			Launch: 16 October 2016	18 November 2016	Deliver 2 astronauts to the Tiangong-2; first and only crewed mission to Tiangong-2.
Tiangong Space Station
4	Shenzhou 12	(China) Nie Haisheng (China) Liu Boming (China) Tang Hongbo			Launch: 17 June 2021	17 September 2021	Deliver 3 astronauts to the Tiangong space station; first crewed mission to Tiangong space station.
5	Shenzhou 13	(China) Zhai Zhigang (China) Wang Yaping (China) Ye Guangfu			Launch: 15 October 2021	16 April 2022	Deliver 3 astronauts to the Tiangong space station; second crewed mission to Tiangong space station.
6	Shenzhou 14	(China) Chen Dong (China) Liu Yang (China) Cai Xuzhe			Launch: 5 June 2022	4 December 2022	Deliver 3 astronauts to the Tiangong space station; third crewed mission to Tiangong space station. Beginning of continuous crew inhabitation on Tiangong.
7	Shenzhou 15	(China) Fei Junlong (China) Deng Qingming (China) Zhang Lu			Launch: 29 November 2022	3 June 2023	Deliver 3 astronauts to the Tiangong space station; fourth crewed mission to Tiangong. Beginning of regular crew rotation in the Tiangong space station.
8	Shenzhou 16	(China) Jing Haipeng (China) Zhu Yangzhu (China) Gui Haichao			30 May 2023	30 October 2023	Delivered 3 taikonauts to the Tiangong space station; fifth crewed mission to Tiangong.
9	Shenzhou 17	(China) Tang Hongbo (China) Tang Shengjie (China) Jiang Xinlin			26 October 2023	30 April 2024	Delivered 3 taikonauts to the Tiangong space station; sixth crewed mission to Tiangong.
10	Shenzhou 18	(China) Ye Guangfu (China) Li Cong (China) Li Guangsu			25 April 2024	3 November 2024	Delivered 3 taikonauts to the Tiangong space station; seventh crewed mission to Tiangong.
11	Shenzhou 19	(China) Cai Xuzhe (China) Song Lingdong (China) Wang Haoze			29 October 2024	29 April 2025	To deliver three taikonauts to the Tiangong space station; eighth crewed mission to Tiangong.

== Ongoing ==
Flight	Mission	Crew	Crew photo	Crew patch	Mission Start	Mission End	Notes
Tiangong Space Station
12	Shenzhou 20	(China) Chen Dong (China) Chen Zhongrui (China) Wang Jie			24 April 2025		Deliver 3 astronauts to the Tiangong space station; ninth crewed mission to the Tiangong space station. Originally planned to return November 5th, this was delayed because of a potential space debris impact and will now occur on Shenzhou 21.
13	Shenzhou 21	(China) Zhang Lu (China) Wu Fei (China) Zhang Hongzhang			31 October 2025		Originally planned to return on Shenzhou-21 but will now return on Shenzhou-22 that will be launched uncrewed. Instead, Shenzhou-20 crew will return on Shenzhou-21 due to Shenzhou-20's inability to return the crew, following debris impact.

== Future ==
Flight	Mission	Crew	Crew photo	Crew patch	Mission Start	Mission End	Notes
Tiangong Space Station
14	Shenzhou 22	(China) TBA (China) TBA (China) TBA			Planned: November 2025		Deliver 3 astronauts to the Tiangong space station; tenth crewed mission to the Tiangong space station.
