= List of Tiangong space station expeditions =

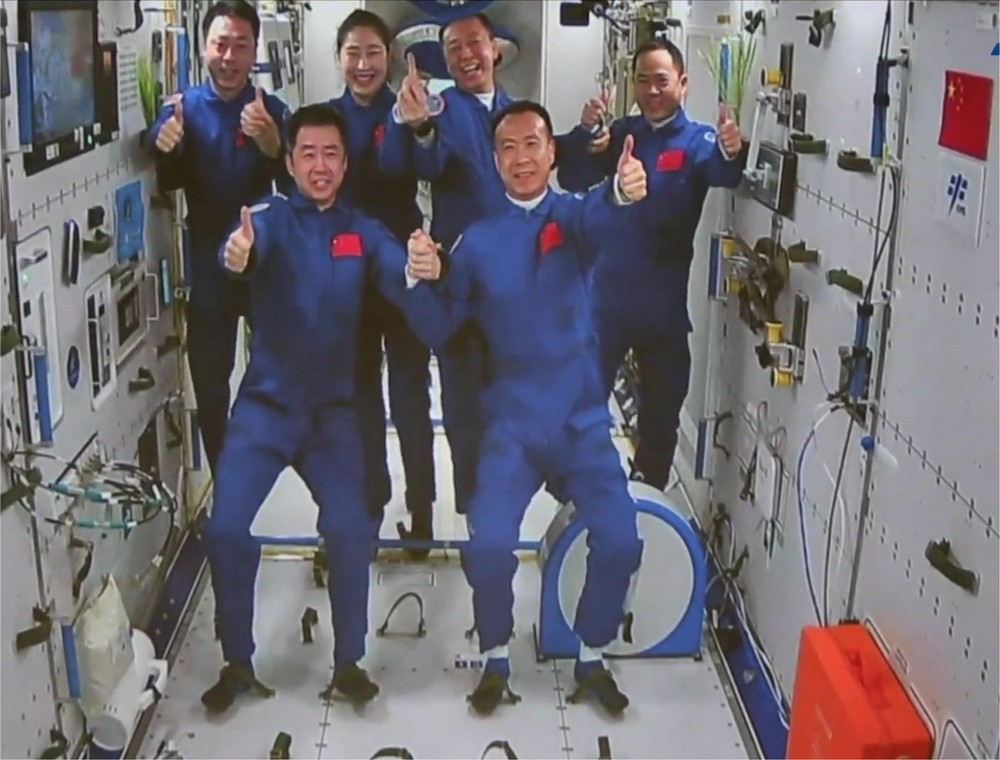
Two crews aboard Tiangong during the first handover, 30 November 2022

This is a chronological list of long-duration expeditions to the Tiangong space station, a space station operated by China in low Earth orbit since 2021. An expedition to Tiangong refers to the crew that is occupying the space station and using it for research and testing. These expeditions can last up to six months and typically include three crewmembers. Starting with the end of third expedition, which overlapped with the start of the fourth expedition, crews have had a "handover" period so that the station remains continuously inhabited.

In the lists below, these expeditions are numbered starting from one and sequentially increased with each expedition. Tiangong commanders are listed in bold. "Duration" is the period of time between the crew's arrival and departure from Tiangong.

== Completed expeditions ==
Exp.	Crew	Arrival (UTC)	Arrival flight	Departure (UTC)	Departure flight	Duration	Ref.
1	**Nie Haisheng**; Liu Boming; Tang Hongbo	17 June 2021, 07:54	Shenzhou 12	16 September 2021, 00:56	Shenzhou 12	90 days	
station uncrewed: 16 September–15 October 2021							
2	**Zhai Zhigang**; Ye Guangfu; Wang Yaping	15 October 2021, 22:56	Shenzhou 13	15 April 2022, 16:44	Shenzhou 13	181 days	
station uncrewed: 15 April–15 June 2022							
3	**Chen Dong**; Liu Yang; Cai Xuzhe	5 June 2022, 09:42	Shenzhou 14	4 December 2022, 03:01	Shenzhou 14	181 days	
4	**Fei Junlong**; Deng Qingming; Zhang Lu	29 November 2022, 21:42	Shenzhou 15	3 June 2023, 13:29	Shenzhou 15	185 days	
5	**Jing Haipeng**; Zhu Yangzhu; Gui Haichao	30 May 2023, 08:29	Shenzhou 16	30 October 2023, 12:37	Shenzhou 16	153 days	
6	**Tang Hongbo**; Tang Shengjie; Jiang Xinlin	26 October 2023, 09:46	Shenzhou 17	30 April 2024, 00:43	Shenzhou 17	186 days	
7	**Ye Guangfu**; Li Cong; Li Guangsu	25 April 2024, 19:32	Shenzhou 18	3 November 2024, 08:12	Shenzhou 18	191 days	
8	**Cai Xuzhe**; Song Lingdong; Wang Haoze	30 October 2024, 03:00	Shenzhou 19	29 April 2025, 20:00	Shenzhou 19	181 days	
9	**Chen Dong**; Chen Zhongrui; Wang Jie	24 April 2025, 15:49	Shenzhou 20	14 November 2025, 03:14	Shenzhou 21	203 days	
10	**Zhang Lu**; Wu Fei; Zhang Hongzhang	31 October 2025, 19:22	Shenzhou 21	29 May 2026, 12:11	Shenzhou 22	209 days	

== Current expedition ==
Exp.	Crew	Arrival (UTC)	Arrival flight	Departure (UTC)	Departure flight	Duration	Ref.
11	**Zhu Yangzhu**; Zhang Zhiyuan; Lai Ka-ying	24 May 2026, 18:45	Shenzhou 23	30 November 2026 (planned)	Shenzhou 23	179 days (in progress)	

== See also ==
- List of human spaceflights in Tiangong Program
- List of Mir Expeditions
- List of International Space Station expeditions
- List of visiting expeditions to the International Space Station
- List of ESA space expeditions
