= List of spacewalks since 2025 =

This list contains all spacewalks performed since the beginning of 2025 where an astronaut has fully, or partially left the spacecraft.

Since 1981, NASA has measured spacewalk duration from when the suits went to internal power until the start of airlock re-pressurization. Roscosmos and China have always used the time from hatch opening to hatch closure. These charts typically follow the agency's measurements of spacewalk duration, because those figures tend to be the most readily available, as they are most often provided by the agency.

== 2025–2029 spacewalks ==
Spacewalk beginning and ending times are given in Coordinated Universal Time (UTC).

=== 2025 spacewalks ===
#	Start date/time	Duration	End time	Spacecraft	Crew	Remarks
480	16 January; 13:01	6 hours	19:01	Expedition 72; ISS Quest	(United States) Nick Hague; (United States) Sunita Williams	Hague and Williams ventured outside and replaced the Rate Gyro Assembly Gyroscope 2 on the S0 Truss, replaced the retro reflectors on IDA 3, installed shields on NICER to patch holes in the light shades, relocated the C2V2 cables out of the way so the astronauts and Canadarm 2 could access the worksite, tested a tool on the AMS jumpers, and photographed the AMS jumpers so they can be de-mated on a future spacewalk. As part of a get-ahead task, they inspected an ammonia vent line on Unity and inspected a foot restraint located near the Z1 Radio Antenna. This spacewalk was originally supposed to be performed by Andreas Mogensen and Loral O'Hara during Expedition 70, but it was delayed indefinitely due to a radiator leak on Nauka.
481	20 January; 08:55	8 hours, 17 minutes	17:12	Shenzhou 19; TSS Wentian	(China) Cai Xuzhe; (China) Song Lingdong	Tasks included installation of space debris protection devices and inspections of the exterior of the TSS.
482	30 January; 12:43	5 hours, 26 minutes	18:09	Expedition 72; ISS Quest	(United States) Sunita Williams; (United States) Barry Wilmore	Wilmore and Williams successfully removed a faulty radio communications unit, although the time needed for this meant that other tasks that were scheduled for the spacewalk weren't accomplished. Williams broke the record for the woman to have spent the most on EVA, with a total of 62 hours and 6 minutes, and now ranks fourth amongst all spacewalkers.
483	21 March; 05:45	7 hours, 5 minutes	12:50	Shenzhou 19; TSS Wentian	(China) Cai Xuzhe; (China) Song Lingdong	Installation of more space debris shield devices and checking the condition of extravehicular equipment.
484	1 May; 13:05	5 hours, 44 minutes	18:49	Expedition 73; ISS Quest	(United States) Anne McClain; (United States) Nichole Ayers	McClain and Ayers relocated a communications antenna, installed a mounting bracket for a future Roll Out Solar Array, installed a jumper cable to provide power from the P6 truss to the Russian Orbital Segment and removed bolts from a micrometeoroid cover.
485	22 May; 00:50	7 hours, 59 minutes	08:49	Shenzhou 20; TSS Tianhe	(China) Chen Dong; (China) Chen Zhongrui	Tasks included installation of more space debris protection devices and inspections of the exterior, fixing damages to the TSS. First Chinese EVA from core module since transitioning into application and development phase.
486	26 June; 07:04	6 hours, 25 minutes	13:29	Shenzhou 20; TSS Wentian	(China) Chen Dong; (China) Chen Zhongrui	Tasks included installation of more space debris protection devices and inspections of the exterior, fixing damages to the TSS. They added foot restraints and EVA interface adapters on portable work platform for future EVAs.
487	15 August; 08:00	6 hours, 47 minutes	14:47	Shenzhou 20; TSS Wentian	(China) Chen Dong; (China) Wang Jie	Tasks included completing installation of debris protection devices and auxiliary extravehicular facilities, and inspecting and maintaining external equipment.
488	25 September; 11:30	6 hours, 35 minutes	17:35	Shenzhou 20; TSS Wentian	(China) Chen Zhongrui; (China) Wang Jie	Tasks included completing installation of debris protection devices for the space station and inspecting external equipment and facilities. It marked the first time that two members of China's third batch of taikonauts jointly carried out an EVA. So far, the Shenzhou-20 crew has completed four EVAs, making them one of the Chinese crews with the most extravehicular missions.
489	16 October; 17:10	6 hours, 9 minutes	23:19	Expedition 73; ISS Poisk	(Russia) Sergey Ryzhikov; (Russia) Alexey Zubritsky	Ryzhikov and Zubritsky ventured out and installed the Ekran-M payload onto the Nauka Module frame, jettisoned some cameras and a mounting platform, and cleaned the windows on the Zvezda Service Module. As getahead task they removed SKK panel 3 and Biorisk container 2 and brought them inside.
490	28 October; 14:18	6 hours, 54 minutes	21:12	Expedition 73; ISS Poisk	(Russia) Sergey Ryzhikov; (Russia) Alexey Zubritsky	Ryzhikov and Zubritsky ventured out and installed the IPI plasma injector onto the Nauka Module, relocated the ERA control panel, cleaned the Nauka science window, and replaced a cassette in the Ekran-M payload which was installed on the last spacewalk. The original task to jettison some hardware on the Zvezda Service Module and some window cleaning equipment will be moved to the next spacewalk to prevent debris strikes on the HTV-X, which is on final approach.
491	9 December; 02:28	8 hours, 17 minutes	10:45	Shenzhou 21; TSS Wentian	(China) Zhang Lu; (China) Wu Fei	Tasks included inspecting and photographing the window of the Shenzhou 20 reentry capsule, installing space debris protection devices outside the Tianhe core module, and replacing the multi-layer cover of the temperature control adapter.

=== 2026 spacewalks ===
#	Start date/time	Duration	End time	Spacecraft	Crew	Remarks
493	18 March; 12:52	7 hours, 2 minutes	18 March; 19:54	Expedition 74	(United States) Jessica Meir; (United States) Christopher Williams	Meir and Williams ventured out and prepared the 2A power channel for future installation of the iROSA to provide additional power, broke torque on batteries and the DDCU, routed cables, and inspected the port SARJ in preparation for a second trundle bearing replacement on a later spacewalk. The getahead task of installing a lenses cover on Canadarm 2 and swabbing the hull near the Airlock, their gloves, and the Destiny Lab for microbes was moved to a later spacewalk because of time to troubleshoot some stubborn bolts on the iROSA kit and to mate some electrical caps on the P3 Truss. It was originally scheduled to be performed by Zena Cardman and Michael Fincke on January 8, but it was cancelled due to a crewmember "medical situation", along with another spacewalk on January 15, during which two crew members were planned to replace a high-definition camera, install a new navigational aid for visiting spacecraft on the Harmony module’s forward port, and relocate an early ammonia servicer jumper, a flexible hose assembly that connects parts of a fluid system, along with other jumpers on the station’s S6 and S4 truss.
495	27 May; 14:18	6 hours, 5 minutes	27 May; 20:23	Expedition 74	(Russia) Sergey Kud-Sverchkov; (Russia) Sergei Mikayev	Kud-Sverchkov and Mikayev ventured out and installed Solntse-Teragerts, which is a solar radiation experiment on the Zvezda Service Module, removed and replaced a cassette in the Ekran-M payload on the Nauka Module, removed Biorisk from Poisk, and photographed one of the Progress 94 cargo spacecraft’s Kurs rendezvous antennas that failed to deploy in March following its launch to the space station and secured it with wire ties.
496	30 June; 12:20	7 hours, 20 minutes	30 June; 19:40	Expedition 74	(United States) Jessica Meir; (United States) Christopher Williams	Meir and Williams ventured out, released the wrist joint replacement module on ESP2, and swapped it for a degraded one, which was brought in at the end of the spacewalk to return Canadarm2 to operations.
497	28 August; 08:29	5 hours, 30 minutes	28 August; 13:59	Shenzhou 23; TSS Tianhe	(China) Zhu Yangzhu; (China) Zhang Zhiyuan	EVA tasks included external repairs on the solar wings of the space station and installation of protection devices from space debris.

== See also ==
- Lists of spacewalks and moonwalks
