= China Manned Space Agency =

Office for China's human spaceflight program

- 中国载人航天工程办公室

Government agency overview
- Formed: June 1993; 33 years ago
- Jurisdiction: China
- Headquarters: Haidian, Beijing
- Government agency executives: Hao Chun, Director; Lin Xiqiang, Deputy Director
- Parent Government agency: Equipment Development Department of the Central Military Commission
- Website: en.cmse.gov.cn

China Manned Space Agency (abbreviated as CMSA) is a government agency of China responsible for the administration of China Manned Space Program, the Chinese human spaceflight program. The agency is under the Equipment Development Department of the Central Military Commission.

== Name ==
The native name of the organization (中国载人航天工程办公室) was initially translated into English as "China Manned Space Engineering Office" as of 2014. However, ever since 2015, the name "China Manned Space Agency" has been used in official statements and news-releases till date, and its native name remains unchanged. It is also the name displayed on the official website of China Manned Space Program.

== Functions ==
China Manned Space Agency represents the Chinese government to take management responsibilities for the China Manned Space Program.

CMSA's functions including development strategy, planning, overall technology, research and production, infrastructure construction, flight missions organization and implementation, utilization and promotion, international cooperation and news-release, etc.

== Organizational structure ==
CMSA consists of the following divisions:

- Integrated Planning & Management Division
- Scientific Program & Quality Control Division
- Utilization & Development Division
- Infrastructure Construction Division
- System Division

== Taikonauts ==
As of April 2025, twenty-six Chinese taikonauts have traveled to space (in alphabetical order):

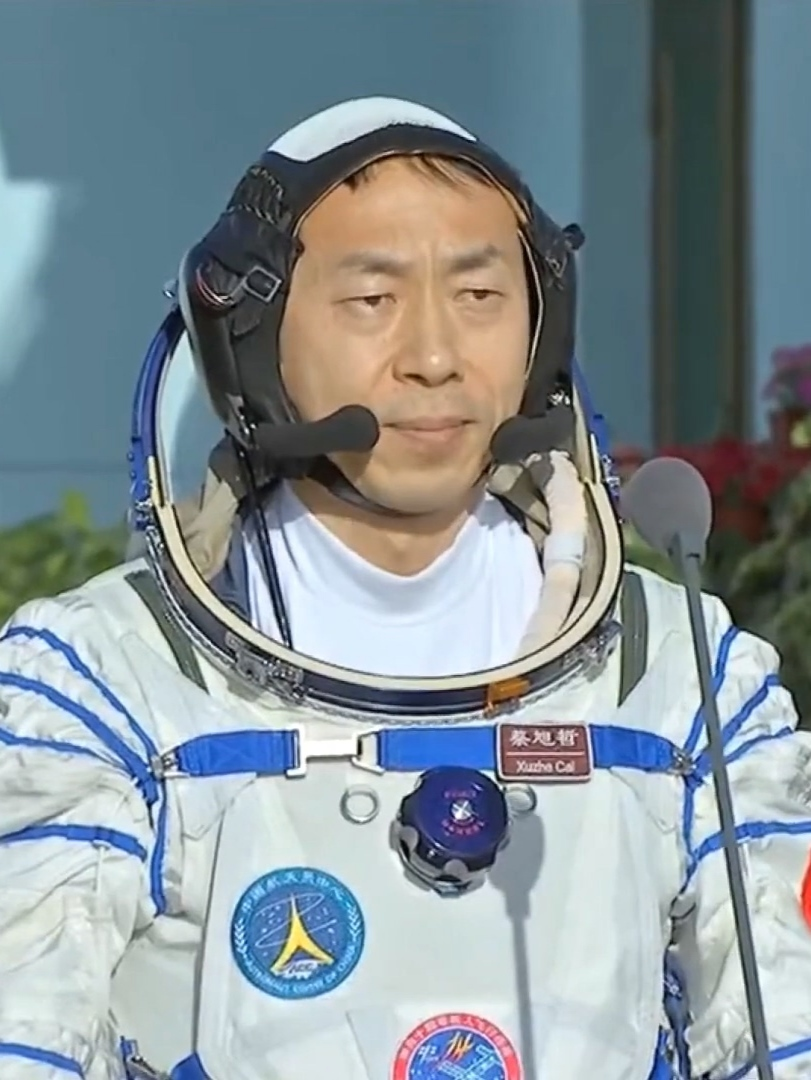
Cai Xuzhe (蔡旭哲)

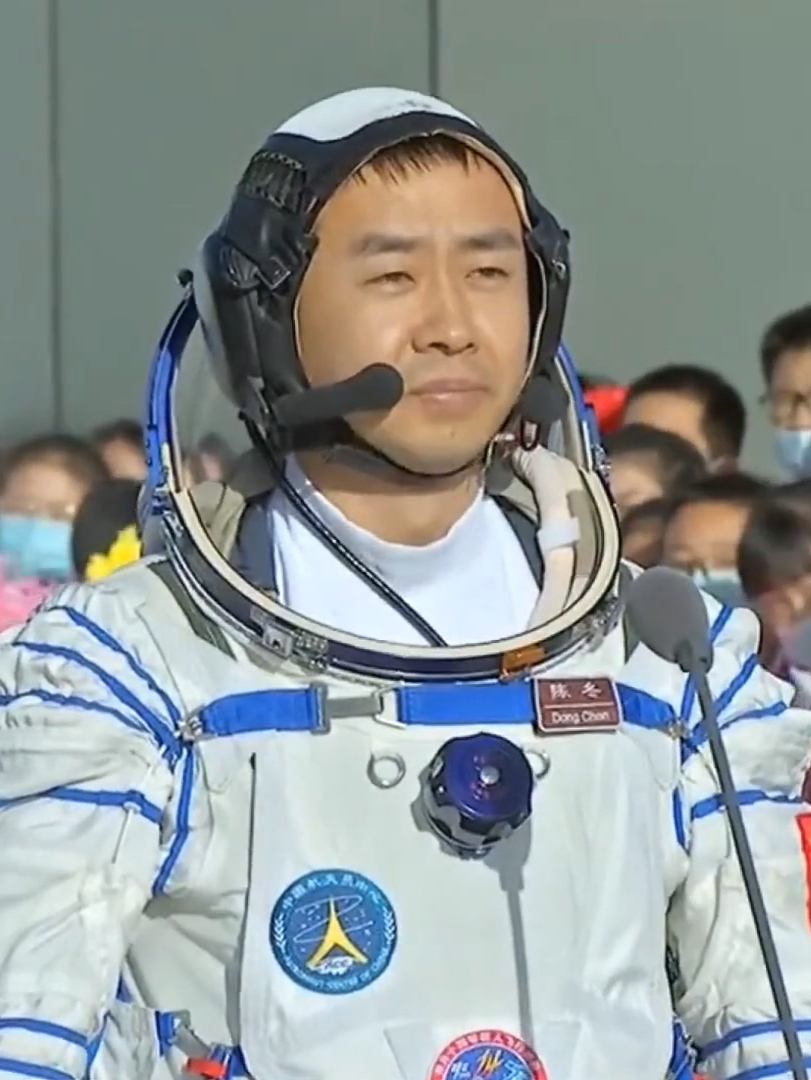
Chen Dong (陈冬)

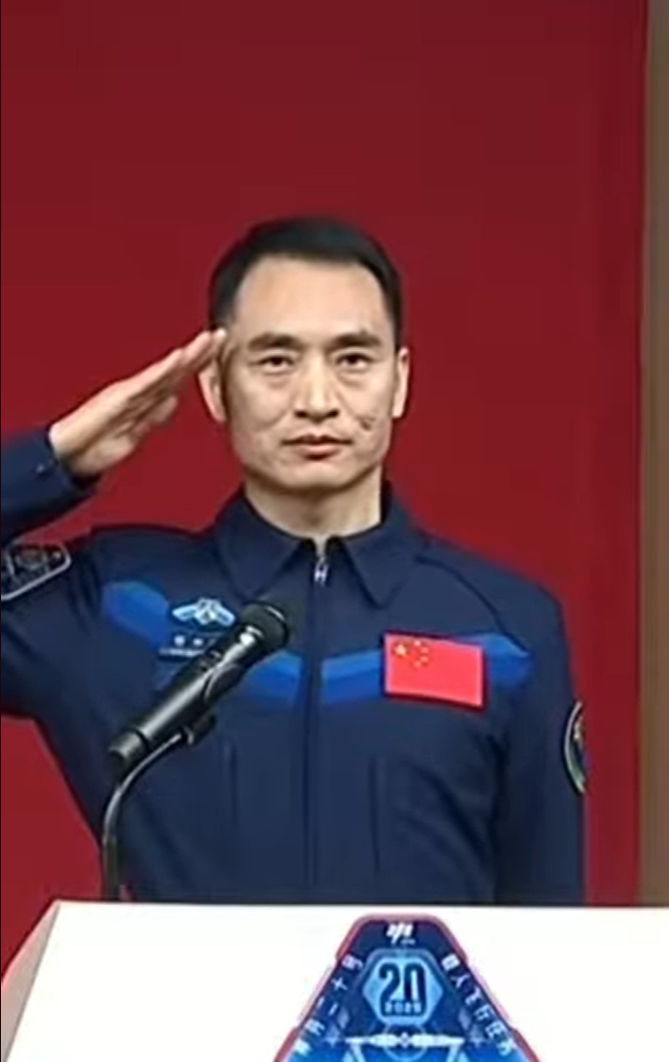
Chen Zhongrui (陈中瑞)

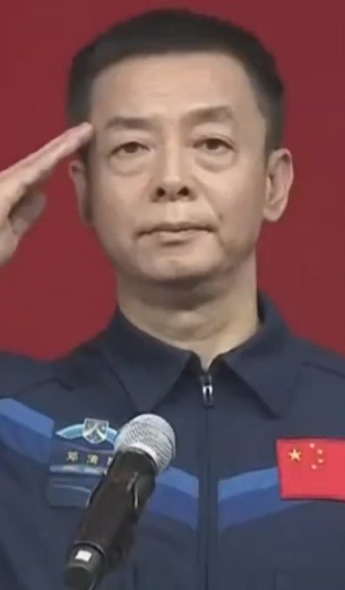
Deng Qingming (邓清明)

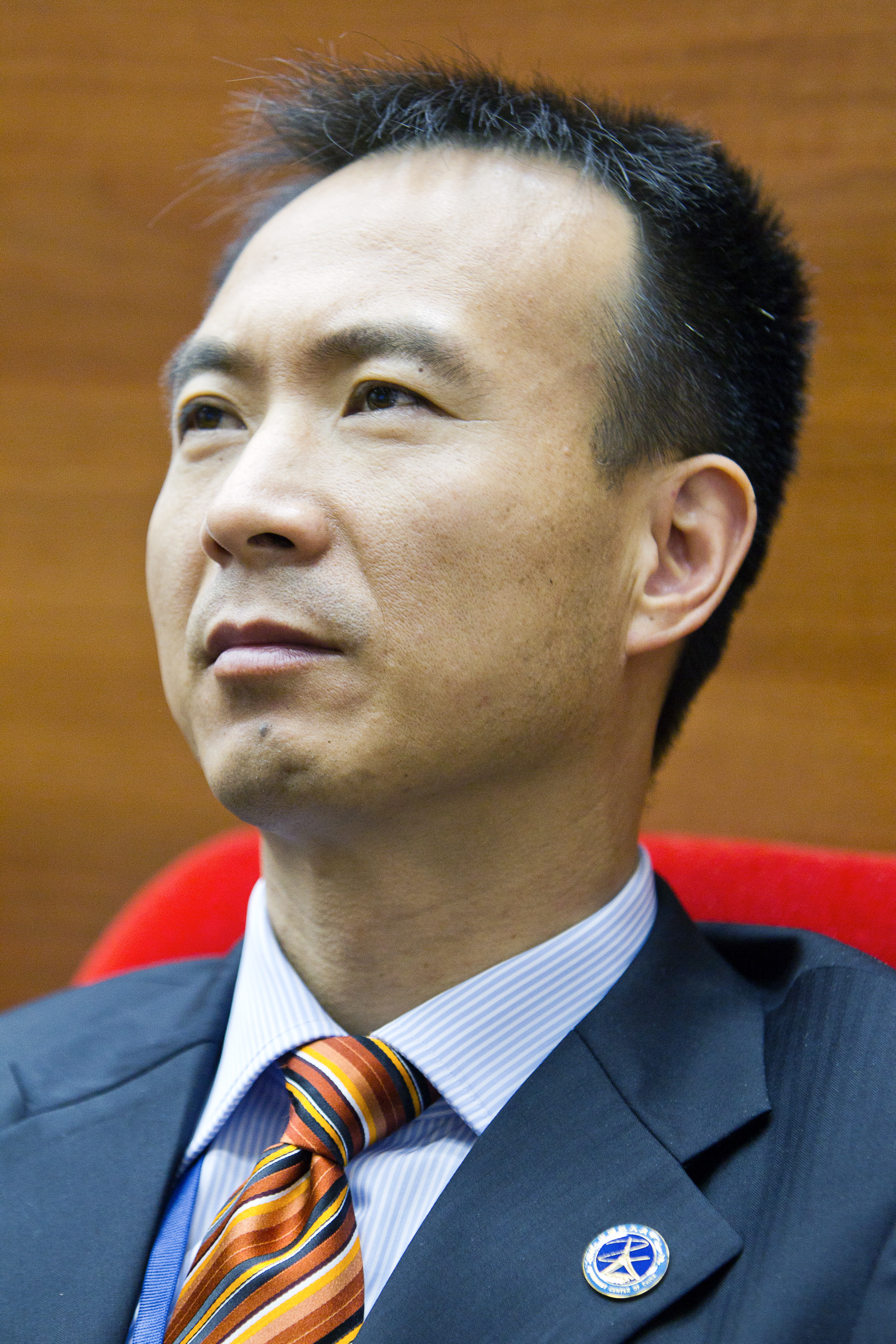
Fei Junlong (费俊龙)

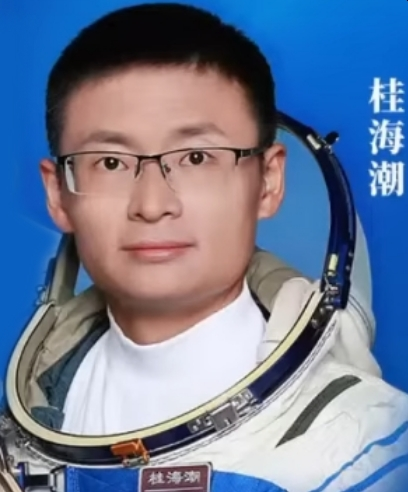
Gui Haichao (桂海潮)

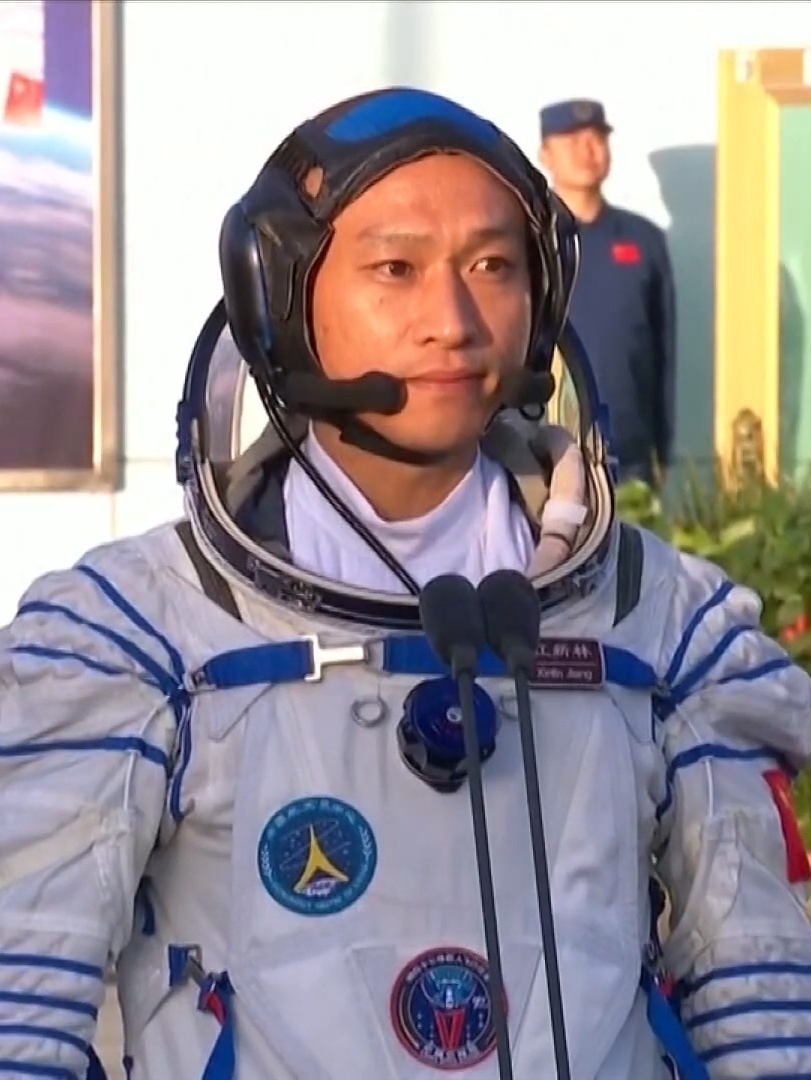
Jiang Xinlin (蒋新林)

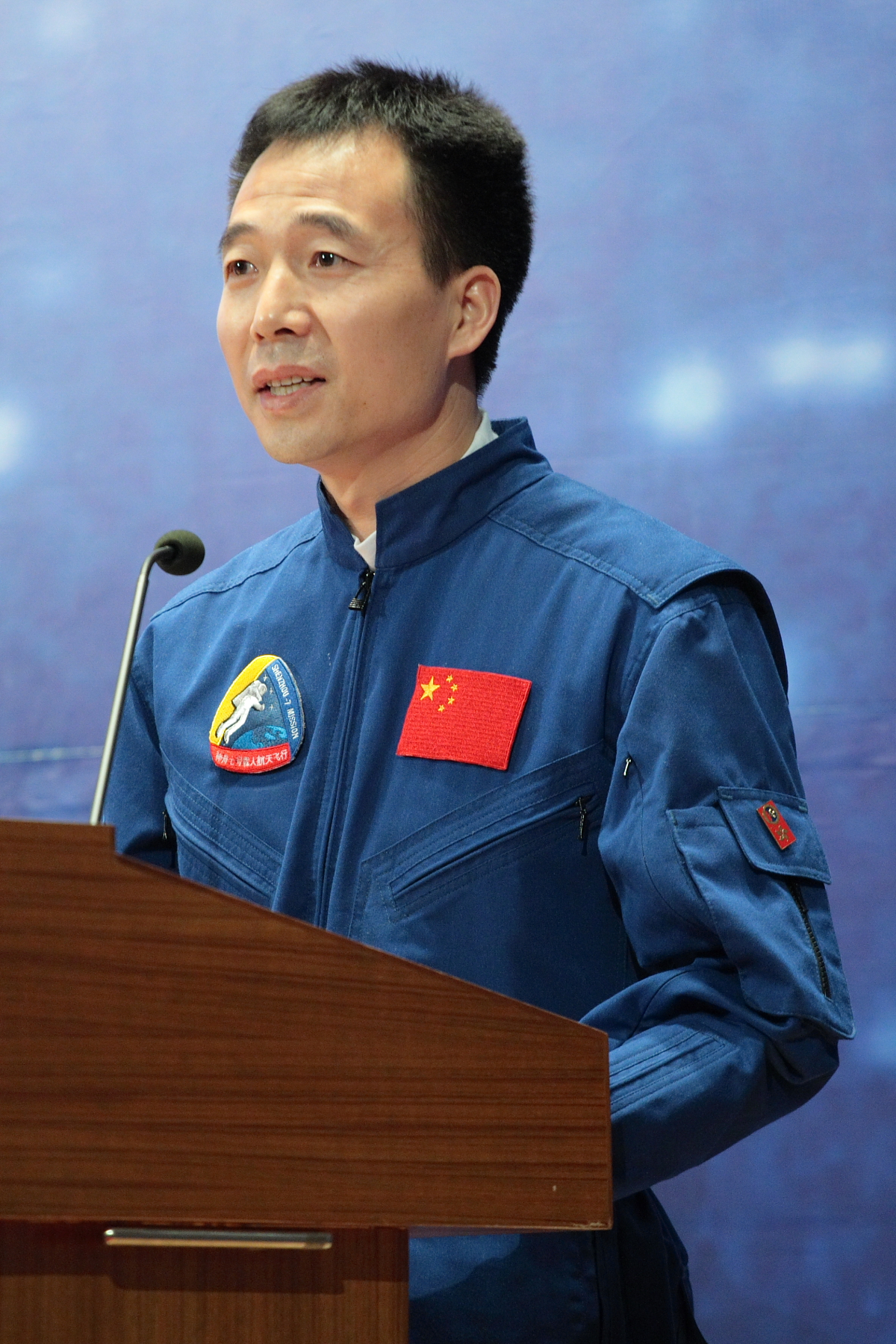
Jing Haipeng (景海鹏)

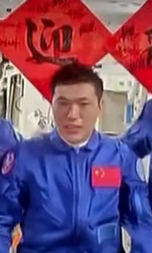
Li Cong (李聪)

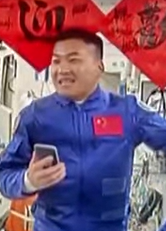
Li Guangsu (李广苏)

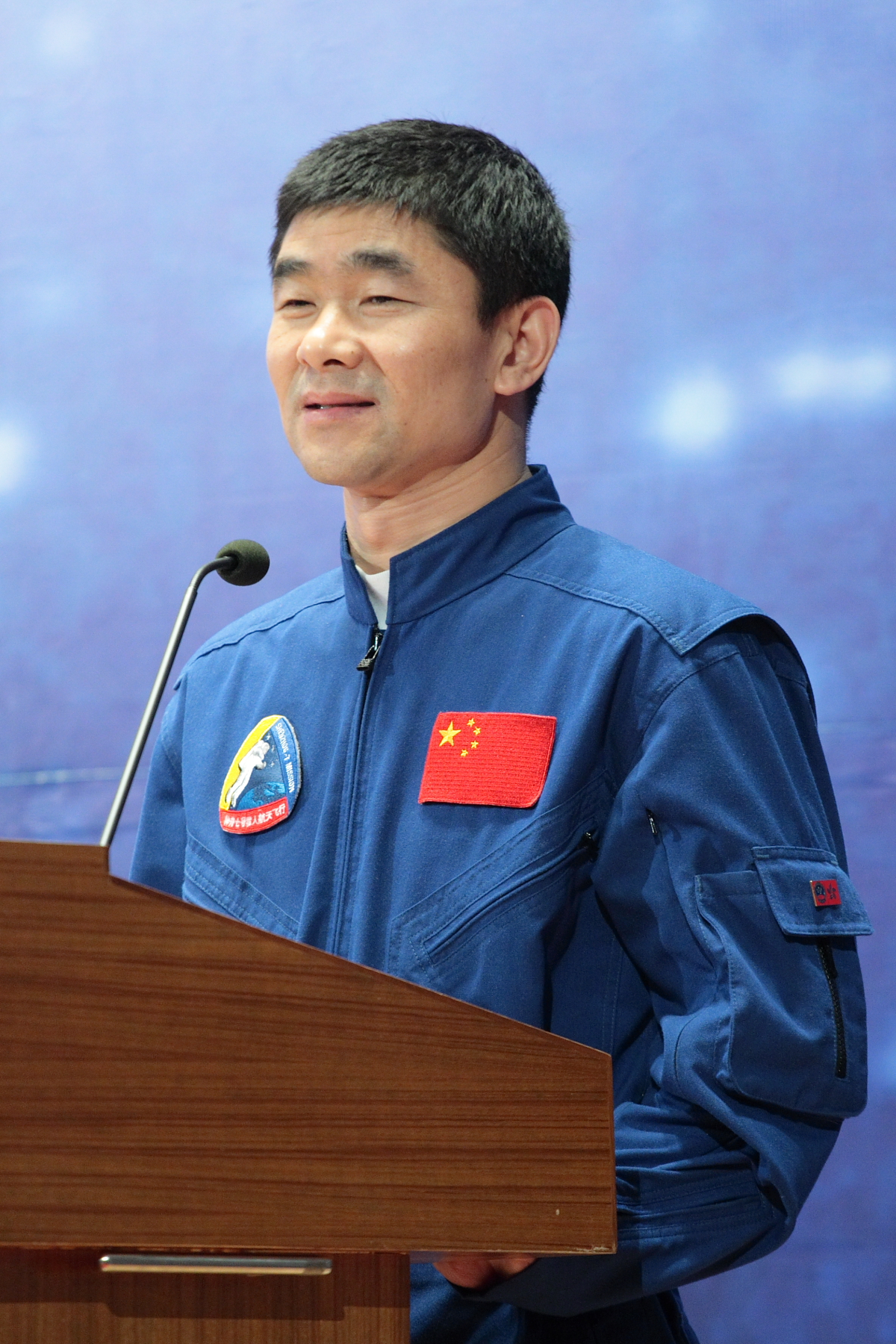
Liu Boming (刘伯明)

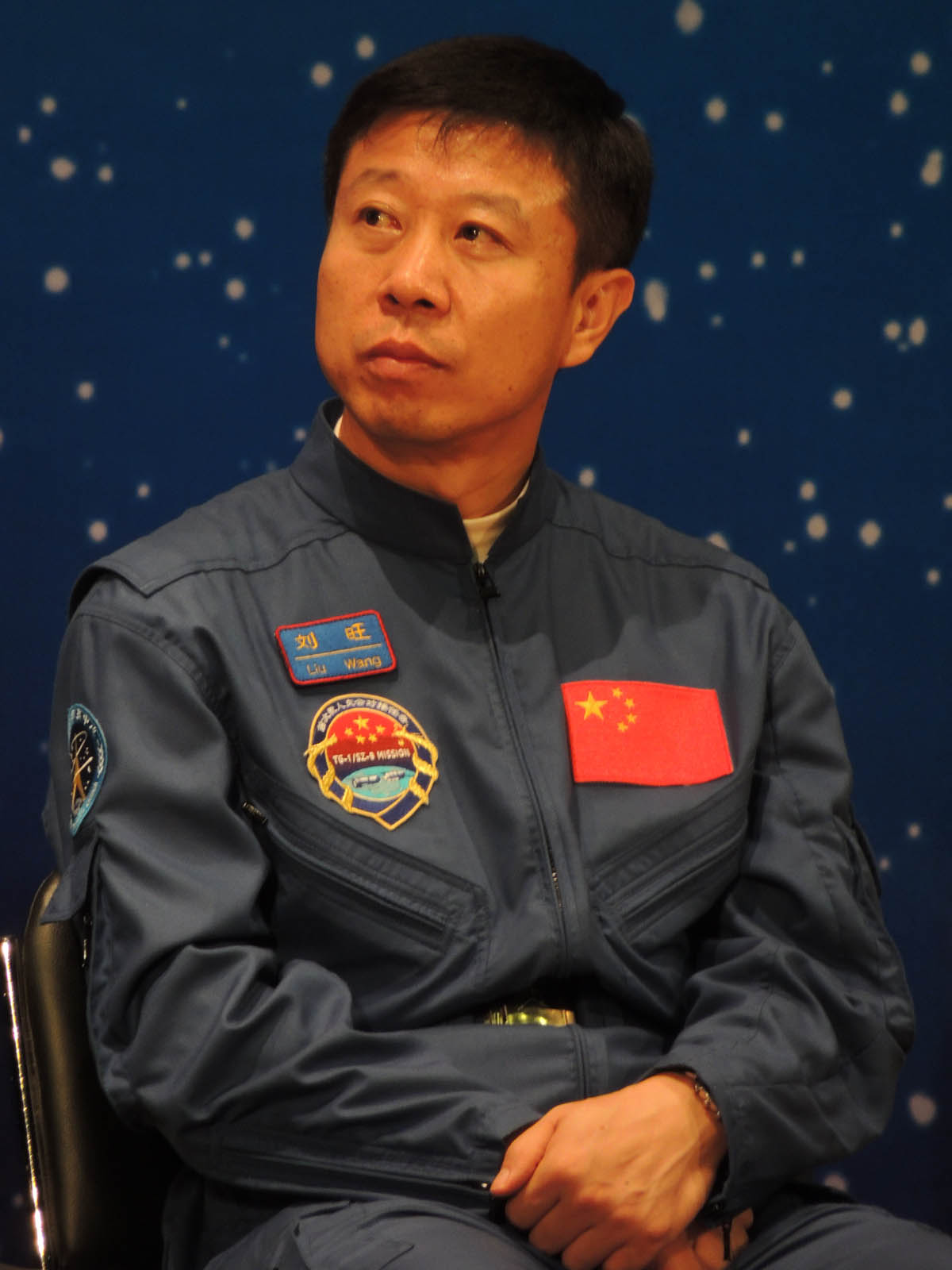
Liu Wang (刘旺)

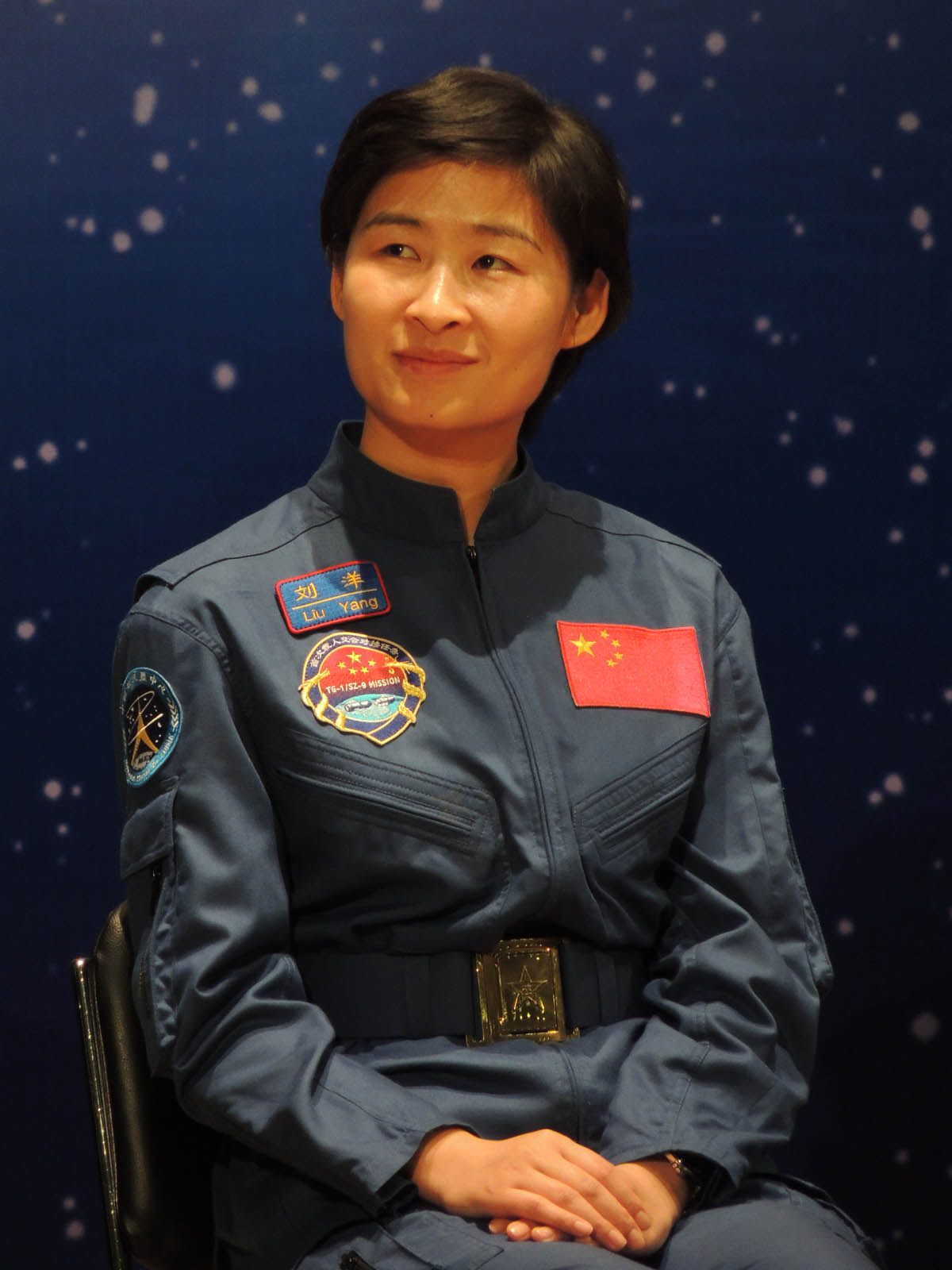
Liu Yang (刘洋)

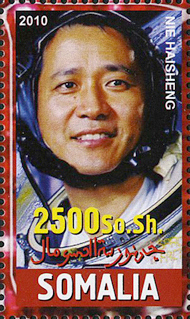
Nie Haisheng (聂海胜)

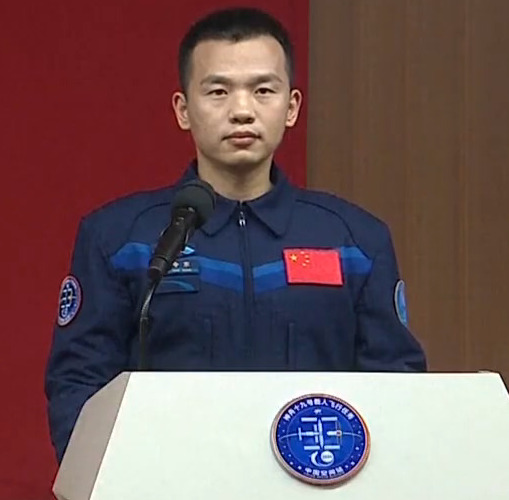
Song Lingdong (宋令东)

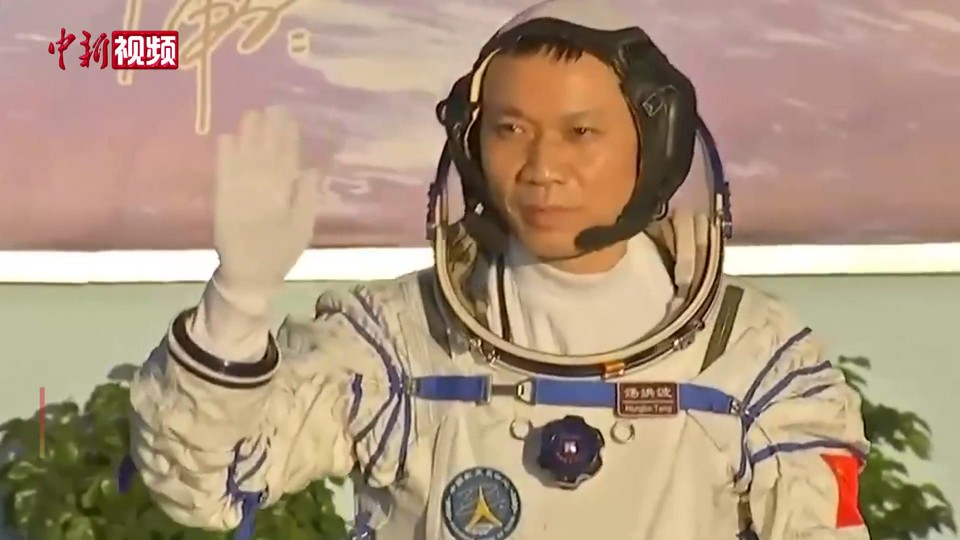
Tang Hongbo (汤洪波)

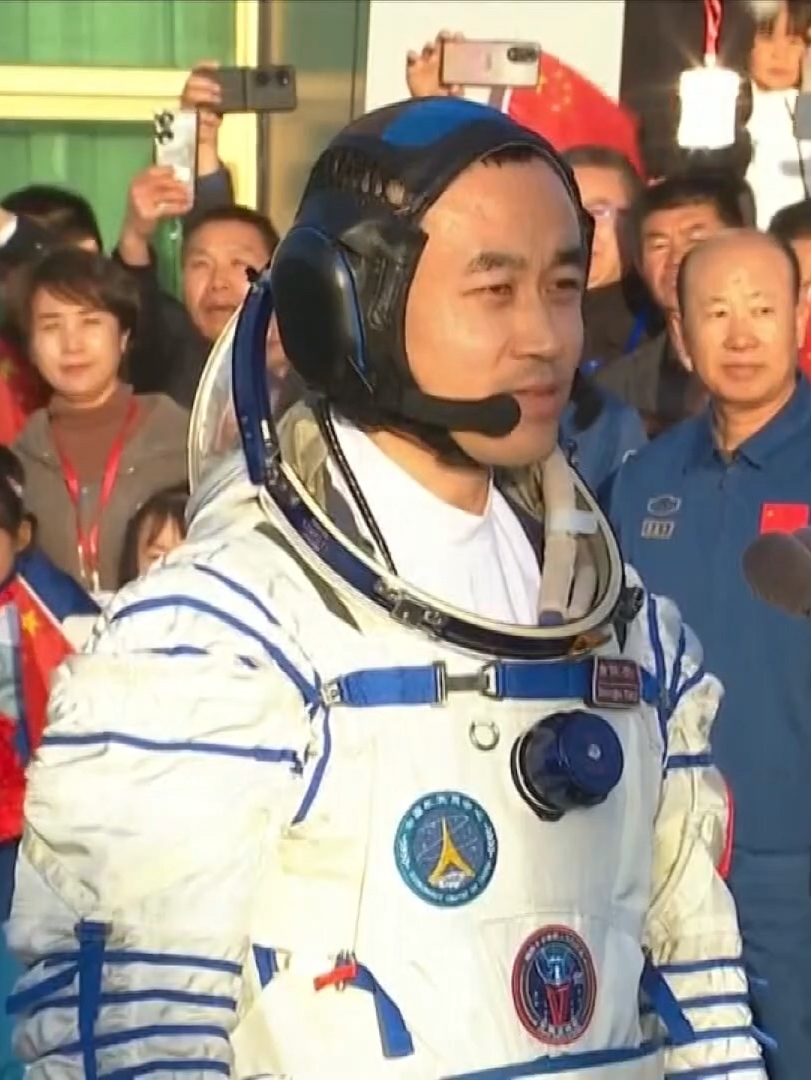
Tang Shengjie (唐胜杰)

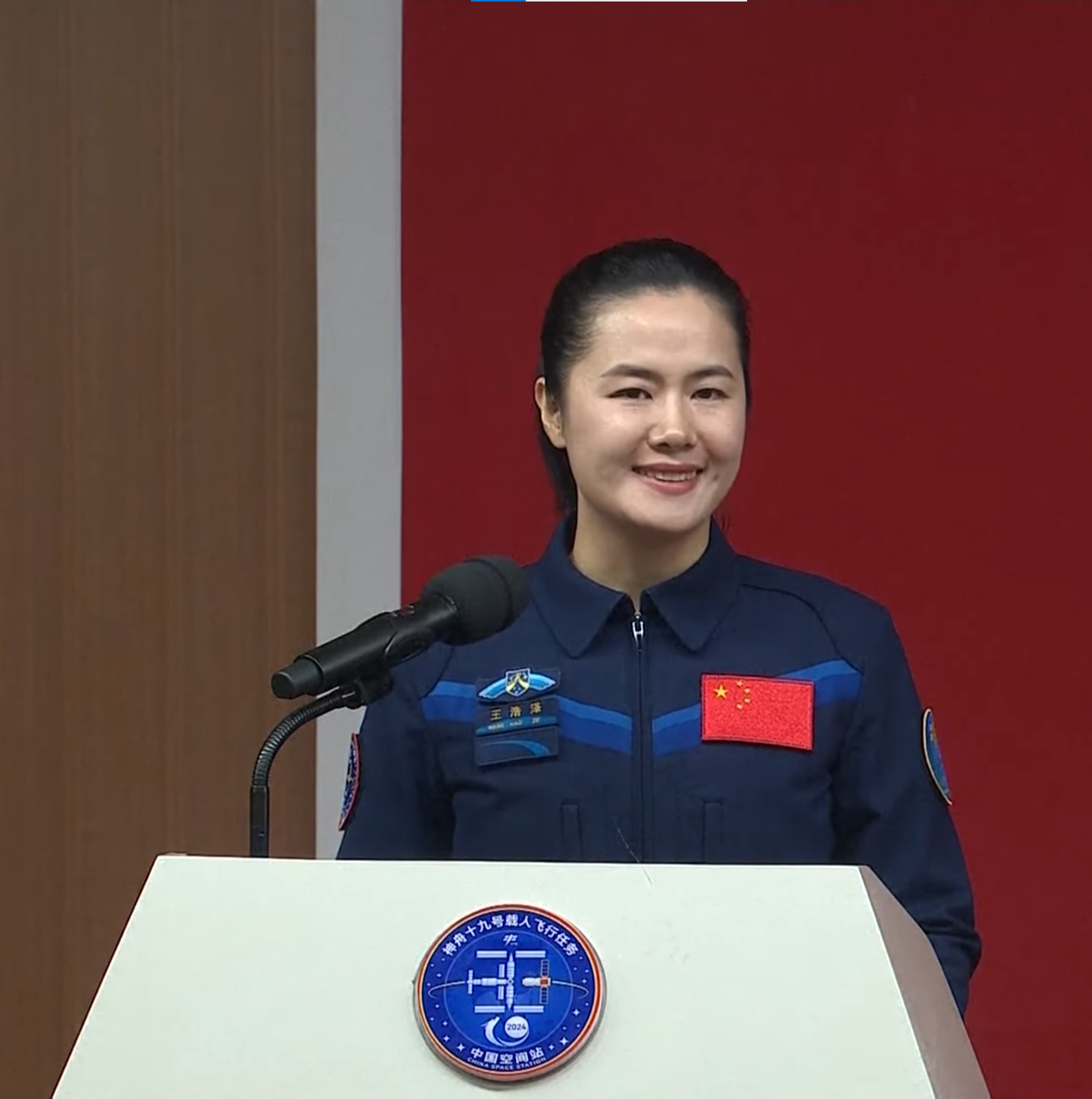
Wang Haoze (王浩泽)

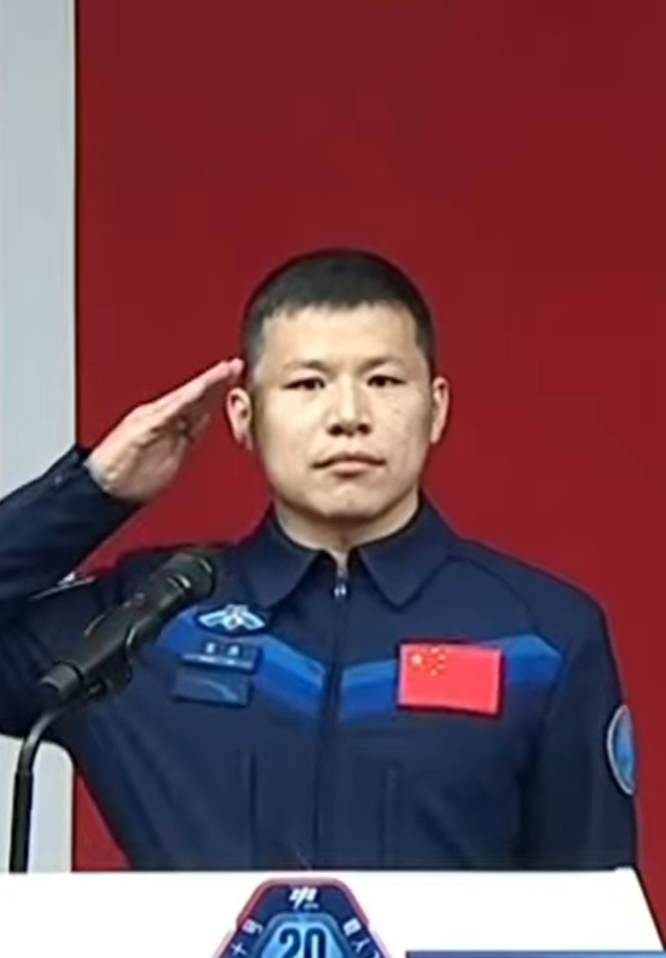
Wang Jie (王杰)

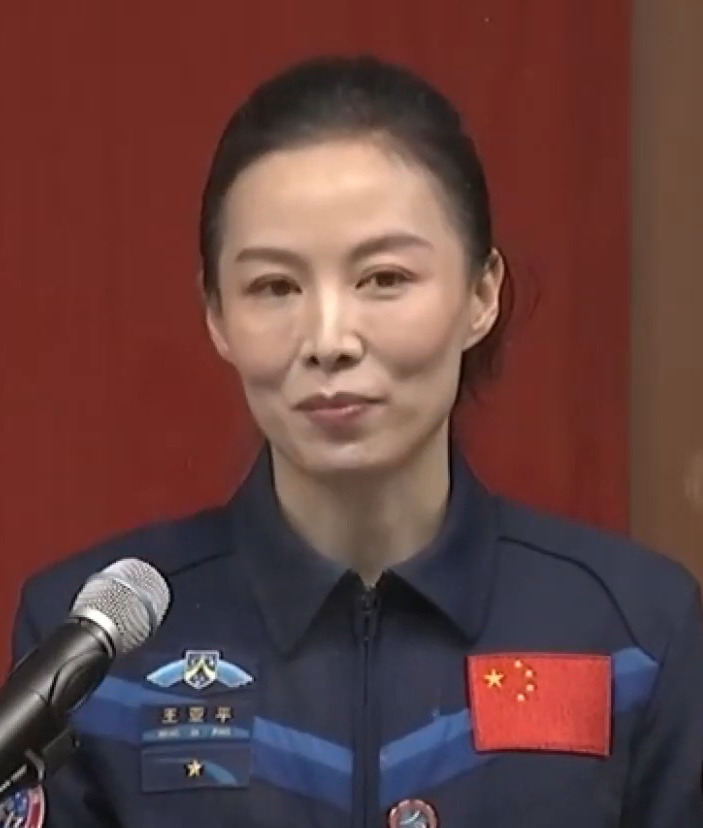
Wang Yaping (王亚平)

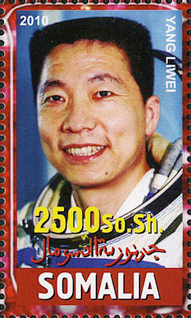
Yang Liwei (杨利伟)

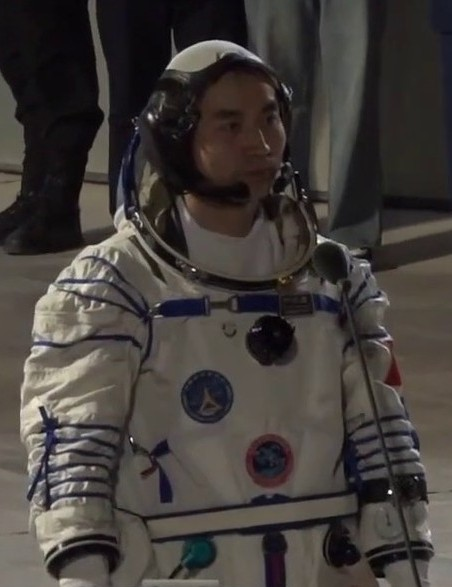
Ye Guangfu (叶光富)

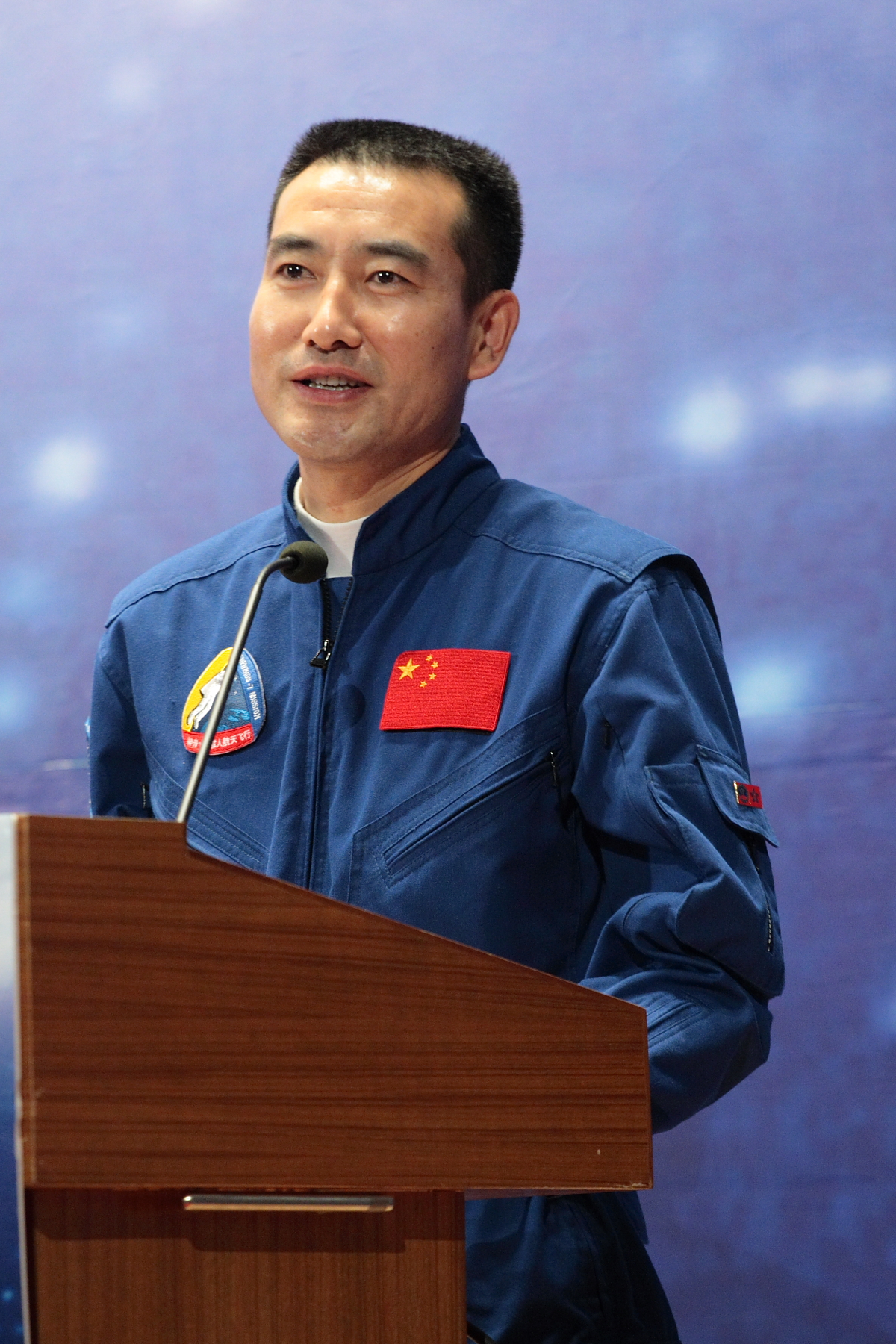
Zhai Zhigang (翟志刚)

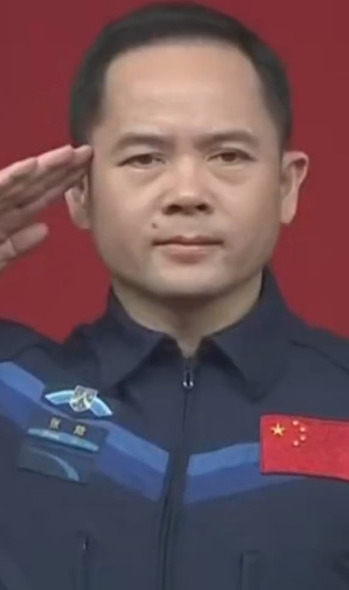
Zhang Lu (张陆)

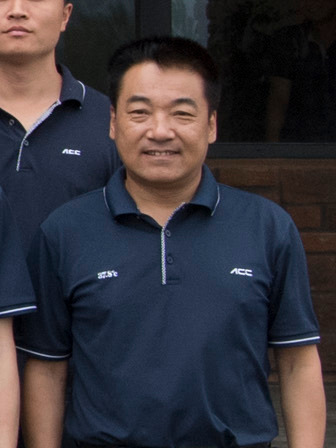
Zhang Xiaoguang (张晓光)

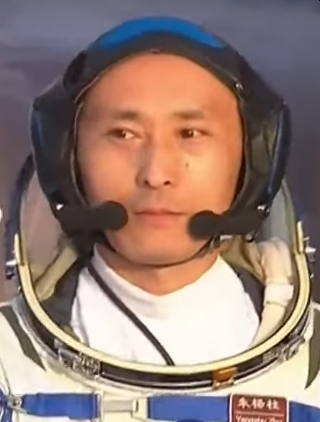
Zhu Yangzhu (朱杨柱)

== International cooperation ==
In 2016, the United Nations Office for Outer Space Affairs (UNOOSA) and CMSA agreed to increased space cooperation via opportunities on-board China's future space station.

In 2018, UNOOSA and CMSA invited the applications from United Nations Member States to conduct experiments on-board China's Space Station.

On 12 June 2019, UNOOSA and CMSA announced the winners of the selected experiments to be boarded onto the space station.
