= List of Chinese astronauts =

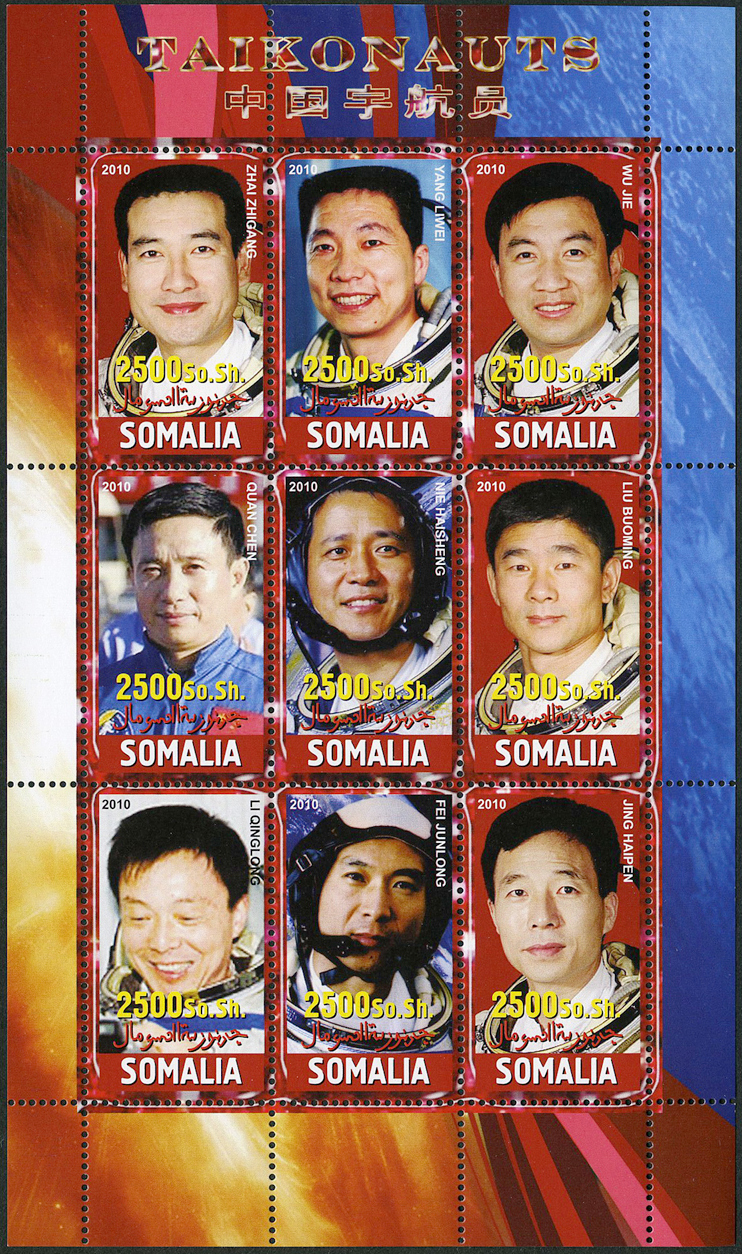
Chinese taikonauts on a 2010 counterfeit Somalia stamp

This is a list of Chinese astronauts (Chinese: 航天员 hángtiānyuán). The list includes individuals trained by the China National Space Administration (CNSA) to command, pilot, or serve as crew members aboard spacecraft.

As the Chinese space program developed during the sixties, various proposals for crewed spacecraft were made. The first crewed spacecraft proposed by the People's Republic of China during the late 1960s and early 1970s was the Shuguang One which was expected to bring the first Chinese astronaut in 1973 into space. For this programme 19 astronauts were selected in 1971. However, shortly after these plans were made, several leading scientists attached to the project were denounced, bringing progress to a standstill. Instead, NASA astronaut Taylor Wang, a naturalized U.S. citizen born in China, became the first ethnically Chinese person in space in 1985.

The People's Liberation Army Astronaut Corps was established in 1998 for the selection of Shenzhou program astronauts. In 2003, Yang Liwei was launched aboard Shenzhou 5, becoming the first person sent into space by the Chinese space program. This achievement made China the third country to independently send humans into space. During the Shenzhou 7 mission in 2008, Zhai Zhigang became the first Chinese citizen to carry out a spacewalk. In 2012, Liu Yang became the first Chinese woman to be launched into space aboard Shenzhou 9 and also the first aboard a space station Tiangong-1. In 2021, Wang Yaping became the first Chinese woman to walk in space during the Shenzhou 13 mission. In 2023, Gui Haichao became the first civilian astronaut not enlisted in the People's Liberation Army Astronaut Corps and is the first mission payload specialist. In 2024, Wang Haoze became the third Chinese woman to travel to space on the Shenzhou 19 mission and is the only female spaceflight engineer.

As of 24 May 2026, thirty Chinese nationals have traveled in space.

== Astronauts ==
=== Flown ===
| Name | Name in Chinese | Image | Mission(s) (dates) | Time in space | Notes |
|---|---|---|---|---|---|
| Yang Liwei | 杨利伟 | | Shenzhou 5 (October 15, 2003) | 21 h 22 m | First Chinese national in space. First solo person in space who was not flown on a Soviet/Russian or American spacecraft. |
| Fei Junlong | 费俊龙 | | Shenzhou 6 (October 12–16, 2005); Shenzhou 15 (November 29, 2022–June 3, 2023) | 191 d 2 h 58 m | Commander of the first two-person Chinese crew in space. |
| Nie Haisheng | 聂海胜 | | Shenzhou 6 (October 12–16, 2005); Shenzhou 10 (June 11–26, 2013); Shenzhou 12 (June 17–September 17, 2021) | 111 d 14 h 13 m | Member of the first two-person Chinese crew in space. |
| Jing Haipeng | 景海鹏 | | Shenzhou 7 (September 25–28, 2008); Shenzhou 9 (June 16–29, 2012); Shenzhou 11 (October 17–November 18, 2016); Shenzhou 16 (May 30, 2023–October 31, 2023) | 201 d 17 h 2 m | Member of the first three-person Chinese crew in space. First repeat Chinese national in space. Commander of the first Chinese crew to achieve crewed spacecraft docking. |
| Liu Boming | 刘伯明 | | Shenzhou 7 (September 25–28, 2008); Shenzhou 12 (June 17–September 17, 2021) | 95 d 38 m | Member of the first three-person Chinese crew in space. |
| Zhai Zhigang | 翟志刚 | | Shenzhou 7 (September 25–28, 2008); Shenzhou 13 (October 15, 2021–April 16, 2022) | 185 d 5 h 59 m | First Chinese national to walk in space. Commander of the first Chinese three-person crew in space. |
| Liu Wang | 刘旺 | | Shenzhou 9 (June 16–29, 2012) | 12 d 15 h 25 m | Member of the first Chinese crew to achieve crewed spacecraft docking. |
| Liu Yang | 刘洋 | | Shenzhou 9 (June 16–29, 2012); Shenzhou 14 (June 5–December 4, 2022) | 195 d 50 m | First Chinese woman in space. Member of first Chinese crew to achieve crewed spacecraft docking. |
| Zhang Xiaoguang | 张晓光 | | Shenzhou 10 (June 11–26, 2013) | 14 d 14 h 29 m | Conducted crewed spacecraft rendezvous and docking. |
| Wang Yaping | 王亚平 | | Shenzhou 10 (June 11–26, 2013); Shenzhou 13 (October 15, 2021–April 16, 2022) | 197 d 1 m | First Chinese woman to travel twice in space. First Chinese woman to walk in space. |
| Chen Dong | 陈冬 | | Shenzhou 11 (October 17–November 18, 2016); Shenzhou 14 (June 5–December 4, 2022); Shenzhou 20 (April 24, 2025–present) | 418 d 11 h 14 m | |
| Tang Hongbo | 汤洪波 | | Shenzhou 12 (June 17–September 17, 2021); Shenzhou 17 (October 26, 2023-April 30, 2024) | 279 d 10 h 43 m | |
| Ye Guangfu | 叶光富 | | Shenzhou 13 (October 15, 2021–April 16, 2022); Shenzhou 18 (April 25, 2024–November 4, 2024) | 374 d 13 h 54 m | |
| Cai Xuzhe | 蔡旭哲 | | Shenzhou 14 (June 5–December 4, 2022); Shenzhou 19 (October 29, 2024–April 30, 2025) | 364 d 18 h 7 m | |
| Deng Qingming | 邓清明 | | Shenzhou 15 (November 29, 2022–June 3, 2023) | 186 d 7 h 25 m | |
| Zhang Lu | 张陆 | | Shenzhou 15 (November 29, 2022–June 3, 2023); Shenzhou 21 (October 31, 2025–present) | > 389 d | |
| Zhu Yangzhu | 朱杨柱 | | Shenzhou 16 (May 30, 2023–October 31, 2023); Shenzhou 23 (May 24, 2026-present) | 153 d 22 h 41 m | |
| Tang Shengjie | 唐胜杰 | | Shenzhou 17 (October 26, 2023–April 30, 2024) | 187 d 6 h 32 m | |
| Jiang Xinlin | 江新林 | | Shenzhou 17 (October 26, 2023–April 30, 2024) | 187 d 6 h 32 m | |
| Li Cong | 李聪 | | Shenzhou 18 (April 25, 2024–November 4, 2024) | 192 d 4 h 25 m | |
| Li Guangsu | 李广苏 | | Shenzhou 18 (April 25, 2024–November 4, 2024) | 192 d 4 h 25 m | |
| Song Lingdong | 宋令东 | | Shenzhou 19 (October 29, 2024–April 30, 2025) | 182 d 8 h 42 m | |
| Wang Haoze | 王浩泽 | | Shenzhou 19 (October 29, 2024–April 30, 2025) | 182 d 8 h 42 m | |
| Chen Zhongrui | 陈中瑞 | | Shenzhou 20 (April 24, 2025–present) | 203 d 23 h 23 m | |
| Wang Jie | 王杰 | | Shenzhou 20 (April 24, 2025–present) | 203 d 23 h 23 m | |
| Wu Fei | 武飞 | | Shenzhou 21 (October 31, 2025–present) | > 203 d | |
| Zhang Hongzhang | 张和章 | | Shenzhou 21 (October 31, 2025–present) | > 203 d | |
| Zhang Zhiyuan | 张志远 | | Shenzhou 23 (May 24, 2026-present) | | |
| Lai Ka-ying | 黎家盈 | | Shenzhou 23 (May 24, 2026-present) | | First Hong Kong astronaut. First Hong Kong woman in space |

=== By selection group ===
Shuguang Group (May 1970)

- Chai Hongliang
- Dong Xiaohai
- Du Jincheng
- Fang Guojun
- Hu Zhanzi
- Li Shichang
- Liu Chongfu
- Liu Zhongyi
- Lu Xiangxiao
- Ma Zizhong
- Meng Senlin
- Shao Zhijian
- Wang Fuhe
- Wang Fuquan
- Wang Quanbo
- Wang Rongsen
- Wang Zhiyue
- Yu Guilin
- Zhang Ruxiang

Group 1

October 1996

- Li Qinglong (retired in 2014)
- Wu Jie (retired in 2014)

January 1998

- Chen Quan (retired in 2014)
- Deng Qingming (Shenzhou 15)
- Fei Junlong (commander Shenzhou 6, Shenzhou 15)
- Jing Haipeng (Shenzhou 7; commander Shenzhou 9, Shenzhou 11, Shenzhou 16)
- Liu Boming (Shenzhou 7, Shenzhou 12)
- Liu Wang (Shenzhou 9)
- Nie Haisheng (Shenzhou 6; commander Shenzhou 10, Shenzhou 12)
- Pan Zhanchun (retired in 2014)
- Yang Liwei (commander Shenzhou 5)
- Zhai Zhigang (commander Shenzhou 7, Shenzhou 13)
- Zhang Xiaoguang (Shenzhou 10)
- Zhao Chuandong (retired in 2014)

Group 2 (March 2010)

- Cai Xuzhe (Shenzhou 14; commander Shenzhou 19)
- Chen Dong (Shenzhou 11, commander Shenzhou 14, commander Shenzhou 20)
- Liu Yang (Shenzhou 9, Shenzhou 14)
- Tang Hongbo (Shenzhou 12; commander Shenzhou 17)
- Wang Yaping (Shenzhou 10, Shenzhou 13)
- Ye Guangfu (Shenzhou 13; commander Shenzhou 18)
- Zhang Lu (Shenzhou 15); commander Shenzhou 21)

Group 3 (October 2020)

China announced that 18 people, 17 men and 1 woman, had been selected as new astronauts. The positions were broken down as 7 spacecraft pilots ("aviators of the People's Liberation Army Air Force"), 7 flight engineers ("former researchers or technicians in aeronautics, astronautics and other related fields"), and 4 mission payload specialists ("those involved in space science and through applications for China's manned space program").

As of May 2026, only names of those selected to fly to space have been revealed.

- Gui Haichao (Shenzhou 16)
- Zhu Yangzhu (Shenzhou 16; commander Shenzhou 23)
- Tang Shengjie (Shenzhou 17)
- Jiang Xinlin (Shenzhou 17)
- Li Cong (Shenzhou 18)
- Li Guangsu (Shenzhou 18)
- Song Lingdong (Shenzhou 19)
- Wang Haoze (Shenzhou 19)
- Chen Zhongrui (Shenzhou 20)
- Wang Jie (Shenzhou 20)
- Wu Fei (Shenzhou 21)
- Zhang Hongzhang (Shenzhou 21)
- Zhang Zhiyuan (Shenzhou 23)

Group 4 (June 2024)

On October 2022, China announced that 12 to 14 people are to be selected as new astronauts. The positions were broken down as 7-8 spacecraft pilots ("aviators of the People's Liberation Army Air Force") and 5-6 spaceflight engineers ("former researchers or technicians in aeronautics, astronautics and other related fields"). Up to two of the latter group will become payload specialists ("those involved in space science and through applications for China's manned space program"). Candidacy was extended to include Hong Kong and Macau.

On June 11, 2024 China announced 10 candidate astronauts, including 8 spacecraft pilots and 2 payload specialists from Hong Kong SAR and Macau SAR. Reports prior to this announcement revealed that Lai Ka-Ying of Hong Kong was one of the women selected in the fourth group. The new astronauts will train for two years for both space station missions and crewed lunar missions.

As of May 2026, only names of those selected to fly to space have been revealed.

- Lai Ka-ying (Shenzhou 23)

== See also ==
- Chinese women in space
- Chinese American astronauts
  - Taylor Wang
  - Franklin Chang-Díaz
  - Leroy Chiao
  - Ed Lu
- Other ethnic Chinese space travellers
  - Chun Wang
  - Justin Sun
- List of astronauts
- List of Asian astronauts
- List of astronauts by selection
  - Shuguang Group 1970 list
  - China Group 1996 list
  - Chinese Group 1 list
