= Chen Quan =

Chinese pilot

- 陈全
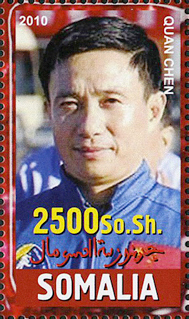
- Born: December 1963 (age 62)
- Space career

PLAAC astronaut
- Previous occupation: People's Liberation Army Air Force fighter pilot
- Status: Retired
- Rank: Senior colonel
- Selection: Chinese Group 1 (1998)
- Missions: None
- Retired: 2014

Chen Quan (simplified Chinese: 陈全; traditional Chinese: 陳全; pinyin: Chén Quán; born December 1963) is a Chinese pilot selected as part of the Shenzhou program.

Chen was born in Suining, Sichuan, China.

He joined the People's Liberation Army Air Force and became a fighter interceptor pilot and later as a regiment commander in the PLAAF.

== Career as an astronaut ==
Chen was selected to be an astronaut in 1998 and served as commander of the backup crew for Shenzhou 7 which flew in September 2008.

Chen Quan retired from the Astronaut Corps in 2014.

== See also ==
- List of Chinese astronauts
