= Lists of spacewalks and moonwalks =

The Lists of spacewalks and moonwalks include:

== By date ==
- List of spacewalks and moonwalks 1965–1999
- List of spacewalks 2000–2014
- List of spacewalks 2015–2024
- List of spacewalks since 2025

== By space station ==
- List of Salyut spacewalks
- List of Mir spacewalks
- List of International Space Station spacewalks
- List of Tiangong space station spacewalks

== Other lists ==
- List of cumulative spacewalk records
- List of longest spacewalks
- List of spacewalkers

== See also ==
- Extravehicular activity
