= Zhang Hongzhang =

Chinese taikonaut (born 1986)

- 张洪章
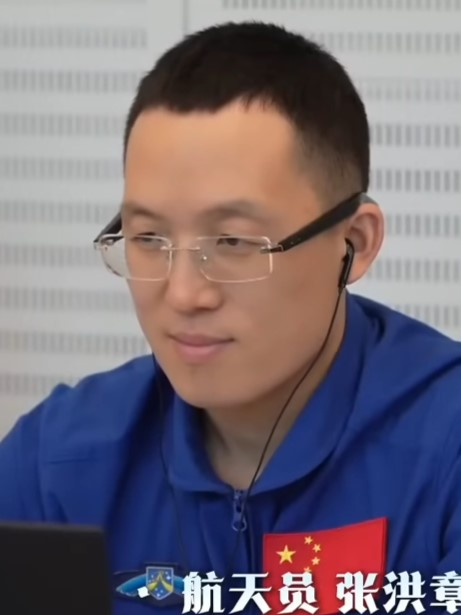
- Born: April 1986 (age 40); Zouping, Shandong, China
- Education: Shandong University; University of the Chinese Academy of Sciences
- Space career

PLAAC astronaut
- Previous occupation: CAS researcher
- Status: Active
- Time in space: 209 days, 20 hours and 27 minutes
- Selection: Chinese Group 3 (2020)
- Missions: Shenzhou 21/22

Chinese name
- Simplified Chinese: 张洪章
- Traditional Chinese: 張洪章
Transcriptions
Standard Mandarin
- Hanyu Pinyin: Zhāng Hóngzhāng

Zhang Hongzhang (Chinese: 张洪章; born April 1986) is a Chinese researcher, payload specialist, and taikonaut selected for the China Manned Space Agency (CMSA). He is set to fly on the Shenzhou 21 mission, his first spaceflight.

== Early life and education ==
Zhang Hongzhang was born in April 1986 in the town of Linchi, in Zouping, Shandong. He has an elder sister named Zhang Hong'en (张洪恩) . He joined the Chinese Communist Party in August 2004. He earned his Bachelor of Engineering in Chemical Engineering from Shandong University in 2008. He subsequently pursued his Ph.D. in Chemical Engineering at the University of the Chinese Academy of Sciences, graduating in 2013 from the Dalian Institute of Chemical Physics (DICP).

== Scientific career ==
Zhang was a researcher and group leader at the Dalian Institute of Chemical Physics, Chinese Academy of Sciences after graduation. His research focused on high-specific-energy battery technologies, including new-system flow batteries, lithium-sulfur batteries, and lithium-ion batteries. He authored over 30 research papers, applied for more than 60 patents, and received several provincial-level awards for technological invention.

== Astronaut career ==
In September 2020, Zhang was selected as one of China's third batch of astronauts, qualifying as a payload specialist. After comprehensive training and evaluation, he was assigned to the Shenzhou 21 mission. As a payload specialist, his primary responsibility aboard the space station is managing scientific experiments and technological application research.

== See also ==
- List of Chinese astronauts
- Tiangong space station
