= Shenzhou 22 =

Chinese spaceflight to the Tiangong space station

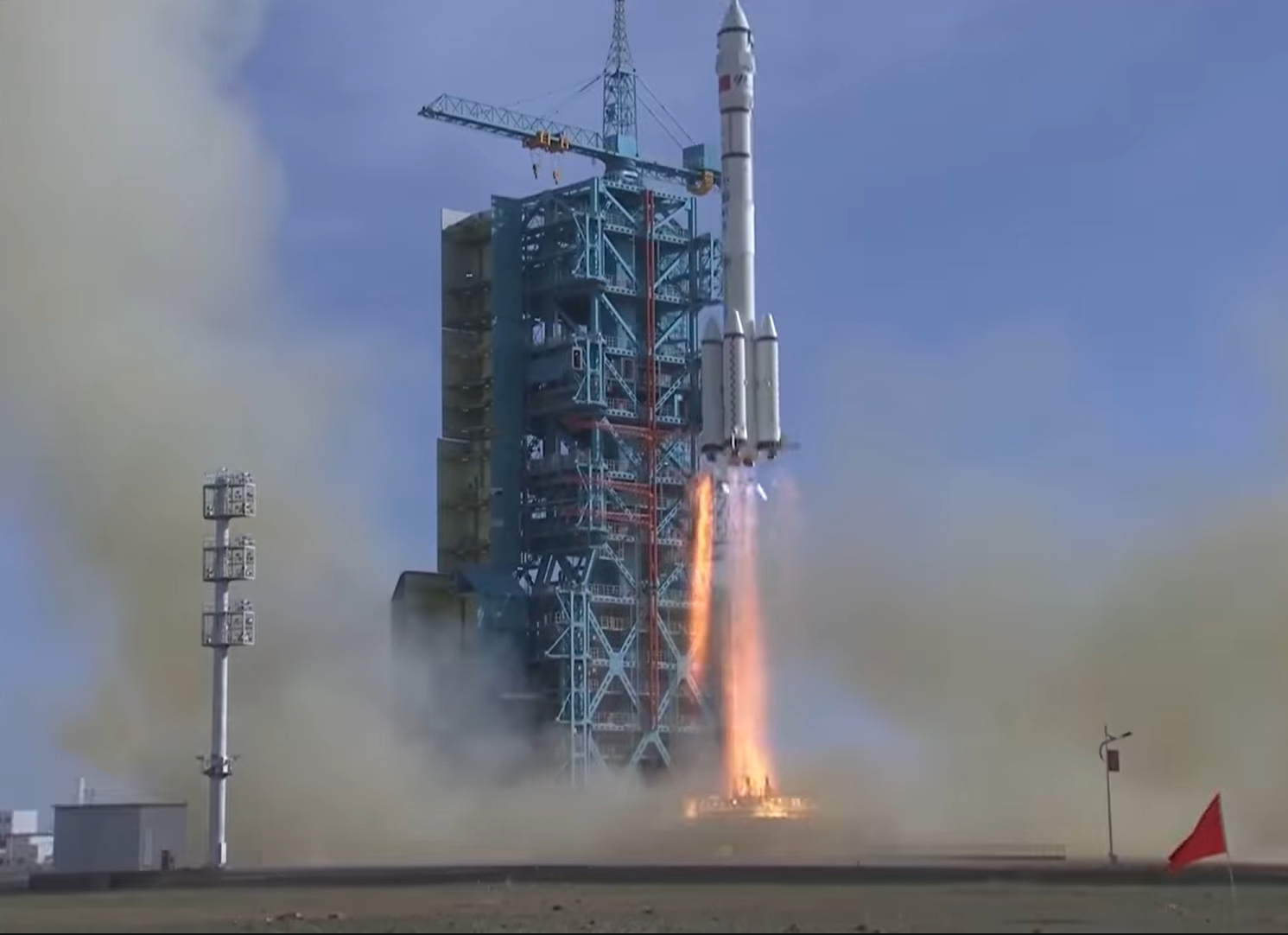
- Launch of Shenzhou 22
- Mission type: Tiangong space station crew transport
- Operator: China Manned Space Agency
- COSPAR ID: 2025-272A
- SATCAT no.: 66645
- Mission duration: Spacecraft: 185 days, 7 hours, 59 minutes; Crew: 209 days, 20 hours, 26 minutes

Spacecraft properties
- Spacecraft type: Shenzhou
- Manufacturer: China Aerospace Science and Technology Corporation

Crew
- Members: 0 up, 3 down
- Launching: None
- Landing: Zhang Lu; Wu Fei; Zhang Hongzhang

Start of mission
- Launch date: 25 November 2025, 04:11:45 UTC (12:11:45 CST)
- Rocket: Long March 2F/G (Y22)
- Launch site: Jiuquan, LA-4/SLS-1
- Contractor: China Academy of Launch Vehicle Technology

End of mission
- Landing date: 29 May 2026, 12:11 UTC
- Landing site: Inner Mongolia (41°38′56″N 100°04′55″E)

Orbital parameters
- Reference system: Geocentric orbit
- Regime: Low Earth orbit
- Perigee altitude: 379 km (235 mi)
- Apogee altitude: 389 km (242 mi)
- Inclination: 41.47°

Docking with Tiangong space station
- Docking port: Tianhe forward
- Docking date: 25 November 2025, 07:50 UTC
- Undocking date: 29 May 2026, 06:44 UTC
- Time docked: 184 days, 22 hours, 54 minutes
- Mission insignia Shenzhou program

Shenzhou 22 (simplified Chinese: 神舟二十二号; traditional Chinese: 神舟二十二號; pinyin: Shénzhōu èrshí'èr hào) was a Chinese spaceflight to the Tiangong space station. The mission was launched uncrewed on 25 November 2025 six months earlier than planned to restore emergency return capability for the station's crew following damage to the docked Shenzhou 20 spacecraft. The vehicle docked with Tiangong the same day and remained in orbit until May 2026 when it returned the Shenzhou 21 crew to Earth.

== Background ==
=== Original mission plan ===
Shenzhou 22 was originally scheduled for launch around April 2026 as the next crew rotation mission after Shenzhou 21. The China Manned Space Agency (CMSA) stated that one astronaut was expected to remain aboard Tiangong for more than a year, a rotation pattern designed to allow a short-duration visit by a Pakistani astronaut—the first international visitor to the station—who would have launched on Shenzhou 23 and returned on Shenzhou 22. Following the reassignment of Shenzhou 22 for the emergency uncrewed launch, this planned exchange is expected to shift to the Shenzhou 23 and 24 missions.

=== Discovery of Shenzhou 20 damage ===
On 5 November 2025, just hours before it was scheduled to be undocked, minor cracks were detected in a window of the docked Shenzhou 20 spacecraft, attributed to a suspected debris impact. The crew's scheduled return was postponed. After additional assessment, mission managers determined that Shenzhou 20 should not be used for reentry. Its three-person crew returned to Earth on 14 November aboard the already-docked Shenzhou 21 spacecraft, six months ahead of schedule.

This left the Shenzhou 21 crew aboard Tiangong without a flightworthy return vehicle for 11 days.

=== Emergency launch decision ===
Under China's human-spaceflight contingency policy—sometimes described as "one launch, one on standby"—the spacecraft and Long March 2F rocket for the next planned mission are kept in a near-ready state at Jiuquan. This posture allowed Shenzhou 22, originally intended for the next crew rotation, to be reassigned for an accelerated uncrewed launch.

The normal test-to-launch process of more than 30 days was shortened to 16 days. CMSA stated that this was achieved through compressed testing schedules and heightened quality-assurance measures.

== Mission ==
A Long March 2F rocket launched Shenzhou 22 uncrewed from the Jiuquan Satellite Launch Center at 04:11:45 UTC (12:11:45 CST) on 25 November 2025. The spacecraft docked with the forward port of the Tianhe module at 07:50 UTC, restoring a return capability for the station crew.

Shenzhou 22 carried food, clothing, and other consumables to replace supplies used by the Shenzhou 20 crew during their extended stay. It also delivered equipment intended to assess whether the cracked window on Shenzhou 20 could be repaired. The off-cycle launch additionally provided an opportunity to send medical supplies, fresh food items, and other perishables for the crew.

The Shenzhou 22 vehicle incorporates several upgrades, including improved instrumentation, updated interfaces, and an optimized return-capsule layout with increased down-mass capacity.

Following the reassignment of Shenzhou 22, a temporary readiness gap exists at Jiuquan. The Long March 2F rocket designated for Shenzhou 23 remained under assembly and testing in Beijing as of late November 2025. That rocket—along with the spacecraft and launch vehicle for Shenzhou 24—will need to be delivered and prepared in order to reestablish the "one launch, one on standby" posture before the Shenzhou 21 crew are scheduled to complete their roughly six-month mission and return to Earth aboard Shenzhou 22 in May 2026.

Position	Launching crew	Landing crew
Commander	None	Zhang Lu, PLAAC; Second spaceflight
Flight engineer	None	Wu Fei, PLAAC; First spaceflight
Payload specialist	None	Zhang Hongzhang, CMSA; First spaceflight
