= Zhang Xiaoguang =

Chinese taikonaut (born 1966)

- 张晓光
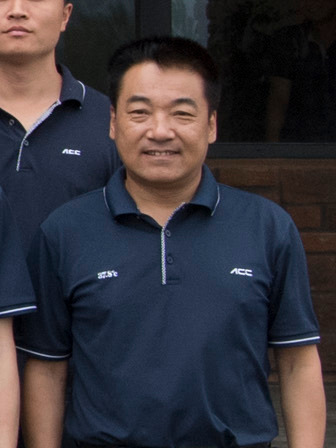
- Born: May 1966 (age 60); Jinzhou, Liaoning
- Space career

PLAAC astronaut
- Previous occupation: PLAAF fighter pilot
- Time in space: 14 days, 14 hours, 29 minutes
- Selection: Chinese Group 1 (1998)
- Missions: Shenzhou 10

Zhang Xiaoguang (simplified Chinese: 张晓光; traditional Chinese: 張曉光; pinyin: Zhāng Xiǎoguāng; born May 1966) is a Chinese military pilot and taikonaut selected as part of the Shenzhou program.

== Biography ==
He was born in May 1966 in Jinzhou, to a family of Manchu ethnicity and was a squadron commander in the People's Liberation Army Air Force when he was selected to be an astronaut in 1998. He had accumulated 1000 flight-hours as of 2004. He was selected as part of the backup crew for the Shenzhou 9 mission. In 2013, he was selected to fly Shenzhou 10, the third spaceflight to the first Chinese space station Tiangong 1.

== Career ==
Shenzhou 10 was launched on 11 June 2013, at 09:38 UTC (17:38 local time) on a Long March 2F rocket. It docked to the Tiangong-1 space station, and the crew spent 12 days on board. Zhang returned to Earth on Wednesday, 26 June 2013 00:07 UTC. Total mission duration was 14 days 14 hours and 29 minutes.

== See also ==
- List of Chinese astronauts
- Chinese space programme
