= Gui Haichao =

Chinese taikonaut (born 1986)

- 桂海潮
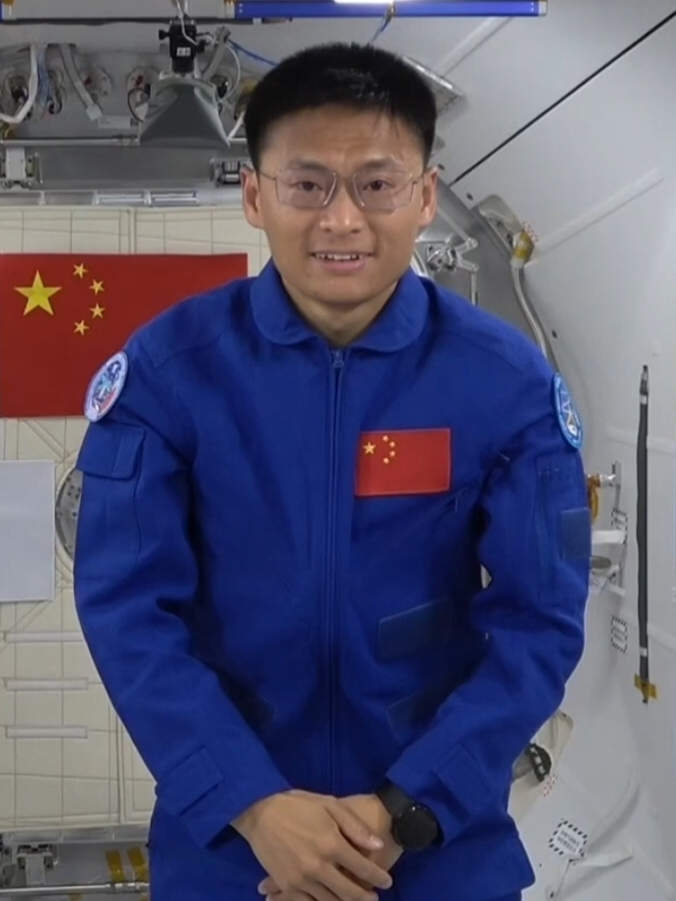
- Born: November 1986 (age 39); Yaoguan Town, Shidian County, Baoshan, Yunnan, China
- Education: Beihang University (B.E., & PhD)
- Occupation: Associate Professor
- Space career

PLAAC astronaut
- Previous occupation: Postdoctoral researcher
- Status: Active
- Time in space: 153 days, 22 hours and 41 minutes
- Selection: Chinese Group 3 (2020)
- Missions: Shenzhou 16

Chinese name
- Simplified Chinese: 桂海潮
- Traditional Chinese: 桂海潮
Transcriptions
Standard Mandarin
- Hanyu Pinyin: Guì Hǎicháo

Gui Haichao (Chinese: 桂海潮; born November 1986) is a Chinese aerospace engineer, researcher and professor selected as part of the Shenzhou program.

Unlike all earlier taikonauts, Gui is China's first civilian astronaut who is not enlisted in the People's Liberation Army Astronaut Corps and is the first payload specialist on mission in China Manned Space Program.

== Early life and education ==
Gui Haichao was born in Baoshan, Yunnan province, China to a family of farmers. He studied at Yaoguan Central Primary School (now the Central School of Yaoguan Town, Shidian County), Yaoguan Middle School (locally known as "Shidian No. 3 Middle School") and Shidian Middle School (Shidian No. 1 Middle School). He received the B.E. and PhD degrees in aerospace engineering from Beihang University, Beijing, China, in 2009 and 2014, respectively.

== Academic career ==
From 2014 to 2017, he was successively a postdoctoral researcher with the Department of Earth and Space Science and Engineering, York University, Toronto, Canada, and the Department of Aerospace Engineering, Ryerson University (Toronto Metropolitan University since 2022), Toronto. Since 2017, he has been an associate professor with the School of Astronautics, Beihang University. His research interests include spacecraft dynamics, nonlinear control, and estimation theory, with an emphasis on applications to space systems.

== Space career ==
When Gui Haichao learned in spring 2018 that the Bureau of Human Spaceflight and the Chinese Astronautics Training Center were looking for civilian payload experts in addition to fighter pilots for the use and expansion phase of the Chinese space station, he got in touch immediately. From 2500 candidates accepted after reviewing the application documents, 18 astronauts were accepted after a three-stage selection process completed in September 2020, including four payload experts, one of them Gui Haichao despite his slight myopia. Of the four payload experts, Gui Haichao was the only one with a university degree. The official swearing-in ceremony for the new selection group took place on 1 October 2020, the Chinese national holiday. Gui Haichao, who had previously joined the Chinese Communist Party in July 2020, was now the first civilian taikonaut.

=== Shenzhou 16 ===
Later he was appointed to be a payload specialist on Shenzhou 16 mission in June 2022, thus becoming the first Chinese civilian of Group 3 in space on 30 May 2023. During the six-month mission, he was responsible for the on-orbit operation of space science experimental payloads.

== Publications (selected) ==
- Hybrid Global Finite-Time Dual-Quaternion Observer and Controller for Velocity-Free Spacecraft Pose Tracking zusammen mit Yong Wang und Wenjie Su, 2020 in Control Systems Technology, IEEE Transactions on PP(99): S. 1–13 doi :10.1109/TCST.2020.3030670
- Observer-Based Fault-Tolerant Spacecraft Attitude Tracking Using Sequential Lyapunov Analyses, 2020
- Dual-Quaternion-Based Spacecraft Pose Tracking with a Global Exponential Velocity Observer zusammen mit Qingqing Dang und Hao Wen, 2019, in Journal of Guidance, Control, and Dynamics 42(9): S. 1–10 doi :10.2514/1.G004302 online
- Adaptive Fault-Tolerant Spacecraft Pose Tracking With Control Allocation zusammen mit Anton H. J. de Ruiter, 2017, in Control Systems Technology, IEEE Transactions on PP(99): S. 1–16 doi :10.1109/TCST.2017.2771374 online
- FTUT Final zusammen mit George Vukovich, 2016 online
- On the attitude stabilization of a rigid spacecraft using two skew control moment gyros zusammen mit Lei Jin, Shijie Xu und Jun Zhang, 2014, in Nonlinear Dynamics 79(3): pp. 2079–2097 doi : 10.1007/s11071-014-1796-0 online

== See also ==
- List of Chinese astronauts
- Chinese space programme
