= Shenzhou 20 =

2025 Chinese crewed spaceflight to the Tiangong space station

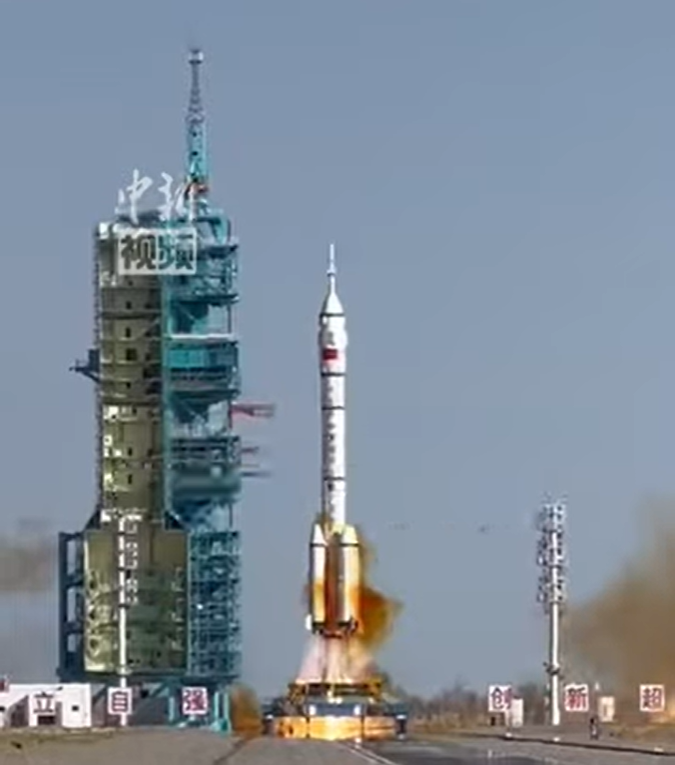
- Launch of Shenzhou 20
- Mission type: Tiangong space station crew transport
- Operator: China Manned Space Agency
- COSPAR ID: 2025-082A
- SATCAT no.: 63632
- Mission duration: Spacecraft: 269 days, 16 hours, 16 minutes; Crew: 203 days, 23 hours, 23 minutes

Spacecraft properties
- Spacecraft type: Shenzhou
- Manufacturer: China Aerospace Science and Technology Corporation

Crew
- Crew size: 3 up, 0 down
- Launching: Chen Dong; Chen Zhongrui; Wang Jie
- Landing: None
- EVAs: 4
- EVA duration: 27 hours, 33 minutes

Start of mission
- Launch date: 24 April 2025, 09:17:31 UTC (17:17:31 CST)
- Rocket: Long March 2F/G (Y20)
- Launch site: Jiuquan, LA-4/SLS-1
- Contractor: China Academy of Launch Vehicle Technology

End of mission
- Landing date: 19 January 2026, 01:34 UTC
- Landing site: Inner Mongolia (41°39′13″N 100°45′13″E)

Orbital parameters
- Reference system: Geocentric orbit
- Regime: Low Earth orbit
- Perigee altitude: 379 km (235 mi)
- Apogee altitude: 389 km (242 mi)
- Inclination: 41.47°

Docking with Tiangong space station
- Docking port: Tianhe nadir
- Docking date: 24 April 2025, 15:49 UTC
- Undocking date: 18 January 2026, 16:23 UTC
- Time docked: 269 days, 34 minutes
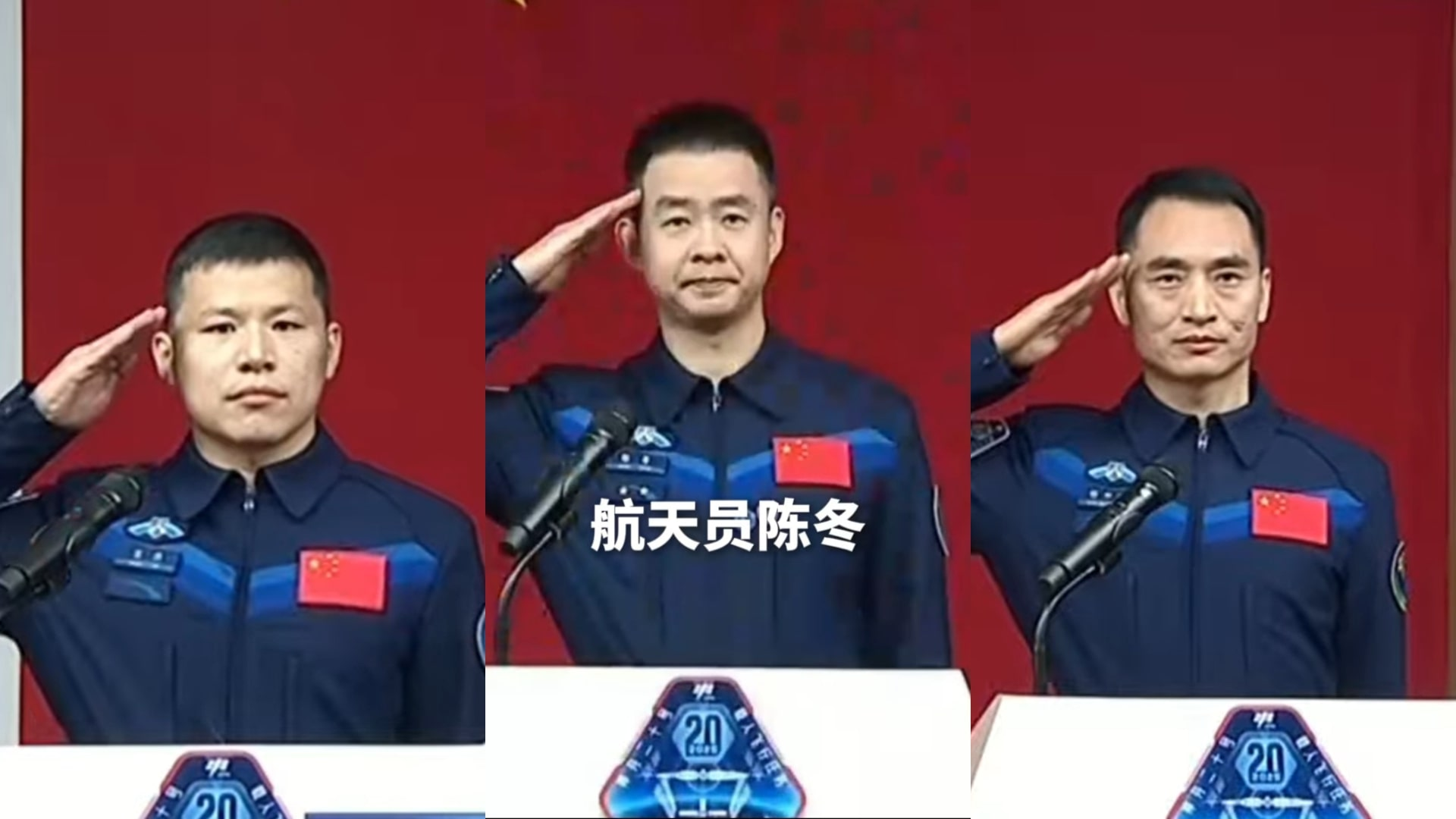
- Mission insignia From left: Wang Jie, Chen Dong and Chen Zhongrui Shenzhou program

Shenzhou 20 (simplified Chinese: 神舟二十号; traditional Chinese: 神舟二十號; pinyin: Shénzhōu èrshí hào) was a Chinese spaceflight mission to the Tiangong space station launched on 24 April 2025. It carried three taikonauts on board a Shenzhou spacecraft.

Shenzhou 20 was expected to return to Earth in early November 2025 after the arrival of the Shenzhou 21 crew. However, due to suspected space debris damage to the spacecraft, the Shenzhou 20 crew returned to Earth on 14 November using the Shenzhou 21 spacecraft instead. The Shenzhou 20 spacecraft returned to Earth uncrewed on 19 January 2026.

The mission was the 15th crewed Chinese spaceflight and the 20th flight overall of the Shenzhou program.

== Background ==
Shenzhou 20 was launched on 24 April 2025, prior to the end of the previous mission, Shenzhou 19. It was the ninth flight to the Tiangong space station and was planned to last approximately six months, departing following the arrival of the Shenzhou 21 crew in late 2025.

== Mission ==
The mission was launched from Jiuquan Satellite Launch Center on board a Long March 2F rocket. The Shenzhou spacecraft docked with the nadir docking port on the Tianhe core module of the station, where the crew entered to take over operations from the departing crew of Shenzhou-19.

The Tianzhou 9 cargo ship docked with the Tiangong station in October during a planned resupply mission.

On 31 October 2025, Shenzhou 21 arrived at the space station in preparation for the return of Shenzhou 20. Members of both crews were pictured eating "barbecued" chicken wings aboard the station in a video shared by Chinese state media.

=== Space debris incident ===
On 5 November 2025, just hours before it was scheduled to undock, minor cracks were detected in a window of the docked Shenzhou 20 spacecraft, attributed to a suspected debris impact. Taikonauts Chen Dong and Wang Jie found a small triangular crack on the outer pane of the re-entry capsule window. Further examination with a small microscope revealed long, thin cracks in the windowpane. As a precaution, the crew's scheduled return was postponed, and further assessment determined that Shenzhou 20 should not be used for reentry. Its three-person crew returned to Earth on 14 November aboard the already-docked Shenzhou 21 spacecraft.

On 25 November, Shenzhou 22 launched uncrewed—six months earlier than planned—and docked with Tiangong later the same day. Its arrival restored a flightworthy return vehicle for the station crew. It also meant that both docking ports were in use on the space station and Shenzhou 20 needed to be removed before Shenzhou 23 could dock in 2026.

Shenzhou 22 carried food, clothing, and other consumables to replace supplies used by the crew during the extended Shenzhou 20 mission. It also delivered equipment intended to assess whether the cracked window on Shenzhou 20 could be repaired.

CMSA stated that Shenzhou 20 would remain in orbit to support follow-on experiments related to the damage event.

In December 2025, CMSA confirmed that Shenzhou 20 would return to Earth uncrewed after repair work using equipment delivered by Shenzhou 22. On 9 December, Shenzhou 21 astronauts Wu Fei and Zhang Lu conducted an 8-hour spacewalk that inspected the damage to the Shenzhou 20 spacecraft.

Shenzhou 20 undocked on 18 January 2026 and landed in the deserts of Inner Mongolia on 19 January at 01:34 UTC. The spacecraft was uncrewed but carried cargo from Tiangong back to Earth.

== Crew ==
In keeping with China's past practice, the names of the crew were not announced until the day before launch. The mission was commanded by Chen Dong, who previously flew on Shenzhou 11—the only crewed mission to the Tiangong-2 space laboratory in 2016—and later commanded Shenzhou 14 to the Tiangong space station in 2022. He will take his second flight as commander taking responsibility for the whole mission. He was joined by operator Chen Zhongrui, a fighter pilot with the People's Liberation Army Air Force, he is tasked with completing mission operations and Wang Jie, an engineer with the China Academy of Space Technology. He will maintain the space station platform keeping care of the sub systems.

Position	Launching crew	Landing crew
Commander	Chen Dong, PLAAC; Third spaceflight	None
Operator	Chen Zhongrui, PLAAC; First spaceflight	None
Flight engineer	Wang Jie, PLAAC; First spaceflight	None

== See also ==
- Soyuz MS-22 – Russian crewed spacecraft also hit by space debris and landed uncrewed.
