= Liu Wang =

Chinese taikonaut (born 1969)

- 刘旺
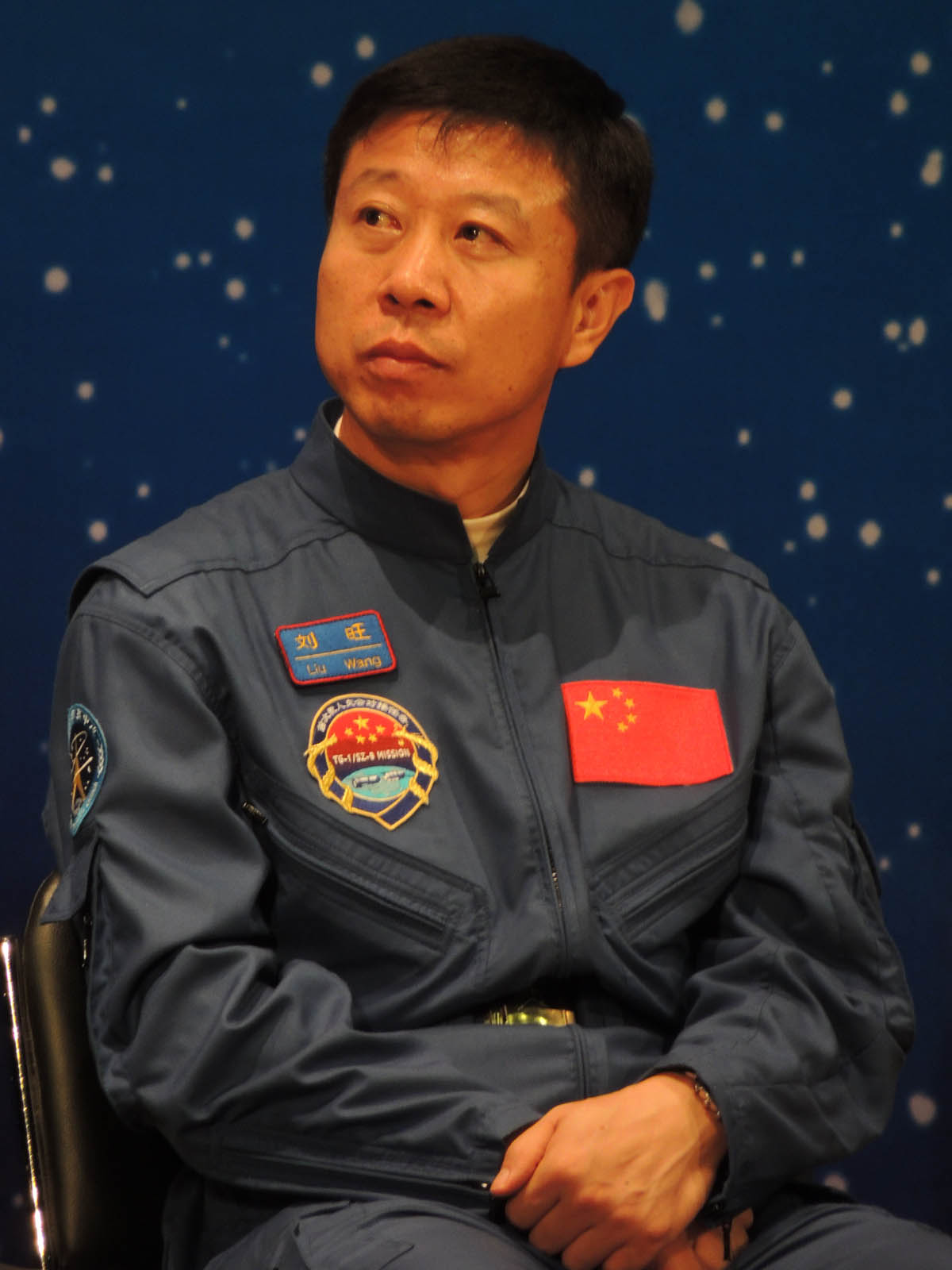
- Wang in 2012
- Born: March 25, 1969 (age 57); Pingyao County, Shanxi, People's Republic of China
- Occupation: Pilot
- Space career

PLAAC astronaut
- Rank: Major General, PLASSF
- Time in space: 12 days, 15 hours and 25 minutes
- Selection: Chinese Group 1 (1998)
- Missions: Shenzhou 9

Liu Wang (simplified Chinese: 刘旺; traditional Chinese: 劉旺; pinyin: Liú Wàng, born 25 March 1969) is a Chinese pilot selected as part of the Shenzhou program.

== Early life ==
He was born in a rural village in the Pingyao County, Shanxi province of China on March 25, 1969 to a family of farmers. He enrolled at the PLA Air Force Aviation University in 1988 and studied to be a fighter pilot.

== Air Force career ==
Then, he became a fighter pilot in the People's Liberation Army Air Force. He was selected to be an astronaut in 1998.

== Spaceflight career ==
Liu Wang was selected to be part of the crew of Shenzhou 9, the first crewed mission to the first Chinese space station, Tiangong 1. Also on the mission is Jing Haipeng, the first Chinese repeat space traveller, and the first Chinese female astronaut, Liu Yang.

== See also ==
- List of Chinese astronauts
- Chinese space programme
