= Wu Fei (taikonaut) =

Chinese taikonaut (born 1993)

- 武飞
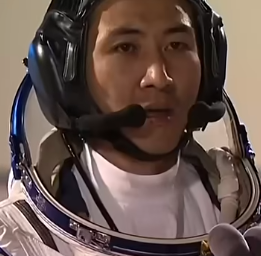
- Born: October 1993 (age 32–33); Baotou, Inner Mongolia, China
- Education: Beijing University of Aeronautics and Astronautics
- Space career

PLAAC astronaut
- Previous occupation: CASC engineer
- Status: Active
- Rank: Major
- Time in space: 209 days, 20 hours and 27 minutes
- Selection: Chinese Group 3 (2020)
- Total EVAs: 1
- Total EVA time: 8 hours
- Missions: Shenzhou 21/22

Chinese name
- Simplified Chinese: 武飞
- Traditional Chinese: 武飛
Transcriptions
Standard Mandarin
- Hanyu Pinyin: Wǔ Fēi

Wu Fei (Chinese: 武飞; born October 1993) is a Chinese taikonaut and a member of the People's Liberation Army Astronaut Corps, holding the rank of major. He is the youngest Chinese astronaut to execute a space mission as part of the Shenzhou 21 crew.

== Biography ==
Born in October 1993 in Baotou, Inner Mongolia, Wu graduated from Beijing University of Aeronautics and Astronautics (BUAA), where he earned his bachelor's degree in 2014 and a master's degree in 2017, specializing in aircraft design and life-support systems.

Wu joined the Chinese Communist Party (CCP) in October 2015, and enlisted in the People's Liberation Army (PLA) in January 2021. Wu previously worked as an engineer at China Aerospace Science and Technology Corporation (CASC).

== Space career ==
In September 2020, he was selected as one of China's third batch of astronauts, specializing as a flight engineer. After comprehensive training and evaluation, he was chosen for the Shenzhou 21 mission, his first spaceflight.

The Shenzhou 21 mission launched on October 31, 2025. As the flight engineer, Wu is responsible for the maintenance and management of the space station platform and its equipment. On 9 December, Wu conducted an 8-hour spacewalk that inspected space debris damage to the Shenzhou 20 spacecraft, also becoming China's youngest spacewalker.

== See also ==
- List of Chinese astronauts
- Tiangong space station
