= Li Guangsu =

Chinese astronaut (born 1987)

- 李广苏
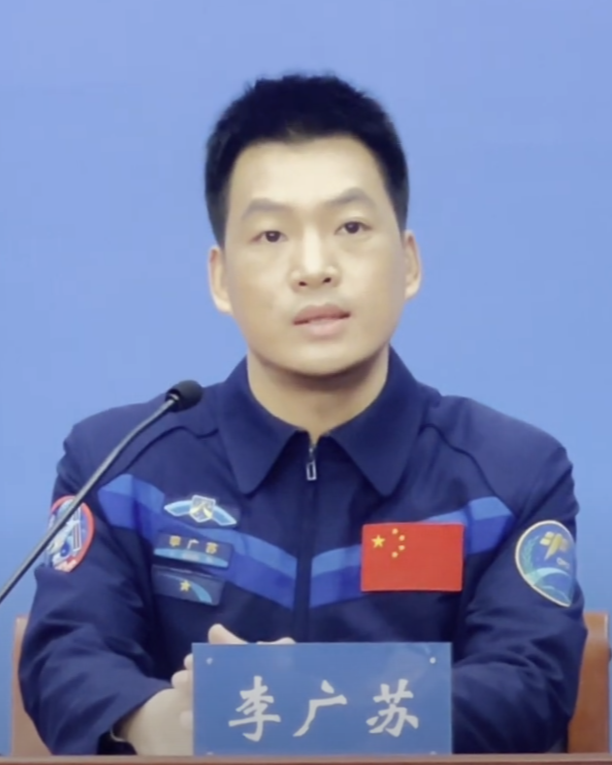
- Li in 2025
- Born: July 1987 (age 39); Pei County, Jiangsu
- Education: PLA Air Force Aviation University
- Space career

PLAAC astronaut
- Previous occupation: Fighter pilot, PLAAF
- Status: Active
- Rank: Lieutenant colonel, PLAAF
- Time in space: 192 days, 4 hours and 25 minutes
- Selection: Chinese Group 3 (2020)
- Total EVAs: 1
- Total EVA time: 8 hours, 23 minutes
- Missions: Shenzhou 18

Chinese name
- Simplified Chinese: 李广苏
- Traditional Chinese: 李廣蘇
Transcriptions
Standard Mandarin
- Hanyu Pinyin: Lǐ Guǎngsū

Li Guangsu (Chinese: 李广苏; born July 1987) is a Chinese fighter pilot and People's Liberation Army Astronaut Corps (PLAAC) taikonaut.

== Biography ==
Li was born in the town of Huzhai, Pei County, Jiangsu, in July 1987, to Li Houlin (李厚林), and Xu Guilan (徐桂兰). He has an older sister and a younger brother.

He applied for recruitment of Chinese People's Liberation Army Air Force Aviation University in 2005. He graduated from the People's Liberation Army Air Force Aviation University. He was enlisted in the People's Liberation Army (PLA) in September 2006, and joined the Chinese Communist Party (CCP) in June 2011.

Guangsu once served as the lieutenant colonel of a flying brigade of the Air Force Aviation Brigade and was first class pilot in the People's Liberation Army Air Force. He participated in the astronaut selection in May 2018 and was selected as a fourth grade astronaut into the People's Liberation Army Astronaut Corps in September 2020.

In 2024, he was selected as the System Operator of Shenzhou 18, becoming the second astronaut from Pei County after Zhu Yangzhu. Shenzhou 18 launched on 24 April 2024, docking successfully with Tiangong on the same day, and landed on 3 November 2024 after 192 days in space.

== See also ==
- List of Chinese astronauts
- Tiangong space station
