= Li Cong (taikonaut) =

Chinese astronaut (born 1989)

- 李聪
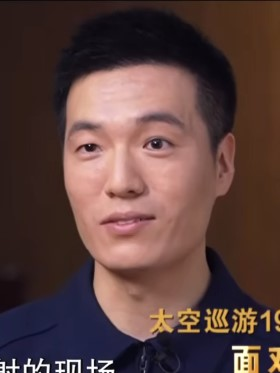
- Born: October 1989 (age 36–37); Handan, Hebei, China
- Education: PLA Air Force Aviation University
- Space career

PLAAC astronaut
- Previous occupation: Fighter pilot, PLAAF
- Status: Active
- Rank: Lieutenant colonel, PLAAF
- Time in space: 192 days, 4 hours and 25 minutes
- Selection: Chinese Group 3 (2020)
- Missions: Shenzhou 18

Chinese name
- Simplified Chinese: 李聪
- Traditional Chinese: 李聰
Transcriptions
Standard Mandarin
- Hanyu Pinyin: Lǐ Cōng

Li Cong (Chinese: 李聪; born October 1989) is a Chinese fighter pilot and People's Liberation Army Astronaut Corps (PLAAC) taikonaut. Li launched on the Shenzhou 18 mission to the Tiangong space station.

== Biography ==
Li Cong was born in a rural village in Fengfeng Mining District in Handan, Hebei in October 1989. His family moved to the mining area when he was 5 years old.

He applied for recruitment of Air Force Aviation University when he was in third year of high school. He graduated from the People's Liberation Army Air Force Aviation University. He was enlisted in the People's Liberation Army (PLA) in September 2009, and joined the Chinese Communist Party (CCP) in June 2011.

Li once served as the lieutenant colonel of a flying brigade of the Air Force Aviation Brigade and was second class pilot in the People's Liberation Army Air Force. He participated in the astronaut selection in May 2018 and was selected as a fourth grade astronaut into the People's Liberation Army Astronaut Corps in September 2020.

In 2024, he was selected as the Operator of Shenzhou 18.

== See also ==
- List of Chinese astronauts
- Chinese space programme
