= Chen Dong (taikonaut) =

Chinese fighter pilot and taikonaut (born 1978)

- 陈冬
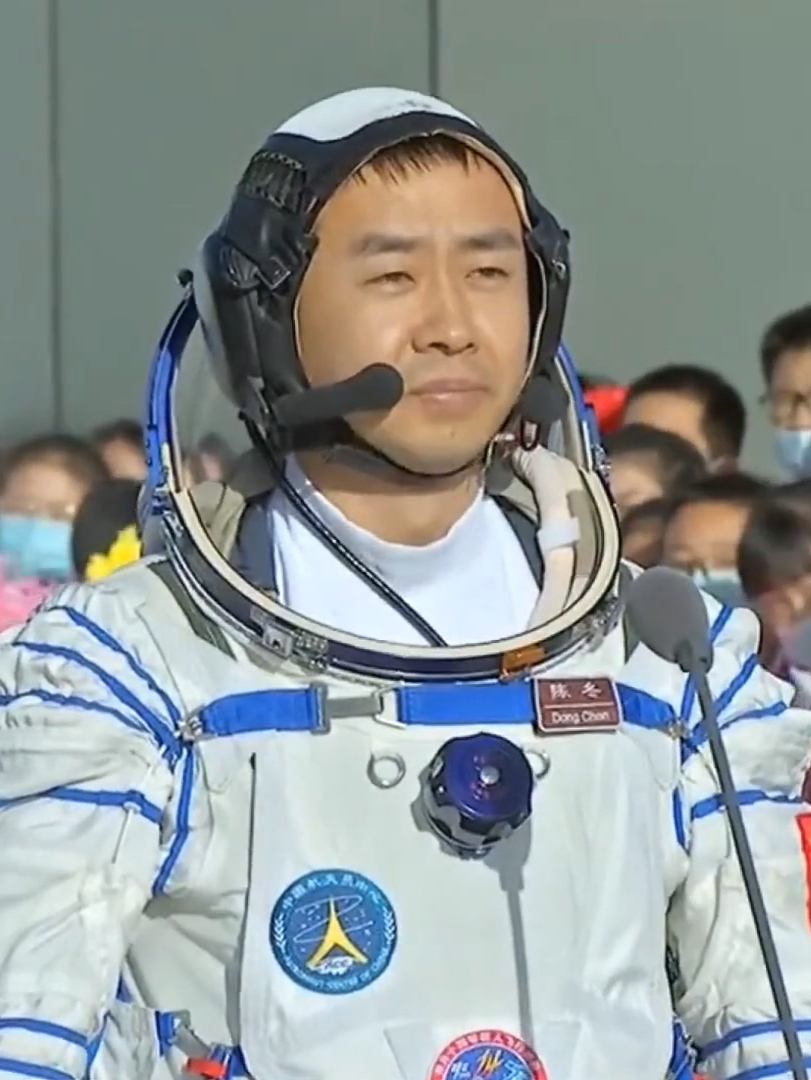
- Born: 12 December 1978 (age 47); Luoyang, Henan, China
- Space career

PLAAC astronaut
- Current occupation: Astronaut
- Previous occupation: Fighter pilot
- Status: Active
- Rank: Major general, People's Liberation Army Aerospace Force
- Time in space: 418 days, 15 hours, 17 minutes
- Selection: Chinese Group 2 (2010)
- Total EVAs: 6
- Total EVA time: 37 hours, 4 minutes
- Missions: Shenzhou 11; Shenzhou 14; Shenzhou 20/21

Chinese name
- Simplified Chinese: 陈冬
- Traditional Chinese: 陳冬
Transcriptions
Standard Mandarin
- Hanyu Pinyin: Chén Dōng

Chen Dong (simplified Chinese: 陈冬; traditional Chinese: 陳冬; pinyin: Chén Dōng; born 12 December 1978) is a Chinese fighter pilot and taikonaut selected as part of the Shenzhou program. A fighter pilot in the People's Liberation Army Air Force (PLAAF), he was selected to be a CNSA taikonaut in 2010.

A veteran of the Shenzhou 11, Shenzhou 14 and Shenzhou 20 missions to the Tiangong space station, in October 2025, he set a new record for longest cumulative stay in space by a Chinese astronaut.

== Early life and education ==
Chen was born in Luoyang, Henan, on 12 December 1978 from a working-class family. Both his father Chen Shulin (陈树林) and mother Huang Yan (黄焱) were workers at Luoyang Copper Processing Group Material Adjustment Co., Ltd. (formerly Luoyang Copper Processing Factory), and he has an elder brother named Chen Bo (陈波). He studied at Luoyang Copper Processing Factory High School (now Jinghua Campus of Luoyang Second High School).

He was a graduate of the PLAAF Changchun Flight Academy (now PLAAF Aviation University), and holds a master's degree in engineering from Xi'an Jiaotong University. He joined the Chinese Communist Party in April 1999.

== Military career ==
He joined the PLAAF in August 1997, eventually achieving the rank of Colonel. He was promoted to Senior Colonel in 2022.

=== Astronaut career ===
Chen was selected for the second batch for Chinese astronauts in 2009 when he was a combat aircraft pilot. He was interviewed by Yang Liwei.

==== Shenzhou 11 ====
He was selected to fly on the Shenzhou 11 mission in October 2016 with astronaut Jing Haipeng. The two underwent more than 3,000 hours of training before the launch of the spacecraft. On 17 October 2016 at 07:30 local time (23:30 GMT on 16 October), Chen lifted off with Shenzhou 11 for a 33-day space mission to the Tiangong-2 space station as his first spaceflight, launched from the Jiuquan Satellite Launch Center using a Long March 2F launch rocket. The crew landed successfully after the 33 day mission on 18 November 2016, marking China's longest crewed space flight to date. The reentry module of the Shenzhou-11 spacecraft landed in Inner Mongolia around 2.15 p.m (China time) after detaching from the space lab on 17 November.

==== Shenzhou 14 ====
On June 5, 2022, Chen launched aboard Shenzhou 14 to the Tiangong space station as commander for a 6-month stay. He completed three spacewalks during the mission.

==== Shenzhou 20 ====
On April 24, 2025, Chen Dong launched on the Shenzhou 20 mission to the Tiangong space station, where he served as commander. With 6 spacewalks for a total time of 37 hours 4 minutes, he is only second to Zhang Lu for most spacewalks and most time spent outside a spacecraft among the Chinese.

== Awards ==
For his achievements on the Shenzhou 11 mission, Chen was awarded the Spaceflight Merit Medal (Third Class) along with the honorary title of "hero astronaut" on 26 December 2016 by the Central Military Commission.

On 21 January 2026, the CPC Central Committee, the State Council and the Central Military Commission decided to award Chen the Spaceflight Merit Medal (First Class).

On 22 April 2026, he was attending a ceremony welcoming back the remains of volunteer martyrs who died in the Korean War, in an interview he was spotted to have the rank of a major general.

== Personal life ==
Chen married Wang Xiaoyan (汪晓燕) in 2005 and has twin sons.

== See also ==
- List of Chinese astronauts
- Chinese space programme
