= Shenzhou 21 =

2025 Chinese crewed spaceflight

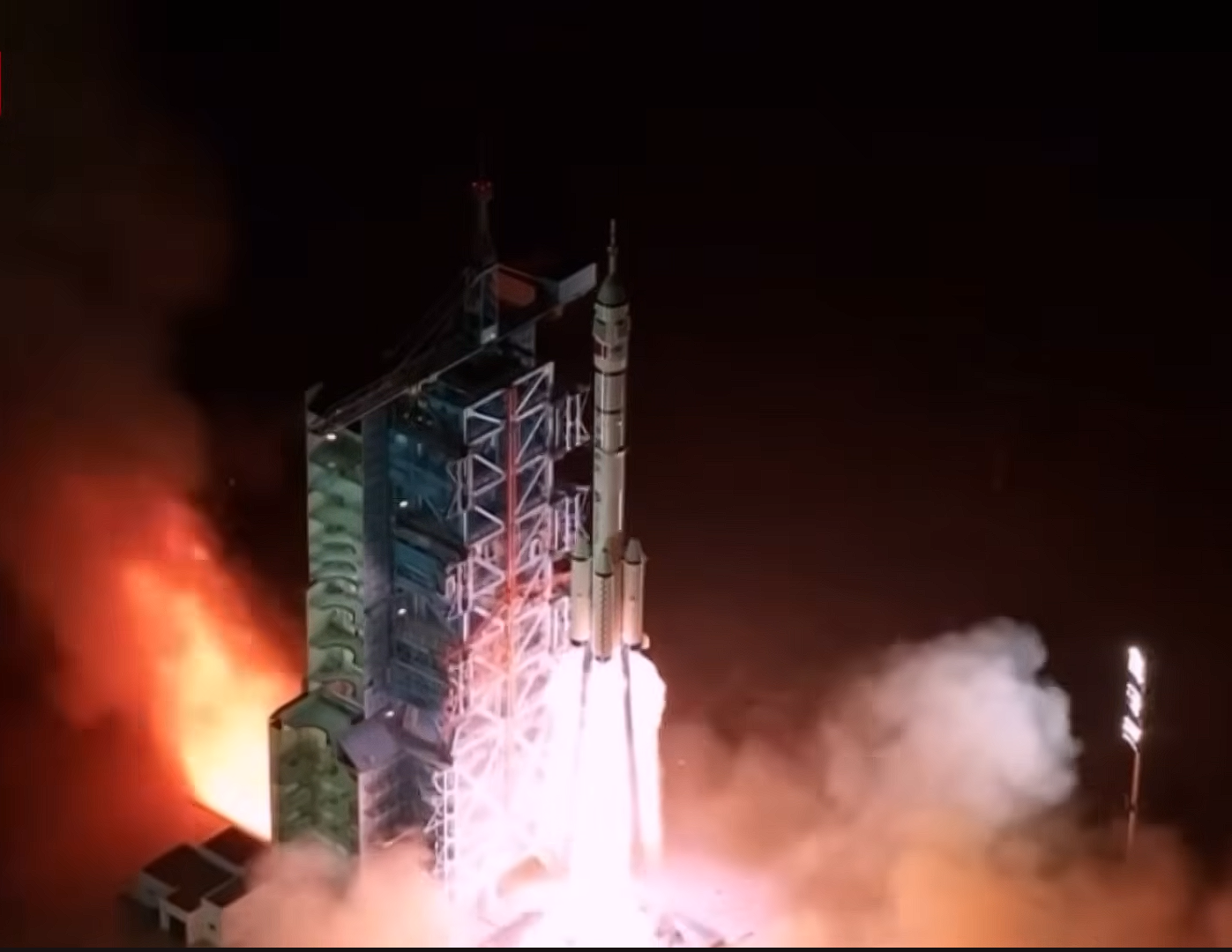
- Liftoff of Shenzhou 21
- Mission type: Tiangong space station crew transport
- Operator: China Manned Space Agency
- COSPAR ID: 2025-246A
- SATCAT no.: 66263
- Mission duration: Spacecraft: 13 days, 16 hours, 55 minutes; Launching crew: 209 days, 20 hours, 26 minutes

Spacecraft properties
- Spacecraft type: Shenzhou
- Manufacturer: China Aerospace Science and Technology Corporation

Crew
- Crew size: 3
- Launching: Zhang Lu; Wu Fei; Zhang Hongzhang
- Landing: Chen Dong; Chen Zhongrui; Wang Jie
- EVAs: 3
- EVA duration: 20 hours, 52 minutes

Start of mission
- Launch date: 31 October 2025, 15:44:46 UTC (23:44:46 CST)
- Rocket: Long March 2F/G (Y21)
- Launch site: Jiuquan, LA-4/SLS-1
- Contractor: China Academy of Launch Vehicle Technology

End of mission
- Landing date: 14 November 2025, 08:40:31 UTC
- Landing site: Inner Mongolia (41°40′06″N 100°02′58″E)

Orbital parameters
- Reference system: Geocentric orbit
- Regime: Low Earth orbit
- Perigee altitude: 379 km (235 mi)
- Apogee altitude: 389 km (242 mi)
- Inclination: 41.47°

Docking with Tiangong space station
- Docking port: Tianhe forward
- Docking date: 31 October 2025, 19:22 UTC
- Undocking date: 14 November 2025, 03:14 UTC
- Time docked: 13 days, 7 hours, 52 minutes
- Mission insignia Shenzhou program

Shenzhou 21 (simplified Chinese: 神舟二十一号; traditional Chinese: 神舟二十一號; pinyin: Shénzhōu èrshíyī hào) was a Chinese spaceflight to the Tiangong space station, launched on 31 October 2025. It carried three taikonauts on board a Shenzhou spacecraft. The mission was the 16th crewed Chinese spaceflight and the 21st flight overall of the Shenzhou program. The flight marked the tenth crew rotation to the Tiangong space station, which has been continuously occupied since June 2022.

The Shenzhou 21 spacecraft was originally scheduled to complete a six-month rotation at Tiangong. However, due to suspected space debris damage to the Shenzhou 20 spacecraft, Shenzhou 21 returned to Earth early after only a two-week stay, carrying the Shenzhou 20 crew. The Shenzhou 21 mission crew returned to Earth on the Shenzhou 22 spacecraft on 29 May 2026.

== Mission ==
=== Launch and docking ===
Shenzhou 21 was launched aboard a Long March 2F rocket from Launch Area 4 at the Jiuquan Satellite Launch Center on 31 October 2025 at 15:44:46 UTC (23:44:46 CST, local time at the launch site).

Prior to launch, the taikonauts took part in a formal send-off ceremony at the Jiuquan Astronaut Systems Engineering Office—a tradition dating to Shenzhou 5 in 2003—before traveling by motorcade to the pad for spacecraft ingress about 2 hours, 20 minutes before liftoff.

After orbital insertion, Shenzhou 21 conducted a fast automated rendezvous and docking with the forward port of Tiangong's Tianhe core module at 19:22 UTC, taking approximately three and a half hours to reach the station. This was three hours faster than the Shenzhou 20 docking sequence and significantly faster than the two days trip prior to Shenzhou 14. Once docked to Tianhe's forward port, the crew entered the station and took over operations from the departing Shenzhou 20 crew of Chen Dong, Chen Zhongrui, and Wang Jie, who had been in orbit since April 2025.

=== Early return of spacecraft ===
The two crews were expected to overlap for about one week before Shenzhou 20's scheduled return to Earth in early November 2025. However, the return of the Shenzhou 20 spacecraft was delayed until January 2026 due to suspected damage from space debris.

On 11 November, the Shenzhou 21 spacecraft returned to Earth early after a two-week stay at the station, carrying the crew of Shenzhou 20. The Shenzhou 21 crew remained on board Tiangong, and on 25 November, the Shenzhou 22 spacecraft was flown uncrewed to the space station to serve as their return vehicle.

On 9 December, Wu Fei and Zhang Lu conducted an 8-hour spacewalk that inspected the damage to the Shenzhou 20 spacecraft.

=== Objectives ===
During their six-month stay, the Shenzhou 21 crew conducted 27 scientific experiments, including China's first study of rodent mammals in orbit. Four mice accompanied the crew to examine the effects of microgravity and confined living conditions; they returned to Earth aboard Shenzhou 20. One of the female mice that returned gave birth to nine healthy pups on 10 December 2025, demonstrating that short-term spaceflight did not damage mammalian reproduction. Other experiments focused on new-energy research and biological adaptation in microgravity.

The crew received the Tianzhou 10 cargo spacecraft and handed the station over to the Shenzhou 23 mission in May 2026. Zhang Lu and Wu Fei were the first taikonauts to utilize upgraded Feitian space suits with a higher operational lifespan, delivered to the station by Tianzhou 9.

== Crew ==
The crew for the Shenzhou 21 mission was selected in February 2025, but, in keeping with China's past practice, their names were not announced until the day before the launch. The mission was commanded by Zhang Lu, who previously flew on Shenzhou 15 in 2022–23. He was joined by flight engineer Wu Fei, a researcher at the China Academy of Space Technology, and Zhang Hongzhang, a payload specialist from the Dalian Institute of Chemical Physics. Wu, aged 32 at launch, became the youngest taikonaut to fly in space. Both Wu and Zhang Hongzhang were selected in 2020 as part of China's third group of taikonauts.

Position	Launching crew	Landing crew
Commander	Zhang Lu, PLAAC; Second spaceflight	Chen Dong, PLAAC; Third spaceflight
Flight engineer / Operator	Wu Fei, PLAAC; First spaceflight	Chen Zhongrui, PLAAC; First spaceflight
Payload specialist / Flight engineer	Zhang Hongzhang, CMSA; First spaceflight	Wang Jie, PLAAC; First spaceflight
