= Chen Zhongrui =

Chinese astronaut (born 1984)

- 陈中瑞
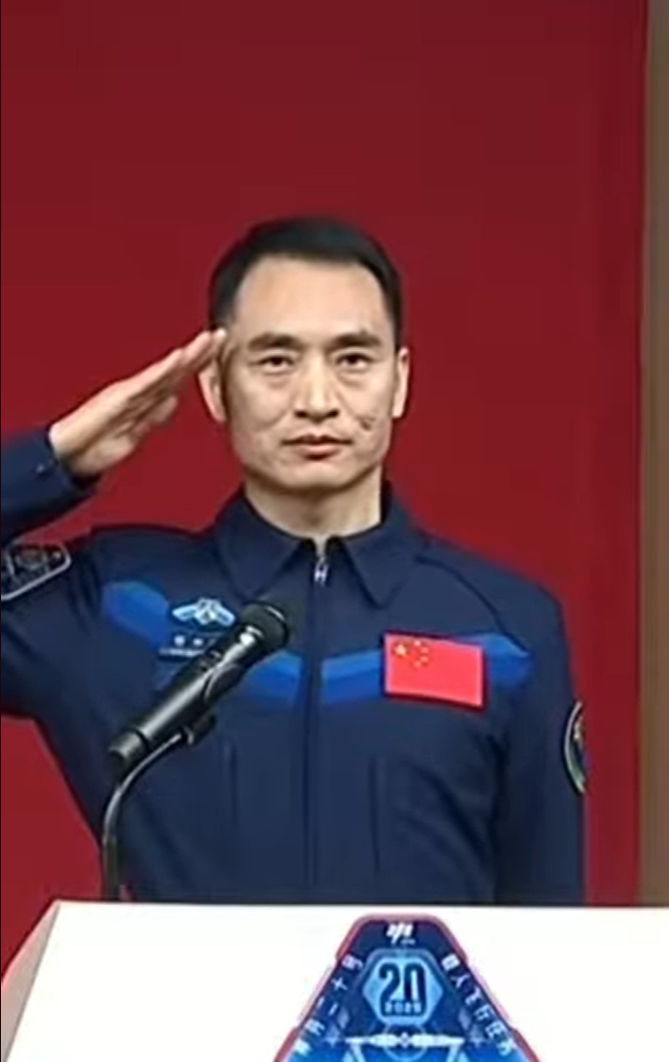
- Born: October 1984 (age 41–42); Puyang, Henan, China
- Space career

PLAAC astronaut
- Previous occupation: People's Liberation Army Air Force fighter pilot
- Status: Active
- Rank: Lieutenant colonel, People's Liberation Army Ground Force
- Time in space: 203 days, 23 hours and 23 minutes
- Selection: Chinese Group 3 (2020)
- Total EVAs: 1
- Total EVA time: 6 hours, 29 minutes
- Missions: Shenzhou 20/21

Chen Zhongrui (Chinese: 陈中瑞; born October 1984) is a Chinese People's Liberation Army Astronaut Corps (PLAAC) taikonaut. In 2025, he spent six months at the Tiangong space station as a member of the Shenzhou 20 mission.

== Biography ==
Born in Chendazhao Village, Hua County, Henan Province in October 1984. He has loved machinery since childhood and once dreamed of becoming a tractor driver. When he graduated from junior high school, he began to prepare for the Air Force pilot selection test. After passing the test, he entered the Air Force Changchun Flight Academy and was the first batch of flight trainees to fly solo. He began to dream of becoming an astronaut.

== Astronaut career ==
In 2018, he participated in the third batch of astronaut selection and was selected in September 2020.

On April 24, 2025, Chen launched on the Shenzhou 20 mission to the Tiangong space station, where he is currently serving as operator.

== See also ==
- List of Chinese astronauts
- Tiangong space station
