= Zhang Lu (taikonaut) =

Chinese taikonaut (born 1976)

- 张陆
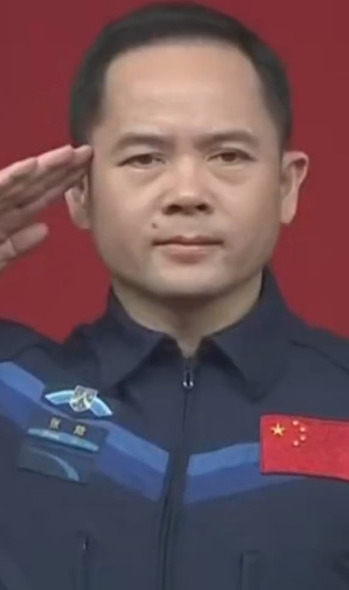
- Zhang in November 2022
- Born: November 1976 (age 49); Hanshou County, Hunan, China
- Education: PLA Air Force Aviation University
- Space career

PLAAC astronaut
- Previous occupation: Fighter pilot, People's Liberation Army Air Force
- Status: Active
- Rank: Senior colonel, People's Liberation Army Strategic Support Force
- Time in space: 396 days, 3 hours, and 50 minutes
- Selection: Chinese Group 2 (2010)
- Total EVAs: 7
- Total EVA time: 50 hours, 48 minutes
- Missions: Shenzhou 15; Shenzhou 21/22
- Children: 1

Chinese name
- Simplified Chinese: 张陆
- Traditional Chinese: 張陸
Transcriptions
Standard Mandarin
- Hanyu Pinyin: Zhāng Lù

Zhang Lu (Chinese: 张陆; born November 1976) is a Chinese astronaut in the Shenzhou program. He enlisted in the People's Liberation Army (PLA) in August 1999, and joined the Chinese Communist Party (CCP) in April 1999.

Zhang served as system operator on the 185-day Shenzhou 15 mission to the Tiangong space station in 2022-2023, and recently served as the commander of the Shenzhou 21 mission, which launched in October 2025. With 7 spacewalks for a total time of 47 hours 47 minutes, he is the current Chinese record holder for most spacewalks and most time spent outside a spacecraft, and ranks 19th globally.

== Biography ==
Zhang was born into a fisherman's family in Hanshou County, Hunan province, China, in November 1976. He attended Chengguan No. 4 Primary School (城关四小), Zhanlepin Middle School (詹乐贫中学) and Hanshou County No. 1 High School (汉寿一中). In 1981, at the age of 5, his family relocated to downtown Hanshou County, where they engaged in freshwater aquaculture. Due to hard work and thrift, his family became a 10,000-Yuan-Household (万元户) in the early days of the reform and opening up. In his early teens, he developed taste for singing.

After graduating from the current PLA Air Force Aviation University in 2000, he became a fighter pilot in the People's Liberation Army Air Force, and was selected to be an astronaut in May 2010.

== Personal life ==
Zhang married in 2003 and has a daughter.

== See also ==
- List of Chinese astronauts
- Chinese space programme
