= Bohu laser facility =

Military station in Xinjiang, China

- Bosten Lake, Bohu County, Xinjiang, China
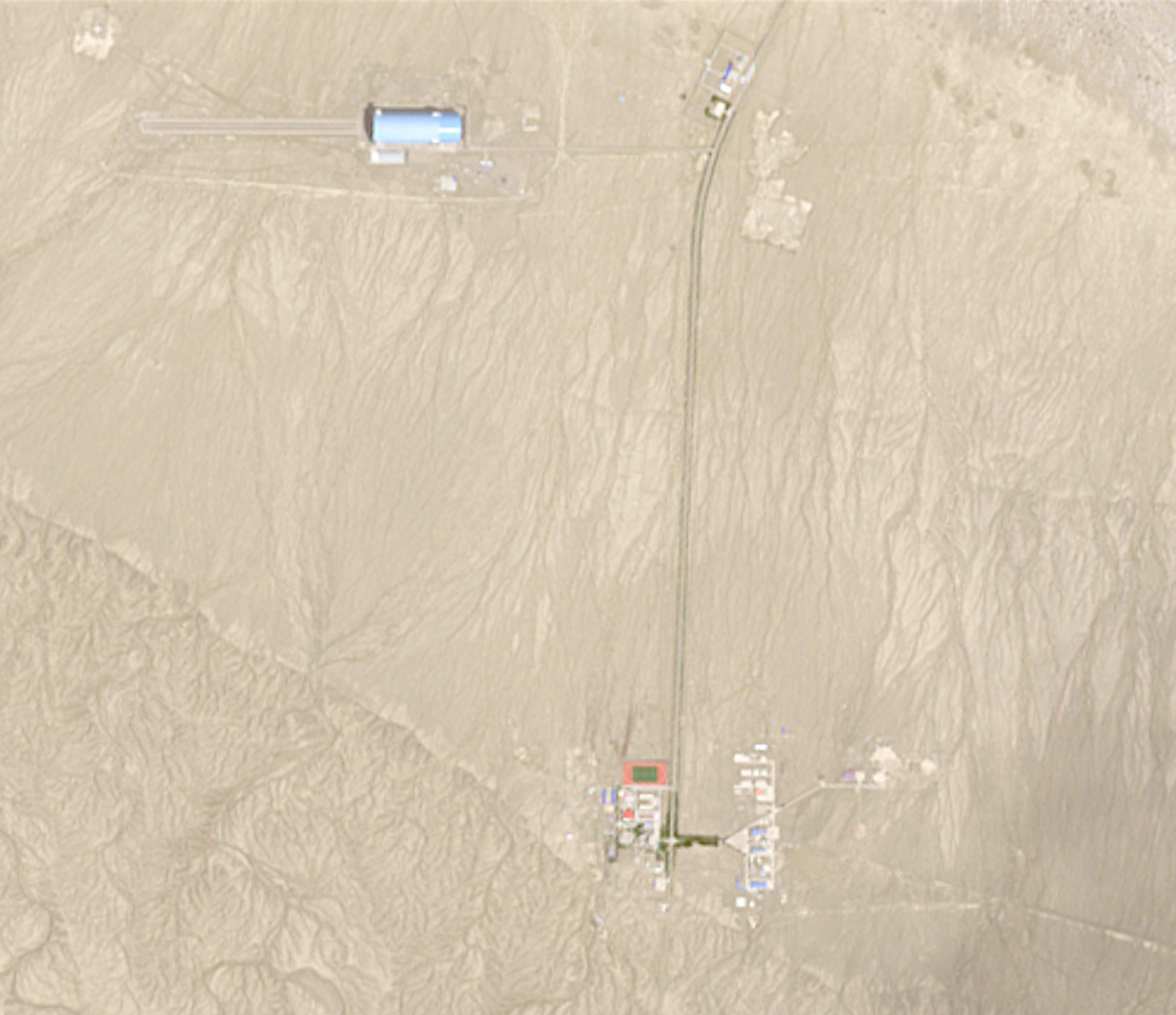
- The Bohu laser facility (bottom) in 2025, located south of a 350 m (1,150 ft) stratospheric airship hangar (top).

Site information
- Type: Military base
- Owner: China
- Operator: People's Liberation Army
- Open to the public: no
- Condition: Active

Location
- Location of the Bohu laser facility
- Coordinates: 41°45′48″N 87°25′06″E

Site history
- Built: 2003
- In use: 2004–present

Garrison information
- Occupants: Unit 63655 (MUCD)

The Bohu laser facility is a laser anti-satellite weapon (ASAT) station in Xinjiang, China, operated by the People's Liberation Army as part of China's national ASAT program. The facility operates ground-based soft-kill counterspace systems for the laser ranging, dazzling, and blinding of satellites. The facility is believed to be one of China's main research and development centers for directed-energy weapons. It consists of multiple buildings with retractable roofs for laser operations, and is believed also to house mobile, vehicle-based laser systems. The facility's chemical laser arrays are suspected to have at least limited destructive ASAT capabilities.

The facility's true name is not known. The most commonly used name for the facility, "Bohu", is merely a Chinese slang abbreviation for the name of the adjacent Bosten Lake (博斯腾湖; Bósīténg Hú). Western observers sometimes refer to the facility as the Bosten Lake facility or the Korla East Test Site for the nearby city situated to the west.

The facility is believed to be managed by PLA Unit 63655, a detachment of Unit 63650, the secretive test and evaluation command which controls Malan Nuclear Test Base located on the opposite side of the lake. Malan is responsible for the ranges at nearby Lop Nur used for China's nuclear and biological weapons testing.

Command and control for Bohu's reversible non-destructive dazzling operations is believed to be held at the theater command level for targets in the Western Theater Command; destructive ASAT operations which could be viewed as an act of war are believed to be coordinated through the Central Military Commission in Beijing.

== History ==
China has had an anti-satellite weapon (ASAT) program since 1964, created in the wake of Chairman Mao Zedong's 16 December 1963 instruction to Nie Rongzhen to "organize a group of people to specifically study [the death ray]." (死光，要组织一批人专门去研究它).

The Bohu laser facility was built in 2003 to advance the country's capabilities in offensive soft-kill ASAT systems. Operations at the site commenced in 2004.

The facility was originally subordinate to Unit 63650 of the PLA General Armaments Department, the unit responsible for Chinese nuclear testing, located on the opposite side of Bosten Lake. Since the 2015 PLA reforms that abolished the General Armament Department, responsibility for the Bohu facility shifted to Unit 63655, a subordinate unit under Unit 63650 which holds patents in such diverse research areas as lasers and optics, very large stratospheric airships, and high-powered microwaves. The Bohu facility sits just south of one of the world's largest hangars, used to build and store such airships.

Some believe Units 63650 and 63655 were absorbed by the now-defunct PLA Strategic Support Force (PLASSF) Unit 32026 when the General Armaments Division was abolished in 2015. Between 2015 and 2023, Unit 32026, likely the unit number for Base 36, was headquartered in Kaifeng, Henan and had subordinate units located at least in Ürümqi, Xi'an, and in Beijing and Tianjin Municipalities.

Since the 2023 disestablishment of the PLASSF in favor of diffusing responsibilities to three new military branches, including a new independent space force, the PLA Aerospace Force (PLAASF), the organizational hierarchy of the command structure above the numbered units themselves is unclear.

== Command and control ==
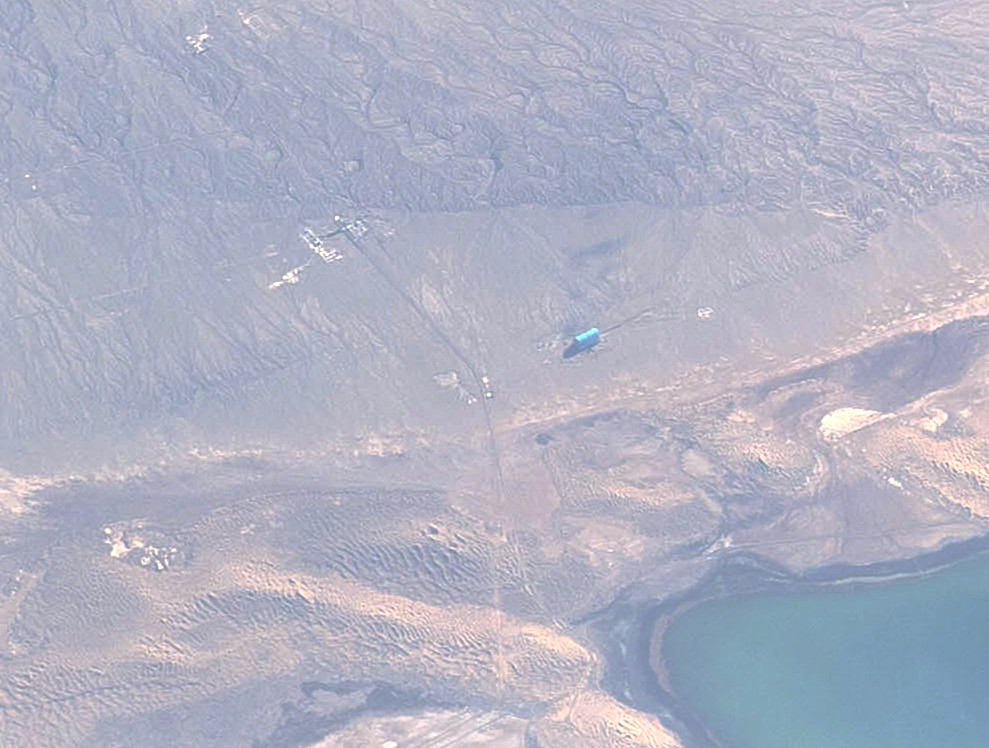
Bohu laser facility as seen from the International Space Station in 2016.

Authorization for the use of the various capabilities at Bohu is likely to be mixed, and dependent on the capability and target. According to the U.S. Air Force's China Aerospace Studies Institute (CASI), the PLA Central Military Commission (CMC) is believed to categorize destructive, non-reversible attacks with directed energy weapons as "strategic", necessitating approval from national leadership, whereas low-powered, reversible attacks are viewed as "campaign", and "tactical" matters, suggesting that theater commands can probably leverage the low-powered, reversible weapons without repetitive higher approval. The U.S. assesses that when limited to in-theater targets, reversible satellite laser dazzling and weapons to disable systems using space information, such as microwave weapons and network-electromagnetic spectrum weapons, can probably be readily tasked at the theater command level.

Authorization for dazzling is likely given more freely and at lower levels of command in order to mitigate reliance on alternative technologies like satellite electronic jamming, which can potentially cause electromagnetic spectrum interference for the PLA, and for Chinese and neighboring countries' civilian infrastructure.

== Capabilities ==
Since 2022, the U.S. Department of Defense's China Military Power Report has stated:

"The PRC has multiple ground-based laser weapons of varying power levels to disrupt, degrade, or damage satellites that include a current limited capability to employ laser systems against satellite sensors. By the mid- to late-2020s, the PRC may field higher power systems to extend the threat to the structures of non-optical satellites."

This reporting is believed to be a reference to Bohu's facilities. A 2022 report from the U.S. Defense Intelligence Agency (DIA) assesses that China has achieved a "limited capability" in anti-satellite directed-energy technology. The effectiveness of the ASAT technology at Bohu remains publicly unknown; the DIA report suggests that it has a destructive capability but has not demonstrated it yet. According to a report from CASI, China has other laser facilities which are less scrutinized by researchers than Bohu because "Bohu is one of the known facilities that clearly houses probably enough fuel for a high-power chemical laser" which could be used for destructive effects.

An assessment from the Secure World Foundation concludes that the Bohu facility is likely the "main site" for China's directed-energy weapon research and development, and that the facility's work "may be aimed at developing vehicle-mounted dazzling or destructive lasers." Other reports suggest China is extensively fielding mobile dazzling capabilities.

== Facilities ==
The Bohu facility has grown over time. The first construction at the site began in January or February 2002 with the latitudinal road which runs through the facility. By mid-October construction had begun on the first buildings at what would become the administrative headquarters, as well as the first administrative building for the laser facility. Construction of facilities to house lasers began in 2003 and was finished by 2004. There was an expansion in 2009 with a number of new buildings added. Since then, periodic additions have been identified, and it appears that construction now occurs on an as-needed basis:

Building	Construction period	Features
A	May – October 2009	Optical equipment (Retracting Roof)
B	August 2003	Optical equipment (Retracting Roof + Annex)
C	February 2004	Optical equipment (Retracting Roof)
D	June 2004	Optical equipment (Roof on wheels)
E	April – October 2004	Office
F	August 2010	Office
G	April – October 2004	Office
H	April – October 2004	Office
I	April – October 2004	Office
J	August – October 2009	Office
K	August – October 2009	Office
L	April – October 2004	Office
M	April – October 2004	Office
N	After 2017	Optical equipment (Believed to be static)
O	April 2021	Unknown
