= Lam Tian Xing =

Lam Tian Xing (formerly known as Lam Sin), also known as “Master of the Hall of Boundlessness”, is a color ink painter. He has been studying and practicing Chinese painting, Western painting and Chinese calligraphy since age fourteen.

During 30 years of artistic exploration, his style blended the traditional framework of Chinese ink color painting with western techniques. He applies rich, vibrant colors to form layered images that are both abstract and concrete.

Lam was twice invited by the Chinese Ministry of Culture to paint on the theme of Hong Kong views. The paintings, ”Morning Songs” and “Sideview in Victoria Harbour”, accompanied the space journeys of Shenzhou VI and Shenzhou VII in 2005 and 2008 respectively.

Since the late 1990s Lam has created a series of works on the theme of Hong Kong scenery and landscapes. He travelled to Tibet three times, risking his life, and created his “Tibet in Tian Xing” series.

His series “Lotus in Tian Xing” uniquely marked his personal artistic development. His paintings are well received by public and private collectors alike, both local and overseas.

== Early life ==
Lam was born in October 1963 in Fujian Province, China. He began studying Western and Chinese paintings in 1978 under the guidance of masters such as Wu Gouguang, Lin Guang, Chen Ting and Liu Mu.

He immigrated to Hong Kong in 1984. He returned to China to continue his studies and graduated from the Chinese Painting Department of Beijing Central Academy of Fine Arts in 1990.

Lam took a teaching post at the Hong Kong First Institute of Art and Design upon his graduation, and taught there until 1998.

== Career ==
Lam has held more than 50 solo exhibitions in Beijing, Hong Kong, New York, Berlin, Milan, Singapore, Taipei and Seoul. Solo exhibitions:

- Centennial Exhibition of Chinese Paintings in Beijing
- China National Art Exhibition, the Art Exhibition commemorating the 30th Anniversary of Reform and Opening
- International Ink Painting Biennial Exhibition of Shenzhen
- Contemporary Hong Kong Art Biennial Exhibition

He participated in more than one hundred joint exhibitions around the globe.

Lam's works have been collected by private and corporate organizations, both locally and overseas.

Museum collections:

- National Art Museum of China
- Research Institute of Chinese Painting in Beijing\
- Guangzhou Museum of Art
- Shenzhen Museum of Art
- Hong Kong Museum of Art
- Heritage Museum of Hong Kong
- Hong Kong Government House
- Hong Kong Trade Development Council of Washington

Other collections:

- Cathay Pacific
- Hong Kong Four Seasons Hotel
- Macau Four Seasons Hotel
- Hong Kong Mandarin Oriental Hotel
- Beijing Shangri-La Hotel
- United Airlines
- Credit Suisse HK Representative Offices

He published more than twenty albums of his work.

He served as chairman of the Hong Kong International Art Association. He works as a professional painter. He is a member of the China Artists Association, a member of the Founding Committee of the Chinese Painting Institute, a specialist of the Li Keran Academy of Painting, visiting painter of the Shenzhen Art Gallery and consultant of the 4-D Art Club.
