= Shenzhou 7 =

2008 Chinese crewed spaceflight

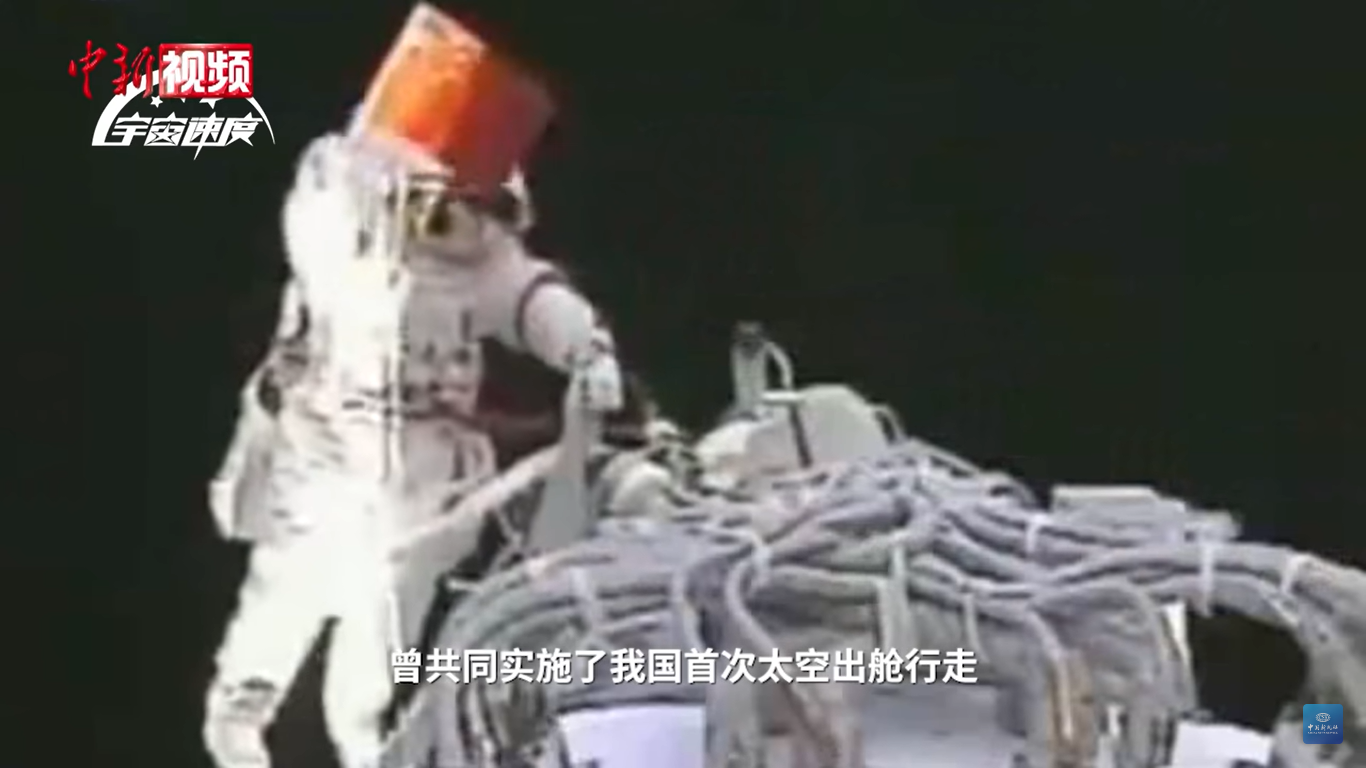
- Zhai Zhigang spacewalking during the Shenzhou 7 mission
- Mission type: Crewed test flight
- Operator: China Manned Space Agency
- COSPAR ID: 2008-047A
- SATCAT no.: 33386
- Mission duration: 2 days, 20 hours, 27 minutes

Spacecraft properties
- Spacecraft type: Shenzhou
- Manufacturer: China Aerospace Science and Technology Corporation

Crew
- Crew size: 3
- Members: Zhai Zhigang; Liu Boming; Jing Haipeng
- EVAs: 1
- EVA duration: 22 minutes

Start of mission
- Launch date: 25 September 2008, 13:10:04 UTC
- Rocket: Long March 2F
- Launch site: Jiuquan, LA-4/SLS-1
- Contractor: China Academy of Launch Vehicle Technology

End of mission
- Landing date: 28 September 2008, 09:37:40 UTC
- Landing site: Siziwang Banner, Inner Mongolia (42°16′37″N 111°21′34″E)

Orbital parameters
- Reference system: Geocentric orbit
- Regime: Low Earth orbit
- Perigee altitude: 330 km (210 mi)
- Apogee altitude: 340 km (210 mi)
- Inclination: 42.41°
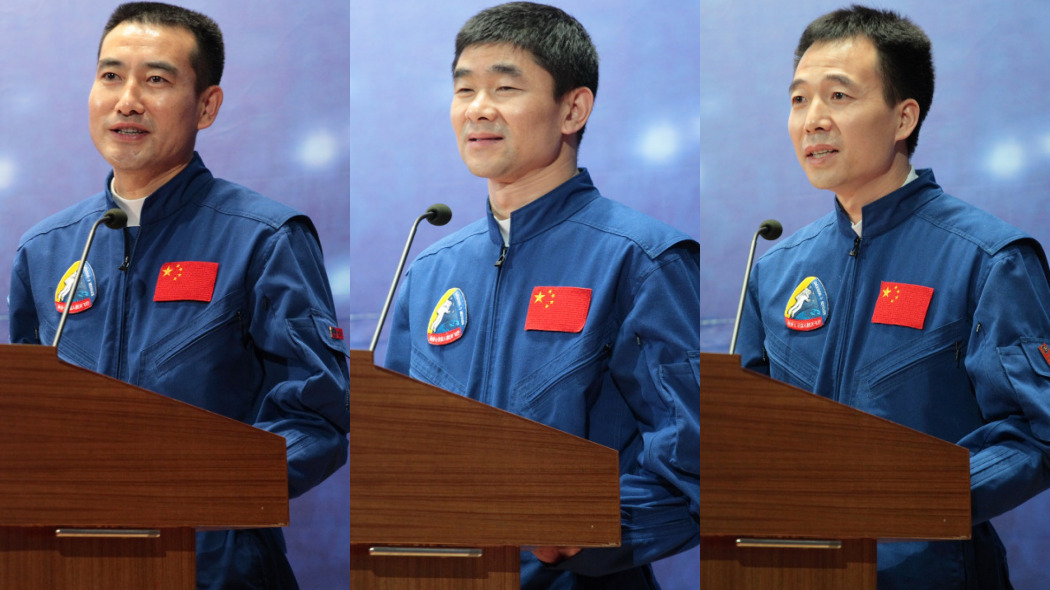
- Mission insignia Zhai, Liu and Jing Shenzhou program

Shenzhou 7 (simplified Chinese: 神舟七号; traditional Chinese: 神舟七號; pinyin: Shénzhōu qī hào) was the third human spaceflight mission of the Chinese space program. The mission, which included the first Chinese extra-vehicular activity (EVA) carried out by crew members Zhai Zhigang and Liu Boming, marked the start of the "second step" of the China Manned Space Program.

The Shenzhou spacecraft carrying the three crew members was launched 25 September 2008, by a Long March 2F rocket, making its final flight before being replaced by the 2F/G, which lifted off from the Jiuquan Satellite Launch Center at 21:10 CST. The mission lasted three days, after which the craft landed safely in Siziwang Banner in central Inner Mongolia on 28 September 2008, at 17:37 CST. The Shenzhou 7 EVA made the Chinese space program the third to have conducted an EVA. EVAs had previously been conducted by the space programs of the Soviet Union (later Russia) and the United States.

== Crew ==
The crew for Shenzhou 7 was announced on 17 September 2008.

Prime crew
Position	Crew
Commander	Zhai Zhigang; First spaceflight
Orbital module astronaut	Liu Boming; First spaceflight
Descent module monitor astronaut	Jing Haipeng; First spaceflight

Backup crew
Position	Crew
Commander	Chen Quan
Orbital module astronaut	Fei Junlong
Descent module monitor astronaut	Nie Haisheng

Of the back-up crew, only Chen Quan had not previously flown in space.

== Mission highlights ==
Shenzhou 7 was the first Chinese space mission to carry a three-person crew for several days and conduct a full operation. A total of six astronauts were trained, three to conduct the mission and three others to serve as a backup crew.

The Long March 2F rocket launched the Shenzhou 7 into an initial elliptical orbit of 200 x 330 kilometres inclined at 42.4 degrees on 25 September 2008. About seven hours later the spacecraft raised its orbit to a more circular orbit of 330 x 336 km. After three days in space, deorbit manoeuvres began on 28 September at 08:48, and the return module landed at 09:37 UTC at coordinates 42.278°N 111.355°E.

China has been congratulated by a number of foreign leaders for the successful completion of the mission, which marked a number of developments for China's space program, including several first-time achievements.

The Shenzhou 7 Mission won the 2009 Space Achievement Award from the Space Foundation.

=== Spacewalk ===
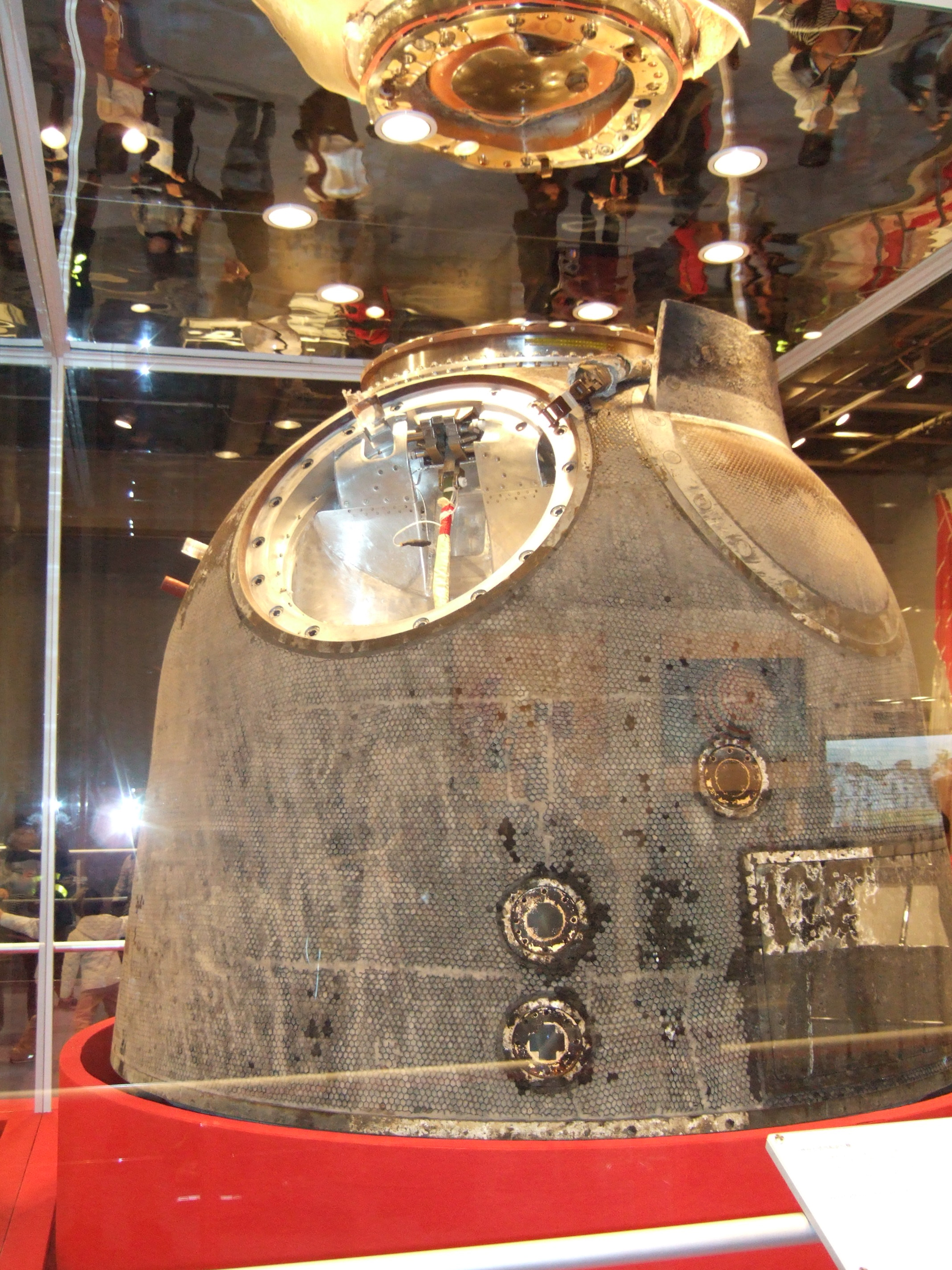
Space capsule of Shenzhou 7 at a 'homecoming' exhibition in Hong Kong

On 27 September, Zhai Zhigang, wearing a Chinese-developed Feitian space suit, conducted a 22-minute space walk, the first ever for a Chinese astronaut. Zhai slipped out of the orbital module in a head-first position at around 16:43 (0843 GMT) and wandered around the orbital module, retrieved experiment samples and waved the Chinese flag in space. The spacewalk lasted about 20 minutes, with Zhai returning to the orbital module at 17:00. The first space walk was limited in scope: cables were used to tie Zhai to the handrail outside the orbital module, and his moving route was restricted to areas near the exits. Liu Boming, wearing a Russian Orlan-M suit, stayed in the airlock in the orbital module to provide help if necessary. Liu also conducted an EVA, standing up at 08:58 UTC to hand Zhai a flag. The third astronaut, Jing Haipeng remained in the re-entry module to monitor the general situation of the spacecraft. By 09:00 UTC both astronauts were back inside and the hatch was closed. The space walk was broadcast live on Chinese media, and two cameras provided panoramic images.

The Feitian spacesuit is similar to the Orlan-M (known as Haiying, 海鹰, in Chinese) in shape and volume and are designed for spacewalks of up to seven hours, providing oxygen and allowing for the excretion of bodily waste. According to Chinese media reports, spacesuit materials with such features as fire and radiation resistance were developed by several civilian corporations and national institutes. Each suit was reported to have cost 30 million RMB (about US$4.4 million). Except for the gloves of the Feitian suit, the space suits were not brought back to Earth.

A fire alarm was reported to the control center at the beginning of the EVA, but it was confirmed to be a false alarm.

=== Solid lubricant experiment ===
Scientists conducted a solid lubricant exposure experiment during the mission. A piece of equipment the size of a book was installed on the outside wall of the orbital module, and was later retrieved during the space walk, after having been exposed in space for more than 40 hours. The experiment was aimed to study a lubricant which will be used for space-based moving components in future space facilities.

=== Release of miniaturized satellite ===
A miniaturized satellite was released during the mission on 27 September at 19:24, after Zhai returned to the spacecraft. The satellite was a cube about 40 cm (16 in) long, with a mass of 40 kilograms (88 lb); it carried boost devices and two 150-megapixel stereo cameras. The satellite's tasks included testing the mini-satellite technology, observing and monitoring the spacecraft, and testing the tracking and approaching technology used for space rendezvous and docking.

The miniaturized satellite took photos and videos near the spacecraft, then maneuvered to about 100 to 200 kilometres (62 to 124 mi) away from the spacecraft. After the return module separated from the spacecraft and re-entered the atmosphere, the satellite caught up to the orbiting spacecraft using a liquid ammonia engine, then continue to orbit around the spacecraft. The mini-satellite will work for about three months.

=== Data relay satellite ===
China launched its first data relay satellite, called Tianlian I (天链一号), from the Xichang Satellite Launch Center on a Long March-3C carrier rocket on 25 April 2008. The Tianlian I satellite will be used to speed up communication between the Shenzhou 7 spacecraft and the ground stations, and to increase the amount of data that can be transferred to the ground. The Tianlian I satellite alone can cover 50 percent of the orbit of Shenzhou 7—whereas the Yuanwang space tracking ships, along with China's ten ground observation stations, have a coverage of only 12 percent—and thus will increase the total coverage to about 62 percent of the mission.

== Mission support and preparation ==
=== Subsystems ===
The Shenzhou 7 project consists of seven subsystems, with the Chinese military responsible for launching, recovering, crew, and tracking subsystems, China Aerospace Science and Technology Corporation responsible for the carrier rocket and spacecraft itself, and the Chinese Academy of Sciences responsible for the payloads on board the spacecraft (other than the crew).

=== Water training pool ===
A columniform water training pool of 23 metres (75 ft) in diameter and 10 metres (33 ft) in depth, located in China Astronaut Training Center, simulates the weightlessness experienced in space. A model of the Shenzhou orbital module has been used in the pool to train the crew for the space walk.

=== Modifications to the CZ-2F carrier rocket ===
Special attention has been paid to solving vibration problems that were encountered 120 seconds into the Shenzhou 5 mission. These vibrations were described by Shenzhou 5 astronaut Yang Liwei as hard to endure. Corrective measures were implemented for the Shenzhou 6 mission, but since then more improvements have been added to the carrier rocket, to the pipes of the second stage, and to more than thirty other parts of the spacecraft..

=== Modifications to the spacecraft ===
The Orbital module has been modified and its solar panels removed in order to allow for the EVA experiment. For this same reason, in contrast to previous Shenzhou missions, it will not remain in space after its separation with the departing crew in the Return module. Handrails have been added to the external wall of the Orbital module to allow the space walking astronaut to reach specific experiment areas.

More cameras have been installed on this spacecraft than on the Shenzhou 6 vessel, in addition to those covering the Orbital module and the Return module.

=== New space tracking ships ===
Two new, recently commissioned Yuanwang-class tracking ships, Yuanwang-5 and Yuanwang-6, played a key role in the Shenzhou VII mission.

=== Toilets ===
Custom-made, compact, foldable toilets allow the astronaut's collected urine to be scientifically inspected.

=== Project management ===
Most of the Shenzhou 6 project management team has stayed for the Shenzhou 7 mission. Changes in personnel include:

- General Project Manager and Commander Chen Bingde has been replaced, after his promotion to the position of Chief of the General Staff, by the current Director-General of the General Armaments Department, Chang Wanquan.
- First Vice General Project Manager and Commander Lieutenant General Hu Shixiang (胡世祥) has been replaced by the current Vice Director-General of the General Armaments Department, Lieutenant General Zhang Jianqi (张建启)
- Vice General Project Manager and Commander Zhang Qingwei has been replaced after his promotion to head of the ACAC consortium, by Ma Xingrui, the head of China Aerospace Science and Technology Corporation
- Vice General Engineer of Shenzhou 6, Zhou Jianping (周建平) was promoted to General Engineer of Shenzhou 7, succeeding Wang Yongzhi.
- Director of the Jiuquan Satellite Launch Center: Major General Zhang Yulin (张育林) has been replaced, after his promotion to Chancellor of the National University of Defense Technology, by the Vice Director of Jiuquan Satellite Launch Center Major General Cui Jijun (崔吉俊)

== Controversy ==
According to the United States Strategic Command, at 15:07 Greenwich Mean Time on 27 September 2008, the Shenzhou 7 ship passed within 45 kilometers of the International Space Station. There is no international laws defining distance of passage of outer space objects. China did not respond to queries about why it allowed its ship to pass so close to the space station. Richard Fisher, a senior fellow at the International Assessment and Strategy Center, in an opinion piece in the Wall Street Journal noted that the Shenzhou 7 had launched its companion satellite BX-1 four hours earlier. The IASC is a "think-tank" focused on medium and long-term security issues and their impact on the security of the United States and her key allies. He noted "China's track record of using all of its Shenzhou missions since 1999 for dual military-civil missions," and speculated that China may have used the opportunity to pass near the space station to test "co-orbital" antisatellite interception technology.

== See also ==
- Chinese space program
- Tiangong program
- Jiuquan Satellite Launch Center
- Long March 2F Rocket
- Voskhod 2, first spacewalk mission, first Soviet spacewalk, first spacewalk from a 2-man crew mission
- Gemini 4, first US spacewalk mission, second spacewalk mission, second spacewalk from a 2-man crew mission
- Voskhod 1, first 3-man crew mission
- Soyuz 5, first 3-man crew mission with EVA
