= ASAT program of China =

Chinese military initiative

China's anti-satellite (ASAT) program has been under development since 1964. The ASAT program has since been moved from Program 640 to Program 863, the General Armaments Department and the State Administration for Science, Technology and Industry for National Defense (SASTIND, formerly known as Commission for Science, Technology and Industry for National Defense). Since its inception, the ASAT program has made progress on the development of three ASAT capable Systems: direct fire, directed-energy weapon, and microsatellites. Tests of these systems have either been directly acknowledged by the PRC, or reported on as ASAT capable. China is pursuing a broad and robust array of counterspace capabilities, which includes direct-ascent antisatellite missiles, co-orbital antisatellite systems, computer network operations, groundbased satellite jammers, and directed energy weapons.

People's Liberation Army (PLA) has formed military units and begun initial operational training with counterspace capabilities that it has been developing, such as ground-launched ASAT missiles.

== History ==
China has worked on technologies applicable to Anti-Satellite (ASAT) weaponry since 1964. According to Qian Xuesen, at a meeting in 1964, "suddenly Chairman Mao asked me if it was possible to shoot down a missile, I replied that it should be possible." In 1966, China formally began to develop a missile interceptor system, Program 640. This program was centered at a research base in Yunnan and the PLA Air Force oversaw it.

For much of the 1960s and 1970s the majority of funding and development of ASAT capabilities were run through Program 640. The program's progress was hampered by the effects of the Cultural Revolution, because many of the prominent scientists associated with the program were among those purged by the younger generation.

In 1978, Deng Xiaoping directed that resources be concentrated on ICBMs, submarine-launched ballistics missiles, and communications satellites. Program 640 wound down.

In 1986, established its National High-Technology Research and Development Plan, Program 863. Program 863 has since been closely tied to the operations of the General Armaments Department's Project 921 and COSTIND (now known as SASTIND) of the PLA. Program 863 included efforts to respond to the US' Strategic Defense Initiative (SDI) through the development of counterspace weapons. Zhu Guangya, who was the director of COSTIND, led the efforts to study SDI and respond to it.

During the 1999 NATO bombing of Yugoslavia, the United States bombed the Chinese embassy in Belgrade. The US stated that the bombing was accidental. Chinese leadership believed that the US had intentionally bombed the embassy and viewed China has significantly lacking in leverage with the United States. Among other efforts to reduce its gap in leverage, China sought to develop its counterspace abilities. Chinese planners viewed counterspace weapons as useful for deterring attacks on China's own space capabilities, protecting its nuclear assets, and enhancing its conventional military operations.

In December 2002, Jiang Zemin stated at a Central Military Commission (CMC) meeting that the PLA would pursue counterspace weapons. Jiang stated that the United States and Russia were developing counterspace weapons and that "the military competition unfolding around space among the major world powers may potentially change the landscape of international military conflict."

China began testing counterspace weapons in 2006.

In 2008, during the development of the JL-2 submarine-launched ballistic missile, it was reported that China was considering modifying the missile to accommodate an anti-satellite warhead to give it a sea-based anti-satellite capability.

Hu Jintao's work report to the 18th Party Congress instructed the PLA to update its space strategy.

By 2013, the PLA had the capacity to launch satellites from road-mobile launchers, therefore providing it with the flexibility to do so even if its fixed launched facilities were damaged.

The PLA's General Armaments Department focused on the development of counterspace weapons until the CMC Equipment Development Department replaced it in 2015.

According to the United States, by 2023 China had "a robust network of space surveillance sensors capable of searching, tracking, and characterizing satellites in all Earth orbits."

== Systems ==
Three kinds of ASAT systems have been under development and/or active tests by the PRC. The systems are not acknowledged by the PRC as being strictly ASAT, but they are capable of destroying or disabling a satellite.

=== Direct fire systems ===
A Direct Fire System refers to the instrumentalities required for a land or vehicle based missile to strike a satellite. A Direct Fire System is a kinetic kill system designed to physically destroy or damage a satellite, instead of electronically disrupting its orbit or mission. The PRC demonstrated its ability to launch a land-based kinetic kill vehicle into a satellite when it fired a SC-19 missile into an aging Fengyun series satellite and destroyed it on January 11, 2007. No known tests of a vehicle-based Direct Fire System have occurred, but it has been reported that the new Jin-class submarine will have the ability to launch the SC-19 or a similar type of missile.

=== Directed-energy weapons ===
A directed-energy weapon (DEW) is a high powered laser or microwave weapon designed to either disrupt or damage a satellite. These weapons are part of the PRC's New Concept Weapons program. One directed-energy weapon, a high powered laser, has been under development since 1995 and was tested on orbiting US satellites in 2006. According to the United States Department of Defense, the "PRC defense research has proposed the development of several reversible and nonreversible counterspace DEWs for reversible dazzling of electro-optical sensors and even potentially destroying satellite components." The same report predicts that, by mid- to late-2020s, the PRC will be capable of fielding higher power DEW systems to threaten non-optical satellites.

=== Microsatellites ===
A microsatellite is defined as any object orbiting the Earth that has a mass greater than 10 kg and less than 500 kg. This includes man made satellites and natural satellites, like debris. While man made micro-satellites are primarily peaceful, they are easily weaponized. Because of a satellite's high relative velocity to another satellite, any collision would destroy both satellites, and micro-satellites have the advantage of being cheaper, more maneuverable and harder to track. In 2001, a Chinese newspaper stated that the PRC was testing a parasitic micro-satellite that could latch onto another satellite and destroy it on command. While no evidence has been found to demonstrate the development of such a parasite system, in 2008 the BX-1 micro-satellite released by the PRC passed dangerously close to the International Space Station at a relative speed which would have destroyed both objects had they collided. This close call raised awareness of the PRC's ability to use micro-satellites as a kinetic kill ASAT system.

== Associated government organizations and personnel ==
=== People's Liberation Army Strategic Support Force ===
In 2015, China established the People's Liberation Army Strategic Support Force to operate its space capabilities (as well as its cyber capabilities).

=== General Armaments Department ===
The General Armaments Department (GAD) of the PRC, established in 1998, has three major responsibilities. The first is to develop, maintain, and distribute all weapon systems in the PLA. The second is to manage the nation's nuclear program. The third is to oversee all space programs. The GAD has authority over all weapons development programs, including ASAT weapons. It also is responsible for space related activities, such as Project 921 (the crewed spaceflight program) and the Jiuquan Satellite Launch Centre. Every ASAT program developed by the PRC must be developed and tested by the GAD. The GAD also includes the development branch of SASTIND, and oversees the operations of Program 863.

==== Chen Bingde ====
General Chen Bingde was the Director of the GAD in 2007 during the first successful test of the Chinese Direct Fire ASAT System. Being the head of all of the PRC's military involvement in space, Chen would have overseen the development of the SC-19 and authorized its deployment on January 11, 2007. Shortly after the system's success, Chen was promoted to Chief of the General Staff.

==== Chang Wanquan ====
General Chang Wanquan was promoted to the position of Director of the GAD after General Chen Bingde accepted the position of Chief of the General Staff. Wanquan has been in charge of development and tests of the PRC's ASAT since mid-2007.

=== SASTIND ===
The State Administration for Science, Technology and Industry for National Defense (SASTIND, formerly known as COSTIND) is the scientific branch of the PRC's military and was absorbed into the GAD when it was formed in 1998. The institution has changed over the years, and continues to change, but there are five major responsibilities within their jurisdiction.

- To provide policy recommendations on anything regarding science, technology, and industry for national defense.
- To organize the structure of the science, technology, and industry community in regards to national defense.
- To research and develop new technologies for national defense.
- To manage the safety regulations, quality standards, technical reports, and promotion of all national defense projects in the area of science, technology, and industry.
- To deal with foreign interactions in the realms of science, technology, and industry.

Since ASAT technology is considered a tool of national defense, SASTIND is responsible for the development of ASAT programs, and all matters regarding policy recommendations, safety regulations, organization and the projects' global images.

==== Zhang Yunchuan ====
Zhang Yunchuan was director of SASTIND from 2003 to 2007. He received his degree from Harbin Military Engineering Institute, and spent most of his political career as a governor. Shortly after the successful ASAT test in 2007 he was promoted to Chairmen of the People Provisional Congress.

==== Zhang Qingwei ====
Zhang Qingwei followed Yunchuan as director of SASTIND from 2007 to 2009. He received a master's degree in Engineering and has spent most of his career working on the crewed space flight program.

==== Chen Qiufa ====
Chen Qiufa replaced Qingwei as director of SASTIND in 2009. He has served in a leadership role at SASTIND since the first Direct Fire ASAT test in 2005, and he was also promoted in 2007 after the successful SC-19 test.

== Operations ==
All operations listed here have either been acknowledged by the PRC, or reported by a foreign government.

=== 2006 – Directed Energy ===
In 2006, the US National Reconnaissance Office stated that a PLA laser illuminated one of its satellites. This was the first report that China was experimenting with non-kinetic counterspace weapons.

=== Direct Fire incidents ===
==== Failed Attempts ====
There were two failed attempts made by the PRC to use a Direct Fire ASAT weapon. The first was on July 7, 2005, and the missile did not get close to the satellite. The second was on February 6, 2006, and the missile got close enough to the satellite for observers to question whether an intentional miss was the PRC's intent.

==== 2007 – SC-19 ====
From Main Article: 2007 Chinese anti-satellite missile test

The 2007 Chinese anti-satellite missile test was conducted by China on January 11, 2007. A Chinese weather satellite—the FY-1C polar orbit satellite of the Fengyun series, at an altitude of 865 kilometres (537 mi), with a mass of 750 kg—was destroyed by a kinetic kill vehicle traveling with a speed of 8 km/s in the opposite direction (see Head-on engagement). It was launched with a multistage solid-fuel missile from Xichang Satellite Launch Center or nearby.

Aviation Week & Space Technology magazine first reported the test. The report was confirmed on January 18, 2007, by a United States National Security Council (NSC) spokesman. At first the Chinese government did not publicly confirm whether or not the test had occurred; but on January 23, 2007, the Chinese Foreign Ministry officially confirmed that a test had been conducted. China claims it formally notified the U.S., Japan and other countries about the test in advance. The Chinese claim is consistent with a sharp rise in queries from American sites concerning FY-1C on at least one space-related Web site starting about 24 hours before the actual intercept.

=== 2008 – BX-1 ===
In September 2008, the PRC sent three men into space on the Shenzhou-7. During their time in orbit the astronauts released the BX-1 micro-satellite. Within 4 hours of its release the micro-satellite flew within 27 miles of the International Space Station at a relative speed of 17,000 mph. The International Space Station will move if anything gets within 1,000 miles of its position, and the micro-satellite was well within this range and dangerously close to the Station. A collision between the BX-1 and the Station would have destroyed both objects and been fatal to the astronauts aboard the Station. The BX-1 did not strike the Station, but demonstrated China's ability to develop and deploy a micro-satellite with ASAT capabilities.

=== 2010 – SC-19 ===
On January 11, 2010, the PRC directed another SC-19 (雙城-19) missile at a moving target and destroyed it. This time the target was a CSS-X-11 medium-range ballistic missile launched from Shuangchengzi Space and Missile Center. While using the same systems as the January 11, 2007 test, it is not clear what the function of the 2010 test was. This test is considered to be a continuation of the PRC's ASAT testing because it employed the SC-19 system, but because the target was a missile and not a satellite the test may have been directed towards re-purposing the SC-19 missile as an ABM.

=== Dong Neng series ===
On 13 May 2013, the PRC conducted a test launched from Xichang Satellite Launch Center referred to as 'Kunpeng-7. The launch was subsequently identified by the US as a test for the Dong Neng/动能-2 (DN-2) ASAT interceptor.

On 23 July 2014, the PRC was reported to have conducted a successful land based missile test. However, the US said that the test was a 'non-destructive' test of an anti-satellite weapon.

== See also ==
- Anti-satellite weapon
- Kill vehicle
- Militarisation of space
- Space debris
- Space weapon
- Space warfare
- China's military expenditure
- 2007 Chinese anti-satellite missile test
- People's Liberation Army
- Dong Neng-2
