= Jing Haipeng =

Chinese taikonaut (born 1966)

- 景海鹏
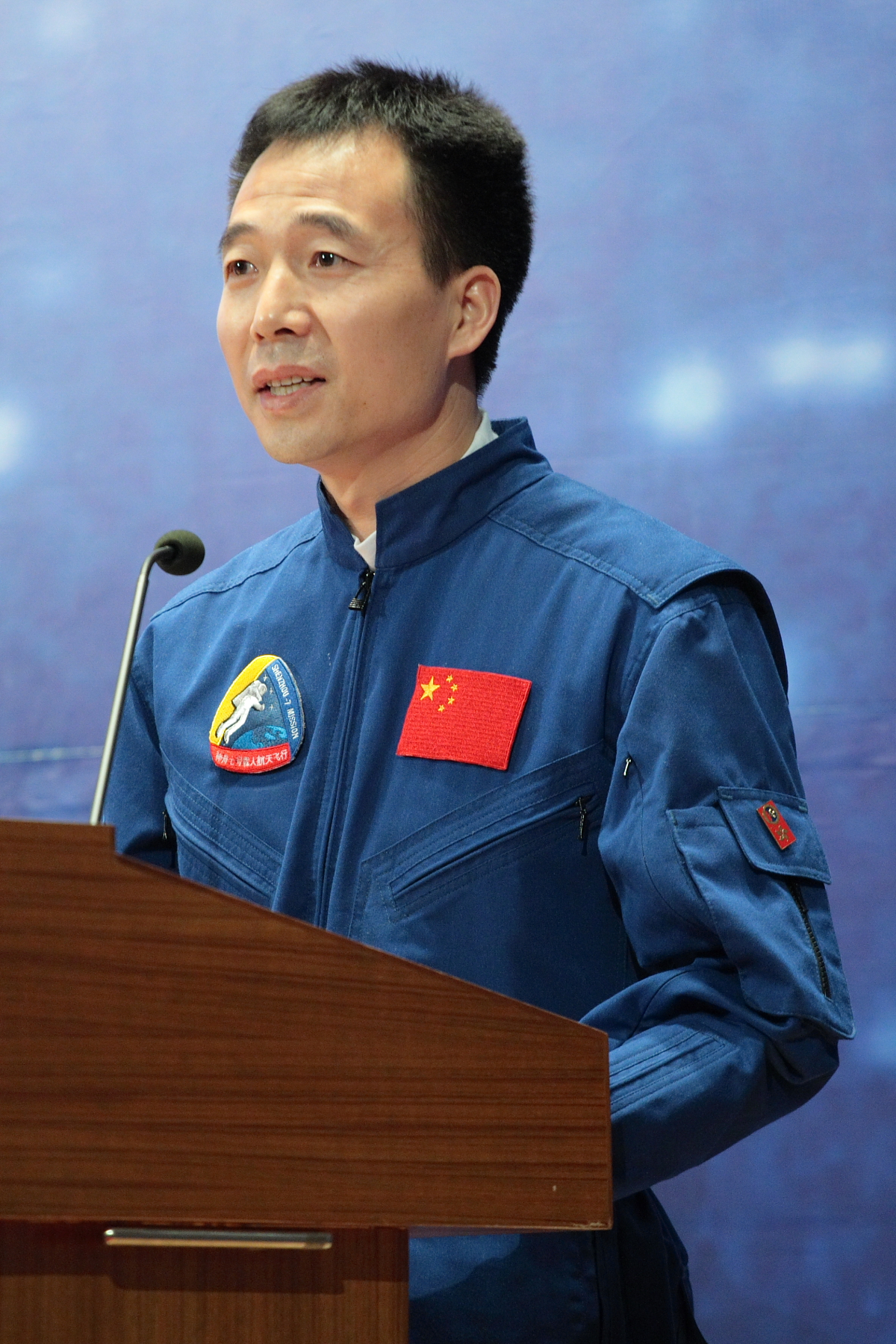
- Born: 24 October 1966 (age 60); Yuncheng, Shanxi, China
- Awards: Order of August First (2017)
- Space career

PLAAC astronaut
- Current occupation: PLA Ground Force 82nd Group Army vice-commander
- Previous occupation: PLA Air Force fighter pilot
- Status: Active
- Rank: Major General
- Time in space: 201 days, 17 hours and 2 minutes
- Selection: Chinese Group 1 (1998)
- Missions: Shenzhou 7; Shenzhou 9; Shenzhou 11; Shenzhou 16

Jing Haipeng (simplified Chinese: 景海鹏; traditional Chinese: 景海鵬; pinyin: Jǐng Hǎipéng; born 24 October 1966) is a major general of the People's Liberation Army Ground Force (PLAGF) in active service as a vice-commander of the 82nd Group Army. A fighter pilot in the PLA Air Force (PLAAF), he was selected to be a PLA Astronaut Corps (PLAAC) astronaut in 1998. He was the first Chinese astronaut to have flown on more than one mission and remains the only one to have flown on four (Shenzhou 7, Shenzhou 9, Shenzhou 11, Shenzhou 16). He also held the Chinese record for longest time spent in space from 2016 to 2021 (47 days) and again from 2023 (201 days), until his record was overtaken by Tang Hongbo in February 2024.

== Career ==
Jing was one of the six trainees for the Shenzhou 6 mission.

=== Shenzhou 7 ===
Jing, along with Liu Boming and Zhai Zhigang were selected for the prime crew on Shenzhou 7 on 17 September 2008. On 25 September 2008, at 21:10 CST, they launched into space as the first three-man crew for China aboard China's third human spaceflight mission.

=== Shenzhou 9 ===
Jing was selected as commander of Shenzhou 9, becoming the first repeat traveller of the Chinese program. He commanded the first crewed mission to dock with the first Chinese space station, Tiangong 1, with the first female astronaut, Liu Yang. The third member of his crew was Liu Wang. The mission was launched on 16 June 2012, returning to Earth on 29 June 2012.

=== Shenzhou 11 ===
On 15 October 2016, a press release indicated Jing Haipeng would be the commander of the Shenzhou 11 mission, that was slated for departure only two days later. The Shenzhou 11 launched at 07:30 on 17 October 2016 local time (23:30 UTC on 16 October 2016) from the Jiuquan Satellite Launch Center using a Long March 2F launch vehicle. The crew landed successfully after the 33 day mission on 18 November 2016.The reentry module of the Shenzhou-11 spacecraft landed in Inner Mongolia around 2.15 p.m (China time) after detaching from the space lab on 17 November 2016. After landing, Jing Haipeng held the record for the most cumulative time in space by a Chinese citizen with 47 days until 2021 when Nie Haisheng accumulated 111 days after the Shenzhou 12 mission.

In July 2017, Chairman Xi Jinping awarded Jing the Order of August First, the highest military award of People's Republic of China.

=== Shenzhou 16 ===
On 30 May 2023, Jing returned to space for the fourth time as the commander of Shenzhou 16. Shenzhou 16 successfully returned to Earth on 31 October 2023 after over 153 days in space, bringing Jing's cumulative time in space to over 201 days and allowing him to reclaim the Chinese record.

== See also ==
- List of Chinese astronauts
- Chinese space programme
