= Feitian space suit =

Chinese space suit

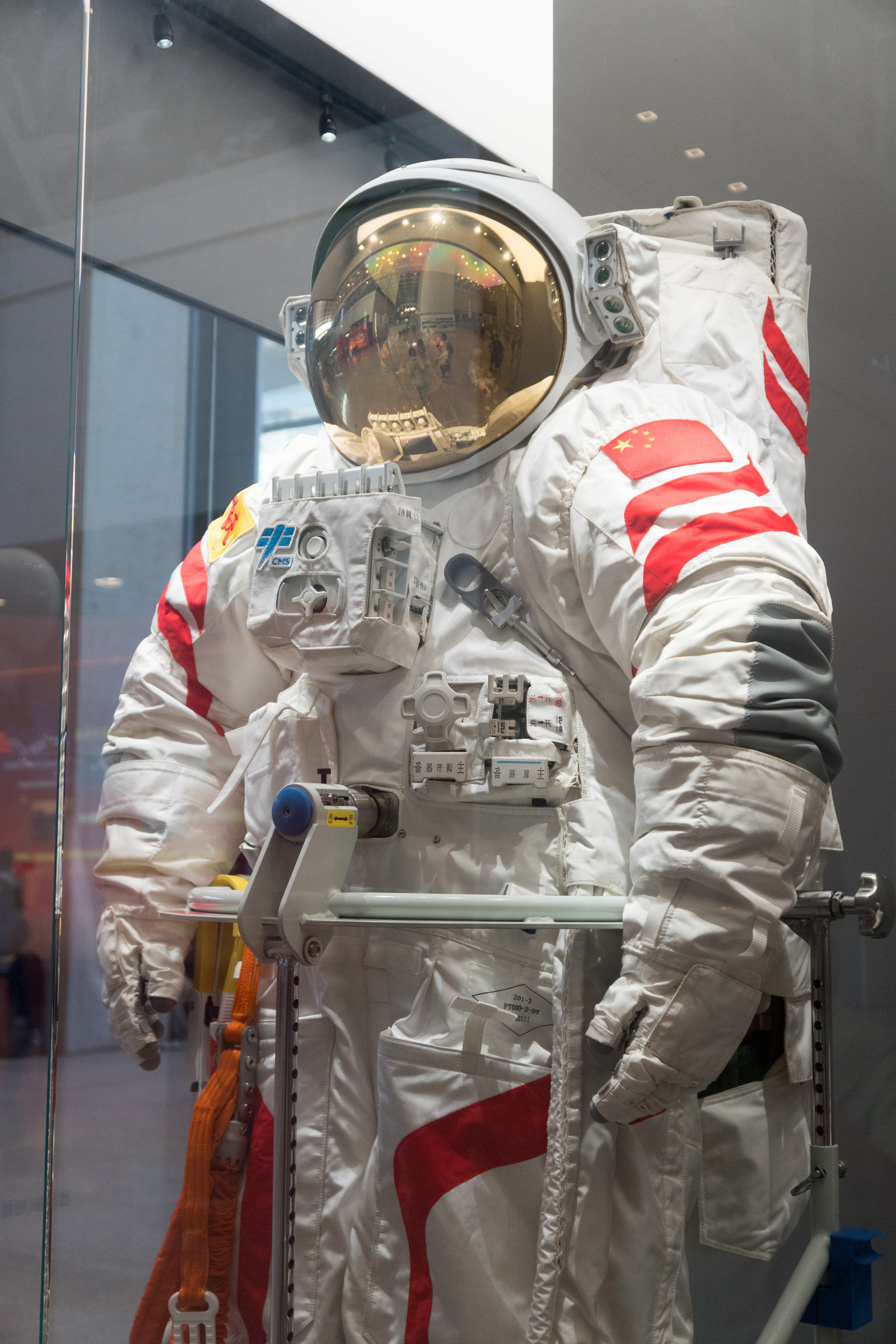
Second generation Feitian space suit

The Feitian space suit (Chinese: 飞天航天服; pinyin: Fēitiān Hángtiān Fù) is an extravehicular space suit design developed and used by the China Manned Space Program. It provides life support, environmental protection, and communications for taikonauts during extravehicular activity (EVA).

The earliest Feitian space suit was used on Shenzhou 7, worn by taikonaut Zhai Zhigang during China's first-ever spacewalk on 27 September 2008. An improved version of the Feitian space suit is used aboard the Tiangong space station, with the first EVA using the updated version being on Shenzhou 12's first EVA, on 4 July 2021.

As of December 2025, at least 21 Chinese taikonauts have completed more than 20 EVAs wearing Feitian space suits.

== Name ==
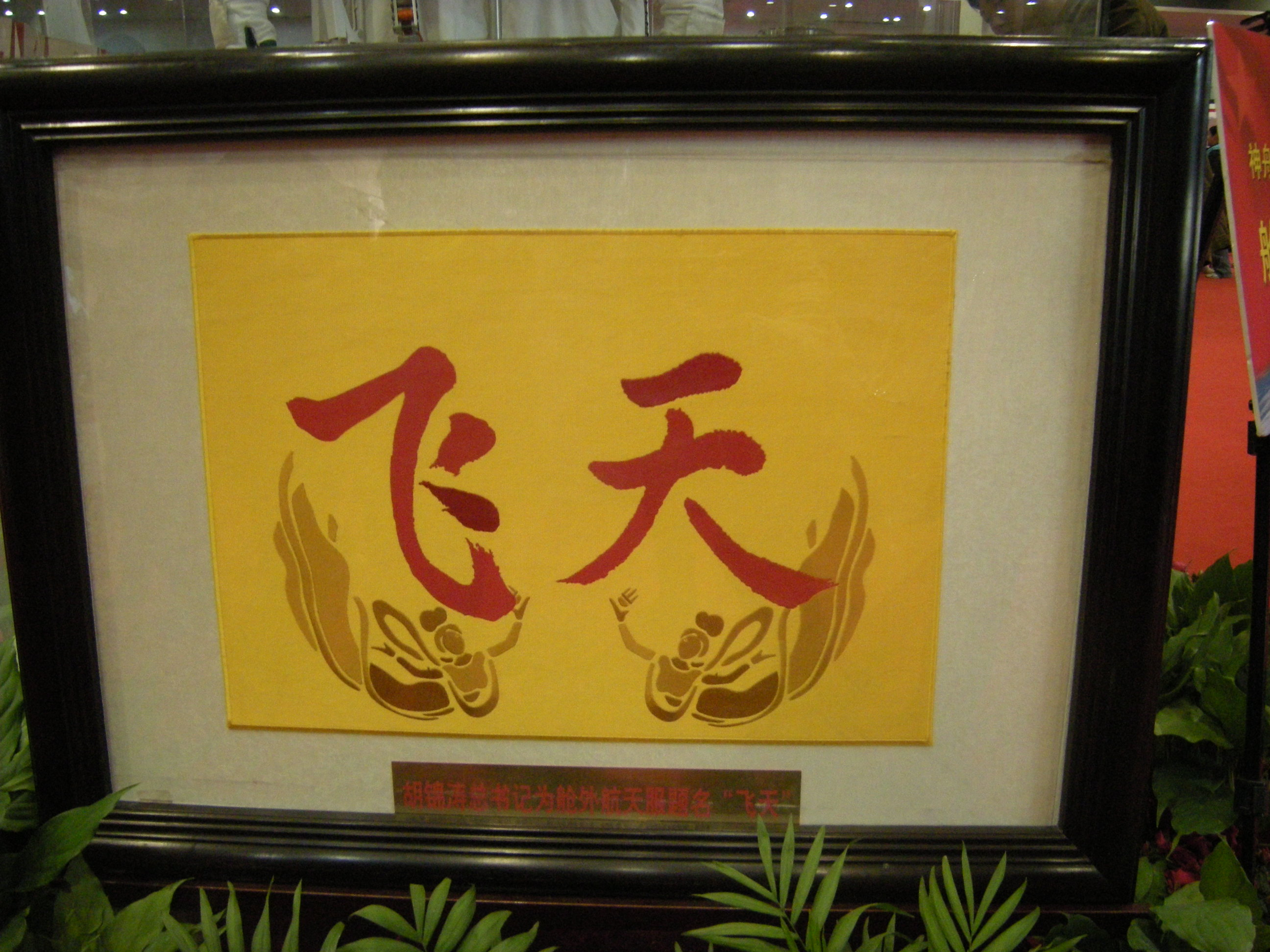
The "Fei Tian" text and goddess image on the arm badge of the Feitian space suit

The name fēi tiān literally and separately means "flying" and "sky" in Mandarin. It is a reference to the flying gods and goddesses feitian, sometimes translated as flying apsara, in Chinese, and most famously depicted in Chinese art in the grottoes of Dunhuang.

Images of the feitian from Dunhuang appear on the arm badge of the space suit.

== History ==
When the China Manned Space Program was approved in 1992, one of its "second phase" goals was to develop extravehicular activity capability. To achieve this goal, in the early 2000s, China signed an agreement with Russia to allow import of the Orlan-M space suit to China.

Also in the early 2000s, the Chinese space program began development of its own domestic EVA suit design. The first such suit was assembled in June 2006, and certified in two years later in June 2008.

On 24 September 2008, the China Manned Space Agency announced that China's first extravehicular activity would be conducted by two taikonauts, wearing the Chinese-made Feitian space suit and the Russian-made Orlan-M space suit respectively.

On 27 September 2008, Shenzhou 7 Commander Zhai Zhigang completed China's first extravehicular activity, wearing a first-generation Feitian space suit. The EVA lasted for about 20 minutes. During the EVA, taikonaut Liu Boming remained inside the spacecraft's orbital module, wearing an imported Russian Orlan-M space suit.

Nearly thirteen years after Shenzhou 7, on 4 July 2021, taikonauts Liu Boming and Tang Hongbo of Shenzhou 12 conducted China's second EVA from the newly-launched Tianhe core module of the Tiangong space station, wearing an updated second-generation version of the Feitian space suit. The updated suit design includes two variants, one with red stripes and one with blue stripes, used to distinguish between taikonauts on EVA.

A new EVA spacesuit designed for the lunar environment has been unveiled by China on 28 September 2024; it will carry a new spacesuit design called Wangyu.

== Specifications ==
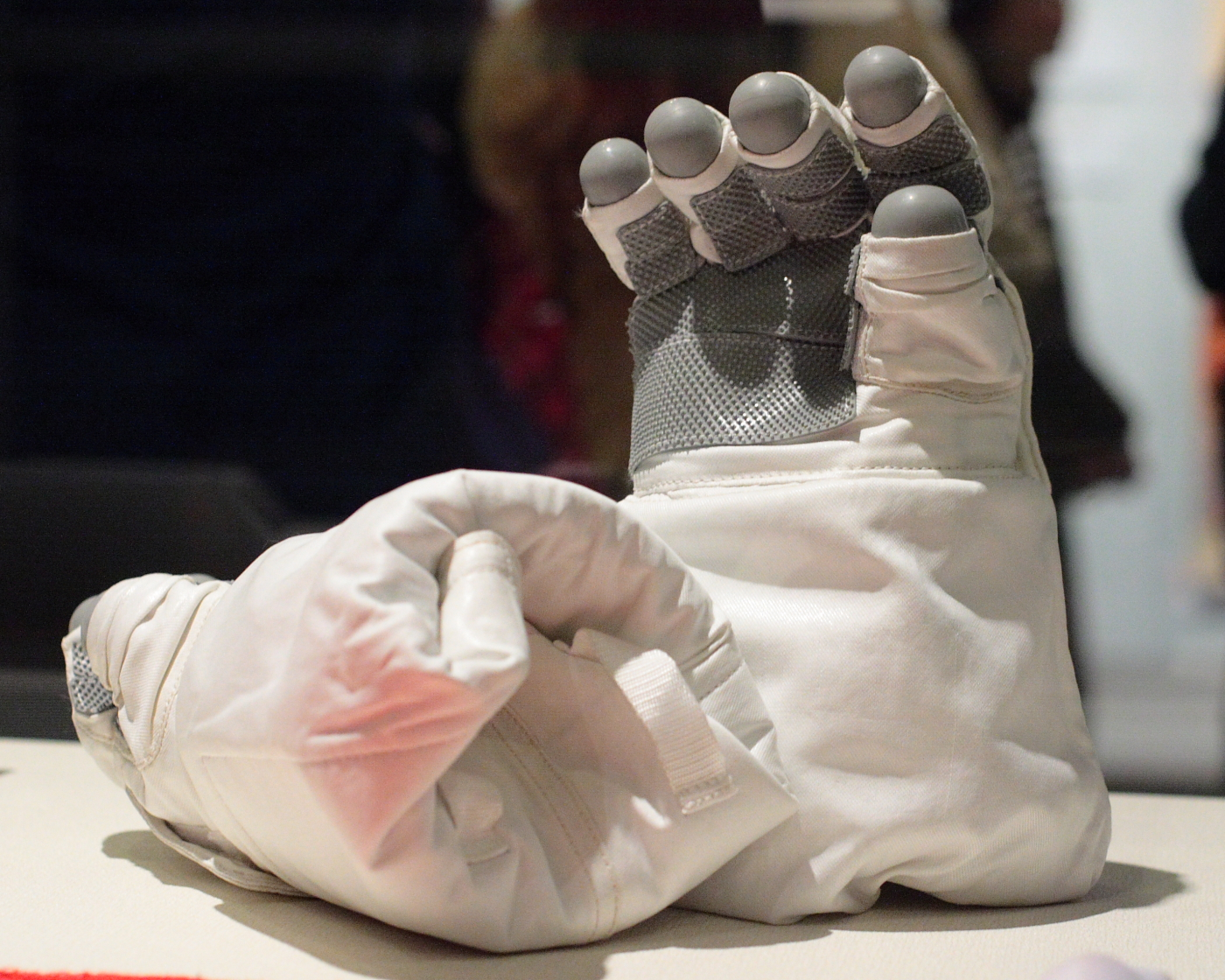
Feitian Space Gloves

=== First generation ===
- Mass: 120 kg (260 lb)
- Maximum duration in space: 4 hours
- Minimum number of usage: 5
- Cost: $4.4 million

=== Second generation ===
- Mass: 120 kg (260 lb)
- Maximum duration in space: 8 hours
- Minimum number of usage: 15

== Gallery ==
=== First generation ===
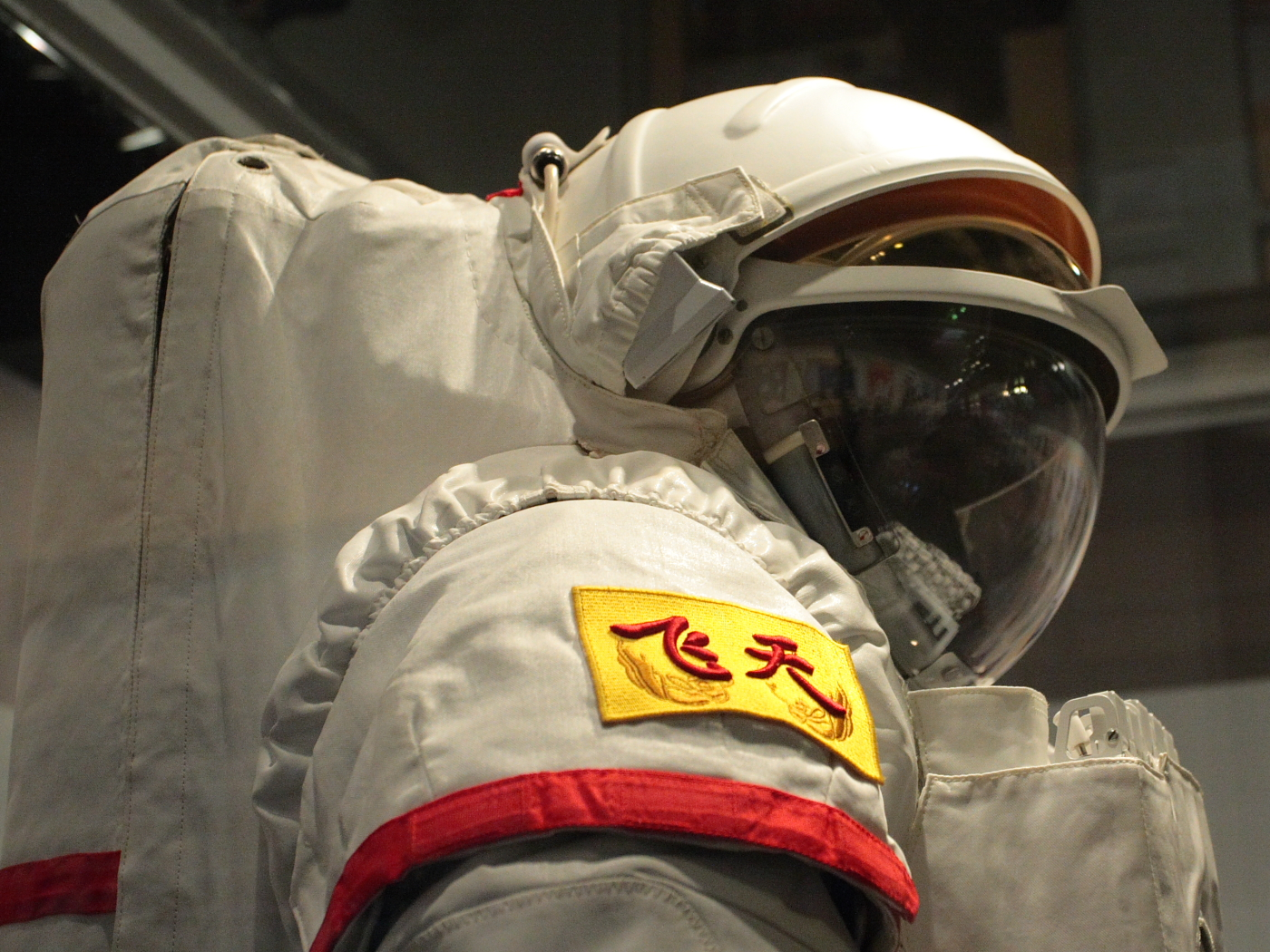

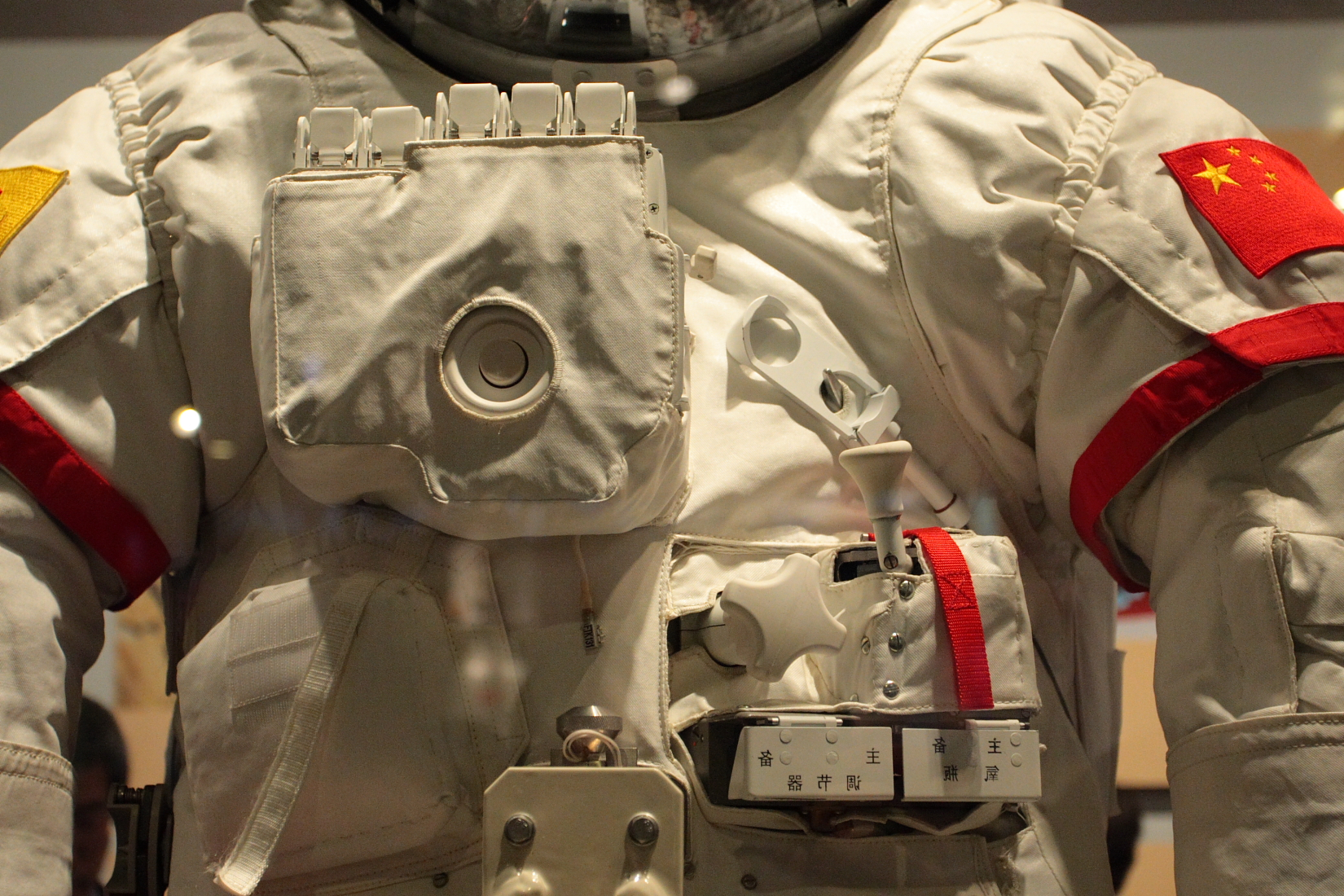

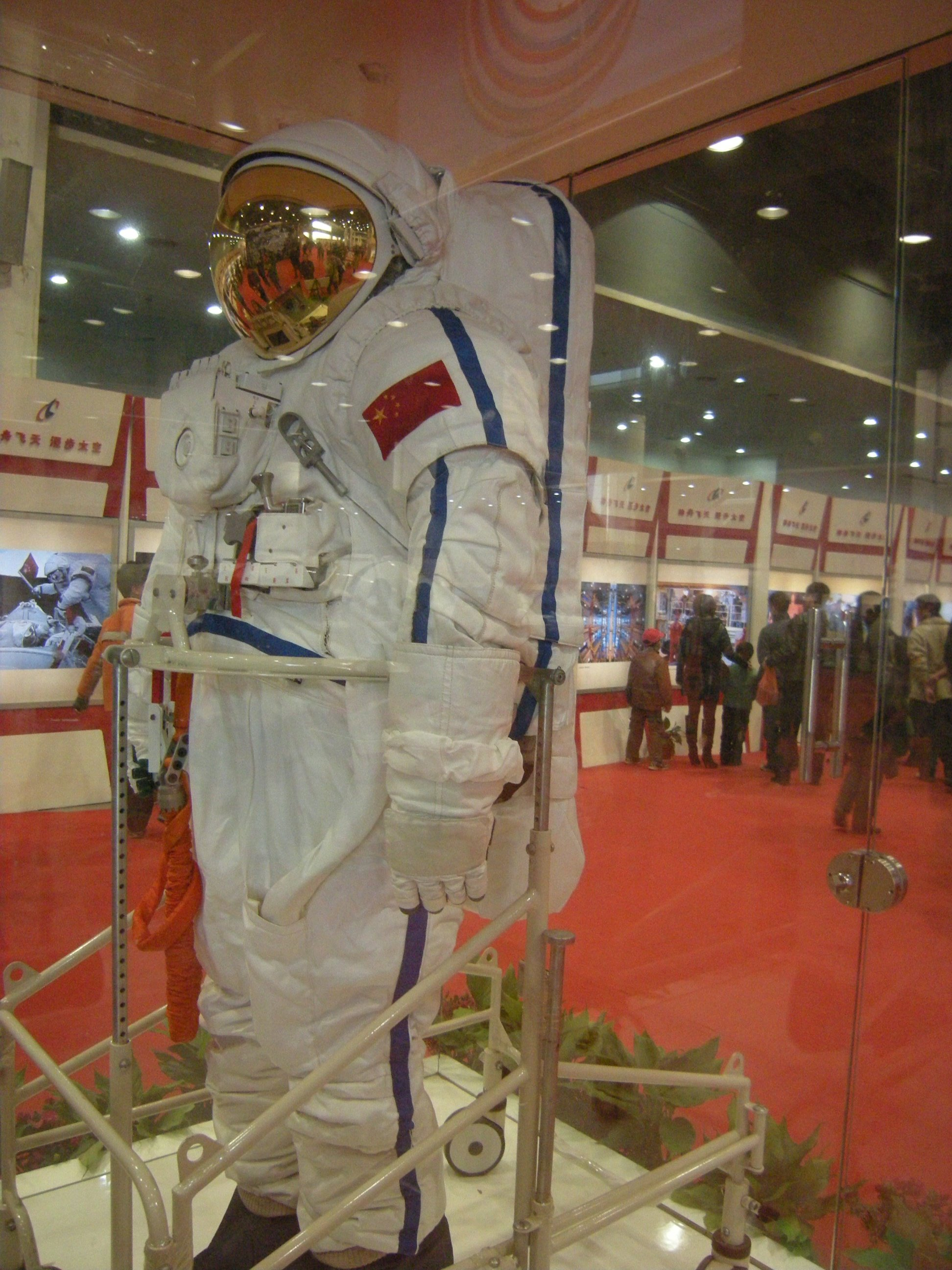

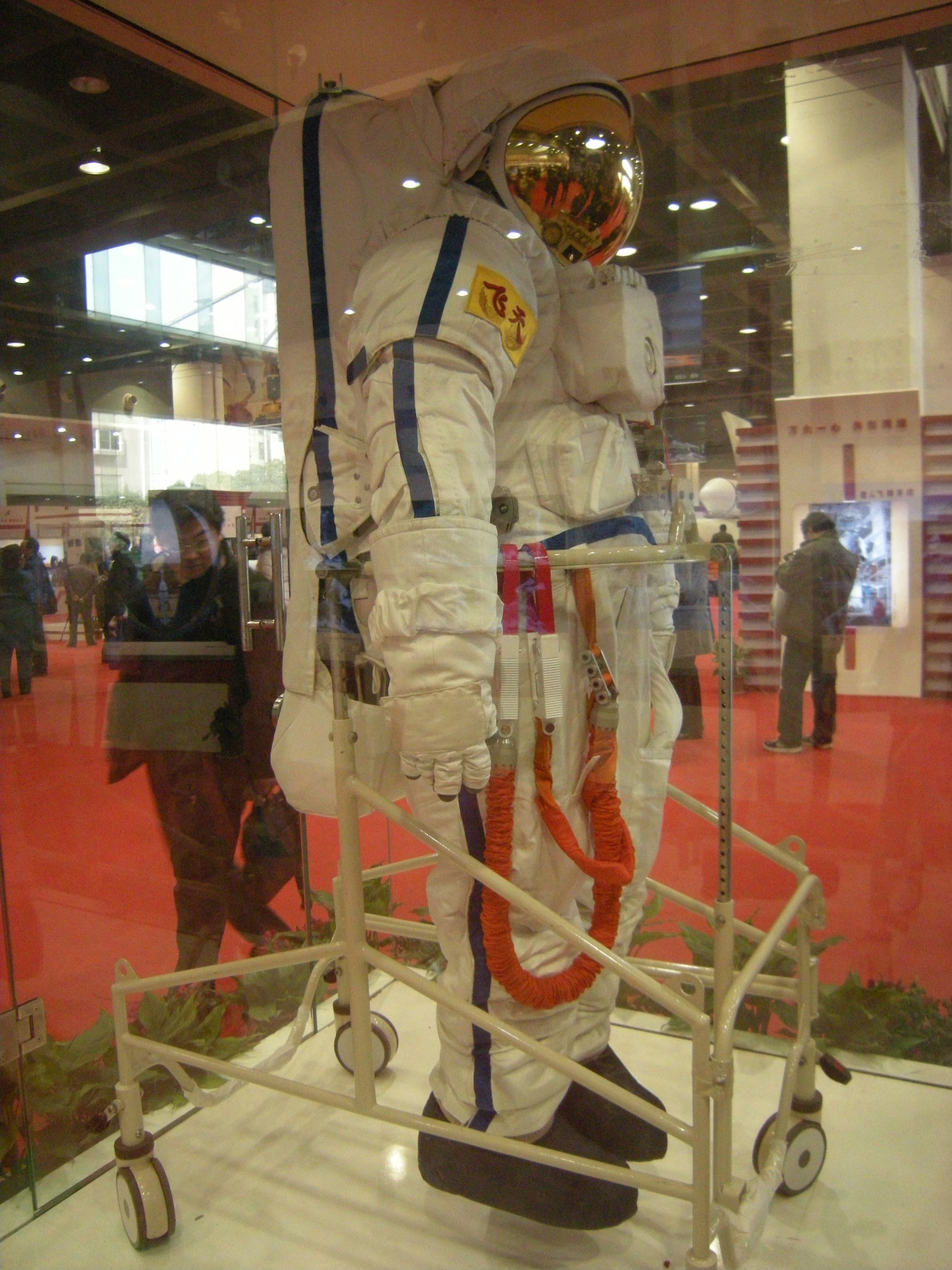

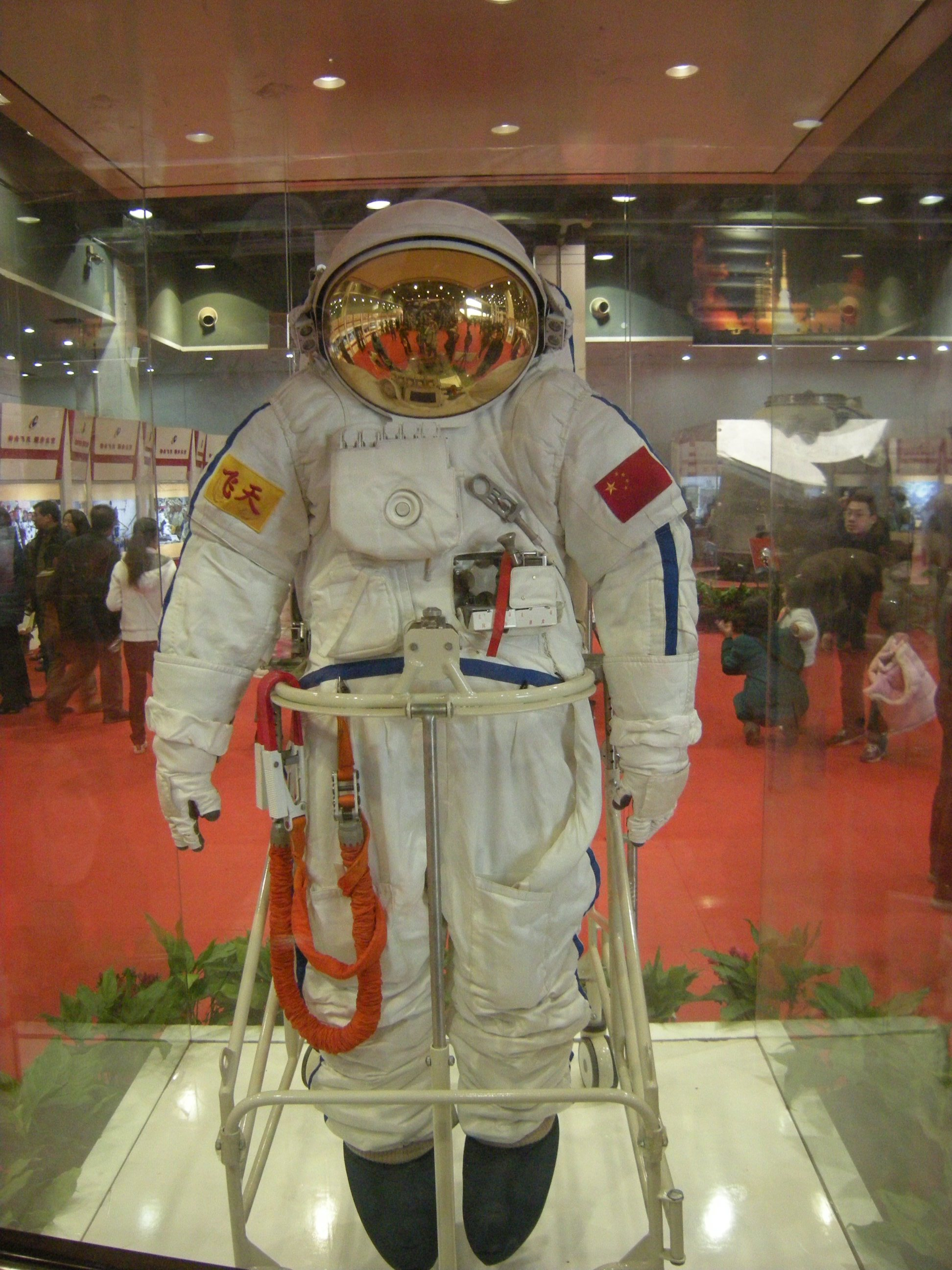

=== Second generation ===
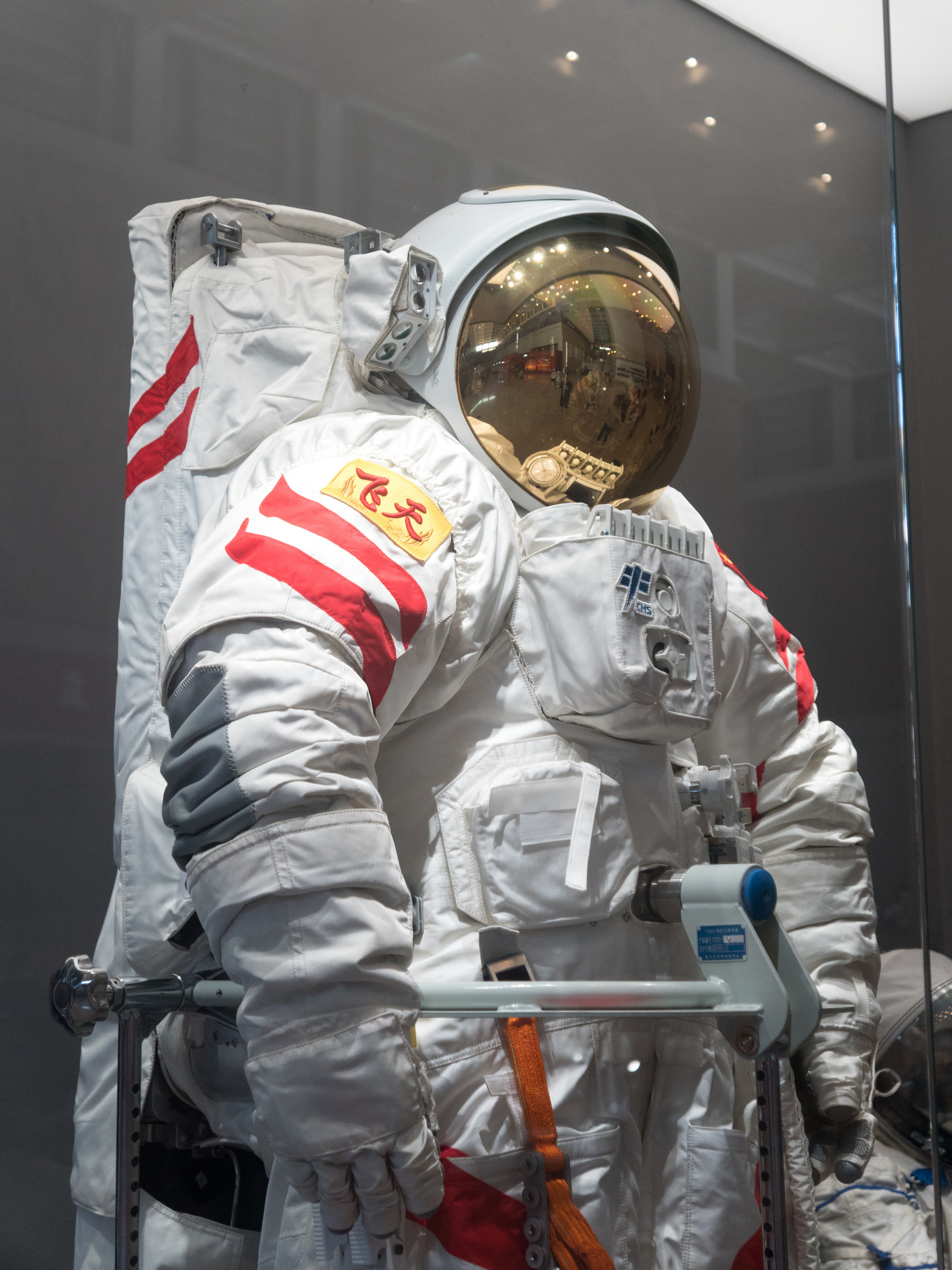

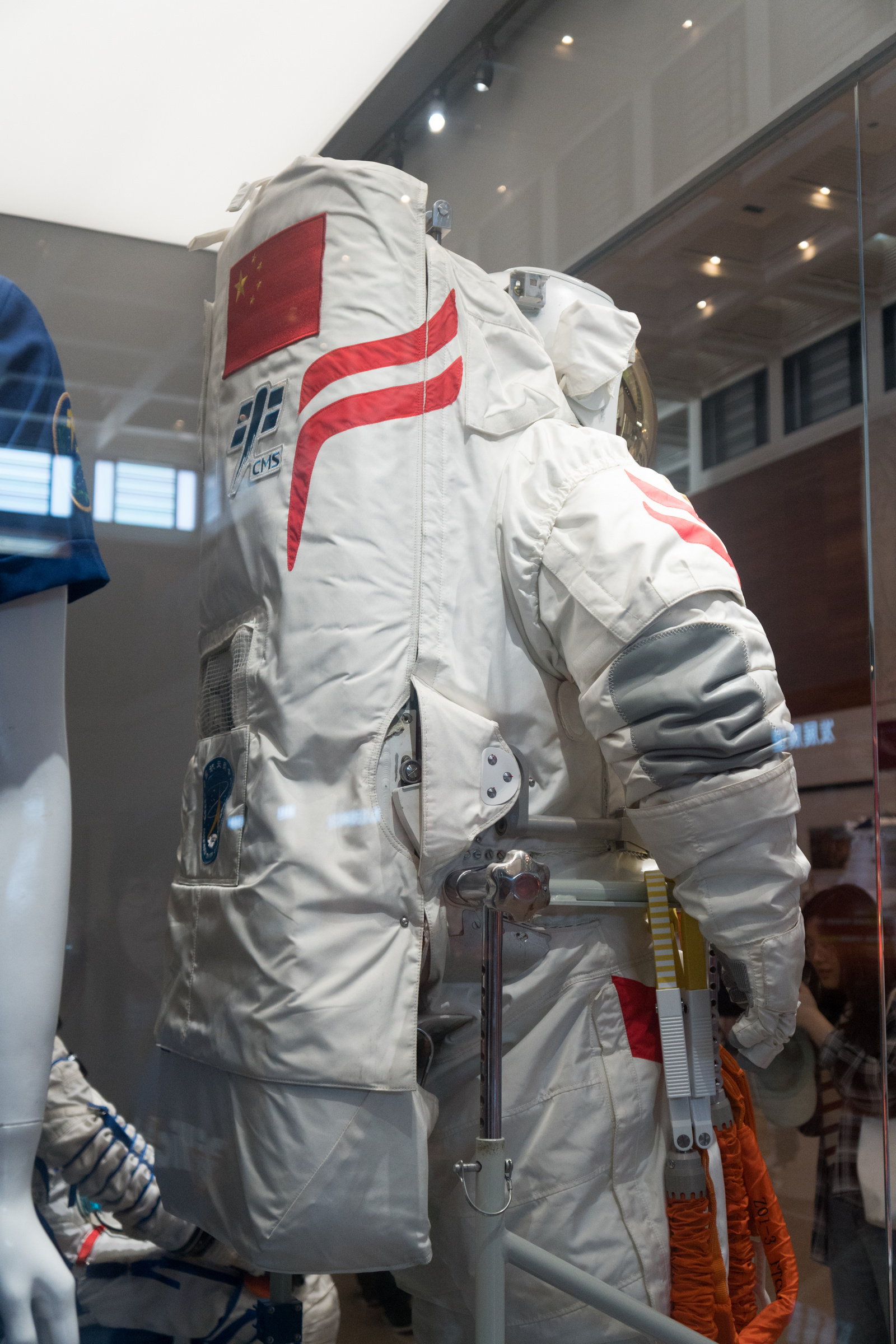

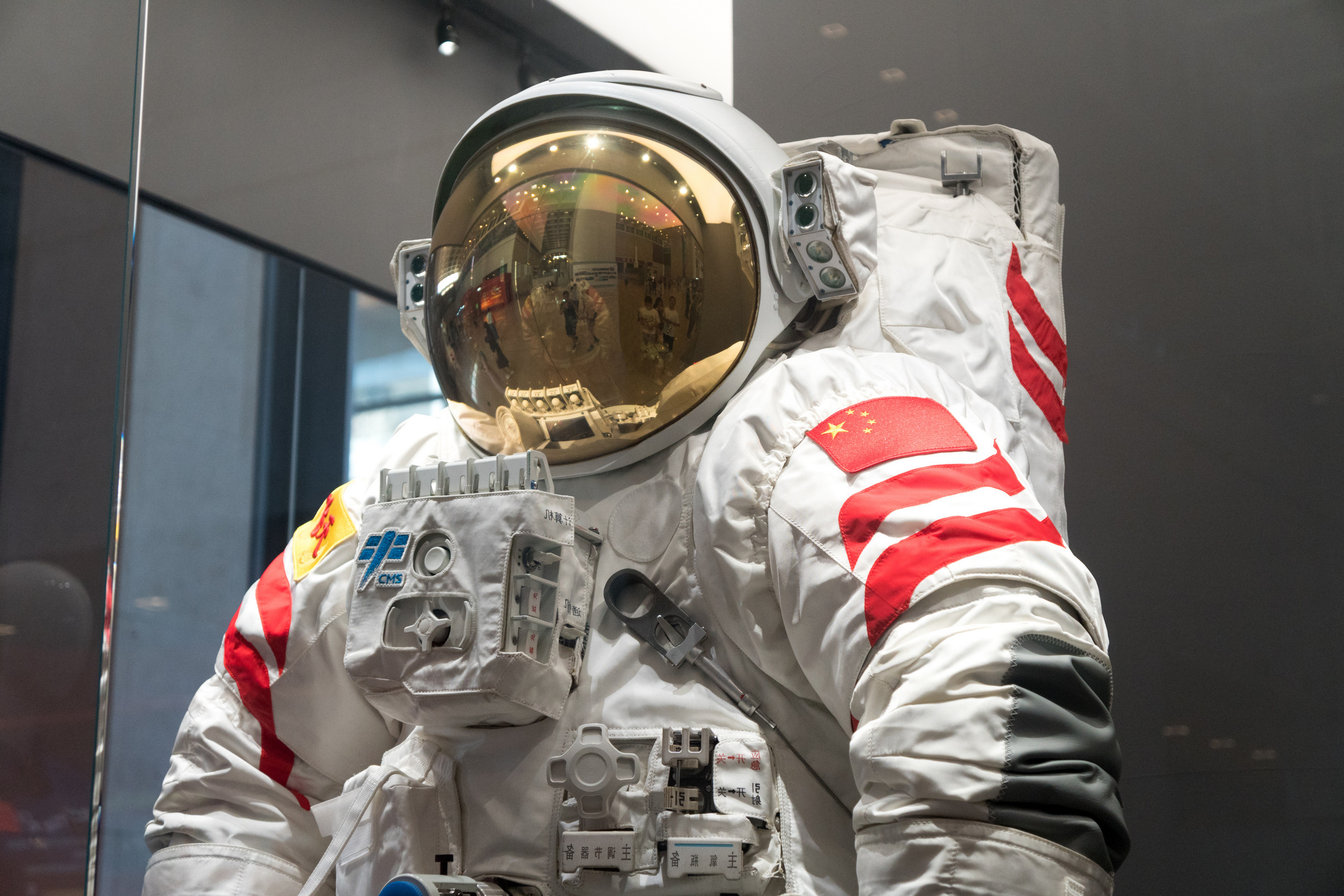

== See also ==
- Shenzhou 7
- Tiangong space station
- List of Tiangong space station spacewalks
- China's lunar EVA spacesuit
