= Liu Boming (taikonaut) =

Chinese major general and taikonaut (born 1966)

- 刘伯明
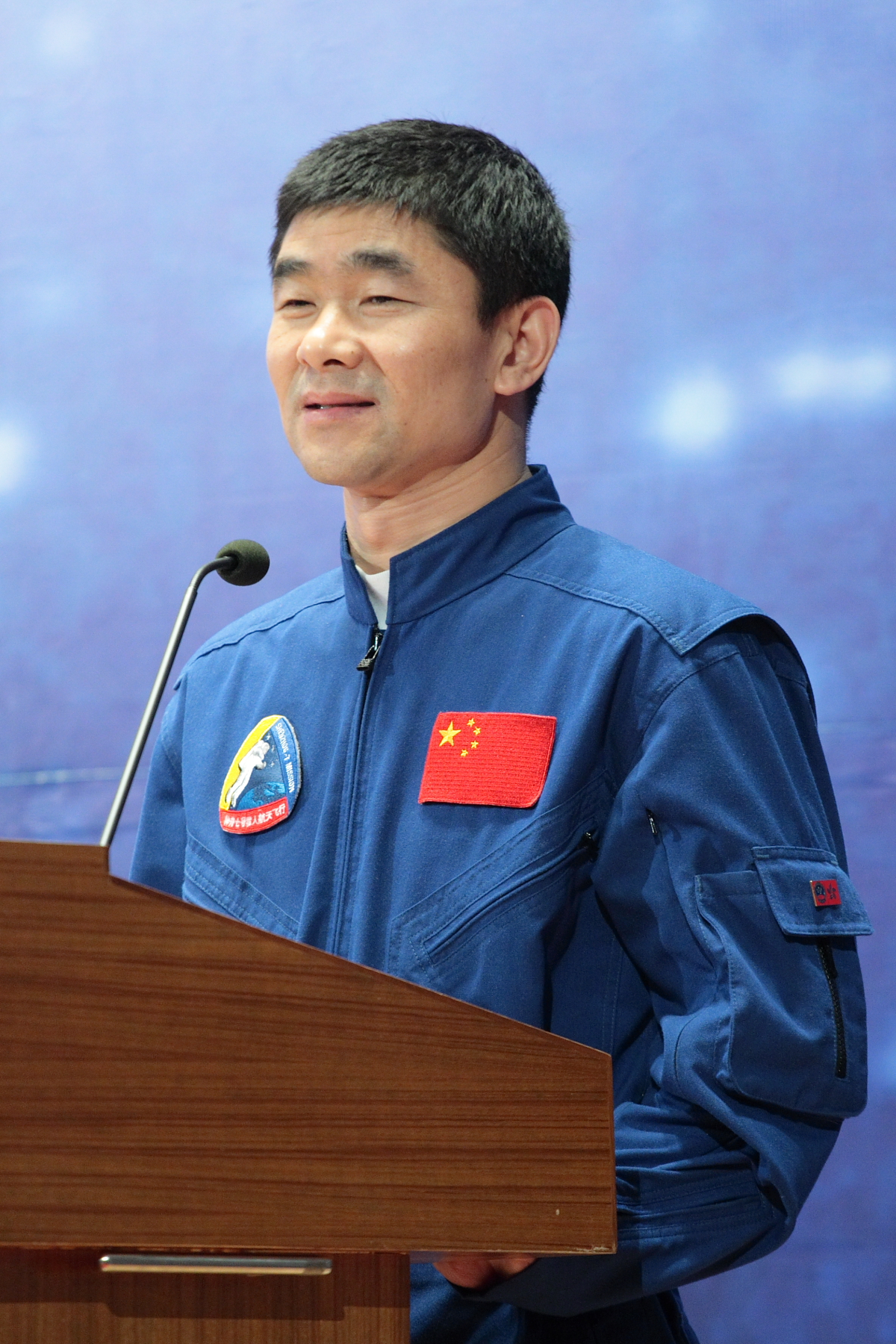
- Liu Boming speaking at the Chinese University of Hong Kong
- Born: 17 September 1966 (age 60); Nenjiang, Heilongjiang, China
- Education: PLA Air Force Changchun Flight College
- Space career

PLAAC astronaut
- Previous occupation: Fighter pilot, People's Liberation Army Air Force
- Rank: Major general, People's Liberation Army Strategic Support Force
- Time in space: 95 days, 38 minutes
- Selection: Chinese Group 1 (1998)
- Total EVAs: 3
- Total EVA time: 13 hours, 3 minutes
- Missions: Shenzhou 7 Shenzhou 12

Liu Boming (simplified Chinese: 刘伯明; traditional Chinese: 劉伯明; pinyin: Liú Bómíng; born 17 September 1966) is a major general in the Chinese People's Liberation Army Strategic Support Force (PLASSF). A fighter pilot in the PLA Air Force (PLAAF), he was selected into the PLA Astronaut Corps (PLAAC) in 1998. A Shenzhou 7 veteran, he also worked on the Tiangong space station during the Shenzhou 12 mission from June to September 2021.

With a combined total of three EVA's performed, he spent some 13 hours walking in space which is currently the record by a Chinese astronaut.

== Astronaut Corps career ==
Liu, along with Zhai Zhigang and Jing Haipeng, was chosen to be the main crew of Shenzhou 7, with Zhai as commander, on 17 September 2008. On 25 September, at 21:10 CST, they launched into space as China's third human spaceflight mission, and the first Chinese mission ever to have a three-man crew. Liu and Zhai participated in China's first-ever space walk.

Liu wore a Russian Orlan-M spacesuit, while Zhai wore the Chinese-made Feitian space suit. Liu remained in the open portal of the orbital module, assisting Zhai on his spacewalk; later in the space walk, Liu also performed a stand-up extra-vehicular activity, partially leaving the orbital module in order to hand Zhai a Chinese flag. After the spacewalk, Liu said in an interview that his inspiration and idols have always been Neil Armstrong and Yuri Gagarin.

In 2018, he became a PhD candidate at Beijing Institute of Technology.

On 17 June 2021, Liu flew on Shenzhou 12 as his second spaceflight, becoming one of the three initial crew members to enter the Tiangong space station. On 4 July 2021, Liu and Tang Hongbo, another crew member of Shenzhou 12, completed the first extravehicular activity of the Tiangong space station. On 20 August 2021, Liu and mission commander Nie Haisheng carried out the second extravehicular activity of the space station, making him the first Chinese national to perform extravehicular activities multiple times.

== See also ==
- List of Chinese astronauts
- Chinese space programme
