= Fei Junlong =

Chinese taikonaut and fighter pilot (born 1965)

- 费俊龙
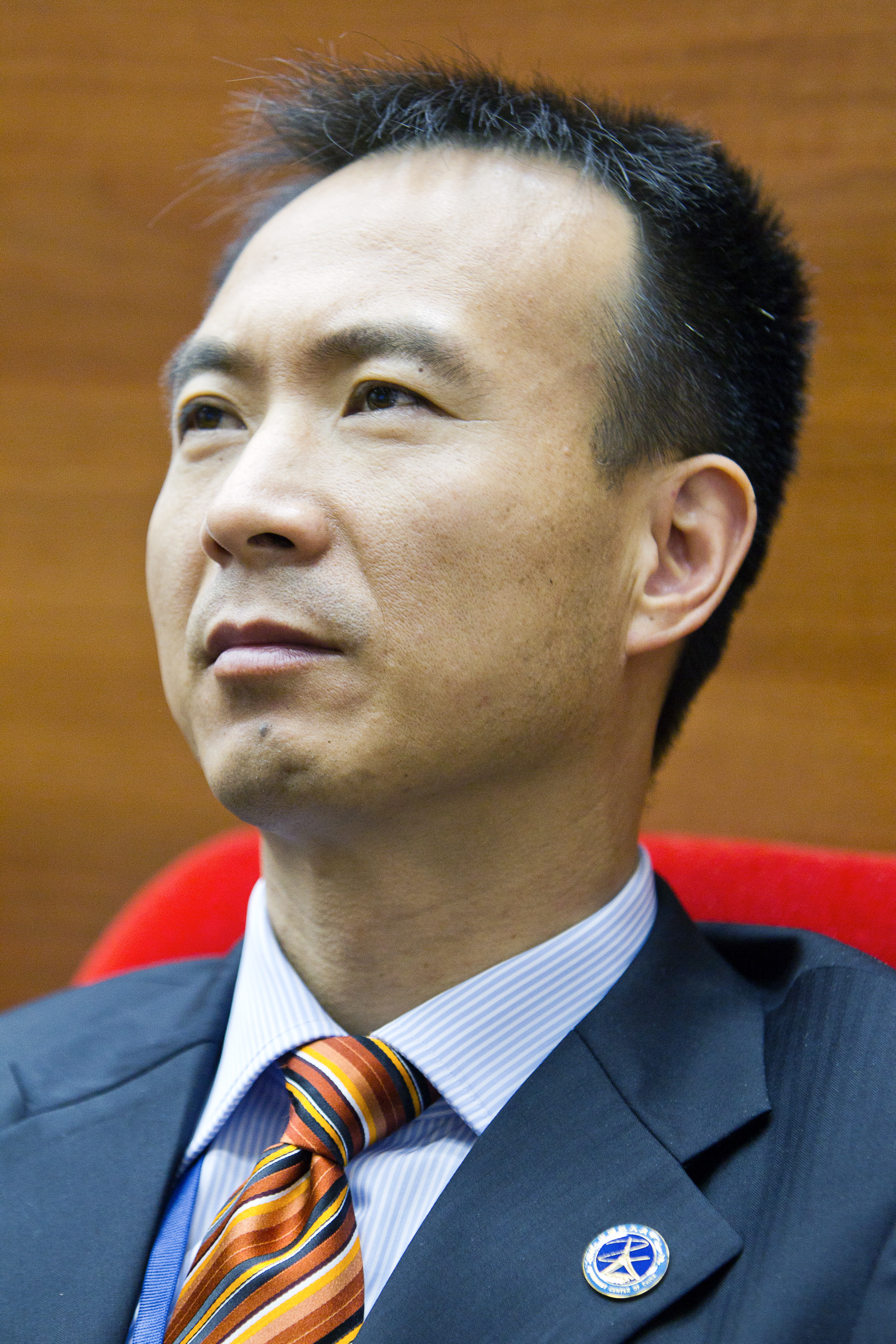
- Fei Junlong at 24th Planetary Congress of Association of Space Explorers, Moscow, BMSTU, September 6, 2011
- Born: May 5, 1965 (age 61); Suzhou, Jiangsu
- Occupation: Fighter pilot
- Space career

PLAAC astronaut
- Rank: Major general, PLASSF
- Time in space: 191 days, 2 hours, 58 minutes
- Selection: Chinese Group 1 (1998)
- Total EVAs: 4
- Total EVA time: 29 hours, 56 minutes
- Missions: Shenzhou 6 Shenzhou 15

Chinese name
- Simplified Chinese: 费俊龙
- Traditional Chinese: 費俊龍
Transcriptions
Standard Mandarin
- Hanyu Pinyin: Fèi Jùnlóng

Fei Junlong (Chinese: 费俊龙; pinyin: Fèi Jùnlóng; born 5 May 1965) is a Chinese military pilot and taikonaut. He was the commander of Shenzhou 6, the second crewed spaceflight of China's space program, and was selected as commander for the Shenzhou 15 mission to the Tiangong space station.

== Early life ==
He was born in a rural village in Kunshan, Jiangsu province of China to a family of farmers and was recruited from high school by the People's Liberation Army Air Force (PLAAF) in 1982 at the age of 17. He graduated with excellent marks from the PLAAF's No. 9 Aviation School, the Changchun No.1 Flight College of the PLA Air Force and Flight Training School of the Air Force. In the PLAAF, he was a pilot, flight trainer and flight technology inspector.

== Spaceflight career ==
Fei was selected for the CNSA astronaut program in 1998. He was in the final five selected for China's first crewed space flight, Shenzhou 5. He was the commander on the Shenzhou 6 flight that launched October 12, 2005, with Nie Haisheng serving as flight engineer. They landed on October 17, 2005.

Fei is also a member of Shenzhou 15's 3-person crew on a 6-months mission to Tiangong space station. The mission launched on 29 November 2022, arriving at the station about seven hours later.

== Personal life ==
He married Wang Jie (王洁) in 1991 and has one son. His father-in-law was a veteran of the Korean War and later became an aerospace researcher, and his mother-in-law was a teacher. His son Fei Di (费迪) is also a member of the Shenzhou spacecraft development team. During his personal time he dabbles in fine arts.

== Awards and honors ==
- Command Pilot of PLAAF, 1982
- Merit Citation Class II, 1996
- Chinese May 4 Medal for Youth Having Outstanding Contributions, 2005
- Aerospace Achievement Medal, 2005
- The honorary title of "Space Hero", 2005
- Top 10 Inspirational Models of China, 2006
- Asteroid 9512 Feijunlong, 2007
- Honorary Professor of Nanjing Audit University, 2011
- Honorary Member of Chinese Society of Astronautics, 2012

The asteroid 9512 Feijunlong was named after him.

== See also ==
- List of Chinese astronauts
- Chinese space programme
