= Banxing =

Chinese technology development satellite

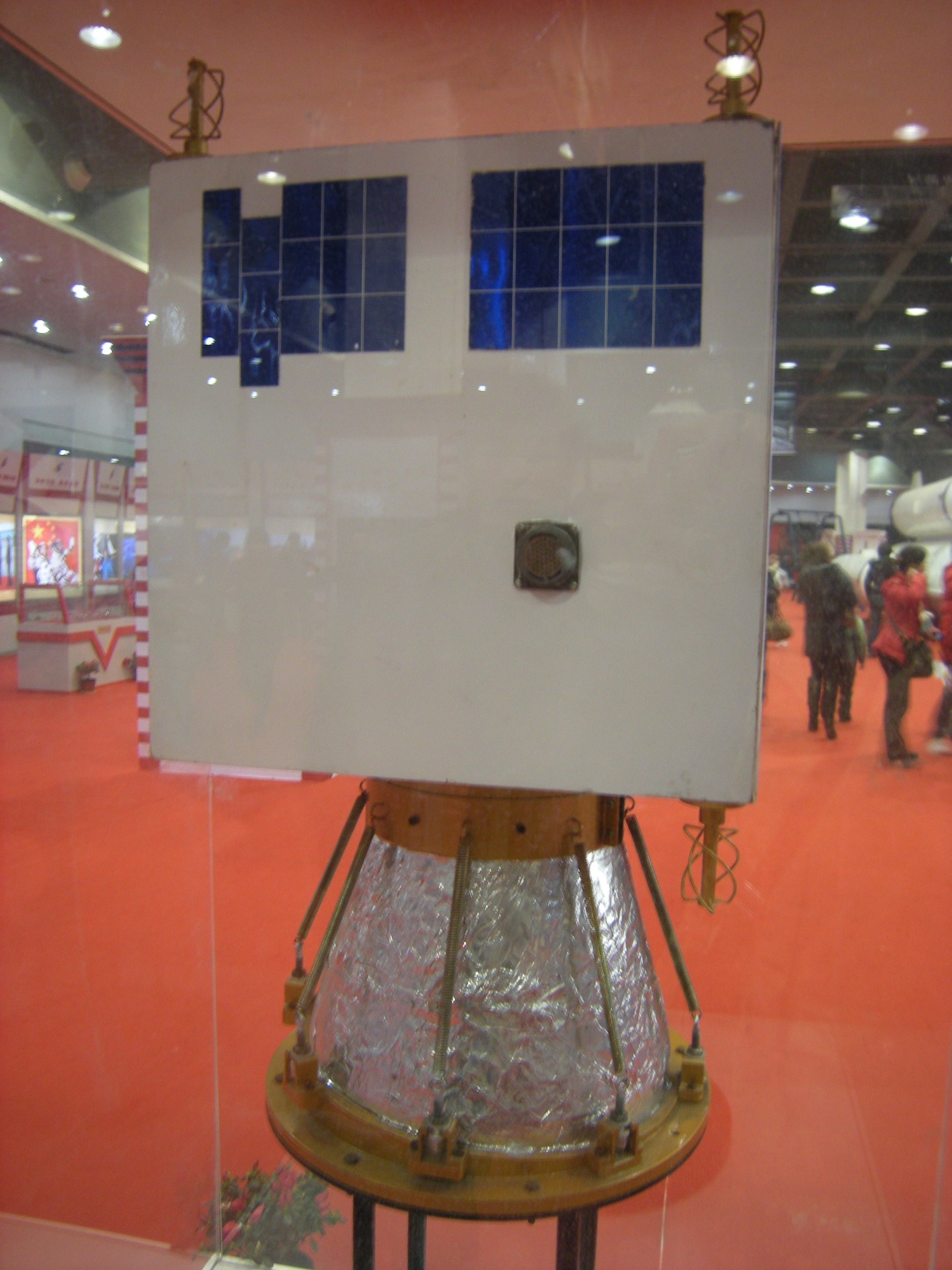
- Small satellite with shenzhou 7 (model）
- Mission type: Spacecraft imaging Technology
- Operator: CASC
- COSPAR ID: 2008-047G
- SATCAT no.: 33392

Spacecraft properties
- Launch mass: 40 kilograms (88 lb)

Start of mission
- Launch date: 25 September 2008, 13:10 UTC
- Rocket: Chang Zheng 2F
- Launch site: Jiuquan LA-4/SLS-1
- Deployed from: Shenzhou 7
- Deployment date: 27 September 2008, 11:27 UTC

Orbital parameters
- Reference system: Geocentric
- Regime: Low Earth
- Inclination: 42.4 degrees

Banxing, also known as BX-1, was a Chinese technology-demonstration satellite deployed from the Shenzhou 7 spacecraft on 27 September 2008. Weighing approximately 40 kilograms, it carried two cameras and communication equipment and was equipped with an ammonia gas-based propulsion system. Its primary purpose was to relay images of Shenzhou 7. After the spacecraft re-entered Earth's atmosphere, Banxing remained in orbit and participated in a formation-flying experiment with the detached Shenzhou orbital module.

== Description ==
Banxing or BX-1 (Chinese: 伴星; lit. 'Companion Satellite'), is a small Chinese technology development satellite which was deployed from the Shenzhou 7 spacecraft at 11:27 GMT on 27 September 2008.

According to a paper presented at the 2009 Small Satellite Conference, the satellite was developed by the Chinese Academy of Sciences and had two tasks: capturing images of Shenzhou 7 and demonstrating companion-flying technology. It was released about two hours after Zhai Zhigang's spacewalk, the first by a Chinese astronaut. Its two cameras could take clear images at distances of 4 m to 2 km, and about 20 minutes after release it began taking video and images of the spacecraft.

During the mission it flew around Shenzhou 7 at distances of tens to hundreds of metres, and after the astronauts returned to Earth it orbited the empty orbital module at a distance of one to two hundred kilometres, according to testimony given at a 2015 hearing of the US-China Economic and Security Review Commission. NASA's catalogue says it moved several kilometres away and tested constellation flight and station-keeping with the orbital module for several months after the mission. The satellite was initially in an orbit of about 328 by 338 km and decayed on 29 October 2009.

== Purpose ==
Banxing was used to relay images of the Shenzhou 7 spacecraft. Weighing some 40 kilograms, and containing two cameras and communication equipment, it was maneuvered using an ammonia gas-based propulsion system. Following the re-entry of Shenzhou 7, Banxing remained in orbit as part of a formation-flying experiment with the discarded Shenzhou orbital module.

A few hours after Banxing was launched it and the Shenzhou 7 orbital module passed unusually close to the International Space Station. This provoked some speculation that the experiment was intended to test military anti-satellite interception technology.

== See also ==
- 2008 in spaceflight
- Orbital Express
