= Wang Yongzhi =

Chinese aerospace engineer (1932–2024)

- 王永志
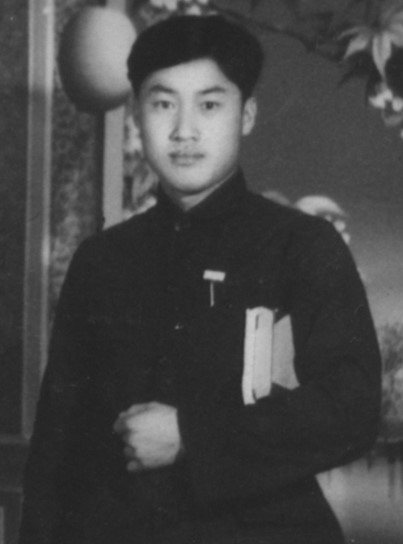
- Born: 17 November 1932; Changtu County, Manchukuo
- Died: 11 June 2024 (aged 91)
- Education: Tsinghua University; Moscow Aviation Institute
- Awards: Highest Science and Technology Award (2003)
- Scientific career
- Fields: Space technology

Chinese name
- Simplified Chinese: 王永志
- Traditional Chinese: 王永誌
Transcriptions
Standard Mandarin
- Hanyu Pinyin: Wáng Yǒngzhì

Wang Yongzhi (Chinese: 王永志; 17 November 1932 – 11 June 2024) was a Chinese aerospace scientist and academician at the Chinese Academy of Engineering and a commissioner of the 11th National People's Political Consultative Conference. He is notable for serving as the general architect and designer of China's Shenzhou program from 1992 to 2006 overseeing the first six Shenzhou missions. In 2003, he was awarded the nation's highest scientific and technological prize, State Preeminent Science and Technology Award, by President Hu Jintao. Wang Yongzhi graduated from Moscow Aviation Institute in 1961. Wang died on 11 June 2024, at the age of 91.

Wang was posthumously bestowed the Medal of the Republic, the highest honorary medal of the People's Republic of China, in September 2024.
