= People's Liberation Army General Armaments Department =

Chinese military body (1998–2020)

People's Liberation Army General Armaments Department (GAD; Chinese: 中国人民解放军总装备部) was in charge of equipping and arming the People's Liberation Army of China, as well as overseeing and improving military technology. Founded in April 1998, it was one of the four "general departments" that fell under the Central Military Commission. Various space launch sites across the country also fell under its jurisdiction.

The department was disbanded in January 2016 and the new agency, Equipment Development Department of the Central Military Commission was founded.

== Structure ==
Director

- General Zhang Youxia (from October 2012)

Deputy Directors

- Lt. General Liu Guozhi (from December 2010)
- Lt. General Zhang Yulin (from 2011)
- Lt. General Niu Hongguang (from July 2009)
- Lt. General Liu Sheng (from May 2012)
- Lt. General Wang Li

Political Commissar

- General Wang Hongyao (from July 2011)

Deputy Political Commissar

- Lt. General Chai Shaoliang (December 2014)

Discipline Inspection Department

Directly Subordinated Organs Work Department

- Liaison Department
- Organization Department
- Propaganda Department
- Security Department

=== Human spaceflight ===
The human spaceflight effort of the PRC used to be conducted by the China Manned Space Engineering Office, which was a special department within the General Armaments Department.

=== Counterspace ===
The GAD was also tasked with developing China's counterspace capabilities.

=== China Academy of Engineering Physics (CAEP) ===
In 1998, CAEP was placed under the department's purview.
