= Yang Liwei =

Chinese military officer and taikonaut (born 1965)

- 杨利伟
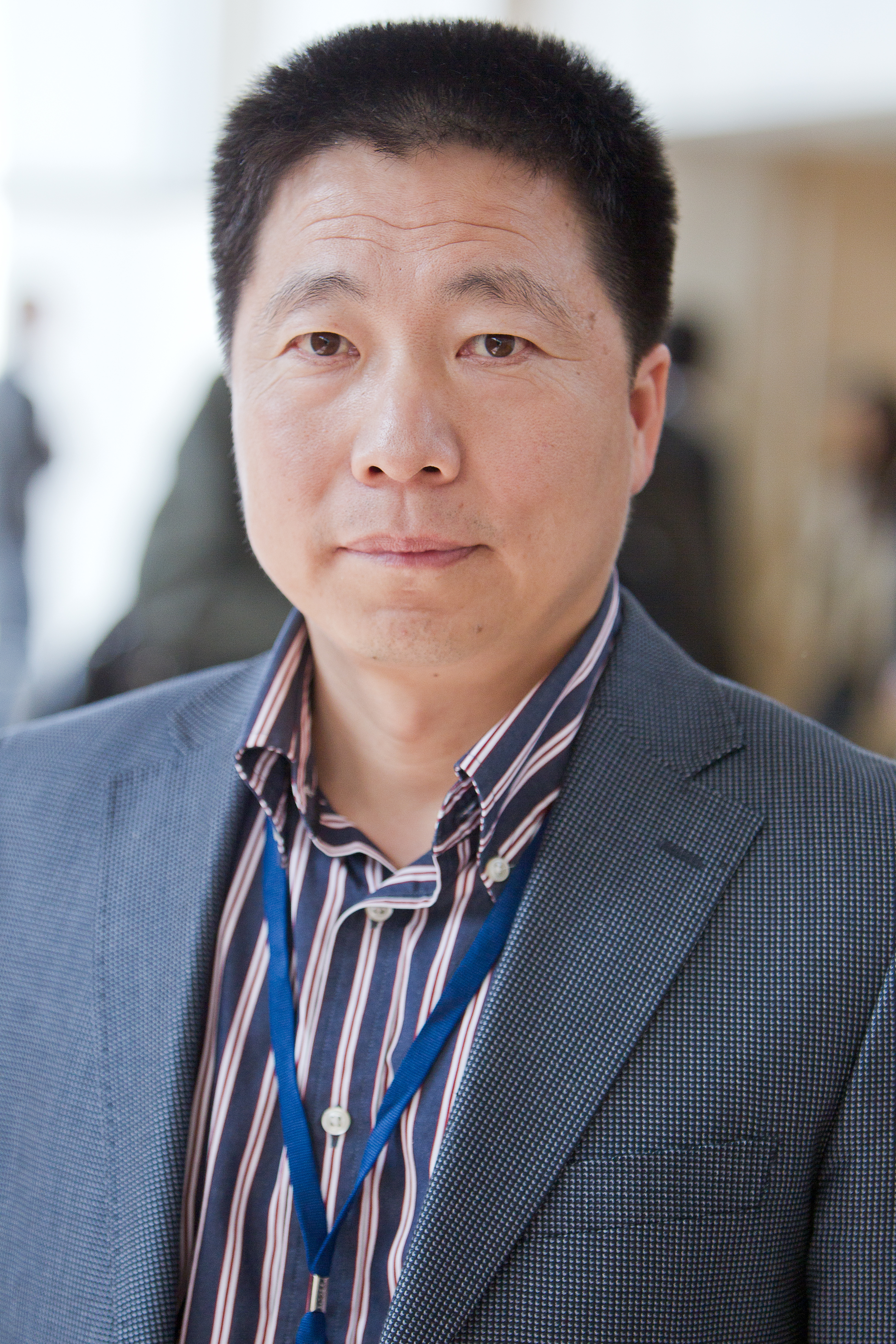
- Yang in September 2011
- Born: 21 June 1965 (age 61); Suizhong, Huludao, Liaoning, China
- Education: Air Force Aviation University (BEng); Tsinghua University (PhD)
- Space career

PLAAC astronaut
- Current occupation: Vice Chief Designer, China Manned Space Engineering
- Previous occupation: People's Liberation Army Air Force fighter pilot
- Status: Retired
- Rank: Major general
- Time in space: 21 hours, 22 minutes, 45 seconds
- Selection: Chinese Group 1 (1998)
- Missions: Shenzhou 5

Yang Liwei (simplified Chinese: 杨利伟; traditional Chinese: 楊利偉; born 21 June 1965) is a Chinese major general, former military pilot, and former taikonaut of the People's Liberation Army.

In October 2003, Yang became the first person sent into space by the Chinese space program. This mission, Shenzhou 5, made China the third country to independently send humans into space. He is currently a vice chief designer of China Manned Space Engineering.

== Early life and education ==
Yang Liwei was born in Suizhong County, Huludao, Liaoning. His mother was a teacher and his father was an accountant at a state agricultural firm. Yang Liwei married Zhang Yumei with whom they had a son together. Zhang Yumei was a part of the People's Liberation Army and was a teacher in China's Space Program.

In 1983, he enlisted for the People's Liberation Army (PLA) and was admitted to the Air Force Second Flight Academy (空军第二飞行学院), graduating in 1987 with a bachelor's degree. He participated in the screening process for astronauts in 1996. In the PLAAF, he logged 1,350 hours of flight time as a fighter pilot before he went to space training.

Yang entered Tsinghua University in Beijing for doctoral studies in 2004 and received a Doctor of Philosophy in Management in 2009.

== Spaceflight career ==
Yang was selected as a taikonaut candidate in 1998 and has trained for space flight since then. He was chosen from the final pool of 14 candidates to fly on China's first crewed space mission. A former fighter pilot in the Aviation Military Unit of the PLA, he held the rank of Lieutenant Colonel at the time of his mission. He was promoted to full Colonel on 20 October 2003. According to the Youth Daily, the decision had been made in advance of his spaceflight without Yang being made aware of it.

The launch window of Shenzhou 5, was chosen to be 15 October 2003 because it would coincide with the conclusion of the Chinese Communist Party (CCP) conference in Beijing and a day before CCP General Secretary Hu Jintao's visit to Thailand for the Asia-Pacific Economic Cooperation (APEC) summit. Hu Jintao was present at the launch site to supervise the launch of Shenzhou 5. The launch was not broadcast on live television to prevent negative publicity in the event of a disaster.

He was launched into space aboard his Shenzhou 5 spacecraft atop a Long March 2F rocket from Jiuquan Satellite Launch Center in the Gobi Desert at 09:00 CST (01:00 UTC) on 15 October 2003. Prior to his launch almost nothing was made public about the Chinese taikonaut candidates; his selection for the Shenzhou 5 launch was only leaked to the media one day before the launch. The other two potential candidates for the space mission were Nie Haisheng and Zhai Zhigang who were also on standby as backup crews on the day of the launch.

Yang Liwei reported the occurrence of abnormal vibrations two minutes after launch which he described as "very uncomfortable". The vibrations were later discovered to have come from the launcher rocket. As a consequence, corrective measures were swiftly taken to the design of the following CZ-2F carrier rocket for the Shenzhou-6.

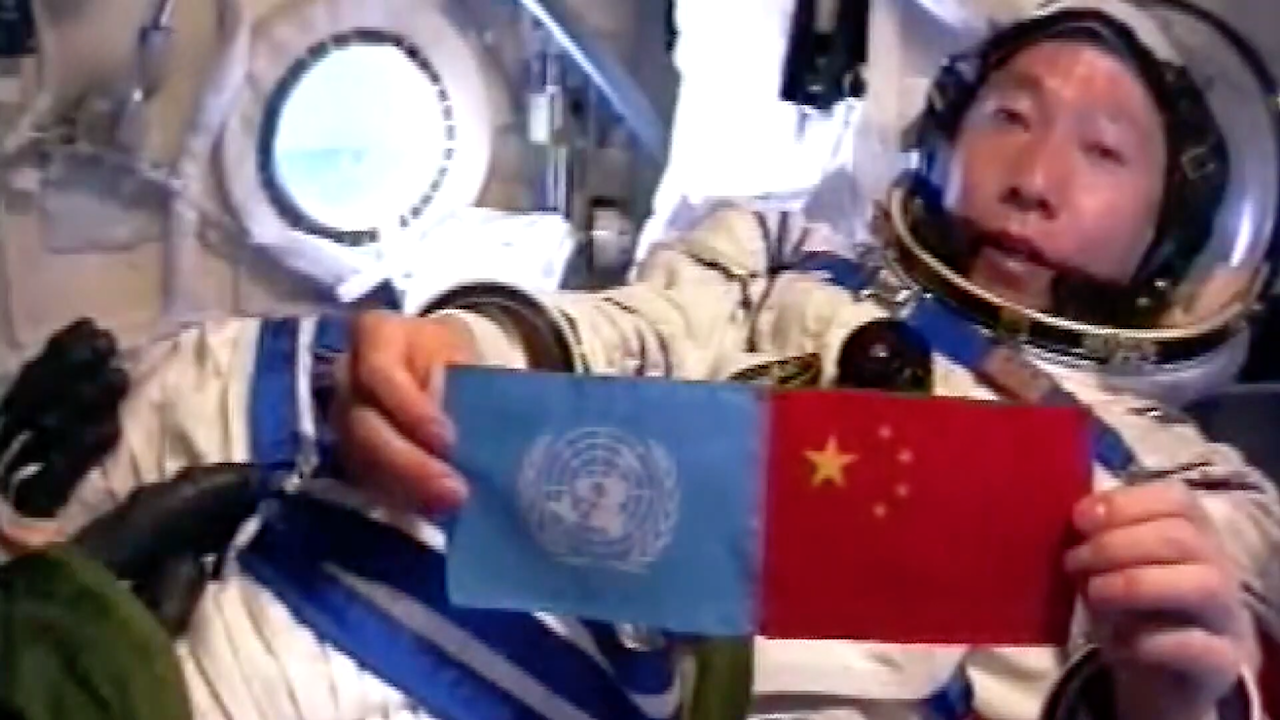
Liwei displays China and UN flags in flight

Yang punctuated his journey with regular updates on his condition; variations of "I feel good", the last coming as the capsule floated to the ground after re-entry. He spoke to his wife as the Shenzhou 5 started its eighth orbit around the Earth, assuring her from space: "I feel very good, don't worry". He ate specially designed packets of shredded pork with garlic, Kung Pao chicken and eight treasure rice, along with Chinese herbal tea. During the flight, Yang slept two times in 3-hour intervals. In the middle of the journey, state television broadcast footage of Yang waving a small flag of the People's Republic of China and that of the United Nations inside his capsule.

State media said Yang's capsule was supplied with a gun, a knife and tent in case he landed in the wrong place.

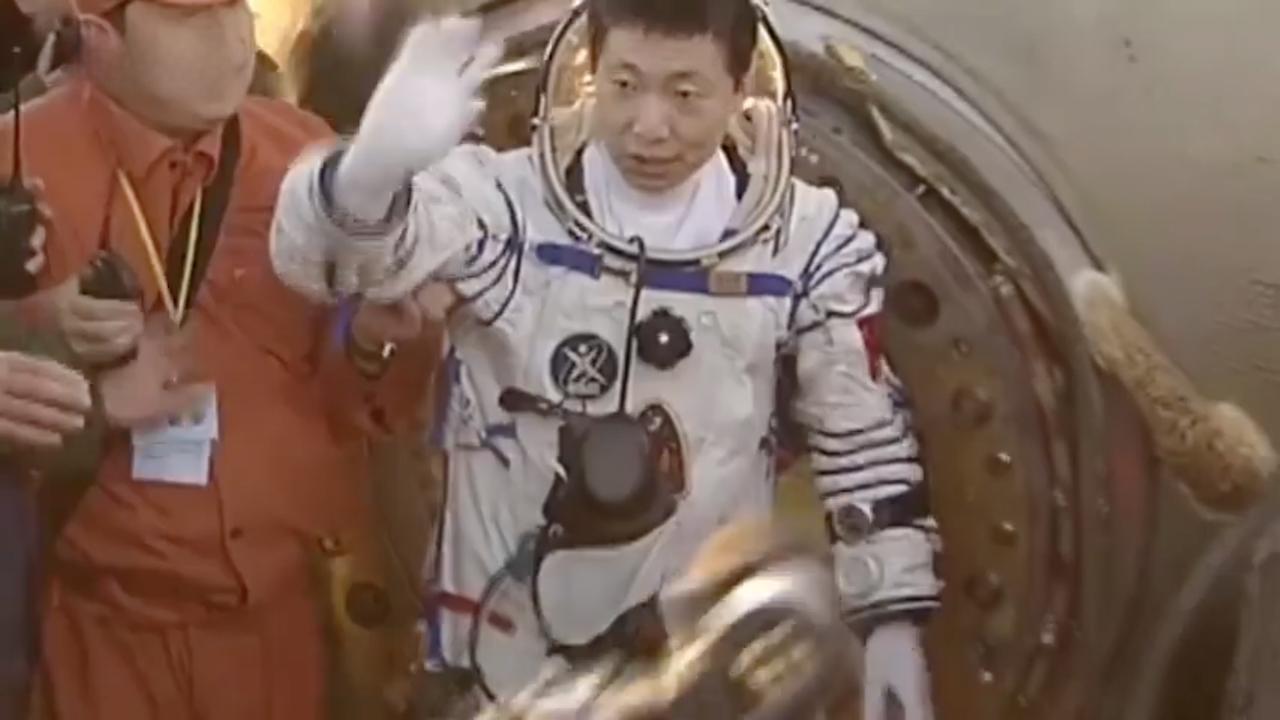
Liwei waving after being helped out of the return capsule

Yang's craft landed in the grasslands of the Chinese region of Inner Mongolia at around 06:30 CST on 16 October 2003 (22:00 UTC), having completed 14 orbits and travelled more than 600,000 kilometres (370,000 mi). Yang was in space for a total of 21 hours, 22 minutes and 45 seconds. Yang left the capsule about 15 minutes after landing, and was congratulated by Chinese Premier Wen Jiabao. But the astronaut's bleeding lips seen in the official images broadcast sparked rumors of a hard landing confirmed by accounts of personnel present at the landing site.

Although the first Chinese citizen in space, Yang Liwei is not the first person of Chinese origin in space. Shanghai-born Taylor Wang flew on Space Shuttle mission STS-51-B in 1985. Wang, however, had become a United States citizen in 1975. Taylor Wang was not the first person born in China to go to orbit. William Anders was born in Hong Kong on 17 October 1933. Anders would be a part of the Apollo 8 lunar orbital mission in 1968.

Yang visited Hong Kong on 31 October 2003, holding talks and sharing his experiences during a six-day stay in the territory. The visit coincided with an exhibition that featured his reentry capsule, spacesuit and leftover food from his 21-hour mission. On 5 November he travelled to Macau.

On 7 November, Yang received the title of "Space Hero" from Jiang Zemin, the Chairman of the CCP Central Military Commission (CMC). He also received a badge of honour during a ceremony at the Great Hall of the People. Russia awarded him the Gagarin medal. The Chinese University of Hong Kong has given Yang an honorary doctorate.

The asteroid 21064 Yangliwei and the fossil bird Dalingheornis liweii are named after him.

== After Shenzhou 5 ==
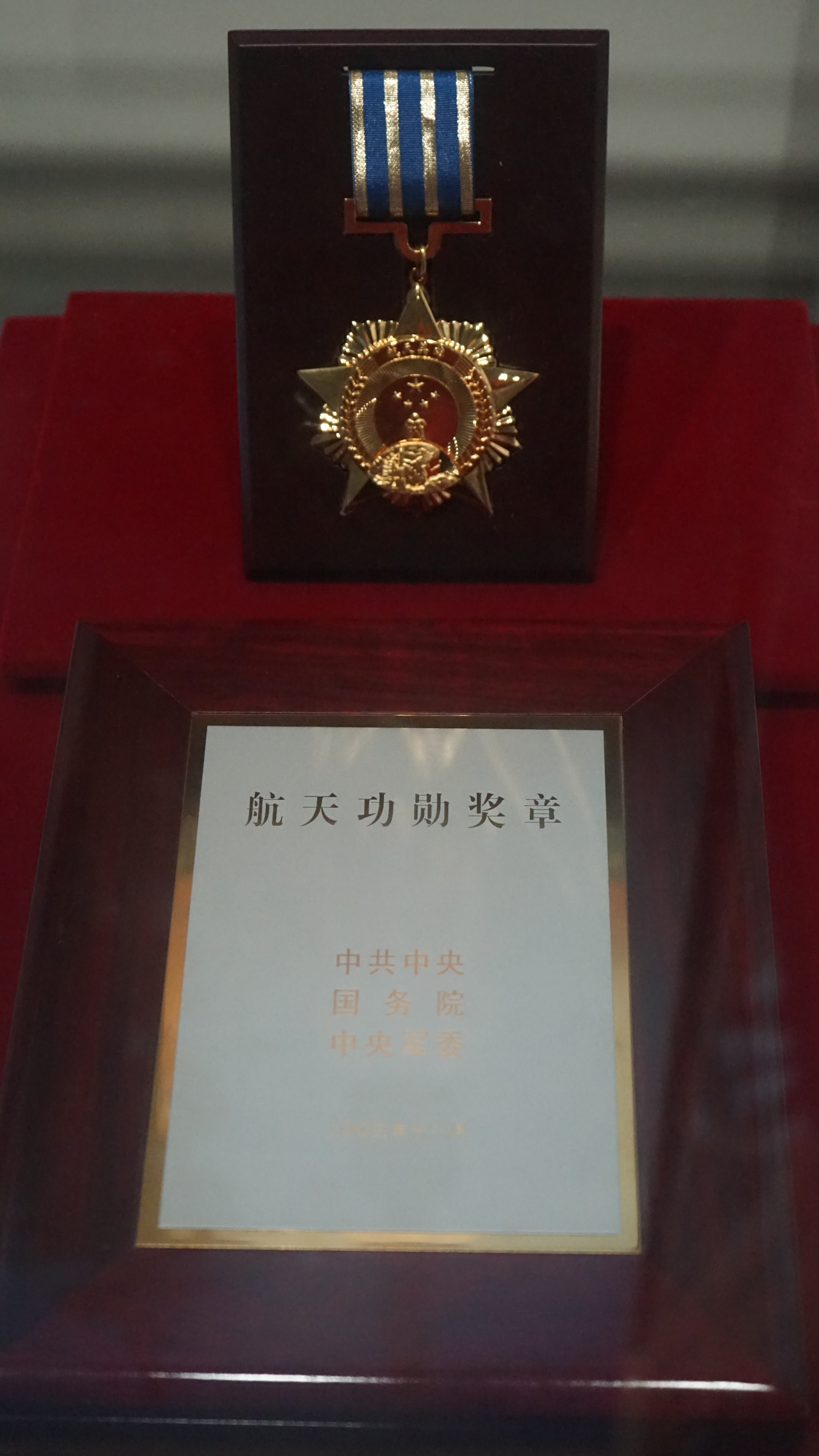
Yang's Space Meritorious Medal awarded by the Central Committee of the CCP, the State Council and the Central Military Commission

In a move similar to that taken by the Soviet Union with national space flight hero Yuri Gagarin, an official decision to no longer assign him to future spaceflight missions was made. Yang was promoted to Major General on 22 July 2008.

After the successful space flight of Shenzhou 5, Yang was given the position of vice-commander-in-chief of the astronauts system of China's crewed spaceflight project.

Yang became an alternate of the Central Committee of the Chinese Communist Party at the 17th Party Congress in October 2007.

The United Nations Educational, Scientific and Cultural Organization awarded the UNESCO Medal on Space Science to Yang in October 2017.

Yang Liwei is the director of the China Manned Space Engineering Office.

== See also ==
- Wan Hu
- List of Chinese astronauts
- Chinese space programme
