= Heung =

Heung is a name. People associated with this name include:

== Given name ==
- Heung Jin Moon (1966–1984), South Korean religious figure

== Surname ==
- Charles Heung (born 1948), Hong Kong film producer and former actor
- Jacky Heung (born 1984), Hong Kong actor, son of Charles Heung
- Anne Heung (born 1974), Hong Kong-born Canadian actress and model
- Chan Heung (1806–1875), Chinese martial artist, founder of the Choy Li Fut martial arts system
- Jimmy Heung (c. 1950 – 2014), Hong Kong film producer, director, and presenter, brother of Charles Heung

== Middle name ==
- Son Heung-min (born 1992), South Korean footballer
- Lazarus You Heung-sik (born 1951), South Korean cardinal, prelate of the Catholic Church

== See also ==
- Lin Heung Tea House, a Chinese restaurant
- Heung-boo: The Revolutionist, a 2018 South Korean historical drama film directed by Cho Geun-hyun
