= Yum cha =

Cantonese dining tradition

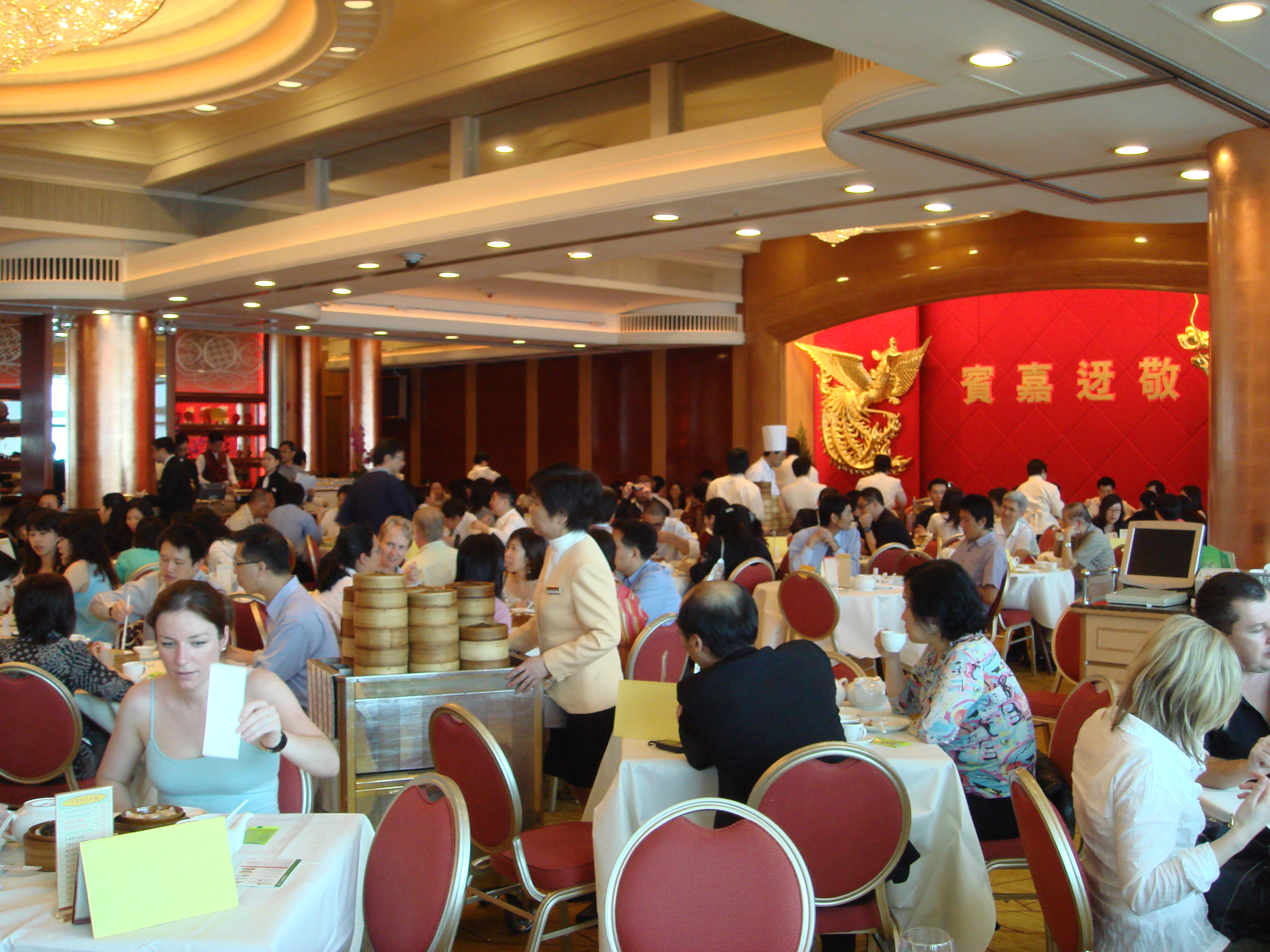
- Yum cha at Hong Kong City Hall
- Traditional Chinese: 飲茶
- Simplified Chinese: 饮茶
- Literal meaning: drink tea
Transcriptions
Standard Mandarin
- Hanyu Pinyin: yǐn chá
- Bopomofo: ㄧㄣˇ ㄔㄚˊ
- Wade–Giles: yin^{3} ch'a^{2}
- Tongyong Pinyin: yǐn chá
- IPA: [ìn.ʈʂʰǎ]
Hakka
- Romanization: yim tsa
Yue: Cantonese
- Yale Romanization: yám chàh
- Jyutping: jam2 caa4
- IPA: [jɐm˧˥.tsʰa˩]
Southern Min
- Hokkien POJ: ím-tê

Yum cha is the Cantonese tradition of breakfast or brunch involving Chinese tea and dim sum. The practice is popular in Cantonese-speaking regions, including Guangdong province, Guangxi province, Hong Kong, and Macau. It is also carried out in other regions worldwide where there are overseas Cantonese communities. Yum cha generally involves small portions of steamed, pan-fried, or deep-fried dim sum dishes served in bamboo steamers, which are designed to be eaten communally and washed down with hot tea. People often go to yum cha in large groups for family gatherings and celebrations.

== Description ==
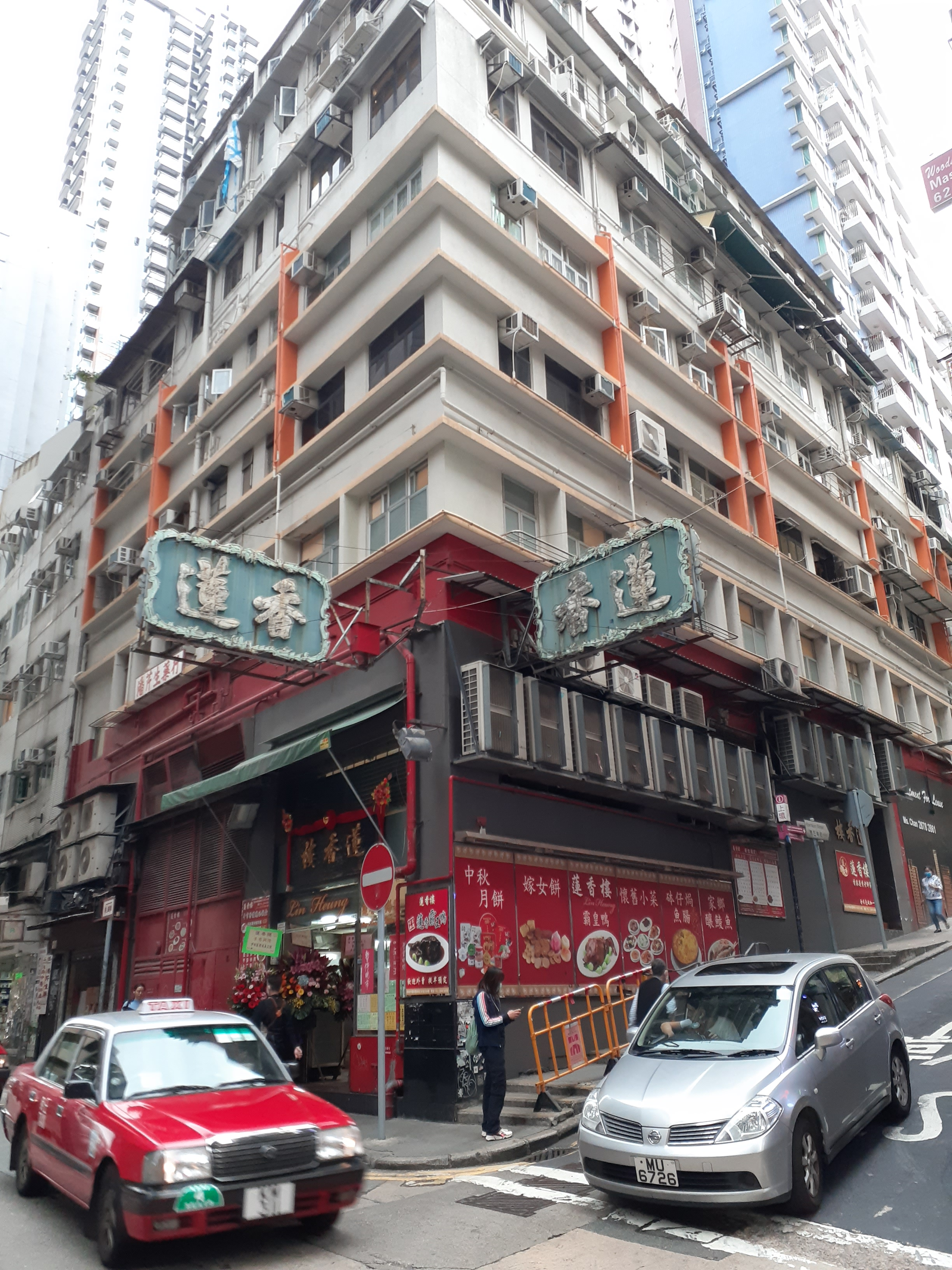
Founded in 1889, closed in 2022 and reopened in the same location in April 2024, Lin Heung Teahouse serves traditional dim sum in Central, Hong Kong.

Yum cha (traditional Chinese: 飲茶; simplified Chinese: 饮茶; pinyin: yǐn chá; Jyutping: jam2 caa4; Cantonese Yale: yám chà; lit. "drink tea"), also known as going for dim sum (Cantonese: 食點心), is the Cantonese tradition of brunch involving Chinese tea and dim sum. The practice is popular in Cantonese-speaking regions such as Guangdong, Guangxi, Hong Kong, and Macau. It is also carried out in other regions worldwide where there are overseas Chinese communities, like Vietnam, Australia, Canada, England and the United States.

Yum cha generally involves small portions of steamed, pan-fried, or deep-fried dim sum dishes served in bamboo steamers, which are designed to be eaten communally and washed down with hot tea. Traditionally, the elderly gather to eat dim sum after morning exercises. Many have yum cha with family during weekends and holiday gatherings.

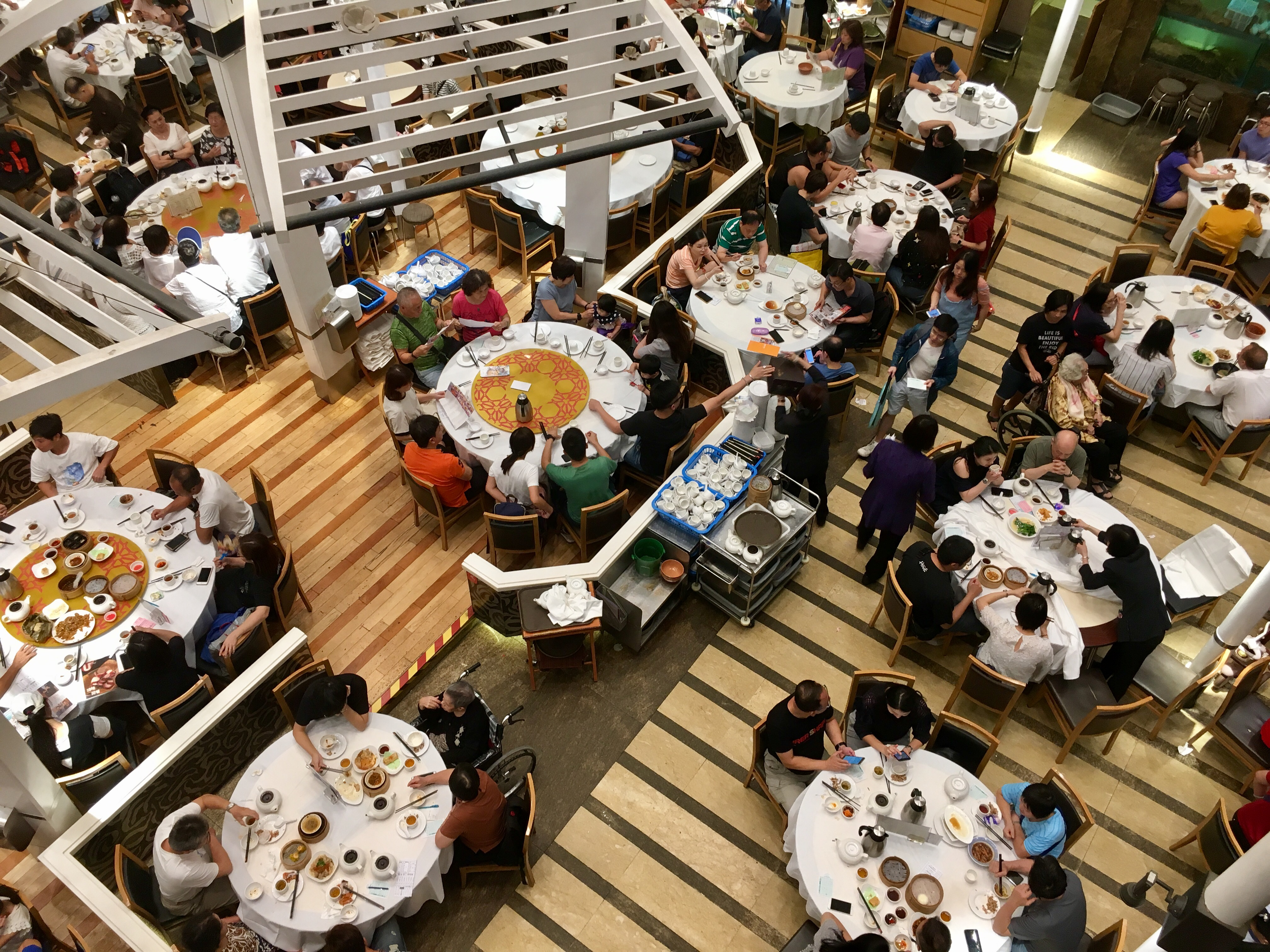
Overhead view of yum cha at Dim Sum City in Hong Kong

== Etymology ==
Yum cha in the Cantonese language, both literary and vernacular, literally means "drink tea". "飲" means "to drink", and "茶" means "tea". The term is also used interchangeably with tan cha (嘆茶) in the Cantonese language, which colloquially translates to "enjoy tea".

In Cantonese, yum cha refers to having a meal with dim sum dishes. Dim sum is the English word based on the Cantonese pronunciation of 點心.

In colloquial Mandarin dialects and Standard Vernacular Chinese based on one form of colloquial Mandarin, this character (喝) is often used to mean 飲 for the verb "drink". In the Chinese language, 點心 refers to a variety of foods, including European-style cakes and pastries, and has no equivalent in English.

In the English language, dim sum refers to small-dish appetizers and desserts.

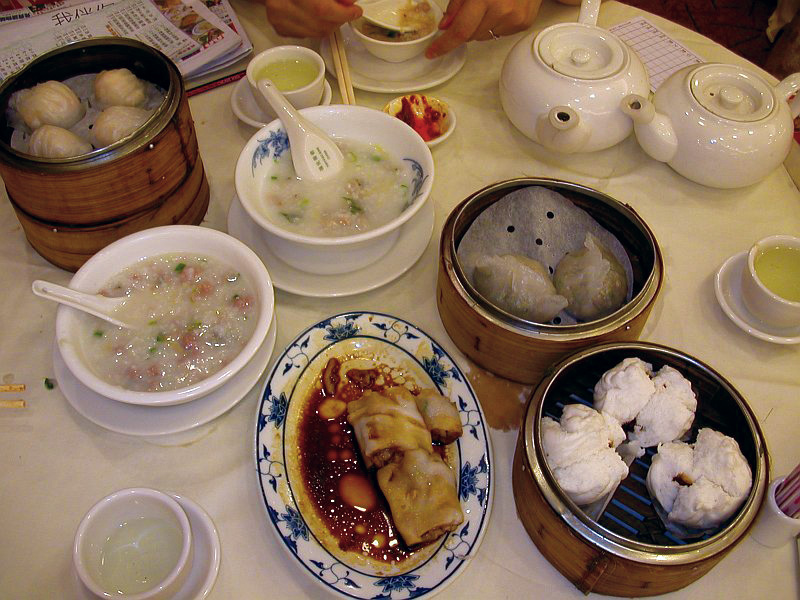
Dim sum dishes from top left in the clockwise direction: shrimp dumplings (蝦餃), congee (粥), jasmine tea (花茶), steamed dumplings (蒸水饺), barbecued pork-filled buns (叉燒包), and rice noodle rolls with soy sauce (腸粉).

== History ==
In the early 800s, the etiquette as well as manners of the tea ceremony were already established in the Pure Rules of Huaihai (百丈清規) by the Tang dynasty Zen master Baizhang Huaihai (百丈懷海) (749–814) as well as its transmission to Japan in 1103 in the Zenen Shingi(禅苑清規). It is evident that, along with tea, simple nuts and sweets were mainly used as accompaniments to tea, marking the prototype of modern tea-drinking customs which had already been completed. Furthermore, these practices spread as tea-drinking customs in Japan by the early 1100s.

The history of the tradition can also be traced back to the period of the Chinese Xianfeng Emperor, who first referred to establishments serving tea as yi li guan (一釐館, "1 cent house"). These offered a place for people to socialize, which became known as cha waa (茶話, "tea talk"). These tea houses grew to become their own type of restaurant and the visits became known as yum cha.

== Service ==
An introductory video on yum cha and dim sum

Traditionally, yum cha is practiced in the morning or early afternoon, hence the terms zou cha (早茶, "morning tea") or xia wu cha (下午茶, "afternoon tea") when appropriate. The former is also known as yum zou cha (飲早茶, "drinking morning tea"). In some parts of Guangdong province, restaurants offer dim sum during dinner hours and even late at night. This is known as yum je cha (飲夜茶, "drinking night tea"), though most venues still generally reserve the serving of dim sum for breakfast and lunch periods. The combination of morning tea, afternoon tea, evening tea, lunch and dinner is known as sam cha leung fan (三茶兩飯, "three tea, two meal").

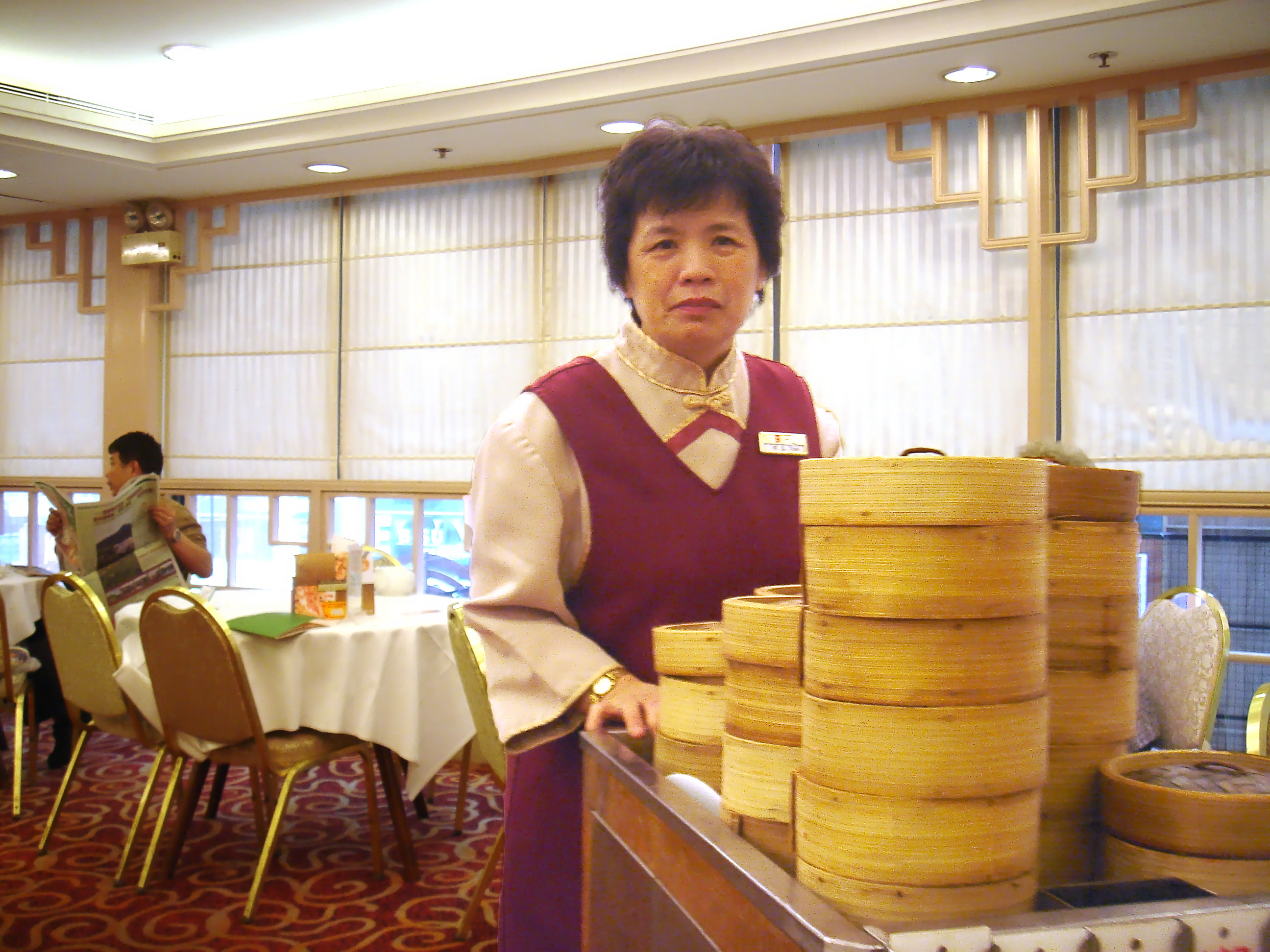
A server pushing a dim sum cart at a yum cha restaurant in Hong Kong

The traditional methods of serving dim sum include using trays strung around servers' necks or using push carts. The teoi ce (推車, "push-cart") method of serving dim sum, dates back to the early 1960s and includes dim sum items cooked in advance, placed into steamer baskets, and brought out on push carts into the dining area. Employees call out the items they are serving, customers notify the server about the items they would like to order, and the server places the desired items on the table. The general yum cha atmosphere is a loud, festive one due to the servers calling out the dishes and the groups of diners having conversations.

Many dim sum restaurants now use a paper-based à la carte ordering system. This method provides fresh, cooked-to-order dim sum while managing the real estate and resource constraints involved with push cart service.

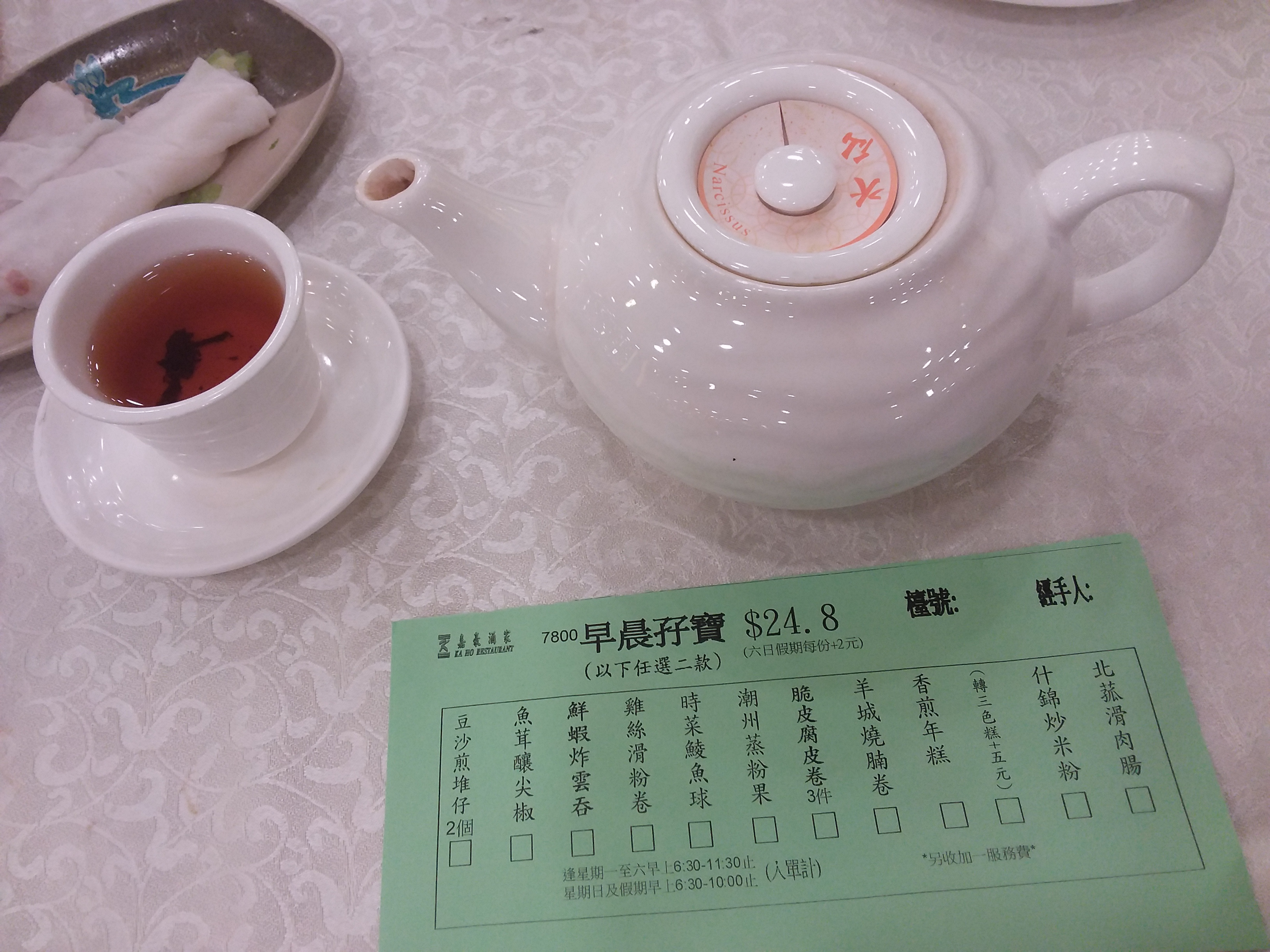
Tea cup, tea pot, and bill card

The cost of a meal was traditionally calculated by the number, size and type of dishes left on the patron's table at the end. In modern yum cha restaurants, servers mark orders by stamping a card or marking a bill card on the table. Servers in some restaurants use distinctive stamps to track sales statistics for each server.

== Customs and etiquette ==
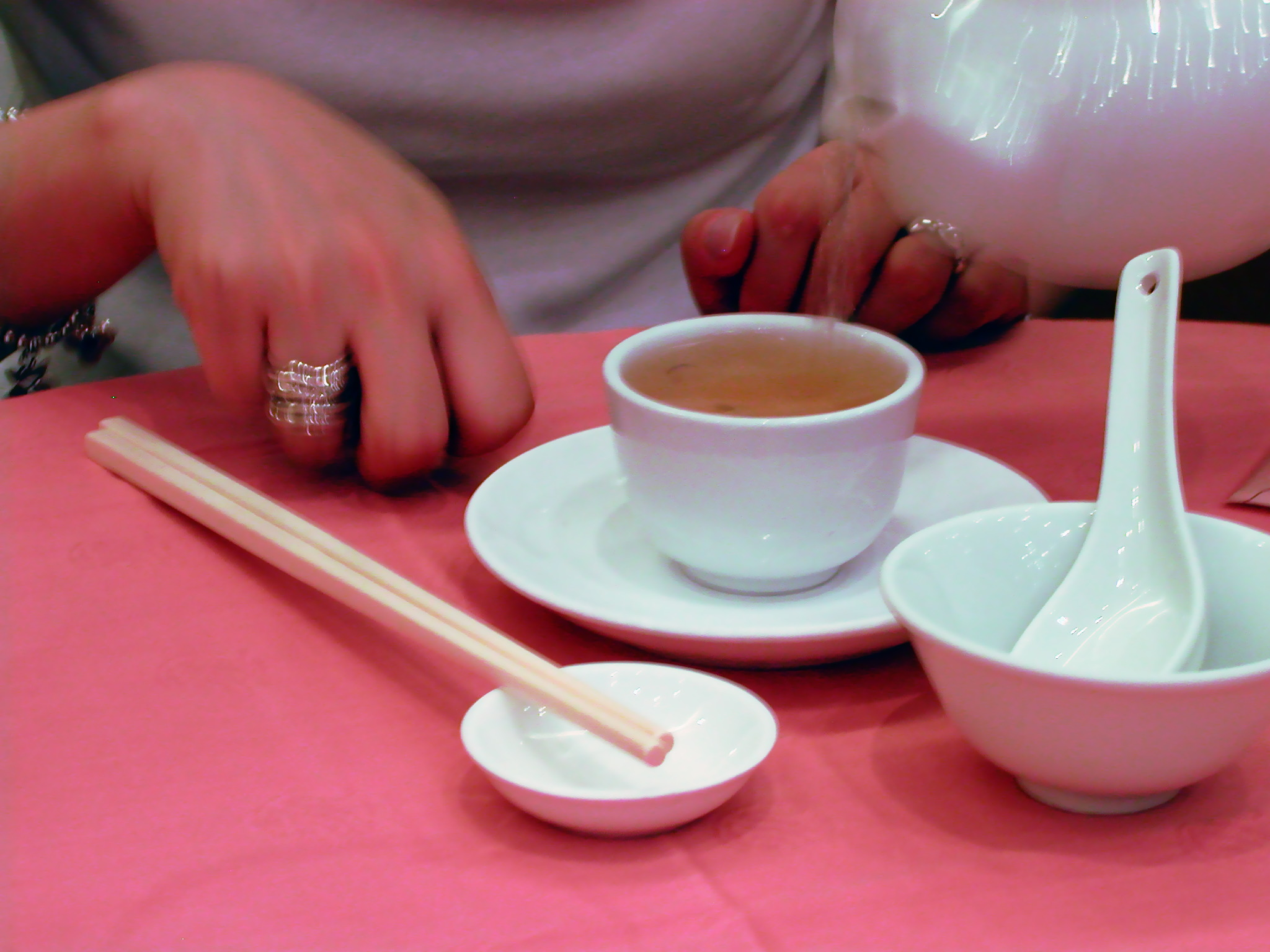
A tea-drinker tapping the table with her fingers to show gratitude to the member of the party who has filled her cup

The customs associated with the tea served at yum cha include:

- Selecting the type of tea to be served immediately after being seated by the server.
- Pouring tea for others before filling one's own tea cup, especially for the young ones serving tea to the elderly first, as a sign of politeness.
- Filling tea cups to about 80% because of the Cantonese proverb 「茶滿欺客，酒滿敬人」, which is translated literally as "it is fraud for the guest if the tea cup is full, but it is a sign of respect when it is alcohol."
- Tapping the table with two (occasionally one) fingers of the same hand in a gesture known as 'finger kowtow' that is a gesture of gratitude after receiving tea. This gesture can be traced to the Qianlong Emperor of the Qing dynasty, who used to travel incognito. While visiting the Jiangnan region, he once went into a teahouse with his companions. In order to maintain his anonymity, he took his turn at pouring tea. His companions wanted to bow to show their gratitude, but to do so would have revealed the identity of the emperor. Finally, one of them tapped three fingers on the table (one finger representing their bowed head and the other two representing their prostrate arms).
- Flipping open the lid (of hinged metal tea pots) or offset the tea pot cover (on ceramic tea pots) to signal an empty tea pot. Servers will then refill the pot.
- Following a traditional practice of washing the utensils with the first round of tea, tea is best served in hot cup to restore the temperature. A basin is available for disposing of the rinse tea. The taste of the first round of tea is considered not the finest yet, and will be richer afterwards.

For the diners, some typical customs include:

- Selecting the tables closest to the kitchen because the dim sum carts exit from there and the diners closest to the kitchen have first choice of the fresh dishes.
- Ordering dessert dishes on the dim sum carts at any time since there is not a set sequence for the meal.
- Feeling comfortable with declining dishes being offered by servers pushing the dim sum carts, regardless of the reasons (dietary, food preference, budgetary, or other reasons).

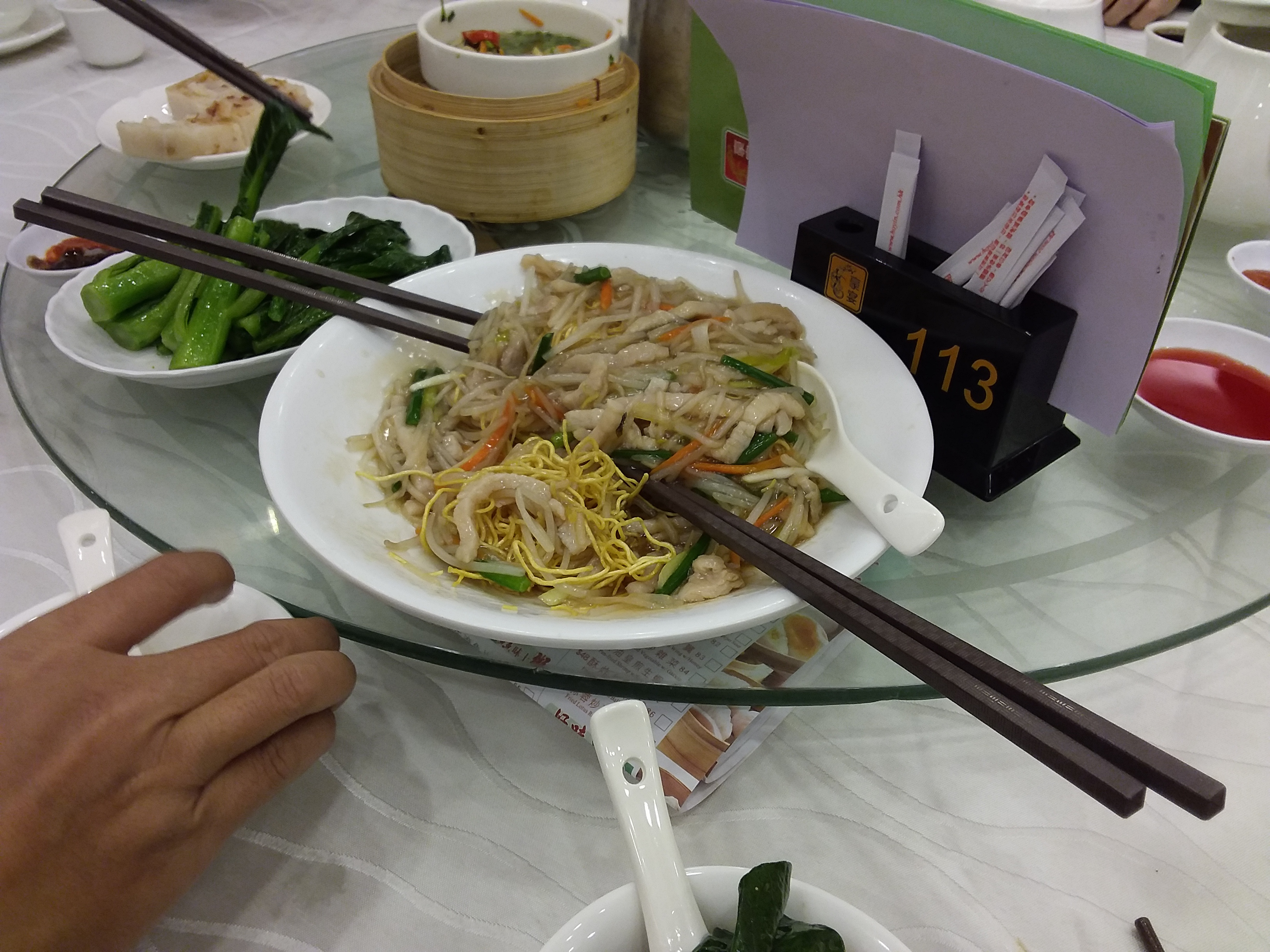
Lazy susan at yum cha lunch in Hong Kong with dim sum and lunch dishes

While eating, some of the manners include:

- Spinning the lazy susan such that the oldest person at the table has the opportunity to have the first serving when the meal starts or when an additional dish is served, to show respect. The lazy susan should not be spun when someone is taking food from a dish.
- Refraining from standing chopsticks straight up vertically, such as in rice or buns, due to the resemblance of incense offerings for the deceased.
- Offering dining companions the final serving when there is one last piece or final serving remaining on a dish.
- Insisting on paying the bill as it is common to treat one another to meals.
- In the case when there is no lazy Susan, only pick up the food which is in front of you.

A video showing yum cha at Lin Heung Teahouse

== Status and future ==
Yum cha continues in both traditional and modern forms, including restaurants serving both traditional and modern fusion dim sum. Modern dim sum can include dishes like abalone siu mai and barbecued wagyu beef bun. Dim sum chefs for yum cha continue to be trained at leading culinary institutes. One restaurant in Hong Kong creates social media-friendly dishes by preparing dumplings and buns shaped to resemble animals. Whether traditional or modern-day, yum cha is to be shared with friends and loved ones.

== See also ==
- Dim sum
- Table sharing
- Lin Heung Tea House
- Hong Kong cuisine
- Tea (meal)
