= Eight treasure duck =

Dish in Chinese cuisine

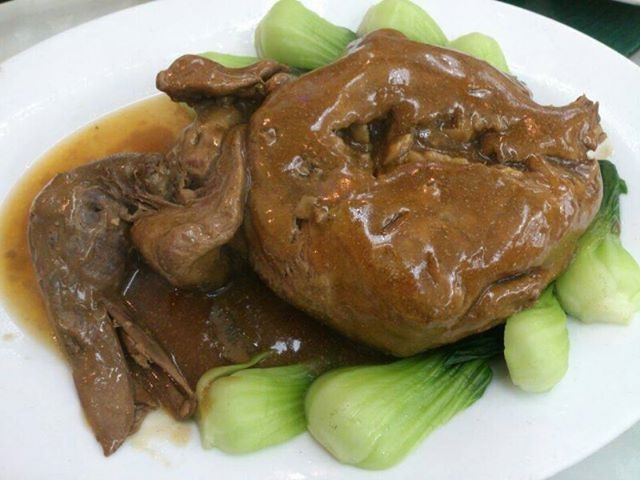
- Eight treasure duck served at Lin Heung Tea House
- Alternative names: Eight treasures duck
- Associated cuisine: Chinese
- Main ingredients: Duck
- Variations: Shanghai, Cantonese

Eight treasure duck
- Traditional Chinese: 八寶鴨
- Simplified Chinese: 八宝鸭
Transcriptions
Standard Mandarin
- Hanyu Pinyin: bābǎoyā
- Bopomofo: ㄅㄚ ㄅㄠˇ ㄧㄚ
- Wade–Giles: pa^{1}-pao^{3}-ya^{1}
- IPA: [pá.pàʊ.já]
Wu
- Romanization: paq^{7}-pau^{5}-aq^{7}
Yue: Cantonese
- Yale Romanization: baatbóuaap
- Jyutping: baat3 bou2 aap3
- IPA: [pat̚˧.pɔw˧˥.ap̚˧]

Eight treasure duck (Chinese: 八寶鴨; pinyin: bābǎoyā; Jyutping: baat3 bou2 aap3'; Shanghainese: paq^{7}-pau^{5}-aq^{7}, lit. 'eight treasure duck'), also known as eight treasures duck, is a duck dish in Shanghai and Cantonese cuisine. Its name derives from the fact that it is stuffed with eight other ingredients, including rice, mushrooms and shrimp.

== Cantonese version ==
The Cantonese version features a duck stuffed with eight stir-fried ingredients, including glutinous rice, diced mushrooms, water chestnuts, lotus seeds, Chinese sausage, dried shrimp, bamboo shoots, jujubes, salted egg yolk, Jinhua ham, red beans, barley, dried lily, and peanuts. Before the duck is stuffed, the duck is marinated overnight in dark soy sauce, spices, and Shaoxing wine. The duck skin is then tightened with hot oil ladled over the duck. After the duck is stuffed, it is cooked in a chicken and soy broth for over an hour, which produces tender and succulent meat. It became a famous banquet dish in Hong Kong in the 1930s. The dish is labor-intensive to prepare, and is typically ordered several days in advance in restaurants. The dish is traditionally served during Chinese New Year's Eve.

== See also ==
- Cantonese cuisine
- Shanghai cuisine
- Eight treasure rice
