= Eight treasure rice =

Chinese rice dish

Eight treasure rice 八寶飯
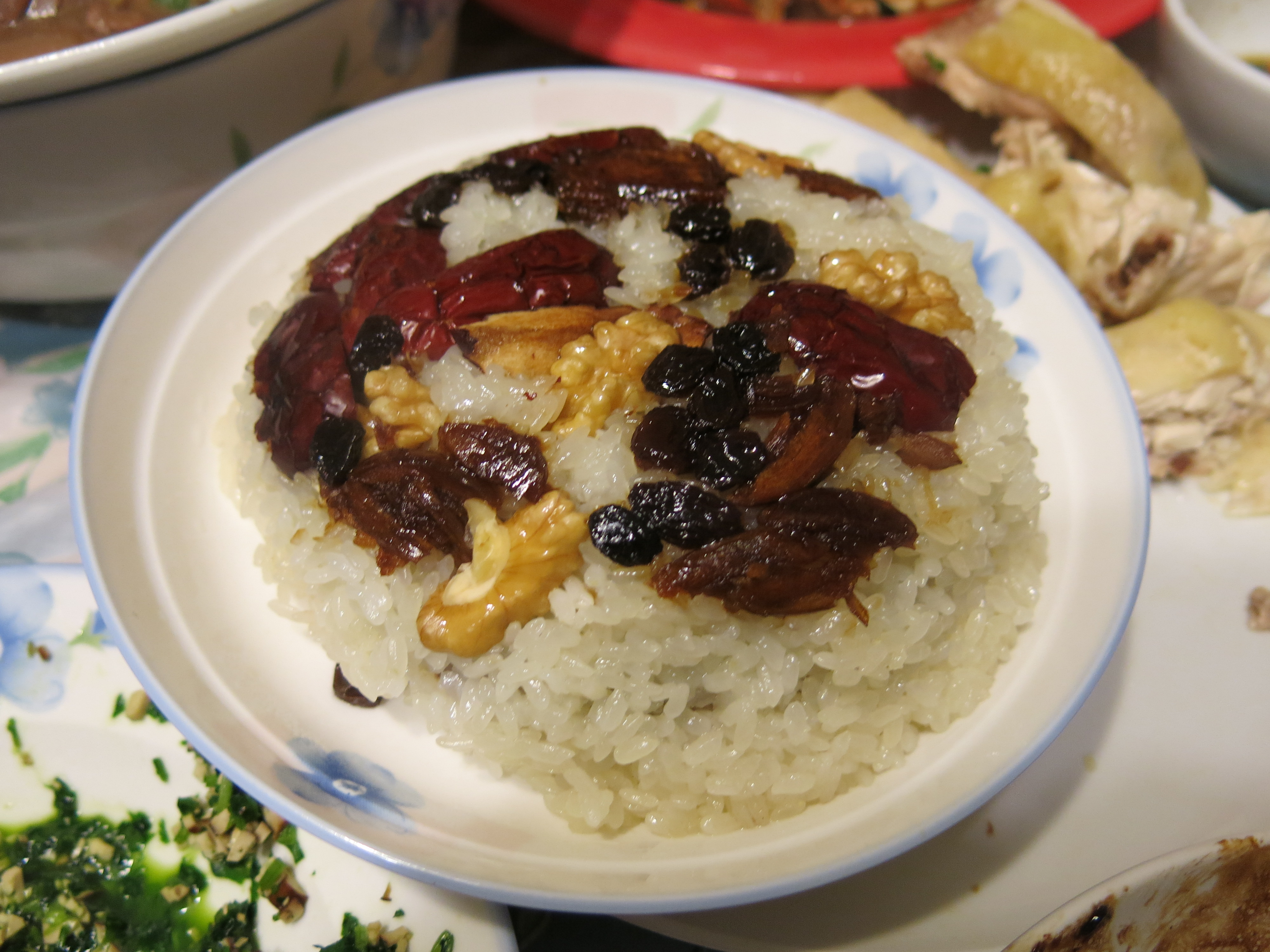
- Alternative names: see spellings
- Type: Dim sum
- Main ingredients: glutinous rice, sweet red bean paste
- Variations: typically sweet but may be savoury

Eight treasure rice (Chinese: 八寶飯; Simplified Chinese: 八宝米; Pinyin: bā bǎo fàn) is a Chinese dish made by steaming glutinous rice with various ingredients (traditionally eight of them). It is often eaten on celebratory occasions, in particular during Chinese New Year.

== Significance of name ==
The name comes from its traditional use of eight ingredients as topping. The number of ingredients are thought to confer the dish with fortuitous meaning due to the similarity between the Mandarin word for eight (Traditional Chinese :八, Simplified Chinese :八, Pinyin: bā) and the Mandarin word for prosperity (Traditional Chinese :發, Simplified Chinese :发, Pinyin: fā).

== Variations ==
=== Sweet variations ===
Typically glutinous rice is cooked with sugar and then mixed with a fat to add richness. A bowl or mold is lined with the eight treasures and a layer of rice is pressed in. Sweet red bean paste is added to the center before another layer of rice is pressed on top to seal it. The dish is then steamed. It is then inverted and de-molded to showcase the design.

Ingredients are frequently carefully selected either for their symbolic value or for their traditional medicinal and therapeutic associations in Chinese medicine. Common dried or candied fruit include, but are not limited to: jujubes (also known as red or Chinese dates), raisins, apricots, goji berries (wolfberries), longans (longans), plums, winter melon. Common nuts include: lotus seeds, pumpkin seeds, walnuts, melon seeds, Job's tears (coix seeds; adlay seed). Exact ingredients differ from family to family.

The dish is typically classified as sweet dim sum.

=== Savory variations ===
The Cantonese and Sichuan versions of Eight treasure rice may be savory and contain grilled meat, bacon, sausage, and/or peanuts. Eight treasure rice, made with minced pork, ham, shiitake mushrooms, and bamboo shoots, can also be stuffed into the stomach of a gutted duck or chicken and stewed in sake or soy sauce to make a dish called eight treasure duck or chicken.

== History ==
Various other stories exist as to the origin of this dish, including that it was created in honor of eight officials who helped King Wu of Zhou overthrow the previous ruler and found the Zhou dynasty in 1046.

Eight treasure rice was included as one of the dishes provided on Shenzhou 5, China's first human crewed spaceflight launched on 2003.

== Spellings ==
The name is rendered in multiple accepted forms, varying in capitalization, the use of the numeral “8” or the word “eight,” the singular or plural form of “treasure,” and the inclusion or omission of a hyphen. Most sources refer to it as rice but some refer to it as a rice pudding or sticky rice. Some refer to it by its pinyin name of Ba Bao Fan.

== See also ==
- Babaocai
- Eight treasure duck
- Laba Congee
