= Youth Daily =

Chinese Communist Party newspaper based in Shanghai, China

- Native name: 青年报
- Type: Daily
- Format: Broadsheet
- Owner: Shanghai Committee of the China Youth League
- Publisher: Youth Daily Press (青年报社)
- Founded: June 10, 1949
- Political alignment: Chinese Communist Party
- Language: Chinese
- Headquarters: Jing'an District, Shanghai, China
- Website: www.why.com.cn

The Youth Daily (simplified Chinese: 青年报; traditional Chinese: 青年報; pinyin: Qīngnián Bào) is a daily newspaper published in Shanghai, and the official newspaper of the Communist Youth League of China's Shanghai Committee. It is the first newspaper aimed to youth in P.R. China, and its establishment was approved by Deng Xiaoping.

It was affiliated with the Jiefang Daily from September 16, 1949, to February 14, 1952. It was forced to stop publishing in the Cultural Revolution in December 1966, and was restarted on June 10, 1979. On January 1, 1995, it became a daily.

Nowadays, Life Weekly (Chinese: 生活周刊, est. 1985), Touch Youth (Chinese: 青年社交) and Students' Post (Chinese: 学生导报) are three main sub-publications of Youth Daily.
