= Lin Heung Tea House =

Coordinates: 22.284294°N 114.153446°E

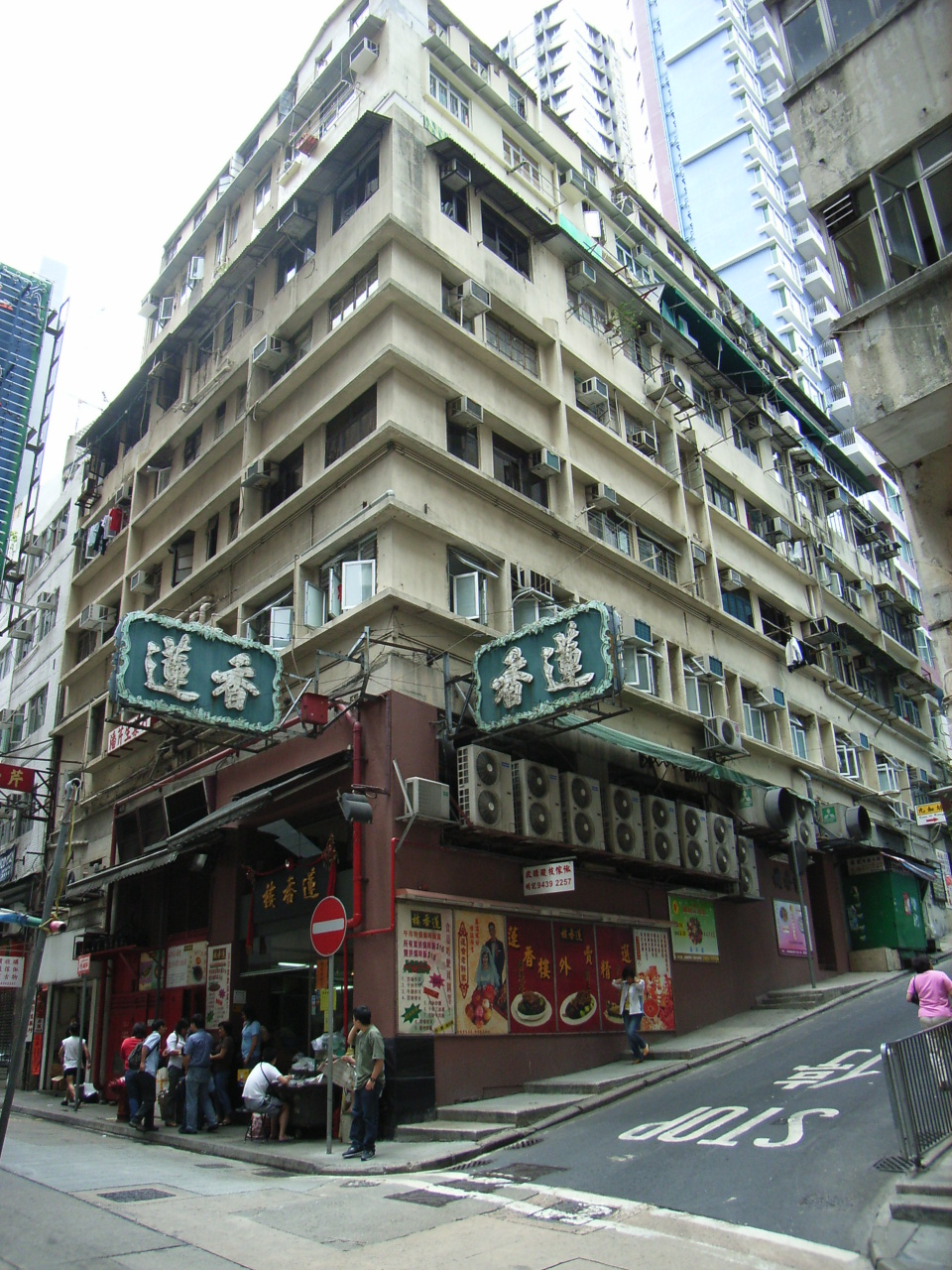
- Lin Heung Tea House at the corner of Wellington Street and Aberdeen Street.
- Interactive map of Lin Heung Tea House

Restaurant information
- Established: 1889
- Location: Hong Kong
- Website: linheung.com.hk

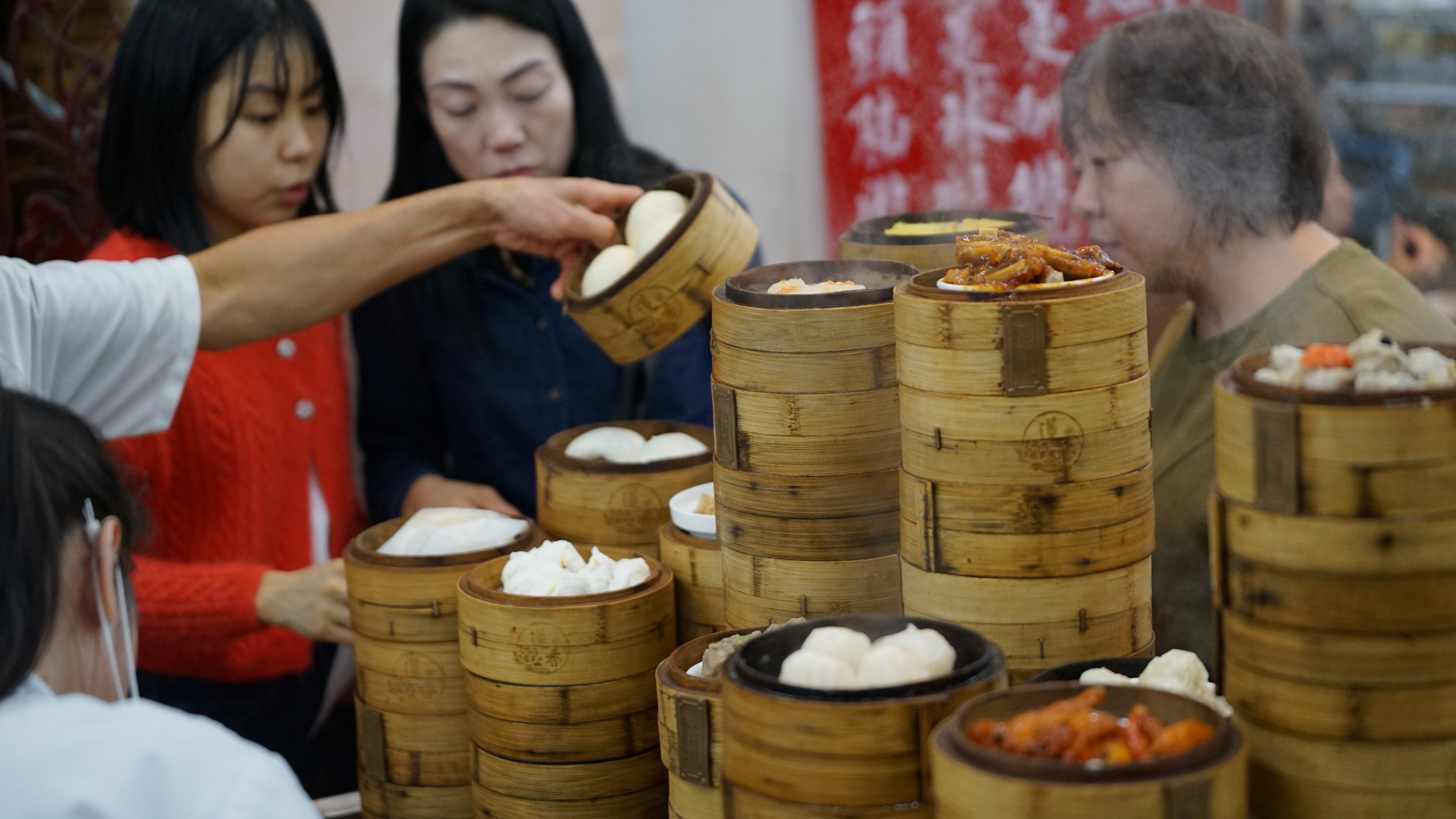

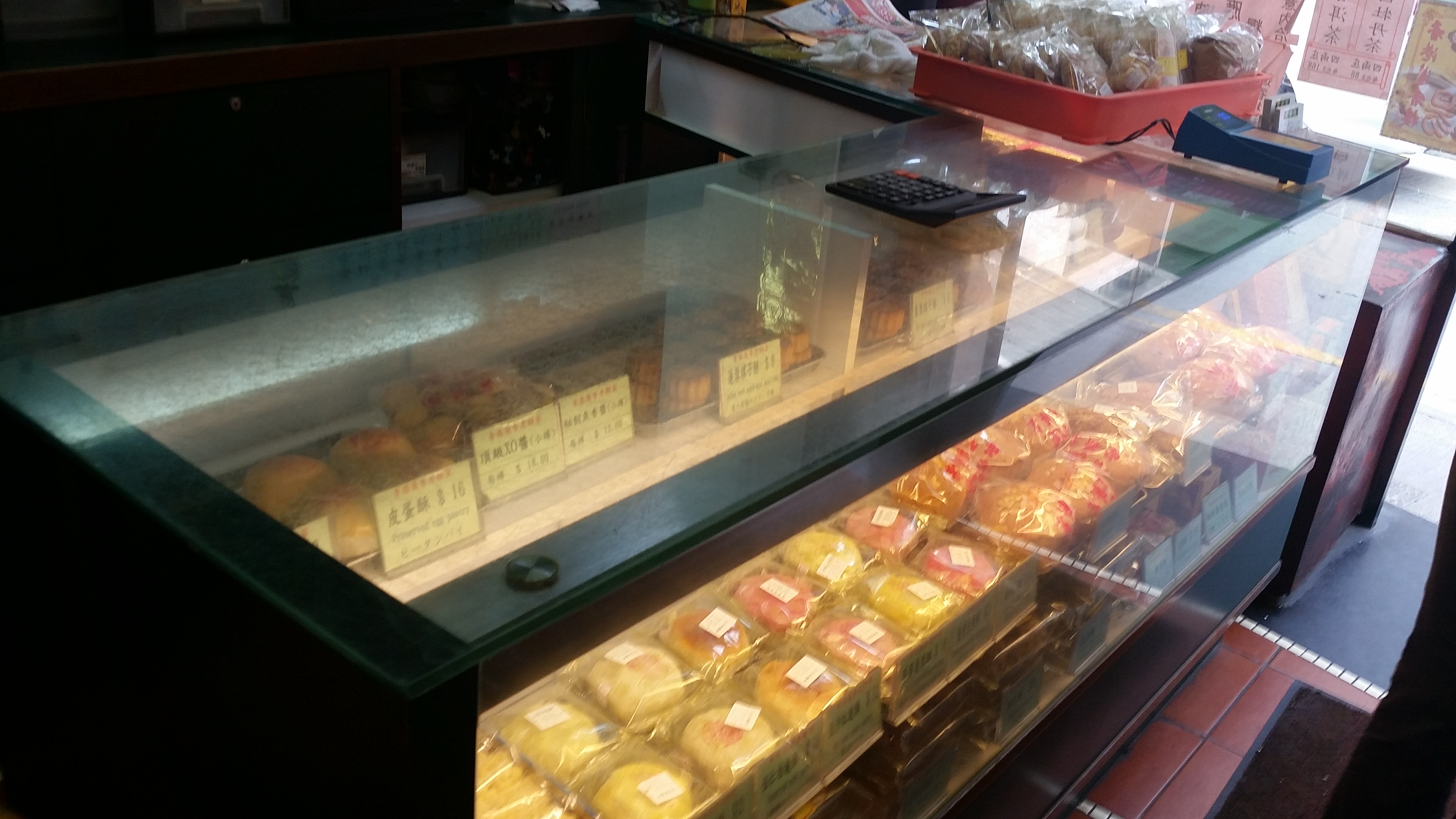
Lin Heung Bakery

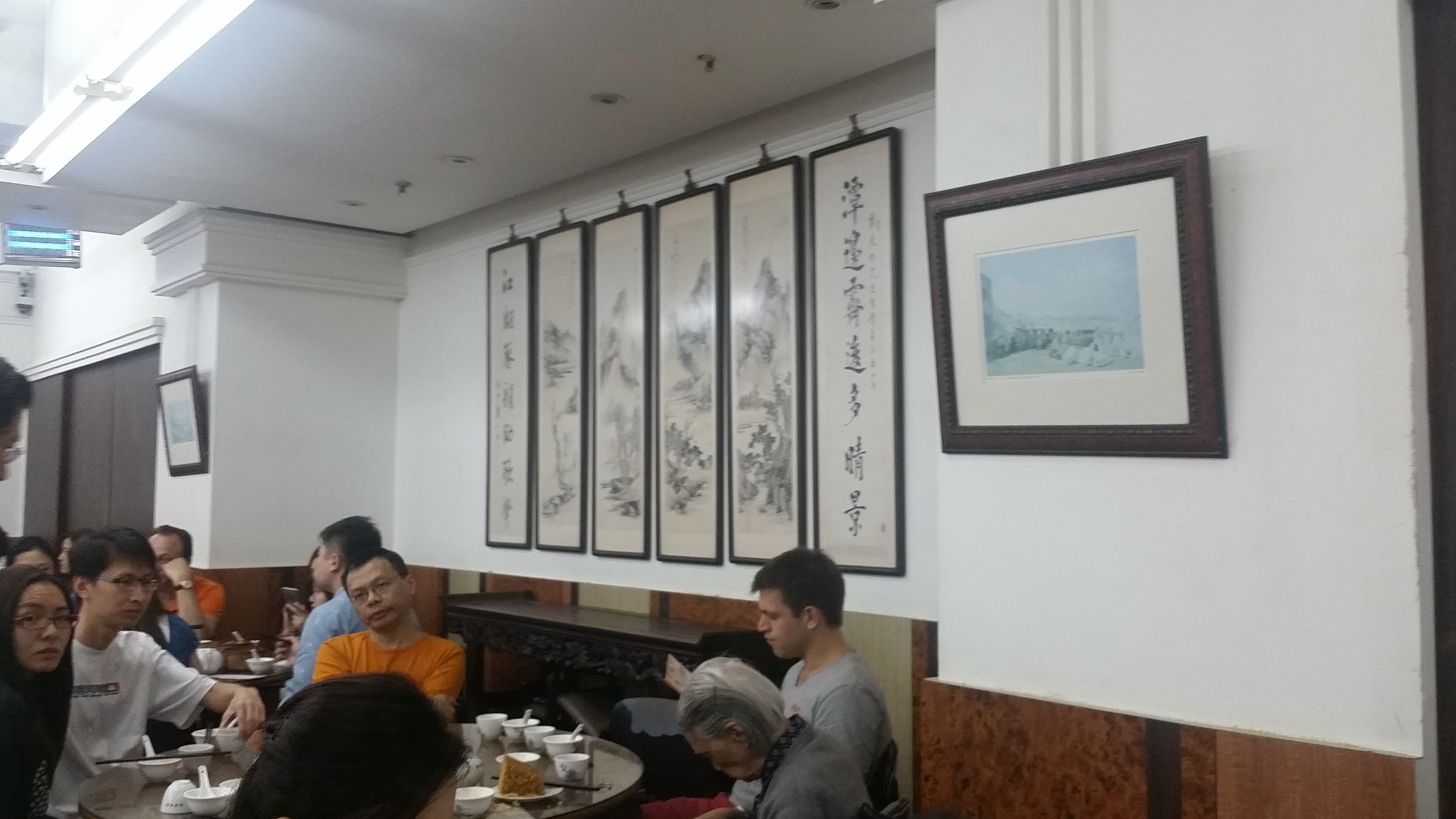
Traditional Chinese calligraphy

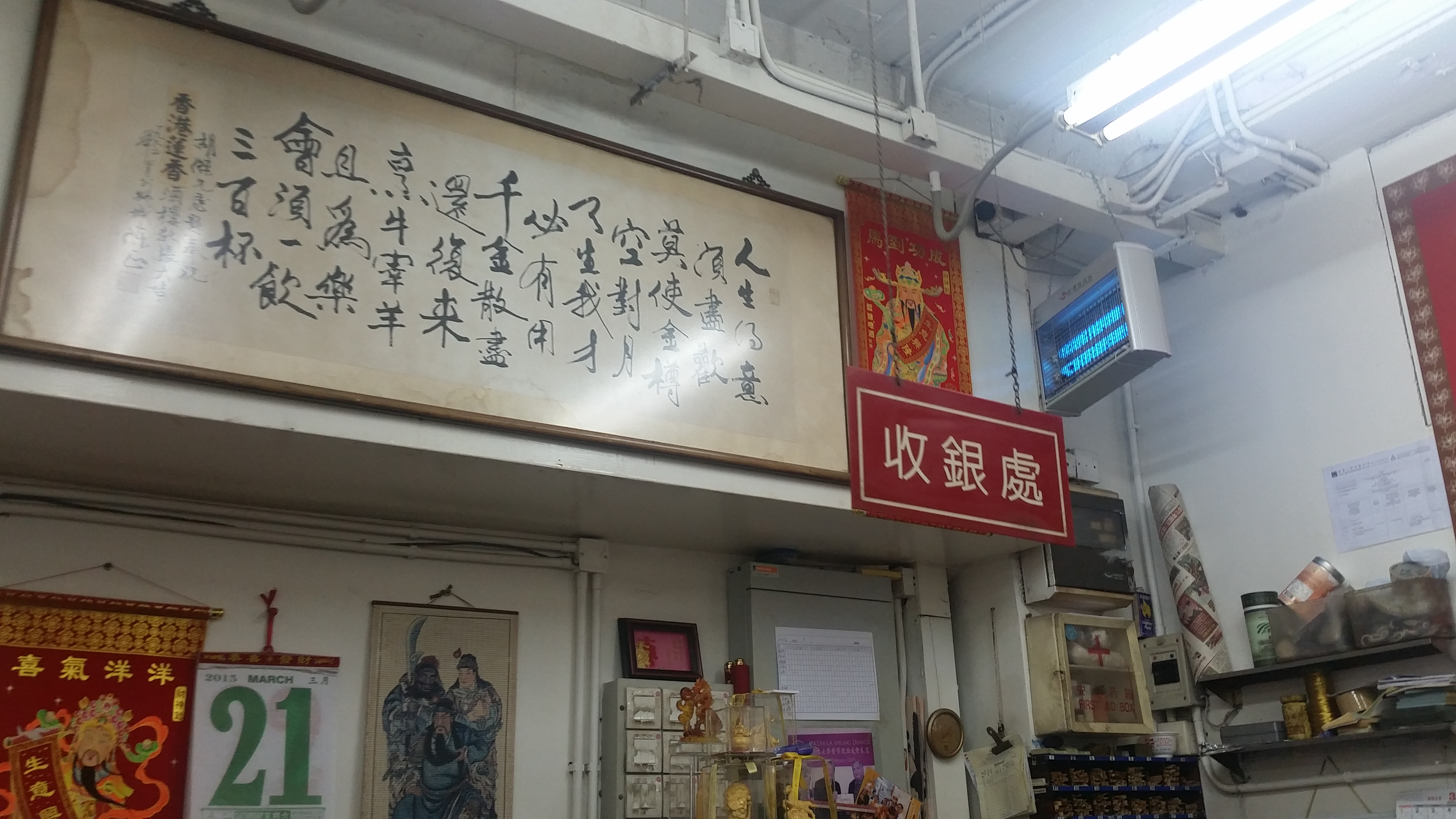
Traditional Chinese calligraphy

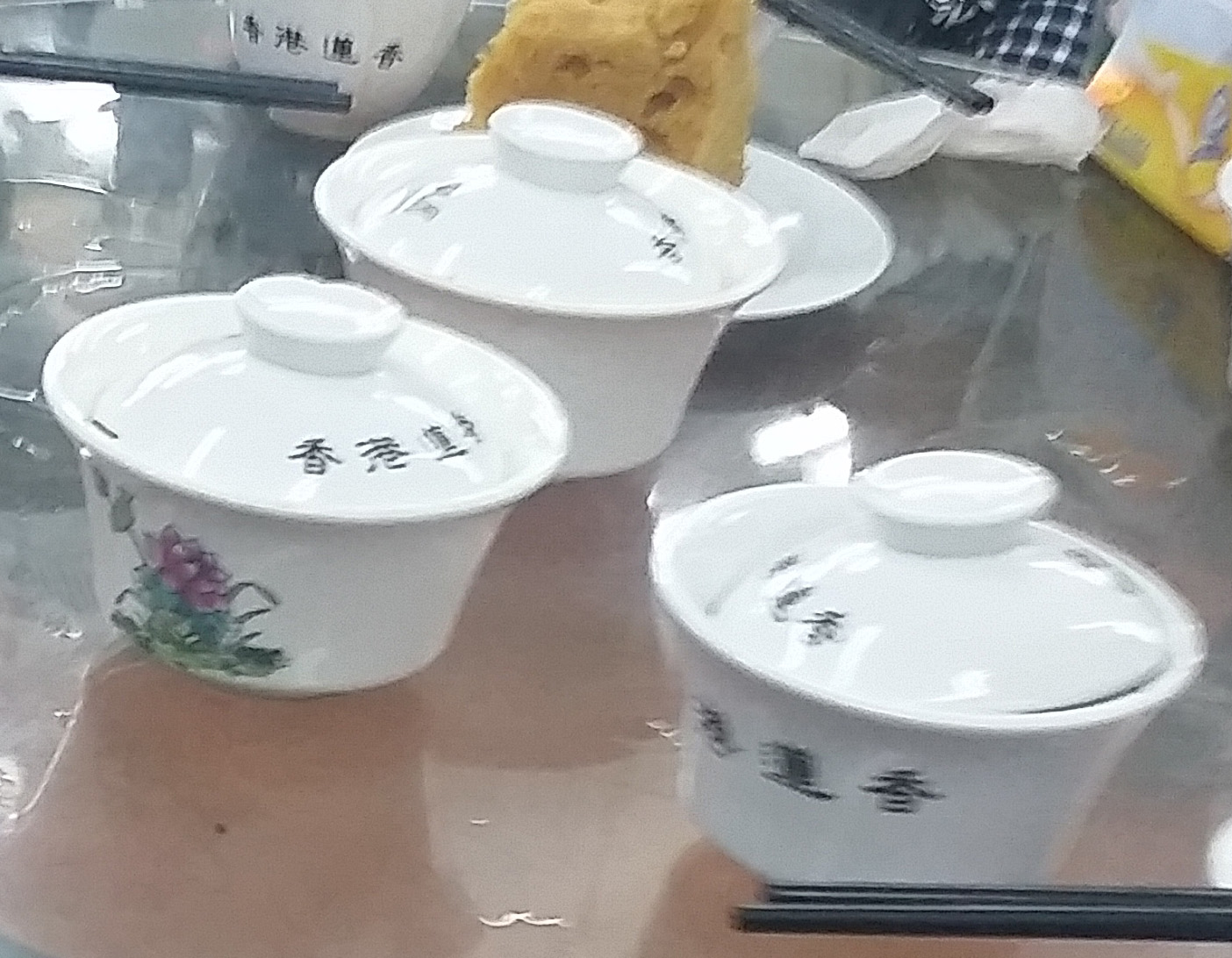
Tea cups

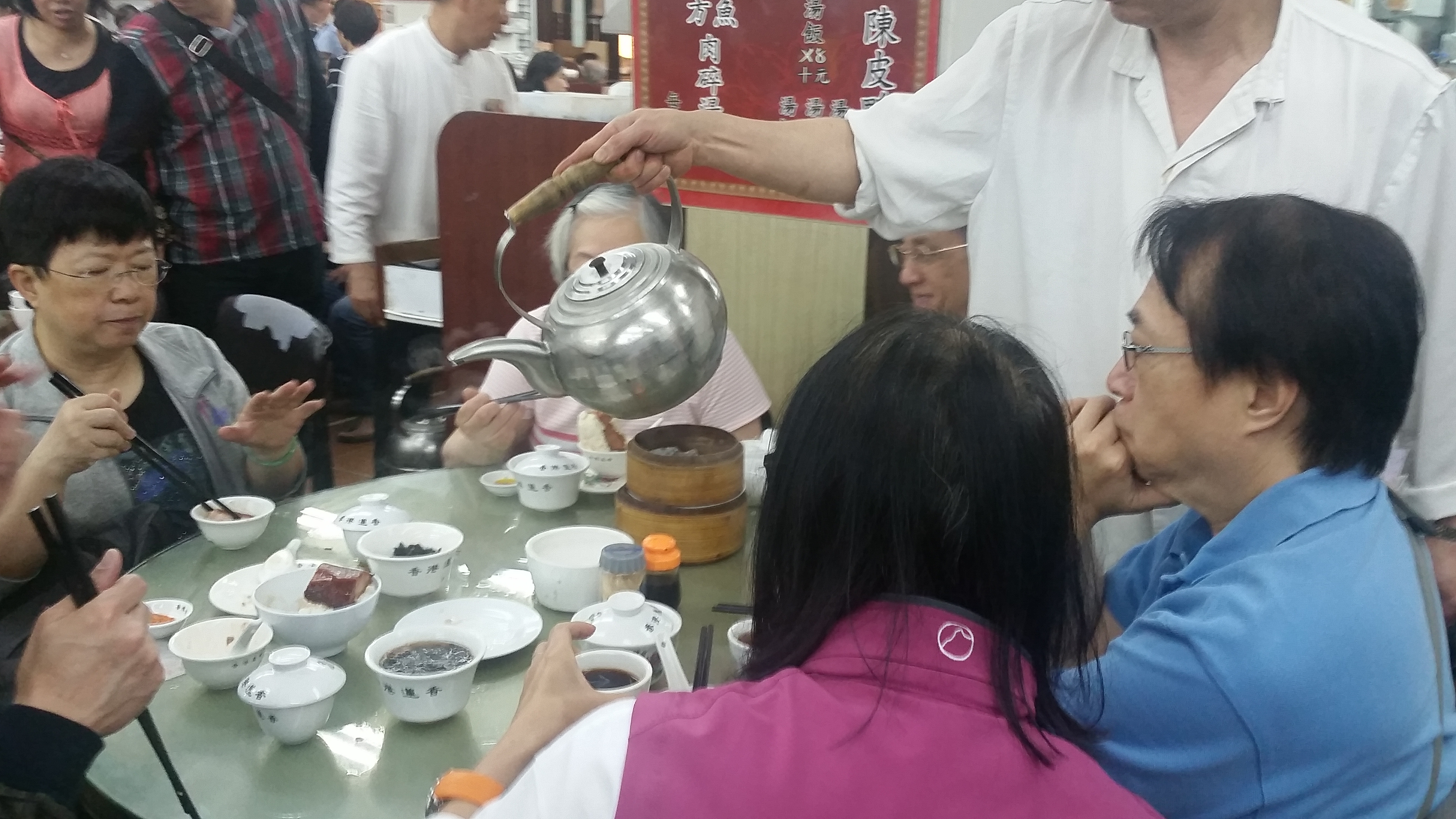
Traditional water kettle

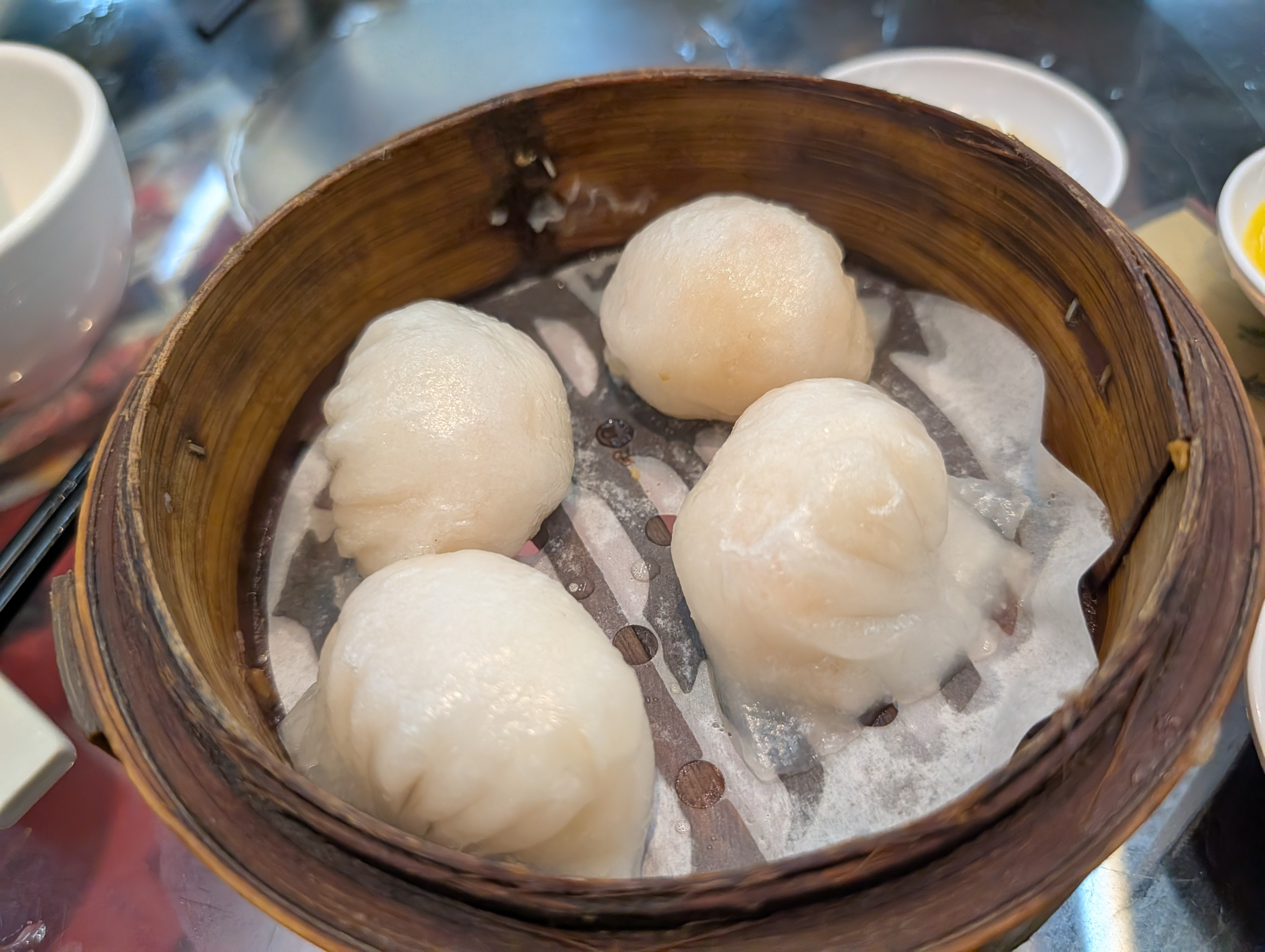

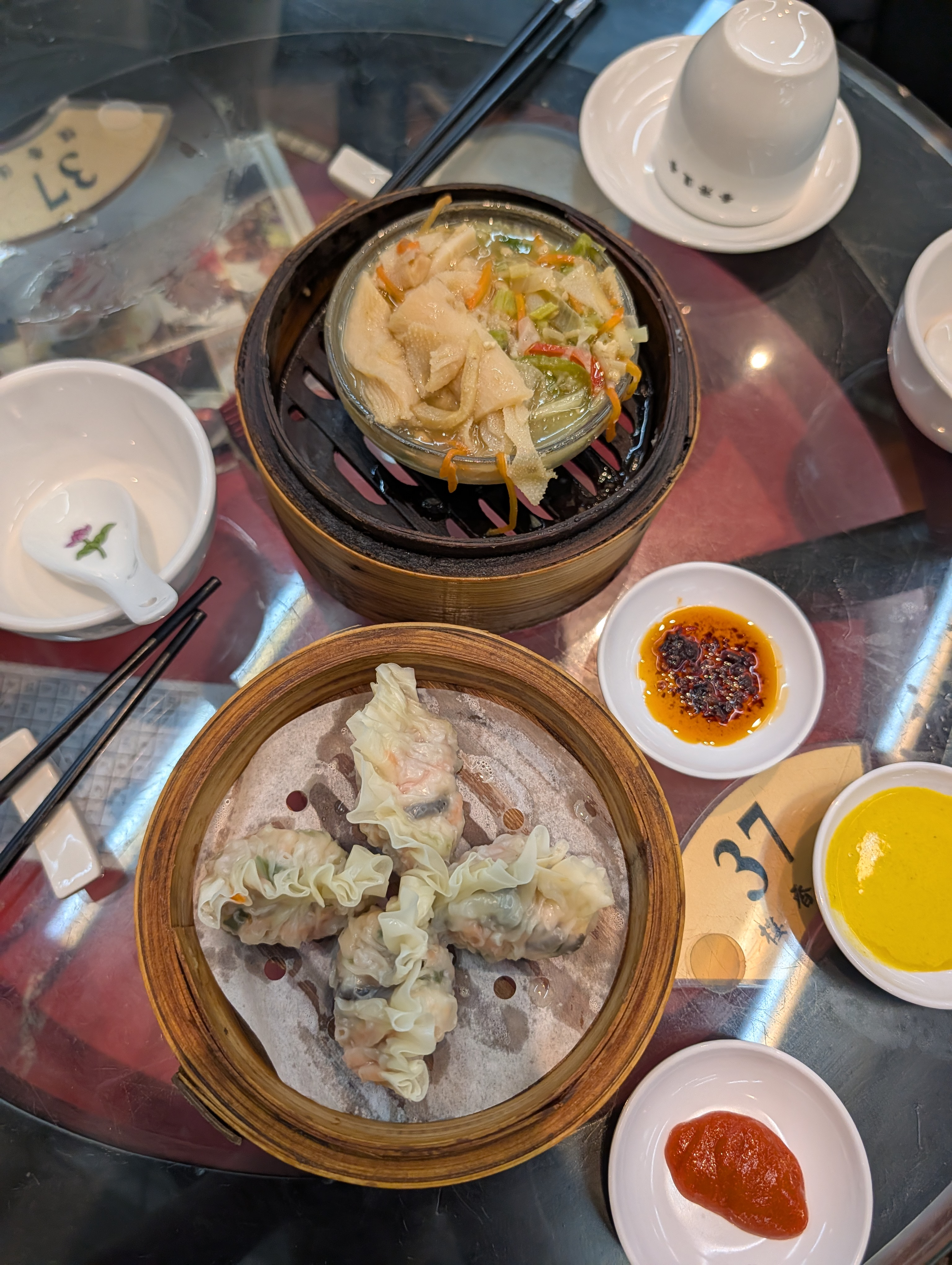

Lin Heung Tea House (Chinese: 蓮香樓; lit. 'Fragrant lotus') is a two-storey Chinese restaurant located in the Tsang Chiu Ho Building (曾昭灝大廈) at 160–164 Wellington Street, at the corner of Aberdeen Street, in Central, Hong Kong. The 100-year-old institution closed its doors on 9 August 2022 and reopened in its original location in April 2024.

== History ==
Lin Heung Tea House first opened in 1889 as a traditional tea house in Guangzhou. In 1926, two branches were opened in Hong Kong: one in Mong Kok, Kowloon and another in Central, Hong Kong Island. In 1980, Lin Heung Tea House moved to the current location and has been located there ever since. Lin Heung Tea House is famous for its authentic and traditional Chinese dim sum, attracting international newspapers coverage including features from CNN and TIME magazine.

Lin Heung Tea House has been featured in several films, including The Longest Summer (1998) and In the Mood for Love (2000).

On August 8, 2022, Lin Heung Tea House announced its closure via its Facebook page, reported by local media. Lin Heung Tea House allegedly owed employees four months' wage. In April 2024, it reopened in its original location, under new ownership.

In January 2026, Lin Heung announced that they will be closing their Central location in April and reopening in the Tung Ning Building on Des Voeux Road.

== Naming ==
Lin Heung (lit. "fragrant lotus") Tea House is named after the lotus seed paste, an essential ingredient found in steamed lotus-seed-paste bun, mooncake and the double-lotus pie. The lotuses used in Lin Heung House are called xiang-lians (Chinese: 香蓮), and they are imported from Hunan, China. The brown red xiang-lians are said to give a smooth flavour. After a Hanlin Academy member called Chan Yu Yue (Chinese: 陳如岳) visited the Tea House, he really appreciated their lotus paste. As a result, he took the Chinese word of lotus into the Tea House's name.

== Interior design ==
Lin Heung Tea House occupies two floors in a tenement building. While on the ground floor is the Lin Heung Bakery, on the first floor is a Chinese restaurant that serves traditional Chinese dim sum. Traditional Chinese calligraphy and landscape paintings are framed and pinned to the walls.

In 2024, the restaurant was in new ownership. They changed the bakery into a tea shop (LIN HEUNG TEA)

== Services ==
It has 50 tables and can serve up to 300 patrons. Since there is no host to serve diners in the restaurant, they are required to stand around the tables and get seats for themselves. Waiters will serve diners with cups, a basin for rinsing cutlery and offer them a tally card when they successfully get a seat. Moreover, due to the popularity of the restaurant, diners are expected to share a table.

== Tea ==
Lin Heung Tea House provides a variety of Chinese tea, such as oolong tea, pu'er tea, jasmine tea and shoumei tea.

The server provides two teacups for each diner: the bigger one for tea making, and the smaller one for drinking. Patrons need to steep tea in the larger cup and pour it into the smaller one.

Water refilling service is provided when the customers open the lid of the larger teacup as an indication that they would like to have their cups refilled. The staff will soon bring along a huge traditional water kettle and pour the hot water.

== Traditional trolleys ==
The dim sum supply is limited and it is served on traditional trolleys. No pre-ordering service is provided. If diners want to get dim sum, they need to follow the trolleys with the tally card. The server will chop a stamp on it after passing the diners their chosen food.

== Featured food ==
Aside from the lotus-seed-paste bun, the Tea House offers over 30 kinds of dim sum, including har gow, shumai, cha siu bao. Besides the traditional dim sum where one find in most Chinese restaurants, there are numerous special dishes that can be found only in Lin Heung Tea House. For example, steamed chicken bun (雞球大包), shumai made with liver (豬膶燒賣), whole winter melon soup (冬瓜盅), pa wong duck (蓮香霸王鴨) and eight treasures duck (八寶鴨)

== Menu ==
-	Morning Tea	-
Steamed Chicken Bun (雞球大包)	Lotus Seed Paste Bun (蓮蓉包)	Steamed Chicken Wrapped with Bean Curd (腐皮卷)
Shumai Made with Tripe (牛肚燒賣)	Shumai Made with Liver (豬膶燒賣)	Steamed Pork Meatball with Quail's Egg (鵪鶉蛋燒賣)
Steamed Chinese Sausage Roll (燒腩卷)	Steamed Chinese Sponge Cake (馬拉糕)	Steamed Custard Buns (奶皇包)

-	Lunch / Dinner	-
Grilled Pork Ribs (京都焗肉排)	Pa Wong Duck (蓮香霸王鴨)	Stuffed Mud Carp (家鄉煎釀鯪魚)
Steamed Stuffed Duck (八寶鴨)	Whole Winter Melon Soup (冬瓜盅)	Steamed Goose Intestine in Egg Custard (鷄蛋焗魚腸)
