= Sino Satellite Communications =

Chinese company

- Type: Subsidiary
- Industry: Aerospace
- Founded: May 1994
- Headquarters: Beijing, China
- Area served: mainland China
- Products: Satellite communication
- Owner: Chinese Government (via China Satcom)
- Parent: China Satcom
- Website: sinosatcom.com

Sino Satellite Communications Co., Ltd.
- Simplified Chinese: 鑫诺卫星通信有限公司
Transcriptions

SinoSat
- Simplified Chinese: 鑫诺卫星
Transcriptions

Sino Satellite Communications Co., Ltd. known also as SinoSat is a Chinese company.

It provided satellite communications through a pair of communications satellites in geostationary orbit. Their two satellites were SinoSat 1 and SinoSat 3. A third satellite, SinoSat 2, failed shortly after launch.

== History ==
Sino Satellite Communications was formed in 1994. It was a subsidiary of China Aerospace Science and Technology Corporation (CASC). In 2007, a new joint venture (Chinese: 中国直播卫星有限公司; lit. 'China Direct Broadcast Satellite Co.', 'Ltd.') was formed with another state-owned company China Satellite Communications, which SinoSat 1 and other assets was injected to the joint venture as share capital. However, in 2009 China Satellite Communications was assigned as a subsidiary of CASC by the State-owned Assets Supervision and Administration Commission of the State Council (excluding some assets that were assigned to China Telecommunications Corporation). Since then, Sino Satellite Communications became a subsidiary of China Satellite Communications, with all the satellites were under the brand ChinaSat instead.

In 2016 Sino Satellite Communications sold a 15% stake of a company (Chinese: 北京宇信电子) to Shenglu Telecommunication.

== Satellites ==
=== SinoSat 1 ===
Sinosat-1 was built by Aérospatiale using a Spacebus 3000 satellite bus. It was launched by a Long March 3B carrier rocket from the Xichang Satellite Launch Centre at 09:20 GMT on 18 July 1998. It was placed into a geostationary orbit, and is currently operating in a slot at 110.5° East of the Greenwich Meridian. It was redesignated Chinasat 5B.

=== SinoSat 1C ===
SinoSat 1C was the brand name of Apstar 2R/Telstar 10 in China.

=== SinoSat 1D ===
SinoSat 1C was the brand name of Telstar 18 in China.

=== SinoSat 2 ===
Sinosat-2 was based on the DFH-4 bus. It was launched at 16:20 GMT on 28 October 2006, also using a Long March 3B. After launch, its solar panels and communications antenna failed to deploy, making the satellite unusable.

=== SinoSat 3 ===
Sinosat-3 is a DFH-3 satellite, which was launched at 16:08 GMT on 31 May 2007. A Long March 3A rocket was used to place it into geosynchronous transfer orbit, making the 100th flight of a Long March rocket. It operates in geostationary orbit at 125° East. It was redesignated ChinaSat 5C.

=== SinoSat 5 ===
Launched in 2011. Renamed to ChinaSat 10

=== SinoSat 6 ===
Launched in 2010 by a Long March 3B rocket. Renamed to ChinaSat 6A.

== Shareholders ==
According to the company website, Sino Satellite Communications was owned by several state-owned companies, namely China Aerospace Science and Technology Corporation (CASC), CITIC Group and China Financial Computerization Corporation (Chinese: 中国金融电子化公司). However, as of 31 December 2007, CASC owned 99.26% stake directly and indirectly.

== See also ==
- ChinaSat
- List of Long March launches
