= Chinasat =

Brand name of communications satellites

ChinaSat
- 中星; Zhōng Xīng

Program overview
- Country: People's Republic of China
- Organization: China Satellite Communications
- Purpose: Communications
- Status: Active

ChinaSat (Chinese: 中星; pinyin: Zhōngxīng) is the brand name of communications satellites operated by China Satellite Communications.

== History ==
In 2007, a joint venture China Direct Broadcast Satellite was formed to run the brand ChinaSat. It was a joint venture of state-owned companies China Satellite Communications, China Orient Telecommunications Satellite and Sino Satellite Communications. The latter was controlled by China Aerospace Science and Technology Corporation (CASC). However, China Satellite Communications was changed from a direct subsidiary of the State-owned Assets Supervision and Administration Commission of the State Council (SASAC) to a direct subsidiary of CASC in 2009, the joint venture was dissolved and Sino Satellite Communications became a subsidiary of China Satellite Communications.

The brand ChinaSat was previously operated by China Telecommunications Broadcast Satellite Corporation, which was owned by China's Ministry of Posts and Telecommunications. China Telecommunications Broadcast Satellite Corporation was merged with other state-owned companies to form China Satellite Communications Corporation circa 2000.

Satellites formerly operated by Sino Satellite Communications and China Orient Telecommunications Satellite were renamed with ChinaSat designations following the acquisition of China Satellite Communications by CASC. ChinaStar 1 became ChinaSat 5A, SinoSat 1 became ChinaSat 5B, and SinoSat 3 became ChinaSat 5C.

== Satellites ==
Satellite	Launch Date	Launch site	Launcher	Mass	Status	Note
ChinaSat 1 (DFH-2A 2)	07 March 1988	Xichang, LA-3	Long March 3		Retired	
ChinaSat 2 (DFH-2A 3)	22 December 1988	Xichang, LA-3	Long March 3		Retired	
ChinaSat 3 (DFH-2A 4)	04 February 1990	Xichang, LA-3	Long March 3		Retired	
ChinaSat 4 (DFH-2A 5)	28 December 1991	Xichang, LA-3	Long March 3		Partial Failure	
ChinaSat 1A (FH-2A)	18 September 2011	Xichang, LA-2	Long March 3B/E		Operational	
ChinaSat 1B (FH-2B)		Xichang	Long March 3B/E		Planned	
ChinaSat 1C (FH-2C)	09 December 2015	Xichang, LA-3	Long March 3B/E		Operational	
ChinaSat 1D (FH-2D)	26 November 2021	Xichang, LA-2	Long March 3B/E		Operational	
ChinaSat 1E (FH-2E)	13 September 2022	Wenchang, LC-2	Long March 7A		Operational	
ChinaSat 2A (ST-2A)	26 May 2012	Xichang, LA-2	Long March 3B/E		Operational	
ChinaSat 2B (ST-2B)		Xichang	Long March 3B/E		Planned	
ChinaSat 2C (ST-2C)	03 November 2015	Xichang, LA-3	Long March 3B/E		Operational	
ChinaSat 2D (ST-2D)	10 January 2019	Xichang, LA-2	Long March 3B/E		Operational	
ChinaSat 2E (ST-2E)	05 August 2021	Xichang, LA-2	Long March 3B/E		Operational	
ChinaSat 3A (FH-3A)	29 July 2024	Wenchang, LC-2	Long March 7A		Operational	
ChinaSat 3B (FH-3B)	20 May 2025	Wenchang, LC-2	Long March 7A		Operational	
ChinaSat 4A (ST-3A)	22 August 2024	Wenchang, LC-2	Long March 7A		Operational	
ChinaSat 4B (ST-3B)	10 August 2026	Wenchang, LC-2	Long March 7A		Failed	
ChinaSat 5 (Spacenet 1)	23 May 1984	Kourou, ELA-1	Ariane 1		Retired	
ChinaSat 5R (Spacenet 2)	10 November 1984	Kourou, ELA-1	Ariane 3		Retired	
ChinaSat 5A (ChinaStar-1/APStar-9A)	30 May 1998	Xichang, LA-2	Long March 3B		Operational	
ChinaSat 5B (Sinosat-1/PSN-5)	18 July 1998	Xichang, LA-2	Long March 3B		Operational	
ChinaSat 5C (Sinosat 3/Eutelsat 3A/Eutelsat 8 West D)	31 May 2007	Xichang, LA-3	Long March 3A		Operational	
ChinaSat 5D (APStar 1A)	03 July 1996	Xichang, LC-3	Long March 3		Retired	
ChinaSat 5E (APStar 1)	21 July 1994	Xichang, LC-3	Long March 3		Retired	
ChinaSat 6 (DFH-3 2)	11 May 1997	Xichang, LC-2	Long March 3A		Retired	
ChinaSat 6A (Sinosat-6)	04 September 2010	Xichang, LA-2	Long March 3B/E		Operational	
ChinaSat 6B	05 July 2007	Xichang, LA-2	Long March 3B		Operational	
ChinaSat 6C	09 March 2019	Xichang, LA-3	Long March 3B/E		Operational	
ChinaSat 6D	15 April 2022	Xichang, LA-2	Long March 3B/E		Operational	
ChinaSat 6E	09 November 2023	Xichang, LA-2	Long March 3B/E		Operational	
ChinaSat 7 (HGS-2)	18 August 1996	Xichang, LA-3	Long March 3		Partial Failure	
ChinaSat 9	09 June 2008	Xichang, LA-2	Long March 3B/E		Operational	
ChinaSat 9A	18 June 2017	Xichang, LA-2	Long March 3B/E		Failed	
ChinaSat 9B	09 September 2021	Xichang, LA-2	Long March 3B/E		Operational	
ChinaSat 9C	20 June 2025	Xichang, LA-2	Long March 3B/E		Operational	
ChinaSat 10	20 June 2011	Xichang, LA-2	Long March 3B/E		Operational	
ChinaSat 10R	22 February 2025	Xichang, LA-2	Long March 3B/E		Operational	
ChinaSat 11	01 May 2013	Xichang, LA-2	Long March 3B/E		Operational	
ChinaSat 12/APStar 7B (SupremeSat 1/ChinaSat 15A)	27 November 2012	Xichang, LA-2	Long March 3B/E		Operational	
ChinaSat 15/Belintersat 1	15 January 2016	Xichang, LA-3	Long March 3B/E		Operational	
ChinaSat 16/Shijian 13	12 April 2017	Xichang, LA-2	Long March 3B/E		Operational	
ChinaSat 18	12 August 2017	Xichang, LA-2	Long March 3B/E		Operational	
ChinaSat 19	05 November 2022	Xichang, LA-2	Long March 3B/E		Operational	
ChinaSat 20 (ST-1)	14 November 2003	Xichang, LA-2	Long March 3A		Operational	
ChinaSat 20A (ST-1B)	24 November 2010	Xichang, LA-2	Long March 3A		Operational	
ChinaSat 22 (FH-1A)	14 January 2000	Xichang, LA-2	Long March 3A		Operational	
ChinaSat 22A (FH-1B)	14 September 2006	Xichang, LA-2	Long March 3A		Operational	
ChinaSat 26	23 February 2023	Xichang, LA-2	Long March 3B/E		Operational	
ChinaSat 27	2027	Xichang, LA-2	Long March 3B/E		Planned	

=== ChinaSat 1A to 1E ===
The Zhongxing-1x (or ChinaSat-1x) series includes four spacecraft as of September 2022. Despite the ChinaSat designation the satellites are reportedly to be Fenghuo-2 military communications satellites manufactured by CAST and based on the DFH-4 satellite bus. They follow the first generation of Fenghuo satellites, namely ChinaSat 22 and ChinaSat 22A. The first three satellites have been launched from the Xichang Satellite Launch Center using Long March-3B/G2 rockets while the fourth one has been launched from the Wenchang Space Launch Site using a Long March 7A rocket, and in particular:

- ChinaSat 1A was launched on 18 September 2011 at 16:33 UTC
- ChinaSat 1C was launched on 9 December 2015 at 16:46 UTC
- ChinaSat 1D was launched on 26 November 2021 at 16:40 UTC
- ChinaSat 1E was launched on 13 September 2022 at 13:18 UTC

The shift to a different launcher for the fourth satellite capable of carrying a greater mass to the intended geosynchronous orbit could indicate the use of a bigger and heavier satellite bus, possibly an upgraded version of the previously used DFH-4 bus.

=== ChinaSat 2A ===
ChinaSat 2A was launched in 2012.

=== ChinaSat 2D ===
Zhongxing-2D (or ChinaSat-2D) was launched at 17:05 UTC on 10 January 2019 from the Xichang Satellite Launch Center using a Long March-3B/G3 from the LA-2 launch complex.

=== ChinaSat 2E ===
Zhongxing-2E (or ChinaSat-2E) was launched at 16:30 UTC on 5 August 2021 from the Xichang Satellite Launch Center using a Long March-3B/G3 from the LA-2 launch complex. The satellite is a military communication satellite and its real name is Shentong 2-05, with the ChinaSat denomination being a cover name.

=== ChinaSat 3A/3B ===
Zhongxing 3A (or ChinaSat 3A) is the first of a new series of ChinaSat satellites, successfully launched on 29 June 2024 from the Wenchang Space Launch Site on a Long March 7A launch vehicle. Manufactured by CAST and officially described as a generic GEO communications satellite, it is speculated that this new series is composed of military communications satellites of a kind similar to the ChinaSat 1x ones with a Fenghuo 3 designation. A second satellite, Zhongxing 3B (or ChinaSat 3B), was launched on 20 May 2025 from the Wenchang Space Launch Site on a Long March 7A launch vehicle.

=== ChinaSat 4A ===
Zhongxing 4A (or ChinaSat 4A) is the first of a new series of satellites believed to be new series of Shen Tong military communications satellites. It was launched on 22 August 2024 from the Wenchang Space Launch Site on a Long March 7A launch vehicle.

=== ChinaSat 4B ===
ChinaSat 4B launched on 10 August 2026 from the Wenchang Space Launch Site on a Long March 7A launch vehicle. Eighty-five seconds into the launch, the rocket exploded, destroying the satellite.

=== ChinaSat 5A ===
ChinaSat 5A was launched in 1998, formerly known as ChinaStar 1. It was leased to China Satellite Communications's subsidiary APT Satellite Holdings and renamed to Apstar 9A on 9 January 2014.

=== ChinaSat 5B ===
ChinaSat 5B was launched in 1998, formerly known as Sinosat 1. It was sold to Pasifik Satelit Nusantara in 2012.

=== ChinaSat 5C ===
ChinaSat 5C was launched in 2007, formerly known as SinoSat 3. It was leased to Eutelsat in 2011 (as Eutelsat 3A and then Eutelsat 8 West D).

=== ChinaSat 5D ===
ChinaSat 5D was launched in 1996, formerly known as Apstar 1A. It was placed in geosynchronous orbit at a longitude of 51.5° East circa 2009. It was acquired by China Satellite Communications from subsidiary APT Satellite Holdings.

=== ChinaSat 5E ===
ChinaSat 5E was launched in 1994, formerly known as Apstar 1. It was placed in geosynchronous orbit at a longitude of 142° East and moved to 163° East circa 2012. It was acquired by China Satellite Communications from subsidiary APT Satellite Holdings.

=== ChinaSat 6 to 6E ===
The Zhongxing 6 (Chinasat 6) family is composed of geostationary communication satellites providing commercial services for TV and radio networks and as of 2023 it counts six launched satellites.

The first of the group, ChinaSat 6 (ZX 6, DHF-3 2), is based as its predecessor (DHF-3 1) on the DHF-3 satellite bus. DHF-3 1 was launched on 29 November 1994 but didn't reach its intended orbit and was declared lost, while ChinaSat 6 was launched on 11 May 1997 and reached its intended orbit but experienced technical malfunctions that could reduce its operational life. Both launches took place in Xichang Satellite Launch Center using Long March 3A rockets.

ChinaSat 6A (ZX 6A) was launched in 2010. Formerly known as SinoSat 6, it's a communications satellite based on the DFH-4 satellite bus. It was launched on 4 September 2010 at 16:14 UTC from the Xichang Satellite Launch Center using a Long March 3B rocket, but after launch the satellite suffered problems in the helium pressurization system, which lead to a significant reduction of the operational life to only 11 years.

The ChinaSat 6B (ZX 6B) satellite was manufactured by Thales Alenia Space, based on the Spacebus 4000C2 platform. It had 38 transponders, and was used for TV transmissions and shortwave jamming across China, Southeast Asia, the Pacific and Oceania. It had a planned useful life of 15 years which ended in 2023. The launch, on a Long March 3B launch vehicle, was successfully conducted on 5 July 2007. The broadcast was used for some shortwave radio jamming purposes in China was carried on one of the Chinasat 6B transponders.

United States ITAR restrictions prohibited the export of satellite components for satellites launched on Chinese rockets. In response, Thales Alenia built ChinaSat 6B as an ITAR-free satellite, containing no restricted U.S. satellite components. However, the U.S. Department of State did not accept the ITAR-free status of these satellites and fined the U.S. company Aeroflex US$8 million for exporting satellite components. In 2013, Thales Alenia discontinued its ITAR-free satellite line.

Because of the problems encountered with ChinaSat 6B the construction of ChinaSat 6C (ZX 6C) was taken over by CAST with the satellite being based on the same bus of ChinaSat 6A. The satellite provides commercial communications services with twenty-five C-band transponders and supports high-quality and reliable uplink and downlink transmissions of programs for the radio and TV stations and cable TV networks. It was successfully launched onboard a CZ-3B/G3 launch vehicle on 9 March 2019 and it has since been positioned at the orbital slot of 130° East. On 26 December 2023, the satellite suffered malfunction to its thrusters and could not be repaired. Its condition remains healthy after efforts to stabilize the satellite were successful, however its lifespan has been reduced.

The next two satellites have been built using the upgraded DHF-4E bus and served as replacements for other satellites of the same family.

ChinaSat 6D (ZX-6D) was launched on 15 April 2022 at 12:00 from the Xichang Satellite Launch Center using a Long March 3B/E ad it is intended to replace ChinaSat 6A in its shortened than envisioned life span. It is equipped with twenty-five C-band transponders and it is positioned at the orbital slot of 130° East.

ChinaSat 6E (ZX-6E) was launched on 9 November 2023 at 11:23 UTC, from the Xichang Satellite Launch Center using a Long March 3B/E rocket from the LA-2 launch complex and it replaced the ChinaSat 6B (ZX 6B) on 26 December 2023 as per some local press release. Receiving stations also noted improved signal quality.

=== ChinaSat 7 ===
ChinaSat 7, a geosynchronous communications satellite launched in 1996, experienced third stage failure and a nearly unusable orbit.

=== ChinaSat 8 ===
ChinaSat 8 was built by Space Systems/Loral and scheduled for launch in April 1999 on a Long March 3B launch vehicle. However, the U.S. Department of State blocked its export to China under ITAR regulations. The satellite was sold to ProtoStar in 2006.

=== ChinaSat 9 ===
ChinaSat 9 (ZX-9) was built by Thales Alenia Space and it's based on the Spacebus 4000C2 satellite bus. It was launched on 9 June 2008 at 12:15 UTC from the Xichang Satellite Launch Center using a Long March 3B rocket. It was intended to act as a relay satellite for the 2008 Olympic Games, and to be subsequently used for general communications.

=== ChinaSat 9A/9B ===
ChinaSat 9A (ZX 9A) was initially intended to be a replacement for Sinosat's Sinosat-2 communication satellite with the name Sinosat-4, and as its predecessor it's based on the DFH-4 bus. In 2010 China Satcom took over the satellite and gave it the current name. It was launched on 16 June 2017 at 16:12 UTC from the Xichang Satellite Launch Center using a Long March 3B/E rocket, but failed to reach the intended orbit due to an upper stage failure. After 16 days of orbit raising maneuvers it reached the planned geosynchronous orbit, but at the expense of 10 years of lifespan (out of 15).

Due to its shorter than intended lifespan a replacement based on the upgraded DHF-4E bus, named ChinaSat 9B (ZX 9B), was launched on 9 September 2021 from the Xichang Satellite Launch Center using a Long March 3B/E rocket reaching its orbit without any issues.

=== ChinaSat 9C ===
ChinaSat 9C (ZX 9C) is a communications satellite that was launched on 10 June 2025 using a Long March 3B/E launch vehicle from the Xichang Satellite Launch Center. It is based on the DHF-4E bus and it is intended to replace the ChinaSat 9 satellite launched in 2008.

=== ChinaSat 10 ===
ChinaSat 10 was based on the DFH-4 bus. It was launched in 2011. Formerly known as SinoSat 5.

=== ChinaSat 10R ===
ChinaSat 10R (ZX 10R) is a communications satellite launched on 22 February 2025 at 12:11 UTC, from the Xichang Satellite Launch Center using a Long March 3B/E rocket from the LA-2 launch complex. The satellite will replace the ChinaSat 10 satellite launched in 2011.

=== ChinaSat 11 ===
ChinaSat 11 was based on the DFH-4 bus. It was launched in May 2013. ChinaSat 11 is used for Ninmedia, a free Indonesian TV network that provides many Indonesian TV stations.

=== ChinaSat 12 ===
ChinaSat 12 was launched in 2012. Formerly known as Apstar 7B. A backup of Apstar 7, Apstar 7B was acquired by China Satellite Communications from its subsidiary APT Satellite Holdings in 2010. It was based on Thales Alenia Space Spacebus-4000C2.

=== ChinaSat 15 ===
ChinaSat 15, aka Belintersat-1, was based on the DFH-4 satellite bus. It was launched on 16 January 2016, at 00:57 (Beijing time).

=== ChinaSat 16 ===
Initially known as Shijian 13 (SJ 13), the satellite was launched on 12 April 2017 at 11:04:04 UTC into geostationary transfer orbit using a Long March 3B/E launch vehicle. As the Shijian designation suggests, it is an experimental satellite that is supposed to test the electric propulsion of the DFH-4S satellite bus. The satellite has also been used for Ka-band high bandwidth communications experiments for in-flight internet services, achieving an internet access capability of 150 Mbit/s. After its experimental phase, it was transferred to China Satcom which is currently operating it as ChinaSat 16 (ZX 16).

=== ChinaSat 18 ===
ChinaSat 18 was launched at 12:03 UTC on 19 August 2019 from the Xichang Satellite Launch Center using a Long March-3B/E from the LA-2 launch complex. Although the launch was successful, the satellite would later malfunction in orbit and was later declared a total loss just after three months.

=== ChinaSat 19 ===
ChinaSat 19 (ZX 19) is a communications satellite launched on 5 November 2022 at 11:50 UTC from the Xichang Satellite Launch Center using a Long March-3B/E from the LA-2 launch complex. The satellite is presumed to carry out the original duties of the ChinaSat 18.

=== ChinaSat 26 ===
ChinaSat 26 (ZX 26) is a communications satellite launched on 23 February 2023 at 11:49 UTC, from the Xichang Satellite Launch Center using a Long March 3B/E rocket from the LA-2 launch complex. It's China's first high-throughput satellite with a previously unmatched capacity of over 100 Gbit/s.
