= ChinaSat 9A =

Chinese communications satellite

- Names: ZX-9A
- Mission type: Communications
- Operator: China Satellite Communications
- COSPAR ID: 2017-035A
- SATCAT no.: 42763
- Mission duration: 15 years (planned)

Spacecraft properties
- Bus: DFH-4
- Manufacturer: China Association for Science and Technology
- Launch mass: 5,100 kg (11,200 lb)

Start of mission
- Launch date: 18 June 2017, 16:10 UTC
- Rocket: Long March 3B
- Launch site: Xichang, LA-2
- Contractor: China Academy of Launch Vehicle Technology (CALT)

Orbital parameters
- Reference system: Geocentric orbit
- Regime: Geostationary orbit
- Longitude: 101.4° East

Transponders
- Coverage area: China

ChinaSat 9A (中星9A) originally developed as SinoSat 4, is a Chinese communications satellite operated by China Satellite Communications. It was initially intended to replace SinoSat 2, which experienced a malfunction after launch, but its own launch was postponed several times.

Launched on 19 June 2017 aboard a Long March 3B rocket from the Xichang Satellite Launch Center, it experienced a third-stage rocket malfunction that prevented it from entering its intended geostationary transfer orbit. The satellite subsequently reached geostationary orbit through autonomous manoeuvres, although the launch anomaly was expected to reduce its operational lifespan by ten years.

== History ==
ChinaSat 9A, originally developed by Sino Satellite Communications Co., Ltd. (SinoSat) and named SinoSat 4 (鑫诺四号), was a replacement for SinoSat 2, which experienced a post-launch malfunction. Its launch was originally scheduled for late 2008 but was later postponed. In 2010, the satellite was handed over to China Satcom and renamed ChinaSat 9A. Its launch was also further delayed.

== Launch ==
ChinaSat 9A was launched at 00:10 on 19 June 2017 (UTC+8) from Xichang Satellite Launch Center using a Long March 3B launch vehicle. A malfunction with the third stage of the rocket during the launch process led to a flight attitude anomaly, preventing the satellite from entering geostationary transfer orbit (GTO). It successfully entered geostationary orbit (GEO) later using autonomous orbit maneuvers; however, it was predicted that this attitude control error would lead to a reduction in on-orbit lifespan of ten years.

Investigators traced the launch anomaly to the roll control thruster of the Long March 3B's third stage, part of its attitude control system, during the coast phase between two burns of the stage's engine. The satellite separated from the stage in an incorrect orbit, tilted about 25.7 degrees to the equator, and deployed its solar arrays and antennas. After 10 orbit adjustments with its own thrusters it reached its planned position at 101.4° east on 5 July 2017, more than two weeks after launch.

According to China Satcom, ChinaSat 9A was China's first domestically built direct-to-home television broadcasting satellite. It carried eighteen 36 MHz and four 54 MHz Ku-band transponders, three receiving antennas and two transmitting antennas, to provide television and radio broadcasting and digital film and multimedia services to China, Hong Kong, Macau and Taiwan. Its design life was 15 years, with a designed reliability of 0.78 at the end of that period. Its replacement, ChinaSat 9B, was later launched, and Satbeams lists ChinaSat 9A as retired.
