= ChinaSat 10 =

Chinese communications satellite

- Mission type: Communications
- Operator: China Satellite Communications
- COSPAR ID: 2011-026A
- SATCAT no.: 37677
- Mission duration: 15 years

Spacecraft properties
- Bus: DFH-4
- Manufacturer: CAST
- Launch mass: 5,000 kilograms (11,000 lb)

Start of mission
- Launch date: 20 June 2011, 16:13:04 UTC
- Rocket: Long March 3B/E
- Launch site: Xichang LC-2

Orbital parameters
- Reference system: Geocentric
- Regime: Geostationary
- Longitude: 110.5° east
- Perigee altitude: 35,771 kilometres (22,227 mi)
- Apogee altitude: 35,814 kilometres (22,254 mi)
- Inclination: 0.02 degrees
- Period: 23.93 hours
- Epoch: 29 October 2013, 00:13:49 UTC

ChinaSat 10 (Chinese: 中星10号; pinyin: Zhōngxīng Shíhào) also known as Zhongxing-10, is a Chinese communications satellite operated by China Satellite Communications. Launched on 20 June 2011 aboard a Long March 3B rocket, it was developed to replace the aging ChinaSat 5B. The satellite carries 30 C-band and 16 Ku-band transponders, providing television broadcasting, direct-to-home services, data transmission, broadband multimedia and satellite communications across China and regions of Asia-Pacific, West Asia and South Asia.

== Instruments ==
ChinaSat 10 is a Chinese communications satellite. It was launched at 16:13 UTC on 20 June 2011 on a Long March 3B rocket. The satellite is a replacement for ChinaSat 5B. It has a mass of 5,100 kg and will be positioned in geosynchronous orbit at 110.5 degrees East. It is operated by China Satellite Communications.

The satellite, also known as Zhongxing-10, ZX-10, Xinnuo 5 and SupremeSat, carries 30 C-band and 16 Ku-band transponders, three receiving antennas and two transmitting antennas, and is powered by two deployable solar arrays and batteries. It serves China and the Asia-Pacific region, and according to its manufacturer it is also intended for some countries in West and South Asia, providing communications, satellite broadcasting, direct-to-home television, data transmission, VSAT networks and digital broadband multimedia and media streaming services. It replaced the aging ChinaSat 5B, formerly known as Sinosat 1 or Xinnuo 1. Its design life of 15 years ran to mid-2026.

ChinaSat 10 is equipped with 30 C-band and 16 Ku-band transponders, providing commercial satellite communication services. Its payload supports television broadcasting, data transmission, digital broadband multimedia and media streaming. The satellite was designed to serve China as well as countries and regions in the Asia-Pacific, West Asia and South Asia. It also provides telecommunications and very small aperture terminal (VSAT) network services, supporting business communications and broadcasting requirements across its coverage area.

== See also ==
- 2011 in spaceflight
