= Palapa-D =

Indonesian geostationary communications satellite

- Mission type: Communication
- Operator: Indosat Ooredoo
- COSPAR ID: 2009-046A
- SATCAT no.: 35812

Spacecraft properties
- Spacecraft type: Spacebus
- Bus: Spacebus-4000B3
- Manufacturer: Thales Alenia Space
- Launch mass: 4,100 kg (9,000 lb)
- Power: 6 kW

Start of mission
- Launch date: 31 August 2009, 09:28 UTC
- Rocket: Long March 3B / E
- Launch site: Xichang, LA-2
- Contractor: China Academy of Launch Vehicle Technology (CALT)
- Entered service: November 2009

End of mission
- Disposal: Graveyard orbit
- Deactivated: 31 August 2020 (officially)

Orbital parameters
- Reference system: Geocentric orbit
- Regime: Geostationary orbit
- Longitude: 113° East

Transponders
- Band: 40 transponders: 35 C-band; 5 Ku-band
- Coverage area: Parts of Europe, Asia, Middle East, Saudi Arabia, United Arab Emirates, Iran, Central Asia, South Asia, India, Southeast Asia, Thailand, Indonesia, East Asia, China, Korea, Japan, Mongolia, Oceania, Australia, New Zealand

Palapa-D was an Indonesian geostationary communications satellite which was operated by Indosat Ooredoo. It was built by Thales Alenia Space, based on the Spacebus-4000B3 satellite bus, and carries 35 C-band and 5 Ku-band transponders. It was positioned in geostationary orbit at a longitude of 113° East, where it replaced the Palapa-C2 satellite.

Indosat ordered Palapa-D from Thales Alenia Space on 2 July 2007. The satellite was built without using American components, and was therefore not restricted by U.S. International Traffic in Arms Regulations (ITAR), which allowed the China Great Wall Industry Corporation to be selected as a launch service provider.

== Launch ==
A Long March 3B launch vehicle, flying from Launch Area-2 at the Xichang Satellite Launch Centre was used to launch Palapa-D. A problem with the third stage of its carrier rocket left it in an incorrect orbit, which was subsequently corrected using the spacecraft's onboard propulsion system.

After launch, Palapa-D was to have separated from its launch vehicle into a geosynchronous transfer orbit (GTO), however one of its two identical upper-stage engines failed to deliver the necessary thrust, resulting in it reaching a lower orbit than planned. The S400 apogee motor of the satellite was subsequently used in for raise it into geostationary orbit.

== Recovery and operations ==
On 3 September 2009, the satellite's orbit was adjusted, placing it into a geostationary transfer orbit (GTO). It reached geostationary orbit on 9 September 2009. It underwent on-orbit testing, and arrived at its orbital slot of 113° East in mid-September 2009. After completing its testing, it is now being used to provide communications to Asia and Australia.

Palapa-D was built with a design life of fifteen years, but due to the expenditure of fuel during maneuvers to correct its orbit, it was expected to have enough fuel for about ten years of operations, according to Reynald Seznec, President of Thales Alenia Space.

Thales Alenia Space announced that the Palapa-D communications satellite is now positioned at its final location (113° East) and fully ready for operations for more than 10.5 years.
On 31 August 2020, Palapa-D was officially declared inadequate for operation after it was close to running out of fuel for stationkeeping and all of its transponder services were officially moved to Telkom-4 (Merah Putih) and BRIsat satellites for broadcasting and data services respectively.

=== Replacement ===
Palapa-D was planned to be replaced by the Nusantara Dua (Palapa-N1) satellite; the launch of Nusantara Dua on 9 April 2020 by Chinese Long March 3B/E launch vehicle was a failure, resulting in the loss of the satellite. A replacement satellite (Nusantara-2R or Palapa-N1R) to be built by the same manufacturer (China Academy of Space Technology/CAST) is being considered, albeit with possibly different specifications with the lost one. However, on 28 October 2021, Telkomsat awarded the replacement satellite (working designation HTS-113BT) contract to Thales Alenia Space instead of CAST using the Spacebus-4000B2 platform, with planned launch for 2024. The HTS-113BT is expected to have similar specifications to the lost one.

== See also ==
- 2009 in spaceflight
- List of Spacebus satellites
