= Zhongxing =

Zhongxing may refer to:

== Mainland China ==
- Zhongxing Prefecture, capital of Western Xia dynasty
- ZTE, or Zhong Xing Telecommunication Equipment Company Limited, a telecommunications equipment corporation
- ZX Auto, automobile manufacturer whose full name is Hebei Zhongxing Automobile
- Chinasat, a family of communications satellites whose phonetic translation is Zhongxing
  - Chinasat-9 (Zhongxing-9)

=== Towns ===
- Zhongxing, Anhui, Shou County (众兴镇)
- Zhongxing, Jiangsu, Siyang County (众兴镇)
- Zhongxing, Shan County, Shandong (终兴镇)
- Zhongxing, Shanghai, Chongming District (中兴镇)

== Taiwan ==
- Zhongxing Guesthouse (中興賓館), historical site in Taipei
- Zhongxing New Village (中興新村), in Nantou County, seat of Taiwan Province, Republic of China
- National Chung Hsing University, a university in Taichung

== Historical eras ==
- Zhongxing (386–394), era name used by Murong Yong, emperor of Western Yan
- Zhongxing (501–502), era name used by Emperor He of Southern Qi
- Zhongxing (531–532), era name used by Yuan Lang, emperor of Northern Wei
- Zhongxing (794) or Jungheung, era name used by Seong of Balhae
- Zhongxing (958), era name used by Li Jing (Southern Tang)

== See also ==
- Zhong Xing (1574–1625), Ming dynasty scholar and poet
