= ChinaSat 12 =

Communications satellite

- Illustration of ZX 15A
- Mission type: Communication
- Operator: China Satellite Communications
- COSPAR ID: 2012-067A
- SATCAT no.: 39017
- Website: english.csat.spacechina.com/n931903/c932043/content.html
- Mission duration: 15 years

Spacecraft properties
- Bus: Spacebus-4000C2
- Manufacturer: Thales Alenia Space
- Launch mass: 5,054 kilograms (11,142 lb)
- Power: 2 deployable solar arrays, batteries

Start of mission
- Launch date: 27 November 2012
- Rocket: Long March 3B/E
- Launch site: Xichang LA-2

Orbital parameters
- Reference system: Geocentric
- Regime: Geostationary
- Longitude: 87.5° East

Transponders
- Band: 28 C-band; 28 Ku-band
- Coverage area: China; Sri Lanka; East Asia; South Asia; Middle East; Africa; Australia; China sea area the Indian Ocean region.

The ChinaSat 12 (Chinese: 中星12号; pinyin: Zhōngxīng 12) is a Chinese communications satellite wholly owned by China Satellite Communications, with part of its communications payload leased to the Sri Lankan company SupremeSAT. Originally developed as Apstar 7B, it was acquired by China Satellite Communications from its subsidiary APT Satellite Holdings in 2010. Launched on 27 November 2012, the satellite was placed in geosynchronous orbit and initially positioned at 51.5° east for testing before moving to its operational location at 87.5° east in April 2013. It provides communications services across China, South Asia, the Middle East, Africa and other regions.

== Description ==
The ChinaSat 12 communications satellite is wholly owned by China Satellite Communications, with part of its communications payload leased or rented by SupremeSAT, a Sri Lankan company, to be marketed to potential users as SupremeSAT-I. Once operational, it will provide communications services for the China, Sri Lanka, East Asia, South Asia, Middle East, Africa, Australia, and China sea area, the Indian Ocean region.

ChinaSat 12 was also known as Apstar 7B (as a backup of Apstar 7), but acquired by China Satellite Communications from its subsidiary APT Satellite Holdings in 2010. However, APT Satellite Holdings was contracted by its parent company as the operator of ChinaSat 12.

== Orbit ==
The satellite was built by Thales Alenia Space and has a designed life of 15 years. Also known as ChiChi's Sat. The lease was reported at about $100 million for a set of leased transponders, and SupremeSAT has described a steerable spot beam of four high-power Ku-band transponders. The Observer Research Foundation notes that SupremeSAT leased only some of the satellite's transponders but was allowed to brand the lease as SupremeSat-1 and promote it as Sri Lanka's first communications satellite. A SupremeSAT statement says the project was a private commercial venture undertaken with China Great Wall Industry Corporation under an agreement signed in Beijing in 2011, with no Sri Lankan government funds, and that it was never presented as a Sri Lankan-owned satellite.

The branding drew political controversy in Sri Lanka. The then opposition leader, Ranil Wickremesinghe, asked whether Sri Lanka had launched its own satellite and whether China was using Sri Lanka's orbital slot, and a later government opened an investigation into alleged financial irregularities at SupremeSAT. Sri Lankan commentators have alleged links between the company and the family of then-president Mahinda Rajapaksa, while SupremeSAT states it is not owned by or affiliated with the family. In August 2025 the company confirmed that the satellite remains in orbit at 87.5° E.

== Gallery ==
Diagram of the Long March 3B, showing its outboard liquid rocket boosters.

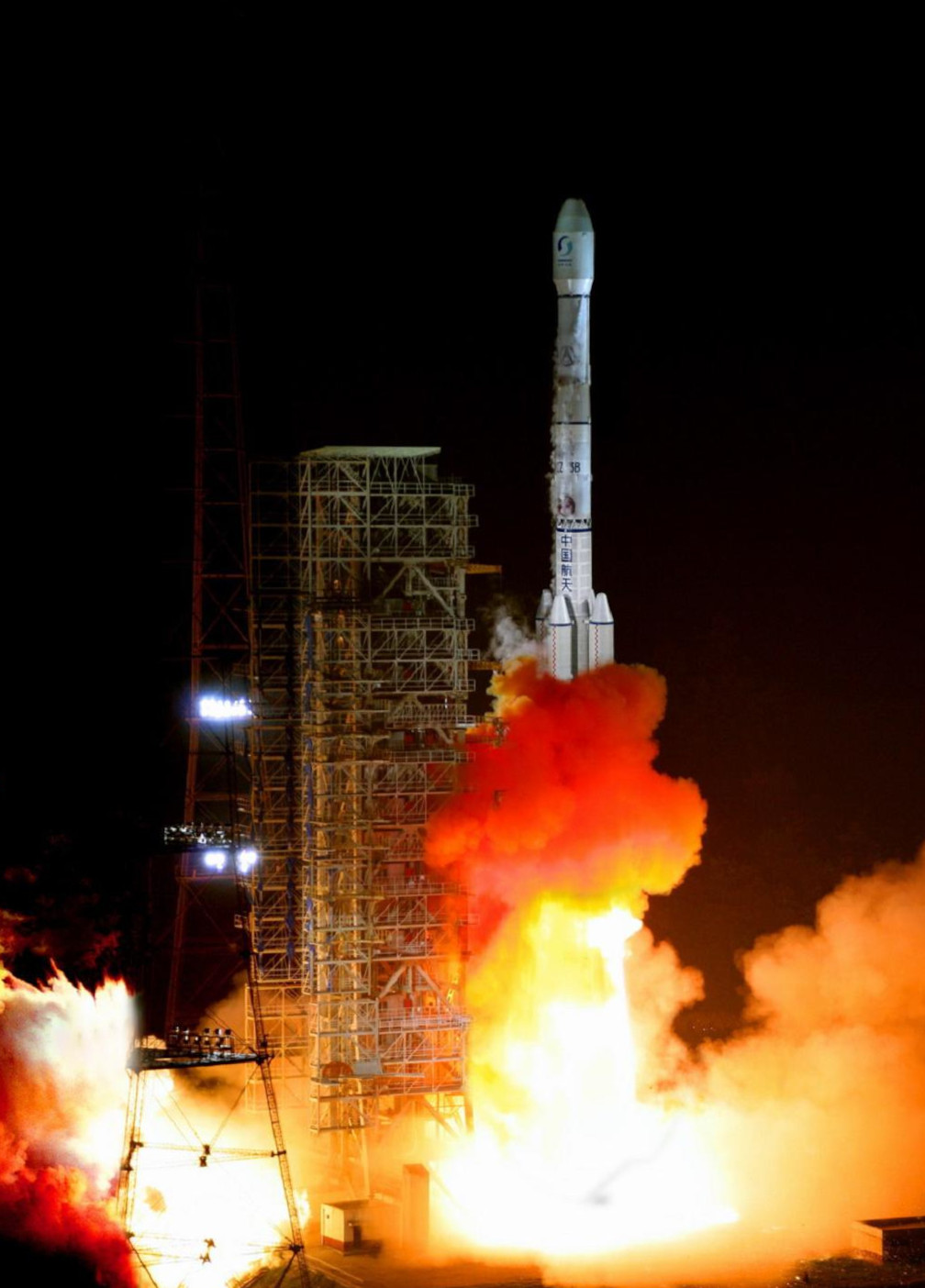
The launch of a Long March 3B (similar to CZ-3B/E (Chang Zheng-3B/E))
