= Shiyan (satellite) =

Chinese satellite program

- 实验卫星; Shíyàn Wèixīng

Program overview
- Country: People's Republic of China
- Purpose: Experimental
- Status: Active

Program history
- Duration: 2004–Present
- First flight: 18 April 2004
- Last flight: 17 August 2025
- Successes: 47
- Failures: 0
- Launch sites: TSLC; JSLC; WSLC; XSLC

Vehicle information
- Launch vehicles: Long March 2C; Long March 2D; Long March 3B; Long March 4B; Long March 4C; Long March 6; Long March 6A; Long March 7A; Long March 11; Kuaizhou 1A; Kinetica 1

Shiyan (SY, simplified Chinese: 实验; traditional Chinese: 實驗; pinyin: Shíyàn; lit. 'experiment') is a Chinese experimental satellite program consisting of a variety of test satellites. Given the classified nature of the satellites, Chinese government statements regarding the missions of Shiyan satellites follow the common refrain of agricultural monitoring and space environment observation — the same offered for other classified programs such as the Tongxin Jishu Shiyan, Yaogan, and Shijian programs. Alternatively named Tansuo satellites, Shiyan satellites occupy varying orbits including low Earth, polar Sun-synchronous, geosynchronous, and highly-elliptical orbits and are believed to accomplish a diverse set of missions from rendezvous proximity operations (RPO) to earth imaging. Though similarly named, the Shiyan satellite program is not to be confused with the separate Shijian satellite program.

== Notable satellites ==
=== Shiyan 7 ===
Shiyan 7 was launched from Taiyuan Satellite Launch Center (TSLC) on 19 July 2013 aboard a Launch March 4C rocket into low Earth, Sun-synchronous orbit, accompanied by the Shijian 15 (of unknown mission) and Chuangxin 3. Three weeks after launch, from 6–9 August 2013, Shiyan 7 performed rendezvous operations with its companion payload, Chuangxin-3, supporting speculations of a robotic arm-wielding satellite tasked with rendezvous proximity operations (RPO). Later, Shiyan 7 shifted to rendezvous with Shijian 7 (of unknown mission) with whom it maintained proximity from 19 to 20 August 2013 until it maneuvered into a 5 km lower orbit. Drawing further suspicion, around 19 October 2013, Shiyan 7 maneuvered to a 1 km higher orbit and released a previously untracked object, designated Shiyan 7B which many believe to be a subsatellite to RPO experiments. Such operations, which the Chinese government does not comment on, has sparked debate around the nature of Chinese experimental satellites.

== Satellites ==
Name	Launch	Orbit	Orbital apsis	Inclination	SCN	COSPAR ID	Launch site	Launcher	Status
Shiyan 1	18 April 2004	SSO	559.8 km × 572.9 km	98.0°	28220	2004-012A	XSLC	Long March 2C	Operational
Shiyan 2	18 November 2004	SSO	678.9 km × 702.5 km	98.1°	28479	2004-046A	XSLC	Long March 2C	Operational
Shiyan 3	5 November 2008	SSO	788.6 km × 809.7 km	98.7°	33433	2008-056A	JSLC	Long March 2D	Operational
Shiyan 4	20 November 2011	SSO	781.6 km × 816.2 km	98.7°	37931	2011-068B	JSLC	Long March 2D	Operational
Shiyan 5	25 November 2013	SSO	747.5 km × 770.0 km	98.2°	39455	2013-068A	JSLC	Long March 2D	Operational
Shiyan 6-01	19 November 2018	SSO	448.8 km × 541.0 km	97.4°	43711	2018-094B	JSLC	Long March 2D	Operational
Shiyan 6-02	4 July 2020	SSO	609.0 km × 799.1 km	98.2°	45859	2020-043A	JSLC	Long March 2D	Operational
Shiyan 6-03	8 April 2021	SSO	1,001.4 km × 1,126.5 km	99.5°	48157	2021-028A	TSLC	Long March 4B	Operational
Shiyan 7A	19 July 2013	SSO	665.3 k × 679.0 km	98.0°	39208	2013-037A	TSLC	Long March 4C	Operational
Shiyan 7B (subsat)	19 July 2013	SSO	670 km × 660 km	98.0°	39357	2013-037J	TSLC	Long March 4C	Operational
Shiyan 9	11 March 2021	GTO	35,738.5 km × 35,852 km	19.4°	47851	2021-019A	WSLC	Long March 7A	Operational
Shiyan 10	27 September 2021	Molniya	1,422.3 km × 38,950.6 km	63.7°	49258	2021-087A	XSLC	Long March 3B	Partially operational
Shiyan 10-02	29 December 2022	GTO	(Not yet announced)	(Not yet announced)	54878	2022-178A	XSLC	Long March 3B	Operational
Shiyan 11	24 November 2021	SSO	488.9 km × 502.0 km	97.5°	49501	2021-112A	JSLC	Kuaizhou 1A	Operational
Shiyan 12-01	23 December 2021	GEO	35,751.6 km × 35,758.8 km	0.2°	50321	2021-129A	WSLC	Long March 7A	Operational
Shiyan 12-02	23 December 2021	GEO	35,749.1 km × 35,773.1 km	0.2°	50322	2021-129B	WSLC	Long March 7A	Operational
Shiyan 13	17 January 2022	SSO	371.3 km × 1,272.0 km	98.6°	51102	2022-004A	TSLC	Long March 2D	Operational
Shiyan 14	24 September 2022	SSO	492.1 km × 514.7 km	97.5°	53884	2022-118A	TSLC	Kuaizhou 1A	Operational
Shiyan 15	24 September 2022	SSO	491.8 km × 510.5 km	97.5°	53885	2022-118B	TSLC	Kuaizhou 1A	Operational
Shiyan 16A	26 September 2022	SSO	509.1 km × 528.0 km	97.5°	53948	2022-121A	TSLC	Long March 6	Operational
Shiyan 16B	26 September 2022	SSO	509.6 km × 526.8 km	97.5°	53949	2022-121B	TSLC	Long March 6	Operational
Shiyan 17	26 September 2022	SSO	508.1 km × 527.0 km	97.5°	53950	2022-121C	TSLC	Long March 6	Operational
Shiyan 19	15 March 2023	SSO	500.1 km × 520.9 km	97.5°	55861	2023-034A	JSLC	Long March 11	Operational
Shiyan 20A	12 December 2022	LEO	800.3 km × 806.6 km	60.0°	54699	2022-169A	JSLC	Long March 4C	Operational
Shiyan 20B	12 December 2022	LEO	798.5 km × 808.1 km	60.0°	54700	2022-169B	JSLC	Long March 4C	Operational
Shiyan 20C	29 October 2022	LEO	799.5 km x 816.0 km	60.0°	54214	2022-142A	JSLC	Long March 2D	Operational
Shiyan 21	16 December 2022	LEO	480.8 km × 498.5 km	36.0°	54752	2022-172A	XSLC	Long March 11	Operational
Shiyan 22A	13 January 2023	LEO	504.3 km × 521.9 km	43.2°	55242	2023-006A	JSLC	Long March 2D	Operational
Shiyan 22B	13 January 2023	LEO	510.6 km × 526.3 km	43.2°	55243	2023-006B	JSLC	Long March 2D	Operational
Shiyan 23	11 May 2024	SSO	624.6 km × 633.8 km	97.8°	59728	2024-089A	JSLC	Long March 4C	Operational
Shiyan 24A	7 June 2023	SSO					JSLC	Kinetica 1	Operational
Shiyan 24B	7 June 2023	SSO					JSLC	Kinetica 1	Operational
Shiyan 24C-01	25 December 2023	SSO	583.9 km × 589.3 km	97.3°	58650	2023-206A	Bo Run Jiu Zhou platform, South China Sea	Long March 11	Operational
Shiyan 24C-02	25 December 2023	SSO	584.4 km × 588.5 km	97.3°	58651	2023-206B	Bo Run Jiu Zhou platform, South China Sea	Long March 11	Operational
Shiyan 24C-03	25 December 2023	SSO	584.7 km × 587.9 km	97.3°	58652	2023-206C	Bo Run Jiu Zhou platform, South China Sea	Long March 11	Operational
Shiyan 25	20 June 2023	SSO	272.5 km × 288.2 km	96.5°	57047	2023-087A	TSLC	Long March 6	Operational
Shiyan 26A	11 November 2024	SSO					JSLC	Kinetica 1	Operational
Shiyan 26B	11 November 2024	SSO					JSLC	Kinetica 1	Operational
Shiyan 26C	11 November 2024	SSO					JSLC	Kinetica 1	Operational
Shiyan 27A	18 April 2025	SSO	1,052.1 km × 1,053.6 km	99.7°	63599	2025-078A	TSLC	Long March 6A	Operational
Shiyan 27B	18 April 2025	SSO	1,052.2 km × 1,053.5 km	99.7°	63600	2025-078B	TSLC	Long March 6A	Operational
Shiyan 27C	18 April 2025	SSO	1,052.0 km × 1,053.7 km	99.7°	63601	2025-078C	TSLC	Long March 6A	Operational
Shiyan 27D	18 April 2025	SSO	1,052.1 km × 1,053.6 km	99.7°	63602	2025-078D	TSLC	Long March 6A	Operational
Shiyan 27E	18 April 2025	SSO	1,052.1 km × 1,053.6 km	99.7°	63603	2025-078E	TSLC	Long March 6A	Operational
Shiyan 27F	18 April 2025	SSO	1,052.0 km × 1,053.7 km	99.7°	63604	2025-078F	TSLC	Long March 6A	Operational
Shiyan 28B-01	3 July 2025	LEO	798.9 km × 802.9 km	11.0°	64753	2025-145A	XSLC	Long March 4C	Operational
Shiyan 28B-02	17 August 2025	LEO	790.9 km × 796.4 km	11.0°	65226	2025-177A	XSLC	Long March 4C	Operational
Shiyan 29	5 September 2025	GEO					XSLC	Long March 3C/E / YZ-1	Operational
Shiyan 30A	29 September 2025	LEO					XSLC	Long March 2D	Operational
Shiyan 30B	29 September 2025	LEO					XSLC	Long March 2D	Operational
Shiyan 30C	12 March 2026	LEO					XSLC	Long March 2D	Operational
Shiyan 30D	12 March 2026	LEO					XSLC	Long March 2D	Operational
Shiyan 31	13 October 2025	LEO					JSLC	Long March 2D	Operational
Shiyan 32-01	8 November 2025	SSO					Bo Run Jiu Zhou platform, South China Sea	Long March 11	Operational
Shiyan 32-02	8 November 2025	SSO					Bo Run Jiu Zhou platform, South China Sea	Long March 11	Operational
Shiyan 32-03	8 November 2025	SSO					Bo Run Jiu Zhou platform, South China Sea	Long March 11	Operational
Sources: NASA, US Space Force, CelesTrak

== See also ==
- Yaogan (YG)
- Shijian (SJ)
- Tongxin Jishu Shiyan (TJS)
