= Apstar 7 =

Chinese communications satellite

- Mission type: Communication
- Operator: APT Satellite
- COSPAR ID: 2012-013A
- SATCAT no.: 38107
- Website: www.apstar.com/en/apstar-fleet/apstar-7/
- Mission duration: 15 years

Spacecraft properties
- Bus: Spacebus-4000C2
- Manufacturer: Thales Alenia Space
- Launch mass: 5,054 kilograms (11,142 lb)

Start of mission
- Launch date: 31 March 2012, 10:27 UTC
- Rocket: Chang Zheng 3B/E
- Launch site: Xichang LC-2

Orbital parameters
- Reference system: Geocentric
- Regime: Geostationary
- Longitude: 76.5° East
- Perigee altitude: 35,784 kilometres (22,235 mi)
- Apogee altitude: 35,802 kilometres (22,246 mi)
- Inclination: 0.04 degrees
- Period: 23.93 hours
- Epoch: 19 December 2013, 16:37:15 UTC

Apstar-7 is a Chinese communications satellite which is operated by APT Satellite as part of the Apstar system. It was launched in 2012 as a replacement for the Apstar 2R satellite launched in 1997.

Apstar-7 was constructed by Thales Alenia Space, and is based on the Spacebus-4000C2 satellite bus. The satellite had a mass at launch of 5,054 kilograms (11,142 lb), and is expected to operate for at least 15 years. It is positioned in geostationary orbit at a longitude of 76.5 degrees East, and carries 56 transponders with an operating power of 8.4 kilowatts; 28 operating in the C band and providing services to Asia, Africa, eastern and central Europe and Australia and the other 28 operating in the K_{u} band, covering Africa, the Middle East, China, and Taiwan. The satellite's solar arrays generate 11.4 kilowatts of power.

Apstar-7 was launched by a Long March 3B/E carrier rocket, flying from Launch Complex 2 at the Xichang Satellite Launch Centre. Liftoff took place at 10:27 UTC on 31 March 2012, with the rocket placing the satellite into a supersynchronous transfer orbit.

== Operational history ==
Thales Alenia Space built Apstar-7 as an ITAR-free satellite, containing no restricted American components. The United States prohibits the export of satellite components when a Chinese launcher will be used. Ironically, the US Department of Defense leased bandwidth on Apstar-7 in May 2012 to improve communications with the U.S. Africa Command. In 2013, Thales Alenia was forced to discontinue its ITAR-free satellite line after US supplier Aeroflex admitted that it had sold them ITAR-controlled components.

== See also ==
- 2012 in spaceflight
- List of Spacebus satellites
