= Long March 3 rocket family =

The Long March 3 rocket family includes :

- Long March 3
- Long March 3A
- Long March 3B
- Long March 3B/E
- Long March 3C
- Long March 3C/E

and is part of the entire Long March (rocket family).

The Long March 3 family are intended for GTO launches, and have a hydrolox 3rd stage.

== Specifications of all LM-3 types ==
Specifications
Series	3	3A	3B	3B/E	3C	3C/E
Model	Long March 3	Long March 3A	Long March 3B	Long March 3B/E	Long March 3C	Long March 3C/E
Stages	3	3	3 (plus 4 strap-on boosters)	3 (plus 4 strap-on boosters)	3 (plus 2 strap-on boosters)	3 (plus 2 strap-on boosters)
Length (m)	43.2	52.5	54.8	56.3	54.8	56.3
Max. diameter (m)	3.35	3.35	3.35	3.35	3.35	3.35
Liftoff mass (t)	204	241	426	459	345	378
Liftoff thrust (kN)	2,962	2,962	5,923	5,923	4,442	4,442
Payload (LEO, kg)	5,000	8,500	11,500	11,500	8,000	8,000
Payload (GTO, kg)	1,500	2,600	5,100	5,500	3,800	3,900

== Summary Launch statistics for all LM-3 types ==
The following launch statistics are gathered from the individual Wikipedia pages of each CZ-3x variants as those pages are updated more frequently by various editors; the numbers are current as of 28 May 2025.

Long March 3 (rocket family)
Derivatives	Status	First flight	Launches	Successes	Failures	Partial failures
Long March 3	Retired	29 January 1984	13	10	2	1
Long March 3A	Retired	8 February 1994	27	27	0	0
Long March 3B	Retired	14 February 1996	12	10	1	1
Long March 3B/E	Active	13 May 2007	97	95	1	1
Long March 3C	Retired	25 April 2008	12	12	0	0
Long March 3C/E	Active	23 October 2014	7	7	0	0
