= Apstar 6C =

Chinese communications satellite

- Mission type: Communications satellite
- Operator: APT Satellite Holdings
- COSPAR ID: 2018-041A
- SATCAT no.: 43450
- Website: Apstar 6C

Start of mission
- Launch date: 16:06, May 3, 2018 (UTC)
- Rocket: Long March 3B
- Launch site: Xichang Satellite Launch Center

Orbital parameters
- Reference system: Geocentric
- Regime: Geostationary

Transponders
- Band: K_{u} band

Apstar 6C is a Chinese communications satellite which is operated by APT Satellite Holdings as part of the Apstar system.
