= APT Satellite Holdings =

Bermuda-incorporated holding company

APT Satellite Holdings Limited
- Company type: public company
- Traded as: SEHK: 1045
- Industry: Telecommunications
- Founded: 1992; 34 years ago (as APT Satellite)
- Founder: Ministry of Aeronautics and Astronautics
Headquarters
Hong Kong	(de facto)
Bermuda	(registered office)
- Brands: Apstar
- Services: Satellite communications; Satellite TV signals
- Revenue: ▲HK$1.230 billion (2016)
- Operating income: ▼HK$632 million (2016)
- Net income: ▼HK$494 million (2016)
- Total equity: ▲HK$4.849 billion (2016)
Owner
Chinese Government and other investors (via APT Satellite International)	(51.77%)
Chinese Government via CASC	(2.90%)
Temasek Holdings	(5.51%)
International Value Adviser	(5.12%)
Parent
APT Satellite International	(direct)
China Satcom	(intermediate)
CASC	(intermediate)
The SASAC	(intermediate)
The State Council	(ultimate)
- Subsidiaries: APT Satellite (100%)
- Website: www.apstar.com
- Footnotes / references in consolidated financial statement

Chinese name
- Traditional Chinese: 亞太衛星控股有限公司
- Simplified Chinese: 亚太卫星控股有限公司
- Literal meaning: Asia Pacific Satellite Holding, Limited Company
Transcriptions
Standard Mandarin
- Hanyu Pinyin: Yàtài wèixīng kònggǔ yǒuxiàn gōngsī

short name
- Traditional Chinese: 亞太衛星
- Simplified Chinese: 亚太卫星
- Literal meaning: Asia Pacific Satellite
Transcriptions
Standard Mandarin
- Hanyu Pinyin: Yàtài wèixīng

APT Satellite Holdings Limited is a Bermuda-incorporated holding company. Its Hong Kong-incorporated subsidiary APT Satellite Co., Ltd. is the operator of the Apstar satellite constellation. APT Satellite Holdings and APT Satellite are headquartered in Hong Kong.

As at 30 June 2016 the company had a market capitalisation of HK$3.816 billion. It is a red chip company, as it was an overseas incorporated company, but controlled by the Chinese Government indirectly (via China Aerospace Science and Technology Corporation). Fellow Hong Kong–based satellite company AsiaSat was also partially owned by the Chinese Government (via CITIC Group), but belongs to a different department of the State Council.

== History ==
The establishment of APT Satellite Company Limited was officially approved by the State Council of the People's Republic of China on 26 March 1992, the company's incorporation on 21 January 1992 as Free Union Limited, renaming to Trans-Asia-Pacific Satellite Communications Co., Ltd. on 10 March, then APT Satellite Co., Ltd. on 15 April 1992. APT Satellite is a red chip company was listed on the Hong Kong Stock Exchange on 18 December 1996.

== Businesses ==
APT Satellite Holdings, via wholly owned subsidiary APT Satellite Company Limited ("APT Satellite" or "APSTAR") owns and operates five in-orbit satellites: APSTAR-7, APSTAR-9, APSTAR-5C, APSTAR-6C and APSTAR-6D satellite ("APSTAR Satellite Fleet"), covering regions in Asia, Europe, Africa, Australia and Pacific island which contain approximately 75% of the world's population.

=== List of satellites ===
- Apstar 1 (Chinasat-5E)
- Apstar 1A
- Apstar 2
- Apstar 2R
- Apstar 5
- Telstar 18V/Apstar 5C
- Apstar 6
- Apstar 6C
- Apstar 6D
- Apstar 6E
- Apstar 7
- Apstar 7B
- Apstar 9
- Apstar 9A (Chinasat-5A)

== Equity investments ==
As of 31 December 2016

- CNC Holdings (3.49%)

== Shareholders ==
As of 31 December 2016, the largest shareholder of APT Satellite Holdings was APT Satellite International for 51.77% shares; APT Satellite International was 42.86% owned by Chinese state-owned China Aerospace Science and Technology Corporation (CASC) indirectly, via a non-wholly owned subsidiary China Satellite Communications; China Satellite Communications owned an additional 1.45% shares of APT Satellite Holdings via another subsidiary: "China Satellite Communications (Hong Kong)". Moreover, CASC owned an additional 14.29% stake of APT Satellite International, via another wholly owned subsidiary China Great Wall Industry Corporation. Lastly, CASC owned 1.45% shares of APT Satellite Holdings directly. To sum up, CASC consortium owned about 54.67% shares of APT Satellite Holdings and CASC owned about 57.15% stake of its intermediate holding company APT Satellite International. CASC acquired the aforementioned 14.29% shares of APT Satellite International from its listed subsidiary China Aerospace International Holdings in 2011, by purchasing a company CASIL Satellite for HK$132.3 million.

In 2003, the other shareholders of APT Satellite International were China Satellite Communications (at that time a separate state-owned enterprise from CASC); SingaSat, a wholly owned subsidiary of Singtel; and Kwang Hua Development and Investment, a Hong Kong company co-owned by Ruentex Group and China Development Corporation.

The second largest shareholder of APT Satellite Holdings was Temasek Holdings for 5.51% shares. It was followed by International Value Adviser, LLC for 5.12%.

== See also ==
- China Aerospace International Holdings, sister company in Hong Kong
- China Energine, sister company in Hong Kong
