= ChinaSat 9 =

Chinese communications satellite

- Names: ZX-9
- Mission type: Communications
- Operator: China Telecommunications Broadcast Satellite Corporation
- COSPAR ID: 2008-028A
- SATCAT no.: 33051
- Mission duration: 15 years (planned); 17 years, 6 months, 20 days (30 December 2025)

Spacecraft properties
- Bus: Spacebus 4000C2
- Manufacturer: Thales Alenia Space
- Launch mass: 4,500 kg (9,900 lb)

Start of mission
- Launch date: 9 June 2008, 12:15:04 UTC
- Rocket: Long March 3B
- Launch site: Xichang, LA-2
- Contractor: China Academy of Launch Vehicle Technology (CALT)

Orbital parameters
- Reference system: Geocentric orbit
- Regime: Geostationary orbit
- Longitude: 92.2° East

Transponders
- Band: 22 Ku-band transponders

ChinaSat 9 (Chinese: 中星9号; pinyin: Zhōngxīng Jiǔhào), also known as ZX-9, is a Chinese communications satellite.

== Launch ==
It was launched from pad 2 at the Xichang Satellite Launch Centre on 9 June 2008, at 12:15:04 UTC, by a Long March 3B launch vehicle. It is based on the Spacebus 4000C2 satellite bus, and was constructed in France by Thales Alenia Space in its Cannes Mandelieu Space Center. It is one of several ChinaSat spacecraft in orbit.

== Mission ==
It was launched to act as a relay satellite for the 2008 Olympic Games, and will subsequently be used for general communications. Equipped with 22 Ku-band transponders, it was placed in geosynchronous orbit at a longitude of 92.2° East.
