= Moonport =

A Moonport is a spaceport capable of sending vehicles to the Moon. It may refer to:

- Baikonur Cosmodrome, a rocket launch complex in Kazakhstan, used by Russia
- Kennedy Space Center, a launch operations site in Florida, used by NASA
  - Kennedy Space Center Launch Complex 39, used for the Apollo and Space Shuttle programs
- Satish Dhawan Space Centre, a rocket launch centre in Andhra Pradesh, India
- Xichang Satellite Launch Center, a Chinese satellite launch facility
