= Long March 3C =

Chinese orbital carrier rocket

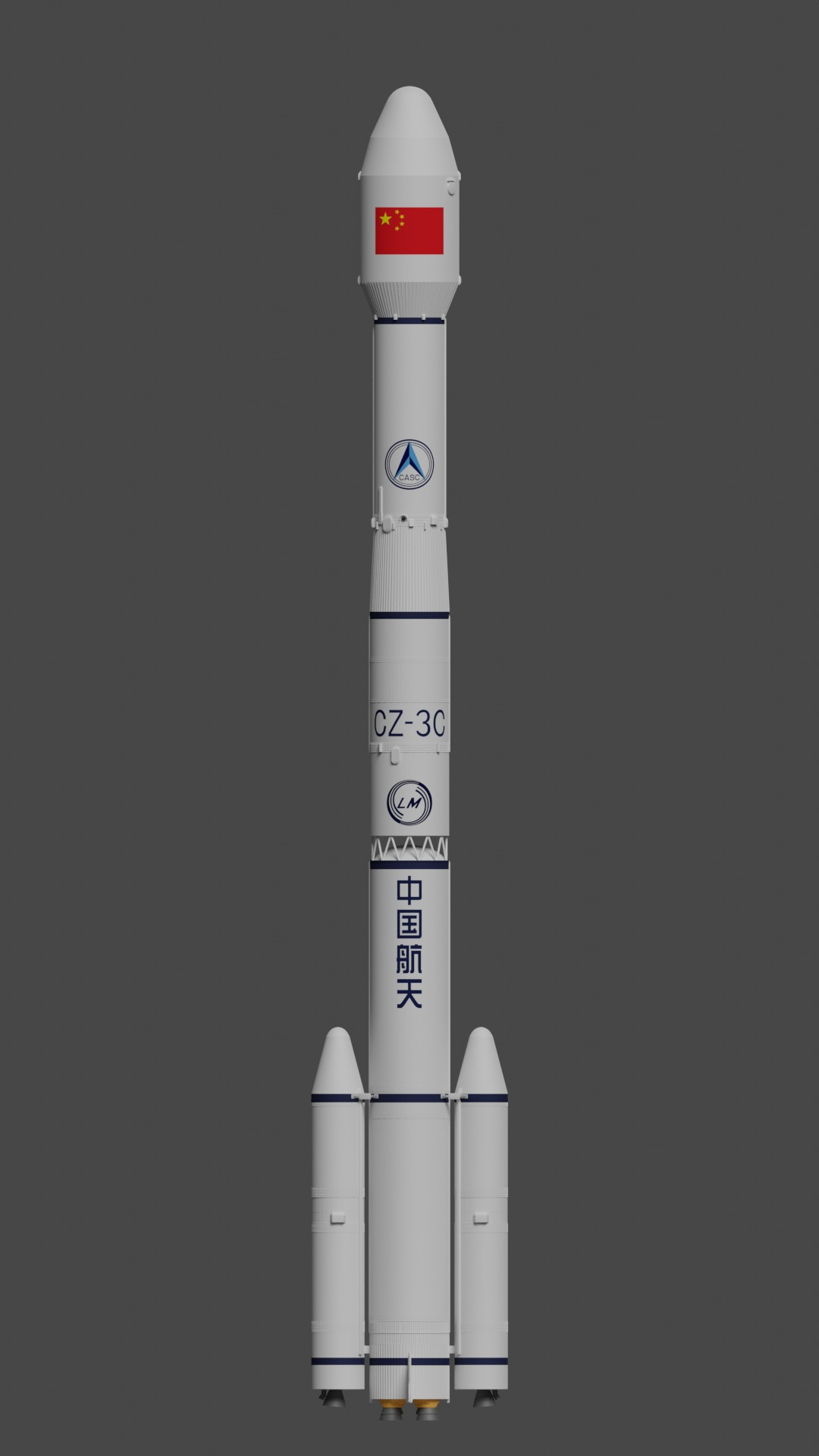
- Rendering of Long March 3C
- Function: Medium-lift launch vehicle
- Manufacturer: China Academy of Launch Vehicle Technology
- Country of origin: China

Size
- Height: 3C: 54.8 m (180 ft); 3C/E: 55.64 m (182.5 ft)
- Diameter: 3.35 m (11.0 ft)
- Mass: 345,000 kg (761,000 lb)
- Stages: 3

Capacity

Payload to LEO
- Mass: 3C: 8,000 kg (18,000 lb); 3C/E: 8,000 kg (18,000 lb)

Payload to GTO
- Mass: 3C: 3,800 kg (8,400 lb); 3C/E: 3,900 kg (8,600 lb)

Payload to HCO
- Mass: 2,400 kg (5,300 lb)

Associated rockets
- Family: Long March

Launch history
- Status: Active
- Launch sites: XSLC, LA-2 and LA-3
- Total launches: 20; 3C: 12; 3C/E: 8
- Success(es): 20; 3C: 12; 3C/E: 8
- First flight: 3C: 25 April 2008; 3C/E: 23 October 2014
- Last flight: 3C: 1 February 2016; 3C/E: 5 September 2025
- Carries passengers or cargo: Chang'e 2, Chang'e 5-T1

Boosters (3C)
- No. boosters: 2
- Height: 15.33 m (50.3 ft)
- Diameter: 2.25 m (7 ft 5 in)
- Propellant mass: 37,700 kg (83,100 lb)
- Powered by: 1 YF-25
- Maximum thrust: 740.4 kN (166,400 lb_{f})
- Specific impulse: 2,556.2 m/s (8,386 ft/s)
- Burn time: 127 seconds
- Propellant: N_{2}O_{4} / UDMH

Boosters (3C/E)
- No. boosters: 2
- Height: 16.1 m (53 ft)
- Diameter: 2.25 m (7 ft 5 in)
- Propellant mass: 41,100 kg (90,600 lb)
- Powered by: 1 YF-25
- Maximum thrust: 740.4 kN (166,400 lb_{f})
- Specific impulse: 2,556.2 m/s (8,386 ft/s)
- Burn time: 140 seconds
- Propellant: N_{2}O_{4} / UDMH

First stage (3C)
- Height: 23.27 m (76.3 ft)
- Diameter: 3.35 m (11.0 ft)
- Propellant mass: 171,800 kg (378,800 lb)
- Powered by: 4 YF-21C
- Maximum thrust: 2,961.6 kN (665,800 lb_{f})
- Specific impulse: 2,556.5 m/s (8,387 ft/s)
- Burn time: 145 seconds
- Propellant: N_{2}O_{4} / UDMH

First stage (3C/E)
- Height: 24.76 m (81.2 ft)
- Diameter: 3.35 m (11.0 ft)
- Propellant mass: 186,200 kg (410,500 lb)
- Powered by: 4 YF-21C
- Maximum thrust: 2,961.6 kN (665,800 lb_{f})
- Specific impulse: 2,556.5 m/s (8,387 ft/s)
- Burn time: 158 seconds
- Propellant: N_{2}O_{4} / UDMH

Second stage
- Height: 12.92 m (42.4 ft)
- Diameter: 3.35 m (11.0 ft)
- Propellant mass: 49,400 kg (108,900 lb)
- Powered by: 1 YF-24E (YF-22E (Main); 4 x YF-23C (Vernier))
- Maximum thrust: 742 kN (167,000 lb_{f}) (Main); 47.1 kN (10,600 lb_{f}) (Vernier)
- Specific impulse: 2,922.57 m/s (9,588.5 ft/s) (Main); 2,910.5 m/s (9,549 ft/s) (Vernier)
- Burn time: 185 seconds
- Propellant: N_{2}O_{4} / UDMH

Third stage
- Height: 12.38 m (40.6 ft)
- Diameter: 3.0 m (9.8 ft)
- Propellant mass: 18,200 kg (40,100 lb)
- Powered by: 2 × YF-75
- Maximum thrust: 167.17 kN (37,580 lb_{f})
- Specific impulse: 4,295 m/s (14,090 ft/s)
- Burn time: 487 seconds
- Propellant: LH_{2} / LOX

Fourth stage (optional) – YZ-1
- Powered by: 1 × YF-50D
- Maximum thrust: 6.5 kN (1,500 lb_{f})
- Specific impulse: 315.5 s (3.094 km/s)
- Propellant: N_{2}O_{4} / UDMH

The Long March 3C (simplified Chinese: 长征三号丙火箭; traditional Chinese: 長征三號丙火箭; pinyin: Chángzhēng Sānhào Bǐng Huǒjiàn), also known as the Changzheng 3C, CZ-3C and LM-3C, is a Chinese orbital launch vehicle. It is launched from Launch Complex 2 and 3 at the Xichang Satellite Launch Center (XSLC). A three-stage rocket with two strap-on liquid rocket boosters, it is a member of the Long March 3 rocket family, and was derived from the Long March 3B. It was designed to fill a gap in payload capacities between the Long March 3A and 3B.

== Launch statistics ==
- Failure
- Partial failure
- Success
- Planned

== Launches ==
It made its maiden flight on 25 April 2008, at 15:35 UTC. The payload for the first launch was the Tianlian I-01 data relay communications satellite. The second carried the Compass-G2 navigation satellite and was conducted on 14 April 2009. The third launch was made on 16 January 2010, with the Compass-G1 satellite. The fourth carrying the Compass-G3 navigation satellite was launched on 2 June 2010. On 1 October 2010, it successfully launched China's second lunar probe, Chang'e 2.

An enhanced version, named Long March 3C/E, debuted during the launch of Chang'e 5-T1 on 23 October 2014. On 30 March 2015, the Yuanzheng upper stage was used on top of a Long March 3C launch vehicle for the first time.

== List of launches ==
Flight number	Serial number	Date (UTC)	Launch site	Version	Payload	Orbit	Result
1	Y1	25 April 2008; 15:35	XSLC, LA-2	3C	Tianlian I-01	GTO	Success
2	Y3	14 April 2009; 16:16	XSLC, LA-2	3C	Compass-G2	GTO	Success
3	Y2	16 January 2010; 16:12	XSLC, LA-2	3C	Compass-G1	GTO	Success
4	Y4	2 June 2010; 15:53	XSLC, LA-2	3C	Compass-G3	GTO	Success
5	Y7	1 October 2010; 10:59	XSLC, LA-2	3C	Chang'e 2	LTO	Success
6	Y5	31 October 2010; 16:26	XSLC, LA-2	3C	Compass-G4	GTO	Success
7	Y8	11 July 2011; 15:41	XSLC, LA-2	3C	Tianlian I-02	GTO	Success
8	Y6	24 February 2012; 16:12	XSLC, LA-2	3C	Compass-G5	GTO	Success
9	Y9	25 July 2012; 15:43	XSLC, LA-2	3C	Tianlian I-03	GTO	Success
10	Y10	25 October 2012; 15:33	XSLC, LA-2	3C	Compass-G6	GTO	Success
11	Y12	23 October 2014; 18:00	XSLC, LA-2	3C/E	Chang'e 5-T1	LTO	Success
12	Y11	30 March 2015; 13:52	XSLC, LA-2	3C / YZ-1	BDS I1-S	GSO	Success
13	Y14	1 February 2016; 07:29	XSLC, LA-2	3C / YZ-1	BDS M3-S	MEO	Success
14	Y15	12 June 2016; 15:30	XSLC, LA-3	3C/E	Compass-G7	GTO	Success
15	Y13	22 November 2016; 15:24	XSLC, LA-2	3C/E	Tianlian I-04	GTO	Success
16	Y17	24 December 2018; 16:53	XSLC, LA-3	3C/E	TJS-3	GTO	Success
17	Y16	17 May 2019; 15:48	XSLC, LA-2	3C/E	Compass-G8	GTO	Success
18	Y18	6 July 2021; 15:53	XSLC, LA-2	3C/E	Tianlian I-05	GTO	Success
19	Y19	12 May 2025; 18:09	XSLC, LA-3	3C/E	TJS-19	GTO	Success
20	Y20 (YZ-1 Y18)	5 September 2025; 02:34	XSLC, LA-2	3C/E + YZ-1	Shiyan 29	GSO	Success

== See also ==
- List of Long March launches (2025-2029)
