= Belintersat-1 =

Telecommunications satellite

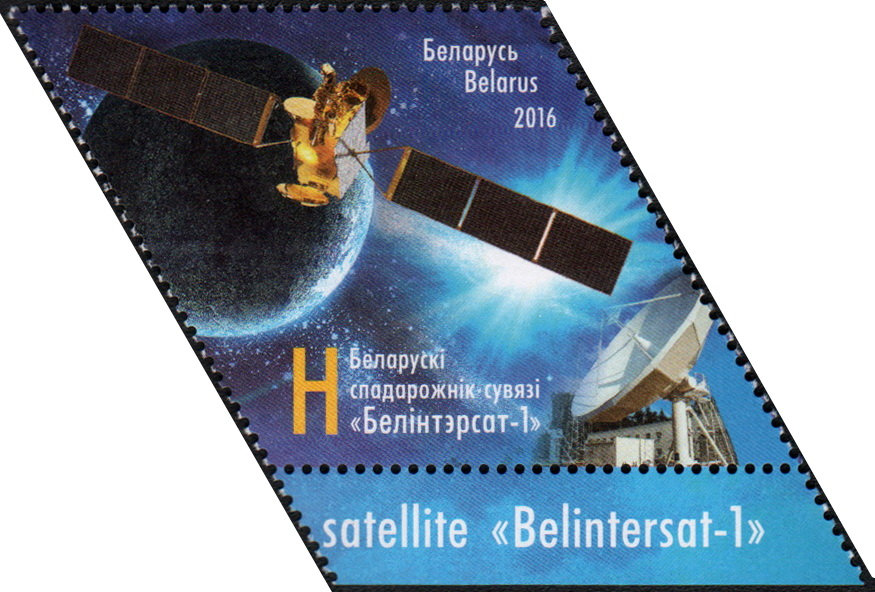
- Belintersat-1 on a 2016 stamp of Belarus
- Mission type: Telecommunicational services
- Operator: Belintersat
- COSPAR ID: 2016-001A
- SATCAT no.: 41238
- Website: en.belintersat.com/system/belintersat-1
- Mission duration: 15 years (planned)

Spacecraft properties
- Bus: DFH-4
- Manufacturer: China Aerospace Science and Technology Corporation; Thales Alenia Space
- Launch mass: 5,223 kilograms (11,515 lb)
- Dry mass: 2,086 kilograms (4,599 lb)
- Power: 10,150 watts

Start of mission
- Launch date: 15 January 2016
- Rocket: Long March CZ-3B/E
- Launch site: Xichang Satellite Launch Center
- Contractor: China Aerospace Science and Technology Corporation

Orbital parameters
- Reference system: Geocentric
- Regime: Geosynchronous
- Longitude: 51.5° E

Belintersat-1 is a deployed geostationary telecommunications satellite, manufactured by the China Aerospace Science and Technology Corporation (CASC) and Thales Alenia Space for the Belarusian government's company Belintersat.

It provides a wide range of telecommunicational services, including satellite TV and radio broadcasting and broadband internet access. It lifted off on a Chinese Long March CZ-3B/E rocket from Xichang Satellite Launch Center (XSLC) on January 15, 2016, 16:57 GMT.

== See also ==
- 2016 in spaceflight
