= Badr-1 =

Pakistani digital communication satellite

- The display of Badr-1, prior to its launch.
- Mission type: Technology
- Operator: SUPARCO
- COSPAR ID: 1990-059A
- SATCAT no.: 20685
- Website: suparco.gov.pk/pages/badr1.asp
- Mission duration: 35 days (achieved)

Spacecraft properties
- Manufacturer: SUPARCO
- Launch mass: 52 kilograms (115 lb)
- Power: 12.5 watts

Start of mission
- Launch date: 12 July 1990, 00:40:00 UTC
- Rocket: Long March 2E
- Launch site: Xichang, LA-2

End of mission
- Last contact: 21 August 1990
- Decay date: 9 December 1990

Orbital parameters
- Reference system: Geocentric orbit
- Regime: Low Earth orbit
- Perigee altitude: 201.0 kilometres (124.9 mi)
- Apogee altitude: 984.0 kilometres (611.4 mi)
- Inclination: 28.4°
- Period: 96.3 minutes

Badr-1 (Urdu: بدر-۱, meaning Full Moon-A) was the first artificial and the first digital communications satellite launched by Pakistan's national space authority — the SUPARCO — in 1990. The Badr-1 was Pakistan's first indigenously developed and manufactured digital communications and an experimental artificial satellite which was launched into low Earth orbit by Pakistan on 16 July 1990, through a Chinese carrier rocket. The launch ushered in new military, technological, and scientific developments in Pakistan and also provided data on radio-signal distribution in the ionosphere. Originally planned to be launched from the United States in 1986, the Challenger disaster delayed the launch of the satellite which changed the plan. After the People's Republic of China offered Pakistan to use its facility, the Badr-1 was finally launched from Xichang Satellite Launch Center in 1990 on Long March 2E. Badr-1 travelled at 17,500 miles per hour (28,200 km/h), taking 96.3 minutes to complete an orbit, and emitted radio signals at the 145 to 435 MHz bands which were operated by Pakistan Amateur Radio Society (PARS). The Badr-1 successfully completed its designed life, and a new satellite was proposed to be developed.

== Before the launch ==
The history of the Badr-1 project dated back to 1979, when Indian Space Research Organisation (ISRO) successfully launched their first satellite, Aryabhata, in 1975. After four years, on 13 December 1979, Munir Ahmad Khan managed a cabinet-level meeting with Chief Martial Law Administrator General Muhammad Zia-ul-Haq and gained SUPARCO's status as an executive authority. In 1981, Salim Mehmud addressed Munir Ahmad Khan proposing the development of an Earth-orbiting artificial satellite, the task previously achieved by India. Munir Ahmad Khan took the matter to General Zia-ul-Haq who gave approval of this project. As part of the development of this project, SUPARCO sent a number of its engineers to University of Surrey to participate in the development of UO-11 which was launched in 1984. After participating in various projects with University of Surrey, the team returned to Pakistan in 1986. Munir Ahmad Khan then returned to General Zia-ul-Haq and obtained his approval to begin practical work on Badr-1. The project was started by SUPARCO's Dr. Salim Mehmud as director of the project and was supported by the members of Pakistan Amateur Radio Society. The SUPARCO began building the satellite at the Instrumentation Laboratories (IL), with Dr. Muhammad Riaz Suddle serving as its project manager. This project was called "Project Badr" and was initially funded by the Ministry of Telecommunications and Ministry of Science. In short span of time first satellite of the project named Badr-1 was developed.

== Design ==
The technical director of Badr-1 was Dr. Salim Mehmud, Director of SUPARCO and the project was overseen by Dr. Muhammad Riaz Suddle, who served as its project manager. The satellite was slightly bigger than Soviet Sputnik 1 satellite in size. The Badr-1 was an indigenously built and developed satellite of Pakistan. The major contractor was Instrumentation Laboratories and the Pakistan Amateur Radio Society, supported by Ministry of Science and the Ministry of Telecommunications. The polyhedrons, covered with highly polished heat shield, made of aluminium-magnesium-titanium. The satellite carried two antennas designed by Instrumentation Laboratories. The power supply, with a mass of 52 kg. The satellite was powered with solar power panels with a 12.5 W electricity. The satellite was designed in SUPARCO's Satellite Research and Development Center in Lahore. The satellite had one radio channel for digital store-and-forward communications.

== Launch vehicle preparation and launch site selection ==
Badr-1 was launched through Long March 2E.

The SUPARCO negotiated with the National Aeronautics and Space Administration (NASA) for the launch of the satellite and approval required from the United States Government for the launch of the Badr-1. The Air Force Strategic Command decided to fly the satellite by using one of its C-130 aircraft in 1986 to Florida, United States. The Delta 3000 was selected by NASA's administration as its launch vehicle. Preparation was made and its crew and satellite was stored at the aircraft, however, it was delayed for unknown reasons. The Badr-1 was never shipped to United States and its launch was delayed for until next four years. As aftermath of the Challenger disaster in 1986, the United States Government and NASA had halt all the flights of the rockets carrying spacecraft and satellite payloads until the investigations were thoroughly completed. The satellite was stored at the Instrumentation Laboratories (IL) and SUPARCO began to negotiate with other space powers. In 1990, representatives of Chinese government offered Government of Pakistan to launch the satellite on one of its Long March Rockets and its facility. SUPARCO did not want to wait any longer, therefore, the satellite was flown to People's Republic of China in sub-assembled form. SUPARCO official's re-assembled the satellite at the Xichang Satellite Launch Center. The satellite was loaded at the Launch Area 2 and final preparations were made. The Chinese Government used Long March 2E, a three-stage orbital carrier rocket designed to commercial communications satellites, to launch the Badr-1 who also took its first maiden flight with the launch of Badr-1 on 16 July 1990.

== Launch and mission ==
On 16 July 1990, the Badr-1 was launched as a secondary payload on a Long March 2E rocket from Area No. 2 at XSLC. Scientists, engineers, technicians, and designers who developed the satellite watched the launch from range. They waited about 93 minutes to ensure that the satellite had made one orbit and was transmitting, before dr. M. Shafi Ahmad called Prime minister Benazir Bhutto. The downlink telemetry included data on temperatures inside and on the surface of the sphere. The satellite itself, a small but highly polished polyhedron, was barely visible at sixth magnitude, and thus more difficult to follow optically. The satellite completed its designated life successfully. On the first orbit, the SUPARCO globally announced the launch of the satellite, and the Science ministry confirmed the launch of the satellite. As the satellite completed its life, a new project was launched, more ambitious, advanced, and difficult than Badr-1. However, even after the Badr-1 was completed, the satellite could not be launched until 2001.

== Achievement ==
With the successful development and launch of the Badr-1, Pakistan became the first Muslim country, and second South Asian country after India, to place a satellite in orbit. The satellite gave Pakistani scientists an academic, scientific, and an amateur community experience in telemetry, tracking, control and data communications as the satellite successfully completed store and dump message tests for 5 weeks.

Despite the international success gained, the Pakistan's accomplishments were kept quiet in the homeland to prevent any exploitation of their failures or loss of secrets, which undermined the propaganda opportunity. The Pakistan Television, a state-controlled media authority, announced the first launch in televisions never made a headline, and only fewer details were projected. The Badr-1 crushed the global perception about the space program, and the space program was only dedicated to its military applications.

The satellite formed the derivatives and the basis of the Badr-B satellite.

== Technical configuration ==
| Structure | 26-Facet polyhedron |
| Thermal Design | passive |
| Mass | 52 kg |
| Solar Panels | 17 square facets |
| Average Conditioned Power | 12.5 watts |
| Down Link | VHF |
| Up Link | UHF |
| Telemetry Channels | 32 |
| Sensors | temperature, current, voltage |
| Data Transmission Rates | 1200,600,300,150 baud |
| DCE Memory Bank | 8 kilobyte |
| Launch Date | 16 July 1990 |
| Reentry Date | 9 December 1990 |

== See also ==
- Badr-B
- Badr (satellite)
- Space and Upper Atmosphere Research Commission
