= Manshuiwan railway station =

Railway station in Sichuan, China

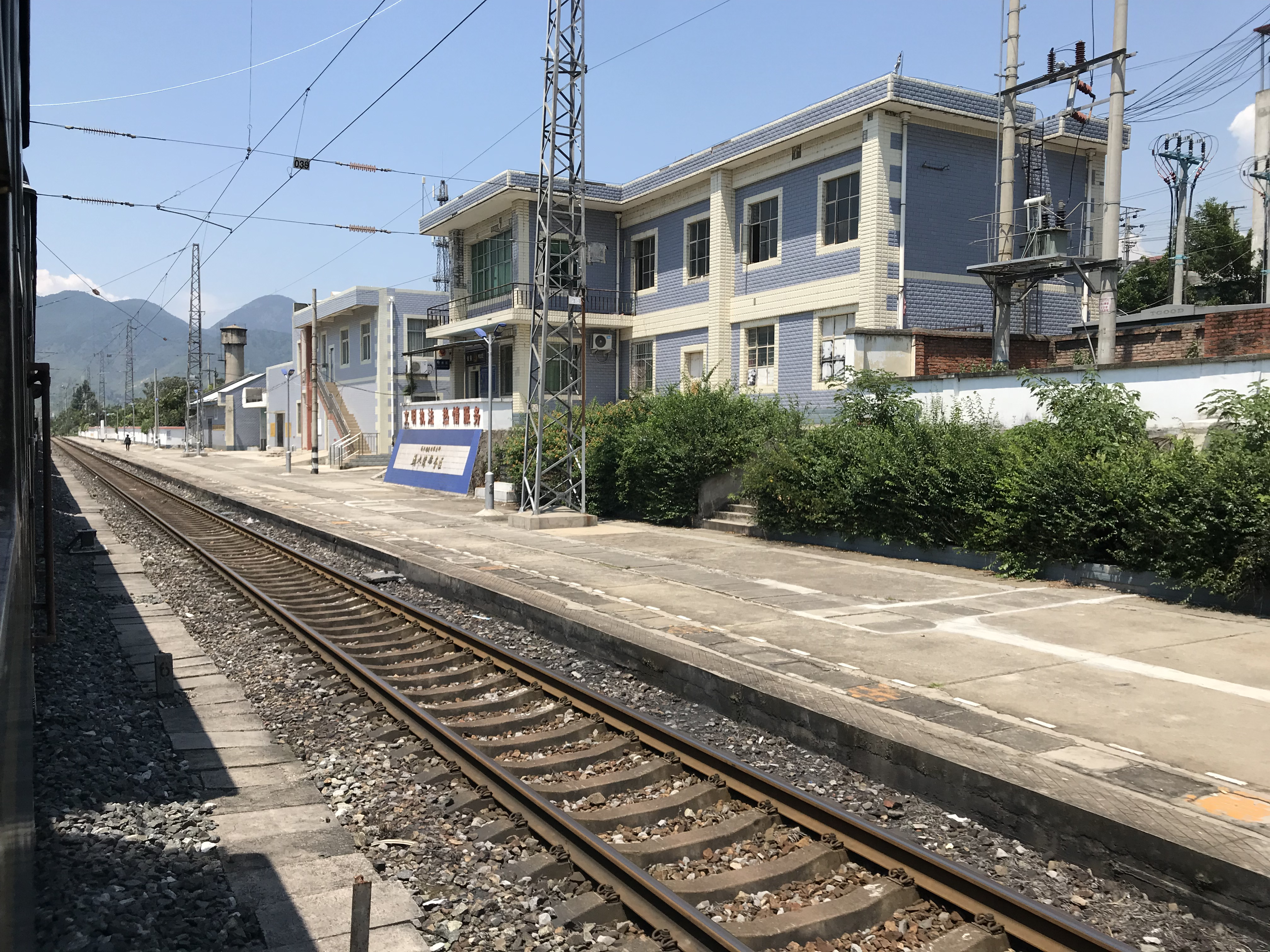
The Station Building of Manshuiwan.

Manshuiwan railway station (漫水湾站) is a railway station on the Chengkun railway, China.

The station is located in Mianning County, Sichuan province, initially built in 1970, managed by the Xichang branch of Chengdu Railway Bureau. It has a dedicated railway to Xichang Satellite Launch Center.
