= Long March 3B =

Chinese orbital carrier rocket

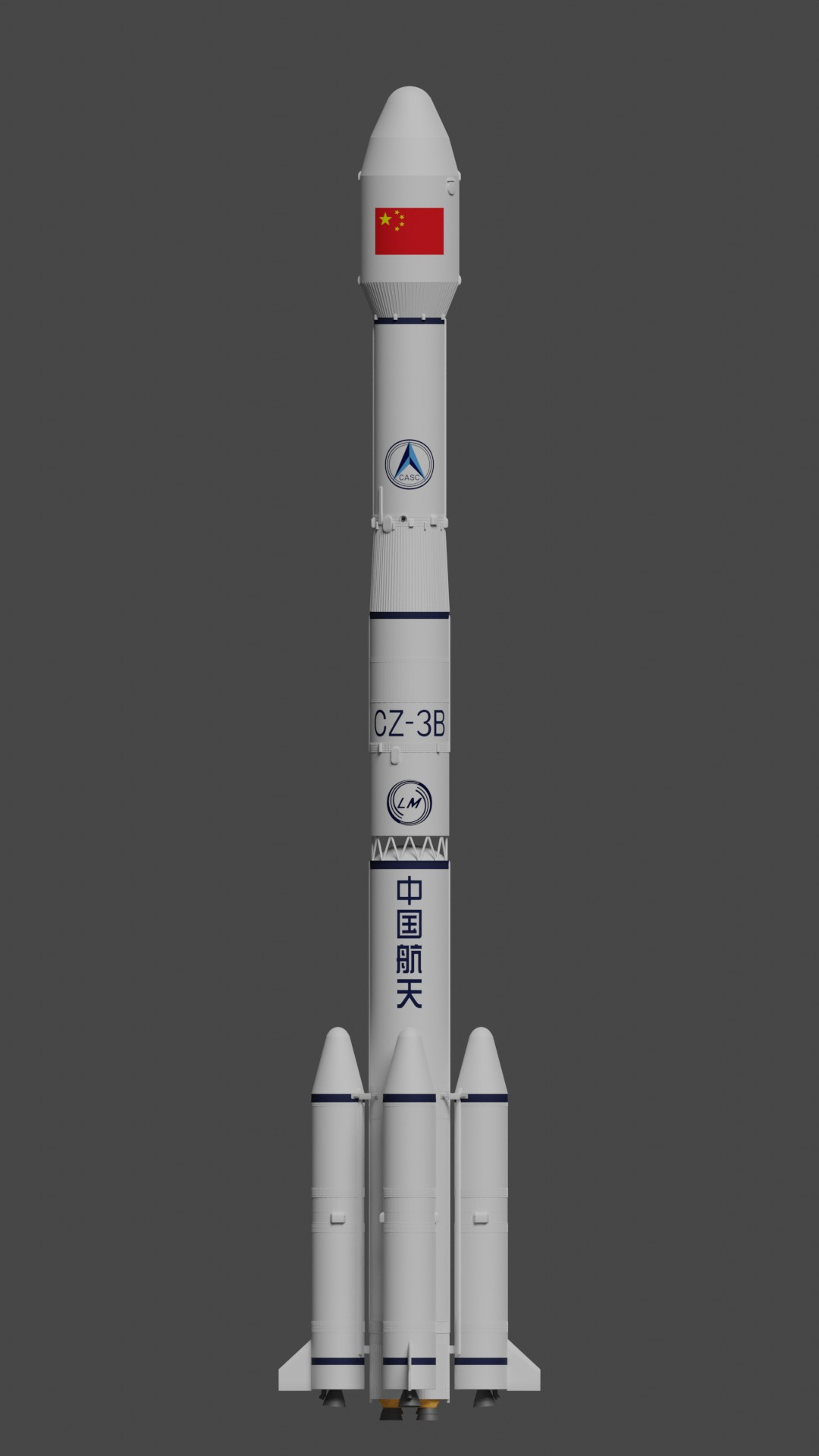
- Rendering of Long March 3B
- Function: Launch vehicle
- Manufacturer: China Academy of Launch Vehicle Technology (CALT)
- Country of origin: China
- Cost per launch: US$50-70 million

Size
- Height: 3B: 54.8 m (180 ft); 3B/E: 56.3 m (185 ft)
- Diameter: 3.35 m (11.0 ft)
- Mass: 3B: 425,800 kg (938,700 lb); 3B/E: 458,970 kg (1,011,860 lb)
- Stages: 3 / 4

Capacity

Payload to LEO
- Mass: 11,500 kg (25,400 lb)

Payload to SSO
- Mass: 7,100 kg (15,700 lb)

Payload to GTO
- Mass: 3B: 5,100 kg (11,200 lb); 3B/E: 5,500 kg (12,100 lb)

Payload to GEO
- Mass: 2,000 kg (4,400 lb)

Payload to HCO
- Mass: 3,300 kg (7,300 lb)

Associated rockets
- Family: Long March
- Derivative work: Long March 3C
- Comparable: Atlas V; Delta IV; Falcon 9 (reusable); LVM III; H-IIA; Zenit-3F

Launch history
- Status: 3B: Retired; 3B/E: Active
- Launch sites: Xichang LC-2, LC-3
- Total launches: 117; 3B: 12; 3B/E: 105
- Success(es): 112; 3B: 10; 3B/E: 102
- Failures: 3; 3B: 1 (Intelsat 708); 3B/E: 2 (Palapa-N1, Shijian-32)
- Partial failures: 2; 3B: 1 (Palapa-D); 3B/E: 1 (ChinaSat 9A)
- First flight: 3B: 14 February 1996 (Intelsat 708); 3B/E: 13 May 2007 (NigComSat-1)
- Last flight: 3B: 18 September 2012 (Compass M5, M6); 3B/E: 23 July 2026 (Tianlian II-06)
- Carries passengers or cargo: Chang'e 3, Chang'e 4, BeiDou, ChinaSat, Tianwen-2

Boosters (3B)
- No. boosters: 4
- Height: 15.33 m (50.3 ft)
- Diameter: 2.25 m (7 ft 5 in)
- Propellant mass: 37,700 kg (83,100 lb)
- Powered by: 1 × YF-25
- Maximum thrust: 740.4 kN (166,400 lb_{f})
- Specific impulse: 2,556.2 m/s (260.66 s)
- Burn time: 127 seconds
- Propellant: N_{2}O_{4} / UDMH

Boosters (3B/E)
- No. boosters: 4
- Height: 16.1 m (53 ft)
- Diameter: 2.25 m (7 ft 5 in)
- Propellant mass: 41,100 kg (90,600 lb)
- Powered by: 1 × YF-25
- Maximum thrust: 740.4 kN (166,400 lb_{f})
- Specific impulse: 2,556.2 m/s (260.66 s)
- Burn time: 140 seconds
- Propellant: N_{2}O_{4} / UDMH

First stage (3B)
- Height: 23.27 m (76.3 ft)
- Diameter: 3.35 m (11.0 ft)
- Propellant mass: 171,800 kg (378,800 lb)
- Powered by: 4 × YF-21C
- Maximum thrust: 2,961.6 kN (665,800 lb_{f})
- Specific impulse: 2,556.5 m/s (260.69 s)
- Burn time: 145 seconds
- Propellant: N_{2}O_{4} / UDMH

First stage (3B/E)
- Height: 24.76 m (81.2 ft)
- Diameter: 3.35 m (11.0 ft)
- Propellant mass: 186,200 kg (410,500 lb)
- Powered by: 4 × YF-21C
- Maximum thrust: 2,961.6 kN (665,800 lb_{f})
- Specific impulse: 2,556.5 m/s (260.69 s)
- Burn time: 158 seconds
- Propellant: N_{2}O_{4} / UDMH

Second stage
- Height: 12.92 m (42.4 ft)
- Diameter: 3.35 m (11.0 ft)
- Propellant mass: 49,400 kg (108,900 lb)
- Powered by: 1 × YF-24E; YF-22E (Main); YF-23F (Vernier)
- Maximum thrust: 742 kN (167,000 lb_{f}) (Main); 47.1 kN (10,600 lb_{f}) (Vernier)
- Specific impulse: 2,922.57 m/s (9,588.5 ft/s) (Main); 2,910.5 m/s (9,549 ft/s) (Vernier)
- Burn time: 185 seconds
- Propellant: N_{2}O_{4} / UDMH

Third stage
- Height: 12.38 m (40.6 ft)
- Diameter: 3.0 m (9.8 ft)
- Propellant mass: 18,200 kg (40,100 lb)
- Powered by: 2 × YF-75
- Maximum thrust: 167.17 kN (37,580 lb_{f})
- Specific impulse: 4,295 m/s (438.0 s)
- Burn time: 478 seconds
- Propellant: LH_{2} / LOX

Fourth stage (optional) – YZ-1
- Powered by: 1 × YF-50D
- Maximum thrust: 6.5 kN (1,500 lb_{f})
- Specific impulse: 315.5 s (3.094 km/s)
- Propellant: N_{2}O_{4} / UDMH

The Long March 3B (Chinese: 长征三号乙; pinyin: Chángzhēng sānhàoyǐ), also known as the CZ-3B and LM-3B, is a Chinese orbital launch vehicle. Introduced in 1996, it is launched from Launch Area 2 and 3 at the Xichang Satellite Launch Center in Sichuan. A three-stage rocket with four strap-on liquid rocket boosters, it is the heaviest variant of the Long March 3 rocket family, and is mainly used to place communications satellites and navigation satellites into geosynchronous orbits.

An enhanced version, the Long March 3B/E or G2, was introduced in 2007 to increase the rocket's geostationary transfer orbit (GTO) cargo capacity and lift heavier geosynchronous orbit (GEO) communications satellites. The Long March 3B also served as the basis for the medium-capacity Long March 3C, which was first launched in 2008.

As of 26 December 2025, the Long March 3B, 3B/E and 3B/G5 have conducted 110 successful launches, plus 2 failures and 2 partial failures, accumulating a success rate of 96.5%. It is the first Long March series rocket to accumulate 100 orbital launches.

== History ==
The development of the Long March 3B began in 1986 to meet the needs of the international GEO communications satellite market. During its maiden flight, on 14 February 1996 carrying the Intelsat 708 satellite, the rocket suffered a guidance failure two seconds into the flight and destroyed a nearby town, killing at least six people, but outside estimates suggest that anywhere between 200 and 500 people might have been killed. However, the author of the report later ruled out large casualties, because evidence suggest that the crash site was evacuated before the launch.

The Long March 3B and 3B/E rockets conducted ten successful launches between 1997 and 2008.

In 1997, the Agila 2 satellite was forced to use onboard propellant to reach its correct orbit because of poor injection accuracy on the part of its Long March 3B launch vehicle. In 2009, a Long March 3B partially failed during launch due to a third stage anomaly, which resulted in the Palapa-D satellite reaching a lower orbit than planned. Nonetheless, the satellite was able to maneuver itself into the planned orbit. The Long March 3B and its variants remain in active use as of January 2021, having conducted a total of 26 consecutive successful launches, since 19 June 2017 until 9 March 2020.

In December 2013, a Long March 3B/E successfully lifted Chang'e 3, China's first Lunar lander and rover into the projected lunar-transfer orbit.

In April 2020, the third stage of the Long March 3B/E failed during a Palapa-N1 communications satellite mission; this was the first total failure of the Long March 3B/E.

== Design and variants ==
The Long March 3B is based on the Long March 3A as its core stage, with four liquid boosters strapped on the first stage. It has a low Earth orbit (LEO) cargo capacity of 11,200 kg (24,700 lb) and a GTO capacity is 5,100 kg (11,200 lb).

=== Long March 3B/E ===
The Long March 3B/E, also known as 3B/G2, is an enhanced variant of the Long March 3B, featuring an enlarged (taller) first stage and boosters, increasing its GTO payload capacity to 5,500 kg (12,100 lb). Its maiden flight took place on 13 May 2007, when it successfully launched Nigeria's NigComSat-1, the first African geosynchronous communications satellite. In 2013, it successfully launched China's first lunar lander Chang'e 3 and lunar rover Yutu.

Since 2015, the Long March 3B and 3C can optionally accommodate a YZ-1 upper stage, which has been used to carry dual launches or BeiDou navigation satellites into medium Earth orbit (MEO).

=== Long March 3C ===
A modified version of the Long March 3B, the Long March 3C, was developed in the mid-1990s to bridge the gap in payload capacity between the Long March 3B and 3A. It is almost identical to the Long March 3B, but has two boosters instead of four, giving it a reduced GTO payload capacity of 3,800 kg (8,400 lb). Its maiden launch took place on 25 April 2008.

== Launch statistics ==
Just for LM-3 and 3B/E (excludes LM-3C).

- Failure
- Partial failure
- Success
- Planned

== List of launches ==
Flight number	Serial number	Date (UTC)	Launch site	Version	Payload	Orbit	Result
1	Y1	14 February 1996; 19:01	XSLC, LA-2	3B	Intelsat 708	GTO	Failure
2	Y2	19 August 1997; 17:50	XSLC, LA-2	3B	Agila-2	GTO	Success
3	Y3	16 October 1997; 19:13	XSLC, LA-2	3B	APStar 2R	GTO	Success
4	Y5	30 May 1998; 10:00	XSLC, LA-2	3B	Chinastar 1	GTO	Success
5	Y4	18 July 1998; 09:20	XSLC, LA-2	3B	SinoSat 1	GTO	Success
6	Y6	12 April 2005; 12:00	XSLC, LA-2	3B	APStar 6	GTO	Success
7	Y7	28 October 2006; 16:20	XSLC, LA-2	3B	SinoSat 2	GTO	Success
8	Y9	13 May 2007; 16:01	XSLC, LA-2	3B/E	NigComSat-1	GTO	Success
9	Y10	5 July 2007; 12:08	XSLC, LA-2	3B	ChinaSat 6B	GTO	Success
10	Y11	9 June 2008; 12:15	XSLC, LA-2	3B	ChinaSat 9	GTO	Success
11	Y12	29 October 2008; 16:53	XSLC, LA-2	3B/E	Venesat-1	GTO	Success
12	Y8	31 August 2009; 09:28	XSLC, LA-2	3B	Palapa-D	GTO	Partial Failure
13	Y13	4 September 2010; 16:14	XSLC, LA-2	3B/E	SinoSat 6	GTO	Success
14	Y20	20 June 2011; 16:13	XSLC, LA-2	3B/E	ChinaSat 10	GTO	Success
15	Y19	11 August 2011; 16:15	XSLC, LA-2	3B/E	Paksat-1R	GTO	Success
16	Y16	18 September 2011; 16:33	XSLC, LA-2	3B/E	ChinaSat 1A	GTO	Success
17	Y18	7 October 2011; 08:21	XSLC, LA-2	3B/E	Eutelsat W3C	GTO	Success
18	Y21	19 December 2011; 16:41	XSLC, LA-2	3B/E	NigComSat-1R	GTO	Success
19	Y22	31 March 2012; 10:27	XSLC, LA-2	3B/E	APStar 7	GTO	Success
20	Y14	29 April 2012; 20:50	XSLC, LA-2	3B	Compass-M3; Compass-M4	MEO	Success
21	Y17	26 May 2012; 15:56	XSLC, LA-2	3B/E	ChinaSat 2A	GTO	Success
22	Y15	18 September 2012; 19:10	XSLC, LA-2	3B	Compass-M5; Compass-M6	MEO	Success
23	Y24	27 November 2012; 10:13	XSLC, LA-2	3B/E	ChinaSat 12	GTO	Success
24	Y25	1 May 2013; 16:06	XSLC, LA-2	3B/E	ChinaSat 11	GTO	Success
25	Y23	1 December 2013; 17:30	XSLC, LA-2	3B/E	Chang'e 3	TLI	Success
26	Y27	20 December 2013; 16:42	XSLC, LA-2	3B/E	Túpac Katari 1	GTO	Success
27	Y26	25 July 2015; 12:29	XSLC, LA-2	3B/E + YZ-1	BeiDou M1-S; BeiDou M2-S	MEO	Success
28	Y32	12 September 2015; 15:42	XSLC, LA-2	3B/E	TJS-1	GTO	Success
29	Y33	29 September 2015; 23:13	XSLC, LA-3	3B/E	BeiDou I2-S	GTO	Success
30	Y36	16 October 2015; 16:16	XSLC, LA-2	3B/E	APStar 9	GTO	Success
31	Y34	3 November 2015; 16:25	XSLC, LA-3	3B/E	ChinaSat 2C	GTO	Success
32	Y38	20 November 2015; 16:07	XSLC, LA-2	3B/E	LaoSat-1	GTO	Success
33	Y31	9 December 2015; 16:46	XSLC, LA-3	3B/E	ChinaSat 1C	GTO	Success
34	Y37	28 December 2015; 16:04	XSLC, LA-2	3B/E	Gaofen 4	GTO	Success
35	Y29	15 January 2016; 16:57	XSLC, LA-3	3B/E	Belintersat-1	GTO	Success
36	Y35	5 August 2016; 16:22	XSLC, LA-3	3B/E	Tiantong 1-01	GTO	Success
37	Y42	10 December 2016; 16:11	XSLC, LA-3	3B/E	Fengyun-4A	GTO	Success
38	Y39	5 January 2017; 15:18	XSLC, LA-2	3B/E	TJS-2	GTO	Success
39	Y43	12 April 2017; 11:04	XSLC, LA-2	3B/E	Shijian 13	GTO	Success
40	Y28	19 June 2017; 16:11	XSLC, LA-2	3B/E	Chinasat 9A	GTO	Partial failure
41	Y46	5 November 2017; 11:45	XSLC, LA-2	3B/E + YZ-1	BeiDou-3 M1; BeiDou-3 M2	MEO	Success
42	Y40	10 December 2017; 16:40	XSLC, LA-2	3B/E	Alcomsat-1	GTO	Success
43	Y45	11 January 2018; 23:18	XSLC, LA-2	3B/E + YZ-1	BeiDou-3 M7; BeiDou-3 M8	MEO	Success
44	Y47	12 February 2018; 05:03	XSLC, LA-2	3B/E + YZ-1	BeiDou-3 M3; BeiDou-3 M4	MEO	Success
45	Y48	29 March 2018; 17:56	XSLC, LA-2	3B/E + YZ-1	BeiDou-3 M9; BeiDou-3 M10	MEO	Success
46	Y55	3 May 2018; 16:06	XSLC, LA-2	3B/E	Apstar 6C	GTO	Success
47	Y49	29 July 2018; 01:48	XSLC, LA-3	3B/E + YZ-1	BeiDou-3 M5; BeiDou-3 M6	MEO	Success
48	Y50	24 August 2018; 23:52	XSLC, LA-3	3B/E + YZ-1	BeiDou-3 M11; BeiDou-3 M12	MEO	Success
49	Y51	19 September 2018; 14:07	XSLC, LA-3	3B/E + YZ-1	BeiDou-3 M13; BeiDou-3 M14	MEO	Success
50	Y52	15 October 2018; 04:23	XSLC, LA-3	3B/E + YZ-1	BeiDou-3 M15; BeiDou-3 M16	MEO	Success
51	Y41	1 November 2018; 15:57	XSLC, LA-2	3B/E	BeiDou-3 G1	GTO	Success
52	Y53	18 November 2018; 18:07	XSLC, LA-3	3B/E + YZ-1	BeiDou-3 M17; BeiDou-3 M18	MEO	Success
53	Y30	7 December 2018; 18:23	XSLC, LA-2	3B/E	Chang'e 4	TLI	Success
54	Y56	10 January 2019; 17:11	XSLC, LA-2	3B/E	ChinaSat 2D	GTO	Success
55	Y54	9 March 2019; 16:28	XSLC, LA-3	3B/E	ChinaSat 6C	GTO	Success
56	Y44	31 March 2019; 15:51	XSLC, LA-2	3B/E	Tianlian II-01	GTO	Success
57	Y59	20 April 2019; 14:41	XSLC, LA-3	3B/E	BeiDou-3 I1	GTO	Success
58	Y60	24 June 2019; 18:09	XSLC, LA-3	3B/E	BeiDou-3 I2	GTO	Success
59	Y58	19 August 2019; 12:03	XSLC, LA-2	3B/E	ChinaSat 18	GTO	Success
60	Y65	22 September 2019; 21:10	XSLC, LA-2	3B/E + YZ-1	BeiDou-3 M23; BeiDou-3 M24	MEO	Success
61	Y57	17 October 2019; 15:21	XSLC, LA-3	3B/E	TJS-4	GTO	Success
62	Y61	4 November 2019; 17:43	XSLC, LA-2	3B/E	BeiDou-3 I3	GTO	Success
63	Y66	23 November 2019; 00:55	XSLC, LA-3	3B/E + YZ-1	BeiDou-3 M21; BeiDou-3 M22	MEO	Success
64	Y67	16 December 2019; 07:22	XSLC, LA-3	3B/E + YZ-1	BeiDou-3 M19; BeiDou-3 M20	MEO	Success
65	Y62	7 January 2020; 15:20	XSLC, LA-2	3B/E	TJS-5	GTO	Success
66	Y69	9 March 2020; 11:55	XSLC, LA-2	3B/E	BeiDou-3 G2	GTO	Success
67	Y71	9 April 2020; 11:46	XSLC, LA-2	3B/E	Palapa-N1 (Nusantara Dua)	GTO	Failure
68	Y68	23 June 2020; 01:43	XSLC, LA-2	3B/E	BeiDou-3 G3	GTO	Success
69	Y64	9 July 2020; 12:11	XSLC, LA-2	3B/E	Apstar 6D	GTO	Success
70	Y63	11 October 2020; 16:57	XSLC, LA-2	3B/E	Gaofen-13	GTO	Success
71	Y73	12 November 2020; 15:59	XSLC, LA-2	3B/E	Tiantong 1-02	GTO	Success
72	Y70	6 December 2020; 03:58	XSLC, LA-3	3B/E	Gaofen-14	SSO	Success
73	Y74	19 January 2021; 16:25	XSLC, LA-2	3B/E	Tiantong 1-03	GTO	Success
74	Y77	4 February 2021; 15:36	XSLC, LA-3	3B/E	TJS-6	GTO	Success
75	Y72	2 June 2021; 16:17	XSLC, LA-2	3B/E	Fengyun 4B	GTO	Success
76	Y76	5 August 2021; 16:30	XSLC, LA-2	3B/E	ChinaSat 2E	GTO	Success
77	Y78	24 August 2021; 15:41	XSLC, LA-3	3B/E	TJS-7	GTO	Success
78	Y86	9 September 2021; 11:50	XSLC, LA-2	3B/E	ChinaSat 9B	GTO	Success
79	Y81	27 September 2021; 08:20	XSLC, LA-2	3B/E	Shiyan 10	GTO	Success
80	Y83	24 October 2021; 01:27:03	XSLC, LA-2	3B/E	Shijian-21	GTO	Success
81	Y79	26 November 2021; 16:40:04	XSLC, LA-2	3B/E	ChinaSat 1D	GTO	Success
82	Y82	13 December 2021; 16:09	XSLC, LA-3	3B/E	Tianlian II-02	GTO	Success
83	Y84	29 December 2021; 16:43	XSLC, LA-2	3B/E	TJS-9	GTO	Success
84	Y89	15 April 2022; 12:00	XSLC, LA-2	3B/E	ChinaSat 6D	GTO	Success
85	Y85	12 July 2022; 16:30	XSLC, LA-2	3B/E	Tianlian II-03	GTO	Success
86	Y91	5 November 2022; 11:50	XSLC, LA-2	3B/E	ChinaSat 19	GTO	Success
87	Y88	29 December 2022; 04:43	XSLC, LA-2	3B/E	Shiyan 10-02	GTO	Success
88	Y93	23 February 2023; 11:49	XSLC, LA-2	3B/E	ChinaSat 26	GTO	Success
89	Y90	17 March 2023; 08:33	XSLC, LA-2	3B/E	Gaofen 13-02	GTO	Success
90	Y87	17 May 2023; 02:49	XSLC, LA-2	3B/E	BeiDou-3 G4	GTO	Success
91	Y92	12 August 2023; 17:26	XSLC, LA-2	3B/E	Ludi Tance-4 01A	GTO	Success
92	Y94	9 November 2023; 11:23	XSLC, LA-2	3B/E	ChinaSat 6E	GTO	Success
93	Y75	26 December 2023; 03:26	XSLC, LA-2	3B/E + YZ-1	BeiDou-3 M26; BeiDou-3 M28	MEO	Success
94	Y95	29 February 2024; 13:03	XSLC, LA-2	3B/E	Weixing Hulianwang Gaogui-01	GTO	Success
95	Y96	9 May 2024; 01:43	XSLC, LA-2	3B/E	Zhihui Tianwang 1-01A; Zhihui Tianwang 1-01B	MEO	Success
96	Y98	30 May 2024; 12:12	XSLC, LA-2	3B/E	Paksat-MM1R	GTO	Success
97	Y97	1 August 2024; 13:14	XSLC, LA-2	3B/E	Weixing Hulianwang Gaogui-02	GTO	Success
98	Y80	19 September 2024; 01:14	XSLC, LA-2	3B/E + YZ-1	BeiDou-3 M25; BeiDou-3 M27	MEO	Success
99	Y100	10 October 2024; 13:50	XSLC, LA-2	3B/E	Weixing Hulianwang Gaogui-03	GTO	Success
100	Y103	3 December 2024; 05:56	XSLC, LA-3	3B/E	TJS-13	GTO	Success
101	Y99	20 December 2024; 15:12	XSLC, LA-2	3B/E	TJS-12	GTO	Success
102	Y104	6 January 2025; 20:00	XSLC, LA-3	3B/E	Shijian-25	GTO	Success
103	Y105	23 January 2025; 15:32	XSLC, LA-2	3B/E	TJS-14	GTO	Success
104	Y101	22 February 2025; 12:11	XSLC, LA-2	3B/E	ChinaSat 10R	GTO	Success
105	Y102	9 March 2025; 17:17	XSLC, LA-3	3B/E	TJS-15	GTO	Success
106	Y108	26 March 2025; 15:55	XSLC, LA-2	3B/E	Tianlian II-04	GTO	Success
107	Y107	10 April 2025; 16:47	XSLC, LA-3	3B/E	TJS-17	GTO	Success
108	Y109	27 April 2025; 15:54	XSLC, LA-2	3B/E	Tianlian II-05	GTO	Success
109	Y110	28 May 2025; 17:31	XSLC, LA-2	3B/E	Tianwen-2	Heliocentric	Success
110	Y111	20 June 2025; 12:37	XSLC, LA-2	3B/E	ChinaSat 9C	GTO	Success
111	Y?	26 October 2025; 03:55	XSLC, LA-3	3B/E	Gaofen-14 02	SSO	Success
112	Y?	21 November 2025; 10:55	XSLC, LA-2	3B/E	TJS-21	Molniya	Success
113	Y?	9 December 2025; 15:08	XSLC, LA-3	3B/E	TJS-22	GTO	Success
114	Y?	26 December 2025; 16:07	XSLC, LA-2	3B/E	Fengyun 4C	GTO	Success
115	Y?	16 January 2026; 16:55	XSLC, LA-2	3B/E	Shijian-32	GTO	Failure
116	Y?	16 June 2026; 09:45	XSLC, LA-2	3B/E	Shijian-31	GTO	Success
117	Y?	23 July 2026; 12:00	XSLC, LA-2	3B/E	Tianlian II-06	GTO	Success
	Y?	2027	XSLC, LA-2	3B/E	ChinaSat 27	GTO	Planned

=== Notable payloads ===
- Intelsat 708
- Beidou
- Chang'e 3
- Chang'e 4
- Tianwen-2
- Eutelsat W3C
- TJS-5
- Apstar 6C
- Chinasat 9A
- Chinasat 6C
- Palapa-D
- Fengyun 4B
- NigComSat-1
- Tiantong 1–03
- Gaofen 14

== Flight mishaps and anomalies ==
=== Intelsat 708 launch failure ===
On 14 February 1996, the launch of the first Long March 3B with Intelsat 708 failed just after liftoff when the launch vehicle veered off course and exploded when it hit the ground at T+23 seconds.

The Xinhua news agency reported that six people were killed and 57 injured. However, the Americans on hand for the launch have testified that "dozens, if not hundreds", of people were seen to gather outside the centre's main gate near the crash site the night before launch. When reporters were being taken away from the site, they found that most buildings had sustained serious damage or had been flattened completely. Other eyewitnesses were noted as having seen dozens of ambulances and many flatbed trucks, loaded with what could have been human remains, being taken to the local hospital.

The cause of the accident was traced to short-circuiting of the vehicle's guidance platform at liftoff.

The participation of Space Systems/Loral in the accident investigation caused great political controversy in the United States. In 1997, the U.S. Defense Technology Security Administration found that China had obtained "significant benefit" from the Review Committee, results of which would improve their "launch vehicles ... ballistic missiles and in particular their guidance systems".

As a result, the U.S. Congress reclassified satellite technology as a munition and placed it back under the restrictive International Traffic in Arms Regulations in 1998. No license to launch United States spacecraft on Chinese rockets has been approved by the U.S. State Department since then, and an official at the Bureau of Industry and Security emphasized in 2016 that "no U.S.-origin content, regardless of significance, regardless of whether it's incorporated into a foreign-made item, can go to China".

=== Palapa-D partial launch failure ===
On 31 August 2009, during the launch of Palapa-D, the third stage engine under-performed and placed the satellite into a lower than planned orbit. The satellite was able to make up the performance shortfall using its own engine and reach geosynchronous orbit, but with its lifetime shortened to 10.5 years from the originally projected 15–16 years. The investigation found that the failure was due to burn-through of the engine's gas generator, and that "the most likely cause of the burn-through was a foreign matter or humidity-caused icing in the engine's liquid-hydrogen injectors".

=== ChinaSat-9A partial launch failure ===
On 19 June 2017, a Long March 3B/E mission carrying ChinaSat-9A ended in partial failure. Officials did not release details regarding the status of the mission for at least 4 hours after liftoff. Two weeks later, on 7 July 2017, officials confirmed that the mission had been anomalous, with Space Daily reporting that "an anomaly was found on the carrier rocket's rolling control thruster, part of the attitude control engine, during the third gliding phase". The failure in the rocket's third stage left the payload in a lower than intended orbit, and the payload was forced to spend two weeks reaching its intended orbit under its own power.

=== Palapa-N1 (Nusantara Dua) launch failure ===
On 9 April 2020, a Long March 3B launcher failed after lifting off from the Xichang Satellite Launch Center in the southwestern Sichuan province at 11:46 UTC during the launch of an Indonesian communications satellite, Palapa-N1 (Nusantara Dua) of a mass of 5500 kg and was expected to enter service in geostationary orbit at 113.0° East, replacing the Palapa-D satellite. But one of the two YF-75 third stage engines failed to ignite, preventing the Palapa-N1 (Nusantara Dua) satellite from reaching orbit. Wreckage from the third stage and the Palapa-N1 spacecraft re-entered the atmosphere, leading to sightings of fiery debris in the skies over Guam. With the Long March 3B failure, Chinese rockets have faltered on two missions in less than a month. A Long March 7A rocket failed to place a satellite in orbit on 16 March 2020 after taking off from the Wenchang Spacecraft Launch Site on Hainan Island, located in southern China. After two Chinese launch failures in less than a month, further Chinese launches will be likely delayed until it is sure that the quality control is satisfactory.

== Rocket debris ==
Debris from Long March 3B launches have fallen on nearby villages due to the inland location of China's launch sites. Grid fins for guiding boosters down to Earth more accurately have been tested on Long March 2C and 4B, but not yet on 3B.

== See also ==
- List of Long March launches (2025-2029)
