= SupremeSAT =

Sri Lankan satellite operator

Logo of SupremeSAT

SupremeSAT (Pvt) Ltd. is a Sri Lankan satellite operator. It is a wholly owned subsidiary of Supreme Global holdings. It's had a partnership with satellite manufacturer China Great Wall Industry Corporation (CGWIC) since 2013. The company is controversial for its ties with the Rajapaksa family of Sri Lanka.

SupremeSAT deployed the first Sri Lankan satellite, Supreme SAT-I on November 12, 2012, launched on Long March 3B from Xichang, China. Supreme SAT-I is jointly owned by China's CGWIC and Supreme Global Holdings. SupremeSAT became the 27th private company in the world to own a satellite.

== Satellite fleet ==
SupremeSAT Satellites
Satellite	Location	Launched	Type	Notes
ChinaSat 12	87.5°E	November 27, 2012	SB4000C2	Manufacturer: Thales Alenia Space
SupremeSAT-II	98°E	Planned mid 2018	DFH-4	Manufacturer: China Academy Of Space Technology (CAST). Satellite will have KU band.
SupremeSAT-III	50°E	?	-	Planned to shift the businesses from SupremeSAT-I & SupremeSAT-II to SupremeSAT-III.

== Controversies ==
There are numerous allegations that the funding came from the Sri Lankan government and the funds were mishandled. President Mahinda Rajapaksa's son Rohitha Rajapaksa played a key role in the project and is believed to have business links. SupremeSAT denies these allegations
