= Tongxin Jishu Shiyan =

Chinese satellite program

TJS (Satellite)
- 通信技术试验; Tōngxìn Jìshù Shìyàn

Program overview
- Country: People's Republic of China
- Organization: SAST; CAST
- Purpose: Rendezvous & Inspection (RPO), Missile warning, SIGINT
- Status: Active

Program history
- Duration: 2015–Present
- First flight: 12 September 2015
- Last flight: 23 October 2025
- Successes: 20
- Failures: 0
- Launch site(s): Xichang Satellite Launch Center; Wenchang Space Launch Site

TJS, Chinese: 通信技术试验; pinyin: Tōngxìn Jìshù Shìyàn; lit. 'communication technology test') is a Chinese military satellite program operating in geostationary orbit (GEO). TJS satellites are manufactured by the Shanghai Academy of Spaceflight Technology (SAST) and launched from Xichang Satellite Launch Center (XSLC) in China's southern Sichuan Province. TJS is likely the cover name for multiple geostationary military satellite programs and should not be confused with the similarly named Shiyan satellite program.

Unlike traditional, non-military satellites where the Chinese government announces the satellite's name, mission, platform, launch vehicle, and launch site in advance, with TJS satellites the Chinese government announces airspace closures the day before and makes vague statements on the satellite's purpose after the launch.

Although the true purpose of TJS satellites remains classified, satellite observers speculate these satellites provide early warning and signals intelligence (SIGINT) for the Chinese People's Liberation Army (PLA).

== Classes ==
Satellites under the Tongxin Jishu Shiyan cover appear to compose three separate classes, all in geostationary orbit and performing a military or intelligence mission. These include the purported Qianshao-3 SIGINT class, the Huoyan-1 early warning class, and an unknown class for TJS-3 and its subsatellite.

=== Qianshao-3 ===
TJS-1, TJS-4, and TJS-9 satellites, launched in 2015, 2019, and 2021, maintain geostationary orbit over the Indian Ocean and Micronesia and are suspected to comprise the Qianshao-3 SIGINT satellite class (Chinese: 前哨; pinyin: Qiánshào; lit. 'Outpost'). The Chinese government originally stated these satellites were designed to test Ka-band broadband communication (27–40 GHz) but has not commented on the satellites since they achieved geostationary orbit. In January 2017, novel reports of an antenna approximately 32 meters wide reinforced speculation of the satellite's potential SIGINT mission. Other Chinese sources suggest the Qianshao series are space-based infrared early warning satellites.

=== Huoyan-1 ===
TJS-2, TJS-5, TJS-6 and TJS-7 satellites are, according to official Chinese statements "new generation high capacity experimental communications and broadcasting satellites" testing "high speed and multi-frequency wide-band data transfer." Launched in 2017, 2020, and 2021, these satellites are rumored to be of the Huoyan-1 (Chinese: 火眼; pinyin: Huǒyǎn; lit. 'Fire Eyes') program — China's first early-warning satellites in geosynchronous orbit. Placeholder images used in the launch video depicts the satellites as being roughly analogus to the Space Based Infrared System (SBIRS) of the United States. These purported Huoyan-1 series satellites remain fixed in orbit over the Indian Ocean, South China Sea, and Oceania. James Acton, co-director of the Nuclear Policy Program at the Carnegie Endowment for International Peace believes these satellites primary purpose is for missile warning based on their orbital slots and inclinations.

=== TJS-3 satellites ===
The third satellite of the Tongxin Jishu Shiyan program, TJS-3, is still largely shrouded in secrecy with observers unable to determine if the satellite performs an early warning or signals intelligence mission. Said to have only had one payload aboard during its 2018 launch, observers detected a secondary object separate from TJS-3 in orbit. The object was originally labeled by the United States Space Force as an apogee kick motor (AKM), a final-impulse motor often discarded by satellites entering their terminal geostationary orbit. The secondary object drew public intrigue when, on January 4 and January 11, 2019 (weeks after launch), the secondary object performed station-keeping maneuvers to maintain a synchronized orbit with the main TJS-3 satellite, uncharacteristic of a discarded AKM. Reinforcing suspicions, on Friday, 18 January 2019, the subsatellite maneuvered eastward over Southeast Asia with the main TJS-3 satellite performing the same maneuver two days later. The two satellites continued to complete a number of synchronized maneuvers.

Later in May 2019, capitalizing on the passing of the day-night terminator which makes satellite tracking by optical telescope impractical, the TJS-3 maneuvered far out of its orbit with its subsatellite taking its place shortly after. According to Jim Cooper, lead for space situational awareness for the space-tracking company COMSPOC, TJS-3 and its subsatellite were likely developing and validating tactics, techniques, and procedures (TTPs) for spoofing other nation's space situational awareness efforts which would mistake the subsatellite for its parent while the latter could "be off doing things that are potentially threatening". China has yet to acknowledge any secondary object associated with the TJS-3.

== Satellites ==
TJS Satellite Series List
No.	Satellite	Program	Function	Manufacturer	Launch Date	COSPAR ID	SCN	Orbit	Launch site	Launcher	Status
1	TJS-1	Qianshao-3 1	SIGINT	CAST	2015-09-12	2015-046A	40892	GEO	XSLC	Long March 3B	Operational
2	TJS-2	Huoyan-1 01	Missile warning	SAST	2017-01-05	2017-001A	41911	GEO	XSLC	Long March 3B	Operational
3	TJS-3	Unknown	Missile warning	SAST	2018-12-25	2018-110A	43874	GEO	XSLC	Long March 3C	Operational
	TJS-3 (subsatellite)	Unknown	Unknown	SAST	2018-12-25	2018-110C	43917	GEO	XSLC	Long March 3C	Operational
4	TJS-4	Qianshao-3 2	SIGINT	CAST	2019-10-17	2019-070A	44637	GEO	XSLC	Long March 3B	Operational
5	TJS-5	Huoyan-1 02	Missile warning	SAST	2020-01-07	2020-002A	44978	GEO	XSLC	Long March 3B	Operational
6	TJS-6	Huoyan-1 03	Missile warning	SAST	2021-02-04	2021-010A	47613	GEO	XSLC	Long March 3B	Operational
7	TJS-7	Unknown	Technology demonstration	SAST	2021-08-24	2021-077A	49115	GEO	XSLC	Long March 3B	Operational
8	Shiyan 10 01	Unknown	Missile warning	SAST	2021-09-27	2021-087A	49258	Molniya	XSLC	Long March 3B	Operational
9	TJS-9	Qianshao-3 3	SIGINT	CAST	2021-12-30	2021-135A	50574	GEO	XSLC	Long March 3B	Operational
10	Shiyan 10-02	Unknown	Missile warning	SAST	2022-12-29	2022-178A	54878	Molniya	XSLC	Long March 3B	Operational
11	TJS-10	Unknown	Technology demonstration	SAST	2023-11-03	2023-169A	58204	GEO	WSLS	Long March 7A	Operational
12	TJS-11	Unknown	SIGINT	CAST	2024-02-23	2024-037A	59020	GEO	WSLS	Long March 5	Operational
13	TJS-13	Huoyan-1 04	Missile warning	SAST	2024-12-03	2024-227A	62188	Molniya	XSLC	Long March 3B	Operational
14	TJS-12	Qianshao-3 4	SIGINT	SAST	2024-12-20	2024-246A	62374	GEO	XSLC	Long March 3B	Operational
15	TJS-14	Unknown	Technology demonstration	SAST	2025-01-23	2025-017A	62804	GEO	XSLC	Long March 3B	Operational
16	TJS-15	Unknown	Technology demonstration	SAST	2025-03-10	2025-045A	63157	GEO	XSLC	Long March 3B	Operational
17	TJS-16	Unknown	Technology demonstration	SAST	2025-03-29	2025-064A	63397	GEO	WSLS	Long March 7A	Operational
18	TJS-17	Unknown	Technology demonstration	SAST	2025-04-10	2025-073A	63524	GEO	XSLC	Long March 3B	Operational
19	TJS-19	Unknown	Technology demonstration	SAST	2025-05-12	2025-097A	63924	GEO	XSLC	Long March 3C	Operational
20	TJS-20	Unknown	Technology demonstration	SAST	2025-10-23	2025-238A	66142	GEO	WSLS	Long March 5	Operational
21	TJS-21				2025-11-21			Molniya	XSLC	Long March 3B	
22	TJS-22				2025-12-09			GEO	XSLC	Long March 3B	
23	TJS-23				2025-12-20			GEO	WSLS	Long March 5	

== See also ==
- Yaogan
- Shijian
- EKS (satellite system)
