= Reynald Seznec =

French engineer and businessman (born 1953)

- Born: 11 May 1953 (age 73); Laval, Mayenne, France
- Citizenship: Cannes
- Education: École Polytechnique; École des Ponts et Chaussées
- Scientific career
- Fields: Engineer
- Workplaces: Thales Group, Thales Alenia Space, Cannes Mandelieu Space Center
- Doctoral advisor: Pierre and Marie Curie University

Reynald Seznec (born May 11, 1953 in Laval, Mayenne, France) is a French engineer and businessman. He was the president and CEO of the Franco-Italian company Thales Alenia Space from 2008 to 2012, succeeding to Pascale Sourisse in the Cannes Mandelieu Space Center.
