= Telstar 18 =

Russian communications satellite

Telstar 18 (Apstar 5) is a Russian communications satellite that was launched by a Zenit-3SL rocket from the Ocean Odyssey platform floating on the equatorial Pacific Ocean at 04:00 UT on 29 June 2004. It was intended to be a geostationary satellite, but due to the premature stoppage of the boost from the final DM-SL stage, it ended at 21000 km, far below the geostationary orbit. Trim-maneuver thrusters attached to the satellite were used to slowly raise to geostationary orbit to an approximately geostationary status at 36000 km.

Telstar 18 is designed for a mission life of 13 years. Although fuel use from trim-maneuver thrusters can impact adversely the useful lifespan of a geostationary. The satellite was projected to have enough fuel left to exceed the planned 13 year lifetime.

Telstar 18 provides Ku-band voice, video and data services to China, Hawaii, and East Asia. It also provides C-band services to other parts of the Asia-Pacific region, including Australia and Hawaii. The satellite is used to provide space-based Internet backbone services for the main cities of Asia to and from the United States through Hawaii.
