= Apstar 2R =

Communications Satellite

Apstar 2R, also known as Telstar 10 and SinoSat 1C located at 76.5°E, is a communications satellite equipped with 27 C band and 24 K_{u} band transponders (36 MHz equivalents). The C band payload provides coverage of Asia, Australia, parts of Europe and Africa. The K_{u} band payload covers Korea and China, including Hong Kong, Macau and Taiwan. Telstar 10, which hosts one of the most extensive cable neighborhoods in Asia, distributes cable television programming, direct-to-home services, telecommunications, as well as Internet and VSAT (very small aperture terminal) services.

== See also ==
- Apstar 2
