= Dong Fang Hong =

Satellite program of the People's Republic of China

Dong Fang Hong (Chinese: 东方红; pinyin: Dōngfāng Hóng; lit. 'The East is Red') was a satellite program of the People's Republic of China. The program started in August 1965 as Project 651—a less ambitious successor to the earlier Project 581—with the goal of launching a satellite heavier than both Sputnik 1 and Explorer 1 into space, and developing all the necessary technologies to do so.

== History ==
In 1958, the Chinese Academy of Sciences proposed Project 581 which included a plan to launch a satellite into space before 1 October 1959. The project was troubled due to the country's lack of expertise in the field of rocketry. On 21 January 1959, Zhang Jingfu, who was in charge in the satellite research program, postponed the project to allow effort to be put into developing more basic technologies, such as sounding rocketry. In December 1964, during the 3rd National People's Congress, Zhao Jiuzhang suggested that the work on satellites be resumed. In August 1968, the Central Special Committee approved Chinese Academy of Sciences' plan, which later became Project 651.

In June 1965, the Central Special Committee made the decision to pursue development of a launch vehicle. As per the request of Commission for Science, Technology and Industry for National Defense (COSTIND), the vehicle's first stage and second stage would be based on a DF-4 long range missile. A solid-fueled third stage was added to the design.

On 24 April 1970, Dong Fang Hong 1 was launched. After reaching orbit, it transmitted a tone-generator rendition of the Chinese song "The East is Red" for 28 days.

=== Effect on the name of the Soviet Salyut programme ===
According to Boris Chertok's memoirs, when the first Soviet space station, Salyut 1, was under construction, its designated name was "Zarya" (which means "Dawn", in Russian). When the Soviets realized that the Chinese had a space program with a similar name ("Dongfanghong" was also rendered as Zarya into Russian), they renamed their space station to "Salyut" ("Firework"), to avoid confusion.

== Later iterations ==
Dongfanghong satellite program later developed satellite bus to use the base platform and structure for other Chinese satellites and spacecraft.

=== DFH-2 ===
DFH-2 is the first-generation, spin-stabilized large satellite bus from China, developed in the late 1970s. The first launch was in 1984.

=== DFH-3 ===
DFH-3 is the second-generation 3-axis stabilized, large satellite bus from China, developed in 1987. It could be used for geosynchronous communications and navigation satellites, and deep space exploration.

=== DFH-4 ===
DFH-4 is the third-generation, 3-axis stabilized, large satellite bus developed by China. The satellite bus was designed and developed from 1999 to 2005. The maiden flight was launched on 29 October 2006. The satellite bus had first international customer in 2007.

=== DFH-5 ===
DFH-5 is the fourth-generation, 3-axis stabilized, satellite bus developed by China. First satellite was operational in 2017.

== See also ==
- Space program of China
