= China Satellite Communications =

Chinese aerospace company

- Formerly: China Satellite Communications Corporation
- Type: Subsidiary
- Industry: Aerospace
- Services: satellite communications
- Owner: Chinese Government (via CASC) (99.75%)
- Parent: China Aerospace Science and Technology Corporation
- Website: chinasatcom.com

China Satellite Communications Co., Ltd. known as China Satcom is a Chinese aerospace company that provides services via satellites. The company was a subsidiary of China Aerospace Science and Technology Corporation (CASC).

China Satellite Communications operated the brand ChinaSat. APT Satellite Holdings, a listed company that was jointly controlled by China Satellite Communications and China Great Wall Industry Corporation (another subsidiary of CASC), operated satellites under the brand Apstar.

Before re-incorporated as a limited company, the company was known as China Satellite Communications Corporation.

== History ==
China Satellite Communications Corporation was formed sometime in 2000 by the merger of several satellite companies of the Ministry of Posts and Telecommunications.

In 2009, China Satellite Communications Corporation, a state-owned enterprise that was supervised by the State-owned Assets Supervision and Administration Commission of the State Council directly, was dismantled and distributed to China Aerospace Science and Technology Corporation and China Telecommunications Corporation respectively. However, it also acquired Sino Satellite Communications from CASC as a subsidiary.

In 2017, China Satellite Communications was re-incorporated again as a "company limited by shares", a function analog to public limited company.

== Subsidiaries ==
As of 31 December 2016

- APT Satellite International (42.86%)
  - APT Satellite Holdings (51.77%)
- China Satellite Communications (Hong Kong) (100%)
- Sino Satellite Communications

former

- China Satcom Guomai Communications (now known as Besttone Holding)
