= Xichang Satellite Launch Center =

Chinese satellite launch facility

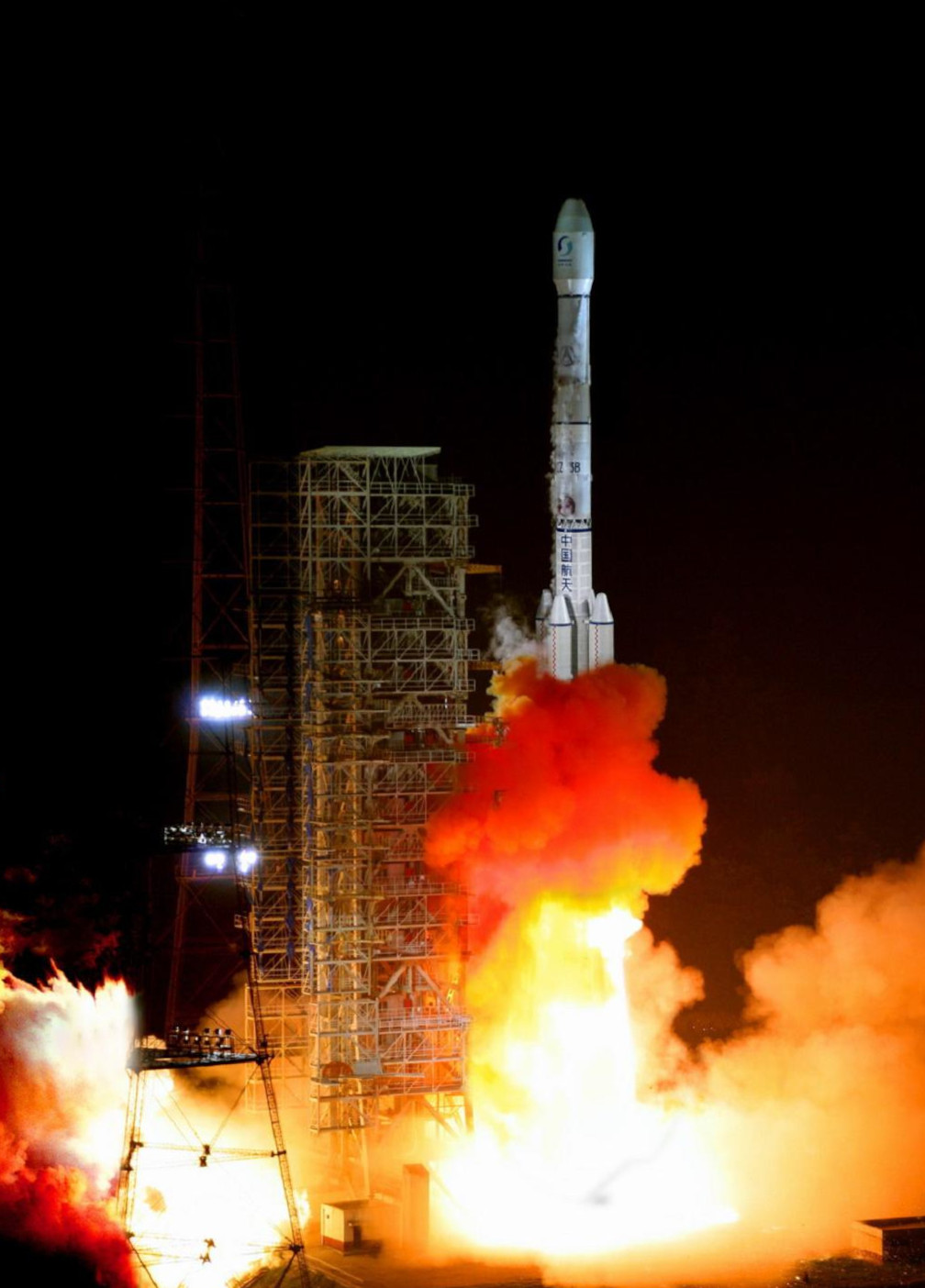
- The launch of Long March 3B Rocket, Xichang Satellite Launch Center, China.
- Interactive map of Xichang Satellite Launch Center
- Location: Xichang, Liangshan, Sichuan
- Coordinates: 28°14′44″N 102°1′36″E
- Short name: XSLC
- Operator: CASC
- Total launches: 243 (Note: In addition to the launches carried out from LA-2 and LA-3, 8 more launches of small-lift launch vehicles (Long March 11 and Kuaizhou 1A) have been performed in a undesignated area.)
- Launch pad: Three
Launch Complex 2 launch history
- Status: Active
- Launches: 131
- First launch: July 15, 1990; Long March 2E / Badr A & Aussat B-MFS
- Last launch: July 23, 2026; Long March 3B / Tianlian II-06
- Associated rockets: Long March 2E; Long March 3A; Long March 3B; Long March 3C
Launch Complex 3 launch history
- Status: Active
- Launches: 104
- First launch: January 29, 1984; Long March 3 / DFH-2 01
- Last launch: November 5, 2026; Long March 2C / Yaogan-51 07 to 09
- Associated rockets: Long March 3 Long March 2C; Long March 3A; Long March 3B; Long March 3C; Long March 4C; Long March 2D; Long March 4B
Mobile Launcher Pad launch history
- Status: Active
- Launches: 8
- First launch: May 29, 2020; Long March 11 / XJS-G & XJS-H
- Last launch: July 31, 2025; Kuaizhou 1A / PRSC-S1
- Associated rockets: Long March 11; Kuaizhou 1A

Xichang Satellite Launch Center
- Simplified Chinese: 西昌卫星发射中心
- Traditional Chinese: 西昌衛星發射中心
Transcriptions
Standard Mandarin
- Hanyu Pinyin: Xīchāng Wèixīng Fāshè Zhōngxīn

The Xichang Satellite Launch Center (XSLC), also known as the Xichang Space Center, is a spaceport in China. It is located in Zeyuan town (泽远镇), Mianning county, approximately 64 kilometers (40 mi) northwest of Xichang, Liangshan Yi Autonomous Prefecture in Sichuan.

It is operated by the People's Liberation Army Aerospace Force (formerly the People's Liberation Army Strategic Support Force) and is known as the 27th Experimental Training base (MUCD: Unit 63790).

The facility became operational in 1984 and is used to launch numerous civil, scientific, and military payloads annually. It is notable as the site of Sino-European space cooperation, with the launch of the first of two Double Star scientific satellites in December 2003. Chinese officials have indicated interest in conducting additional international satellite launches from XSLC.

In 1996, a fatal accident occurred when the Long March 3B rocket carrying the Intelsat 708 satellite failed on its maiden launch from the Xichang Satellite Launch Center, killing at least 6 people in a nearby rural village. Uncontrolled debris from launches continues to fall in the vicinity, most recently in December 2023 and June 2024.

A 2007 test of an anti-satellite missile was launched from the center.

== History ==
=== China's first crewed space program ===
In order to support the Chinese Project 714 crewed space program in the 1960s, the construction of a new space center at Xichang in the Sichuan province was decided, located farther from the Soviet border, thus safer. This construction was part of the Third Front campaign to develop basic industry and national security industry in the rugged interior of China to prepare for potential United States or Soviet Union invasion.

The Shuguang One spacecraft was expected to be launched from the launch pad number one. After the cancellation of the program, the launch pad was never completed. Today, a viewing platform for officials has been built at the site.

=== First Long March-2E carrier rocket ===
China launched its first Long March-2E carrier rocket on July 16, 1990, sending into orbit Pakistan's first indigenously developed Badr-1 satellite and HS-601.

=== 1996 Launch accident ===
On February 15, 1996, a fatal accident occurred when the first new Long March 3B heavy carrier rocket carrying Intelsat 708 veered off course 2 seconds after launch, crashing 1200 meters away from the launch pad into a hillside, destroying 80 homes in a nearby mountain village. According to the official report, six people died and 57 were injured. The number of civilian deaths has been disputed, with estimates of the number of casualties as around a few hundred. The village that was damaged in this accident later got demolished.

=== China's first successful ASAT test ===
On January 11, 2007, China conducted an anti-satellite missile test with an SC-19 ASAT weapon.

A Chinese weather satellite — the FY-1C polar orbit satellite of the Fengyun series, at an altitude of 865 kilometers (537 mi), with a mass of 750 kg — was destroyed by a kinetic kill vehicle.

The SC-19 has been described as being based on a modified DF-21 ballistic missile or its commercial derivative, the KT-2 with a Kinetic Kill Vehicle and is fully mobile.

=== Beginning of China's lunar exploration program ===
On October 24, 2007, Chang'e 1, an un-crewed Moon orbiter of the Chang'e program, was successfully launched from the facility, marking the beginning of China's lunar exploration program.

=== First Long March-3C carrier rocket ===
China launched its first Long March-3C carrier rocket on April 25, 2008. This was the 105th mission of China's Long March series of rockets, and also the launch of the nation's first data relay satellite (数据中继卫星) Tianlian I (天链一号).

A new launch pad for next-generation rockets (such as Long March 8) is currently under construction, as of December 2019.

== Facilities ==
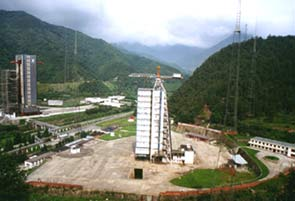
Xichang Satellite Launch Center launch complexes

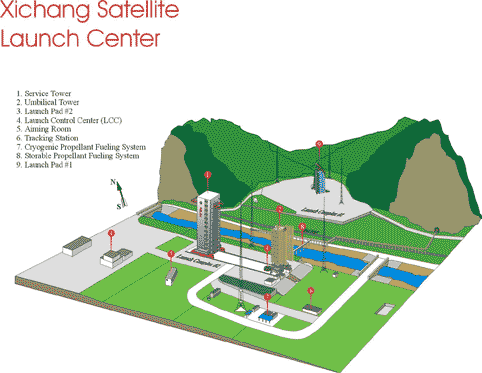
Xichang Satellite Launch Center diagram

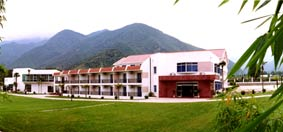
Hotel for foreign engineers

=== Launch Complexes ===
Three launch complexes were planned, and two were built:

Launch Complex 1 (LC-1), not built, was intended as the Shuguang launch site, later used as a viewing area.

Launch Complex 2 (LC-2 or LA-2), located at 28.2455°N 102.0267°E, and used for launching Long March 2E, Long March 3A, Long March 3B and Long March 3C rockets.

Launch Complex 3 (LC-3 or LA-3), also known as LA-1, and located at 28.2470°N 102.0291°E. Used for launching Long March 2C, Long March 3, Long March 3A and Long March 3B rockets. Demolished and rebuilt between 2005 and 2006. Upgraded in order to support the Chinese Lunar Exploration Program. Demolished and rebuilt again between 2013 and 2015.

Mobile Launcher Pad, is used by CASIC's Kuaizhou-1A rocket to launch from Xichang.

=== Technical Center ===
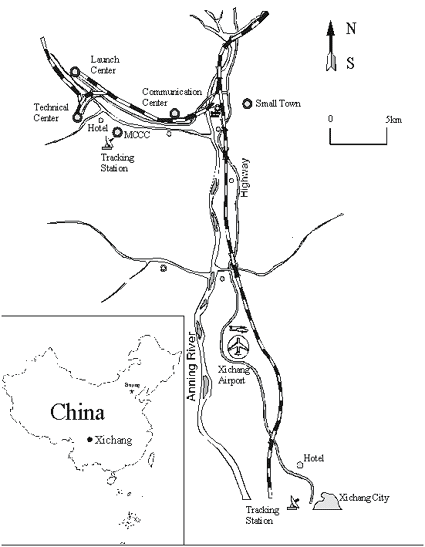
Map of the Xichang Satellite Launch Center and its neighborhood

XSLC's Technical Center is equipped for testing and integration of the payload and launch vehicle. Its Mission Command and Control Center is located 7 kilometers (4.3 mi) southwest of the launch pads, and provides flight and safety control during overall system rehearsal and launch. It is serviced by a dedicated railway and highway directly from Xichang Qingshan Airport and Manshuiwan railway station, which is about 50 kilometers (31 mi) away from the launch site. Two launch complexes at the facility support flight operations.

=== Residential Area ===
The Residential Area of XSLC was built to house workers of the launch center, and consists of:

- "Coordination building" (Residential complex with an office and dormitories for Chinese employees of XSLC)
- Hotel for foreign workers (Located right next to the Coordination building)
- Logistics facilities, Cooperation Building, hospital
- Space park

The Residential area is located right next to the main gate of the launch center, and is connected to other facilities by a highway and railroad.

On February 15, 1996, The Long March 3B carrying Intelsat 708 crashed into a hillside in front of the Coordination Building and right next to the main gate of the launch center.

Located right next to the main gate of the launch center was Mayelin Village (not to be confused with Mayelin), which has disappeared following the Intelsat 708 disaster. Several villages and small towns, such as Mayelin, still exist near XSLC.

== Launches ==
=== Previous launches ===
Date	Vehicle	Launch Pad	Payload	Orbit	Outcome	Notes
29 January 1984 12:25 UTC	Long March 3 Y1	LA-3	STTW 1	GTO	Partial Failure	
April 8, 1984; 11:20	Long March 3	LA-3	STTW 2	GTO	Success	
February 1, 1986; 12:37	Long March 3	LA-3	DFH-2-1	GTO	Success	
March 7, 1988; 12:41	Long March 3	LA-3	DFH-2A-1 (ChinaSat 1)	GTO	Success	
December 22, 1988; 12:40	Long March 3	LA-3	DFH-2A-2 (ChinaSat 2)	GTO	Success	
February 4, 1990; 12:28	Long March 3	LA-3	DFH-2A-3 (ChinaSat 3)	GTO	Success	
April 7, 1990; 13:30	Long March 3	LA-3	AsiaSat 1	GTO	Success	
June 16, 1990	Long March 2E/EPKM	LA-2	Badr-1; Aussat B-MFS	GTO	Partial Failure	
December 28, 1991; 12:00	Long March 3	LA-3	DFH-2A-4 (ChinaSat 4)	GTO (intended)	Failure	
August 14, 1992	Long March 2E	LA-2	Optus B1	GTO	Success	
December 21, 1992	Long March 2E	LA-2	Optus B2	GTO	Failure	
February 8, 1994	Long March 3A	LA-2	Shijian 4 Kuafu-1	GTO	Success	
July 21, 1994; 10:55	Long March 3	LA-3	APStar 1	GTO	Success	
August 28, 1994	Long March 2E	LA-2	Optus B3	GTO	Success	
November 29, 1994	Long March 3A	LA-2	ChinaSat 5	GTO	Success	
June 26, 1995	Long March 2E	LA-2	APStar 2	GTO	Failure	
November 28, 1995	Long March 2E/EPKM	LA-2	AsiaSat 1	GTO	Partial Failure	
December 28, 1995	Long March 2E/EPKM	LA-2	EchoStar 1	GTO	Success	
July 3, 1996; 10:47	Long March 3	LA-3	APStar 1A	GTO	Success	
August 18, 1996; 10:27	Long March 3	LA-3	ChinaSat 7	GTO (intended)	Failure	
June 10, 1997; 12:01	Long March 3	LA-3	Fengyun 2A	GTO	Success	
June 25, 2000; 11:50	Long March 3	LA-3	Fengyun 2B	GTO	Success	

=== Recent launches ===
Date	Vehicle	Serial number	Launch Pad	Payload	Outcome	Notes
20 April 2024 23:45 UTC	Long March 2D	2D-Y103	LC-3	Yaogan 42-02	Success	

=== Upcoming launches ===
Date	Vehicle	Serial number	Launch Pad	Payload	Outcome	Notes
May 7, 2024	Long March 3B/E	3B-Y	LC-2	Shiyan 10-03	Planned	
2024	Long March 3B/E	3B-Y		Gaofen 15	Planned	
2024	Long March 3B/E	3B-Y		Tiantong-1 04	Planned	
2024	Long March 3B/E	3B-Y		BeiDou-3 G5	Planned	
2024	Long March 3B/E	3B-Y		Tianhui-3	Planned	

== See also ==
- Chinese space program
- Jiuquan Satellite Launch Center
- Taiyuan Satellite Launch Center
- Wenchang Satellite Launch Center
