= List of Long March launches =

This is a list of launches made by the Long March rocket family. Launch attempts aborted or scrubbed before liftoff, including ones such as the attempt to launch a Long March 2E with Optus B1 on 22 March 1992, where the engines were ignited but shut down on the pad, are not included. Launches made with the related Feng Bao 1 carrier rocket are not included.

Due to the size of the list, it has been split into several smaller articles:

- List of Long March launches (1970–1979)
- List of Long March launches (1980–1989)
- List of Long March launches (1990–1999)
- List of Long March launches (2000–2009)
- List of Long March launches (2010–2019)
- List of Long March launches (2020–2024)
- List of Long March launches (2025–2029)

== Launch statistics ==
Rockets from the Long March family have accumulated a total of 679 launches as of 20 November 2026. Of these, 658 were successful, 12 were failures, and 9 were partial failures. The cumulative success rate is 96.9%. Note that the statistics listed in this paragraph are correct having been sourced from CNSA launch announcement; in addition, the annual numbers of launches listed in following bar chart is also correct. However, the tables of launches in the linked decadal lists may have errors of omission for the years prior to 2020.

- Failure
- Partial failure
- Success
- Planned

=== Anomalies and failures ===
A success is a launch that deploys all payloads into the correct orbit without damage. The launch vehicle may experience an anomaly that does not affect the mission. The payload may experience an anomaly that was not caused by the launch.

- On 29 November 1994, the Long March 3A successfully deployed Chinasat-5 into geostationary transfer orbit. However, the satellite failed to reach geostationary orbit due to a propellant leak.
- On 3 November 2016, the Long March 5 experienced an anomaly in the second stage, failing to deploy the stack into the correct geostationary transfer orbit. However, the third stage was able to compensate for the performance shortfall with a longer burn.

A partial failure is a launch that reaches orbit, but at least one payload was not deployed into the correct orbit or suffered damage. After a partial failure, a satellite may operate at reduced functionality or with a reduced lifetime. A common type of partial failure occurs when a satellite is deployed into a lower than intended orbit. The satellite can maneuver with its own propulsion system to reach the correct orbit, but this reduces the fuel available for station-keeping and shortens its operational life.

- On 29 January 1984, the maiden launch of the Long March 3 failed to reach geostationary transfer orbit.
- On 28 December 1991, the Long March 3 failed to deploy DFH-2A-4 (ChinaSat 4) into geostationary transfer orbit.
- On 21 December 1992, the Long March 2E experienced a structural failure of the payload fairing, destroying the Optus B2 communications satellite. The satellite's debris reached the correct orbit.
- On 28 November 1995, the Long March 2E damaged AsiaSat 2 by subjecting it to excessive forces during the launch. The satellite was unable to broadcast to its full coverage area.
- On 18 August 1996, the Long March 3 failed to deploy ChinaSat 7 into geostationary transfer orbit.
- On 31 August 2009, the Long March 3B failed to deploy Palapa-D into geostationary transfer orbit. The satellite reached the intended orbit with its own propulsion system.
- On 28 December 2016, the Long March 2D failed to deploy the payloads into Sun-synchronous orbit. The primary payloads reached the correct orbit with their own propulsion systems, but the secondary payload had no propulsion system and reentered two months later.
- On 18 June 2017, the Long March 3B failed to deploy ChinaSat 9A into geostationary transfer orbit. The satellite maneuvered 10 times over a one-month period to reach the correct orbit.
- On 13 March 2024, the Long March 2C failed to deploy the DRO-A and DRO-B satellites into the planned trans-lunar injection orbit because of a failure of the YZ-1A upper stage. The satellites however were able to reach their intended Distant Retrograde Orbit around the Moon under their own power and are operating normally.

A failure is a launch that does not deploy it into earth orbit.

- On 5 November 1974, the Long March 2 lost control during its maiden launch.
- On 25 January 1995, the Long March 2E experienced another structural failure in the payload fairing, destroying the Apstar 2 communications satellite.
- On 14 February 1996, the Long March 3B lost its guidance platform and veered off course, hitting a nearby village and killing at least 6 people.
- On 18 August 2011, the Long March 2C lost attitude control.
- On 9 December 2013, the Long March 4B experienced an early shutdown of its third stage and failed to reach orbit.
- On 31 August 2016, the Long March 4C failed to reach orbit.
- On 2 July 2017, the Long March 5 experienced an anomaly in its first stage and failed to reach orbit.
- On 22 May 2019, the Long March 4C failed to reach orbit due to a problem with its third stage.
- On 16 March 2020, the first Long March 7A failed to reach orbit.
- On 9 April 2020, the Long March 3B failed to reach orbit with the Palapa-N1 (Nusantara Dua) satellite due to third stage failure.

== Sources ==
- McDowell, Jonathan. "Launch Log". Jonathan's Space Page.
- McDowell, Jonathan. "Satellite Catalog". Jonathan's Space Page.
- Krebs, Gunter. "CZ-1 (Chang Zheng-1)".
- Krebs, Gunter. "DF-5 family".
