= List of Long March launches (1990–1999) =

This is a list of launches made by the Long March rocket family between 1990 and 1999.

== Launch statistics ==
=== Rocket configurations ===
- Long March 2C
- Long March 2D
- Long March 2E
- Long March 2F
- Long March 3
- Long March 3A
- Long March 3B
- Long March 4A
- Long March 4B

=== Launch outcomes ===
- Failure
- Partial failure
- Success

== Launch history ==
=== 1990 ===
| Date/time (UTC) | Rocket | Serial number | Launch site | Outcome |
|---|---|---|---|---|
| Date/time (UTC) | Payload | Separation orbit | Operator | Function |
| Date/time (UTC) | Remarks | | | |
| 4 February 1990; 12:28 | Long March 3 | F-06 | Xichang LA-3 | Successful |
| 4 February 1990; 12:28 | Chinasat-3 (DFH-2A-T4) | Geosynchronous transfer | | Communication |
| 7 April 1990; 13:30 | Long March 3 | F-07 | Xichang LA-3 | Successful |
| 7 April 1990; 13:30 | AsiaSat 1 | Geosynchronous transfer | AsiaSat | Communication |
| 7 April 1990; 13:30 | First Chinese orbital launch for a foreign customer | | | |
| 16 July 1990; 00:40 | Long March 2E | F-01 | Xichang LA-2 | Successful |
| 16 July 1990; 00:40 | Optus-B mass simulator | Low Earth | | Flight testing |
| 16 July 1990; 00:40 | Badr A | Low Earth | | Technology |
| 16 July 1990; 00:40 | Maiden flight of Long March 2E. | | | |
| 3 September 1990; 00:53 | Long March 4A | F-02 | Taiyuan LA-7 | Successful |
| 3 September 1990; 00:53 | Fengyun-1B | Sun synchronous | | Meteorology |
| 3 September 1990; 00:53 | Final flight of Long March 4A. | | | |
| 5 October 1990; 06:14 | Long March 2C | F-09 | Jiuquan LA-2/138 | Successful |
| 5 October 1990; 06:14 | FSW-1 No.3 | Low Earth | | Reconnaissance |

=== 1991 ===
| Date/time (UTC) | Rocket | Serial number | Launch site | Outcome |
|---|---|---|---|---|
| Date/time (UTC) | Payload | Separation orbit | Operator | Function |
| Date/time (UTC) | Remarks | | | |
| 28 December 1991; 12:00 | Long March 3 | F-08 | Xichang LA-3 | Partial failure |
| 28 December 1991; 12:00 | Chinasat-4 (DFH-2A-T5) | Geosynchronous transfer | | Communication |
| 28 December 1991; 12:00 | Satellite left in unusable orbit due to the third stage shutting down earlier than planned. | | | |

=== 1992 ===
| Date/time (UTC) | Rocket | Serial number | Launch site | Outcome |
|---|---|---|---|---|
| Date/time (UTC) | Payload | Separation orbit | Operator | Function |
| Date/time (UTC) | Remarks | | | |
| 9 August 1992; 08:00 | Long March 2D | F-01 | Jiuquan LA-2/138 | Successful |
| 9 August 1992; 08:00 | FSW-2 No.1 | Low Earth | | Reconnaissance |
| 9 August 1992; 08:00 | Maiden flight of Long March 2D. | | | |
| 13 August 1992; 23:00 | Long March 2E/Star-63F | F-02 | Xichang LA-2 | Successful |
| 13 August 1992; 23:00 | Optus-B1 | Geosynchronous transfer | AUSSAT | Communication |
| 6 October 1992; 06:20 | Long March 2C | F-10 | Jiuquan LA-2/138 | Successful |
| 6 October 1992; 06:20 | FSW-1 No.4 | Low Earth | | Reconnaissance |
| 6 October 1992; 06:20 | Freja | Low Earth | Swedish Space Corporation | Technology |
| 21 December 1992; 11:21 | Long March 2E/Star-63F | F-03 | Xichang LA-2 | Partial failure |
| 21 December 1992; 11:21 | Optus-B2 | Geosynchronous transfer (planned) | AUSSAT | Communication |
| 21 December 1992; 11:21 | Structural failure of payload fairing 48 seconds after launch, destroying the satellite, whose debris went on to reach the correct orbit. | | | |

=== 1993 ===
| Date/time (UTC) | Rocket | Serial number | Launch site | Outcome |
|---|---|---|---|---|
| Date/time (UTC) | Payload | Separation orbit | Operator | Function |
| Date/time (UTC) | Remarks | | | |
| 8 October 1993; 08:00 | Long March 2C | F-11 | Jiuquan LA-2/138 | Successful |
| 8 October 1993; 08:00 | FSW-1 No.5 | Low Earth | | Reconnaissance |

=== 1994 ===
| Date/time (UTC) | Rocket | Serial number | Launch site | Outcome |
|---|---|---|---|---|
| Date/time (UTC) | Payload | Separation orbit | Operator | Function |
| Date/time (UTC) | Remarks | | | |
| 8 February 1994; 08:34 | Long March 3A | F-01 | Xichang LA-2 | Successful |
| 8 February 1994; 08:34 | Shijian 4 | Geosynchronous transfer | | Magnetosphere research |
| 8 February 1994; 08:34 | Kuafu-1 (DFH-3 mass simulator) | Geosynchronous transfer | | Flight testing |
| 8 February 1994; 08:34 | Maiden flight of Long March 3A. | | | |
| 3 July 1994; 08:00 | Long March 2D | F-02 | Jiuquan LA-2/138 | Successful |
| 3 July 1994; 08:00 | FSW-2 No.2 | Low Earth | | Reconnaissance |
| 21 July 1994; 10:55 | Long March 3 | F-09 | Xichang LA-3 | Successful |
| 21 July 1994; 10:55 | Apstar 1 | Geosynchronous transfer | Apstar | Communication |
| 27 August 1994; 23:10 | Long March 2E/Star-63F | F-04 | Xichang LA-2 | Successful |
| 27 August 1994; 23:10 | Optus-B3 | Geosynchronous transfer | AUSSAT | Communication |
| 29 November 1994; 17:02 | Long March 3A | F-02 | Xichang LA-2 | Successful |
| 29 November 1994; 17:02 | Chinasat-5 | Geosynchronous transfer | | Communication |
| 29 November 1994; 17:02 | Satellite failed to reach the operational orbit due to a propellant leak in GTO. | | | |

=== 1995 ===
| Date/time (UTC) | Rocket | Serial number | Launch site | Outcome |
|---|---|---|---|---|
| Date/time (UTC) | Payload | Separation orbit | Operator | Function |
| Date/time (UTC) | Remarks | | | |
| 25 January 1995; 22:40 | Long March 2E/Star-63F | F-05 | Xichang LA-2 | Failure |
| 25 January 1995; 22:40 | Apstar 2 | Geosynchronous transfer (planned) | Apstar | Communication |
| 25 January 1995; 22:40 | Payload fairing collapsed due to structural deficiency, aggravated by excessive vibration caused by wind shear. | | | |
| 28 November 1995; 11:30 | Long March 2E/EPKM | F-06 | Xichang LA-2 | Partial failure |
| 28 November 1995; 11:30 | AsiaSat 2 | Geosynchronous transfer | AsiaSat | Communication |
| 28 November 1995; 11:30 | Excessive acceleration during the launch knocked the antenna feed horns out of alignment, reducing the coverage area of the Ku band transponders. AsiaSat filed a satellite insurance claim for $58 million. | | | |
| 28 December 1995; 11:50 | Long March 2E/EPKM | F-07 | Xichang LA-2 | Successful |
| 28 December 1995; 11:50 | EchoStar 1 | Geosynchronous transfer | EchoStar | Communication |

=== 1996 ===
| Date/time (UTC) | Rocket | Serial number | Launch site | Outcome |
|---|---|---|---|---|
| Date/time (UTC) | Payload | Separation orbit | Operator | Function |
| Date/time (UTC) | Remarks | | | |
| 14 February 1996; 19:01 | Long March 3B | F-01 | Xichang LA-2 | Failure |
| 14 February 1996; 19:01 | Intelsat 708 | Geosynchronous transfer (planned) | Intelsat | Communication |
| 14 February 1996; 19:01 | Maiden flight of Long March 3B. Guidance platform short-circuited right at liftoff, leading to loss of attitude control. The vehicle hit the ground at T+23 seconds and exploded, killing at least 6 people on the ground. | | | |
| 3 July 1996; 10:47 | Long March 3 | F-10 | Xichang LA-3 | Successful |
| 3 July 1996; 10:47 | Apstar 1A | Geosynchronous transfer | Apstar | Communication |
| 18 August 1996; 10:27 | Long March 3 | F-11 | Xichang LA-3 | Partial failure |
| 18 August 1996; 10:27 | Chinasat-7 | Geosynchronous transfer | | Communication |
| 18 August 1996; 10:27 | Third stage engine shut down 48 seconds too early. | | | |
| 20 October 1996; 07:20 | Long March 2D | F-03 | Jiuquan LA-2/138 | Successful |
| 20 October 1996; 07:20 | FSW-2 No.3 | Low Earth | | Reconnaissance |

=== 1997 ===
| Date/time (UTC) | Rocket | Serial number | Launch site | Outcome |
|---|---|---|---|---|
| Date/time (UTC) | Payload | Separation orbit | Operator | Function |
| Date/time (UTC) | Remarks | | | |
| 11 May 1997; 16:17 | Long March 3A | F-03 | Xichang LA-2 | Successful |
| 11 May 1997; 16:17 | Chinasat-6 | Geosynchronous transfer | | Communication |
| 10 June 1997; 12:01 | Long March 3 | F-12 | Xichang LA-3 | Successful |
| 10 June 1997; 12:01 | Fengyun-2A | Geosynchronous transfer | | Meteorology |
| 19 August 1997; 17:50 | Long March 3B | F-02 | Xichang LA-2 | Successful |
| 19 August 1997; 17:50 | Agila-2 | Geosynchronous transfer | Mabuhay | Communication |
| 1 September 1997; 14:00 | Long March 2C / SD | F-12 | Taiyuan LA-7 | Successful |
| 1 September 1997; 14:00 | Iridium mass simulator A | Low Earth | | Flight testing |
| 1 September 1997; 14:00 | Iridium mass simulator B | Low Earth | | Flight testing |
| 16 October 1997; 19:13 | Long March 3B | F-03 | Xichang LA-2 | Successful |
| 16 October 1997; 19:13 | Apstar 2R | Geosynchronous transfer | Apstar | Communication |
| 8 December 1997; 07:16 | Long March 2C / SD | F-13 | Taiyuan LA-7 | Successful |
| 8 December 1997; 07:16 | Iridium 42 | Low Earth | Iridium Communications Inc. | Communication |
| 8 December 1997; 07:16 | Iridium 44 | Low Earth | Iridium Communications Inc. | Communication |

=== 1998 ===
| Date/time (UTC) | Rocket | Serial number | Launch site | Outcome |
|---|---|---|---|---|
| Date/time (UTC) | Payload | Separation orbit | Operator | Function |
| Date/time (UTC) | Remarks | | | |
| 25 March 1998; 17:01 | Long March 2C / SD | F-14 | Taiyuan LA-7 | Successful |
| 25 March 1998; 17:01 | Iridium 51 | Low Earth | Iridium Communications Inc. | Communication |
| 25 March 1998; 17:01 | Iridium 61 | Low Earth | Iridium Communications Inc. | Communication |
| 2 May 1998; 09:16 | Long March 2C / SD | F-15 | Taiyuan LA-7 | Successful |
| 2 May 1998; 09:16 | Iridium 69 | Low Earth | Iridium Communications Inc. | Communication |
| 2 May 1998; 09:16 | Iridium 71 | Low Earth | Iridium Communications Inc. | Communication |
| 30 May 1998; 10:00 | Long March 3B | F-04 | Xichang LA-2 | Successful |
| 30 May 1998; 10:00 | ChinaStar 1 | Geosynchronous transfer | China Orient Telecommunications Satellite Co. | Communication |
| 18 July 1998; 09:20 | Long March 3B | F-05 | Xichang LA-2 | Successful |
| 18 July 1998; 09:20 | SinoSat 1 | Geosynchronous transfer | Sino Satellite Communications | Communication |
| 19 August 1998; 23:01 | Long March 2C / SD | F-16 | Taiyuan LA-7 | Successful |
| 19 August 1998; 23:01 | Iridium 76 | Low Earth | Iridium Communications Inc. | Communication |
| 19 August 1998; 23:01 | Iridium 78 | Low Earth | Iridium Communications Inc. | Communication |
| 19 December 1998; 11:39 | Long March 2C / SD | F-17 | Taiyuan LA-7 | Successful |
| 19 December 1998; 11:39 | Iridium 88 | Low Earth | Iridium Communications Inc. | Communication |
| 19 December 1998; 11:39 | Iridium 89 | Low Earth | Iridium Communications Inc. | Communication |

=== 1999 ===
| Date/time (UTC) | Rocket | Serial number | Launch site | Outcome |
|---|---|---|---|---|
| Date/time (UTC) | Payload | Separation orbit | Operator | Function |
| Date/time (UTC) | Remarks | | | |
| 10 May 1999; 01:33 | Long March 4B | F-01 | Taiyuan LA-7 | Successful |
| 10 May 1999; 01:33 | Fengyun-1C | Sun synchronous | | Meteorology |
| 10 May 1999; 01:33 | Shijian 5 | Sun synchronous | | Technology |
| 10 May 1999; 01:33 | Maiden flight of Long March 4B. | | | |
| 11 June 1999; 17:15 | Long March 2C / SD | F-18 | Taiyuan LA-7 | Successful |
| 11 June 1999; 17:15 | Iridium 92 | Low Earth | Iridium Communications Inc. | Communication |
| 11 June 1999; 17:15 | Iridium 93 | Low Earth | Iridium Communications Inc. | Communication |
| 14 October 1999; 03:15 | Long March 4B | F-02 | Taiyuan LA-7 | Successful |
| 14 October 1999; 03:15 | CBERS-1 | Sun synchronous | | Earth observation |
| 14 October 1999; 03:15 | SACI 1 | Sun synchronous | INPE | Technology |
| 19 November 1999; 22:30 | Long March 2F | F-01 | Jiuquan LA-4/SLS-1 | Successful |
| 19 November 1999; 22:30 | Shenzhou 1 | Low Earth | | Technology |
| 19 November 1999; 22:30 | Maiden flight of Long March 2F. | | | |

== Sources ==
- McDowell, Jonathan. "Launch Log". Jonathan's Space Page.
- McDowell, Jonathan. "Satellite Catalog". Jonathan's Space Page.
- Krebs, Gunter. "DF-5 family".
