= List of Long March launches (2010–2019) =

This is a list of launches made by the Long March rocket family between 2010 and 2019.

== Launch statistics ==
=== Rocket configurations ===
- Long March 2C
- Long March 2D
- Long March 2F
- Long March 3A
- Long March 3B
- Long March 3C
- Long March 4B
- Long March 4C
- Long March 5
- Long March 6
- Long March 7
- Long March 11

=== Launch outcomes ===
- Failure
- Partial failure
- Success

== Launch history ==
=== 2010 ===
| Date/time (UTC) | Rocket | Serial number | Launch site | Outcome |
|---|---|---|---|---|
| Date/time (UTC) | Payload | Separation orbit | Operator | Function |
| Date/time (UTC) | Remarks | | | |
| 16 January 2010; 16:12 | Long March 3C | F-03 | Xichang LA-2 | Successful |
| 16 January 2010; 16:12 | Compass-G1 | Geosynchronous transfer | | Navigation |
| 5 March 2010; 04:55 | Long March 4C | F-05 | Jiuquan LA-4/SLS-2 | Successful |
| 5 March 2010; 04:55 | Yaogan 9A | Low Earth | | Reconnaissance |
| 5 March 2010; 04:55 | Yaogan 9B | Low Earth | | Reconnaissance |
| 5 March 2010; 04:55 | Yaogan 9C | Low Earth | | Reconnaissance |
| 2 June 2010; 15:53 | Long March 3C | F-04 | Xichang LA-2 | Successful |
| 2 June 2010; 15:53 | Compass-G3 | Geosynchronous transfer | | Navigation |
| 15 June 2010; 01:39 | Long March 2D | F-12 | Jiuquan LA-4/SLS-2 | Successful |
| 15 June 2010; 01:39 | Shijian 12 | Sun synchronous | | Technology |
| 31 July 2010; 21:30 | Long March 3A | F-17 | Xichang LA-3 | Successful |
| 31 July 2010; 21:30 | Compass-IGSO1 | Geosynchronous transfer | | Navigation |
| 9 August 2010; 22:49 | Long March 4C | F-06 | Taiyuan LA-9 | Successful |
| 9 August 2010; 22:49 | Yaogan 10 | Sun synchronous | | Reconnaissance |
| 24 August 2010; 07:10 | Long March 2D | F-13 | Jiuquan LA-4/SLS-2 | Successful |
| 24 August 2010; 07:10 | Tianhui-1 | Sun synchronous | | Reconnaissance |
| 4 September 2010; 16:14 | Long March 3B/E | F-13 | Xichang LA-2 | Successful |
| 4 September 2010; 16:14 | Chinasat-6A | Geosynchronous transfer | | Communication |
| 22 September 2010; 02:42 | Long March 2D | F-14 | Jiuquan LA-4/SLS-2 | Successful |
| 22 September 2010; 02:42 | Yaogan 11 | Sun synchronous | | Reconnaissance |
| 22 September 2010; 02:42 | ZDPS-1A | Sun synchronous | Zhejiang University | Technology |
| 22 September 2010; 02:42 | ZDPS-1B | Sun synchronous | Zhejiang University | Technology |
| 1 October 2010; 10:59 | Long March 3C | F-05 | Xichang LA-2 | Successful |
| 1 October 2010; 10:59 | Chang'e 2 | Lunar transfer | CNSA | Lunar orbiter |
| 6 October 2010; 00:49 | Long March 4B | F-13 | Taiyuan LA-9 | Successful |
| 6 October 2010; 00:49 | Shijian 6-04A | Sun synchronous | | Technology / Reconnaissance |
| 6 October 2010; 00:49 | Shijian 6-04B | Sun synchronous | | Technology / Reconnaissance |
| 31 October 2010; 16:26 | Long March 3C | F-06 | Xichang LA-2 | Successful |
| 31 October 2010; 16:26 | Compass-G4 | Geosynchronous transfer | | Navigation |
| 4 November 2010; 18:37 | Long March 4C | F-07 | Taiyuan LA-9 | Successful |
| 4 November 2010; 18:37 | Fengyun-3B | Sun synchronous | | Meteorology |
| 24 November 2010; 16:09 | Long March 3A | F-18 | Xichang LA-3 | Successful |
| 24 November 2010; 16:09 | Chinasat-20A | Geosynchronous transfer | | Communication |
| 17 December 2010; 20:20 | Long March 3A | F-19 | Xichang LA-3 | Successful |
| 17 December 2010; 20:20 | Compass-IGSO2 | Geosynchronous transfer | | Navigation |

=== 2011 ===
| Date/time (UTC) | Rocket | Serial number | Launch site | Outcome |
|---|---|---|---|---|
| Date/time (UTC) | Payload | Separation orbit | Operator | Function |
| Date/time (UTC) | Remarks | | | |
| 9 April 2011; 20:47 | Long March 3A | F-20 | Xichang LA-3 | Successful |
| 9 April 2011; 20:47 | Compass-IGSO3 | Geosynchronous transfer | | Navigation |
| 20 June 2011; 16:13 | Long March 3B/E | F-14 | Xichang LA-2 | Successful |
| 20 June 2011; 16:13 | SinoSat 5 (Chinasat-10) | Geosynchronous transfer | | Communication |
| 6 July 2011; 04:28 | Long March 2C | F-30 | Jiuquan LA-4/SLS-2 | Successful |
| 6 July 2011; 04:28 | Shijian 11-03 | Sun synchronous | | Technology |
| 11 July 2011; 15:41 | Long March 3C | F-07 | Xichang LA-2 | Successful |
| 11 July 2011; 15:41 | Tianlian-1B | Geosynchronous transfer | | Communication / Data transfer |
| 26 July 2011; 21:44 | Long March 3A | F-21 | Xichang LA-3 | Successful |
| 26 July 2011; 21:44 | Compass-IGSO4 | Geosynchronous transfer | | Navigation |
| 29 July 2011; 07:42 | Long March 2C | F-31 | Jiuquan LA-4/SLS-2 | Successful |
| 29 July 2011; 07:42 | Shijian 11-02 | Sun synchronous | | Technology |
| 11 August 2011; 16:15 | Long March 3B/E | F-15 | Xichang LA-2 | Successful |
| 11 August 2011; 16:15 | PAKSAT-1R | Geosynchronous transfer | | Communication |
| 15 August 2011; 22:57 | Long March 4B | F-14 | Taiyuan LA-9 | Successful |
| 15 August 2011; 22:57 | Haiyang-2A | Sun synchronous | | Ocean observation |
| 18 August 2011; 09:28 | Long March 2C | F-32 | Jiuquan LA-4/SLS-2 | Failure |
| 18 August 2011; 09:28 | Shijian 11-04 | Sun synchronous (intended) | | Technology |
| 18 August 2011; 09:28 | Second stage vernier engine support structure failed in flight, led to loss of attitude control. | | | |
| 18 September 2011; 16:33 | Long March 3B/E | F-16 | Xichang LA-2 | Successful |
| 18 September 2011; 16:33 | ChinaSat-1A | Geosynchronous transfer | | Communication |
| 29 September 2011; 13:16 | Long March 2F/G | F-08 | Jiuquan LA-4/SLS-1 | Successful |
| 29 September 2011; 13:16 | Tiangong 1 | Low Earth | | Space laboratory |
| 7 October 2011; 08:21 | Long March 3B/E | F-17 | Xichang LA-2 | Successful |
| 7 October 2011; 08:21 | Eutelsat W3C | Geosynchronous transfer | Eutelsat | Communication |
| 31 October 2011; 21:58 | Long March 2F | F-09 | Jiuquan LA-4/SLS-1 | Successful |
| 31 October 2011; 21:58 | Shenzhou 8 | Low Earth | | Technology |
| 9 November 2011; 03:21 | Long March 4B | F-15 | Taiyuan LA-9 | Successful |
| 9 November 2011; 03:21 | Yaogan 12 | Sun synchronous | | Reconnaissance |
| 9 November 2011; 03:21 | Tianxun-1 | Sun synchronous | Nanjing University of Aeronautics and Astronautics | Technology |
| 20 November 2011; 00:15 | Long March 2D | F-15 | Jiuquan LA-4/SLS-2 | Successful |
| 20 November 2011; 00:15 | Shiyan 4 | Sun synchronous | | Technology |
| 20 November 2011; 00:15 | Chuangxin-1 (03) | Sun synchronous | China Academy of Science | Technology / Communication |
| 29 November 2011; 18:50 | Long March 2C | F-33 | Taiyuan LA-9 | Successful |
| 29 November 2011; 18:50 | Yaogan 13 | Sun synchronous | | Reconnaissance |
| 1 December 2011; 21:07 | Long March 3A | F-22 | Xichang LA-3 | Successful |
| 1 December 2011; 21:07 | Compass-IGSO5 | Geosynchronous transfer | | Navigation |
| 19 December 2011; 16:41 | Long March 3B/E | F-18 | Xichang LA-2 | Successful |
| 19 December 2011; 16:41 | NIGCOMSAT-1R | Geosynchronous transfer | | Communication |
| 22 December 2011; 03:26 | Long March 4B | F-16 | Taiyuan LA-9 | Successful |
| 22 December 2011; 03:26 | Ziyuan I-02C | Sun synchronous | | Earth observation |

=== 2012 ===
| Date/time (UTC) | Rocket | Serial number | Launch site | Outcome |
|---|---|---|---|---|
| Date/time (UTC) | Payload | Separation orbit | Operator | Function |
| Date/time (UTC) | Remarks | | | |
| 9 January 2012; 03:17 | Long March 4B | F-17 | Taiyuan LA-9 | Successful |
| 9 January 2012; 03:17 | Ziyuan III-01 | Sun synchronous | CNSA | Earth observation |
| 9 January 2012; 03:17 | VesselSat-2 | Sun synchronous | Luxspace | Technology |
| 13 January 2012; 00:56 | Long March 3A | F-23 | Xichang LA-3 | Successful |
| 13 January 2012; 00:56 | Fengyun-2F | Geosynchronous transfer | | Meteorology |
| 24 February 2012; 16:12 | Long March 3C | F-08 | Xichang LA-2 | Successful |
| 24 February 2012; 16:12 | Compass-G5 | Geosynchronous transfer | | Navigation |
| 31 March 2012; 10:27 | Long March 3B/E | F-19 | Xichang LA-2 | Successful |
| 31 March 2012; 10:27 | Apstar 7 | Geosynchronous transfer | Apstar | Communication |
| 29 April 2012; 20:50 | Long March 3B | F-20 | Xichang LA-2 | Successful |
| 29 April 2012; 20:50 | Compass-M3 | Medium Earth | | Navigation |
| 29 April 2012; 20:50 | Compass-M4 | Medium Earth | | Navigation |
| 6 May 2012; 07:10 | Long March 2D | F-16 | Jiuquan LA-4/SLS-2 | Successful |
| 6 May 2012; 07:10 | Tianhui-1B | Sun synchronous | | Reconnaissance |
| 10 May 2012; 07:06 | Long March 4B | F-18 | Taiyuan LA-9 | Successful |
| 10 May 2012; 07:06 | Yaogan 14 | Sun synchronous | | Reconnaissance |
| 10 May 2012; 07:06 | Tiantuo-1 | Sun synchronous | National University of Defense Technology | Technology |
| 26 May 2012; 15:56 | Long March 3B/E | F-21 | Xichang LA-2 | Successful |
| 26 May 2012; 15:56 | Chinasat-2A | Geosynchronous transfer | | Communication |
| 29 May 2012; 07:31 | Long March 4C | F-08 | Taiyuan LA-9 | Successful |
| 29 May 2012; 07:31 | Yaogan 15 | Sun synchronous | | Reconnaissance |
| 16 June 2012; 10:37 | Long March 2F | F-10 | Jiuquan LA-4/SLS-1 | Successful |
| 16 June 2012; 10:37 | Shenzhou 9 | Low Earth | | Manned spaceflight |
| 25 July 2012; 15:43 | Long March 3C | F-09 | Xichang LA-2 | Successful |
| 25 July 2012; 15:43 | Tianlian-1C | Geosynchronous transfer | | Communication / Data transfer |
| 18 September 2012; 19:10 | Long March 3B | F-22 | Xichang LA-2 | Successful |
| 18 September 2012; 19:10 | Compass-M5 | Medium Earth | | Navigation |
| 18 September 2012; 19:10 | Compass-M6 | Medium Earth | | Navigation |
| 18 September 2012; 19:10 | Last flight of the first-generation Long March 3B, replaced by 3B/E | | | |
| 29 September 2012; 04:12 | Long March 2D | F-17 | Jiuquan LA-4/SLS-2 | Successful |
| 29 September 2012; 04:12 | Venezuela Remote Sensing Satellite | Sun synchronous | | Remote Sensing |
| 14 October 2012; 03:25 | Long March 2C / SMA | F-34 | Taiyuan LA-9 | Successful |
| 14 October 2012; 03:25 | Shijian 9A | Sun synchronous | | Technology |
| 14 October 2012; 03:25 | Shijian 9B | Sun synchronous | | Technology |
| 25 October 2012; 15:33 | Long March 3C | F-10 | Xichang LA-2 | Successful |
| 25 October 2012; 15:33 | Compass-G6 | Geosynchronous transfer | | Navigation |
| 18 November 2012; 22:53 | Long March 2C | F-35 | Taiyuan LA-9 | Successful |
| 18 November 2012; 22:53 | Huanjing 1C | Sun synchronous | | Earth Observation |
| 18 November 2012; 22:53 | Xinyan 1 | Sun synchronous | | Technology |
| 18 November 2012; 22:53 | Fengniao 1 | Sun synchronous | | Technology |
| 18 November 2012; 22:53 | Fengniao 1A | Sun synchronous | | Technology |
| 25 November 2012; 04:06 | Long March 4C | F-09 | Jiuquan LA-4/SLS-2 | Successful |
| 25 November 2012; 04:06 | Yaogan 16A | Low Earth | | Reconnaissance |
| 25 November 2012; 04:06 | Yaogan 16B | Low Earth | | Reconnaissance |
| 25 November 2012; 04:06 | Yaogan 16C | Low Earth | | Reconnaissance |
| 27 November 2012; 10:13 | Long March 3B/E | F-23 | Xichang LA-2 | Successful |
| 27 November 2012; 10:13 | Chinasat-12 | Geosynchronous transfer | | Communication |
| 18 December 2012; 16:13 | Long March 2D | F-18 | Jiuquan LA-4/SLS-2 | Successful |
| 18 December 2012; 16:13 | Göktürk-2 | Sun synchronous | | Earth Observation |

=== 2013 ===
| Date/time (UTC) | Rocket | Serial number | Launch site | Outcome |
|---|---|---|---|---|
| Date/time (UTC) | Payload | Separation orbit | Operator | Function |
| Date/time (UTC) | Remarks | | | |
| 26 April 2013; 04:13 | Long March 2D | F-19 | Jiuquan LA-4/SLS-2 | Successful |
| 26 April 2013; 04:13 | Gaofen 1 | Sun synchronous | | Earth Observation |
| 26 April 2013; 04:13 | TurkSat-3USat | Sun synchronous | | Technology |
| 26 April 2013; 04:13 | NEE-01 Pegaso | Sun synchronous | | Technology |
| 26 April 2013; 04:13 | CubeBug-1 | Sun synchronous | | Technology |
| 1 May 2013; 16:06 | Long March 3B/E | F-24 | Xichang LA-2 | Successful |
| 1 May 2013; 16:06 | Chinasat-11 | Geosynchronous transfer | | Communication |
| 11 June 2013; 09:38 | Long March 2F | F-11 | Jiuquan LA-4/SLS-1 | Successful |
| 11 June 2013; 09:38 | Shenzhou 10 | Low Earth | | Manned spaceflight |
| 15 July 2013; 09:27 | Long March 2C | F-36 | Jiuquan LA-4/SLS-2 | Successful |
| 15 July 2013; 09:27 | Shijian 11-05 | Sun synchronous | | Technology |
| 19 July 2013; 23:37 | Long March 4C | F-10 | Taiyuan LA-9 | Successful |
| 19 July 2013; 23:37 | Shijian 15 | Sun synchronous | | Technology |
| 19 July 2013; 23:37 | Shiyan 7 | Sun synchronous | | Technology |
| 19 July 2013; 23:37 | Chuangxin-3 | Sun synchronous | | Technology / Communication |
| 1 September 2013; 19:16 | Long March 4C | F-11 | Jiuquan LA-4/SLS-2 | Successful |
| 1 September 2013; 19:16 | Yaogan 17A | Low Earth | | Reconnaissance |
| 1 September 2013; 19:16 | Yaogan 17B | Low Earth | | Reconnaissance |
| 1 September 2013; 19:16 | Yaogan 17C | Low Earth | | Reconnaissance |
| 23 September 2013; 03:07 | Long March 4C | F-12 | Taiyuan LA-9 | Successful |
| 23 September 2013; 03:07 | Fengyun-3C | Sun synchronous | | Meteorology |
| 25 October 2013; 03:50 | Long March 4B | F-19 | Jiuquan LA-4/SLS-2 | Successful |
| 25 October 2013; 03:50 | Shijian 16 | Low Earth | | Technology |
| 29 October 2013; 02:50 | Long March 2C | F-37 | Taiyuan LA-9 | Successful |
| 29 October 2013; 02:50 | Yaogan 18 | Sun synchronous | | Reconnaissance |
| 20 November 2013; 03:31 | Long March 4C | F-13 | Taiyuan LA-9 | Successful |
| 20 November 2013; 03:31 | Yaogan 19 | Sun synchronous | | Reconnaissance |
| 25 November 2013; 02:12 | Long March 2D | F-20 | Jiuquan LA-4/SLS-2 | Successful |
| 25 November 2013; 02:12 | Shiyan 5 | Low Earth | | Technology |
| 1 December 2013; 17:30 | Long March 3B/E | F-25 | Xichang LA-2 | Successful |
| 1 December 2013; 17:30 | Chang'e 3 | Lunar transfer | CNSA | Lunar lander/rover |
| 9 December 2013; 03:26 | Long March 4B | F-20 | Taiyuan LA-9 | Failure |
| 9 December 2013; 03:26 | CBERS-3 | Sun synchronous (intended) | | Earth observation |
| 9 December 2013; 03:26 | Third stage engine shut down early due to duct blockage. | | | |
| 20 December 2013; 16:42 | Long March 3B/E | F-26 | Xichang LA-2 | Successful |
| 20 December 2013; 16:42 | Túpac Katari 1 | Geosynchronous transfer | | Communication |

=== 2014 ===
| Date/time (UTC) | Rocket | Serial number | Launch site | Outcome |
|---|---|---|---|---|
| Date/time (UTC) | Payload | Separation orbit | Operator | Function |
| Date/time (UTC) | Remarks | | | |
| 31 March 2014; 02:46 | Long March 2C | F-38 | Jiuquan LA-4/SLS-2 | Successful |
| 31 March 2014; 02:46 | Shijian 11-06 | Sun synchronous | | Technology |
| 9 August 2014; 05:45 | Long March 4C | F-14 | Jiuquan LA-4/SLS-2 | Successful |
| 9 August 2014; 05:45 | Yaogan 20A | Low Earth | | Reconnaissance |
| 9 August 2014; 05:45 | Yaogan 20B | Low Earth | | Reconnaissance |
| 9 August 2014; 05:45 | Yaogan 20C | Low Earth | | Reconnaissance |
| 19 August 2014; 03:15 | Long March 4B | F-21 | Taiyuan LA-9 | Successful |
| 19 August 2014; 03:15 | Gaofen 2 | Sun synchronous | | Earth Observation |
| 19 August 2014; 03:15 | BRITE-PL2 (Heweliusz) | Sun synchronous | | Astronomy |
| 4 September 2014; 00:15 | Long March 2D | F-21 | Jiuquan LA-4/SLS-2 | Successful |
| 4 September 2014; 00:15 | Chuangxin-1 (04) | Sun synchronous | China Academy of Science | Technology / Communication |
| 4 September 2014; 00:15 | Lingqiao | Sun synchronous | | Technology / Communication |
| 8 September 2014; 03:22 | Long March 4B | F-22 | Taiyuan LA-9 | Successful |
| 8 September 2014; 03:22 | Yaogan 21 | Sun synchronous | | Reconnaissance |
| 8 September 2014; 03:22 | Tiantuo-2 | Sun synchronous | National University of Defense Technology | Technology |
| 28 September 2014; 05:13 | Long March 2C | F-39 | Jiuquan LA-4/SLS-2 | Successful |
| 28 September 2014; 05:13 | Shijian 11-07 | Sun synchronous | | Technology |
| 20 October 2014; 06:31 | Long March 4C | F-15 | Taiyuan LA-9 | Successful |
| 20 October 2014; 06:31 | Yaogan 22 | Sun synchronous | | Reconnaissance |
| 23 October 2014; 18:00 | Long March 3C/E | F-11 | Xichang LA-2 | Successful |
| 23 October 2014; 18:00 | Chang'e 5-T1 | Lunar transfer | | Lunar fly-by/return vehicle technology testing |
| 27 October 2014; 06:59 | Long March 2C | F-40 | Jiuquan LA-4/SLS-2 | Successful |
| 27 October 2014; 06:59 | Shijian 11-08 | Sun synchronous | | Technology |
| 14 November 2014; 18:53 | Long March 2C | F-41 | Taiyuan LA-9 | Successful |
| 14 November 2014; 18:53 | Yaogan 23 | Sun synchronous | | Reconnaissance |
| 20 November 2014; 07:12 | Long March 2D | F-22 | Jiuquan LA-4/SLS-2 | Successful |
| 20 November 2014; 07:12 | Yaogan 24 | Sun synchronous | | Technology |
| 7 December 2014; 03:26 | Long March 4B | F-23 | Taiyuan, LA-9 | Successful |
| 7 December 2014; 03:26 | CBERS-4 | Sun synchronous | | Earth observation |
| 7 December 2014; 03:26 | The 200th launch of Long March series rocket. | | | |
| 10 December 2014; 19:33 | Long March 4C | F-16 | Jiuquan LA-4/SLS-2 | Successful |
| 10 December 2014; 19:33 | Yaogan 25A | Low Earth | | Reconnaissance |
| 10 December 2014; 19:33 | Yaogan 25B | Low Earth | | Reconnaissance |
| 10 December 2014; 19:33 | Yaogan 25C | Low Earth | | Reconnaissance |
| 27 December 2014; 03:22 | Long March 4B | F-24 | Taiyuan LA-9 | Successful |
| 27 December 2014; 03:22 | Yaogan 26 | Sun synchronous | | Reconnaissance |
| 31 December 2014; 01:02 | Long March 3A | F-24 | Xichang LA-2 | Successful |
| 31 December 2014; 01:02 | Fengyun-2G | Geosynchronous transfer | | Meteorology |

=== 2015 ===
| Date/time (UTC) | Rocket | Serial number | Launch site | Outcome |
|---|---|---|---|---|
| Date/time (UTC) | Payload | Separation orbit | Operator | Function |
| Date/time (UTC) | Remarks | | | |
| 30 March 2015; 13:52 | Long March 3C + YZ-1 | F-12 | Xichang LA-2 | Successful |
| 30 March 2015; 13:52 | BDS I1-S | Geosynchronous | | Navigation |
| 26 June 2015; 06:22 | Long March 4B | F-25 | Taiyuan LA-9 | Successful |
| 26 June 2015; 06:22 | Gaofen 8 | Sun synchronous | | Earth Observation |
| 25 July 2015; 12:29 | Long March 3B/E + YZ-1 | F-27 | Xichang LA-2 | Successful |
| 25 July 2015; 12:29 | BDS M1-S | Medium Earth | | Navigation |
| 25 July 2015; 12:29 | BDS M2-S | Medium Earth | | Navigation |
| 27 August 2015; 02:31 | Long March 4C | F-17 | Taiyuan LA-9 | Successful |
| 27 August 2015; 02:31 | Yaogan 27 | Sun synchronous | | Reconnaissance |
| 12 September 2015; 15:42 | Long March 3B/E | F-28 | Xichang LA-2 | Successful |
| 12 September 2015; 15:42 | TJS-1 | Geosynchronous | | Communication |
| 14 September 2015; 04:42 | Long March 2D | F-23 | Jiuquan LA-4/SLS-2 | Successful |
| 14 September 2015; 04:42 | Gaofen 9 | Sun synchronous | | Earth Observation |
| 19 September 2015; 23:01 | Long March 6 | F-01 | Taiyuan LA-16 | Successful |
| 19 September 2015; 23:01 | Xiwang-2A | Sun synchronous | | Technology |
| 19 September 2015; 23:01 | Xiwang-2B | Sun synchronous | | Technology |
| 19 September 2015; 23:01 | Xiwang-2C | Sun synchronous | | Technology |
| 19 September 2015; 23:01 | Xiwang-2D | Sun synchronous | | Technology |
| 19 September 2015; 23:01 | Xiwang-2E | Sun synchronous | | Technology |
| 19 September 2015; 23:01 | Xiwang-2F | Sun synchronous | | Technology |
| 19 September 2015; 23:01 | ZDPS-2A | Sun synchronous | | Technology |
| 19 September 2015; 23:01 | ZDPS-2B | Sun synchronous | | Technology |
| 19 September 2015; 23:01 | NS-2 | Sun synchronous | | Technology |
| 19 September 2015; 23:01 | ZJ-1 | Sun synchronous | | Technology |
| 19 September 2015; 23:01 | ZJ-2 | Sun synchronous | | Technology |
| 19 September 2015; 23:01 | Tiantuo 3 | Sun synchronous | | Technology |
| 19 September 2015; 23:01 | NUDT-Phone-Sat | Sun synchronous | | Technology |
| 19 September 2015; 23:01 | Xingchen 1 | Sun synchronous | | Technology |
| 19 September 2015; 23:01 | Xingchen 2 | Sun synchronous | | Technology |
| 19 September 2015; 23:01 | Xingchen 3 | Sun synchronous | | Technology |
| 19 September 2015; 23:01 | Xingchen 4 | Sun synchronous | | Technology |
| 19 September 2015; 23:01 | LilacSat 2 | Sun synchronous | | Technology |
| 19 September 2015; 23:01 | XY-2 | Sun synchronous | | Technology |
| 19 September 2015; 23:01 | DCBB | Sun synchronous | | Technology |
| 19 September 2015; 23:01 | First flight of the Long March 6 launch vehicle | | | |
| 25 September 2015; 01:41 | Long March 11 | F-01 | Jiuquan | Successful |
| 25 September 2015; 01:41 | Pujiang 1 | Sun synchronous | | Technology |
| 25 September 2015; 01:41 | STU-2A | Sun synchronous | | Technology |
| 25 September 2015; 01:41 | STU-2B | Sun synchronous | | Technology |
| 25 September 2015; 01:41 | STU-2C | Sun synchronous | | Technology |
| 25 September 2015; 01:41 | First flight of the Long March 11 launch vehicle | | | |
| 29 September 2015; 23:13 | Long March 3B/E | F-29 | Xichang LA-3 | Successful |
| 29 September 2015; 23:13 | BDS I2-S | Geosynchronous | | Navigation |
| 7 October 2015; 04:13 | Long March 2D | F-24 | Jiuquan LA-4/SLS-2 | Successful |
| 7 October 2015; 04:13 | Jilin-1A | Sun synchronous | Chang Guang Satellite Technology | Earth Observation |
| 7 October 2015; 04:13 | Jilin-1B | Sun synchronous | Chang Guang Satellite Technology | Earth Observation |
| 7 October 2015; 04:13 | Jilin-1C | Sun synchronous | Chang Guang Satellite Technology | Earth Observation |
| 7 October 2015; 04:13 | Jilin-1D | Sun synchronous | Chang Guang Satellite Technology | Earth Observation |
| 16 October 2015; 16:16 | Long March 3B/E | F-30 | Xichang LA-2 | Successful |
| 16 October 2015; 16:16 | Apstar 9 | Geosynchronous | Apstar | Communication |
| 26 October 2015; 07:10 | Long March 2D | F-25 | Jiuquan LA-4/SLS-2 | Successful |
| 26 October 2015; 07:10 | Tianhui-1C | Sun synchronous | | Reconnaissance |
| 3 November 2015; 16:25 | Long March 3B/E | F-31 | Xichang LA-3 | Successful |
| 3 November 2015; 16:25 | Chinasat-2C | Geosynchronous transfer | | Communication |
| 8 November 2015; 07:06 | Long March 4B | F-26 | Taiyuan LA-9 | Successful |
| 8 November 2015; 07:06 | Yaogan 28 | Sun synchronous | | Reconnaissance |
| 20 November 2015; 16:07 | Long March 3B/E | F-32 | Xichang LA-2 | Successful |
| 20 November 2015; 16:07 | LaoSat-1 | Geosynchronous transfer | | Communication |
| 26 November 2015; 21:24 | Long March 4C | F-18 | Taiyuan LA-9 | Successful |
| 26 November 2015; 21:24 | Yaogan 29 | Sun synchronous | | Reconnaissance |
| 9 December 2015; 16:46 | Long March 3B/E | F-33 | Xichang LA-3 | Successful |
| 9 December 2015; 16:46 | ChinaSat-1C | Geosynchronous transfer | | Communication |
| 17 December 2015; 00:12 | Long March 2D | F-26 | Jiuquan LA-4/SLS-2 | Successful |
| 17 December 2015; 00:12 | DAMPE | Sun synchronous | | Cosmology research |
| 28 December 2015; 16:04 | Long March 3B/E | F-34 | Xichang LA-2 | Successful |
| 28 December 2015; 16:04 | Gaofen 4 | Geosynchronous transfer | | Earth observation |

=== 2016 ===
| Date/time (UTC) | Rocket | Serial number | Launch site | Outcome |
|---|---|---|---|---|
| Date/time (UTC) | Payload | Separation orbit | Operator | Function |
| Date/time (UTC) | Remarks | | | |
| 15 January 2016; 16:57 | Long March 3B/E | F-35 | Xichang, LA-3 | Successful |
| 15 January 2016; 16:57 | Belintersat-1 | Geostationary transfer | | Communication |
| 1 February 2016; 07:29 | Long March 3C + YZ-1 | F-13 | Xichang, LA-2 | Successful |
| 1 February 2016; 07:29 | BeiDou M3-S | Geostationary | | Navigation |
| 29 March 2016; 20:11 | Long March 3A | F-25 | Xichang, LA-2 | Successful |
| 29 March 2016; 20:11 | Compass-IGSO6 | Geostationary transfer | | Navigation |
| 5 April 2016; 17:38 | Long March 2D | F-27 | Jiuquan, LA-4/SLS-2 | Successful |
| 5 April 2016; 17:38 | Shijian 10 | Low Earth | | Microgravity research |
| 15 May 2016; 02:43 | Long March 2D | F-28 | Jiuquan, LA-4/SLS-2 | Successful |
| 15 May 2016; 02:43 | Yaogan 30 | Sun-synchronous | | Reconnaissance |
| 30 May 2016; 03:17 | Long March 4B | F-27 | Taiyuan, LA-9 | Successful |
| 30 May 2016; 03:17 | Ziyuan III-02 | Sun-synchronous | | Earth observation |
| 30 May 2016; 03:17 | ÑuSat-1 | Sun-synchronous | Satellogic | Earth imaging |
| 30 May 2016; 03:17 | ÑuSat-2 | Sun-synchronous | Satellogic | Earth imaging |
| 12 June 2016; 15:30 | Long March 3C | F-14 | Xichang, LA-3 | Successful |
| 12 June 2016; 15:30 | Compass-G7 | Geosynchronous transfer | | Navigation |
| 25 June 2016; 12:00 | Long March 7 + YZ-1A | F-01 | Wenchang, LA-2 | Successful |
| 25 June 2016; 12:00 | Next Generation Crewed Capsule Prototype | Low Earth | | Technical Demonstration |
| 25 June 2016; 12:00 | Star of Aoxiang | Low Earth | | Technology |
| 25 June 2016; 12:00 | Aolong-1 | Low Earth | | Technology |
| 25 June 2016; 12:00 | Tiange-1 | Low Earth | | Technology |
| 25 June 2016; 12:00 | Tiange-2 | Low Earth | | Technology |
| 25 June 2016; 12:00 | First flight of the Long March 7 launch vehicle and first launch from the Wenchang Satellite Launch Center | | | |
| 29 June 2016; 03:21 | Long March 4B | F-28 | Jiuquan, LA-4/SLS-2 | Successful |
| 29 June 2016; 03:21 | Shijian 16-02 | Low Earth | | Technology |
| 5 August 2016; 16:22 | Long March 3B/E | F-36 | Xichang, LA-3 | Successful |
| 5 August 2016; 16:22 | Tiantong-1-01 | Geosynchronous transfer | | Communication |
| 9 August 2016; 22:55 | Long March 4C | F-19 | Taiyuan, LA-9 | Successful |
| 9 August 2016; 22:55 | Gaofen 3 | Sun-synchronous | | Earth Observation |
| 15 August 2016; 17:40 | Long March 2D | F-29 | Jiuquan, LA-4/SLS-2 | Successful |
| 15 August 2016; 17:40 | QUESS | Sun-synchronous | CNSA | Quantum communications |
| 31 August 2016; 18:55 | Long March 4C | F-20 | Taiyuan, LA-9 | Failure |
| 31 August 2016; 18:55 | Gaofen 10 | Sun-synchronous | | Earth Observation |
| 31 August 2016; 18:55 | Cause of failure unknown. | | | |
| 15 September 2016; 14:04 | Long March 2F/G | F-12 | Jiuquan, LA-4/SLS-1 | Successful |
| 15 September 2016; 14:04 | Tiangong-2 | Low Earth | | Space laboratory |
| 16 October 2016; 23:30 | Long March 2F | F-13 | Jiuquan, LA-4/SLS-1 | Successful |
| 16 October 2016; 23:30 | Shenzhou 11 | Low Earth | | Manned spaceflight |
| 3 November 2016; 12:43 | Long March 5 + YZ-2 | F-01 | Wenchang, LA-1 | Successful |
| 3 November 2016; 12:43 | Shijian 17 | Geosynchronous transfer | | Communication |
| 3 November 2016; 12:43 | First flight of the Long March 5 launch vehicle. Second stage anomaly placed the stack into lower than planned orbit, but third stage had enough margin to make up the performance shortfall. | | | |
| 9 November 2016; 23:42 | Long March 11 | F-02 | Jiuquan | Successful |
| 9 November 2016; 23:42 | XPNAV-1 | Sun-synchronous | | Technology |
| 11 November 2016; 23:14 | Long March 2D | F-30 | Jiuquan, LA-4/SLS-2 | Successful |
| 11 November 2016; 23:14 | Yunhai-1-01 | Sun-synchronous | | Meteorology research |
| 22 November 2016; 15:24 | Long March 3C/E | F-15 | Xichang, LA-2 | Successful |
| 22 November 2016; 15:24 | Tianlian I-04 | Geosynchronous transfer | | Communication / Data transfer |
| 10 December 2016; 16:11 | Long March 3B/E | F-37 | Xichang, LA-3 | Successful |
| 10 December 2016; 16:11 | Fengyun-4A | Geostationary transfer | | Meteorology |
| 21 December 2016; 19:22 | Long March 2D | F-31 | Jiuquan, LA-4/SLS-2 | Successful |
| 21 December 2016; 19:22 | TanSat | Sun-synchronous | | Atmospheric research |
| 28 December 2016; 03:23 | Long March 2D | F-32 | Taiyuan, LA-9 | Partial failure |
| 28 December 2016; 03:23 | SuperView-1 01 | Sun-synchronous | | Earth observation |
| 28 December 2016; 03:23 | SuperView-1 02 | Sun-synchronous | | Earth observation |
| 28 December 2016; 03:23 | BY70-1 | Sun-synchronous | | Technology |
| 28 December 2016; 03:23 | Satellites deployed in lower than planned orbit. The SuperView satellites used their own propulsion systems to raise their orbit. The BY70-1 CubeSat reentered on 18 February 2017. | | | |

=== 2017 ===
| Date/time (UTC) | Rocket | Serial number | Launch site | Outcome |
|---|---|---|---|---|
| Date/time (UTC) | Payload | Separation orbit | Operator | Function |
| Date/time (UTC) | Remarks | | | |
| 5 January 2017; 15:18 | Long March 3B/E | F-38 | Xichang, LA-2 | Successful |
| 5 January 2017; 15:18 | TJS-2 | Geosynchronous | | Communication |
| 12 April 2017; 11:04 | Long March 3B/E | F-39 | Xichang, LA-2 | Successful |
| 12 April 2017; 11:04 | Shijian 13 | Geosynchronous | | Communication |
| 20 April 2017; 11:41 | Long March 7 | F-02 | Wenchang, LA-2 | Successful |
| 20 April 2017; 11:41 | Tianzhou 1 | Low Earth | | Space Station Logistics |
| 15 June 2017; 03:00 | Long March 4B | F-31 | Jiuquan, LA-4/SLS-2 | Successful |
| 15 June 2017; 03:00 | HXMT | Low Earth | CNSA | X-ray Astronomical Telescope |
| 15 June 2017; 03:00 | Zhuhai-1 A/B | Low Earth | | Earth observation |
| 15 June 2017; 03:00 | ÑuSat-3 | Low Earth | | Earth observation |
| 18 June 2017; 16:11 | Long March 3B/E | F-40 | Xichang, LA-2 | Partial failure |
| 18 June 2017; 16:11 | Chinasat 9A | Geosynchronous transfer | China Satellite Communications | Communication |
| 18 June 2017; 16:11 | Satellite deployed in lower than planned orbit due to attitude control anomaly in third stage during coast phase. Chinasat 9A reached geosynchronous orbit on 13 July 2017, after maneuvering with its own propulsion system. | | | |
| 2 July 2017; 11:23 | Long March 5 | F-02 | Wenchang, LA-1 | Failure |
| 2 July 2017; 11:23 | Shijian 18 | Geosynchronous transfer (intended) | | Communication |
| 2 July 2017; 11:23 | First stage one engine failure at T+346 seconds due to thermal conditions problem resulting burn-through. | | | |
| 29 September 2017; 04:21 | Long March 2C | F-42 | Xichang, LA-3 | Successful |
| 29 September 2017; 04:21 | Yaogan 30-01 A/B/C | Low Earth | | Probable Sigint |
| 9 October 2017; 04:13 | Long March 2D | F-33 | Jiuquan, LA-4/SLS-2 | Successful |
| 9 October 2017; 04:13 | VRSS-2 | Sun-synchronous | | Remote Sensing |
| 5 November 2017; 11:45 | Long March 3B/E + YZ-1 | F-41 | Xichang, LA-2 | Successful |
| 5 November 2017; 11:45 | BeiDou-3 M1 | Medium Earth | | Navigation |
| 5 November 2017; 11:45 | BeiDou-3 M2 | Medium Earth | | Navigation |
| 14 November 2017; 18:35 | Long March 4C | F-21 | Taiyuan, LA-9 | Successful |
| 14 November 2017; 18:35 | Fengyun 3D | Sun-synchronous | | Meteorology |
| 14 November 2017; 18:35 | HEAD-1 | Sun-synchronous | | Remote sensing |
| 21 November 2017; 04:50 | Long March 6 | F-02 | Taiyuan, LA-16 | Successful |
| 21 November 2017; 04:50 | Jilin-1 04 | Sun-synchronous | Chang Guang Satellite Technology | Earth observation |
| 21 November 2017; 04:50 | Jilin-1 05 | Sun-synchronous | Chang Guang Satellite Technology | Earth observation |
| 21 November 2017; 04:50 | Jilin-1 06 | Sun-synchronous | Chang Guang Satellite Technology | Earth observation |
| 24 November 2017; 18:10 | Long March 2C | F-43 | Xichang, LA-3 | Successful |
| 24 November 2017; 18:10 | Yaogan 30-02A/B/C | Low Earth | | Probable Sigint |
| 3 December 2017; 04:11 | Long March 2D | F-34 | Jiuquan, LA-4/SLS-2 | Successful |
| 3 December 2017; 04:11 | LKW-1 | Sun-synchronous | | Reconnaissance |
| 10 December 2017; 16:40 | Long March 3B/E | F-42 | Xichang, LA-2 | Successful |
| 10 December 2017; 16:40 | Alcomsat-1 | Geosynchronous transfer | Algerian Space Agency | Communication |
| 23 December 2017; 04:14 | Long March 2D | F-35 | Jiuquan, LA-4/SLS-2 | Successful |
| 23 December 2017; 04:14 | LKW-2 | Sun-synchronous | | Reconnaissance |
| 25 December 2017; 19:44 | Long March 2C | F-44 | Xichang, LA-3 | Successful |
| 25 December 2017; 19:44 | Yaogan 30-03A/B/C | Low Earth | | Probable Sigint |

=== 2018 ===
| Date/time (UTC) | Rocket | Serial number | Launch site | Outcome |
|---|---|---|---|---|
| Date/time (UTC) | Payload | Separation orbit | Operator | Function |
| Date/time (UTC) | Remarks | | | |
| 9 January 2018; 03:24 | Long March 2D | F-36 | Taiyuan, LA-9 | Successful |
| 9 January 2018; 03:24 | SuperView-1 03 | Sun-synchronous | | Earth observation |
| 9 January 2018; 03:24 | SuperView-1 04 | Sun-synchronous | | Earth observation |
| 11 January 2018; 23:18 | Long March 3B/E + YZ-1 | F-43 | Xichang, LA-2 | Successful |
| 11 January 2018; 23:18 | BeiDou-3 M7 | Medium Earth | | Navigation |
| 11 January 2018; 23:18 | BeiDou-3 M8 | Medium Earth | | Navigation |
| 13 January 2018; 07:10 | Long March 2D | F-37 | Jiuquan, LA-4/SLS-2 | Successful |
| 13 January 2018; 07:10 | LKW-3 | Sun-synchronous | | Reconnaissance |
| 19 January 2018; 04:12 | Long March 11 | F-03 | Jiuquan | Successful |
| 19 January 2018; 04:12 | Jilin-1 07 | Sun-synchronous | Chang Guang Satellite Technology | Earth Observation |
| 19 January 2018; 04:12 | Jilin-1 08 | Sun-synchronous | Chang Guang Satellite Technology | Earth Observation |
| 19 January 2018; 04:12 | Tianyi-2 | Sun-synchronous | Chang Guang Satellite Technology | Technology |
| 19 January 2018; 04:12 | Tianyi-6 | Sun-synchronous | Chang Guang Satellite Technology | Technology |
| 19 January 2018; 04:12 | Hui'an-1 | Sun-synchronous | Chang Guang Satellite Technology | Technology |
| 19 January 2018; 04:12 | KIPP 1 | Sun-synchronous | Chang Guang Satellite Technology | Technology |
| 25 January 2018; 05:39 | Long March 2C | F-45 | Xichang, LA-3 | Successful |
| 25 January 2018; 05:39 | Yaogan 30-04A/B/C | Low Earth | | Probable Sigint |
| 2 February 2018; 07:51 | Long March 2D | F-38 | Jiuquan, LA-4/SLS-2 | Successful |
| 2 February 2018; 07:51 | CSES (Zhangheng 1) | Sun-synchronous | | Earth Science/Ionosphere research |
| 12 February 2018; 05:03 | Long March 3B/E + YZ-1 | F-44 | Xichang, LA-2 | Successful |
| 12 February 2018; 05:03 | BeiDou-3 M3 | Medium Earth | | Navigation |
| 12 February 2018; 05:03 | BeiDou-3 M4 | Medium Earth | | Navigation |
| 17 March 2018; 07:10 | Long March 2D | F-39 | Jiuquan, LA-4/SLS-2 | Successful |
| 17 March 2018; 07:10 | LKW-4 | Sun synchronous | | Reconnaissance |
| 29 March 2018; 17:56 | Long March 3B/E + YZ-1 | F-45 | Xichang, LA-2 | Successful |
| 29 March 2018; 17:56 | BeiDou-3 M9 | Medium Earth | | Navigation |
| 29 March 2018; 17:56 | BeiDou-3 M10 | Medium Earth | | Navigation |
| 31 March 2018; 03:22 | Long March 4C | F-22 | Taiyuan LA-9 | Successful |
| 31 March 2018; 03:22 | Gaofen-1 02 | Sun-synchronous | | Earth Observation |
| 31 March 2018; 03:22 | Gaofen-1 03 | Sun-synchronous | | Earth Observation |
| 31 March 2018; 03:22 | Gaofen-1 04 | Sun-synchronous | | Earth Observation |
| 10 April 2018; 04:25 | Long March 4C | F-23 | Jiuquan, LA-4/SLS-2 | Successful |
| 10 April 2018; 04:25 | Yaogan 31-01A | Low Earth | | Probable Sigint |
| 10 April 2018; 04:25 | Yaogan 31-01B | Low Earth | | Probable Sigint |
| 10 April 2018; 04:25 | Yaogan 31-01C | Low Earth | | Probable Sigint |
| 26 April 2018; 04:42 | Long March 11 | F-04 | Jiuquan | Successful |
| 26 April 2018; 04:42 | Zhuhai-1 OVS-2A | Sun synchronous | | Earth observation |
| 26 April 2018; 04:42 | Zhuhai-1 OHS-2A | Sun synchronous | | Earth observation |
| 26 April 2018; 04:42 | Zhuhai-1 OHS-2B | Sun synchronous | | Earth observation |
| 26 April 2018; 04:42 | Zhuhai-1 OHS-2C | Sun synchronous | | Earth observation |
| 26 April 2018; 04:42 | Zhuhai-1 OHS-2D | Sun synchronous | | Earth observation |
| 3 May 2018; 16:06 | Long March 3B/E | F-46 | Xichang, LA-2 | Successful |
| 3 May 2018; 16:06 | Apstar 6C | Geosynchronous transfer | APT Satellite Holdings | Communication |
| 8 May 2018; 18:28 | Long March 4C | F-24 | Taiyuan, LA-9 | Successful |
| 8 May 2018; 18:28 | Gaofen 5 | Sun-synchronous | | Earth Observation |
| 20 May 2018; 21:28 | Long March 4C | F-25 | Xichang, LA-3 | Successful |
| 20 May 2018; 21:28 | Chang'e 4 Relay | Earth–Moon L2, halo orbit | CNSA | Communication |
| 20 May 2018; 21:28 | DSLWP-A1 | Selenocentric, elliptical orbit | | Radio astronomy |
| 20 May 2018; 21:28 | DSLWP-A2 | Selenocentric, elliptical orbit | | Radio astronomy |
| 2 June 2018; 04:13 | Long March 2D | F-40 | Jiuquan, LA-4/SLS-2 | Successful |
| 2 June 2018; 04:13 | Gaofen 6 | Sun-synchronous | | Earth Observation |
| 2 June 2018; 04:13 | Luojia 1-01 | Sun-synchronous | | Technology |
| 5 June 2018; 13:07 | Long March 3A | F-26 | Xichang, LA-2 | Successful |
| 5 June 2018; 13:07 | Fengyun-2H | Geosynchronous transfer | | Meteorology |
| 27 June 2018; 03:30 | Long March 2C | F-46 | Xichang, LA-3 | Successful |
| 27 June 2018; 03:30 | XJSS A | Low Earth | | Technology |
| 27 June 2018; 03:30 | XJSS B | Low Earth | | Technology |
| 9 July 2018; 03:56 | Long March 2C / SMA | F-47 | Jiuquan LA-4/SLS-2 | Successful |
| 9 July 2018; 03:56 | Pakistan Remote Sensing Satellite (PRSS-1) | Sun-synchronous | | Earth Observation |
| 9 July 2018; 03:56 | PakTES-1A | Sun-synchronous | | Technology |
| 9 July 2018; 20:58 | Long March 3A | F-27 | Xichang, LA-2 | Successful |
| 9 July 2018; 20:58 | Compass-IGSO7 | Geosynchronous transfer | | Navigation |
| 29 July 2018; 01:48 | Long March 3B/E + YZ-1 | F-47 | Xichang, LA-3 | Successful |
| 29 July 2018; 01:48 | BeiDou-3 M5 | Medium Earth | | Navigation |
| 29 July 2018; 01:48 | BeiDou-3 M6 | Medium Earth | | Navigation |
| 31 July 2018; 03:00 | Long March 4B | F-30 | Taiyuan, LA-9 | Successful |
| 31 July 2018; 03:00 | Gaofen 11 | Sun synchronous | | Earth Observation |
| 24 August 2018; 23:52 | Long March 3B/E + YZ-1 | F-48 | Xichang, LA-3 | Successful |
| 24 August 2018; 23:52 | BeiDou-3 M11 | Medium Earth | | Navigation |
| 24 August 2018; 23:52 | BeiDou-3 M12 | Medium Earth | | Navigation |
| 7 September 2018; 03:15 | Long March 2C | F-48 | Taiyuan, LA-9 | Successful |
| 7 September 2018; 03:15 | Haiyang-1C | Sun-synchronous | | Ocean observation |
| 19 September 2018; 14:07 | Long March 3B/E + YZ-1 | F-49 | Xichang, LA-3 | Successful |
| 19 September 2018; 14:07 | BeiDou-3 M13 | Medium Earth | | Navigation |
| 19 September 2018; 14:07 | BeiDou-3 M14 | Medium Earth | | Navigation |
| 9 October 2018; 02:43 | Long March 2C + YZ-1S | F-49 | Jiuquan, LA-4/SLS-2 | Successful |
| 9 October 2018; 02:43 | Yaogan 32-01A | Sun-synchronous | | Probable Sigint |
| 9 October 2018; 02:43 | Yaogan 32-01B | Sun-synchronous | | Probable Sigint |
| 15 October 2018; 04:23 | Long March 3B/E + YZ-1 | F-50 | Xichang, LA-3 | Successful |
| 15 October 2018; 04:23 | BeiDou-3 M15 | Medium Earth | | Navigation |
| 15 October 2018; 04:23 | BeiDou-3 M16 | Medium Earth | | Navigation |
| 24 October 2018; 22:57 | Long March 4B | F-31 | Taiyuan, LA-9 | Successful |
| 24 October 2018; 22:57 | Haiyang-2B | Sun-synchronous | | Ocean observation |
| 29 October 2018; 00:43 | Long March 2C | F-50 | Jiuquan, LA-4/SLS-2 | Successful |
| 29 October 2018; 00:43 | CFOSAT | Sun synchronous | CNSA/CNES | Ocean observation |
| 1 November 2018; 15:57 | Long March 3B/E | F-51 | Xichang, LA-2 | Successful |
| 1 November 2018; 15:57 | BeiDou-3 G1 | Geosynchronous transfer | | Navigation |
| 18 November 2018; 18:07 | Long March 3B/E + YZ-1 | F-52 | Xichang, LA-3 | Successful |
| 18 November 2018; 18:07 | Beidou-3 M17 | Medium Earth | | Navigation |
| 18 November 2018; 18:07 | BeiDou-3 M18 | Medium Earth | | Navigation |
| 19 November 2018; 23:40 | Long March 2D | F-41 | Jiuquan, LA-4/SLS-2 | Successful |
| 19 November 2018; 23:40 | Shiyan 6 | Sun-synchronous | | Technology |
| 19 November 2018; 23:40 | Jiading 1 | Sun-synchronous | | Technology |
| 19 November 2018; 23:40 | Tianzhi-1 | Sun-synchronous | | Technology |
| 7 December 2018; 04:12 | Long March 2D | F-42 | Jiuquan, LA-4/SLS-2 | Successful |
| 7 December 2018; 04:12 | SaudiSat 5A | Sun-synchronous | | Earth Observation |
| 7 December 2018; 04:12 | SaudiSat 5B | Sun-synchronous | | Earth Observation |
| 7 December 2018; 18:23 | Long March 3B/E | F-53 | Xichang, LA-2 | Successful |
| 7 December 2018; 18:23 | Chang'e 4 | Lunar transfer | CNSA | Lunar lander/rover |
| 21 December 2018; 23:51 | Long March 11 | F-05 | Jiuquan | Successful |
| 21 December 2018; 23:51 | Hongyun-1 | Sun-synchronous | | Communication |
| 24 December 2018; 16:53 | Long March 3C/E | F-16 | Xichang, LA-3 | Successful |
| 24 December 2018; 16:53 | TJS-3 | Geosynchronous transfer | | Communication |
| 29 December 2018; 08:00 | Long March 2D + YZ-3 | F-43 | Jiuquan, LA-4/SLS-2 | Successful |
| 29 December 2018; 08:00 | Yunhai-2 01-06 | Low Earth | | Earth Observation |
| 29 December 2018; 08:00 | Hongyan-1 | Low Earth | | Communication |

=== 2019 ===
| Date/time (UTC) | Rocket | Serial number | Launch site | Outcome |
|---|---|---|---|---|
| Date/time (UTC) | Payload | Separation orbit | Operator | Function |
| Date/time (UTC) | Remarks | | | |
| 10 January 2019; 17:11 | Long March 3B/E | F-54 | Xichang, LA-2 | Successful |
| 10 January 2019; 17:11 | Chinasat-2D | Geosynchronous transfer | | Communication |
| 21 January 2019; 05:42 | Long March 11 | F-06 | Jiuquan | Successful |
| 21 January 2019; 05:42 | Jilin-1 Hyperspectral 01 | Sun-synchronous | Chang Guang Satellite Technology | Earth Observation |
| 21 January 2019; 05:42 | Jilin-1 Hyperspectral 02 | Sun-synchronous | Chang Guang Satellite Technology | Earth Observation |
| 9 March 2019; 16:28 | Long March 3B/E | F-55 | Xichang, LA-3 | Successful |
| 9 March 2019; 16:28 | Chinasat-6C | Geosynchronous transfer | | Communication |
| 9 March 2019; 16:28 | The 300th launch of Long March series rocket. | | | |
| 31 March 2019; 15:51 | Long March 3B/E | F-56 | Xichang, LA-2 | Successful |
| 31 March 2019; 15:51 | Tianlian 2-01 | Geosynchronous transfer | | Communication / Data transfer |
| 20 April 2019; 14:41 | Long March 3B/E | F-57 | Xichang, LA-3 | Successful |
| 20 April 2019; 14:41 | BeiDou-3 I1 | Geosynchronous transfer | | Navigation |
| 29 April 2019; 22:52 | Long March 4B | F-32 | Taiyuan, LA-9 | Successful |
| 29 April 2019; 22:52 | Tianhui-2-01A | Sun-synchronous | | Earth observation |
| 29 April 2019; 22:52 | Tianhui-2-01B | Sun-synchronous | | Earth observation |
| 17 May 2019; 15:48 | Long March 3C | F-17 | Xichang, LA-2 | Successful |
| 17 May 2019; 15:48 | Compass-G8 | Geosynchronous transfer | | Navigation |
| 22 May 2019; 22:49 | Long March 4C | F-26 | Taiyuan LA-9 | Failure |
| 22 May 2019; 22:49 | Yaogan-33 | Sun-synchronous | | Reconnaissance |
| 22 May 2019; 22:49 | Third stage problem, failed to reach orbit | | | |
| 5 June 2019; 04:06 | Long March 11 | F-07 | Special converted barge, Yellow Sea (34.90° N, 121.19° E) | Successful |
| 5 June 2019; 04:06 | Bufeng-1A | Low Earth | | Earth Observation |
| 5 June 2019; 04:06 | Bufeng-1B | Low Earth | | Earth Observation |
| 5 June 2019; 04:06 | Jilin-1 High Resolution 03A | Low Earth | Chang Guang Satellite Technology | Earth Observation |
| 5 June 2019; 04:06 | Xiaoxiang-1-04 | Low Earth | | Earth Observation |
| 5 June 2019; 04:06 | Tianqi-3 | Low Earth | | Technology |
| 5 June 2019; 04:06 | Tianxiang-1A | Low Earth | | Technology |
| 5 June 2019; 04:06 | Tianxiang-1B | Low Earth | | Technology |
| 5 June 2019; 04:06 | First Chinese satellite launch from a sea-based platform | | | |
| 24 June 2019; 18:09 | Long March 3B/E | F-58 | Xichang, LA-3 | Successful |
| 24 June 2019; 18:09 | BeiDou-3 I2 | Geosynchronous transfer | | Navigation |
| 26 July 2019; 03:57 | Long March 2C | F-51 | Xichang, LA-3 | Successful |
| 26 July 2019; 03:57 | Yaogan 30-05A | Low Earth | | Probable Sigint |
| 26 July 2019; 03:57 | Yaogan 30-05B | Low Earth | | Probable Sigint |
| 26 July 2019; 03:57 | Yaogan 30-05C | Low Earth | | Probable Sigint |
| 26 July 2019; 03:57 | Grid fins located on the interstage of the rocket are being used to test first stage landing zone control and recovery technologies. | | | |
| 19 August 2019; 12:03 | Long March 3B/E | F-59 | Xichang, LA-2 | Successful |
| 19 August 2019; 12:03 | ChinaSat 18 | Geosynchronous transfer | | Communication |
| 19 August 2019; 12:03 | Satellite (valued US$250 million) malfunctioned and has been declared by the Chinese government a total loss after separating from launch vehicle. | | | |
| 12 September 2019; 03:26 | Long March 4B | F-33 | Taiyuan, LA-9 | Successful |
| 12 September 2019; 03:26 | Ziyuan I-02D | Sun-synchronous | | Earth observation |
| 19 September 2019; 06:42 | Long March 11 | F-08 | Jiuquan | Successful |
| 19 September 2019; 06:42 | Zhuhai-1 OVS-3A | Sun-synchronous | | Earth observation |
| 19 September 2019; 06:42 | Zhuhai-1 OHS-3A | Sun-synchronous | | Earth observation |
| 19 September 2019; 06:42 | Zhuhai-1 OHS-3B | Sun-synchronous | | Earth observation |
| 19 September 2019; 06:42 | Zhuhai-1 OHS-3C | Sun-synchronous | | Earth observation |
| 19 September 2019; 06:42 | Zhuhai-1 OHS-3D | Sun-synchronous | | Earth observation |
| 22 September 2019; 21:10 | Long March 3B/E + YZ-1 | F-60 | Xichang, LA-2 | Successful |
| 22 September 2019; 21:10 | BeiDou-3 M23 | Medium Earth | | Navigation |
| 22 September 2019; 21:10 | BeiDou-3 M24 | Medium Earth | | Navigation |
| 25 September 2019; 00:54 | Long March 2D | F-44 | Jiuquan, LA-4/SLS-2 | Successful |
| 25 September 2019; 00:54 | Yunhai-1-02 | Sun-synchronous | | Meteorology research |
| 4 October 2019; 18:51 | Long March 4C | F-27 | Taiyuan, LA-9 | Successful |
| 4 October 2019; 18:51 | Gaofen 10-2 | Sun-synchronous | | Earth Observation |
| 17 October 2019; 15:21 | Long March 3B/E | F-61 | Xichang, LA-3 | Successful |
| 17 October 2019; 15:21 | TJS-4 | Geosynchronous | | Communication |
| 3 November 2019; 03:22 | Long March 4B | F-34 | Taiyuan, LA-9 | Successful |
| 3 November 2019; 03:22 | Gaofen 7 | Sun-synchronous | | Earth observation |
| 4 November 2019; 17:43 | Long March 3B/E | F-62 | Xichang, LA-2 | Successful |
| 4 November 2019; 17:43 | BeiDou-3 I3 | Geosynchronous transfer | | Navigation |
| 13 November 2019; 06:35 | Long March 6 | F-03 | Taiyuan, LA-16 | Successful |
| 13 November 2019; 06:35 | Ningxia-1 01 | Low Earth | | Remote sensing |
| 13 November 2019; 06:35 | Ningxia-1 02 | Low Earth | | Remote sensing |
| 13 November 2019; 06:35 | Ningxia-1 03 | Low Earth | | Remote sensing |
| 13 November 2019; 06:35 | Ningxia-1 04 | Low Earth | | Remote sensing |
| 13 November 2019; 06:35 | Ningxia-1 05 | Low Earth | | Remote sensing |
| 23 November 2019; 00:55 | Long March 3B/E + YZ-1 | F-63 | Xichang, LA-3 | Successful |
| 23 November 2019; 00:55 | BeiDou-3 M21 | Medium Earth | | Navigation |
| 23 November 2019; 00:55 | BeiDou-3-3 M22 | Medium Earth | | Navigation |
| 27 November 2019; 23:52 | Long March 4C | F-28 | Taiyuan, LA-9 | Successful |
| 27 November 2019; 23:52 | Gaofen 12 | Sun-synchronous | | Earth observation |
| 16 December 2019; 07:22 | Long March 3B/E + YZ-1 | F-64 | Xichang, LA-3 | Successful |
| 16 December 2019; 07:22 | BeiDou-3 M19 | Medium Earth | | Navigation |
| 16 December 2019; 07:22 | Beidou M20 | Medium Earth | | Navigation |
| 20 December 2019; 03:22 | Long March 4B | F-35 | Taiyuan, LA-9 | Successful |
| 20 December 2019; 03:22 | CBERS-4A | Sun-synchronous | | Earth observation |
| 20 December 2019; 03:22 | ETRSS-1 | Sun-synchronous | | Earth observation |
| 27 December 2019; 12:45 | Long March 5 | F-03 | Wenchang, LA-1 | Successful |
| 27 December 2019; 12:45 | Shijian 20 | Geosynchronous transfer | | Communication |

== Sources ==
- McDowell, Jonathan. "Launch Log". Jonathan's Space Page.
- McDowell, Jonathan. "Satellite Catalog". Jonathan's Space Page.
- Krebs, Gunter. "DF-5 family".
