= List of Long March launches (2000–2009) =

This is a list of launches made by the Long March rocket family between 2000 and 2009.

== Launch statistics ==
=== Rocket configurations ===
- Long March 2C
- Long March 2D
- Long March 2F
- Long March 3
- Long March 3A
- Long March 3B
- Long March 3C
- Long March 4B
- Long March 4C

=== Launch outcomes ===
- Failure
- Partial failure
- Success

== Launch history ==
=== 2000 ===
Date/time (UTC)	Rocket	Serial number	Launch site	Outcome
Date/time (UTC)	Payload	Separation orbit	Operator	Function
Date/time (UTC)	Remarks			
25 January 2000; 16:45	Long March 3A	F-04	Xichang LA-2	Successful
25 January 2000; 16:45	Chinasat-22	Geosynchronous transfer		Communication
25 June 2000; 11:50	Long March 3	F-13	Xichang LA-3	Successful
25 June 2000; 11:50	Fengyun-2B	Geosynchronous transfer		Meteorology
25 June 2000; 11:50	Final flight of Long March 3.			
1 September 2000; 03:25	Long March 4B	F-03	Taiyuan LA-7	Successful
1 September 2000; 03:25	Ziyuan II-01	Sun synchronous		Reconnaissance
30 October 2000; 16:02	Long March 3A	F-05	Xichang LA-2	Successful
30 October 2000; 16:02	Beidou-1A	Geosynchronous transfer		Navigation
20 December 2000; 16:20	Long March 3A	F-06	Xichang LA-2	Successful
20 December 2000; 16:20	Beidou-1B	Geosynchronous transfer		Navigation

=== 2001 ===
Date/time (UTC)	Rocket	Serial number	Launch site	Outcome
Date/time (UTC)	Payload	Separation orbit	Operator	Function
Date/time (UTC)	Remarks			
9 January 2001; 17:00	Long March 2F	F-02	Jiuquan LA-4/SLS-1	Successful
9 January 2001; 17:00	Shenzhou 2	Low Earth		Technology

=== 2002 ===
Date/time (UTC)	Rocket	Serial number	Launch site	Outcome
Date/time (UTC)	Payload	Separation orbit	Operator	Function
Date/time (UTC)	Remarks			
25 March 2002; 14:15	Long March 2F	F-03	Jiuquan LA-4/SLS-1	Successful
25 March 2002; 14:15	Shenzhou 3	Low Earth		Technology
15 May 2002; 01:50	Long March 4B	F-04	Taiyuan LA-7	Successful
15 May 2002; 01:50	Fengyun-1D	Sun-synchronous		Meteorology
15 May 2002; 01:50	Haiyang-1A	Sun-synchronous		Ocean observation
27 October 2002; 03:17	Long March 4B	F-05	Taiyuan LA-7	Successful
27 October 2002; 03:17	Ziyuan II-02	Sun-synchronous		Reconnaissance
29 December 2002; 16:40	Long March 2F	F-04	Jiuquan LA-4/SLS-1	Successful
29 December 2002; 16:40	Shenzhou 4	Low Earth		Technology

=== 2003 ===
Date/time (UTC)	Rocket	Serial number	Launch site	Outcome
Date/time (UTC)	Payload	Separation orbit	Operator	Function
Date/time (UTC)	Remarks			
24 May 2003; 16:34	Long March 3A	F-07	Xichang LA-2	Successful
24 May 2003; 16:34	Beidou-1C	Geostationary transfer		Navigation
15 October 2003; 01:00	Long March 2F	F-05	Jiuquan LA-4/SLS-1	Successful
15 October 2003; 01:00	Shenzhou 5	Low Earth		Manned spaceflight
15 October 2003; 01:00	First Chinese manned orbital mission			
21 October 2003; 03:16	Long March 4B	F-06	Taiyuan LA-7	Successful
21 October 2003; 03:16	CBERS-2	Sun-synchronous		Earth observation
21 October 2003; 03:16	Chuangxin 1 (01)	Sun-synchronous	China Academy of Science	Technology / Communication
3 November 2003; 07:20	Long March 2D	F-04	Jiuquan LA-4/SLS-2	Successful
3 November 2003; 07:20	FSW-3 No.1	Low Earth		Reconnaissance
14 November 2003; 16:01	Long March 3A	F-08	Xichang LA-2	Successful
14 November 2003; 16:01	ChinaSat-20	Geostationary transfer		Communication
29 December 2003; 19:06	Long March 2C / SM	F-19	Xichang LA-3	Successful
29 December 2003; 19:06	Double Star 1	High Earth		Magnetosphere research

=== 2004 ===
Date/time (UTC)	Rocket	Serial number	Launch site	Outcome
Date/time (UTC)	Payload	Separation orbit	Operator	Function
Date/time (UTC)	Remarks			
18 April 2004; 15:59	Long March 2C	F-20	Xichang LA-3	Successful
18 April 2004; 15:59	Shiyan 1	Sun-synchronous		Technology
18 April 2004; 15:59	Nano Satellite 1	Sun-synchronous		Technology
25 July 2004; 07:05	Long March 2C / SM	F-21	Taiyuan LA-7	Successful
25 July 2004; 07:05	Double Star 2	High Earth		Magnetosphere research
29 August 2004; 07:50	Long March 2C	F-22	Jiuquan LA-4/SLS-2	Successful
29 August 2004; 07:50	FSW-4 No.1	Low Earth		Reconnaissance
8 September 2004; 23:14	Long March 4B	F-07	Taiyuan LA-7	Successful
8 September 2004; 23:14	Shijian 6-01A	Sun-synchronous		Technology / Reconnaissance
8 September 2004; 23:14	Shijian 6-01B	Sun-synchronous		Technology / Reconnaissance
27 September 2004; 08:00	Long March 2D	F-05	Jiuquan LA-4/SLS-2	Successful
27 September 2004; 08:00	FSW-3 No.2	Low Earth		Reconnaissance
19 October 2004; 01:20	Long March 3A	F-09	Xichang LA-2	Successful
19 October 2004; 01:20	Fengyun-2C	Geostationary transfer		Meteorology
6 November 2004; 03:10	Long March 4B	F-08	Taiyuan LA-7	Successful
6 November 2004; 03:10	Ziyuan II-03	Sun-synchronous		Reconnaissance
18 November 2004; 10:45	Long March 2C	F-23	Xichang LA-3	Successful
18 November 2004; 10:45	Shiyan 2	Sun-synchronous		Technology

=== 2005 ===
Date/time (UTC)	Rocket	Serial number	Launch site	Outcome
Date/time (UTC)	Payload	Separation orbit	Operator	Function
Date/time (UTC)	Remarks			
12 April 2005; 12:00	Long March 3B	F-06	Xichang LA-2	Successful
12 April 2005; 12:00	Apstar 6	Geosynchronous transfer	Apstar	Communication
5 July 2005; 22:40	Long March 2D	F-06	Jiuquan LA-4/SLS-2	Successful
5 July 2005; 22:40	Shijian 7	Sun synchronous		Technology
2 August 2005; 07:30	Long March 2C	F-24	Jiuquan LA-4/SLS-2	Successful
2 August 2005; 07:30	FSW-4 No.2	Low Earth		Reconnaissance
29 August 2005; 08:45	Long March 2D	F-07	Jiuquan LA-4/SLS-2	Successful
29 August 2005; 08:45	FSW-3 No.3	Low Earth		Reconnaissance
12 October 2005; 01:00	Long March 2F	F-06	Jiuquan LA-4/SLS-1	Successful
12 October 2005; 01:00	Shenzhou 6	Low Earth		Manned spaceflight

=== 2006 ===
Date/time (UTC)	Rocket	Serial number	Launch site	Outcome
Date/time (UTC)	Payload	Separation orbit	Operator	Function
Date/time (UTC)	Remarks			
26 April 2006; 22:48	Long March 4C	F-01	Taiyuan LA-7	Successful
26 April 2006; 22:48	Yaogan 1	Sun synchronous		Reconnaissance
26 April 2006; 22:48	Maiden flight of Long March 4C.			
9 September 2006; 07:00	Long March 2C	F-25	Jiuquan LA-4/SLS-2	Successful
9 September 2006; 07:00	Shijian 8	Low Earth		Microgravity research
12 September 2006; 16:02	Long March 3A	F-10	Xichang LA-2	Successful
12 September 2006; 16:02	Chinasat-22A	Geosynchronous transfer		Communication
23 October 2006; 23:34	Long March 4B	F-09	Taiyuan LA-7	Successful
23 October 2006; 23:34	Shijian 6-02A	Sun synchronous		Technology / Reconnaissance
23 October 2006; 23:34	Shijian 6-02B	Sun synchronous		Technology / Reconnaissance
28 October 2006; 16:20	Long March 3B	F-07	Xichang LA-2	Successful
28 October 2006; 16:20	SinoSat 2	Geosynchronous transfer	Sino Satellite Communications	Communication
28 October 2006; 16:20	Satellite failed to deploy its solar panels after launch.			
8 December 2006; 00:53	Long March 3A	F-11	Xichang LA-2	Successful
8 December 2006; 00:53	Fengyun-2D	Geosynchronous transfer		Meteorology

=== 2007 ===
Date/time (UTC)	Rocket	Serial number	Launch site	Outcome
Date/time (UTC)	Payload	Separation orbit	Operator	Function
Date/time (UTC)	Remarks			
2 February 2007; 16:28	Long March 3A	F-12	Xichang LA-2	Successful
2 February 2007; 16:28	Beidou-1D	Geosynchronous transfer		Navigation
11 April 2007; 03:27	Long March 2C	F-26	Taiyuan LA-7	Successful
11 April 2007; 03:27	Haiyang-1B	Sun synchronous		Ocean observation
13 April 2007; 20:11	Long March 3A	F-13	Xichang LA-2	Successful
13 April 2007; 20:11	Compass-M1	Medium Earth		Navigation
13 May 2007; 16:01	Long March 3B/E	F-08	Xichang LA-2	Successful
13 May 2007; 16:01	NIGCOMSAT-1	Geosynchronous transfer		Communication
25 May 2007; 07:12	Long March 2D	F-08	Jiuquan, LA-4/SLS-2	Successful
25 May 2007; 07:12	Yaogan 2	Sun synchronous		Reconnaissance
25 May 2007; 07:12	ZDPS-1	Sun synchronous	Zhejiang University	Technology
31 May 2007; 16:08	Long March 3A	F-14	Xichang, LA-2	Successful
31 May 2007; 16:08	SinoSat 3	Geosynchronous transfer		Communication
31 May 2007; 16:08	The 100th launch of the Long March rocket series.			
5 July 2007; 12:08	Long March 3B	F-09	Xichang LA-2	Successful
5 July 2007; 12:08	Chinasat-6B	Geosynchronous transfer	China Satellite Communications	Communication
19 September 2007; 03:26	Long March 4B	F-10	Taiyuan LA-7	Successful
19 September 2007; 03:26	CBERS-2B	Sun synchronous		Earth observation
24 October 2007; 10:05	Long March 3A	F-15	Xichang LA-3	Successful
24 October 2007; 10:05	Chang'e 1	Lunar transfer	CNSA	Lunar orbiter
11 November 2007; 22:48	Long March 4C	F-02	Taiyuan LA-7	Successful
11 November 2007; 22:48	Yaogan 3	Sun synchronous		Reconnaissance

=== 2008 ===
Date/time (UTC)	Rocket	Serial number	Launch site	Outcome
Date/time (UTC)	Payload	Separation orbit	Operator	Function
Date/time (UTC)	Remarks			
25 April 2008; 15:35	Long March 3C	F-01	Xichang LA-2	Successful
25 April 2008; 15:35	Tianlian-1A	Geosynchronous transfer		Communication / Data transfer
25 April 2008; 15:35	Maiden flight of Long March 3C.			
27 May 2008; 03:02	Long March 4C	F-03	Taiyuan LA-7	Successful
27 May 2008; 03:02	Fengyun-3A	Sun synchronous		Meteorology
9 June 2008; 12:15	Long March 3B	F-10	Xichang LA-2	Successful
9 June 2008; 12:15	ChinaSat 9	Geosynchronous transfer	China Satellite Communications	Communication
6 September 2008; 03:25	Long March 2C / SMA	F-27	Taiyuan LA-7	Successful
6 September 2008; 03:25	Huanjing-1A	Sun synchronous		Earth observation
6 September 2008; 03:25	Huanjing-1B	Sun synchronous		Earth observation
25 September 2008; 13:10	Long March 2F	F-07	Jiuquan LA-4/SLS-1	Successful
25 September 2008; 13:10	Shenzhou 7	Low Earth		Manned spaceflight
25 October 2008; 01:15	Long March 4B	F-11	Taiyuan LA-9	Successful
25 October 2008; 01:15	Shijian 6-03A	Sun synchronous		Technology / Reconnaissance
25 October 2008; 01:15	Shijian 6-03B	Sun synchronous		Technology / Reconnaissance
29 October 2008; 16:53	Long March 3B/E	F-11	Xichang LA-2	Successful
29 October 2008; 16:53	VENESAT 1	Geosynchronous transfer		Communication
5 November 2008; 00:15	Long March 2D	F-09	Jiuquan LA-4/SLS-2	Successful
5 November 2008; 00:15	Shiyan 3	Sun synchronous		Technology
5 November 2008; 00:15	Chuangxin-1 (02)	Sun synchronous	China Academy of Science	Technology / Communication
1 December 2008; 04:42	Long March 2D	F-10	Jiuquan LA-4/SLS-2	Successful
1 December 2008; 04:42	Yaogan 4	Sun synchronous		Reconnaissance
15 December 2008; 03:22	Long March 4B	F-12	Taiyuan LA-9	Successful
15 December 2008; 03:22	Yaogan 5	Sun synchronous		Reconnaissance
23 December 2008; 00:54	Long March 3A	F-16	Xichang LA-3	Successful
23 December 2008; 00:54	Fengyun-2E	Geosynchronous transfer		Meteorology

=== 2009 ===
Date/time (UTC)	Rocket	Serial number	Launch site	Outcome
Date/time (UTC)	Payload	Separation orbit	Operator	Function
Date/time (UTC)	Remarks			
14 April 2009; 16:16	Long March 3C	F-02	Xichang LA-2	Successful
14 April 2009; 16:16	Compass-G2	Geosynchronous transfer		Navigation
22 April 2009; 02:55	Long March 2C	F-28	Taiyuan LA-7	Successful
22 April 2009; 02:55	Yaogan 6	Sun synchronous		Reconnaissance
31 August 2009; 09:28	Long March 3B	F-12	Xichang LA-2	Partial failure
31 August 2009; 09:28	Palapa-D	Geosynchronous transfer		Communication
31 August 2009; 09:28	Ice blockage in the third stage engine caused a performance shortfall, leaving the payload in a lower-than-planned orbit. The satellite maneuvered with its own propulsion system, reaching geosynchronous transfer orbit on 3 September 2009, and geostationary orbit on 9 September 2009.			
12 November 2009; 02:45	Long March 2C	F-29	Jiuquan LA-4/SLS-2	Successful
12 November 2009; 02:45	Shijian 11-01	Sun synchronous		Technology
9 December 2009; 08:42	Long March 2D	F-11	Jiuquan LA-4/SLS-2	Successful
9 December 2009; 08:42	Yaogan 7	Sun synchronous		Reconnaissance
15 December 2009; 02:31	Long March 4C	F-04	Taiyuan LA-9	Successful
15 December 2009; 02:31	Yaogan 8	Sun synchronous		Reconnaissance
15 December 2009; 02:31	Xiwang 1	Sun synchronous		Amateur radio

== Sources ==
- McDowell, Jonathan. "Launch Log". Jonathan's Space Page.
- McDowell, Jonathan. "Satellite Catalog". Jonathan's Space Page.
- Krebs, Gunter. "DF-5 family".
