= TurkSat-3USat =

Turkish communications nanosatellite

- Mission type: Communications
- Operator: Space Systems Design and Test Laboratory and Radio Frequency Electronics Laboratory, Istanbul Technical University
- COSPAR ID: 2013-018C
- SATCAT no.: 39152
- Mission duration: 3 years

Spacecraft properties
- Manufacturer: Istanbul Technical University
- Launch mass: 4 kg

Start of mission
- Launch date: 26 April 2013, 04:13:04 UTC
- Rocket: Long March 2D
- Launch site: Jiuquan, LA-4/SLS-2

Orbital parameters
- Reference system: Geocentric
- Regime: Sun-synchronous
- Perigee altitude: 635.0 km
- Apogee altitude: 661.5 km
- Inclination: 98.1°
- Period: 97.5 minutes
- Epoch: 26 April 2013

TurkSat-3USat is a Turkish communications nanosatellite developed by the Space Systems Design and Test Laboratory and Radio Frequency Electronics Laboratory of Istanbul Technical University (ITU) in collaboration with the Türksat company along with Turkish Amateur Satellite Technology Organization (TAMSAT). It was launched on 26 April 2013.

Started with a protocol signed on 29 November 2010, TurkSat-3USat is a follow-up project based on the ITUpSAT1 mission, which was launched on 23 September 2009.

== Launch and orbit ==
TurkSat-3USat was launched as a secondary payload on 26 April 2013 at 04:13:04 UTC atop a Long March 2D satellite launch vehicle from the Launch Area 4/South Launch Site 2 of Jiuquan Satellite Launch Center in Gobi Desert, China. Further payloads on this flight were:

- Gaofen 1, (CNSA), China
- NEE-01 Pegaso, (EXA), Ecuador
- CubeBug-1, (INVAP), Argentina

TurkSat-3USat was placed into a Sun-synchronous low Earth orbit at an altitude of 645 kilometres (401 mi). It orbits 2-3 times a day over Turkey. The satellite's mission duration is expected to be at least three years.

== Spacecraft and payload ==
TurkSat-3USat is packed in a three-unit CubeSat structure made by Innovative Solutions In Space BV (ISIS) from Delft, Netherlands. It is 10 by 10 centimetres (3.9 in × 3.9 in) wide and 34 centimetres (13 in) long, and has a mass of about 4 kilograms (8.8 lb).

The satellite's payload, a linear transponder and on-board computer, were designed in the RF Electronic Laboratory of ITU. It is Turkey's first indigenously developed satellite. TurkSat-3USat providing SSB/CW communication in amateur radio frequency bands. The transponder input is 145.940-145.990 MHz and the output is 435.200-435.250 MHz. On 437.225 MHz is either a CW beacon or 9,600 baud Audio frequency-shift keying (AFSK).

Solar panels and lithium polymer batteries together with super capacitors provide the required power. Passive magnetic attitude control system with hysteresis rods enable satellite stabilization. A C329 UART camera module is available on board for occasional snapshots of Earth.

The satellite features also a system to deorbit itself after the completion of its mission in compliance with the current CubeSat standard and United Nations regulations.
