= List of Long March launches (1980–1989) =

This is a list of launches made by the Long March rocket family between 1980 and 1989.

== Launch statistics ==
=== Rocket configurations ===
- Long March 2C
- Long March 3
- Long March 4A

=== Launch outcomes ===
- Failure
- Partial failure
- Success

== Launch history ==
=== 1980–1984 ===
Date/time (UTC)	Rocket	Serial number	Launch site	Outcome
Date/time (UTC)	Payload	Separation orbit	Operator	Function
Date/time (UTC)	Remarks			
9 September 1982; 07:19	Long March 2C	F-01	Jiuquan, LA-2/138	Successful
9 September 1982; 07:19	FSW-0 No.4	Low Earth		Reconnaissance
9 September 1982; 07:19	Maiden flight of Long March 2C.			
19 August 1983; 06:00	Long March 2C	F-02	Jiuquan, LA-2/138	Successful
19 August 1983; 06:00	FSW-0 No.5	Low Earth		Reconnaissance
29 January 1984; 12:25	Long March 3	F-01	Xichang, LA-3	Partial failure
29 January 1984; 12:25	STTW-T1	Geosynchronous transfer (intended); Low Earth (achieved)		Technology
29 January 1984; 12:25	Maiden flight of Long March 3, lower than planned orbit reached due to insufficient pressurization of the third stage engine during restart.			
8 April 1984; 11:20	Long March 3	F-02	Xichang, LA-3	Successful
8 April 1984; 11:20	STTW-T2	Geosynchronous transfer		Technology
8 April 1984; 11:20	First Chinese geostationary satellite			
12 September 1984; 05:44	Long March 2C	F-03	Jiuquan, LA-2/138	Successful
12 September 1984; 05:44	FSW-0 No.6	Low Earth		Reconnaissance

=== 1985–1989 ===
Date/time (UTC)	Rocket	Serial number	Launch site	Outcome
Date/time (UTC)	Payload	Separation orbit	Operator	Function
Date/time (UTC)	Remarks			
21 October 1985; 05:04	Long March 2C	F-04	Jiuquan, LA-2/138	Successful
21 October 1985; 05:04	FSW-0 No.7	Low Earth		Reconnaissance
1 February 1986; 12:37	Long March 3	F-03	Xichang, LA-3	Successful
1 February 1986; 12:37	DFH-2A-T1	Geosynchronous transfer		Communication
6 October 1986; 05:40	Long March 2C	F-05	Jiuquan, LA-2/138	Successful
6 October 1986; 05:40	FSW-0 No.8	Low Earth		Reconnaissance
5 August 1987; 06:39	Long March 2C	F-06	Jiuquan, LA-2/138	Successful
5 August 1987; 06:39	FSW-0 No.9	Low Earth		Reconnaissance
9 September 1987; 07:15	Long March 2C	F-07	Jiuquan LA-2/138	Successful
9 September 1987; 07:15	FSW-1 No.1	Low Earth		Reconnaissance
7 March 1988; 12:41	Long March 3	F-04	Xichang LA-3	Successful
7 March 1988; 12:41	Chinasat-1 (DFH-2A-T2)	Geosynchronous transfer		Communication
5 August 1988; 07:29	Long March 2C	F-08	Jiuquan LA-2/138	Successful
5 August 1988; 07:29	FSW-1 No.2	Low Earth		Reconnaissance
6 September 1988; 20:30	Long March 4A	F-01	Taiyuan LA-7	Successful
6 September 1988; 20:30	Fengyun-1A	Sun synchronous		Meteorology
6 September 1988; 20:30	Maiden flight of Long March 4A.			
22 December 1988; 12:40	Long March 3	F-05	Xichang LA-3	Successful
22 December 1988; 12:40	Chinasat-2 (DFH-2A-T3)	Geosynchronous transfer		Communication

== Sources ==
- McDowell, Jonathan. "Launch Log". Jonathan's Space Page.
- McDowell, Jonathan. "Satellite Catalog". Jonathan's Space Page.
- Krebs, Gunter. "DF-5 family".
