= LC 43 =

LC 43 or LC-43 is a designation used for several launch complexes:

- Cape Canaveral Launch Complex 43
- Plesetsk Cosmodrome Site 43
- Jiuquan Launch Area 4
