= List of Long March launches (1970–1979) =

This is a list of launches made by the Long March rocket family between 1970 and 1979.

== Launch statistics ==
=== Rocket configurations ===
- Long March 1
- Long March 2

=== Launch outcomes ===
- Failure
- Success

== Launch history ==
=== 1970–1974 ===
Date/time (UTC)	Rocket	Serial number	Launch site	Outcome
Date/time (UTC)	Payload	Separation orbit	Operator	Function
Date/time (UTC)	Remarks			
24 April 1970; 13:35	Long March 1	F-01	Jiuquan, LA-2/5020	Successful
24 April 1970; 13:35	Dong Fang Hong 1	Low Earth	CAST	Technology
24 April 1970; 13:35	First Chinese satellite. Maiden flight of Long March 1.			
3 March 1971; 12:15	Long March 1	F-02	Jiuquan, LA-2/5020	Successful
3 March 1971; 12:15	Shijian 1	Low Earth	CAST	Science and technology
3 March 1971; 12:15	Final flight of Long March 1.			
5 November 1974; 09:40	Long March 2	F-01	Jiuquan, LA-2/138	Failure
5 November 1974; 09:40	FSW-0 No.0	Low Earth (planned)		Reconnaissance
5 November 1974; 09:40	Maiden flight of Long March 2. Loss of control during ascent due to a broken control wire.			

=== 1975–1979 ===
Date/time (UTC)	Rocket	Serial number	Launch site	Outcome
Date/time (UTC)	Payload	Separation orbit	Operator	Function
Date/time (UTC)	Remarks			
16 November 1975; 03:29	Long March 2A	F-02	Jiuquan, LA-2/138	Successful
16 November 1975; 03:29	FSW-0 No.1	Low Earth		Reconnaissance
7 December 1976; 04:38	Long March 2A	F-03	Jiuquan, LA-2/138	Successful
7 December 1976; 04:38	FSW-0 No.2	Low Earth		Reconnaissance
26 January 1978; 04:58	Long March 2A	F-04	Jiuquan, LA-2/138	Successful
26 January 1978; 04:58	FSW-0 No.3	Low Earth		Reconnaissance
26 January 1978; 04:58	Final flight of Long March 2A.			

== Sources ==
- McDowell, Jonathan. "Launch Log". Jonathan's Space Page.
- McDowell, Jonathan. "Satellite Catalog". Jonathan's Space Page.
- Krebs, Gunter. "CZ-1 (Chang Zheng-1)".
- Krebs, Gunter. "DF-5 family".
