= Jiuquan Launch Area 4 =

Launch complex at the Jiuquan Satellite Launch Center

Launch Area 4 (South Launch Site)
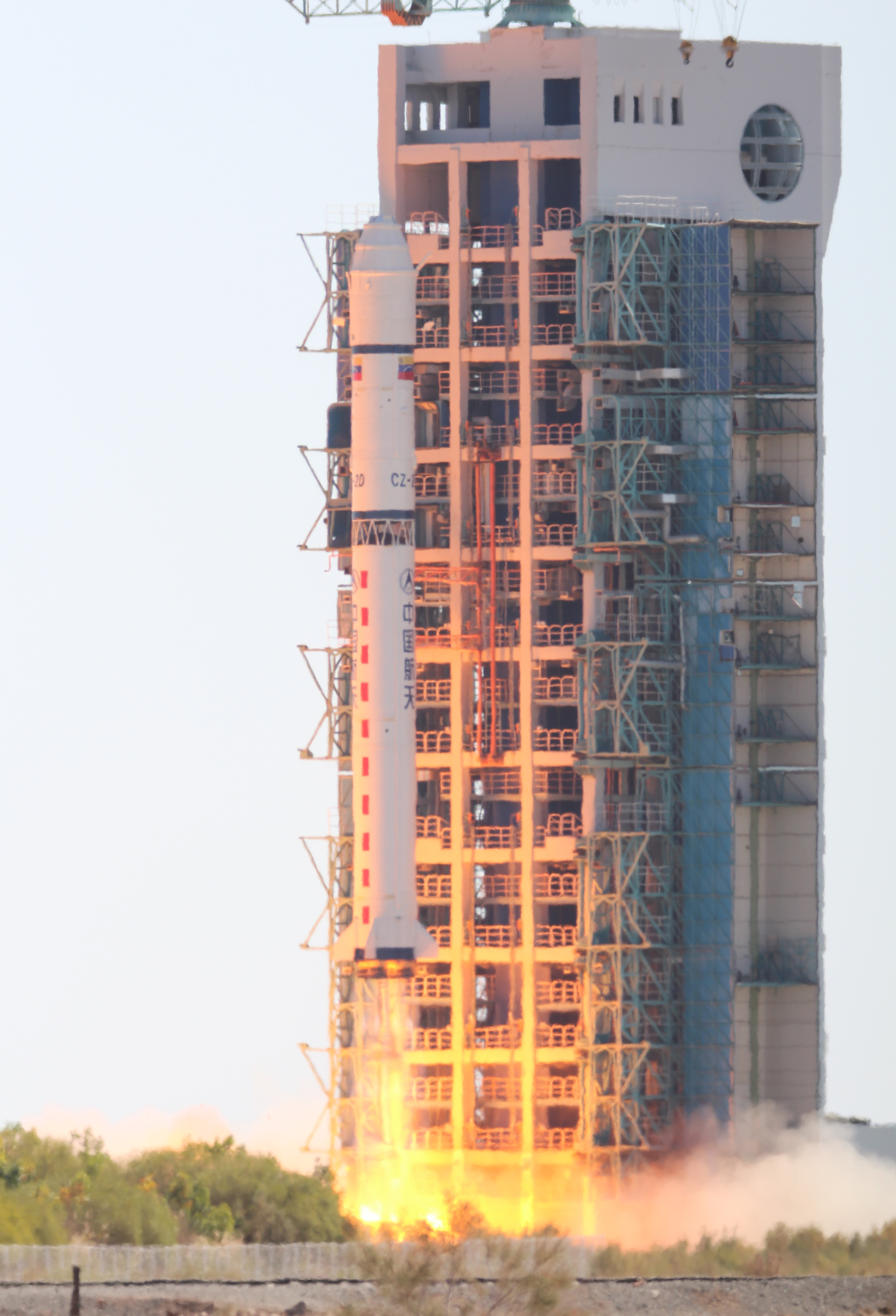
- Long March 2D in 2012
- Interactive map of Launch Area 4 (South Launch Site)
- Launch site: Jiuquan
- Coordinates: 40.9582°N 100.2913°E
- Time zone: UTC+8 (CST)
- Short name: LA-4 (SLS)
- Total launches: 158
- Launch pad: 2
SLS-1 launch history
- Status: Active
- Launches: 29
- First launch: 19 November 1999; Long March 2F / Shenzhou 1
- Last launch: 24 May 2026; Long March 2F/G / Shenzhou 23
- Associated rockets: Active: Long March 2F/G, Long March 2F/T; Retired: Long March 2F
SLS-2 launch history
- Status: Active
- Launches: 129
- First launch: 3 November 2003; Long March 2D / FSW-3 1
- Last launch: 19 November 2025; Long March 2C / Shijian 30A/B/C
- Associated rockets: Long March 2C; Long March 2D; Long March 4B; Long March 4C

Launch Area 4 (LA-4), also known as the South Launch Site or SLS, and LC-43, is the only active Long March launch complex at the Jiuquan Satellite Launch Center.

== History ==
It consists of two launch pads: SLS-1 / 921 (LC-43/91) and SLS-2 / 603 (LC-43/94).

SLS-1 has been the launch site for all missions conducted as part of the Shenzhou programme, including the first Chinese crewed spaceflight, Shenzhou 5. Since it was activated in 1999; Long March 2C, Long March 2D, Long March 2F, Long March 4C and Long March 11 rockets have launched from LA-4. The first spacecraft to be launched from the site was Shenzhou 1, atop a Long March 2F, on 19 November 1999.

SLS-2 became operational in 2003, and has since been used for most uncrewed launches from Jiuquan. As of March 2010, twenty launches have been made from the complex. The most recent launch from the site was from SLS-2 on 5 March 2010, when the Long March 4C made its first flight from the complex, carrying the Yaogan 9 satellite. Long March 4 launches had previously only been conducted from the Taiyuan Satellite Launch Center.
