= Long March 2C =

Version of the Long March 2

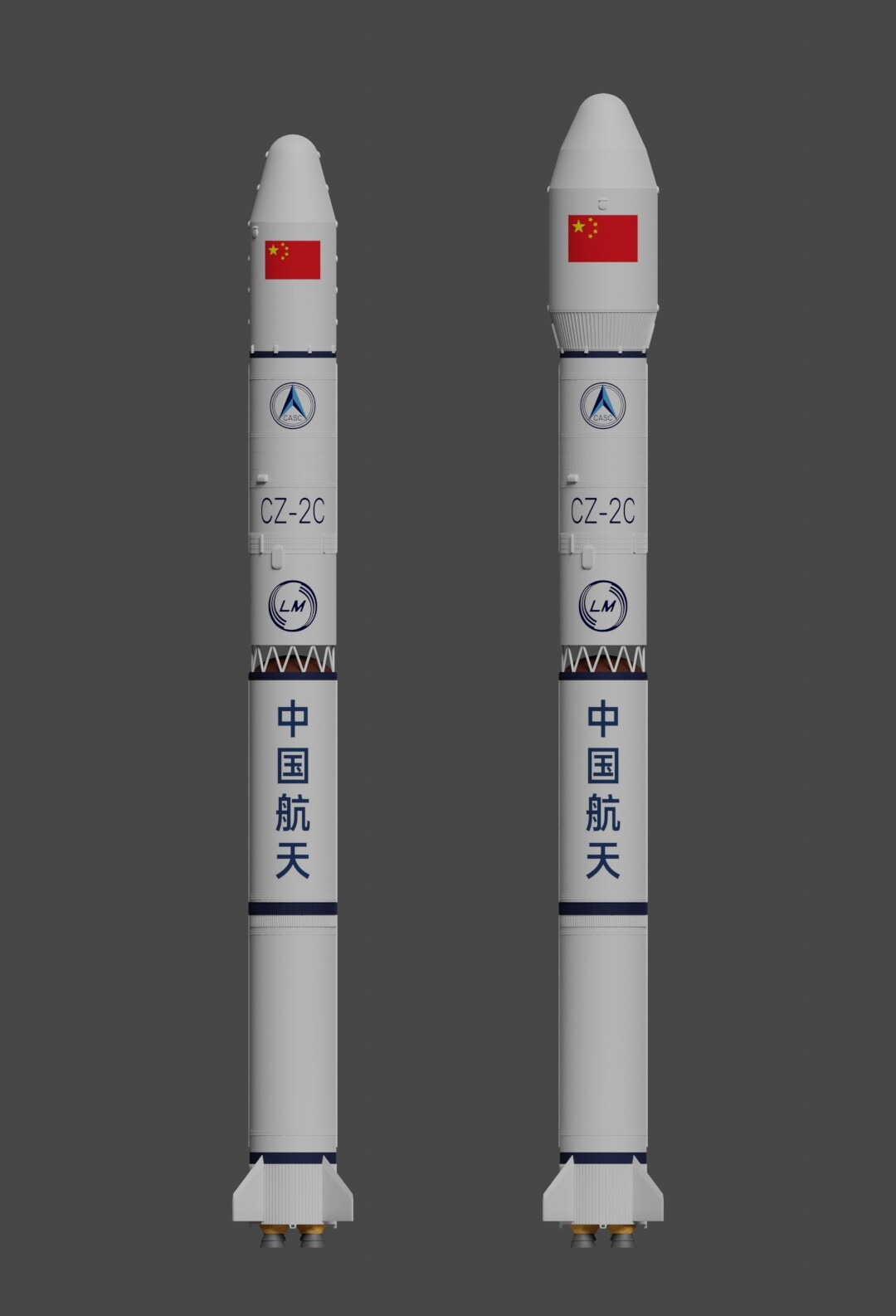
- Rendering of Long March 2C with 3.35 and 4.2 m (11 and 14 ft) diameter payload fairings
- Function: Medium-lift launch vehicle
- Manufacturer: China Academy of Launch Vehicle Technology
- Country of origin: China

Size
- Height: 42 m (138 ft)
- Diameter: 3.35 m (11.0 ft)
- Mass: 233,000 kg (514,000 lb)
- Stages: 2

Capacity

Payload to Low Earth orbit
- Mass: 3,850 kg (8,490 lb)

Payload to Sun-synchronous orbit
- Mass: 2C: 1,400 kg (3,100 lb); 2C/SMA: 1,900 kg (4,200 lb)

Payload to GTO
- Mass: 2C/SM: 1,250 kg (2,760 lb)

Associated rockets
- Family: Long March

Launch history
- Status: Active
- Launch sites: Jiuquan, LA-2/138 & LA-4/SLS-2; Taiyuan, LA-7 & LA-9; Xichang, LA-3
- Total launches: 89
- Success(es): 87
- Failure: 1
- Partial failure: 1
- First flight: 9 September 1982
- Last flight: 5 November 2026 (most recent)

First stage
- Height: 25.72 m
- Diameter: 3.35 m
- Propellant mass: 162,706 kg (358,705 lb)
- Powered by: 4 × YF-21C
- Maximum thrust: 2,961.6 kN (665,800 lb_{f})
- Specific impulse: 2,556.5 m/s (8,387 ft/s)
- Propellant: N_{2}O_{4} / UDMH

Second stage
- Height: 7.757 m
- Diameter: 3.35 m
- Propellant mass: 54,667 kg (120,520 lb)
- Powered by: 1 × YF-24E (with 1 × YF-22E main engine and 4 × YF-23C vernier engines)
- Maximum thrust: 741.4 kN (166,700 lb_{f}) (main); 47.1 kN (10,600 lb_{f}) (vernier)
- Specific impulse: 2,922.37 m/s (297.999 s) (main); 2,834.11 m/s (288.999 s) (vernier)
- Propellant: N_{2}O_{4} / UDMH

Third stage – (optional)
- Height: 1.5 m
- Diameter: 2.7 m
- Propellant mass: 125 kg (276 lb)
- Powered by: 1 solid motor
- Maximum thrust: 10.78 kN (2,420 lb_{f})
- Specific impulse: 2,804 m/s (285.9 s)
- Propellant: AP / HTPB

Third stage (optional) – YZ-1S
- Powered by: 1 × YF-50D
- Maximum thrust: 6.5 kN (1,500 lb_{f})
- Specific impulse: 315.5 s (3.094 km/s)
- Propellant: N_{2}O_{4} / UDMH

The Long March 2C (LM-2C), also known as the Chang Zheng 2C (CZ-2C), is a Chinese orbital launch vehicle, part of the Long March 2 rocket family. Developed and manufactured by the China Academy of Launch Vehicle Technology (CALT), the Long March 2C made its first launch on 9 September 1982. It is a two-stage launch vehicle with storable N2O4/UDMH propellants. The launch vehicle was derived from the DF-5 ICBM.

Several variants of this launch vehicle have been built, all using an optional third solid motor stage:

- 2C/SD: Commercial satellite launcher with a multi-satellite smart dispenser allowing delivery of two satellites simultaneously
- 2C/SM: Version for delivery of small satellites to high orbits
- 2C/SMA: Improved version of the 2C/SM

According to the website Gunter's Space Page, in addition to the launches listed in the following table, there may have been six additional CZ-2C launches during 2014 and 2015. These possible launches apparently were conducted at the Taiyuan Satellite Launch Center on the following dates: 9 January 2014, 7 August 2014, 2 December 2014, 7 June 2015, 20 August 2015, and 23 November 2015; five of these six launches were apparently successful, while the launch on 7 August 2014 appears to have failed. However, due to the lack of additional sources for these six launches, they are not currently included in the following launch list.

Aerodynamic grid fins were added on the Long March 2C in 2019 to help guide falling stages away from populated areas. China is studying using reusable rocket technology in the future. A fairing recovery system through parachutes has been tested during the Yaogan 30-09 and Yaogan 30-10 launches in order to improve control of debris landing inland on potentially populated areas.

== Launch statistics ==
- Failure
- Partial failure
- Success
- Planned

== List of launches ==
Flight number	Serial number	Date (UTC)	Launch site	Upper stage (if used)	Payload	Orbit	Result
1	Y1	9 September 1982; 07:19	LA-2/138, JSLC		FSW-0 No.4	LEO	Success
2	Y2	19 August 1983; 06:00	LA-2/138, JSLC		FSW-0 No.5	LEO	Success
3	Y3	12 September 1984; 05:44	LA-2/138, JSLC		FSW-0 No.6	LEO	Success
4	Y4	21 October 1985; 05:04	LA-2/138, JSLC		FSW-0 No.7	LEO	Success
5	Y5	6 October 1986; 05:40	LA-2/138, JSLC		FSW-0 No.8	LEO	Success
6	Y6	5 August 1987; 06:39	LA-2/138, JSLC		FSW-0 No.9	LEO	Success
7	Y7	9 September 1987; 07:15	LA-2/138, JSLC		FSW-1 No.1	LEO	Success
8	Y8	5 August 1988; 07:29	LA-2/138, JSLC		FSW-1 No.2	LEO	Success
9	Y9	5 October 1990; 06:14	LA-2/138, JSLC		FSW-1 No.3	LEO	Success
10	Y10	6 October 1992; 06:20	LA-2/138, JSLC		FSW-1 No.4; Freja	LEO	Success
11	Y11	8 October 1993; 08:00	LA-2/138, JSLC		FSW-1 No.5	LEO	Success
12	2CFP-Y1	1 September 1997; 14:00	LA-7, TSLC	2C/SD	Iridium mass simulator A Iridium mass simulator B	LEO	Success
13	2CFP-Y2	8 December 1997; 07:16	LA-7, TSLC	2C/SD	Iridium 42; Iridium 44	LEO	Success
14	2CFP-Y3	25 March 1998; 17:01	LA-7, TSLC	2C/SD	Iridium 51; Iridium 61	LEO	Success
15	2CFP-Y4	2 May 1998; 09:16	LA-7, TSLC	2C/SD	Iridium 69; Iridium 71	LEO	Success
16	2CFP-Y5	19 August 1998; 23:01	LA-7, TSLC	2C/SD	Iridium 76; Iridium 78	LEO	Success
17	2CFP-Y6	19 December 1998; 11:39	LA-7, TSLC	2C/SD	Iridium 88; Iridium 89	LEO	Success
18	2CFP-Y7	11 June 1999; 17:15	LA-7, TSLC	2C/SD	Iridium 92; Iridium 93	LEO	Success
19	2CSM-Y1	29 December 2003; 19:06	LA-3, XSLC	2C/SM	Double Star 1	HEO	Success
20	Y14	18 April 2004; 15:59	LA-3, XSLC		Shiyan 1 Nano Satellite 1	SSO	Success
21	2CSM-Y2	25 July 2004; 07:05	LA-7, TSLC	2C/SM	Double Star 2	HEO	Success
22	Y12	29 August 2004; 07:50	LA-4/SLS-2, JSLC		FSW-4 No.1	LEO	Success
23	Y15	18 November 2004; 10:45	LA-3, XSLC		Shiyan 2	SSO	Success
24	Y13	2 August 2005; 07:30	LA-4/SLS-2, JSLC		FSW-4 No.2	LEO	Success
25	Y16	9 September 2006; 07:00	LA-4/SLS-2, JSLC		Shijian 8	LEO	Success
26	Y18	11 April 2007; 03:27	LA-7, TSLC		HaiYang-1B	SSO	Success
27	2CSMA-Y1	6 September 2008; 03:25	LA-7, TSLC	2C/SMA	Huanjing-1A; Huanjing-1B	SSO	Success
28	Y19	22 April 2009; 02:55	LA-7, TSLC		Yaogan 6	SSO	Success
29	Y21	12 November 2009; 02:45	LA-4/SLS-2, JSLC		Shijian 11-01	SSO	Success
30	Y25	6 July 2011; 04:28	LA-4/SLS-2, JSLC		Shijian 11-03	SSO	Success
31	Y24	29 July 2011; 07:42	LA-4/SLS-2, JSLC		Shijian 11-02	SSO	Success
32	Y26	18 August 2011; 09:28	LA-4/SLS-2, JSLC		Shijian 11-04	SSO	Failure
33	Y20	29 November 2011; 18:50	LA-9, TSLC		Yaogan 13	SSO	Success
34	2CSMA-Y2	14 October 2012; 03:25	LA-9, TSLC	2C/SMA	Shijian 9A; Shijian 9B	SSO	Success
35	Y17	18 November 2012; 22:53	LA-9, TSLC		Huanjing-1C; Xinyan 1 Fengniao 1	SSO	Success
36	Y23	15 July 2013; 09:27	LA-4/SLS-2, JSLC		Shijian 11-05	SSO	Success
37	Y28	29 October 2013; 02:50	LA-9, TSLC		Yaogan 18	SSO	Success
38	Y27	31 March 2014; 02:46	LA-4/SLS-2, JSLC		Shijian 11-06	SSO	Success
39	Y31	28 September 2014; 05:13	LA-4/SLS-2, JSLC		Shijian 11-07	SSO	Success
40	Y32	27 October 2014; 06:59	LA-4/SLS-2, JSLC		Shijian 11-08	SSO	Success
41	Y35	14 November 2014; 18:53	LA-9, TSLC		Yaogan 23	SSO	Success
42	Y29	29 September 2017; 04:21	LA-3, XSLC		Yaogan 30-01 A/B/C	LEO	Success
43	Y33	24 November 2017; 18:10	LA-3, XSLC		Yaogan 30-02 A/B/C	LEO	Success
44	Y34	25 December 2017; 19:44	LA-3, XSLC		Yaogan 30-03 A/B/C	LEO	Success
45	Y36	25 January 2018; 05:39	LA-3, XSLC		Yaogan 30-04 A/B/C	LEO	Success
46	Y44	27 June 2018; 03:30	LC-3, XSLC		XJSS A/B	LEO	Success
47	2CSMA-Y3	9 July 2018; 03:56	LA-4/SLS-2, JSLC	2C/SMA	PRSS-1; PakTES-1A	SSO	Success
48	Y39	7 September 2018; 03:15	LA-9, TSLC		HaiYang-1C	SSO	Success
49	Y38	9 October 2018; 02:43	LA-4/SLS-2, JSLC	2C/YZ-1S	Yaogan 32A, 32B	SSO	Success
50	Y22	29 October 2018; 00:43	LA-4/SLS-2, JSLC		CFOSAT	SSO	Success
51	Y37	26 July 2019; 03:57	LA-3, XSLC		Yaogan 30-05 A/B/C	LEO	Success
52	Y42	24 March 2020; 03:43	LA-3, XSLC		Yaogan 30-06 A/B/C	LEO	Success
53	Y40	10 June 2020; 18:31	LA-9, TSLC		HaiYang 1D	SSO	Success
54	Y43	26 October 2020; 15:19	LA-3, XSLC		Yaogan 30-07 A/B/C	LEO	Success
55	Y47	6 May 2021; 18:11	LA-3, XSLC		Yaogan 30-08 A/B/C; Tianqi-12	LEO	Success
56	Y48	18 June 2021; 06:30	LA-3, XSLC		Yaogan 30-09 A/B/C; Tianqi-14	LEO	Success
57	Y49	19 July 2021; 00:19	LA-3, XSLC		Yaogan 30-10 A/B/C; Tianqi-15	LEO	Success
58	Y51	24 August 2021; 11:15	LA-4/SLS-2, JSLC	2C/YZ-1S	RSW-01; RSW-02; Undisclosed payload	LEO	Success
59	Y41	3 November 2021; 07:43	LA-4/SLS-2, JSLC	2C/YZ-1S	Yaogan 32-02 A/B	SSO	Success
60	Y62	5 March 2022; 06:01	LA-3, XSLC		Yinhe Hangtian-2 01/.../06; Xuanming Xingyuan	LEO	Success
61	Y70	29 April 2022; 04:11	LA-4/SLS-2, JSLC		SuperView Neo 1-01/02 (Siwei Gaojing 1-01/02)	SSO	Success
62	Y53	20 May 2022; 10:30	LA-4/SLS-2, JSLC	2C/YZ-1S	LEO Test Sat 1/2; Digui Tongxin Weixing	LEO	Success
63	Y65	2 June 2022; 04:00	LA-3, XSLC		GeeSAT-1 01/.../09	LEO	Success
64	Y71	15 July 2022; 22:57	LA-9, TSLC		SuperView Neo 2-01/02 (Siwei-03/04)	SSO	Success
65	Y66	12 October 2022; 22:53	LA-9, TSLC		S-SAR 01 (Huanjing-2E)	SSO	Success
66	Y61	12 January 2023; 18:10	LA-3, XSLC		Apstar 6E +(independent propulsion module)	GTO	Success
67	Y63	24 February 2023; 04:01	LA-4/SLS-2, JSLC		Horus-1	SSO	Success
68	Y64	13 March 2023; 04:02	LA-4/SLS-2, JSLC		Horus-2	SSO	Success
69	Y60	21 May 2023; 08:00	LA-4/SLS-2, JSLC		MSS-1 A/B; Luojia-2 01	LEO	Success
70	Y52	9 July 2023; 11:00	LA-4/SLS-2, JSLC	2C/YZ-1S	Hulianwang Jishu Shiyan 1A, 1B	LEO	Success
71	Y46	8 August 2023; 22:53	LA-9, TSLC		S-SAR 02 (Huanjing-2F)	SSO	Success
72	Y56	16 November 2023; 03:55	LA-4/SLS-2, JSLC	2C/YZ-1S	Haiyang-3A	SSO	Success
73	Y54	4 December 2023; 04:10	LA-4/SLS-2, JSLC		MisrSat-2; Xingchi-2A/2B	SSO	Success
74	Y73	30 December 2023; 00:13	LA-4/SLS-2, JSLC	2C/YZ-1S	Hulianwang Jishu Shiyan 4A, 4B, 4C	LEO	Success
75	Y30	9 January 2024; 07:03	LA-3, XSLC		Einstein Probe	LEO	Success
76	Y85	2 February 2024; 23:37	LA-3, XSLC		GeeSAT-2 10/.../20	LEO	Success
77	Y86	13 March 2024; 12:51	LA-3, XSLC	2C/YZ-1S	DRO-A, B	Selenocentric (DRO)	Partial failure
78	Y50	22 June 2024; 07:00	LA-3, XSLC		SVOM; CATCH 1	LEO	Success
79	Y82	23 October 2024; 01:09	LA-3, XSLC		Yaogan 43-03A/B/C	LEO	Success
80	Y55	9 November 2024; 03:39	LA-4/SLS-2, JSLC		PIESAT-2A 01; PIESAT-2B 01-03	SSO	Success
81	Y57	24 November 2024; 23:39	LA-4/SLS-2, JSLC		SuperView Neo 2-03/04	SSO	Success
82	Y81	27 February 2025; 07:08	LA-4/SLS-2, JSLC		SuperView Neo 1-03/04	SSO	Success
83	Y87	16 September 2025; 01:06	LA-4/SLS-2, JSLC	2C/YZ-1S	Huliangwang Jishu Shiyan 7A, B, C, D	LEO	Success
84	Y?	19 November 2025; 04:01	LA-4/SLS-2, JSLC		Shijian 30A; Shijian 30B; Shijian 30C	LEO	Success
85	Y?	15 January 2026; 04:01	LA-4/SLS-2, JSLC		AlSat 3A	SSO	Success
86	Y?	31 January 2026; 04:01	LA-4/SLS-2, JSLC		AlSat 3B	SSO	Success
87	Y?	27 March 2026; 04:11	LA-4/SLS-2, JSLC	2C/YZ-1S	Shiyan 33	SSO	Success
88	Y?	17 August 2026; 03:02	LA-9, TSLC		Satellite for Earth Observation (SEO)	SSO	Success
89	Y84	5 November 2026; 15:58	LA-3, XSLC		Yaogan-51 07 to 09	LEO	Success

== Launch failures ==
=== Shijian 11-04 launch failure ===
On 18 August 2011, a Long March 2C rocket failed during the launch of the Shijian 11-04 satellite. During the powered flight phase of the second stage, the connecting mechanism between vernier engine no.3 and the servo-control mechanism of the second stage failed, which led to the loss of attitude control on the second stage.

== See also ==
- List of Long March launches (2025-2029)
