= Fanhui Shi Weixing =

Chinese recoverable reconnaissance satellites (1974-2016)

- 返回式卫星
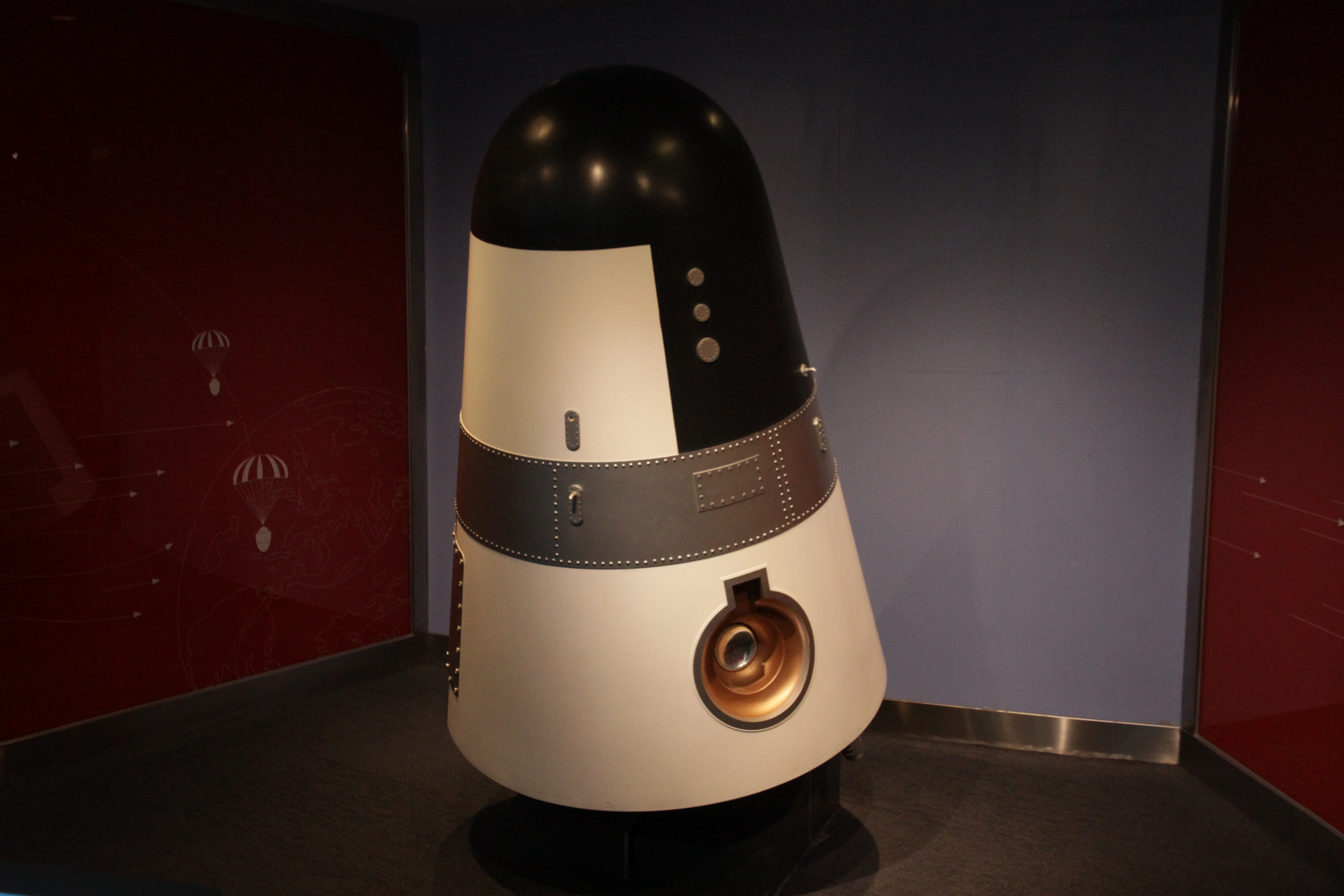
- Mock-up in Shanghai Museum

Program overview
- Country: People's Republic of China
- Organization: China Academy of Space Technology (CAST)
- Purpose: Reconnaissance, Earth observation, microgravity experiments
- Status: Completed

Programme history
- Duration: 1974–2016
- First flight: 26 November 1974
- Last flight: 5 April 2016
- Successes: 23
- Failures: 2
- Launch site: Jiuquan Satellite Launch Center (JSLC)

Vehicle information
- Launch vehicles: Long March 2; Long March 2C; Long March 2D

The Fanhui Shi Weixing (simplified Chinese: 返回式卫星; traditional Chinese: 返回式衛星; pinyin: Fǎnhuí Shì Wèixīng; lit. 'recoverable satellite') series of satellites was China's first reconnaissance satellite program. The satellites were used for military reconnaissance and civilian imagery tasks and completed 23 missions between November 1974 and April 2016.

There were four generations of the Fanhui Shi Weixing (FSW) satellites: FSW-0 from 1974 to 1987; FSW-1 from 1987 to 1993; FSW-2 from 1992 to 1996; and FSW-3 from 2003 to 2005. Two derivative models, the Shijian-8 (SJ-8) and Shijian-10 (SJ-10), were developed and launched as 'seed satellites' conducting bioastronautic experiments for the Chinese Ministry of Agriculture. All FSW-series satellites were launched into orbit using Long March rockets from the Jiuquan Satellite Launch Center (JSLC).

The successful recovery of an FSW-0 recoverable satellite in 1974 established China as the third nation to launch and recover a satellite following the United States and the Soviet Union. This success served as the basis for the second Chinese crewed space program, the third crewed program (Project 863) during the late 1980s, and the current Shenzhou program (active since 1992). A novel feature of the spacecraft's reentry module was the use of impregnated oak, a natural material, as the ablative material for its heat shield.

The Fanhui Shi Weixing (FSW) imagery reconnaissance satellite program was succeeded by the ongoing Yaogan Weixing satellite program which began in 2006 and consists of imagery, synthetic aperture radar (SAR), and ocean surveillance payloads.

== History ==
=== Fanhui Shi Weixing-0 ===
The beginnings of the FSW-0 (military designation "Jianbing-1") recoverable satellite began in 1965 when Qian Xuesen conceived and proposed the idea and, after significant and tragic setbacks, finally completed it in 1974. He urged the Chinese Central Planning Committee to invest in the development of recoverable satellite technologies, similar to those the United States and Soviet Union had been successfully operating since the early 1960s. Interested more in the military value recoverable satellites would provide, the committee accepted and tasked space physicist and engineer Zhao Jiuzhang (who is today known as the "father of the Chinese satellite program" for his work as the chief designer of China's first satellite, Dong Fang Hong 1) to head the project. Earnest work on the project began in 1965 after Zhao's team submitted a preliminary analysis of requirements having toured military and civilian organizations to assess potential applications of a recoverable satellite program. Wang Xiji, an American-educated rocket scientist and designer of the Long March 1 rocket which would launch the Dong Fang Hong 1 satellite in 1970, was named chief designer of the recoverable satellite program.

During the Cultural Revolution, the purges of Mao's Red Guards focused heavily on academics and intellectuals regarded as the "Stinking Old Ninth" which included the seizure of the Chinese Academy of Sciences and the persecution of 131 of the 171 senior members and the killings of 229 members. Zhao was killed (though some sources say he committed suicide under the pressures of persecution), Qian was reduced to the role of a common worker, and Wang was accused of sabotaging an FSW test parachute for which he fought to prove his innocence. Later in 1971, when Mao's successor Lin Biao died in a plane crash following an abortive coup d'état, Mao initiated an immense witch-hunt to oust potential supporters of Lin Biao. As a result, many departments of the Academy were closed to include the Shuguang project, China's proposed first crewed spacecraft, which had shared much of its technology with the recoverable satellite program costing the team valuable development money and time. Only after several months of persistent attack by Mao's Red Guards did Premier of the PRC Zhou Enlai intervene to put fifteen key scientists in critical missile programs under state protection while others did their best to survive the violence.

Despite the challenges and four years past its goal, the China Association for Science and Technology (CAST) completed the FSW-0 satellite which weighed 1,800 kilograms and carried photographic film and two cameras intended to support both military and civilian needs. FSW-0 carried a prism-scanning panoramic camera and a stellar camera both designed by the Changchun Institute of Optics and tested on two T7A rockets in July 1967.

In 1972, several technician teams were dispatched to Laiyang in Shandong, Xinhua in Hunan, Lhasa in Tibet, and Kashgar in Xinjiang to establish the nation's first satellite control, tracking, and telemetry stations. Having established four fixed stations and two mobile, technicians tested the control network with Soviet-made Il-14 aircraft flying at high-altitudes.

On 8 September 1974, FSW-0 No. 1 was transported to the Jiuquan Satellite Launch Center (JSLC) for launch on a Long March 2 rocket (derived from the Dongfeng 5 ballistic missile). The first attempt to launch an FSW-0 satellite into orbit on 5 November 1974 failed with the rocket exploding approximately twenty seconds after launch and debris crashing 300 meters from the launch pad. Analysis of the recovered debris led Chinese scientists to blame copper wire damage in the rocket during the second stage.

==== Maiden launch ====
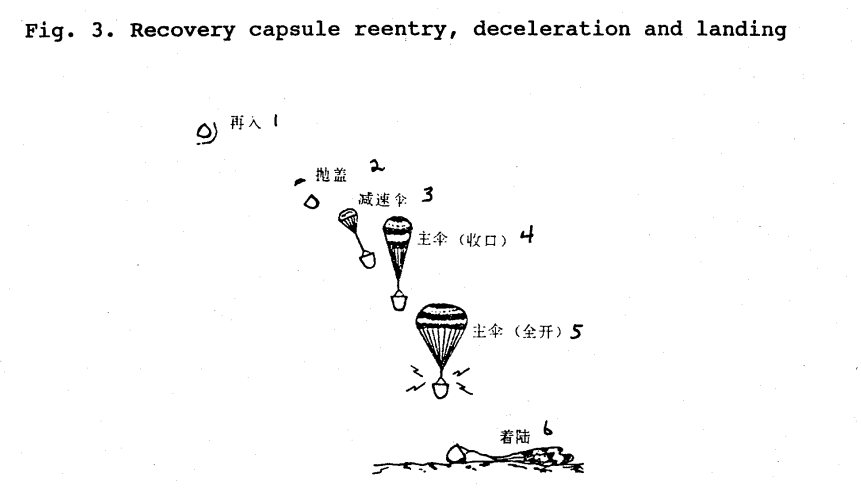
Diagram of capsule reentry by Wang Xiji

The first successful FSW-0 launched on 26 November 1975 from Jiuquan Satellite Launch Center in Inner Mongolia Pad 138, Launch Complex 2. Immediately after launch, it became apparent the satellite would be irrecoverable due to a loss of pressure in the gas orientation system. Qian estimated the chances of recovery to be near zero while Yang Jiachi (developer of the FSW-0's attitude control system) believed the seeming loss of pressure was only the result of the gasses cooling (Charles's law) as the spacecraft cooled exiting the atmosphere. Despite Yang's adamance that the mission should continue, the decision was made and Xian Ground Station commanded the satellite to reenter the atmosphere after only three days flight time.

With observers waiting in the mountains of Sichuan, four coal miners seated in a mess hall in Guizhou Province about 400 kilometers away watched a red-hot object crash into a nearby grove of trees around noon. Venturing out to see the crashed object, one reportedly threw a rock and was relieved to hear a metallic sound confirming the object was of terrestrial origin. The miners reported the object to local authorities and the recovery team eventually arrived to find the spacecraft intact and the imagery undamaged. The reentry vehicle was damaged by reentry and the parachute partially burned; however, the film was declared undamaged and the mission was deemed a success, making China the third nation to capture space-based imagery after the United States' CORONA satellite in 1960 and the Soviet Union's Zenit satellite in 1962.

The extracted imagery was in extremely low resolution and suffered significant distortion from in-orbit movements; however, the FSW-0 was launched eight more times on an imagery mission with the final mission purposed to conduct microgravity experiments. The microgravity experiments of the last mission tested the smelting and recrystallization of alloys and semiconductor materials including gallium arsenide and would continue as part of the larger FSW satellite program.

=== Fanhui Shi Weixing-1 ===
The FSW-1 series of reconnaissance satellites represents the application of lessons learned from the FSW-0 series, particularly in stabilizing the imagery obtained in-orbit. Launched one month following the last launch of the FSW-0 series, changes made with the new series included an increased in-orbit time (three days to five days) and precision while imaging was improved from 1° to 0.7°. The mass of the newer satellite increased from 1,800 kilograms to 2,100 kilograms and the FSW-1 series was launched into a more circular orbit with a slightly increased orbital perigee and reduced orbital apogee. These improvements reportedly improved the accuracy and stability of the collected imagery to improve the quality of maps produced. Unlike its contemporaries, American and Soviet (later Russian) photographic reconnaissance satellites, and like its predecessor the FSW-0, FSW-1 series satellites had no in-orbit maneuvering capabilities to enable prolonged observations over areas of interest.

FSW-1 satellites, though believed to be fulfilling a secondary military purpose, were primarily cartographic in purpose featuring a higher-resolution (10–15 meter resolution) camera system and a lower-resolution charge-coupled device (CCD) camera (50 meter resolution) that transmitted images to the ground in near-real-time to avoid squandering the limited on-board film used by the higher-resolution camera. The lower-resolution camera was reportedly used to image when unfavorable environmental conditions such as cloud cover prevented the collection of high-quality imagery.

FSW-1 4 carried in an open trunk below the imaging capsule the Swedish Freja magnetospheric research payload. The nineteen million USD 214 kilogram Freja payload was designed by the Swedish Space Corporation on behalf of the Swedish National Space Board and carried eight experiments in the subjects of electric fields for Sweden's Royal Institute of Technology, magnetic fields for Johns Hopkins University in the United States, cold plasma for the National Research Council of Canada, hot plasma and waves for the Swedish Institute of Space Physics, auroral imagery for the University of Calgary in Canada, and electron beams and particle correlators for the Max-Planck Institute in Germany. FSW-1 5 carried, in addition to its earth-imaging payload and microgravity research equipment, a diamond-studded medallion commemorating the 100th anniversary of Chairman Mao Zedong's birth.

Satellites of the FSW-1 series were developed by the China Academy of Space Technology (CAST), used a celestial camera for positional information, were stabilized by a 3-axis system, powered by a FG-23 retro motor, battery powered, and communicated at 179.985 MHz (VHF). After atmospheric reentry, the reentry capsule deployed a single drogue at high velocities 10–20 kilometers above the ground followed by a main parachute deployed at a more arrested speed of 5 kilometers altitude to slow the capsule's descent to around 10 meters per second by the time the reentry capsule struck the ground.

All five FSW-1 series satellites were launched using a Long March-2C rocket from the Jiuquan Satellite Launch Center (JSLC) and controlled via the Xi'an Satellite Monitor and Control Center (XSCC) in Shaanxi Province. With five successful launches and four successful recoveries, the FSW-1 program was largely a success; however, the failure of the final FSW-1 satellite, in part, marred the legacy of the series by gaining worldwide attention for its uncontrolled orbital decay.

==== Uncontrolled decay ====
FSW-1 No. 5, the last satellite of the series, launched on 8 October 1993, experienced a failure in the satellite's attitude control system which rendered it unable to properly reenter the atmosphere. The failure of the attitude control system when the satellite was instructed to return on 16 October 1993 tilted the spacecraft 90° from its intended position causing the reentry capsule to enter a highly elliptical orbit of 179 km × 3,031 km instead of returning to Earth. The re-entry capsule entered the atmosphere on 12 March 1996 over the South Atlantic, in a tumbling fashion which exposed much of the spacecraft unprotected by the heat shield to extreme heat and friction during reentry. Although the extent of the destruction is unknown, U.S. Space Command reported that some fragments had survived the conditions of reentry that had fallen into the Pacific Ocean near the coast of Peru. The loss of the FSW-1 5 was the only failed recovery of the larger FSW program.

Although in the end only a few fragments had likely reached the ocean's surface, the abortive reentry was widely reported on American and European television and in newspapers. Five days before the satellite's atmospheric reentry, the orbit was so unpredictable that studies could guess its reentry time with no less than a 10-hour error and could not predict where the fragments would land nor if it would strike a populated area. Western news followed the updates and predictions released by Air Force Major Don Planalp of U.S. Space Command in Colorado and was concerned largely with the novel and potential dangers of heavy metal fragments striking residential areas. News on the satellite frequently likened the satellite's decay to that of the Soviet Salyut-7 and become uniquely enamored with the onboard diamond-studded medallion celebrating the 100th birthday of the late Mao Zedong. Press organizations were unable to receive a comment from the Chinese Embassy in Washington on the satellite's fall as the Chinese government was still tight-lipped on the satellite's existence. Although experts stressed the low probability that the decaying satellite would strike of in a place of significance, some governments did issue be-prepared orders to law enforcement in the case of the potential disaster, most prominently the United Kingdom's Home Office.

== Specifications ==
The FSW-0 was the first generation of China's returnable satellites. Its primary use was for the inspection of national land and natural resources. First-generation FSW-0 satellites all carried prism-scan panoramic cameras. The FSW-0 did not have a complete orbit control system, so its decay or attenuation of orbit was quick, and it had a relatively short orbital duration. Its landing or return location accuracy was also relatively low.

The next generation, the FSW-1, carried more powerful cameras than its predecessor and was mainly used for drawing maps. Its spatial resolution was as high as 10m (able to discern objects 10 meters apart). The next two generations were called FSW-2 and FSW-3.

== Satellites ==
Name	Military designation	Launch	Duration	Capsule recovery	Inclination	SCN	COSPAR ID	Mass (t)	Orbit	Launcher
N/A	N/A	5 November 1974	N/A	N/A	N/A	N/A	(Failed)	Unknown	N/A	Long March 2
FSW-0 1	Jianbing-1 1	26 November 1975	3 days	Unknown	63.0°	8452	1975-111A	1.790	181 km × 495 km	Long March 2A
FSW-0 2	Jianbing-1 2	7 December 1976	2 days	9 December 1976	59.49°	9587	1976-117A	1.812	172 km × 492 km	Long March 2A
FSW-0 3	Jianbing-1 3	26 January 1978	5 days	30 January 1978	57.0°	10611	1978-011A	1.810	169 km × 488 km	Long March 2A
FSW-0 4	Jianbing-1 4	9 September 1982	5 days	14 September 1982	63.0°	13521	1982-090A	1.783	175 km × 404 km	Long March 2C
FSW-0 5	Jianbing-1 5	19 August 1983	5 days	24 August 1983	63.3°	14288	1983-086A	1.842	178 km × 415 km	Long March 2C
FSW-0 6	Jianbing-1 6	12 September 1984	5 days	17 September 1984	62.94°	15279	1984-098A	1.809	171 km × 409 km	Long March 2C
FSW-0 7	Jianbing-1 7	21 October 1985	5 days	26 October	62.98	16177	1985-096A	1.810	176 km × 402 km	Long March 2C
FSW-0 8	Jianbing-1 8	6 October 1986	5 days	11 October 1986	56.96°	17001	1986-076A	1.770	142 km × 402 km	Long March 2C
FSW-0 9	Jianbing-1 9	5 August 1987	5 days	10 August 1987	62.95°	18306	1987-067A	1.810	172 km × 410 km	Long March 2C
FSW-1 1	Jianbing-1A 1	9 September 1987	8 days	17 September 1987	62.99°	18341	1987-075A	2.07	208 km × 323 km	Long March 2C
FSW-1 2	Jianbing-1A 2	5 August 1988	8 days	13 August 1988	63.02°	19368	1988-067A	2.13	208 km × 326 km	Long March 2C
FSW-1 3	Jianbing-1A 3	5 October 1990	8 days	13 October 1990	56.98°	20838	1990-089A	2.08	206 km × 308 km	Long March 2C
FSW-2 1	Jianbing-1B 1	9 August 1992	15 days	25 August 1992	63°	22072	1992-051A	2.50	354 km × 173 km	Long March 2D
FSW-1 4	Jianbing-1A 4	6 October 1992	6 days	13 October 1992	63.01°	22162	1992-064B	2.06	211 km × 315 km	Long March 2C
FSW-1 5	Jianbing-1A 5	8 October 1993	30 months	(Disintegrated on 12 March 1996)	56.95°	22859	1993-063A	2.099	214 km × 317 km	Long March 2C
FSW-2 2	Jianbing-1B 2	3 July 1994	15 days	18 July 1994	62.9°	23145	1994-037A	2.60	355 km × 176 km	Long March 2D
FSW-2 3	Jianbing-1B 3	20 October 1996	15 days	4 November 1996	63°	24634	1996-059A	2.60	332 km × 168 km	Long March 2D
FSW-3 1	Jianbing-2 1	3 November 2003	24 days	27 November 2003	63°	28078	2003-051A	3.60	330 km × 191 km	Long March 2D
FSW-3 2	Jianbing-4 1	29 August 2004	26.67 days	24 September 2004	63°	28402	2004-033A	2.10	553 km × 168 km	Long March 2C
FSW-3 3	Jianbing-2 2	27 September 2004	17.78 days	15 October 2004	63°	28424	2004-039A	3.60	315 km × 201 km	Long March 2D
FSW-3 4	Jianbing-4 2	2 August 2005	27.00 days	29 August 2005	63°	28776	2005-027A	3.40	547 km × 169 km	Long March 2C
FSW-3 3	Jianbing-2 3	29 August 2005	49.00 days	17 October 2005	64.8°	28824	2005-033A	3.60	264 km × 178 km	Long March 2D

Notes: FSW-3 No. 2 and No. 4 are sometimes referred to as FSW-4 1 and 2 owing to design variations and the military designation's transition from Jianbing-2 to Jianbing-4; however, most sources retain the original FSW-3 name. Because Jianbing-4 No. 1 and No. 2 are differently designed, some sources refer to them as Jianbing-4A (JB-4A) and Jianbing-4B (JB-4B), respectively.
