= 2028 in spaceflight =

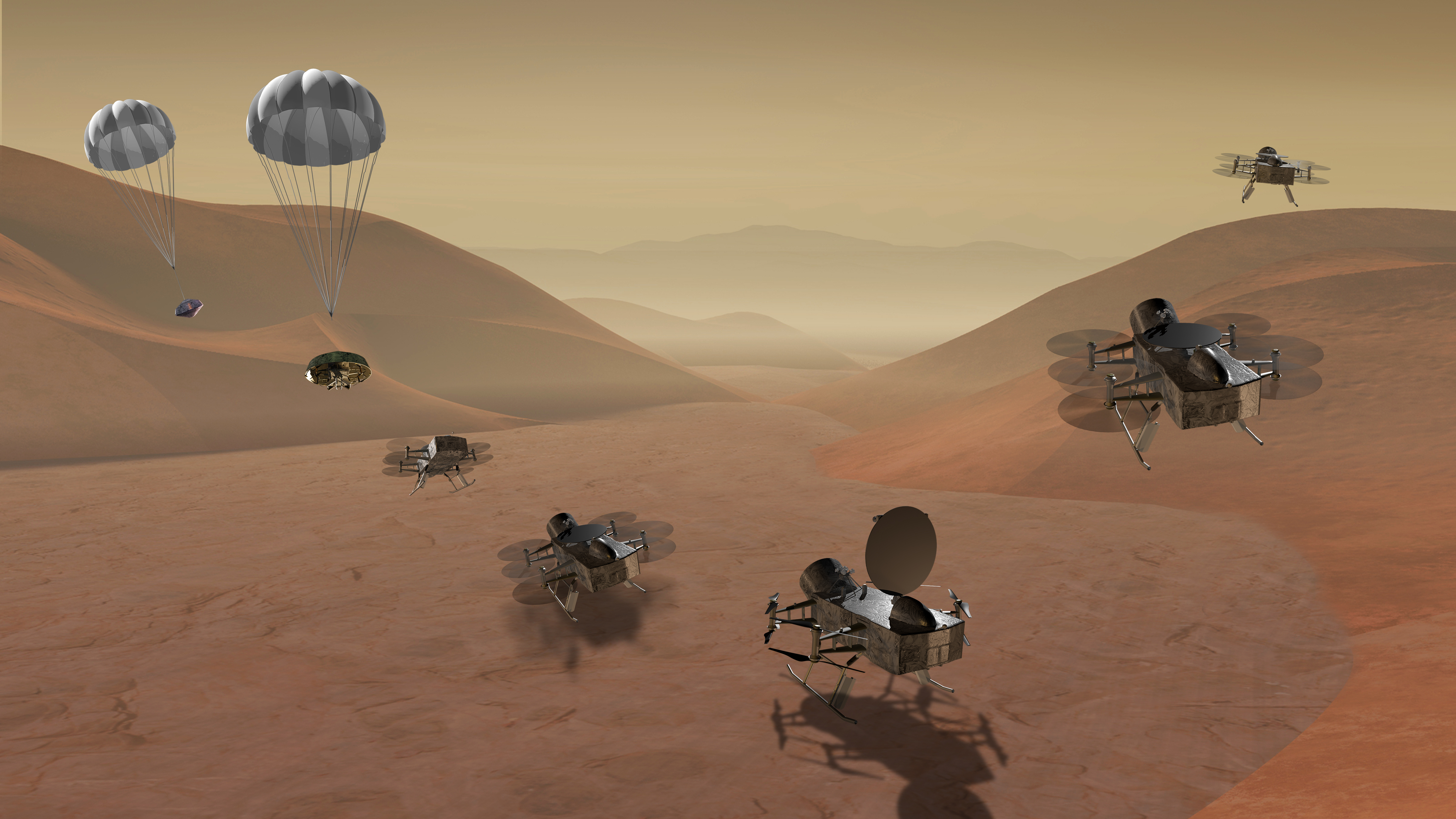
- The rotorcraft Dragonfly probe to Titan is planned to be launched in 2028.

2028 in spaceflight

This article documents expected notable spaceflight events during the year 2028.

NASA plans to launch the Artemis IV mission, which will land astronauts near the south pole of the Moon. It is expected to be the first mission to land humans on the Moon since 1972.

NASA also plans to launch Dragonfly, a robotic rotorcraft probe which will explore Saturn's moon Titan, and Space Reactor‑1 Freedom (SR-1 Freedom), a nuclear electric propulsion spacecraft which will send Skyfall—three Ingenuity-class helicopters—to Mars.

Russia expects to launch the Luna 26 lunar orbiter in 2028.

Chang'e 8, the last mission before China’s moon base begins construction, is planned to launch.

The first uncrewed flight of Orel, Russia's replacement for the crewed Soyuz spacecraft, is scheduled for 2028.

India plans to launch the first module for the Bharatiya Antariksha Station in 2028. India also plans to launch the Chandrayaan-4 and LUPEX lunar missions.

ESA expects to launch the Rosalind Franklin rover to Mars on an American commercial launch vehicle.

== Orbital launches ==
- ← Jan
- Feb
- Mar
- Apr
- May
- Jun
- Jul
- Aug
- Sep
- Oct
- Nov
- Dec →

Date and time (UTC)	Rocket	Flight number	Launch site		LSP	
Date and time (UTC)	Payload (⚀ = CubeSat)	Operator	Orbit	Function	Decay (UTC)	Outcome
Date and time (UTC)	Remarks					
← Jan; Feb; Mar; Apr; May; Jun; Jul; Aug; Sep; Oct; Nov; Dec →; === March ===
3 March	(Japan) H3		(Japan) Tanegashima LA-Y2		(Japan) MHI	
3 March	(United Arab Emirates) MBR Explorer	UAESA	Heliocentric	Asteroid flyby and landing		
3 March	Emirates Mission to the Asteroid Belt (EMA).					
March (TBD)	(India) LVM3		(India) Satish Dhawan SLP		(India) ISRO	
March (TBD)	(India) VOM (Shukrayaan)	ISRO	Cytherocentric	Venusian orbiter		
March (TBD)	(Italy) Vega-C		(France) Kourou ELV		(France) Arianespace	
March (TBD)	Sentinel CO2M-B	ESA	Low Earth (SSO)	Earth observation		
March (TBD)	First satellite of the Copernicus Anthropogenic Carbon Dioxide Monitoring mission. Part of the European Space Agency's Copernicus Programme.					
Q1 (TBD)	(United States) SLS Block 1		(United States) Kennedy LC-39B		(United States) NASA	
Q1 (TBD)	(United States) Artemis IV	NASA	Selenocentric	Crewed lunar landing		
Q1 (TBD)	Third crewed Orion flight and first crewed lunar landing since Apollo 17 in 1972.					
Q1 (TBD)	(Italy) Vega C		(France) Korou ELV		(France) Arianespace	
Q1 (TBD)	(France) Pléiades Neo Next 1	Airbus Defence and Space	Low Earth orbit	Earth observation satellite		
Q1 (TBD)	(United States) Falcon 9 Block 5		(United States) Cape Canaveral SLC-40		(United States) SpaceX	
Q1 (TBD)	(United States) TBA	TBA	Geosynchronous	TBA		
Q1 (TBD)	Dedicated SmallSat Rideshare mission to GTO orbit by SEOPS (Waymaker-1).					
Q1 (TBD)	(United States) Falcon 9 Block 5		(United States) Cape Canaveral SLC-40		(United States) SpaceX	
Q1 (TBD)	TBA	TBA	TBA	TBA		
Q1 (TBD)	Bandwagon-7					
← Jan; Feb; Mar; Apr; May; Jun; Jul; Aug; Sep; Oct; Nov; Dec →; === April ===
20 April	(Japan) H3-24S		(Japan) Tanegashima LA-Y2		(Japan) MHI	
20 April	(Japan) DESTINY+	JAXA	Heliocentric	Asteroid flyby		
20 April	(Japan) Ramses	ESA and JAXA	Heliocentric	Asteroid probe		
20 April	DESTINY+ and Ramses aims to conduct flybys of 99942 Apophis. DESTINY+ also aims to conduct a flyby of 3200 Phaethon in 2030.					
April (TBD)	(India) PSLV-XL		(India) Satish Dhawan		(India) ISRO	
April (TBD)	(India) HRSAT-1A	ISRO	Low Earth	Earth observation		
April (TBD)	(India) HRSAT-1B	ISRO	Low Earth	Earth observation		
April (TBD)	(India) HRSAT-1C	ISRO	Low Earth	Earth observation		
← Jan; Feb; Mar; Apr; May; Jun; Jul; Aug; Sep; Oct; Nov; Dec →; === June ===
June (TBD)	(United States) Falcon 9 Block 5		(United States) Cape Canaveral SLC-40		(United States) SpaceX	
June (TBD)	(United States) NEO Surveyor	(United States) NASA	Sun-Earth L1	Planetary defence		
Q2 (TBD)	(Italy) Vega-C		(France) Kourou ELV		(France) Arianespace	
Q2 (TBD)	Space Rider F1	ESA	Low Earth	Flight test		
Q2 (TBD)	First test flight of ESA's Space Rider uncrewed spaceplane.					
← Jan; Feb; Mar; Apr; May; Jun; Jul; Aug; Sep; Oct; Nov; Dec →; === July ===
5 July	(United States) Falcon Heavy		(United States) Kennedy LC-39A		(United States) SpaceX	
5 July	(United States) Dragonfly	NASA	Heliocentric (to Saturn)	Exploration of Titan		
5 July	Rotorcraft probe to fly in the atmosphere of Saturn's moon Titan.					
← Jan; Feb; Mar; Apr; May; Jun; Jul; Aug; Sep; Oct; Nov; Dec →; === August ===
August (TBD)	(France) Ariane 64		(France) Kourou ELA-4		(France) Arianespace	
August (TBD)	Comet Interceptor Mission	ESA	Sun-Earth L2	Asteroid fly-by		
← Jan; Feb; Mar; Apr; May; Jun; Jul; Aug; Sep; Oct; Nov; Dec →; === September ===
Q3 (TBD)	(United States) Vulcan Centaur		(United States) Cape Canaveral SLC-41		(United States) ULA	
Q3 (TBD)	(United States) LDPE-5 (ROOSTER-5/GAS-T)	U.S. Space Force	Geosynchronous	Technology demonstration		
Q3 (TBD)	(United States) Tetra-6	U.S. Space Force	Geosynchronous	Technology demonstration		
Q3 (TBD)	USSF-70 Mission.					
← Jan; Feb; Mar; Apr; May; Jun; Jul; Aug; Sep; Oct; Nov; Dec →; === October ===
October (TBD)	(United States) Falcon Heavy		(United States) Kennedy LC-39A		(United States) TBA	
October (TBD)	EDLM	ESA	TMI to Martian surface	Mars lander		
October (TBD)	Rosalind Franklin	ESA	TMI to Martian surface	Mars rover		
← Jan; Feb; Mar; Apr; May; Jun; Jul; Aug; Sep; Oct; Nov; Dec →; === November ===
November (TBD)	(France) Ariane 64		(France) Kourou ELA-4		(France) Arianespace	
November (TBD)	Nyx ALADDIN	ESA and The Exploration Company	Low Earth orbit (ISS)	Technology demonstration		
← Jan; Feb; Mar; Apr; May; Jun; Jul; Aug; Sep; Oct; Nov; Dec →; === December ===
December (TBD)	(United States) Falcon 9 Block 5		(United States) Cape Canaveral SLC-40		(United States) SpaceX	
December (TBD)	(United States) GRACE-C	NASA	Low Earth (Polar Orbit)	Meteorology		
December (TBD)	Rideshare mission with NASA's GRACE-C as primary payload					
Q4 (TBD)	(United States) SLS Block 1		(United States) Kennedy LC-39B		(United States) NASA	
Q4 (TBD)	(United States) Artemis V	NASA	Selenocentric to Lunar south pole	Crewed lunar landing		
Q4 (TBD)	Second crewed lunar landing of the Artemis program.					
Q4 (TBD)	(United States) Falcon 9 Block 5		(United States) Cape Canaveral SLC-40		(United States) SpaceX	
Q4 (TBD)	(Thailand) Thaicom 10	Thaicom	Geosynchronous	Communications		
Q4 (TBD)	(United States) Terran R		(United States) Cape Canaveral LC-16		(United States) Relativity Space	
Q4 (TBD)	(United States) Aeolus orbiter mission	Relativity Space	Areocentric orbit	Mars orbiter		
Q1 (TBD)	(United States) Falcon 9 Block 5		(United States) Cape Canaveral SLC-40		(United States) SpaceX	
Q1 (TBD)	(United States) TBA	TBA	Geosynchronous	TBA		
Q1 (TBD)	Waymaker-2					
Q4 (TBD)	(United States) New Glenn		(United States) Cape Canaveral LC-36A		(United States) Blue Origin	
Q4 (TBD)	(United States) Mars Telecommunications Network	NASA and Blue Origin	Areocentric	Mars Orbiter		
Q4 (TBD)	(United States) New Glenn		(United States) Cape Canaveral LC-36A		(United States) Blue Origin	
Q4 (TBD)	(United States) PROMISE	NASA	TLI to Lunar south pole	Lunar rover		
Q4 (TBD)	(United States) Neutron		(United States) Wallops LC-0D		(United States) Neutron	
Q4 (TBD)	(Finland) ICEYE Launch 1	ICEYE	Low Earth orbit	Earth observation satellite		
H2 (TBD)	(United States) Falcon 9 Block 5		(United States) Cape Canaveral SLC-40		(United States) SpaceX	
H2 (TBD)	(United Arab Emirates) Al Yah 5	Yahsat	Geosynchronous	Communications		
H2 (TBD)	Replacement for Yahsat 1B (Al Yah 2).					
H2 (TBD)	(France) Ariane 64		(France) Kourou ELA-4		(France) Arianespace	
H2 (TBD)	(South Korea) Koreasat 9	KT Sat	GTO	Communications satellite		
← Jan; Feb; Mar; Apr; May; Jun; Jul; Aug; Sep; Oct; Nov; Dec →; === To be determined ===
2028 (TBD)	(Russia) Soyuz-2.1b / Fregat-M		(Russia) Vostochny Site 1S		(Russia) Roscosmos	
2028 (TBD)	(Russia) Luna 27	Roscosmos	TLI to Lunar south pole	Lunar lander		
2028 (TBD)	(China) Long March 5		(China) Wenchang LC-101		(China) CASC	
2028 (TBD)	(China) Tianwen-3 Lander/Ascent Module	CNSA	TMI to Martian surface	Martian lander		
2028 (TBD)	(China) Tianwen-3 Orbiter/Earth-return Module	CNSA	Mars orbit	Mars orbiter		
2028 (TBD)	(Russia) Soyuz-2.1a / Fregat		(Russia) Vostochny Site 1S		(Russia) Roscosmos	
2028 (TBD)	(Russia) (Belarus) RBKA №1	Roscosmos and National Academy of Sciences of Belarus	Low Earth	Earth observation		
2028 (TBD)	RBKA will follow in the footsteps of BKA (Belarusian Satellite), which launched in July 2012.					
2028 (TBD)	(Russia) Amur / Fregat-M		(Russia) Vostochny Site 2A		(Russia) Roscosmos	
2028 (TBD)	(Russia) GVM-M	Roscosmos	Low Earth	Mass simulator		
2028 (TBD)	Maiden flight of Amur (Soyuz-7), a partially reusable methalox launch vehicle.					
2028 (TBD)	(Italy) Vega-C		(France) Kourou ELV		(France) Arianespace	
2028 (TBD)	Space Rider F2	ESA	Low Earth	Flight test		
2028 (TBD)	(Russia) Soyuz-2.1b / Fregat-M		(Russia) Vostochny Site 1S		(Russia) Roscosmos	
2028 (TBD)	(Russia) Luna 26	Roscosmos	Selenocentric	Lunar orbiter		
2028 (TBD)	Luna-Glob mission.					
2028 (TBD)	(Russia) Proton-M / Briz-M P4		(Kazakhstan) Baikonur		(Russia) Roscosmos	
2028 (TBD)	(Russia) Ekspress-AMU4	RSCC	Geosynchronous	Communications		
2028 (TBD)	Ekspress-AMU4 will replace Ekspress-AM44.					
2028 (TBD)	(Russia) Angara A5		(Russia) Vostochny Site 1A		(Russia) Roscosmos	
2028 (TBD)	(Russia) Orel	Roscosmos	Low Earth	Flight test		
2028 (TBD)	First uncrewed test flight of Russia's new crewed spacecraft, Orel. First launch of Angara A5 from Vostochny.					
2028 (TBD)	(United States) Atlas V N22		(United States) Cape Canaveral SLC-41		(United States) ULA	
2028 (TBD)	(United States) Boeing Starliner-2 (PCM-2)	Boeing and NASA	Low Earth (ISS)	Crewed spaceflight		
2028 (TBD)	Second operational Starliner mission, as part of the Commercial Crew Program.					
2028 (TBD)	(United States) Atlas V N22		(United States) Cape Canaveral SLC-41		(United States) ULA	
2028 (TBD)	(United States) Boeing Starliner-3 (PCM-3)	Boeing and NASA	Low Earth (ISS)	Crewed spaceflight		
2028 (TBD)	Third operational Starliner mission, as part of the Commercial Crew Program.					
2028 (TBD)	(United States) Starship		(United States) Cape Canaveral LC-39A Starship Pad		(United States) SpaceX	
2028 (TBD)	(Japan) Superbird-9	SKY Perfect JSAT	Geosynchronous	Communications		
2028 (TBD)	(Japan) H3		(Japan) Tanegashima LA-Y2		(Japan) MHI	
2028 (TBD)	(India) Chandrayaan-5 Lander	ISRO	TLI to Lunar south pole	Lunar lander		
2028 (TBD)	(Japan) LUPEX Rover	JAXA	TLI to Lunar south pole	Lunar rover		
2028 (TBD)	Lunar Polar Exploration (LUPEX) Mission. It is also Known as Chandrayaan-5.					
2028 (TBD)	(United States) Starship		(United States) Cape Canaveral LC-39A Starship Pad		(United States) SpaceX	
2028 (TBD)	(United States)	SpaceX	TLI to Lunar south pole	Lunar lander		
2028 (TBD)	First uncrewed landing demo of Starship HLS					
2028 (TBD)	(United States) Starship		(United States) Cape Canaveral LC-39A Starship Pad		(United States) SpaceX	
2028 (TBD)	(United States)	SpaceX	TLI to Lunar south pole	Crewed lunar landing		
2028 (TBD)	First crewed landing of Starship HLS					
2028 (TBD)	(United States) Terran R		(United States) Cape Canaveral LC-16		(United States) Relativity Space	
2028 (TBD)	(United States) Impulse Space's Mars Mission	Impulse Space	TMI to Martian surface	Mars lander		
2028 (TBD)	(United States) New Glenn		(United States) Cape Canaveral LC-36		(United States) Blue Origin	
2028 (TBD)	(United States)	Blue Origin	TLI to Lunar south pole	Lunar lander		
2028 (TBD)	First uncrewed landing demo of Blue Moon					
2028 (TBD)	(United States) New Glenn		(United States) Cape Canaveral LC-36		(United States) Blue Origin	
2028 (TBD)	(United States)	Blue Origin	TLI to Lunar south pole	Crewed lunar landing		
2028 (TBD)	First crewed landing of Blue Moon					
2028 (TBD)	(United States) Falcon 9 Block 5		(United States)		(United States) SpaceX	
2028 (TBD)	(Canada) Lightspeed × 18	Telesat	Low Earth (SSO)	Communications		
2028 (TBD)	Sixth of 14 Falcon 9 launches for Telesat's Lightspeed LEO constellation.					
2028 (TBD)	(United States) Falcon 9 Block 5		(United States)		(United States) SpaceX	
2028 (TBD)	(Canada) Lightspeed × 18	Telesat	Low Earth (SSO)	Communications		
2028 (TBD)	Seventh of 14 Falcon 9 launches for Telesat's Lightspeed LEO constellation.					
2028 (TBD)	(United States) Falcon 9 Block 5		(United States)		(United States) SpaceX	
2028 (TBD)	(Canada) Lightspeed × 18	Telesat	Low Earth (SSO)	Communications		
2028 (TBD)	Eighth of 14 Falcon 9 launches for Telesat's Lightspeed LEO constellation.					
2028 (TBD)	(United States) Falcon 9 Block 5		(United States)		(United States) SpaceX	
2028 (TBD)	(Canada) Lightspeed × 18	Telesat	Low Earth (SSO)	Communications		
2028 (TBD)	Ninth of 14 Falcon 9 launches for Telesat's Lightspeed LEO constellation.					
2028 (TBD)	(United States) Falcon 9 Block 5		(United States)		(United States) SpaceX	
2028 (TBD)	(Canada) Lightspeed × 18	Telesat	Low Earth (SSO)	Communications		
2028 (TBD)	Tenth of 14 Falcon 9 launches for Telesat's Lightspeed LEO constellation.					
2028 (TBD)	(United States) Falcon 9 Block 5		(United States)		(United States) SpaceX	
2028 (TBD)	(Canada) Lightspeed × 18	Telesat	Low Earth (SSO)	Communications		
2028 (TBD)	Eleventh of 14 Falcon 9 launches for Telesat's Lightspeed LEO constellation.					
2028 (TBD)	(United States) Falcon 9 Block 5		(United States)		(United States) SpaceX	
2028 (TBD)	(Canada) Lightspeed × 18	Telesat	Low Earth (SSO)	Communications		
2028 (TBD)	Twelfth of 14 Falcon 9 launches for Telesat's Lightspeed LEO constellation.					
2028 (TBD)	(United States) Falcon 9 Block 5		(United States)		(United States) SpaceX	
2028 (TBD)	(Canada) Lightspeed × 18	Telesat	Low Earth (SSO)	Communications		
2028 (TBD)	Thirteenth of 14 Falcon 9 launches for Telesat's Lightspeed LEO constellation.					
2028 (TBD)	(United States) Falcon 9 Block 5		(United States)		(United States) SpaceX	
2028 (TBD)	(Canada) Lightspeed × 18	Telesat	Low Earth (SSO)	Communications		
2028 (TBD)	Fourteenth of 14 Falcon 9 launches for Telesat's Lightspeed LEO constellation.					
2028 (TBD)	(France) Ariane 64		(France) Kourou ELA-4		(France) Arianespace	
2028 (TBD)	(United States) Intelsat IS-45	Intelsat	Geosynchronous	Communications		
2028 (TBD)	(United States) Vulcan Centaur		(United States) Cape Canaveral SLC-41		(United States) ULA	
2028 (TBD)	(United States) GPS IIIF-1	U.S. Space Force	Medium Earth	Navigation		
2028 (TBD)	(France) Ariane 64	LE-12	(France) Kourou ELA-4		(France) Arianespace	
2028 (TBD)	(United States) LeoSat ×35	Amazon Leo	Low Earth	Communications		
2028 (TBD)	(France) Ariane 64	LE-13	(France) Kourou ELA-4		(France) Arianespace	
2028 (TBD)	(United States) LeoSat ×35	Amazon Leo	Low Earth	Communications		
2028 (TBD)	(France) Ariane 64	LE-14	(France) Kourou ELA-4		(France) Arianespace	
2028 (TBD)	(United States) LeoSat ×35	Amazon Leo	Low Earth	Communications		
2028 (TBD)	(France) Ariane 64	LE-15	(France) Kourou ELA-4		(France) Arianespace	
2028 (TBD)	(United States) LeoSat ×35	Amazon Leo	Low Earth	Communications		
2028 (TBD)	(France) Ariane 64	LE-16	(France) Kourou ELA-4		(France) Arianespace	
2028 (TBD)	(United States) LeoSat ×35	Amazon Leo	Low Earth	Communications		
2028 (TBD)	(France) Ariane 64	LE-17	(France) Kourou ELA-4		(France) Arianespace	
2028 (TBD)	(United States) LeoSat ×35	Amazon Leo	Low Earth	Communications		
2028 (TBD)	(France) Ariane 64	LE-18	(France) Kourou ELA-4		(France) Arianespace	
2028 (TBD)	(United States) LeoSat ×35	Amazon Leo	Low Earth	Communications		
2028 (TBD)	(United States) Vulcan Centaur VC6L	LV-23	(United States) Cape Canaveral SLC-41		(United States) ULA	
2028 (TBD)	(United States) LeoSat × 45	Amazon Leo	Low Earth	Communications		
2028 (TBD)	(United States) Vulcan Centaur VC6L	LV-24	(United States) Cape Canaveral SLC-41		(United States) ULA	
2028 (TBD)	(United States) LeoSat × 45	Amazon Leo	Low Earth	Communications		
2028 (TBD)	(United States) Vulcan Centaur VC6L	LV-25	(United States) Cape Canaveral SLC-41		(United States) ULA	
2028 (TBD)	(United States) LeoSat × 45	Amazon Leo	Low Earth	Communications		
2028 (TBD)	(United States) Vulcan Centaur VC6L	LV-26	(United States) Cape Canaveral SLC-41		(United States) ULA	
2028 (TBD)	(United States) LeoSat × 45	Amazon Leo	Low Earth	Communications		
2028 (TBD)	(United States) Vulcan Centaur VC6L	LV-27	(United States) Cape Canaveral SLC-41		(United States) ULA	
2028 (TBD)	(United States) LeoSat × 45	Amazon Leo	Low Earth	Communications		
2028 (TBD)	(United States) Vulcan Centaur VC6L	LV-28	(United States) Cape Canaveral SLC-41		(United States) ULA	
2028 (TBD)	(United States) LeoSat × 45	Amazon Leo	Low Earth	Communications		
2028 (TBD)	(United States) Vulcan Centaur VC6L	LV-29	(United States) Cape Canaveral SLC-41		(United States) ULA	
2028 (TBD)	(United States) LeoSat × 45	Amazon Leo	Low Earth	Communications		
2028 (TBD)	(United States) Vulcan Centaur VC6L	LV-30	(United States) Cape Canaveral SLC-41		(United States) ULA	
2028 (TBD)	(United States) LeoSat × 45	Amazon Leo	Low Earth	Communications		
2028 (TBD)	(United States) Vulcan Centaur VC6L	LV-31	(United States) Cape Canaveral SLC-41		(United States) ULA	
2028 (TBD)	(United States) LeoSat × 45	Amazon Leo	Low Earth	Communications		
2028 (TBD)	(United States) Vulcan Centaur VC6L	LV-32	(United States) Cape Canaveral SLC-41		(United States) ULA	
2028 (TBD)	(United States) LeoSat × 45	Amazon Leo	Low Earth	Communications		
2028 (TBD)	(United States) Vulcan Centaur VC6L	LV-33	(United States) Cape Canaveral SLC-41		(United States) ULA	
2028 (TBD)	(United States) LeoSat × 45	Amazon Leo	Low Earth	Communications		
2028 (TBD)	(United States) Vulcan Centaur VC6L	LV-34	(United States) Cape Canaveral SLC-41		(United States) ULA	
2028 (TBD)	(United States) LeoSat × 45	Amazon Leo	Low Earth	Communications		
2028 (TBD)	(United States) Vulcan Centaur VC6L	LV-35	(United States) Cape Canaveral SLC-41		(United States) ULA	
2028 (TBD)	(United States) LeoSat × 45	Amazon Leo	Low Earth	Communications		
2028 (TBD)	(United States) Vulcan Centaur VC6L	LV-36	(United States) Cape Canaveral SLC-41		(United States) ULA	
2028 (TBD)	(United States) LeoSat × 45	Amazon Leo	Low Earth	Communications		
2028 (TBD)	(United States) Vulcan Centaur VC6L	LV-37	(United States) Cape Canaveral SLC-41		(United States) ULA	
2028 (TBD)	(United States) LeoSat × 45	Amazon Leo	Low Earth	Communications		
2028 (TBD)	(United States) Vulcan Centaur VC6L	LV-38	(United States) Cape Canaveral SLC-41		(United States) ULA	
2028 (TBD)	(United States) LeoSat × 45	Amazon Leo	Low Earth	Communications		
2028 (TBD)	(Italy) Vega-C		(France) Kourou ELV		(France) Arianespace	
2028 (TBD)	FORUM	ESA	Low Earth (SSO)	Earth observation		
2028 (TBD)	Ninth Earth Explorer mission for ESA's Living Planet Programme. FORUM will fly in a loose sun-synchronous tandem formation with MetOp-SG A1.					
2028 (TBD)	(Italy) Vega-C		(France) Kourou ELV		(France) Arianespace	
2028 (TBD)	(Luxembourg) (European Union) Eagle-1	SES	Low Earth	Quantum key distribution		
2028 (TBD)	(Italy) Vega-C		(France) Kourou ELV		(France) Arianespace	
2028 (TBD)	ALTIUS	ESA	Low Earth (SSO)	Earth observation		
2028 (TBD)	(Germany) Spectrum		(Norway) Andøya		(Germany) Isar Aerospace	
2028 (TBD)	(Norway) AOS-Demo	Norwegian Space Agency	Low Earth	Earth observation satellite		
2028 (TBD)	(Norway) AOS-Precursor	Norwegian Space Agency	Low Earth	Earth observation satellite		
2028 (TBD)	(United States) Vulcan Centaur		(United States) Cape Canaveral SLC-41		(United States) ULA	
2028 (TBD)	(United States) GPS IIIF-2	U.S. Space Force	Medium Earth	Navigation		
2028 (TBD)	USSF-49 Mission.					
2028 (TBD)	(United States) Vulcan Centaur		(United States) Cape Canaveral SLC-41		(United States) ULA	
2028 (TBD)	(United States) GPS IIIF-3	U.S. Space Force	Medium Earth	Navigation		
2028 (TBD)	USSF-15 Mission.					
2028 (TBD)	(United States) Falcon 9 Block 5 / Helios		(United States) Cape Canaveral SLC-40		(United States) SpaceX	
2028 (TBD)	(Peru) Andesat-1	Andesat	Low Earth to Geosynchronous	Communications		
2028 (TBD)	(Argentina) Orbith-1	Orbith	Low Earth to Geosynchronous	Communications		
2028 (TBD)	(United States) TBA	Astranis	Low Earth to Geosynchronous	Communications		
2028 (TBD)	(United States) TBA	Astranis	Low Earth to Geosynchronous	Communications		
2028 (TBD)	(United States) TBA	Astranis	Low Earth to Geosynchronous	Communications		
2028 (TBD)	(United States) TBA	Astranis	Low Earth to Geosynchronous	Communications		
2028 (TBD)	Astranis Block 4 mission.					
2028 (TBD)	(United States) Electron		(New Zealand) Mahia LC-1A		(United States) Rocket Lab	
2028 (TBD)	(Japan) StriX-22	Synspective	Low Earth	Earth observation		
2028 (TBD)	(United States) Electron		(New Zealand) Mahia LC-1A		(United States) Rocket Lab	
2028 (TBD)	(Japan) StriX-23	Synspective	Low Earth	Earth observation		
2028 (TBD)	(United States) Electron		(New Zealand) Mahia LC-1A		(United States) Rocket Lab	
2028 (TBD)	(Japan) StriX-24	Synspective	Low Earth	Earth observation		
2028 (TBD)	(United States) Electron		(New Zealand) Mahia LC-1A		(United States) Rocket Lab	
2028 (TBD)	(Japan) StriX-25	Synspective	Low Earth	Earth observation		
2028 (TBD)	(United States) Electron		(New Zealand) Mahia LC-1A		(United States) Rocket Lab	
2028 (TBD)	(Japan) StriX-26	Synspective	Low Earth	Earth observation		
2028 (TBD)	(United States) Vulcan Centaur		(United States) Cape Canaveral SLC-41		(United States) ULA	
2028 (TBD)	(United States) GPS IIIF-4	U.S. Space Force	Medium Earth	Navigation		
2028 (TBD)	USSF-88 Mission.					
2028 (TBD)	(United States) Falcon Heavy		(United States) Kennedy LC-39A		(United States) SpaceX	
2028 (TBD)	(United States) WGS-12	U.S. Space Force	Geosynchronous	Military communications		
2028 (TBD)	USSF-206 Mission.					
2028 (TBD)	(United States) Falcon Heavy		(United States) Kennedy LC-39A		(United States) SpaceX	
2028 (TBD)	(United States) EchoStar XXVI	EchoStar	Geosynchronous	Communications		
2028 (TBD)	(Germany) Spectrum		(Norway) Andøya		(Germany) Isar Aerospace	
2028 (TBD)	TBA	TBA	Low Earth	TBA		
2028 (TBD)	Rideshare mission by SEOPS					
2028 (TBD)	(Italy) Vega C		(France) Korou ELV		(France) Arianespace	
2028 (TBD)	(Taiwan) Formosat-9A	TASA	Low Earth (SSO)	Earth observation satellite		
2028 (TBD)	(Italy) Vega C		(United States) Vandenberg SLC-4E		(United States) SpaceX	
2028 (TBD)	(Taiwan) FORMOSAT-8B/GTM	TASA	Low Earth (SSO)	Earth observation/Gamma-ray astronomy		
2028 (TBD)	Dedicated SmallSat Rideshare mission to sun-synchronous orbit, designated Transporter-19.					
2028 (TBD)	(United States) New Glenn	LN-13	(United States) Cape Canaveral LC-36		(United States) Blue Origin	
2028 (TBD)	(United States) KuiperSat × 49	Amazon Leo	Low Earth	Communications		
2028 (TBD)	Thirteenth of 24 New Glenn launches for Amazon's Amazon Leo.					
2028 (TBD)	(United States) New Glenn	LN-14	(United States) Cape Canaveral LC-36		(United States) Blue Origin	
2028 (TBD)	(United States) KuiperSat × 49	Amazon Leo	Low Earth	Communications		
2028 (TBD)	Fourteenth of 24 New Glenn launches for Amazon's Amazon Leo.					
2028 (TBD)	(United States) New Glenn	LN-15	(United States) Cape Canaveral LC-36		(United States) Blue Origin	
2028 (TBD)	(United States) KuiperSat × 49	Amazon Leo	Low Earth	Communications		
2028 (TBD)	Fifteenth of 24 New Glenn launches for Amazon's Amazon Leo.					
2028 (TBD)	(United States) New Glenn	LN-16	(United States) Cape Canaveral LC-36		(United States) Blue Origin	
2028 (TBD)	(United States) KuiperSat × 49	Amazon Leo	Low Earth	Communications		
2028 (TBD)	Sixteenth of 24 New Glenn launches for Amazon's Amazon Leo.					
2028 (TBD)	(United States) New Glenn	LN-17	(United States) Cape Canaveral LC-36		(United States) Blue Origin	
2028 (TBD)	(United States) KuiperSat × 49	Amazon Leo	Low Earth	Communications		
2028 (TBD)	Seventeenth of 24 New Glenn launches for Amazon's Amazon Leo.					
2028 (TBD)	(United States) New Glenn	LN-18	(United States) Cape Canaveral LC-36		(United States) Blue Origin	
2028 (TBD)	(United States) KuiperSat × 49	Amazon Leo	Low Earth	Communications		
2028 (TBD)	Eigteenth of 24 New Glenn launches for Amazon's Amazon Leo.					
2028 (TBD)	(United States) New Glenn	LN-19	(United States) Cape Canaveral LC-36		(United States) Blue Origin	
2028 (TBD)	(United States) KuiperSat × 49	Amazon Leo	Low Earth	Communications		
2028 (TBD)	Ninteenth of 24 New Glenn launches for Amazon's Amazon Leo.					
2028 (TBD)	(United States) New Glenn	LN-20	(United States) Cape Canaveral LC-36		(United States) Blue Origin	
2028 (TBD)	(United States) KuiperSat × 49	Amazon Leo	Low Earth	Communications		
2028 (TBD)	Twentieth of 24 New Glenn launches for Amazon's Amazon Leo.					
2028 (TBD)	(United States) New Glenn	LN-21	(United States) Cape Canaveral LC-36		(United States) Blue Origin	
2028 (TBD)	(United States) KuiperSat × 49	Amazon Leo	Low Earth	Communications		
2028 (TBD)	Twenty-first of 24 New Glenn launches for Amazon's Amazon Leo.					
2028 (TBD)	(United States) New Glenn	LN-22	(United States) Cape Canaveral LC-36		(United States) Blue Origin	
2028 (TBD)	(United States) KuiperSat × 49	Amazon Leo	Low Earth	Communications		
2028 (TBD)	Twenty-second of 24 New Glenn launches for Amazon's Amazon Leo.					
2028 (TBD)	(United States) New Glenn	LN-23	(United States) Cape Canaveral LC-36		(United States) Blue Origin	
2028 (TBD)	(United States) KuiperSat × 49	Amazon Leo	Low Earth	Communications		
2028 (TBD)	Twenty-third of 24 New Glenn launches for Amazon's Amazon Leo.					
2028 (TBD)	(United States) New Glenn	LN-24	(United States) Cape Canaveral LC-36		(United States) Blue Origin	
2028 (TBD)	(United States) KuiperSat × 49	Amazon Leo	Low Earth	Communications		
2028 (TBD)	Twenty-fourth of 24 New Glenn launches for Amazon's Amazon Leo.					
2028 (TBD)	(Germany) Spectrum		(Norway) Andøya		(Germany) Isar Aerospace	
2028 (TBD)	(Japan) ELSA-M	Astroscale	Low Earth	Space debris removal		
2028 (TBD)	(United States) Falcon 9 Block 5		(United States) Cape Canaveral or Vandenburg		(United States) SpaceX	
2028 (TBD)	(Norway) Exo-2	Exolaunch	Low Earth orbit	Rideshare		
2028 (TBD)	Rideshare mission by Exolaunch					
2028 (TBD)	(United States) New Glenn		(United States) Cape Canaveral LC-36		(United States) Blue Origin	
2028 (TBD)	(United States) CLV-1	Astrolab	TLI to Lunar south pole	Lunar Terrain Vehicle		
2028 (TBD)	Astrolab's Crewed Lunar Vehicle, or CLV‑1, adapted from the company’s FLEX architecture, is a crewed Lunar Terrain Vehicle (LTV) designed to transport astronauts, carry supplies, and support remote operations, with a compact stowed configuration, a mass of about 2000 pounds, and the ability to reach more than 6 mph on level terrain.					
2028 (TBD)	(United States) New Glenn		(United States) Cape Canaveral LC-36		(United States) Blue Origin	
2028 (TBD)	(United States) Pegasus	Lunar Outpost	TLI to Lunar south pole	Lunar Terrain Vehicle		
2028 (TBD)	Lunar Outpost's Pegasus is a lighter, mission‑ready evolution of its Eagle rover designed explicitly to meet NASA’s updated crewed LTV requirements. Operational for up to a year and capable of manual, autonomous, or teleoperated driving at speeds more than 9 mph, Pegasus incorporates Apollo‑heritage technologies and builds on prototype and flight experience to deliver human‑centered mobility essential for establishing a sustained Moon Base.					
2028 (TBD)	(United States) Terran R		(United States) Cape Canaveral LC-16		(United States) Relativity Space	
2028 (TBD)	(United States) Lazuli Space Observatory (LSO)	Schmidt Sciences	Highly elliptical	Astronomy		
2028 (TBD)	(United States) Antares 330		(United States) Wallops LP-0A		(United States) Northrop Grumman	
2028 (TBD)	(United States) Cygnus NG-26	NASA	Low Earth (ISS)	ISS logistics		
2028 (TBD)	(United States) Antares 330		(United States) Wallops LP-0A		(United States) Northrop Grumman	
2028 (TBD)	(United States) Cygnus NG-27	NASA	Low Earth (ISS)	ISS logistics		
2028 (TBD)	(Japan) H3-22S		(Japan) Tanegashima Space Center LA-Y2		(Japan) MHI	
2028 (TBD)	(Japan) ULTRA	ispace	TLI to lunar surface	Lunar lander		
2028 (TBD)	ispace Mission 3. First flight of ispace's ULTRA lunar lander.					
2028 (TBD)	(United States) Electron		(New Zealand) Mahia LC-1		(United States) Rocket Lab	
2028 (TBD)	(Japan) iQPS Mission 17	iQPS	Low Earth	Earth observation satellite		
2028 (TBD)	(United States) Electron		(New Zealand) Mahia LC-1		(United States) Rocket Lab	
2028 (TBD)	(Japan) iQPS Mission 18	iQPS	Low Earth	Earth observation satellite		
2028 (TBD)	(United States) Neutron		(United States) Wallops LC-0D		(United States) Neutron	
2028 (TBD)	(Canada)	Kepler Communications	Low Earth orbit	Communications satellite		
2028 (TBD)	(India) GSLV Mk II		(India) Satish Dhawan SLP		(India) ISRO	
2028 (TBD)	(India) NVS-06	ISRO	Geosynchronous	Navigation		
2028 (TBD)	Sixth satellite of India's next generation NaVic consetellation.					
2028 (TBD)	(United States) Falcon 9		(United States) TBA		(United States) SpaceX	
2028 (TBD)	(United States) Motus Via Sol	Portal Space Systems	TBA	Technology demonstration		
2028 (TBD)	Rideshare mission with Portal Space Systems' first Supernova spacecraft as the primary payload					
2028 (TBD)	(France) Ariane 64		(France) Kourou ELA-4		(France) Arianespace	
2028 (TBD)	(United States) OneWeb	Eutelsat	Low earth (Polar orbit)	Communications satellite		
2028 (TBD)	(Japan) H3		(Japan) Tanegashima LA-Y2		(Japan) MHI	
2028 (TBD)	(Japan) IGS-Optical Diversification 2	CSICE	Low Earth (SSO)	Reconnaissance		
2028 (TBD)	(United States) Falcon 9		(United States) Cape Canaveral SLC-40		(United States) SpaceX	
2028 (TBD)	(United States) Crew-16	NASA	Low Earth orbit (ISS)	ISS Crew Transport		
2028 (TBD)	(United States) Falcon 9		(United States) Cape Canaveral SLC-40		(United States) SpaceX	
2028 (TBD)	(United States) Crew-17	NASA	Low Earth orbit (ISS)	ISS Crew Transport		
2028 (TBD)	(United States) Electron		(New Zealand) Mahia LC-1A		(United States) Rocket Lab	
2028 (TBD)	(Japan) StriX-27	Synspective	Low Earth	Earth observation		
2028 (TBD)	(United States) Electron		(New Zealand) Mahia LC-1A		(United States) Rocket Lab	
2028 (TBD)	(Japan) StriX-28	Synspective	Low Earth	Earth observation		
2028 (TBD)	(United States) Electron		(New Zealand) Mahia LC-1A		(United States) Rocket Lab	
2028 (TBD)	(Japan) StriX-29	Synspective	Low Earth	Earth observation		
2028 (TBD)	(United States) Electron		(New Zealand) Mahia LC-1A		(United States) Rocket Lab	
2028 (TBD)	(Japan) StriX-30	Synspective	Low Earth	Earth observation		
2028 (TBD)	(South Korea) Nuri		(South Korea) Naro LC-2		(South Korea) KARI	
2028 (TBD)	(South Korea) CAS500-5	KARI, Ministry of Science and ICT and Ministry of Environment	Low Earth (SSO)	Earth observation		
2028 (TBD)	Fifth CAS500 satellite, dedicated to observation of water resources.					
2028 (TBD)	(United States) Falcon 9 Block 5		(United States)		(United States) SpaceX	
2028 (TBD)	(Canada) Lightspeed × 15	Telesat	Low Earth (SSO)	Communications		
2028 (TBD)	Additional fifteenth Falcon 9 launch for Telesat's Lightspeed LEO constellation.					
2028 (TBD)	(United States) New Glenn		(United States) Cape Canaveral LC-36		(United States) Blue Origin	
2028 (TBD)	(United States) MoonFall	NASA	TLI to Lunar south pole	Lunar rover		
2028 (TBD)	MoonFall is part of the initial phase of NASA’s Moon Base initiative: a rapid series of robotic missions to scout, experiment, and prepare for astronaut surface operations.					
2028 (TBD)	(United States) Falcon 9 Block 5		(United States) Cape Canaveral SLC-40		(United States) SpaceX	
2028 (TBD)	(United States) Altus-2	Intuitive Machines	TLI to Moon orbit	Data relay satellite		
2028 (TBD)	(United States) Altus-3	Intuitive Machines	TLI to Moon orbit	Data relay satellite		
2028 (TBD)	(United States) Altus-4	Intuitive Machines	TLI to Moon orbit	Data relay satellite		
2028 (TBD)	(United States) Altus-5	Intuitive Machines	TLI to Moon orbit	Data relay satellite		
2028 (TBD)	Intuitive Machines' Altus lunar data relay constellation					

- ← Jan
- Feb
- Mar
- Apr
- May
- Jun
- Jul
- Aug
- Sep
- Oct
- Nov
- Dec →

== Suborbital flights ==
Date and time (UTC)	Rocket	Flight number	Launch site		LSP	
Date and time (UTC)	Payload (⚀ = CubeSat)	Operator	Orbit	Function	Decay (UTC)	Outcome
Date and time (UTC)	Remarks					
March (TBD)	(United States) Improved Orion		(Sweden) Esrange		(Germany) MORABA / (Sweden) SNSA	
March (TBD)	(Germany) (Sweden) REXUS-39	DLR / SNSA	Suborbital	Education		
March (TBD)	(United States) Improved Orion		(Sweden) Esrange		(Germany) MORABA / (Sweden) SNSA	
March (TBD)	(Germany) (Sweden) REXUS-40	DLR / SNSA	Suborbital	Education		
October (TBD)	(Germany) Red Kite/Red Kite		(Sweden) Esrange		(Germany) MORABA	
October (TBD)	(Germany) MAPHEUS-19	DLR	Suborbital	Microgravity research		
November (TBD)	(Brazil) VSB-30		(Sweden) Esrange		(Germany) MORABA	
November (TBD)	(Germany) TEXUS-65	DLR / ESA	Suborbital	Microgravity research		
November (TBD)	(Brazil) VSB-30		(Sweden) Esrange		(Germany) MORABA	
November (TBD)	(Germany) TEXUS-66	DLR / ESA	Suborbital	Microgravity research		

== Deep-space rendezvous ==
Date (UTC)	Spacecraft	Event	Remarks
18 April 2028	Lucy	Flyby of asteroid 11351 Leucus	Target altitude 1000 km
23 June	Juno	117th perijove	On the day of this perijove, Juno flew by Amalthea at a distance of 18,495 km.
June 2028	Hayabusa2	Flyby of Earth	Gravity assist
11 November 2028	Lucy	Flyby of asteroid 21900 Orus	Target altitude 1000 km

== Extravehicular activities (EVAs) ==
Start date/time	Duration	End time	Spacecraft	Crew	Remarks

== Orbital launch statistics ==
=== By country ===
For the purposes of this section, the yearly tally of orbital launches by country assigns each flight to the country of origin of the rocket, not to the launch services provider or the spaceport. For example, Soyuz launches by Arianespace in Kourou are counted under Russia because Soyuz-2 is a Russian rocket.

Country	Launches	Successes	Failures	Partial failures
World	0	0	0	0

=== By rocket ===
==== By family ====
Family	Country	Launches	Successes	Failures	Partial failures	Remarks

==== By type ====
Rocket	Country	Family	Launches	Successes	Failures	Partial failures	Remarks

==== By configuration ====
Rocket	Country	Type	Launches	Successes	Failures	Partial failures	Remarks

=== By spaceport ===
Site	Country	Launches	Successes	Failures	Partial failures	Remarks

=== By orbit ===
Orbital regime	Launches	Achieved	Not achieved	Accidentally achieved	Remarks
Transatmospheric	0	0	0	0	
Low Earth	0	0	0	0	
Geosynchronous / transfer	0	0	0	0	
Medium Earth	0	0	0	0	
High Earth	0	0	0	0	
Heliocentric orbit	0	0	0	0	Including planetary transfer orbits

== Expected maiden flights ==
- Dauntless - Vaya Space - USA
