= BeiDou-3 M1 =

Chinese navigation satellites

- Mission type: Navigation
- Operator: CNSA
- COSPAR ID: 2017-069A
- SATCAT no.: 43001

Start of mission
- Launch date: 5 November 2017, 18:04 UTC
- Rocket: Long March 3B/YZ-1
- Launch site: Xichang LC-2

Orbital parameters
- Reference system: Geocentric
- Regime: Medium Earth orbit
- Perigee altitude: 21,511.3 km
- Apogee altitude: 21,558.9 km
- Inclination: 55.1 °
- Period: 773.2 minutes

Beidou-3 M1 is one of a pair of two Chinese navigation satellites launched in November 2017 as part of the BeiDou satellite navigation system. It was launched with BeiDou-3 M2.

BeiDou-3 M1/M2 were launched from LC2 at Xichang Satellite Launch Center 64 kilometres northwest of Xichang, Liangshan Yi Autonomous Prefecture in Sichuan, China A Long March 3B carrier rocket with a YZ-1 upper stage was used to perform the launch which took place at 11:45 UTC on 5 November 2017. The launch successfully placed the satellites into Medium Earth orbit. It later received the international designator 2017-069A. The United States Space Command assigned it the Satellite Catalog Number 43001.

It is in orbital plane A in orbital slot 7.

== See also ==
- List of BeiDou satellites
- List of Long March launches
