= 2029 in spaceflight =

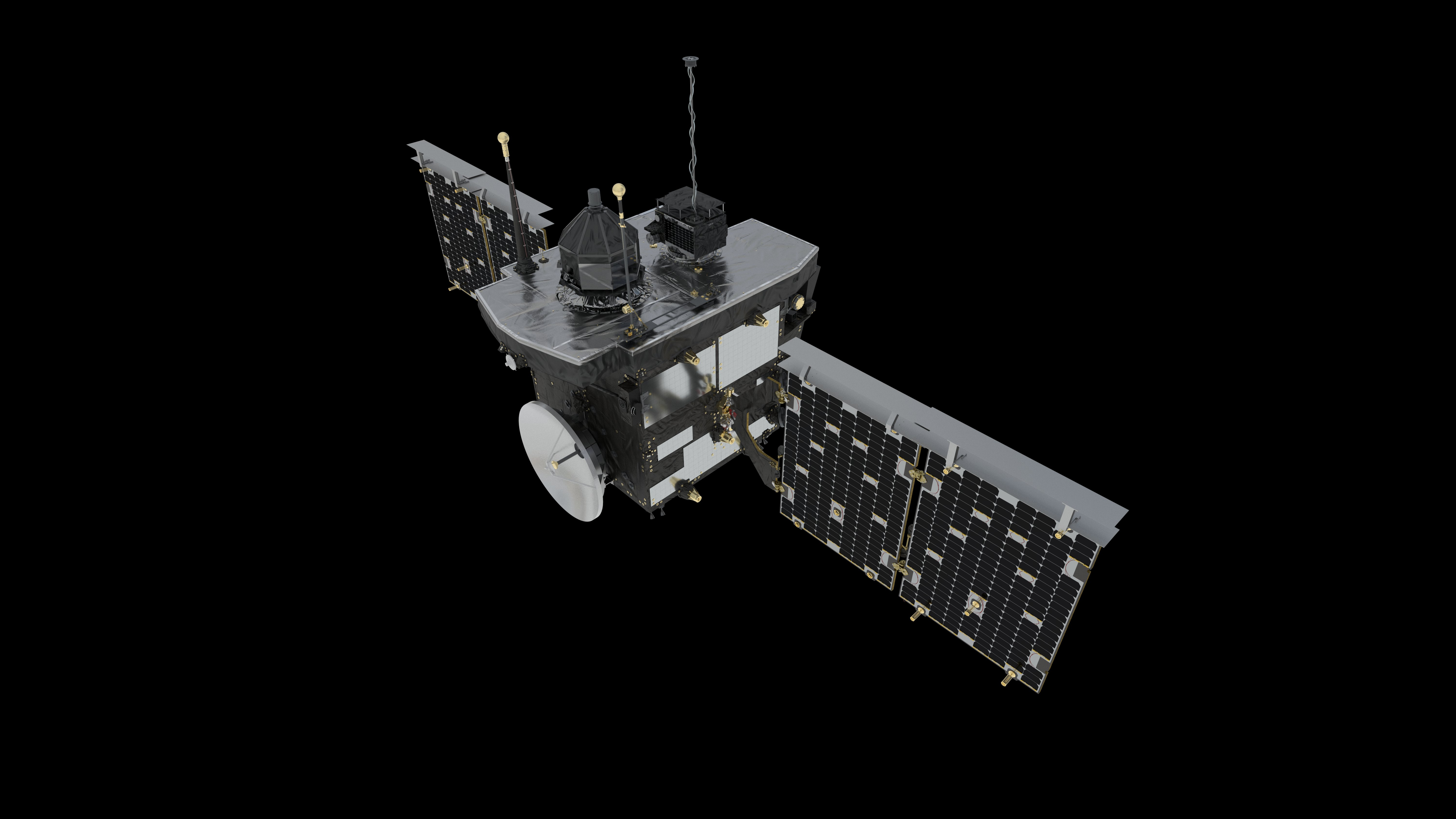
- The European Space Agency's Comet Interceptor is scheduled to be launched in 2029.

2029 in spaceflight

This article documents expected notable spaceflight events during the year 2029.

The China National Space Administration (CNSA) plans to launch Tianwen-4, a Jupiter orbiter and Uranus flyby mission, in 2029.

ESA plans to launch the Comet Interceptor mission in 2029.

ESA and ispace plan to launch MAGPIE, the first European lunar rover.

== Orbital launches ==
- ← Jan
- Feb
- Mar
- Apr
- May
- Jun
- Jul
- Aug
- Sep
- Oct
- Nov
- Dec →

| Date and time (UTC) | Rocket | Flight number | Launch site | | LSP | |
| Date and time (UTC) | Payload (⚀ = CubeSat) | Operator | Orbit | Function | Decay (UTC) | Outcome |
| Date and time (UTC) | Remarks | | | | | |
|---|---|---|---|---|---|---|
← Jan; Feb; Mar; Apr; May; Jun; Jul; Aug; Sep; Oct; Nov; Dec →; === January ===
| January (TBD) | (Russia) TBA | | (Kazakhstan) Baikonur or (Russia) Vostochny | | (Russia) Roscosmos | |
| January (TBD) | (Russia) Ekspress-AMU5-1 | RSCC | Geosynchronous | Communications | | |
| January (TBD) | (Russia) Ekspress-AMU6 | RSCC | Geosynchronous | Communications | | |
| January (TBD) | Ekspress-AMU5-1 will replace Ekspress AM5. Ekspress-AMU6 will replace Ekspress-AM6. | | | | | |
← Jan; Feb; Mar; Apr; May; Jun; Jul; Aug; Sep; Oct; Nov; Dec →; === July ===
| July (TBD) | (Russia) TBA | | (Kazakhstan) Baikonur or (Russia) Vostochny | | (Russia) Roscosmos | |
| July (TBD) | (Russia) Ekspress-AMU5-2 | RSCC | Geosynchronous | Communications | | |
← Jan; Feb; Mar; Apr; May; Jun; Jul; Aug; Sep; Oct; Nov; Dec →; === September ===
| September (TBD) | (China) Long March 5 | | (China) Wenchang LC-1 | | (China) CASC | |
| September (TBD) | (China) Tianwen-4 Jupiter orbiter | CNSA | Jovicentric | Jupiter orbiter | | |
| September (TBD) | (China) Tianwen-4 Callisto orbiter | CNSA | Jovicentric | Callisto orbiter | | |
| September (TBD) | (China) Tianwen-4 Uranus flyby spacecraft | CNSA | Heliocentric to escape velocity | Uranus flyby | | |
| September (TBD) | Dual-launch of a Chinese Jupiter orbiter and Uranus flyby spacecraft. | | | | | |
| Q3 (TBD) | (United States) Falcon 9 Block 5 | | (United States) Cape Canaveral SLC-40 | | (United States) SpaceX | |
| Q3 (TBD) | (South Korea) KPS-1 | Korea AeroSpace Administration | Geosynchronous | Navigation | | |
| Q3 (TBD) | (Italy) Vega-C | | (France) Kourou ELV | | (France) Arianespace | |
| Q3 (TBD) | CIMR A (Sentinel-11A) | ESA | Low Earth (SSO) | Oceanography | | |
| Q3 (TBD) | First of two satellites for the Copernicus Imaging Microwave Radiometer (CIMR) mission. Part of the European Space Agency's Copernicus Programme. | | | | | |
← Jan; Feb; Mar; Apr; May; Jun; Jul; Aug; Sep; Oct; Nov; Dec →; === December ===
| December (TBD) | (United States) Falcon 9 Block 5 | | (United States) Vandenberg SLC-4E | | (United States) SpaceX | |
| December (TBD) | (United States) (Germany) GRACE-C1 | NASA / DLR | Low Earth (Polar) | Gravimetry | | |
| December (TBD) | (United States) (Germany) GRACE-C2 | NASA / DLR | Low Earth (Polar) | Gravimetry | | |
| December (TBD) | Gravity Recovery And Climate Experiment-Continuity (GRACE-C). | | | | | |
← Jan; Feb; Mar; Apr; May; Jun; Jul; Aug; Sep; Oct; Nov; Dec →; === To Be Determined ===
| 2029 (TBD) | (Russia) Angara A5 | | (Russia) Vostochny Site 1A | | (Russia) Roscosmos | |
| 2029 (TBD) | (Russia) Luna 27A | Roscosmos | TLI to lunar surface | Lunar lander | | |
| 2029 (TBD) | Third Luna-Glob mission, landing near the lunar south pole. | | | | | |
| 2029 (TBD) | (Russia) Angara A5P | | (Russia) Vostochny Site 1A | | (Russia) Roscosmos | |
| 2029 (TBD) | (Russia) Orel | Roscosmos | Low Earth | Crewed flight test | | |
| 2029 (TBD) | (France) Ariane 62 | | (France) Kourou ELA-4 | | (France) Arianespace | |
| 2029 (TBD) | (Japan) Comet Interceptor | ESA / JAXA | Sun–Earth L_{2} | Comet flyby | | |
| JFY2029 (TBD) | (Japan) Epsilon S | | (Japan) Uchinoura | | (Japan) JAXA | |
| JFY2029 (TBD) | (Japan) Innovative Satellite Technology Demonstration-6 | JAXA | Low Earth | Technology demonstration | | |
| JFY2029 (TBD) | Part of JAXA's Innovative Satellite Technology Demonstration Program. | | | | | |
| JFY2029 (TBD) | (Japan) H3 | | (Japan) Tanegashima LA-Y2 | | (Japan) MHI | |
| JFY2029 (TBD) | (Japan) IGS-Radar Diversification 1 | CSICE | Low Earth (SSO) | Reconnaissance | | |
| JFY2029 (TBD) | First of a new generation of IGS-Radar satellites. | | | | | |
| JFY2029 (TBD) | (Japan) H3 | | (Japan) Tanegashima LA-Y2 | | (Japan) MHI | |
| JFY2029 (TBD) | (Japan) IGS-Optical 10 | CSICE | Low Earth (SSO) | Reconnaissance | | |
| 2029 (TBD) | (China) Long March 3B/E | | (China) Xichang | | (China) CASC | |
| 2029 (TBD) | (China) BeiDou-4 M1 | CNSA | Medium Earth | Navigation | | |
| 2029 (TBD) | (China) TBA | | (China) TBA | | (China) TBA | |
| 2029 (TBD) | (China) Solar Polar Orbit Observatory | CNSA | Heliocentric | High-inclination solar orbiter | | |
| 2029 (TBD) | (United States) New Glenn | | (United States) Cape Canaveral LC-36 | | (United States) Blue Origin | |
| 2029 (TBD) | (United States) Blue Moon MK2 | Blue Origin / NASA | Selenocentric (NRHO) | Crewed lunar lander | | |
| 2029 (TBD) | Sustaining HLS Crewed Lunar Demo for Artemis V. | | | | | |
| 2029 (TBD) | (Russia) Proton-M / Briz-M | | (Kazakhstan) Baikonur | | (Russia) Roscosmos | |
| 2029 (TBD) | (Russia) NEM | Roscosmos | Low Earth (ISS) | Space station module | | |
| 2029 (TBD) | NEM, also known as the Science Power Module, will be a core module of the Russian Orbital Station (ROS). | | | | | |
| 2029 (TBD) | (Russia) Soyuz-2.1a / Fregat | | (Russia) Vostochny Site 1S | | (Russia) Roscosmos | |
| 2029 (TBD) | (Russia) Kanopus-VO №1 | Roscosmos | Low Earth (SSO) | Earth observation | | |
| 2029 (TBD) | First satellite of the Kanopus-VO system, a next-generation successor to Kanopus-V. | | | | | |
| 2029 (TBD) | (Russia) Soyuz-2.1a / Fregat | | (Russia) Vostochny Site 1S | | (Russia) Roscosmos | |
| 2029 (TBD) | (Russia) Kanopus-VO №2 | Roscosmos | Low Earth (SSO) | Earth observation | | |
| 2029 (TBD) | (Russia) Soyuz-2.1a / Fregat-M | | (Russia) Vostochny Site 1S | | (Russia) Roscosmos | |
| 2029 (TBD) | (Russia) Kondor-FKA №3 | Ministry of Defence | Low Earth | Reconnaissance | | |
| 2029 (TBD) | (Russia) Soyuz-2.1b / Fregat-M | | (Russia) Plesetsk Site 43 | | (Russia) RVSN RF | |
| 2029 (TBD) | (Russia) Kosmos (GLONASS-K2 31L (K2 №10)) | VKS | Medium Earth | Navigation | | |
| 2029 (TBD) | (Russia) Soyuz-2.1b / Fregat-M | | (Russia) Plesetsk Site 43 | | (Russia) RVSN RF | |
| 2029 (TBD) | (Russia) Kosmos (GLONASS-K2 32L (K2 №11)) | VKS | Medium Earth | Navigation | | |
| 2029 (TBD) | (Russia) Soyuz-2.1b / Fregat-M | | (Russia) Plesetsk Site 43 | | (Russia) RVSN RF | |
| 2029 (TBD) | (Russia) Kosmos (GLONASS-K2 33L (K2 №12)) | VKS | Medium Earth | Navigation | | |
| 2029 (TBD) | (Argentina) Tronador II-250 | | (Argentina) Manuel Belgrano Space Center | | (Argentina) CONAE | |
| 2029 (TBD) | (Argentina) | CONAE | Low Earth | Flight test | | |
| 2029 (TBD) | Maiden flight of Tronador II-250. | | | | | |
| 2029 (TBD) | (Italy) Vega-C | | (France) Kourou ELV | | (France) Arianespace | |
| 2029 (TBD) | (Switzerland) ClearSpace-1 | ClearSpace SA (EPFL) | Low Earth | Space debris removal | | |
| 2029 (TBD) | ClearSpace-1 will capture and de-orbit the PROBA-1 satellite. | | | | | |
| 2029 (TBD) | (Italy) Vega-C | | (France) Kourou ELV | | (France) Arianespace | |
| 2029 (TBD) | CO2M-C (Sentinel-7C) | ESA | Low Earth (SSO) | Earth observation | | |
| 2029 (TBD) | Third satellite of the Copernicus Anthropogenic Carbon Dioxide Monitoring mission. Part of the European Space Agency's Copernicus Programme. | | | | | |
| 2029 (TBD) | (Italy) Vega-C | | (France) Kourou ELV | | (France) Arianespace | |
| 2029 (TBD) | Harmony A (Concordia) | ESA | Low Earth (SSO) | Earth observation | | |
| 2029 (TBD) | Harmony B (Discordia) | ESA | Low Earth (SSO) | Earth observation | | |
| 2029 (TBD) | Tenth Earth Explorers mission. | | | | | |
| 2029 (TBD) | (Italy) Vega-C | | (France) Kourou ELV | | (France) Arianespace | |
| 2029 (TBD) | LSTM (Sentinel-8) | ESA | Low Earth (SSO) | Earth observation | | |
| 2029 (TBD) | Part of the European Space Agency's Copernicus Programme. | | | | | |
| 2029 (TBD) | (Italy) Vega-C | | (France) Kourou ELV | | (France) Arianespace | |
| 2029 (TBD) | (France) (Germany) MERLIN | CNES / DLR | Low Earth (SSO) | Earth observation of atmospheric methane | | |
| 2029 (TBD) | (United States) TBA | | (United States) TBA | | (United States) TBA | |
| 2029 (TBD) | (United States) Blue Ghost M4 | NASA / Firefly | TLI to lunar surface | Lunar lander | | |
| 2029 (TBD) | (United States) Elytra Dark | Firefly | Selenocentric | Lunar orbiter | | |
| 2029 (TBD) | (United States) Moon Ranger | NASA/Carnegie Mellon University/Astrobotic | Selenocentric | Lunar rover | | |
| 2029 (TBD) | (Canada) TBA | Canadian Space Agency | Selenocentric | Lunar rover | | |
| 2029 (TBD) | Commercial Lunar Payload Services (CLPS) mission delivering payloads to the rim of Haworth Crater near the lunar south pole. | | | | | |
| 2029 (TBD) | (Russia) TBA | | (Kazakhstan) Baikonur or (Russia) Vostochny | | (Russia) Roscosmos | |
| 2029 (TBD) | (Russia) Ekspress-36 | RSCC | Geosynchronous | Communications | | |
| 2029 (TBD) | Replacement for Ekspress-AMU1 at 36° East. | | | | | |
| 2029 (TBD) | TBA | | TBA | | TBA | |
| 2029 (TBD) | Genesis | ESA | Low Earth | Satellite geodesy | | |
| 2029 (TBD) | Aims to greatly improve the International Terrestrial Reference Frame. | | | | | |
| 2029 (TBD) | (United States) TBA | | (United States) Cape Canaveral | | (United States) TBA | |
| 2029 (TBD) | (United States) HelioSwarm Hub | NASA | Highly elliptical | Heliophysics | | |
| 2029 (TBD) | (United States) HelioSwarm Node × 8 | NASA | Highly elliptical | Heliophysics | | |
| 2029 (TBD) | TBA | | TBA | | TBA | |
| 2029 (TBD) | (Japan) ULTRA | ESA / ispace | TLI to lunar surface | Lunar lander | | |
| 2029 (TBD) | MAGPIE | ESA | TLI to lunar surface | Lunar rover | | |
| 2029 (TBD) | (United States) Lunar Orbiting Satellite 3 | ispace-U.S. | Selenocentric (Polar) | Lunar communications | | |
| 2029 (TBD) | (United States) Lunar Orbiting Satellite 4 | ispace-U.S. | Selenocentric (Polar) | Lunar communications | | |
| 2029 (TBD) | ispace Mission 4. | | | | | |
← Jan; Feb; Mar; Apr; May; Jun; Jul; Aug; Sep; Oct; Nov; Dec →

- ← Jan
- Feb
- Mar
- Apr
- May
- Jun
- Jul
- Aug
- Sep
- Oct
- Nov
- Dec →

== Suborbital flights ==
| Date and time (UTC) | Rocket | Flight number | Launch site | | LSP | |
| Date and time (UTC) | Payload (⚀ = CubeSat) | Operator | Orbit | Function | Decay (UTC) | Outcome |
| Date and time (UTC) | Remarks | | | | | |

== Deep-space rendezvous ==
| Date (UTC) | Spacecraft | Event | Remarks |
|---|---|---|---|
| 18 January 2029 | JUICE | Third and final gravity assist at Earth | |
| 13 April 2029 | OSIRIS-APEX | Gravity assist at Earth | Target altitude 1153 km |
| 21 April 2029 | OSIRIS-APEX | Rendezvous with asteroid 99942 Apophis | Observation operations begin 8 April |
| August 2029 | Psyche | Arrival at asteroid 16 Psyche | |

== Extravehicular activities (EVAs) ==
| Start date/time | Duration | End time | Spacecraft | Crew | Remarks |

== Orbital launch statistics ==
=== By country ===
For the purposes of this section, the yearly tally of orbital launches by country assigns each flight to the country of origin of the rocket, not to the launch services provider or the spaceport. For example, Soyuz launches by Arianespace in Kourou are counted under Russia because Soyuz-2 is a Russian rocket.

| Country | Launches | Successes | Failures | Partial failures |
| World | 0 | 0 | 0 | 0 |
