= Fengyun 2-07 =

Chinese weather satellite

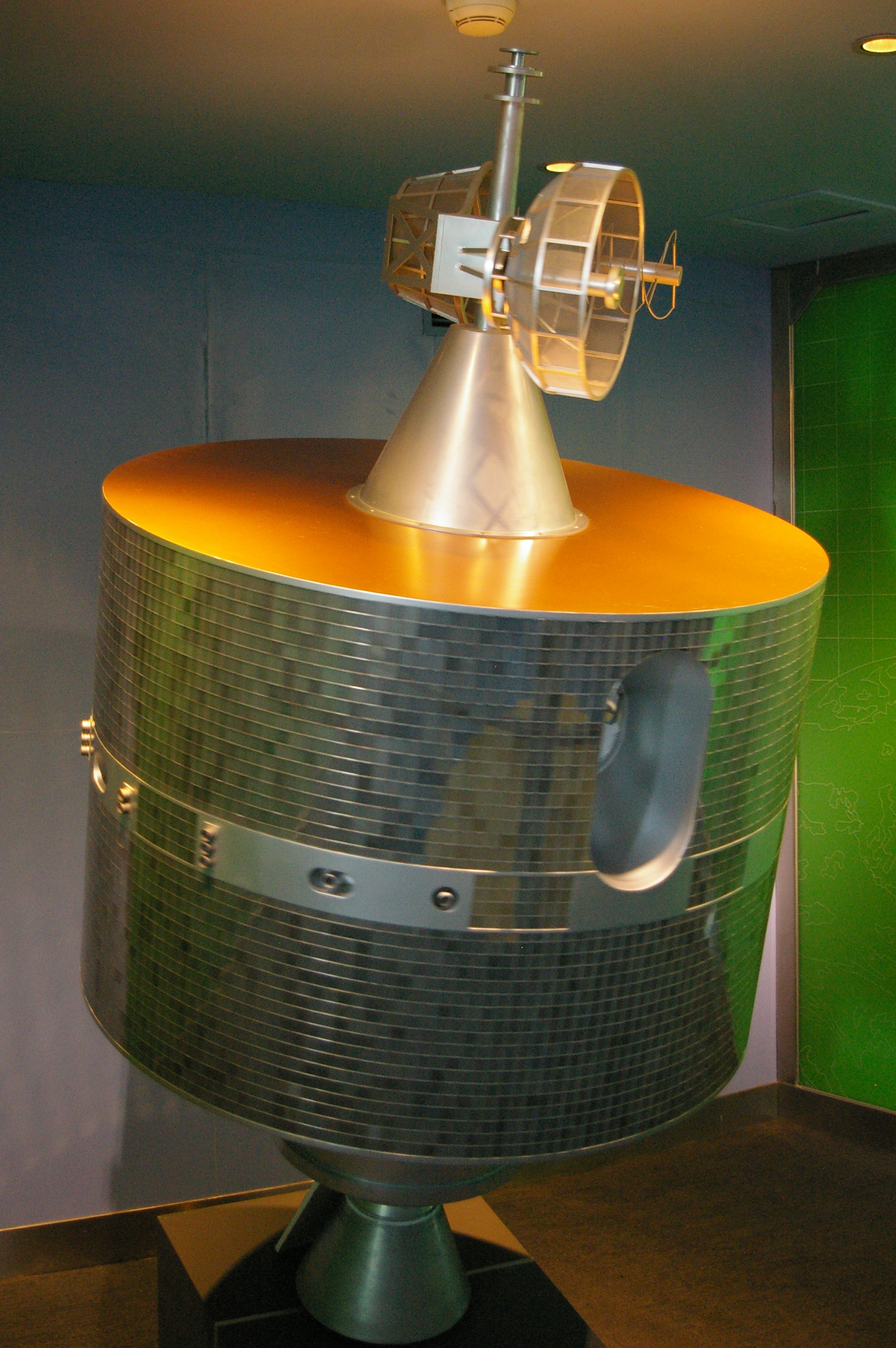
- Model of Fengyun-2 meteorological satellite in Shanghai Science & Technology Museum.
- Mission type: Weather
- Operator: National Satellite Meteorological Centre
- COSPAR ID: 2012-002A
- SATCAT no.: 38049

Spacecraft properties
- Launch mass: 1,369 kilograms (3,018 lb)

Start of mission
- Launch date: 13 January 2012, 00:56 UTC
- Rocket: Chang Zheng 3A Y22
- Launch site: Xichang LA-3

Orbital parameters
- Reference system: Geocentric
- Regime: Geostationary
- Longitude: 86.5° East
- Perigee altitude: 35,784 kilometres (22,235 mi)
- Apogee altitude: 35,796 kilometres (22,243 mi)
- Inclination: 1.00 degrees
- Period: 1,435.98 minutes
- Epoch: 31 October 2013, 22:00:50 UTC

Fengyun 2-07 or FY-2-07 (Chinese: 风云二号07 meaning Wind Cloud 2-07), also known as Fengyun-2F or FY-2F, is a Chinese weather satellite operated by China's National Satellite Meteorological Centre. Part of the Fengyun programme, it was the sixth Fengyun 2 geostationary satellite to be launched.

Fengyun 2-07 was launched by a Long March 3A carrier rocket, with the serial number Y22, flying from Launch Area 3 at the Xichang Satellite Launch Centre. The launch took place on 13 January 2012 at 00:56 UTC, and resulted in the successful deployment of the satellite into a geosynchronous transfer orbit. After raising itself into its operational geostationary orbit, by means of an FG-36 apogee motor, the satellite will be positioned at a longitude of 86.5 degrees East.

At launch, Fengyun 2-07 had a mass of 1,369 kilograms (3,018 lb), however by the time it reaches its operational orbit, this will have decreased to 536 kilograms (1,182 lb), partly through jettisoning the FG-36. The spacecraft is cylindrical, with a diameter of 2.1 metres (6 ft 11 in), and a length of 4.5 metres (15 ft) fully deployed. It is spin-stabilised at a rate of 100 rpm, and carries a five-channel Stretched Visible and Infrared Spin Scan Radiometer, or S-VISSR, capable of producing visible light and infrared images of the Earth. The S-VISSR will return visible-light images with a resolution of 1.25 kilometres (0.78 mi), and infrared images with a resolution of 5 kilometres (3.1 mi). It will produce a full-disc image every thirty minutes, as well as imaging smaller areas of interest. In addition to S-VISSR, Fengyun 2-07 also carries an x-ray detector to monitor the Sun, and detect solar flares.
