= Fengyun =

Chinese weather satellites

- 风云卫星; Fēngyún Wèixīng
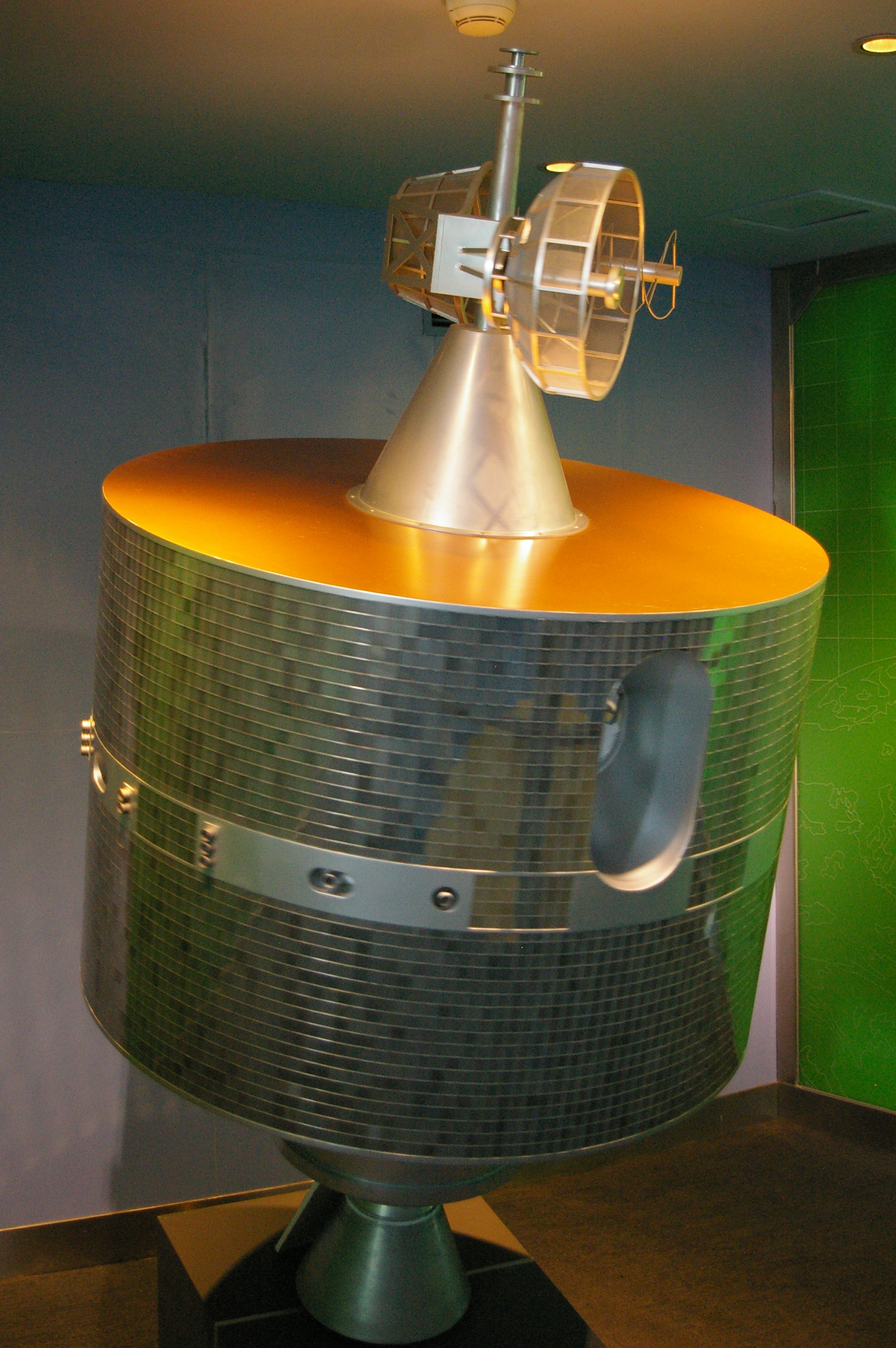
- Model of FY-2 in Shanghai Science and Technology Museum

Program overview
- Country: People's Republic of China
- Purpose: Meteorology
- Status: Active

Program history
- First flight: 6 September 1988

Vehicle information
- Launch vehicles: Long March 3; Long March 3A; Long March 3B; Long March 4B; Long March 4C

Fēngyún (FY, simplified Chinese: 风云; traditional Chinese: 風雲; lit. 'wind cloud') are China's meteorological satellites. Launched since 1988 into polar Sun-synchronous and geosynchronous orbit, each three-axis stabilized Fengyun satellite is built by the Shanghai Academy of Spaceflight Technology (SAST) and operated by the China Meteorological Administration (CMA). To date, China has launched twenty-one Fengyun satellites in four classes (FY-1 through FY-4). Fengyun 1 and Fengyun 3 satellites are in polar, Sun-synchronous orbit and Low Earth orbit while Fengyun 2 and 4 are geosynchronous orbit.

On 11 January 2007, China destroyed one of these satellites (FY-1C, COSPAR 1999-025A) in a test of an anti-satellite missile. According to NASA, the intentional destruction of FY-1C created more than 3,000 high-velocity debris items, a larger amount of dangerous space debris than any other space mission in history.

== Classes ==
=== Fengyun 1 ===
The four satellites of the Fengyun 1 (or FY-1) class were China's first meteorological satellites placed in polar, Sun-synchronous orbit. In this orbit, FY-1 satellites orbited the Earth at both a low altitude (approximate 900 km above the Earth's surface), and at a high inclination between 98.8° and 99.2° traversing the North Pole every 14 minutes, giving FY-1-class satellites global meteorological coverage with a rapid revisit time and closer proximity to the clouds they image. FY-1A, launched in September 1988, lasted 39 days until it suffered attitude control problems. FY-1B, launched in September 1990 along with the first two QQW (Qi Qiu Weixing) balloon satellites, lasted until late 1992 when its attitude control system also failed. FY-1C, launched in May 1999 along with Shijian-5, also completed its two-year design life operating until January 2004. The last satellite of the class, FY-1D, was launched in May 2002 and operated continuously for nine years until in May 2011 operations were temporarily lost. Despite resuscitation, FY-1D failed on 1 April 2012.

All Fengyun 1 satellites were launched from Taiyuan Satellite Launch Center (TSLC) in Shanxi Province on Long March 4A and 4B rockets and weighed 750 kg, 880 kg, 954 kg, and 954 kg respectively. Aboard each satellite were two multichannel visible and infrared scanning radiometers (MVISR) built by the Shanghai Institute of Technical Physics (SITP) bearing an optical scanner, image processor, radiant cooler, and controller for the radiant cooler. FY-1C and FY-1D satellites also carried on board a high-energy particle detector (HEPD) for study of the space environment, contributing to their increased mass. FY-1 satellites are powered by two deployable solar arrays and internal batteries.

==== Destruction of FY-1C ====
On 11 January 2007, China conducted its first anti-satellite (ASAT) missile test, destroying FY-1C with a kinetic kill vehicle, identified by the United States Defense Intelligence Agency (DIA) as the SC-19, a modified DF-21 ballistic missile with mounted kill vehicle. The shootdown, and the subsequent creation of a record-setting amount of in-orbit debris, drew serious international criticism.

=== Fengyun 2 ===
Satellites of the Fengyun 2 class are based on the spin-stabilized Dong Fang Hong 2 platform and are China's first class of meteorological satellites in geostationary orbit. Unlike meteorological satellites in polar orbit (like the FY-1 and FY-3 classes), FY-2 satellites in geostationary orbit remain in a fixed position relative to the Earth 35,000 km above its surface and maintain a constant watch over an assigned area. Unlike polar orbiting satellites which view the same area about twice a day, geostationary satellites can image a location as fast as once a minute and show long term meteorological trends - at the cost of resolution.

Built by the Shanghai Institute of Satellite Engineering and operated by the Chinese Meteorological Administration, FY-2 satellites are 4.5 m tall and are spin-stabilized rotating at 100 rotations per minute. FY-2-class satellites have been marketed for their openly available data whereby any user with a receiver could view FY-2 derived sensory data. Satellites of the Fengyun 2 class have a mass of 1,380 kilograms, use solar cells and batteries for power, and a FG-36 apogee motor jettisoned after attaining orbit.

On 2 April 1994, China attempted to launch the Fengyun 2 from Xichang Satellite Launch Center (XSLC) when, prior to its mating with the Long March 3, a fire caused an explosion destroying the satellite, killing a technician, and injuring 20 others. Officials of the Chinese space agency described the US$75 million loss of the satellite as a "major setback" to the Chinese space program. Despite this, China launched eight successive Fengyun 2 satellites without incident.

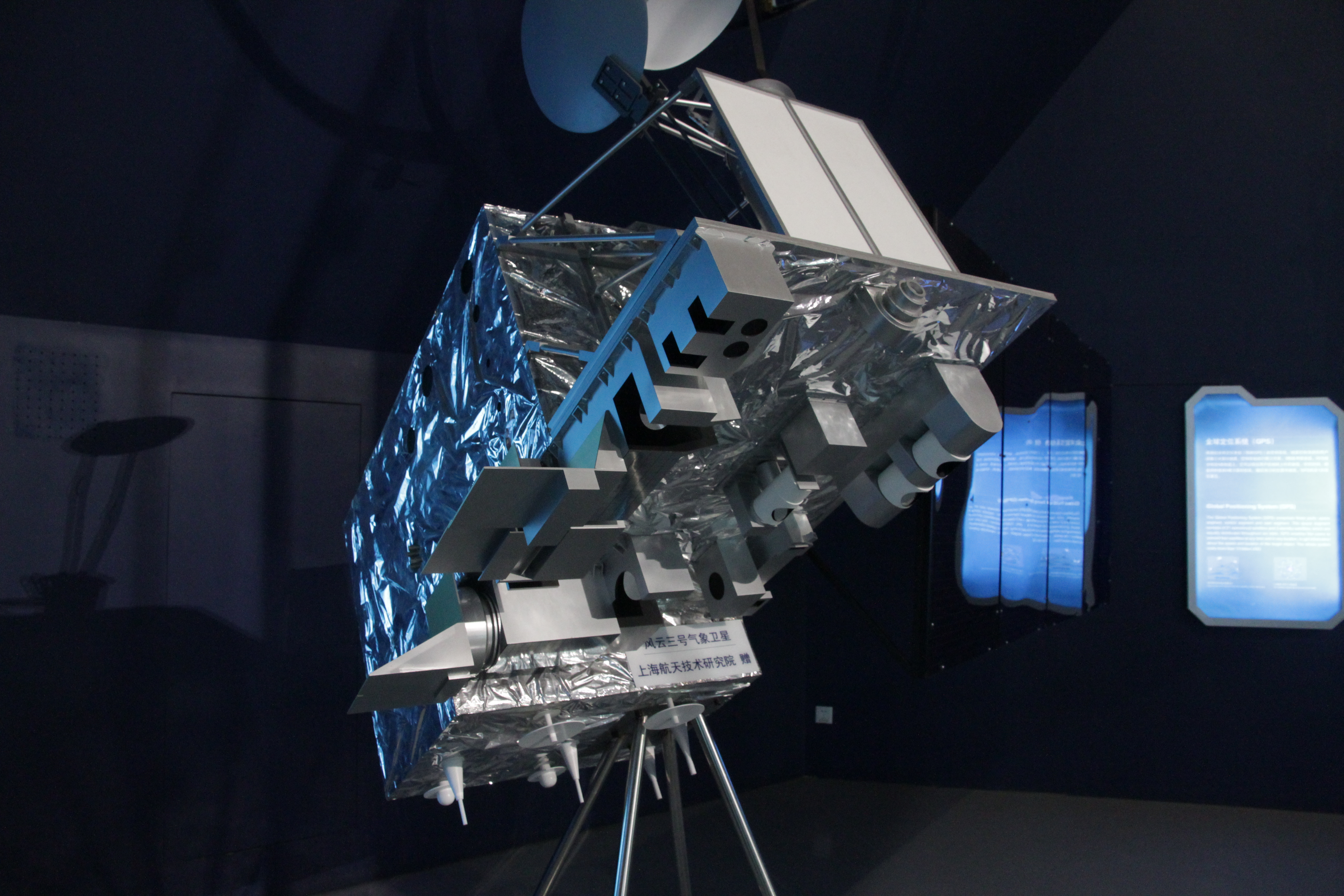
Model FY-3 in Shanghai museum

=== Fengyun 3 ===
Chinese participation in the monitoring of auroras for scientific and space weather investigation was initiated with the launch of the Fengyun-3D satellite, which carries a wide-field auroral imager.

=== Fengyun 4 ===
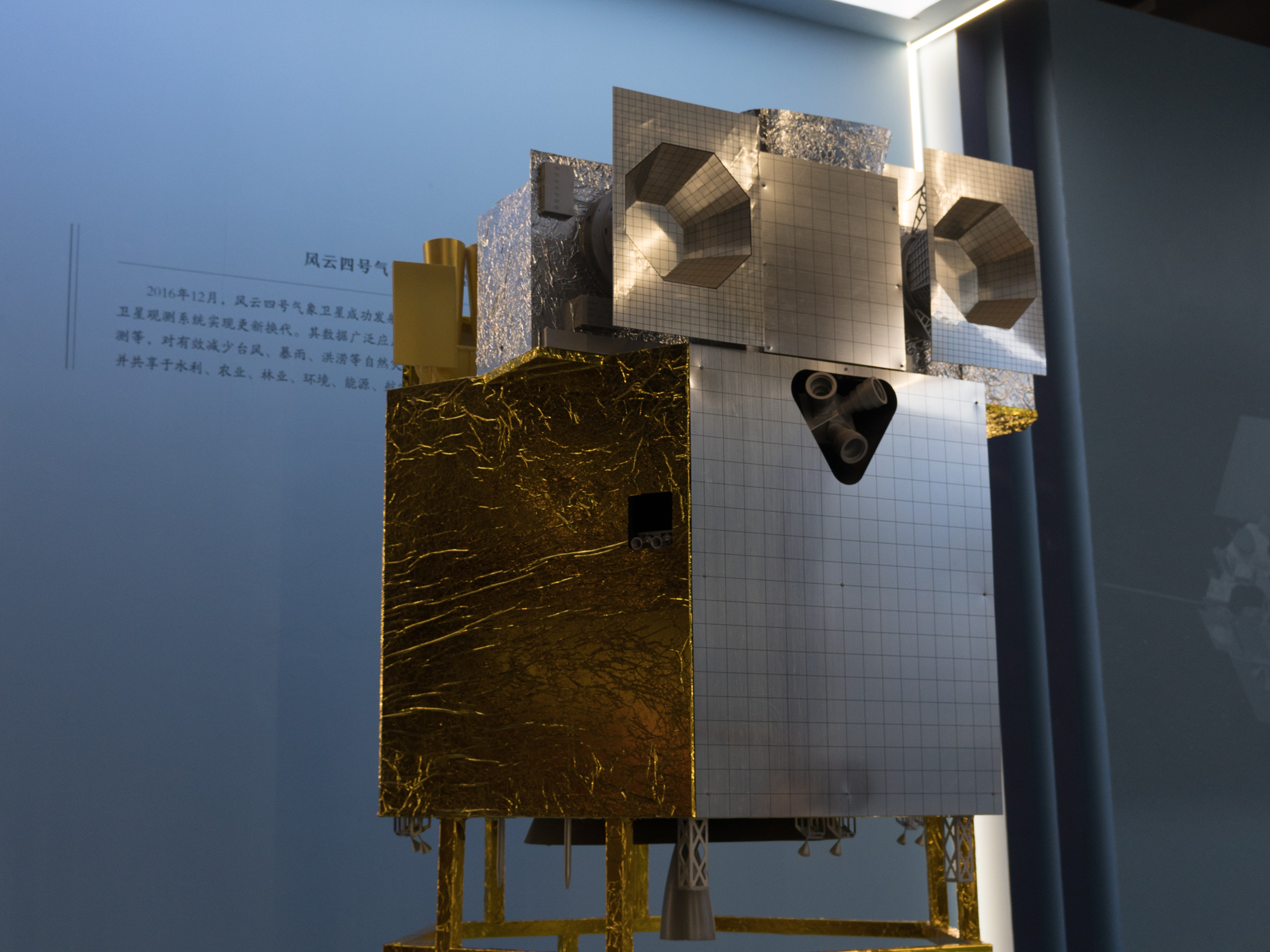
A mockup of a FY-4 satellite

As of 2021, China has launched two Fengyun 4 class satellites.

== List of satellites ==
Satellite	Launch	Orbit	Orbital apsis	Inclination	Period (min)	SCN	COSPAR	Launch site	Vehicle	Status
Fenyun 1A	6 September 1988	Sun-synchronous	880.0 km × 899.9 km	99.2°	102.6	19467	1988-080A	TSLC	Long March 4A	Decayed
Fengyun 1B	3 September 1990	Sun-synchronous	880.2 km × 902.5 km	98.8°	102.6	20788	1990-081A	TSLC	Long March 4A	Decayed
Fengyun 2-01	4 April 1994	Exploded before launch						XSLC	Long March 3	Destroyed before launch
Fengyun 2A	10 June 1997	Geostationary	36,588.1 km × 37,451.4 km	15.0°	1499.1	24834	1997-029A	XSLC	Long March 3	Decayed
Fengyun 1C	10 May 1999	Sun-synchronous	832.3 km × 851.7 km	99.0°	101.4	25730	1999-025A	TSLC	Long March 4B	Destroyed in 2007
Fengyun 2B	25 June 2000	Geostationary	35,830.7 km × 35,848.3 km	11.9°	1438.7	26382	2000-032A	XSLC	Long March 3	Decayed
Fengyun 1D	15 May 2002	Sun-synchronous	855.7 km × 878.8 km	99.1°	102.1	27431	2002-024B	TSLC	Long March 4B	Decayed
Fengyun 2C	19 October 2004	Geostationary	36,393.0 km × 36,443.3 km	10.2°	1468.1	28451	2004-042A	XSLC	Long March 3A	Decayed
Fengyun 2D	8 December 2006	Geostationary	36,330.7 km × 36,442.4 km	8.3°	1466.5	29640	2006-053A	XSLC	Long March 3A	Decayed
Fengyun 3A	27 May 2008	Sun-synchronous	830.0 km × 843.5 km	98.5°	101.4	32958	2008-026A	TSLC	Long March 4C	Decayed
Fengyun 2E	23 December 2008	Geostationary	35,785.9 km × 35,805.9 km	6.1°	1436.1	33463	2008-066A	XSLC	Long March 3A	Decayed
Fengyun 3B	4 November 2010	Sun-synchronous	835.3 km × 868.6 km	99.1°	101.8	37214	2010-059A	TSLC	Long March 4C	Decayed
Fengyun 2F	13 January 2012	Geostationary	35,794.2 km × 35,799.5 km	4.0°	1436.2	38049	2012-002A	XSLC	Long March 3A	Operational
Fengyun 3C	23 September 2013	Sun-synchronous	837.7 km × 854.8 km	98.5°	101.6	39260	2013-052A	TSLC	Long March 4C	Operational
Fengyun 2G	31 December 2014	Geostationary	35,782.4 km × 35,798.7 km	2.1°	1435.9	40367	2014-090A	XSLC	Long March 3A	Operational
Fengyun 4A	10 December 2016	Geostationary	35,784.0 km × 35,802.9 km	0.2°	1436.2	41882	2016-077A	XSLC	Long March 3B	Operational
Fengyun 3D	14 November 2017	Sun-synchronous	833.4 km × 836.9 km	98.8°	101.4	43010	2017-072A	TSLC	Long March 4C	Operational
Fengyun 2H	5 June 2018	Geostationary	35,776.6 km × 35,814.1 km	1.3°	1436.0	43491	2018-050A	XSLC	Long March 3A	Operational
Fengyun 4B	2 June 2021	Geostationary	35,786.6 km × 35,802.2 km	0.2°	1436.1	48808	2021-047A	XSLC	Long March 3B	Operational
Fengyun 3E	4 July 2021	Sun-synchronous	831.3 km × 835.4 km	98.7°	101.4	49008	2021-062A	JSLC	Long March 4C	Operational
Fengyun 3G	16 April 2023	Low Earth	410.0 km × 416.0km	50.0°	92.7	56232	2023-055A	JSLC	Long March 4B	Operational
Fengyun 3F	3 August 2023	Sun-synchronous	832.9 km × 834.1km	98.8°	101.4	57490	2023-111A	JSLC	Long March 4C	Operational
Sources: USSPACECOM, NASA, WMO, CelesTrak

== See also ==
- China Meteorological Administration
- 2007 Chinese anti-satellite missile test
- Yunhai-2
- Gaofen
