= Fengyun 2-05 =

Chinese weather satellite

- Mission type: Weather
- Operator: National Satellite Meteorological Centre
- COSPAR ID: 2006-053A
- SATCAT no.: 29640

Spacecraft properties
- Launch mass: 1,380 kilograms (3,040 lb)

Start of mission
- Launch date: 8 December 2006, 00:53 UTC
- Rocket: Chang Zheng 3A Y11
- Launch site: Xichang LA-2

Orbital parameters
- Reference system: Geocentric
- Regime: Geosynchronous
- Longitude: 86.5° East

Fengyun 2-05, also known as Fengyun 2D, was a Chinese meteorological satellite and the fourth spacecraft launched in the Fengyun-2 series. Launched on 8 December 2006 aboard a Long March 3A rocket from the Xichang Satellite Launch Centre, it was placed into geosynchronous transfer orbit. An FG-36 apogee motor subsequently raised it into geosynchronous orbit, where it was positioned at 86.5° east longitude.

== Description ==
Fengyun 2-05 is a spin-stabilised satellite that rotates at 100 revolutions per minute, with a design life of three years. Its five-channel Stretched Visible and Infrared Spin Scan Radiometer (S-VISSR) provides imagery at best resolutions of 1.25 km in the visible and 5 km in the infrared and water vapour channels, and produces a full-disc image every 30 minutes. It also carries a data collection service that relays messages from automatic platforms and a space environment monitor. Its launch gave China a two-satellite geostationary system alongside Fengyun 2-04, which improved how often cloud images were available. According to the WMO's OSCAR database, it was the primary satellite at 86.5° east, covering the Indian Ocean, until 30 June 2015, when Fengyun 2-06 took over that position, and it was then placed on standby and retired during 2015. A 2018 report by the China Meteorological Administration lists it as retired at 123.5° east. Its data are open to international users through S-VISSR broadcasts.

== Launch ==
A Long March 3A carrier rocket was used to launch Fengyun 2-05, flying from Launch Area 2 at the Xichang Satellite Launch Centre. The launch took place at 00:53 UTC (08:53 CST) on 8 December 2006, with the carrier rocket placing the satellite into a geosynchronous transfer orbit. An FG-36 apogee motor was then used to raise the satellite into geosynchronous orbit. By 7 February 2007, it was in an orbit with a perigee of 35,787 kilometres (22,237 mi), and apogee of 35,788 kilometres (22,238 mi), and 2.4 degrees inclination. It is positioned at a longitude of 86.5 degrees east.
