= List of BeiDou satellites =

BeiDou
- Country/ies of origin: People's Republic of China
- Type: Military, Commercial
- Status: Operational
- Coverage: Global

Constellation size
- Nominal satellites: 24 MEO, 3 GEO, 3 IGSO (BeiDou-3)
- Current usable satellites: BD-3: 28 MEO, 4 GEO, 3 IGSO; BD-2: 3 MEO, 5 GEO, 7 IGSO
- First launch: 30 October 2000
- Last launch: 19 September 2024
- Total launches: 64

Orbital characteristics
- Regime(s): Geostationary orbit Inclined geosynchronous orbit Medium Earth orbit
- Orbital height: Various

Docking with Shijian-21 done by Compass G2
- Docking date: Late December 2021
- Undocking date: Late January 2022

This is a list of past and present satellites of the BeiDou/Compass navigation satellite system. As of December 2023, 44 satellites are operational: 7 in geostationary orbits (GEO), 10 in 55° inclined geosynchronous orbits (IGSO) and 27 in Medium Earth orbits (MEO). Furthermore, 8 satellites (4 in Medium Earth orbit, 2 in geostationary orbit and 2 in inclined geosynchronous orbit) are undergoing testing or commissioning.

== Constellation design ==
For BeiDou-1, the system consists of 4 GEO satellites (3 active + 1 spare).

For BeiDou-2, the nominal constellation consists of 35 satellites (27 MEO, 5 GEO for BeiDou-1 compatibility, 3 IGSO).

For BeiDou-3, the nominal constellation consists of 30 satellites (24 MEO, 3 GEO, 3 IGSO). The constellation was declared "complete" on 23 June 2020.

== Satellites ==
=== Summary table ===
Summary of satellites, as of 19 September 2024
Constellation	Launch period	Launches			Status			
Constellation	Launch period	Success	Failure	Planned	Operational	Testing/Reserve	Unhealthy/Spare	Retired
1	2000–2006	4	0	0	0	0	0	4
2	2007–2019	20	0	0	15	0	0	5
3S	2015–2016	5	0	0	0	4	0	1
3	2016–present	35	0	0	35	0	0	0
Total		64	0	0	50	4	0	10

Note: 3S is the experimental / validation constellation for BeiDou-3. Although these satellites may be functional, their message format differs slightly from BD-3.

=== Full list ===
#	Satellite	Launch date (UTC)	Launch site	Carrier rocket	PRN	Orbit	Status	Remarks
-	BeiDou-1A	30 October 2000; 16:02	Xichang, LC-2	Long March 3A	N/A	GEO 140° E	Retired; December 2011	BeiDou-1, first generation experimental satellite
-	BeiDou-1B	20 December 2000; 16:20	Xichang, LC-2	Long March 3A	N/A	GEO 80° E	Retired; December 2011	BeiDou-1, first generation experimental satellite
-	BeiDou-1C	24 May 2003; 16:34	Xichang, LC-2	Long March 3A	N/A	GEO 110.5° E	Retired; December 2012	BeiDou-1, first generation experimental satellite
-	BeiDou-1D	2 February 2007; 16:28	Xichang, LC-2	Long March 3A	N/A	GEO 86° E	Retired; February 2009	BeiDou-1, first generation experimental satellite
1	Compass-M1	13 April 2007; 20:11	Xichang, LC-2	Long March 3A	N/A	MEO ~21,500 km	Retired	BeiDou-2, second generation validation satellite
2	Compass-G2	14 April 2009; 16:16	Xichang, LC-2	Long March 3C	N/A	GEO drifting	Retired	BeiDou-2 - Sent to GEO graveyard Orbit by Shijian-21 space Debris mitigation satellite or orbital servicing vehicle in January 2022.
3	Compass-G1	16 January 2010; 16:12	Xichang, LC-2	Long March 3C	N/A	GEO 140.0° E	Retired	BeiDou-2
4	Compass-G3	2 June 2010; 15:53	Xichang, LC-2	Long March 3C	N/A	GEO 79.5° E	Retired; September 29, 2018	BeiDou-2, retired on 29 September 2018
5	Compass-IGSO1	31 July 2010; 21:30	Xichang, LC-3	Long March 3A	C06	55° inclination IGSO 118° E	Retired	BeiDou-2
6	Compass-G4	31 October 2010; 16:26	Xichang, LC-2	Long March 3C	C04	GEO 160.0° E	Retired	BeiDou-2
7	Compass-IGSO2	17 December 2010; 20:20	Xichang, LC-3	Long March 3A	C07	55° inclination IGSO 118° E	Retired	BeiDou-2
8	Compass-IGSO3	9 April 2011; 20:47	Xichang, LC-3	Long March 3A	C08	55° inclination IGSO 118° E	Retired	BeiDou-2
9	Compass-IGSO4	26 July 2011; 21:44	Xichang, LC-3	Long March 3A	C09	55° inclination IGSO 95° E	Retired	BeiDou-2
10	Compass-IGSO5	1 December 2011; 21:07	Xichang, LC-3	Long March 3A	C10	55° inclination IGSO 95° E	Retired	BeiDou-2
11	Compass-G5	24 February 2012; 16:12	Xichang, LC-2	Long March 3C	C05	GEO 58.75° E	Retired	BeiDou-2
12	Compass-M3	29 April 2012; 20:50	Xichang, LC-2	Long March 3B	C11	MEO ~21,500 km, Slot A07	Retired	BeiDou-2
13	Compass-M4	29 April 2012; 20:50	Xichang, LC-2	Long March 3B	C12	MEO ~21,500 km, Slot A08	Retired	BeiDou-2
14	Compass-M5	18 September 2012; 19:10	Xichang, LC-2	Long March 3B	N/A	MEO ~21,500 km, Slot B03	Retired; October 21, 2014	BeiDou-2, transmission ended on 21 October 2014
15	Compass-M6	18 September 2012; 19:10	Xichang, LC-2	Long March 3B	C14	MEO ~21,500 km, Slot B04	Operational	BeiDou-2
16	Compass-G6	25 October 2012; 15:33	Xichang, LC-2	Long March 3C	C02	GEO 80° E	Retired	BeiDou-2, last satellite of the second generation
17	Beidou-3 I1-S	30 March 2015; 13:52	Xichang, LC-2	Long March 3C/YZ-1	C31	55° inclination IGSO 95° E	Experiment	BeiDou-3, third generation validation satellite
18	Beidou-3 M1-S	25 July 2015; 12:29	Xichang, LC-2	Long March 3B/YZ-1	C57	MEO ~21,500 km, Slot A01	Experiment	BeiDou-3, third generation validation satellite
19	Beidou-3 M2-S	25 July 2015; 12:29	Xichang, LC-2	Long March 3B/YZ-1	C58	MEO ~21,500 km, Slot A06	Experiment	BeiDou-3, third generation validation satellite
20	Beidou-3 I2-S	29 September 2015; 23:13	Xichang, LC-3	Long March 3B	C56	55° inclination IGSO 95° E	Experiment	BeiDou-3, third generation validation satellite
21	Beidou-3 M3-S	1 February 2016; 07:29	Xichang, LC-2	Long March 3C/YZ-1	N/A	MEO ~21,500 km	Retired	BeiDou-3, third generation validation satellite
22	Compass-IGSO6	29 March 2016; 20:11	Xichang, LC-2	Long March 3A	C13	55° inclination IGSO 95° E	Operational	BeiDou-2, for reliability redundancy improving, formerly PNR C15
23	Compass-G7	12 June 2016; 15:30	Xichang, LC-3	Long March 3C	C03	GEO 110.5° E	Retired	BeiDou-2, for reliability redundancy improvement
24	BeiDou-3 M1	5 November 2017; 11:45	Xichang, LC-2	Long March 3B/YZ-1	C19	MEO ~21,500 km, Slot B07	Operational	BeiDou-3, third generation navigation satellite. PRN C19 used until 12 June 2018.
25	BeiDou-3 M2	5 November 2017; 11:45	Xichang, LC-2	Long March 3B/YZ-1	C20	MEO ~21,500 km, Slot B08	Operational	BeiDou-3
26	BeiDou-3 M7	11 January 2018; 23:18	Xichang, LC-2	Long March 3B/YZ-1	C27	MEO ~21,500 km, Slot A04	Operational	BeiDou-3, PRN C28 used until 12 June 2018.
27	BeiDou-3 M8	11 January 2018; 23:18	Xichang, LC-2	Long March 3B/YZ-1	C28	MEO ~21,500 km, Slot A05	Operational	BeiDou-3
28	BeiDou-3 M3	12 February 2018; 05:03	Xichang, LC-2	Long March 3B/YZ-1	C21	MEO ~21,500 km, Slot B05	Operational	BeiDou-3
29	BeiDou-3 M4	12 February 2018; 05:03	Xichang, LC-2	Long March 3B/YZ-1	C22	MEO ~21,500 km, Slot B06	Operational	BeiDou-3
30	BeiDou-3 M9	29 March 2018; 17:56	Xichang, LC-2	Long March 3B/YZ-1	C29	MEO ~21,500 km, Slot A02	Operational	BeiDou-3
31	BeiDou-3 M10	29 March 2018; 17:56	Xichang, LC-2	Long March 3B/YZ-1	C30	MEO ~21,500 km, Slot A03	Operational	BeiDou-3
32	Compass-IGSO7	9 July 2018; 20:58	Xichang, LC-2	Long March 3A	C16	55° inclination IGSO 95° E	Operational	BeiDou-2, for reliability redundancy improving
33	BeiDou-3 M5	29 July 2018; 01:48	Xichang, LC-3	Long March 3B/YZ-1	C23	MEO ~21,500 km, Slot C07	Operational	BeiDou-3
34	BeiDou-3 M6	29 July 2018; 01:48	Xichang, LC-3	Long March 3B/YZ-1	C24	MEO ~21,500 km, Slot C01	Operational	BeiDou-3
35	BeiDou-3 M11	24 August 2018; 23:52	Xichang, LC-3	Long March 3B/YZ-1	C25	MEO ~21,500 km, Slot C08	Operational	BeiDou-3
36	BeiDou-3 M12	24 August 2018; 23:52	Xichang, LC-3	Long March 3B/YZ-1	C26	MEO ~21,500 km, Slot C02	Operational	BeiDou-3
37	BeiDou-3 M13	19 September 2018; 14:07	Xichang, LC-2	Long March 3B/YZ-1	C32	MEO ~21,500 km, Slot B01	Operational	BeiDou-3, with COSPAS-SARSAT MEOSAR payloads.
38	BeiDou-3 M14	19 September 2018; 14:07	Xichang, LC-2	Long March 3B/YZ-1	C33	MEO ~21,500 km, Slot B03	Operational	BeiDou-3, with COSPAS-SARSAT MEOSAR payloads.
39	BeiDou-3 M15	15 October 2018; 04:23	Xichang, LC-3	Long March 3B/YZ-1	C34	MEO ~21,500 km, Slot A07	Operational	BeiDou-3
40	BeiDou-3 M16	15 October 2018; 04:23	Xichang, LC-3	Long March 3B/YZ-1	C35	MEO ~21,500 km, Slot A01	Operational	BeiDou-3
41	BeiDou-3 G1	1 November 2018; 15:57	Xichang, LC-2	Long March 3B/E	C59	GEO 144.2° E	Operational	BeiDou-3
42	BeiDou-3 M17	18 November 2018; 18:07	Xichang, LC-3	Long March 3B/YZ-1	C36	MEO ~21,500 km, Slot C04	Operational	BeiDou-3
43	BeiDou-3 M18	18 November 2018; 18:07	Xichang, LC-3	Long March 3B/YZ-1	C37	MEO ~21,500 km, Slot C06	Operational	BeiDou-3
44	BeiDou-3 I1	20 April 2019; 14:41	Xichang, LC-3	Long March 3B/E	C38	55° inclination IGSO 120° E	Operational	BeiDou-3
45	Compass-G8	17 May 2019; 15:48	Xichang, LC-2	Long March 3C	C01	GEO	Operational	BeiDou-2, for reliability redundancy improving
46	BeiDou-3 I2	24 June 2019; 18:09	Xichang, LC-3	Long March 3B/E	C39	55° inclination IGSO 120° E	Operational	BeiDou-3
47	BeiDou-3 M23	22 September 2019; 21:10	Xichang, LC-2	Long March 3B/YZ-1	C45	MEO ~21,500 km, Slot C03	Operational	BeiDou-3, with COSPAS-SARSAT MEOSAR payloads.
48	BeiDou-3 M24	22 September 2019; 21:10	Xichang, LC-2	Long March 3B/YZ-1	C46	MEO ~21,500 km, Slot C05	Operational	BeiDou-3, with COSPAS-SARSAT MEOSAR payloads.
49	BeiDou-3 I3	4 November 2019; 17:43	Xichang, LC-2	Long March 3B/E	C40	55° inclination IGSO 120° E	Operational	BeiDou-3
50	BeiDou-3 M21	23 November 2019; 00:55	Xichang, LC-3	Long March 3B/YZ-1	C43	MEO ~21,500 km, Slot A06	Operational	BeiDou-3, with COSPAS-SARSAT MEOSAR payloads.
51	BeiDou-3 M22	23 November 2019; 00:55	Xichang, LC-3	Long March 3B/YZ-1	C44	MEO ~21,500 km, Slot A08	Operational	BeiDou-3, with COSPAS-SARSAT MEOSAR payloads.
52	BeiDou-3 M19	16 December 2019; 07:22	Xichang, LC-3	Long March 3B/YZ-1	C41	MEO ~21,500 km, Slot B02	Operational	BeiDou-3
53	BeiDou-3 M20	16 December 2019; 07:22	Xichang, LC-3	Long March 3B/YZ-1	C42	MEO ~21,500 km, Slot B04	Operational	BeiDou-3
54	BeiDou-3 G2	9 March 2020; 11:55	Xichang, LC-2	Long March 3B/E	C60	GEO	Operational	BeiDou-3
55	BeiDou-3 G3	23 June 2020; 01:43	Xichang, LC-2	Long March 3B/E	C61	GEO	Operational	BeiDou-3
56	BeiDou-3 G4	17 May 2023; 02:49	Xichang, LC-2	Long March 3B/E	C62	GEO	Operational	BeiDou-3
57	BeiDou-3 M26	26 December 2023; 03:26	Xichang, LC-2	Long March 3B/E/YZ-1	C48	MEO	Operational	BeiDou-3, for reliability redundancy improving
58	BeiDou-3 M28	26 December 2023; 03:26	Xichang, LC-2	Long March 3B/E/YZ-1	C50	MEO	Operational	BeiDou-3, for reliability redundancy improving
59	BeiDou-3 M25	19 September 2024; 01:14	Xichang, LC-2	Long March 3B/E/YZ-1	C47	MEO	Operational	BeiDou-3, for reliability redundancy improving; technology demonstrator for Beidou-4
60	BeiDou-3 M27	19 September 2024; 01:14	Xichang, LC-2	Long March 3B/E/YZ-1	C49	MEO	Operational	BeiDou-3, for reliability redundancy improving; technology demonstrator for Beidou-4

=== Medium Earth Orbit Satellites Orbital slots ===
Slot	Plane		
Slot	A	B	C
01	3-M16	3-M13	3-M6
02	3-M9	3-M19	3-M12
03	3-M10	3-M14	3-M23
04	3-M7	3-M20	3-M17
05	3-M8	3-M3	3-M24
06	3-M21	3-M4	3-M18
07	3-M15	3-M1	3-M5
08	3-M22	3-M2	3-M11
Number in italic are under commissioning. Numbers in parentheses refer to non-operational satellites.

Animation of BeiDou-3

Around the Earth

Around the Earth - Polar view

Earth fixed frame - Equatorial view, front

Earth fixed frame - Equatorial view, side

Earth · I1 · I2 · I3 · G1 · G2 · G3

== See also ==
- List of Galileo satellites
- List of GLONASS satellites
- List of GPS satellites
- List of NAVIC satellites
