= Yuanzheng =

Chinese upper rocket stage

- Manufacturer: CALT
- Country of origin: China
- Used on: Long March rocket family (2C · 2D · 3B · 3C · 5 · 7)

Associated stages
- Comparable: Fregat

Launch history
- Status: Active
- Total launches: 33
- Successes (stage only): 32
- Failed: 1
- First flight: 30 March 2015; BeiDou I1-S
- Last flight: 28 April 2025; Hulianwang × 10 (most recent)

Technical details
- Powered by: 1 × YF-50D
- Maximum thrust: 6.5 kN (1,500 lb_{f})
- Specific impulse: 315.5 seconds
- Propellant: N_{2}O_{4} / UDMH

Yuanzheng (Chinese: 远征; pinyin: Yuǎn Zhēng; lit. 'Expedition') is a restartable upper stage developed by the China Academy of Launch Vehicle Technology (CALT) for the Long March rocket family.

The Yuanzheng stage enables the Chinese launch vehicles to deploy payloads directly to high-energy orbits such as medium Earth orbit (MEO) and geosynchronous orbit (GSO). Since the Long March third stage cannot restart, it cannot circularize a GSO or GEO orbit from a geosyncronous transfer orbit (GTO). With its restart capability, Yuanzheng has enabled the deployment of satellite pairs for the BeiDou Navigation Satellite System in MEO and communications satellites in GSO. This eliminates the need for the spacecraft to include a liquid apogee engine or an apogee kick motor.

Yuanzheng has a thrust of 6.5 kN (1,500 lb_{f}) with a specific impulse of 315.5 seconds. It uses the storable hypergolic propellants unsymmetrical dimethylhydrazine (UDMH) and dinitrogen tetroxide (N_{2}O_{4}), and can perform at least two burns within its rated life of 6.5 hours, sufficient to reach the transfer orbit apogee, and perform the circularization burn from there.

Operational variants are designated YZ-1 for Long March 3B and 3C, YZ-1A for Long March 7, YZ-1S for Long March 2C, YZ-2 for Long March 5, and YZ-3 for Long March 2D.

== Versions ==
Currently, there is known to be five versions:

- Yuanzheng-1 (AKA YZ-1) (Chinese: 远征一号; pinyin: Yuǎn Zhēng Yī Hào; lit. 'Expedition One'): Initial version used with the Long March 3. It could perform missions of 6.5 hours, make two ignitions, perform one spacecraft deployment operation.
- Yuanzheng-1A (AKA YZ-1A) (Chinese: 远征一号甲; pinyin: Yuǎn Zhēng Yī Hào Jiǎ; lit. 'Expedition One A'): Improved version used with the Long March 7. Improved version with mission life extended to 48hs, capability to perform at least 9 ignitions and ability to do 7 different separation events. It also includes improved thermal control system, guidance algorithms and orbit planning for multiple payload deployment missions. It will be used as the base system for future deep space propulsion stages, space tugs and orbital servicing and debris removal spacecraft.
- Yuanzheng-1S (AKA YZ-1S) (Chinese: 远征一号商业型; pinyin: Yuǎn Zhēng Yī Hào Shāng Yè Xíng; lit. 'Expedition One Commercial Version'): Improved version used with the Long March 2C.
- Yuanzheng-2 (AKA YZ-2) (Chinese: 远征二号; pinyin: Yuǎn Zhēng Èr Hào; lit. 'Expedition Two'): New version used with the 5.2 m (17 ft) Long March 5 upper stage.
- Yuanzheng-3 (AKA YZ-3) (Chinese: 远征三号; pinyin: Yuǎn Zhēng Sān Hào; lit. 'Expedition Three'): New version used with the Long March 2D.

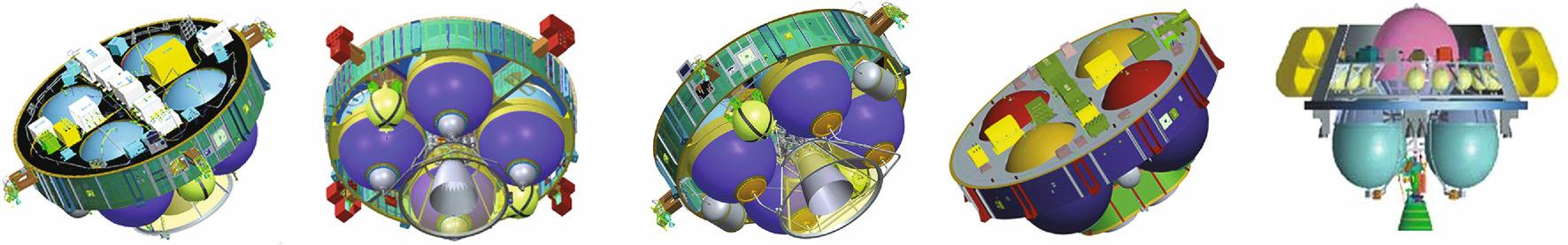
Yuanzheng upper stages from left to right: YZ-1, YZ-1A, YZ-1S, YZ-2, YZ-3

== History ==
Yuanzheng was presented in a 2013 paper and performed its first mission on 30 May 2015. The debut flight of the Long March 7 in 2016 included an improved version called Yuanzheng-1A that can flexibly deploy multiple payloads into various target orbits. Further variants were later deployed for Long March 5 (YZ-2) in 2016, Long March 2C (YZ-1S) and Long March 2D (YZ-3) in 2018.

Flight No.	Date (UTC)	Carrier Rocket	Stage Model	Serial number	Launch site	Mission	Result
1	2015-03-30; 13:52	Long March 3C	YZ-1	Y1	Xichang	BDS I1-S	Success
2	2015-07-25; 12:29	Long March 3B	YZ-1	Y2	Xichang	BDS M1-S / BDS M2-S	Success
3	2016-02-01; 07:29	Long March 3C	YZ-1	Y3	Xichang	BDS M3-S	Success
4	2016-06-25; 12:00	Long March 7	YZ-1A	Y1	Wenchang	Inaugural Mission	Success
5	2016-11-3; 12:43	Long March 5	YZ-2	Y1	Wenchang	Inaugural Mission	Success
6	2017-11-5; 11:45	Long March 3B	YZ-1	Y4	Xichang	BDS-3 M1; BDS-3 M2	Success
7	2018-01-11; 23:18	Long March 3B	YZ-1	Y5	Xichang	BDS-3 M7; BDS-3 M8	Success
8	2018-02-12; 05:03	Long March 3B	YZ-1	Y6	Xichang	BDS-3 M3; BDS-3 M4	Success
9	2018-03-29; 17:56	Long March 3B	YZ-1	Y7	Xichang	BDS-3 M9; BDS-3 M10	Success
10	2018-07-29; 01:48	Long March 3B	YZ-1	Y8	Xichang	BDS-3 M5; BDS-3 M6	Success
11	2018-08-24; 23:52	Long March 3B	YZ-1	Y9	Xichang	BDS-3 M11; BDS-3 M12	Success
12	2018-09-19; 14:07	Long March 3B	YZ-1	Y10	Xichang	BDS-3 M13; BDS-3 M14	Success
13	2018-10-09; 02:43	Long March 2C	YZ-1S	Y1	Jiuquan	Yaogan 32A, 32B	Success
14	2018-10-15; 04:23	Long March 3B	YZ-1	Y11	Xichang	BDS-3 M15; BDS-3 M16	Success
15	2018-11-18; 18:00	Long March 3B	YZ-1	Y12	Xichang	BDS-3 M17; BDS-3 M18	Success
16	2018-12-29; 08:00	Long March 2D	YZ-3	Y1	Jiuquan	Yunhai-2 01, 02, 03, 04, 05, 06; Hongyan-1	Success
17	2019-09-22; 21:10	Long March 3B/E	YZ-1	Y13	Xichang	BDS-3 M23; BDS-3 M24	Success
18	2019-11-23; 00:55	Long March 3B/E	YZ-1	Y14	Xichang	BeiDou-3 M21; BeiDou-3 M22	Success
19	2019-12-16; 07:22	Long March 3B/E	YZ-1	Y15	Xichang	BeiDou-3 M19; BeiDou-3 M20	Success
20	2021-08-24; 11:15	Long March 2C	YZ-1S	Y2	Jiuquan	RSW-01; RSW-02 unknown payload	Success
21	2021-11-03; 07:43	Long March 2C	YZ-1S	Y4	Jiuquan	Yaogan 32-02A, 32-02B	Success
22	2022-05-20; 10:30	Long March 2C	YZ-1S	Y5	Jiuquan	LEO Test Sat 1/2; Digui Tongxin Weixing	Success
23	2023-07-09; 11:00	Long March 2C	YZ-1S	Y3	Jiuquan	Hulianwang Jishu Shiyan 1A; Hulianwang Jishu Shiyan 1B	Success
24	2023-11-16; 03:55	Long March 2C	YZ-1S	Y9	Jiuquan	Haiyang-3A	Success
25	2023-11-23; 10:00	Long March 2D	YZ-3	Y2	Xichang	Hulianwang Jishu Shiyan 2A; Hulianwang Jishu Shiyan 2B; Hulianwang Jishu Shiyan 2C	Success
26	2023-12-26; 03:26	Long March 3B/E	YZ-1	Y16	Xichang	BeiDou-3 M25; BeiDou-3 M26	Success
27	2023-12-30; 00:13	Long March 2C	YZ-1S	Y17	Jiuquan	Hulianwang Jishu Shiyan 4A; Hulianwang Jishu Shiyan 4B; Hulianwang Jishu Shiyan 4C	Success
28	2024-03-13; 12:51	Long March 2C	YZ-1S	Y18	Xichang	DRO-A; DRO-B	Failure
29	2024-03-21; 05:27	Long March 2D	YZ-3	Y3	Jiuquan	Yunhai-2 Group 02	Success
30	2024-09-19; 01:14	Long March 3B/E	YZ-1	Y17	Xichang	BeiDou-3 M27; BeiDou-3 M28	Success
31	2024-12-12; 07:17	Long March 2D	YZ-3	Y5	Jiuquan	Gaosu Jiguang Zuanshi Xingzuo Shiyan Xitong (High-speed Laser Diamond Constellation Experimental System) × 5	Success
32	2024-12-16; 10:00	Long March 5B	YZ-2	Y2	Wenchang	Hulianwang × 10 (SatNet LEO Group 01)	Success
33	2025-04-28; 20:10	Long March 5B	YZ-2	Y3	Wenchang	Hulianwang × 10 (SatNet LEO Group 03)	Success
34	2025-08-13; 06:43	Long March 5B	YZ-2	Y4	Wenchang	Hulianwang × 10 (SatNet LEO Group 08)	Success
