= List of Mars orbiters =

List of spacecraft orbiting the planet Mars

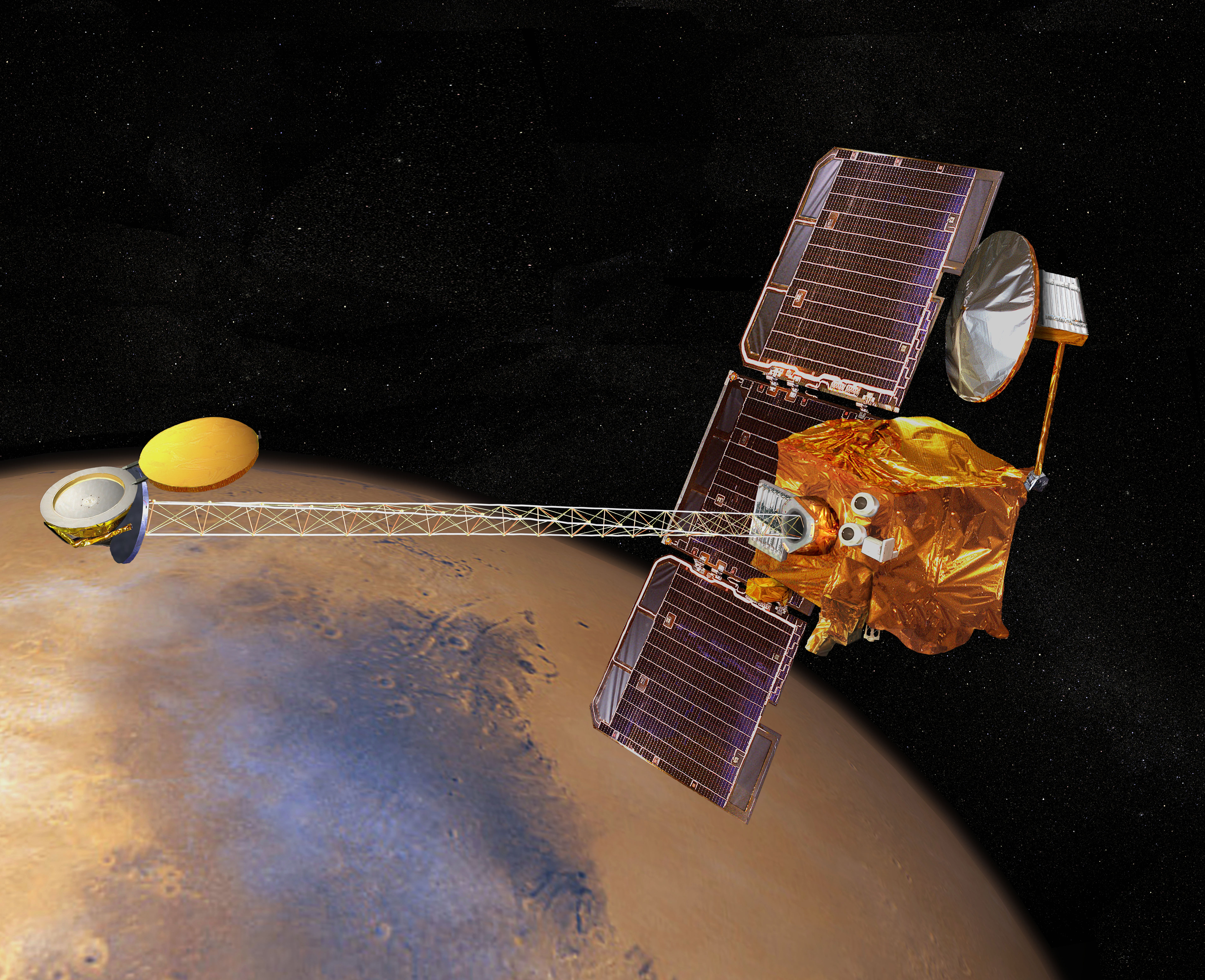
Artist's rendering of NASA's 2001 Mars Odyssey orbiting Mars

The following table is a list of Mars orbiters, consisting of space probes which were launched from Earth and are currently orbiting Mars. As of August 2023, there have been 18 spacecraft missions operating in Mars' orbit, 7 of which are currently active.

== History ==
=== 20th century ===
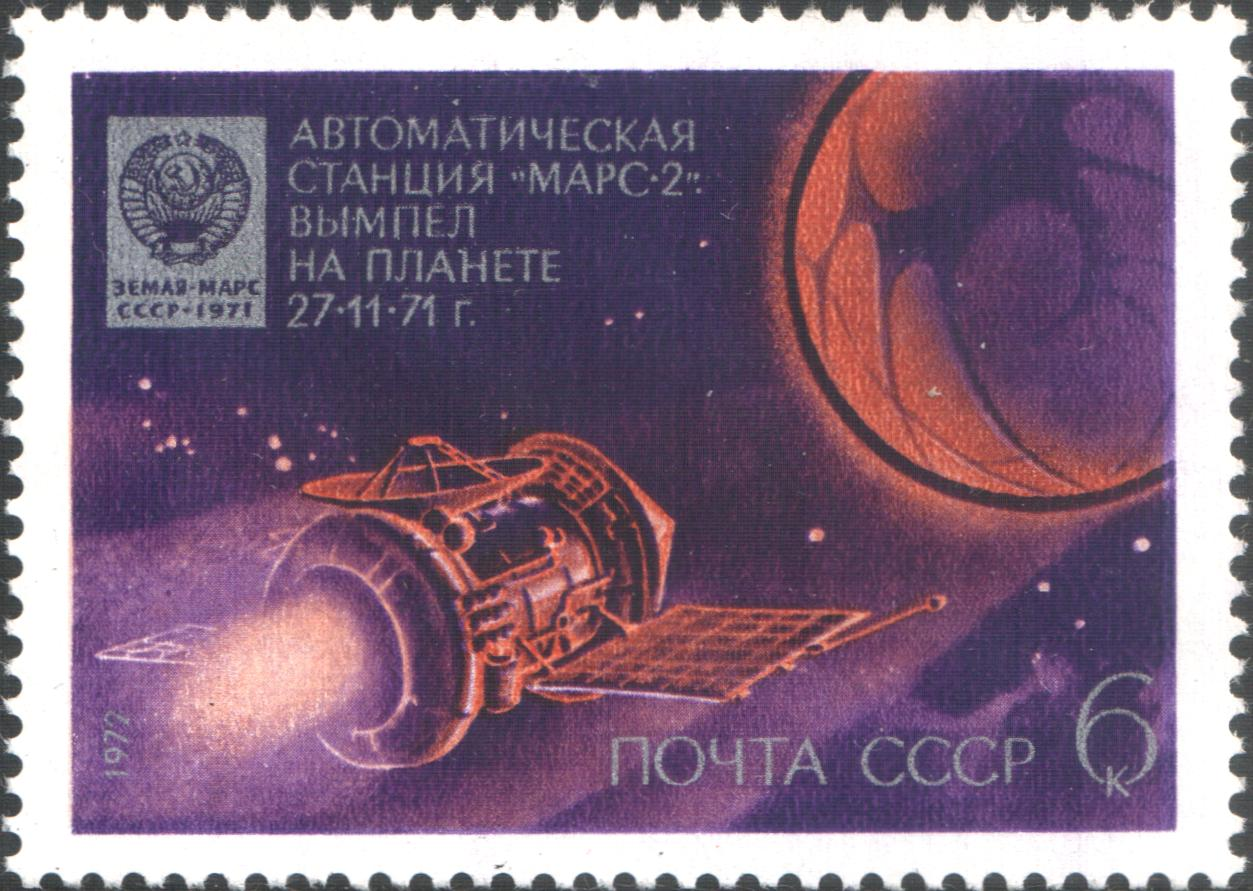
Soviet stamp depicting Mars 2

The Soviets' Mars program and the United States' Mariner program became the two first successful space programs that intended to explore Mars through orbiters. Mars 2, Mars 3 and Mariner 9 were all launched into space in May 1971, and all entered Mars’ orbit that same year. NASA's Mariner 9 reached the planet's orbit first on November 14, narrowly beating the Soviet's spacecraft amid the space race, and subsequently became the first spacecraft to orbit another planet.

Contact with all eight Mars orbiters launched during the 20th century has been lost. NASA's four spacecraft are conjectured to remain in Mars' orbit. Mariner 9, Viking 1 and Viking 2 are expected to lower down into the Martian atmosphere by 2022 and either burn up or crash into the planet's surface. Mars Global Surveyor is expected to crash onto the surface of the planet by 2047. The fate of the Soviet's three Mars program orbiters and Phobos 2 remains unclear, but they are still presumed to be in orbit.

In 1999 the Mars Climate Orbiter impacted the Martian atmosphere.

=== 21st century ===
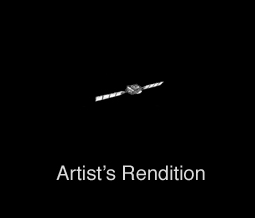
Artist's rendition of Mars Express as seen by NASA's Mars Global Surveyor

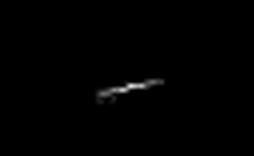
Image of Mars Express in orbit at Mars

2001 Mars Odyssey was launched April 7, 2001 on a Delta II rocket and currently holds the record for the longest-surviving continually active spacecraft in orbit around a planet other than Earth at 24 years, 7 months and 10 days.

In 2003, the European Space Agency (ESA) launched their first planetary mission with Mars Express to conduct reconnaissance and exploration of Mars from orbit. On 12 August 2005, NASA launched Mars Reconnaissance Orbiter (MRO). As MRO entered orbit in 2006, it joined three other active spacecraft which were in Mars' orbit: Mars Global Surveyor (MGS), Mars Express, and 2001 Mars Odyssey; at the time, this set a record for the most operational spacecraft in the immediate vicinity of Mars. MGS has since ceased to function.

On November 5, 2013, the Mars Orbiter Mission (Mangalyaan-1) was launched by the Indian Space Research Organisation (ISRO) as a "technology demonstrator" project. Its secondary goal is to analyze the Martian atmosphere and topography. The orbiter reached Mars orbit on September 24, 2014. Through this mission, ISRO became the first space agency to succeed in its first attempt at a Mars orbiter. The mission is the first successful Asian interplanetary mission. Ten days after ISRO's launch, NASA launched their seventh Mars orbiter MAVEN to study the Martian atmosphere. Its goals include determining how the planet's atmosphere and water, presumed to have once been substantial, were lost over time.

=== Fate ===
After achieving orbit, functional or not, Mars orbiters have been predicted to remain in orbit for a certain amount of time.

- Viking 1 orbiter, likely to be in orbit as of 2019.
- Mariner 9 was expected to remain in orbit until approximately 2022, when the spacecraft was projected to enter the Martian atmosphere and either burn up or crash into the planet's surface.
- Mars Global Surveyor is predicted to orbit until 2046 (50 years after insertion).

Besides decaying to Mars, a collision with a moon or other spacecraft is also a possibility. In March 2017, MAVEN had to change its orbit to avoid colliding with Phobos, and with an increasing number of spacecraft at Mars this risk increases. The Mars Global Surveyor is still being tracked, although it is no longer functioning.

== Table of objects ==
Color legend
Destroyed
Loss of contact
Operational

Note that days active category does not necessarily equate to time in orbit, for example Mars Global Surveyor is expected remain in Mars orbit for 50 years after its arrival. The detection of derelict spacecraft in Mars orbit has some interest due to the minute risk of collision with such a spacecraft. One example of this is a proposal to use the Optical Navigation Camera on the Mars Reconnaissance Orbiter to search for small moons, dust rings, and old orbiters.

| Artificial object | Agency | Launch date | Entered orbit | Days active | Image |
|---|---|---|---|---|---|
| Mars 2 | (Soviet Union) Lavochkin | 19 May 1971 | 27 November 1971 | 269 days | |
| Mars 3 | (Soviet Union) Lavochkin | 28 May 1971 | 2 December 1971 | 264 days | |
| Mariner 9 | (United States) NASA | 30 May 1971 | 14 November 1971 | 348 days | |
| Mars 5 | (Soviet Union) Lavochkin | 25 July 1973 | 12 February 1974 | 16 days | |
| Viking 1 | (United States) NASA | 20 August 1975 | 19 June 1976 | 1,520 days | |
| Viking 2 | (United States) NASA | 9 September 1975 | 7 August 1976 | 717 days | |
| Phobos 2 | (Soviet Union) Lavochkin | 12 July 1988 | 29 January 1989 | 57 days | |
| Mars Global Surveyor | (United States) NASA | 7 November 1996 | 12 September 1997 | 3,338 days | |
| 2001 Mars Odyssey | (United States) NASA | 7 April 2001 | 24 October 2001 | 8,988 days | |
| Mars Express | ESA | 2 June 2003 | 25 December 2003 | 8,196 days | |
| Mars Reconnaissance Orbiter | (United States) NASA | 12 August 2005 | 10 March 2006 | 7,390 days | |
| Mars Orbiter Mission (Mangalyaan) | (India) ISRO | 5 November 2013 | 24 September 2014 | 2,930 days | |
| MAVEN | (United States) NASA | 18 November 2013 | 22 September 2014 | 4,093 days | |
| ExoMars Trace Gas Orbiter | ESA (Russia) Roscosmos | 14 March 2016 | 19 October 2016 | 3,514 days | |
| Emirates Mars Mission (Hope) | (United Arab Emirates) UAESA | 19 July 2020 | 9 February 2021 | 1,940 days | |
| Tianwen 1 orbiter | (China) CNSA | 23 July 2020 | 10 February 2021 | 1,939 days | |
| Tianwen 1 Deployable Camera 2 | (China) CNSA | 23 July 2020 | 10 February 2021 (released on 31 December 2021) | <1 day | |

== See also ==
- Lists of spacecraft
- Exploration of Mars
- List of missions to Mars
- Robotic spacecraft
- Timeline of artificial satellites and space probes
- Timeline of planetary exploration
