= Portal Space Systems =

- Industry: Space technology
- Founded: 2021
- Headquarters: Bothell, Washington
- Key people: Jeff Thornburg (CEO and Co-Founder) Ian Vorbach (COO and Co-Founder) Prashaanth Ravindran (VP Engineering and Co-Founder)
- Products: Next generation satellites
- Website: portalsystems.space

Portal Space Systems is an American private aerospace company headquartered in Bothell, Washington. Founded in 2021, the company develops maneuverable spacecraft designed for "orbital mobility"—the ability to rapidly change orbits for defense, civil, and commercial missions. The company is known for commercializing solar thermal propulsion (STP) technology and for its Supernova and Starburst spacecraft platforms.

== History ==
Portal Space Systems was founded in 2021 by Jeff Thornburg, a former propulsion executive at SpaceX and Amazon Project Kuiper, alongside Ian Vorbach and Prashaanth Ravindran. The company remained in stealth mode until early 2024, when it announced its focus on solving the limitations of static orbital architectures.

In April 2024, the company emerged from stealth with an initial $3 million in funding from the U.S. Department of Defense. In 2025, Portal announced a $17.5 million seed funding round led by AlleyCorp, with participation from Mach33, FUSE, and other strategic investors. By December 2025, the company had secured a $45 million Strategic Funding Increase (STRATFI) from the U.S. Space Force and a $350,000 grant from the State of Washington to expand its manufacturing facilities in Bothell. In April of 2026, the company announced that they had raised an additional $50 million in Series A funding at a $250 million dollar valuation.

== Technology ==
The company’s core technology centers on solar thermal propulsion (STP). Unlike traditional chemical rockets or high-efficiency but low-thrust electric propulsion, STP uses concentrated sunlight to heat a propellant, in this case ammonia, to generate thrust.

- Propulsion System: Large deployable mirrors focus solar energy onto a 3D-printed heat exchanger, which heats the propellant to high temperatures before it is expelled through a nozzle.
- Performance: The system is designed to provide high delta-v (velocity change). By optimizing for both high delta-v and high thrust, the company claims its Supernova platform can achieve 6 km/s of delta-v
- Manufacturing: Portal utilizes additive manufacturing (3D printing) for complex propulsion components and heat exchangers to reduce mass and production timelines.

== Spacecraft platforms ==
=== Supernova ===
Supernova is a trans-orbital spacecraft designed for high-range mobility. It is engineered to transition between Low Earth Orbit (LEO), Medium Earth Orbit (MEO), and Geostationary Orbit (GEO). The platform is intended to support missions requiring rapid repositioning, such as space domain awareness and satellite servicing.

=== Starburst ===
Introduced in late 2025, Starburst is an ESPA-class spacecraft bus designed for rapid retasking within specific orbital planes. It shares core subsystems with the Supernova platform, including the reaction control system (RCS). Starburst is marketed toward "proliferated space architectures," in which fleets of smaller, maneuverable satellites are used to enhance resilience.

== Missions ==
=== Mini-Nova 1 ===
The company's inaugural orbital demonstration, Mini-Nova 1, is scheduled to launch in Q1 2026. This mission will fly aboard a Momentus Vigoride orbital transfer vehicle to validate the company's solar thermal propulsion technology in a space environment.

=== Starbust-1 ===
The company's first free-flying mission, Starburst-1, is scheduled to launch in late 2026 on a SpaceX Falcon 9 (Transporter-18 mission). The mission aims to demonstrate:

- Rendezvous and proximity operations (RPO).
- Rapid orbital changes.
- Validation of shared subsystems for the larger Supernova platform. The mission will host payloads from partners, including TRL11 (real-time video processing) and Zenno Astronautics (superconducting magnetic actuators).

== Operations ==
Portal Space Systems operates an 8,000-square-foot development site and is currently expanding into a 50,000-square-foot manufacturing facility in Bothell, Washington. As of 2026, the company aims to scale production to build multiple spacecraft per month to meet government and commercial demand.

== Recognition ==
Via Satellite "Top 10 Startups to Watch" (2025)
