= Long March 3A =

Chinese orbital carrier rocket

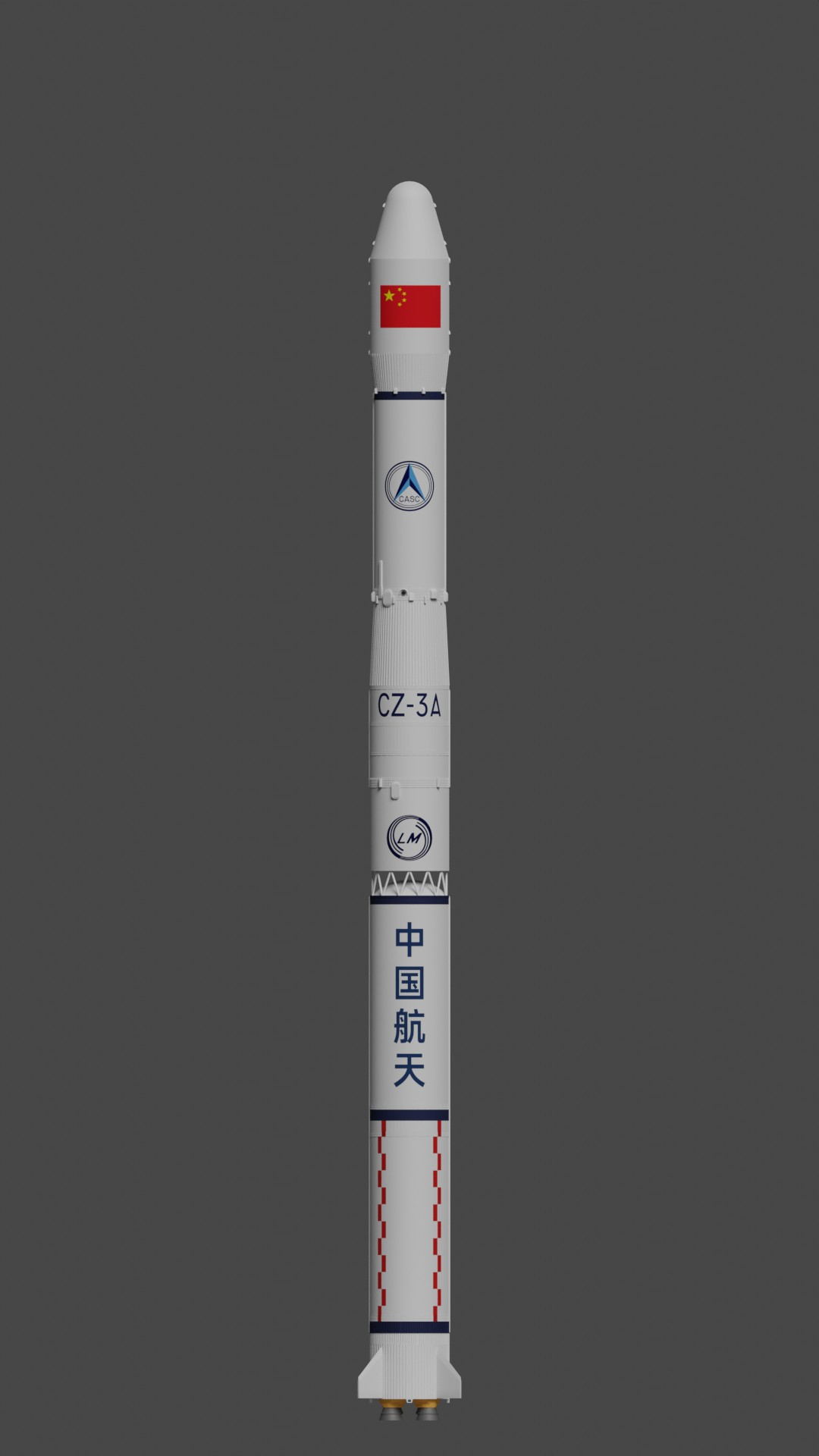
- Rendering of Long March 3A
- Function: Medium-lift launch vehicle
- Manufacturer: China Academy of Launch Vehicle Technology
- Country of origin: China
- Cost per launch: US$70 million

Size
- Height: 52.52 metres (172.3 ft)
- Diameter: 3.35 metres (11.0 ft)
- Mass: 241,000 kilograms (531,000 lb)
- Stages: 3

Capacity

Payload to LEO
- Mass: 8,500 kilograms (18,700 lb)

Payload to GTO
- Mass: 2,600 kilograms (5,700 lb)

Payload to HCO
- Mass: 1,600 kilograms (3,500 lb)

Associated rockets
- Family: Long March
- Derivative work: Long March 3B; Long March 3C

Launch history
- Status: Retired
- Launch sites: LA-2 & LA-3, XSLC
- Total launches: 27
- Success(es): 27
- First flight: 8 February 1994
- Last flight: 9 July 2018

First stage
- Height: 23.272 m
- Diameter: 3.35 m
- Propellant mass: 171,800 kg (378,800 lb)
- Powered by: 4 YF-21C
- Maximum thrust: 2,961.6 kN (665,800 lb_{f})
- Specific impulse: 2,556.5 m/s (260.69 s)
- Burn time: 148 s
- Propellant: N_{2}O_{4} / UDMH

Second stage
- Height: 11.276 m
- Diameter: 3.35 m
- Propellant mass: 32,600 kg (71,900 lb)
- Powered by: 1 YF-24E (1 x YF-22E (Main)) (4 x YF-23C (Vernier))
- Maximum thrust: 742 kN (167,000 lb_{f}) (Main); 47.1 kN (10,600 lb_{f}) (Vernier)
- Specific impulse: 2,922.57 m/s (298.019 s) (Main); 2,910.5 m/s (296.79 s) (Vernier)
- Burn time: 115 s
- Propellant: N_{2}O_{4} / UDMH

Third stage
- Height: 12.375 m
- Diameter: 3.0 m
- Propellant mass: 18,200 kg (40,100 lb)
- Powered by: 2 YF-75
- Maximum thrust: 167.17 kN (37,580 lb_{f})
- Specific impulse: 4,295 m/s (438.0 s)
- Burn time: 475 s
- Propellant: LH_{2} / LOX

The Long March 3A (Chinese: 长征三号甲火箭), also known as the Chang Zheng 3A, CZ-3A and LM-3A, is a Chinese orbital carrier rocket, part of the Long March family of expendable rockets. A three-stage rocket, it was usually used to place communications satellites and Beidou navigation satellites into geosynchronous transfer orbit. It was manufactured by the Great Wall Industry Corporation.

== History and specifications ==
The Long March 3A is the first variant of the Long March 3. The first stage was lengthened from 20.219 metres (66.34 ft) to 23.075 metres (75.71 ft), and the third stage was enlarged and redesigned to accommodate two YF-75 rocket engines, whereas its predecessor had a single YF-73; this gave it the capability to lift 2.3 tonnes (2.5 tons) into geosynchronous orbit, compared to the Long March 3's 1.4 tonnes (1.5 tons). A new computer system was also installed.

The first and second stages used hypergolic propellants (unsymmetrical dimethylhydrazine and nitrogen tetroxide), while the third used cryogenic fuel (liquid hydrogen and liquid oxygen).

Its achievements include powering the first two BeiDou navigation satellites into orbit (Beidou 1A on 30 October 2000 and Beidou 1B on 20 December), as well as China's first Moon probe, Chang'e 1, into lunar orbit in 2007.

It formed the basis of the Long March 3B, which by adding four strap-on booster rockets increased the lifting capacity to 4.8 tonnes (5.3 tons).

== Launch statistics ==
- Failure
- Partial failure
- Success
- Planned

== Launches ==
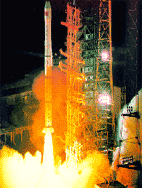
Long March 3A launch

Long March 3A rockets were launched from Launch Areas 2 and 3 at the Xichang Satellite Launch Center (XSLC).

Flight number	Serial number	Date (UTC)	Launch site	Payload	Orbit	Result
1	Y1	8 February 1994; 08:34	LA-2, XSLC	Shijian 4	HEO	Success
2	Y2	29 November 1994; 17:02	LA-2, XSLC	Dong Fang Hong 3	GTO	Success
3	Y3	11 May 1997; 16:17	LA-2, XSLC	ChinaSat 6	GTO	Success
4	Y4	25 January 2000; 16:45	LA-2, XSLC	ChinaSat 22	GTO	Success
5	Y5	30 October 2000; 16:02	LA-2, XSLC	Beidou-1A	GTO	Success
6	Y6	20 December 2000; 16:20	LA-2, XSLC	Beidou-1B	GTO	Success
7	Y7	24 May 2003; 16:34	LA-2, XSLC	Beidou-1C	GTO	Success
8	Y8	14 November 2003; 16:01	LA-2, XSLC	ChinaSat 20	GTO	Success
9	Y9	19 October 2004; 01:20	LA-2, XSLC	Fengyun 2C	GTO	Success
10	Y10	12 September 2006; 16:02	LA-2, XSLC	ChinaSat 22A	GTO	Success
11	Y11	8 December 2006; 00:53	LA-2, XSLC	Fengyun 2D	GTO	Success
12	Y12	2 February 2007; 16:28	LA-2, XSLC	Beidou-1D	GTO	Success
13	Y13	13 April 2007; 20:11	LA-3, XSLC	Compass-M1	MEO	Success
14	Y15	31 May 2007; 16:08	LA-3, XSLC	SinoSat 3	GTO	Success
15	Y14	24 October 2007; 10:05	LA-3, XSLC	Chang'e 1	LTO	Success
16	Y20	23 December 2008; 00:54	LA-3, XSLC	Fengyun 2E	GTO	Success
17	Y16	31 July 2010; 21:30	LA-3, XSLC	Compass-IGSO1	GTO	Success
18	Y21	24 November 2010; 16:09	LA-3, XSLC	ChinaSat 20A	GTO	Success
19	Y18	17 December 2010; 20:20	LA-3, XSLC	Compass-IGSO2	GTO	Success
20	Y19	9 April 2011; 20:47	LA-3, XSLC	Compass-IGSO3	GTO	Success
21	Y17	26 July 2011; 21:44	LA-3, XSLC	Compass-IGSO4	GTO	Success
22	Y23	1 December 2011; 21:07	LA-3, XSLC	Compass-IGSO5	GTO	Success
23	Y22	13 January 2012; 00:56	LA-3, XSLC	Fengyun 2F	GTO	Success
24	Y24	31 December 2014; 01:02	LA-2, XSLC	Fengyun 2G	GTO	Success
25	Y26	29 March 2016; 20:11	LA-2, XSLC	Compass-IGSO6	GTO	Success
26	Y25	5 June 2018; 13:07	LA-2, XSLC	Fengyun 2H	GTO	Success
27	Y27	9 July 2018; 20:58	LA-2, XSLC	Compass-IGSO7	GTO	Success

== See also ==
- List of Long March launches
