= 2020 in spaceflight =

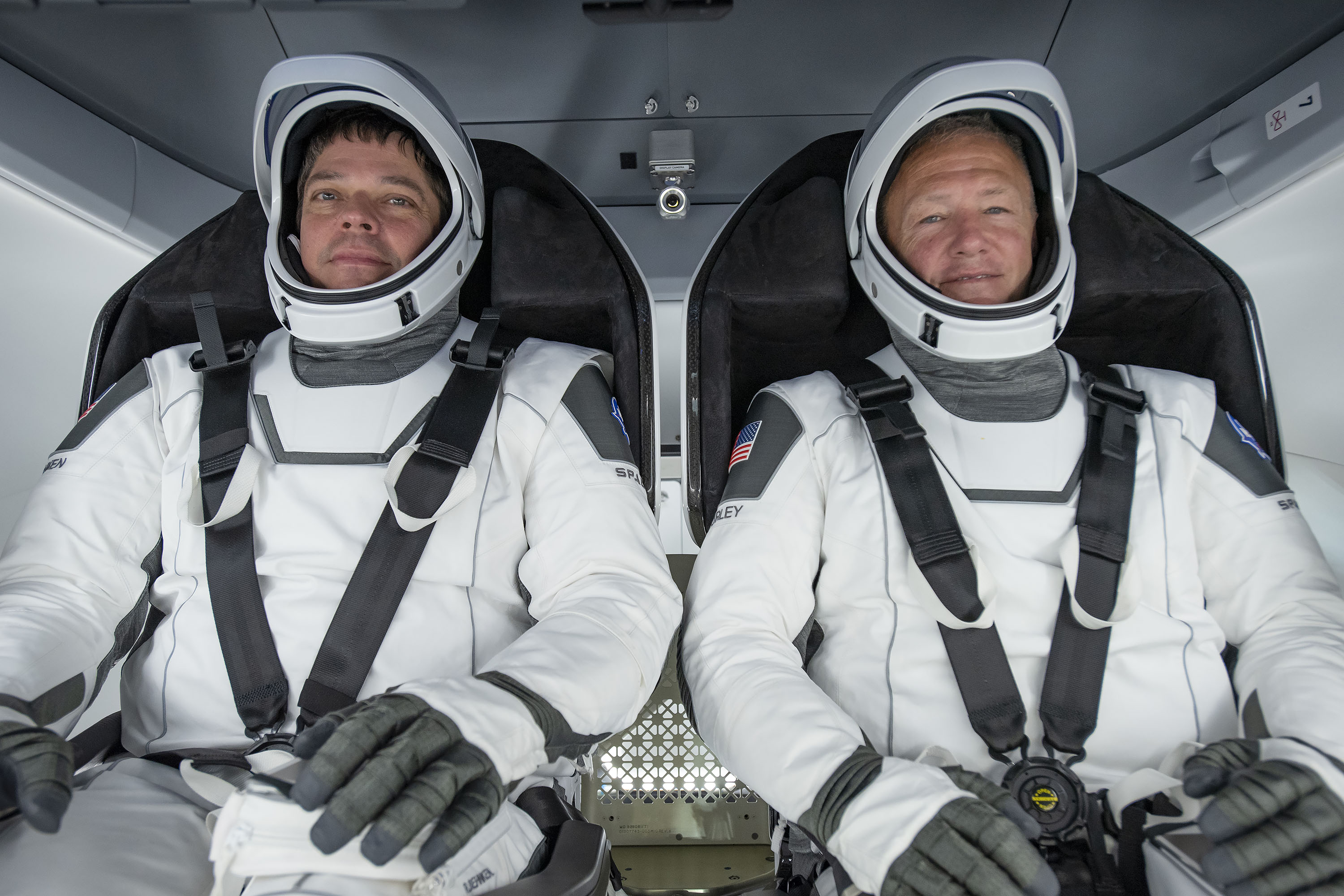
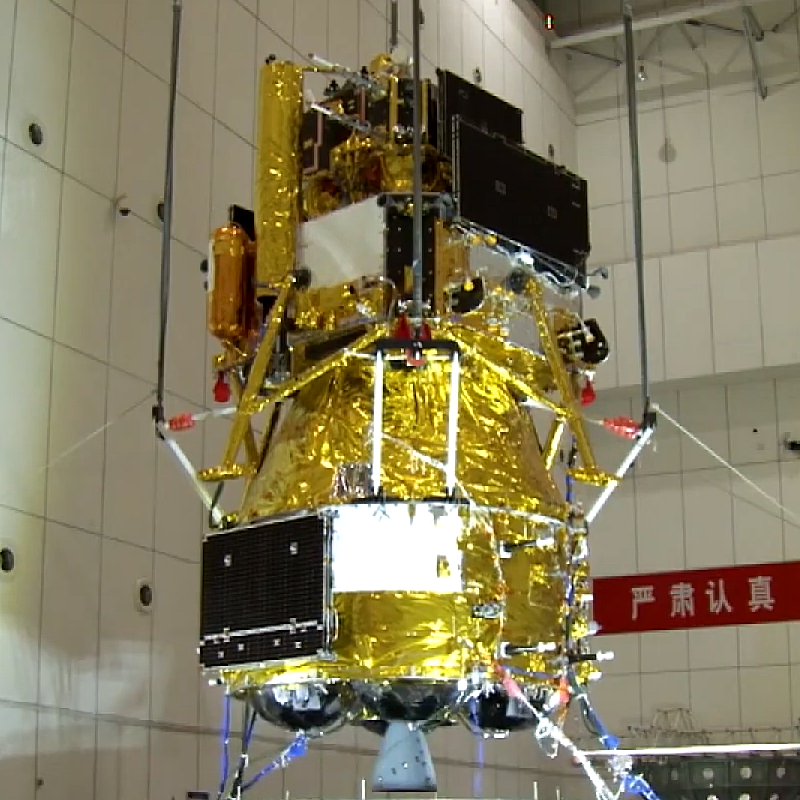
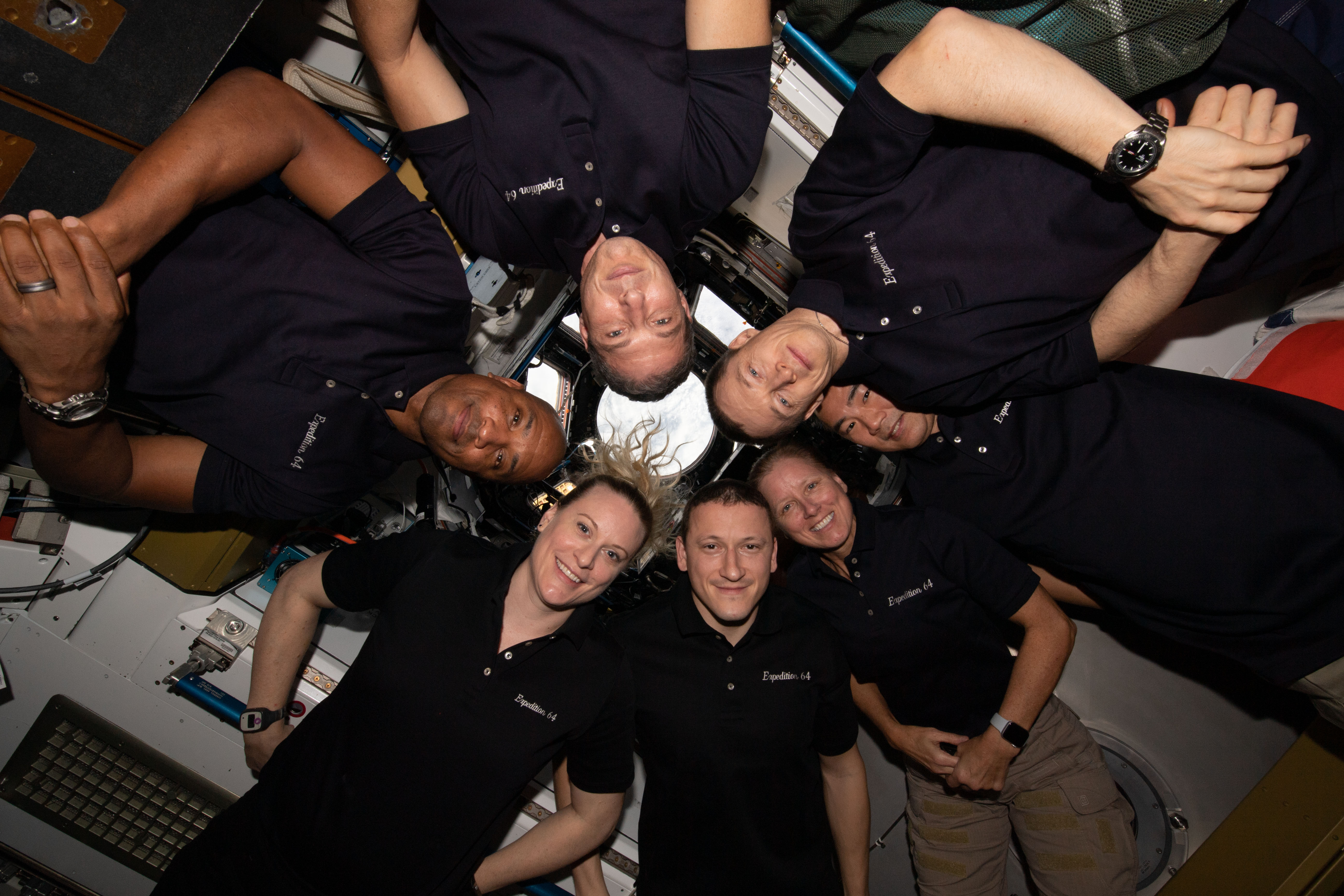
- Highlights from spaceflight in 2020 (Note: Clockwise from top: NASA astronauts Bob Behnken (L) and Doug Hurley (R) of the Crew Dragon Demo-2 mission launched in May 2020, the first-ever crewed orbital spaceflight operated by a commercial provider, and the first crewed orbital launch from the United States since 2011.; Sequence of photographs of the surface of the asteroid Bennu being sampled by OSIRIS-REx for return to Earth.; Operation of the International Space Station by a regular full-time crew of seven commences for the first time in the facility's history in November 2020 during Expedition 64.; Launch of the Chinese Chang'e 5 mission atop a Long March 5 rocket in November 2020. Chang'e 5 was the first sample-return mission to the Moon since Luna 24 in 1976.)

Orbital launches
- First: 7 January
- Last: 29 December
- Total: 114
- Successes: 104
- Failures: 10
- Partial failures: 0
- Catalogued: 104

National firsts
- Spaceflight: Sealand (first payload)
- Satellite: Guatemala; Slovenia; Monaco
- Suborbital launch: Netherlands

Rockets
- Maiden flights: Ceres-1; Kuaizhou 11; LauncherOne; Long March 5B; Long March 7A; Long March 8; Qased; Rocket 3; Chang'e sample return ascent stage
- Retirements: H-IIB; Atlas V 411

Crewed flights
- Orbital: 4
- Suborbital: 0
- Total travellers: 12
- EVAs: 8

2020 in spaceflight

This article documents notable spaceflight events during the year 2020.

== Overview ==
=== Astronomy and astrophysics ===
The GECAM A and B satellites were launched on 9 December. They were built for research in electromagnetic counterparts of gravitational waves.

=== Exploration of the Solar System ===
Three missions to Mars were launched in 2020, including two rovers, two orbiters, and a lander. NASA has launched the Mars 2020 mission, which includes the Perseverance rover and Ingenuity helicopter, and will cache samples for eventual return to Earth. The China National Space Administration (CNSA) has launched its Tianwen-1 mission, which includes an orbiter, a lander, a small rover and a group of deployable and remote cameras; it is China's first mission to another planet using its own delivery vehicle. Finally, the United Arab Emirates, in partnership with American universities, has launched the Hope Mars Mission orbiter on a Japanese rocket.

In November, China launched Chang'e 5, the first sample-return mission to the Moon since Luna 24 in 1976. Chang'e 5 used the recently developed Long March 5 heavy-lift rocket. The mission performed the first-ever robotic lunar orbit rendezvous and returned 1.7 kg (3.7 lb) of lunar soil and rock samples on 16 December.

NASA's OSIRIS-REx mission landed on asteroid 101955 Bennu in October to obtain a surface sample for return to Earth. JAXA's Hayabusa2 mission returned samples of 162173 Ryugu to Earth on 5 December 2020, with its re-entry vehicle recovered in Woomera, Australia.

=== Heliophysics ===
One solar mission was launched: ESA's Solar Orbiter, on 10 February 2020, intended to study the Sun's heliosphere. Parker Solar Probe, launched in 2018, decreased its minimal distance to the Sun further to 14.2 million km.

=== Earth sciences satellites ===
ESA's Sentinel-6 ocean topography measuring satellite was launched on 21 November.

The launch of the TARANIS satellite, planned to study transient events in the Earths atmosphere, failed on 17 November.

=== Human spaceflight ===
In the United States, SpaceX's Dragon 2 spacecraft made its first crewed flight to the International Space Station on 31 May 2020 as part of the Commercial Crew Program, enabling American human orbital spaceflight capability for the first time since the Space Shuttle's retirement in 2011. Dragon 2 became the first commercial system to fly humans to Earth orbit. The second crewed Dragon mission and its first operational mission, Crew-1, launched on 15 November 2020.

China conducted an uncrewed flight test of a next generation crewed spacecraft in May 2020, and continues preparations for the 2021 launch of the Tianhe Core Cabin Module of the Chinese Space Station.

NASA astronaut Christina Koch set a women's record-breaking 328 days spaceflight ending on 6 February 2020. Francisco Rubio holds the all-time American record with 370 days; Cosmonaut Valeri Polyakov, still holding the record, had the all-time spaceflight length record of 437 days but died in 2022. Koch also participated in the first all-female spacewalk with Jessica Meir on 18 October 2019.

=== Rocket innovation ===
SpaceX made three atmospheric test flights with prototypes of its fully reusable two-stage-to-orbit vehicle Starship.

The trend towards cost reduction in access continued and several rockets made their maiden flights in 2020. Despite the increasing competition the cost of delivering cargo to the ISS went up.

=== Satellite innovation ===
SpaceX started operation of its Starlink constellation in late 2020. As of 2 December 2020, 955 satellites have been launched and Starlink is in a public beta testing phase. OneWeb planned to start service in 2020 as well, but filed for bankruptcy in March 2020 after 74 satellites were launched. OneWeb emerged from bankruptcy and plans to restart launches in December 2020.

The Mission Extension Vehicle MEV-1 became the first telerobotically-operated spacecraft to service another satellite on-orbit when it completed the first phase of a 5-year mission to extend the life of the Intelsat 901 (I-901) satellite. In February 2020, MEV-1 captured the communications satellite, which had been moved to graveyard orbit some months before. In April 2020, MEV-1 successfully brought Intelsat-901 it back to position in geosynchronous orbit where it is now expected to operate for another five years. This was a space industry first as satellite servicing had previously been accomplished only with on-orbit human assistance, during the missions to service the Hubble Space Telescope in the early 2000s.

== Orbital launches ==
- ← Jan
- Feb
- Mar
- Apr
- May
- Jun
- Jul
- Aug
- Sep
- Oct
- Nov
- Dec →

Date and time (UTC)	Rocket	Flight number	Launch site		LSP	
Date and time (UTC)	Payload (⚀ = CubeSat)	Operator	Orbit	Function	Decay (UTC)	Outcome
Date and time (UTC)	Remarks					
=== January ===
7 January; 02:19:21	(United States) Falcon 9 Block 5	Starlink V1.0 L2	(United States) Cape Canaveral SLC-40		(United States) SpaceX	
7 January; 02:19:21	(United States) Starlink × 60	SpaceX	Low Earth	Communications	In orbit	Operational
7 January; 15:20:14	(China) Long March 3B/E	3B-Y62	(China) Xichang LC-2		(China) CASC	
7 January; 15:20:14	(China) TJS 5 (Huoyan-1 02)	Ministry of Agriculture and Rural Affairs	Geosynchronous	Early warning	In orbit	Operational
15 January; 02:53:04	(China) Long March 2D	2D-Y58	(China) Taiyuan LC-9		(China) CASC	
15 January; 02:53:04	(China) Jilin-1 Kuanfu-01 (Hongqi-1 H9)	Chang Guang Satellite Technology	Low Earth (SSO)	Earth observation	In orbit	Operational
15 January; 02:53:04	(Argentina) ÑuSat 7 (Aleph-1 07/Sophie)	Satellogic	Low Earth (SSO)	Earth observation	In orbit	Operational
15 January; 02:53:04	(Argentina) ÑuSat 8 (Aleph-1 08/Marie)	Satellogic	Low Earth (SSO)	Earth observation	3 October 2023	Successful
15 January; 02:53:04	(China) Tianqi 5 (Xinzhou/Yunjiang)	Guodian Gaoke	Low Earth (SSO)	Technology demonstration	In orbit	Operational
16 January; 03:02	(China) Kuaizhou-1A	Y9	(China) Jiuquan LS-95A		(China) ExPace	
16 January; 03:02	(China) Yinhe 1 (GS-SparkSat-03/Galaxy-1)	Galaxy Space	Low Earth (SSO)	Technology demonstration	In orbit	Operational
16 January; 21:05	(France) Ariane 5 ECA+	VA251	(France) Kourou ELA-3		(France) Arianespace	
16 January; 21:05	(France) Eutelsat Konnect	Eutelsat	Geosynchronous	Communications	In orbit	Operational
16 January; 21:05	(India) GSAT-30	ISRO	Geosynchronous	Communications	In orbit	Operational
16 January; 21:05	GSAT-30 will replace INSAT-4A.					
29 January; 14:06:49	(United States) Falcon 9 Block 5	Starlink V1.0 L3	(United States) Cape Canaveral SLC-40		(United States) SpaceX	
29 January; 14:06:49	(United States) Starlink × 60	SpaceX	Low Earth	Communications	In orbit	Operational
31 January; 02:56	(New Zealand) Electron	"Birds of a Feather"	(New Zealand) Mahia LC-1A		(United States) Rocket Lab	
31 January; 02:56	(United States) USA-294 (RASR-1)	NRO	Low Earth	Reconnaissance	In orbit	Operational
31 January; 02:56	NROL-151 Mission. First launch contracted via the NRO's Rapid Acquisition of a Small Rocket (RASR) program.					
← Jan; Feb; Mar; Apr; May; Jun; Jul; Aug; Sep; Oct; Nov; Dec →; === February ===
6 February; 21:42:41	(Russia) Soyuz-2.1b / Fregat	ST27	(Kazakhstan) Baikonur Site 31/6		(France) Arianespace / (Russia) Starsem	
6 February; 21:42:41	(United Kingdom) OneWeb × 34	OneWeb	Low Earth	Communications	In orbit	Operational
6 February; 21:42:41	Second OneWeb mission. Baikonur flight 1.					
9 February; 01:34	(Japan) H-IIA 202	F41	(Japan) Tanegashima LA-Y1		(Japan) MHI	
9 February; 01:34	(Japan) IGS-Optical 7	CSICE	Low Earth (SSO)	Reconnaissance	In orbit	Operational
9 February; 15:45	(Iran) Simorgh		(Iran) Semnan LP-2		(Iran) ISA	
9 February; 15:45	(Iran) Zafar 1	IUST	Low Earth	Earth observation	9 February	Launch failure
9 February; 15:45	Satellite failed to reach orbit.					
10 February; 04:03	(United States) Atlas V 411	AV-087	(United States) Cape Canaveral SLC-41		(United States) ULA	
10 February; 04:03	Solar Orbiter	ESA	Heliocentric	Heliophysics	In orbit	Operational
15 February; 20:21:04	(United States) Antares 230+		(United States) MARS LP-0A		(United States) Northrop Grumman	
15 February; 20:21:04	(United States) Cygnus NG-13; S.S. Robert H. Lawrence	NASA	Low Earth (ISS)	ISS logistics	29 May	Successful
15 February; 20:21:04	(United States) Red-Eye 2 (Merlot)	DARPA	Low Earth	Technology demonstration	16 November 2022	Successful
15 February; 20:21:04	(United States) Red-Eye 3 (Cabernet)	DARPA	Low Earth	Technology demonstration	16 November 2022	Successful
15 February; 20:21:04	⚀ (United States) DeMi	MIT	Low Earth	Technology demonstration	8 March 2022	Successful
15 February; 20:21:04	⚀ (United States) TechEdSat-10 (TES-10)	NASA	Low Earth	Technology demonstration	15 March 2021	Successful
15 February; 20:21:04	Red-Eye 2, Red-Eye 3, DeMi, and the ELaNa 30 satellite TES-10 were carried within the Cygnus spacecraft and will be released into orbit at a later date. Red-Eye 2 was deployed into orbit from ISS on 17 June 2020. Red-Eye 3 was deployed into orbit on 23 June 2020. DeMi and TechEdSat-10 were deployed on 13 July.					
17 February; 15:05:55	(United States) Falcon 9 Block 5	Starlink V1.0-L4	(United States) Cape Canaveral SLC-40		(United States) SpaceX	
17 February; 15:05:55	(United States) Starlink × 60	SpaceX	Low Earth	Communications	In orbit	Operational
18 February; 22:18	(France) Ariane 5 ECA	VA252	(France) Kourou ELA-3		(France) Arianespace	
18 February; 22:18	(Japan) JCSAT-17	JSAT	Geosynchronous	Communications	In orbit	Operational
18 February; 22:18	(South Korea) Chollian-2B	KARI	Geosynchronous	Ocean monitoring	In orbit	Operational
19 February; 21:07	(China) Long March 2D	2D-Y61	(China) Xichang LC-3		(China) CASC	
19 February; 21:07	(China) XJS-C	SAST	Low Earth	Technology demonstration	13 July 2023	Successful
19 February; 21:07	(China) XJS-D	SAST	Low Earth	Technology demonstration	4 June 2024	Successful
19 February; 21:07	(China) XJS-E	HIT	Low Earth	Technology demonstration	In orbit	Operational
19 February; 21:07	(China) XJS-F	CAST	Low Earth	Technology demonstration	In orbit	Operational
19 February; 21:07	First Long March 2D launch from Xichang.					
20 February; 08:24:54	(Russia) Soyuz-2.1a / Fregat-M		(Russia) Plesetsk Site 43/3		(Russia) RVSN RF	
20 February; 08:24:54	(Russia) Meridian-M 9 (19L)	Ministry of Defence	Molniya	Communications	In orbit	Operational
← Jan; Feb; Mar; Apr; May; Jun; Jul; Aug; Sep; Oct; Nov; Dec →; === March ===
7 March; 04:50:31	(United States) Falcon 9 Block 5	F9-082	(United States) Cape Canaveral SLC-40		(United States) SpaceX	
7 March; 04:50:31	(United States) SpaceX CRS-20	NASA	Low Earth (ISS)	ISS logistics	7 April; 18:50	Successful
7 March; 04:50:31	⚀ (Japan) G-SATELLITE	TOCOG / University of Tokyo	Low Earth	Space advertising	18 April 2022	Successful
7 March; 04:50:31	⚀ (Guatemala) Quetzal-1 (Guatesat-1)	UVG	Low Earth	Technology demonstration	1 March 2022	Successful
7 March; 04:50:31	⚀ (United States) Lynk-04 (Lynk the World)	Lynk Global	Low Earth	Technology demonstration	In orbit	Operational
7 March; 04:50:31	Final flight of Dragon 1. G-SATELLITE (Gundam Satellite) carries two miniature Gundam figurines (gunpla) to promote the Tokyo 2020 Summer Olympics. Quetzal-1 is Guatemala's first satellite. G-SATELLITE and Quetzal-1 were deployed into orbit from the ISS on 28 April 2020. Lynk the World, Lynk's fourth satellite, was launched to the ISS on this flight and deployed into space by the Cygnus NG-13 spacecraft on 13 May.					
9 March; 11:55	(China) Long March 3B/E	3B-Y69	(China) Xichang LC-2		(China) CASC	
9 March; 11:55	(China) BeiDou-3 G2Q	CNSA	Geosynchronous	Navigation	In orbit	Operational
16 March; 13:34	(China) Long March 7A	Y1	(China) Wenchang LC-2		(China) CASC	
16 March; 13:34	(China) Xinjishu Yanzheng-6 (XJY-6)	TBA	Geosynchronous	Technology demonstration	16 March	Launch failure
16 March; 13:34	First flight of Long March 7A. Failed to reach orbit.					
16 March; 18:28:10	(Russia) Soyuz-2.1b / Fregat-M		(Russia) Plesetsk Site 43/4		(Russia) RVSN RF	
16 March; 18:28:10	(Russia) GLONASS-M 760 (Kosmos 2545)	VKS	Medium Earth	Navigation	In orbit	Operational
18 March; 12:16:39	(United States) Falcon 9 Block 5	Starlink V1.0-L5	(United States) Kennedy LC-39A		(United States) SpaceX	
18 March; 12:16:39	(United States) Starlink × 60	SpaceX	Low Earth	Communications	In orbit	Operational
18 March; 12:16:39	Fifth flight of booster B1048; recovery was not successful.					
21 March; 17:06:58	(Russia) Soyuz-2.1b / Fregat	ST28	(Kazakhstan) Baikonur Site 31/6		(France) Arianespace / (Russia) Starsem	
21 March; 17:06:58	(United Kingdom) OneWeb × 34	OneWeb	Low Earth	Communications	In orbit	Operational
21 March; 17:06:58	Baikonur flight 2.					
24 March; 03:43	(China) Long March 2C	2C-Y42	(China) Xichang LC-3		(China) CASC	
24 March; 03:43	(China) Yaogan 30-06 01	CAS	Low Earth	Reconnaissance	In orbit	Operational
24 March; 03:43	(China) Yaogan 30-06 02	CAS	Low Earth	Reconnaissance	In orbit	Operational
24 March; 03:43	(China) Yaogan 30-06 03	CAS	Low Earth	Reconnaissance	In orbit	Operational
26 March; 20:18	(United States) Atlas V 551	AV-086	(United States) Cape Canaveral SLC-41		(United States) ULA	
26 March; 20:18	(United States) AEHF-6 (USA-298)	U.S. Space Force	Geosynchronous	Military communications	In orbit	Operational
26 March; 20:18	⚀ (United States) TDO-2	U.S. Space Force	Highly elliptical	Laser ranging	28 September 2022	Successful
26 March; 20:18	The TDO-2 Cubesat was also known as OrCa (Orbital Calibration) by the team which designed it at Georgia Tech.					
← Jan; Feb; Mar; Apr; May; Jun; Jul; Aug; Sep; Oct; Nov; Dec →; === April ===
9 April; 08:05:06	(Russia) Soyuz-2.1a		(Kazakhstan) Baikonur Site 31/6		(Russia) Roscosmos	
9 April; 08:05:06	(Russia) Soyuz MS-16	Roscosmos	Low Earth (ISS)	Expedition 62/63	22 October; 02:31	Successful
9 April; 08:05:06	First crewed flight of Soyuz-2.1a.					
9 April; 11:46	(China) Long March 3B/E	3B-Y71	(China) Xichang LC-2		(China) CASC	
9 April; 11:46	(Indonesia) Nusantara Dua (Palapa-N1)	PSN / Indosat	Geosynchronous	Communications	9 April	Launch failure
9 April; 11:46	Intended to replace Palapa-D. Failed to reach orbit.					
22 April; 03:59	(Iran) Qased		(Iran) Shahroud Space Center		(Iran) IRGC	
22 April; 03:59	⚀ (Iran) Noor 1	IRGC	Low Earth	Reconnaissance	13 April 2022	Successful
22 April; 03:59	Maiden flight of the Qased launch vehicle.					
22 April; 19:30:30	(United States) Falcon 9 Block 5	Starlink V1.0-L6	(United States) Kennedy LC-39A		(United States) SpaceX	
22 April; 19:30:30	(United States) Starlink × 60	SpaceX	Low Earth	Communications	In orbit	Operational
25 April; 01:51:41	(Russia) Soyuz-2.1a		(Kazakhstan) Baikonur Site 31/6		(Russia) Roscosmos	
25 April; 01:51:41	(Russia) Progress MS-14 / 75P	Roscosmos	Low Earth (ISS)	ISS logistics	29 April 2021; 00:42:27	Successful
← Jan; Feb; Mar; Apr; May; Jun; Jul; Aug; Sep; Oct; Nov; Dec →; === May ===
5 May; 10:00	(China) Long March 5B	Y1	(China) Wenchang LC-1		(China) CASC	
5 May; 10:00	(China) Chinese next-generation crewed spacecraft	CMSA	Highly elliptical	Flight test	8 May; 05:49	Successful
5 May; 10:00	(China) Flexible Inflatable Cargo Return Module	CASIC	Low Earth	Technology demonstration	6 May	Spacecraft failure
5 May; 10:00	First flight of Long March 5B, testing a new crewed spacecraft. The capsule successfully returned to Earth on 8 May, following on-orbit testing. An experimental secondary payload, meant to test inflatable heat shield reentry technologies, malfunctioned during its return to Earth on 6 May.					
12 May; 01:16	(China) Kuaizhou 1A	Y6	(China) Jiuquan LS-95A		(China) ExPace	
12 May; 01:16	(China) Xingyun-2 01	Xingyun Satellite Co.	Low Earth (SSO)	IoT	In orbit	Operational
12 May; 01:16	(China) Xingyun-2 02	Xingyun Satellite Co.	Low Earth (SSO)	IoT	In orbit	Operational
12 May; 01:16	Xingyun-2 01/02 are the first two small satellites launched for the Xingyun narrow-band Internet of Things constellation to perform data relay and tracking services. The constellation will eventually consist of 80 such satellites.					
17 May; 13:14:00	(United States) Atlas V 501	AV-081	(United States) Cape Canaveral SLC-41		(United States) ULA	
17 May; 13:14:00	(United States) X-37B OTV-6	U.S. Space Force	Low Earth	Technology demonstration	12 November 2022; 10:22	Successful
17 May; 13:14:00	(United States) FalconSAT-8	U.S. Air Force Academy	Low Earth	Technology demonstration	In orbit	Operational
17 May; 13:14:00	USSF-7 mission.					
20 May; 17:31:00	(Japan) H-IIB	F9	(Japan) Tanegashima LA-Y2		(Japan) MHI	
20 May; 17:31:00	(Japan) HTV-9	JAXA	Low Earth (ISS)	ISS logistics	20 August; 07:07	Successful
20 May; 17:31:00	Final HTV cargo launch, and final flight of the H-IIB rocket. The HTV-X and H3 rocket will replace them, respectively.					
22 May; 07:31:17	(Russia) Soyuz-2.1b / Fregat		(Russia) Plesetsk Site 43/4		(Russia) RVSN RF	
22 May; 07:31:17	(Russia) EKS-4 (Tundra 14L)	VKS	Molniya	Early warning	In orbit	Operational
25 May; 19:50	(United States) LauncherOne	F1	(United States) Cosmic Girl, Mojave		(United States) Virgin Orbit	
25 May; 19:50	(United States) Dummy payload	Virgin Orbit	Low Earth	Flight test	25 May	Launch failure
25 May; 19:50	(United States) Starshine 4	NASA	Low Earth	Education	25 May	Launch failure
25 May; 19:50	First orbital flight of LauncherOne. Mission was terminated shortly after first stage ignition.					
29 May; 20:13	(China) Long March 11		(China) Xichang LC-4		(China) CASC	
29 May; 20:13	(China) XJS-G	CAS	Low Earth	Technology demonstration	In orbit	Operational
29 May; 20:13	(China) XJS-H	NUDT	Low Earth	Technology demonstration	In orbit	Operational
30 May; 19:22:45	(United States) Falcon 9 Block 5	F9-085	(United States) Kennedy LC-39A		(United States) SpaceX	
30 May; 19:22:45	(United States) SpX-DM2 Endeavour	SpaceX / NASA	Low Earth (ISS)	Expedition 63 / Crewed flight test	2 August; 18:48	Successful
30 May; 19:22:45	Crew Dragon Demo 2: Crewed flight test of SpaceX Dragon 2 as part of the Commercial Crew Development program. Mission successfully concluded on 2 August after two months in space. First crewed orbital spaceflight with a private spacecraft.					
31 May; 08:53	(China) Long March 2D	2D-Y51	(China) Jiuquan SLS-2		(China) CASC	
31 May; 08:53	(China) Gaofen-9 02	CNSA	Low Earth (SSO)	Earth observation	In orbit	Operational
31 May; 08:53	(China) HEAD-4	HEAD Aerospace	Low Earth (SSO)	AIS ship tracking	In orbit	Operational
← Jan; Feb; Mar; Apr; May; Jun; Jul; Aug; Sep; Oct; Nov; Dec →; === June ===
4 June; 01:25:33	(United States) Falcon 9 Block 5	Starlink V1.0-L7	(United States) Cape Canaveral SLC-40		(United States) SpaceX	
4 June; 01:25:33	(United States) Starlink × 60	SpaceX	Low Earth	Communications	In orbit	Operational
4 June; 01:25:33	Fifth flight of booster B1049; recovery was successful (first booster to be recovered after 5th flight).					
10 June; 18:31:24	(China) Long March 2C	2C-Yxx	(China) Taiyuan LC-9		(China) CASC	
10 June; 18:31:24	(China) HaiYang 1D	Ministry of Natural Resources	Low Earth (SSO)	Earth observation	In orbit	Operational
13 June; 05:12:12	(New Zealand) Electron	"Don't Stop Me Now"	(New Zealand) Mahia LC-1A		(United States) Rocket Lab	
13 June; 05:12:12	(United States) Photon (Pathfinder)	Rocket Lab	Low Earth	Flight test	In orbit	Operational
13 June; 05:12:12	⚀ (United States) ANDESITE Mule + Node × 8	Boston University	Low Earth	Auroral science Technology demonstration	In orbit	Operational
13 June; 05:12:12	⚀ (United States) USA-301	NRO	Low Earth	Reconnaissance	In orbit	Operational
13 June; 05:12:12	⚀ (United States) USA-302	NRO	Low Earth	Reconnaissance	In orbit	Operational
13 June; 05:12:12	⚀ (United States) USA-303	NRO	Low Earth	Reconnaissance	In orbit	Operational
13 June; 05:12:12	⚀ (Australia) M2 Pathfinder	UNSW Canberra, RAAF	Low Earth	Technology demonstration	In orbit	Operational
13 June; 05:12:12	Launch of the ELaNa 32 mission, plus additional payloads. ANDESITE will conduct magnetospheric research using an experimental fractionated formation of eight picosatellites, to be deployed after reaching orbit. Three NRO payloads were deployed as part of RASR-2.					
13 June; 09:21:18	(United States) Falcon 9 Block 5	Starlink V1.0-L8	(United States) Cape Canaveral SLC-40		(United States) SpaceX	
13 June; 09:21:18	(United States) Starlink × 58	SpaceX	Low Earth	Communications	In orbit	Operational
13 June; 09:21:18	(United States) SkySat 16–18	Planet Labs	Low Earth	Earth observation	In orbit	Operational
13 June; 09:21:18	First SmallSat Rideshare mission launch.					
17 June; 07:19	(China) Long March 2D	2D-Y52	(China) Jiuquan SLS-2		(China) CASC	
17 June; 07:19	(China) Gaofen-9 03	CNSA	Low Earth (SSO)	Earth observation	In orbit	Operational
17 June; 07:19	(China) HEAD-5	HEAD Aerospace	Low Earth (SSO)	AIS ship tracking	In orbit	Operational
17 June; 07:19	(China) Pixing-3A	Zhejiang University	Low Earth (SSO)	Technology demonstration	In orbit	Operational
23 June; 01:43	(China) Long March 3B/E	3B-Y68	(China) Xichang LC-2		(China) CASC	
23 June; 01:43	(China) BeiDou-3 G3Q	CNSA	Geosynchronous	Navigation	In orbit	Operational
23 June; 01:43	Last satellite of the BeiDou-3 constellation to be launched, completing the BeiDou Navigation Satellite System.					
30 June; 20:10:46	(United States) Falcon 9 Block 5	F9-088	(United States) Cape Canaveral SLC-40		(United States) SpaceX	
30 June; 20:10:46	(United States) GPS IIIA-03 Matthew Henson	U.S. Space Force	Medium Earth	Navigation	In orbit	Operational
30 June; 20:10:46	Named after African-American polar explorer Matthew Henson. Originally named Columbus.					
← Jan; Feb; Mar; Apr; May; Jun; Jul; Aug; Sep; Oct; Nov; Dec →; === July ===
3 July; 03:10	(China) Long March 4B	4B-Y43	(China) Taiyuan LC-9		(China) CASC	
3 July; 03:10	(China) Gaofen DUOMO (Multi-Mode)	CAST	Low Earth (SSO)	Earth observation	In orbit	Operational
3 July; 03:10	(China) Xibaipo (BY70-2)	Luquan No.1 Middle School	Low Earth (SSO)	Popular science	In orbit	Operational
4 July; 21:19:36	(New Zealand) Electron	"Pics Or It Didn't Happen"	(New Zealand) Mahia LC-1A		(United States) Rocket Lab	
4 July; 21:19:36	(Japan) CE-SAT-IB	Canon Inc.	Low Earth (SSO)	Earth observation	4 July	Launch failure
4 July; 21:19:36	⚀ (United States) Flock-4e × 5	Planet Labs	Low Earth (SSO)	Earth observation	4 July	Launch failure
4 July; 21:19:36	⚀ (United Kingdom) Faraday-1	In-Space Missions	Low Earth (SSO)	Technology demonstration	4 July	Launch failure
4 July; 21:19:36	Failed during second stage flight.					
4 July; 23:44	(China) Long March 2D	2D-Y29	(China) Jiuquan SLS-2		(China) CASC	
4 July; 23:44	(China) Shiyan 6-02	CAST	Low Earth (SSO)	Technology demonstration	In orbit	Operational
6 July; 01:00	(Israel) Shavit-2		(Israel) Palmachim Airbase		(Israel) IAI	
6 July; 01:00	(Israel) Ofek-16	Israel Ministry of Defence	Low Earth	Reconnaissance	In orbit	Operational
9 July; 12:11:04	(China) Long March 3B/E	3B-Y64	(China) Xichang LC-3		(China) CASC	
9 July; 12:11:04	(China) APStar 6D	APT Satellite Co.	Geosynchronous	Communications	In orbit	Operational
10 July; 04:17	(China) Kuaizhou 11		(China) Jiuquan LS-95A		(China) ExPace	
10 July; 04:17	(China) Bilibili Video Satellite (Jilin-1 Gaofen-02E)	Chang Guang Satellite Technology	Low Earth (SSO)	Earth observation	10 July	Launch failure
10 July; 04:17	(China) CentiSpace-1 S2 (Xiangrikui 2)	Beijing Future Navigation Technology	Low Earth (SSO)	Technology demonstration	10 July	Launch failure
10 July; 04:17	First flight of Kuaizhou 11. The rocket failed to reach space.					
15 July; 13:46	(United States) Minotaur IV / Orion 38		(United States) MARS LP-0B		(United States) Northrop Grumman	
15 July; 13:46	(United States) USA-305	NRO	Low Earth	Reconnaissance	In orbit	Operational
15 July; 13:46	(United States) USA-306	NRO	Low Earth	Reconnaissance	In orbit	Operational
15 July; 13:46	(United States) USA-307	NRO	Low Earth	Reconnaissance	In orbit	Operational
15 July; 13:46	(United States) USA-308	NRO	Low Earth	Reconnaissance	In orbit	Operational
15 July; 13:46	NROL-129 mission.					
19 July; 21:58:14	(Japan) H-IIA 202	F42	(Japan) Tanegashima LA-Y1		(Japan) MHI	
19 July; 21:58:14	(United Arab Emirates) Hope (Al-Amal)	Mohammed bin Rashid Space Centre	TMI to Areocentric	Mars orbiter	In orbit	Operational
19 July; 21:58:14	Emirates Mars Mission; first Emirati space probe.					
20 July; 21:30	(United States) Falcon 9 Block 5	F9-089	(United States) Cape Canaveral SLC-40		(United States) SpaceX	
20 July; 21:30	(South Korea) ANASIS-II	Republic of Korea Army	Geosynchronous	Military communications	In orbit	Operational
20 July; 21:30	South Korea's first dedicated military communications satellite.					
23 July; 04:41	(China) Long March 5	Y4	(China) Wenchang LC-1		(China) CASC	
23 July; 04:41	(China) Tianwen-1	CNSA	TMI to Areocentric	Mars orbiter and rover	In orbit	Operational
23 July; 04:41	(China) Tianwen-1 Deployable Camera	CNSA	TMI (Martian flyby)	Photography	In orbit	Successful
23 July; 04:41	(China) Drop Camera	CNSA	TMI to Areocentric	Mars lander / Photography	In orbit	Successful
23 July; 04:41	China's first independent Mars mission.					
23 July; 14:26:21	(Russia) Soyuz-2.1a		(Kazakhstan) Baikonur Site 31/6		(Russia) Roscosmos	
23 July; 14:26:21	(Russia) Progress MS-15 / 76P	Roscosmos	Low Earth (ISS)	ISS logistics	9 February 2021; 09:13	Successful
23 July; 14:26:21	It was initially planned for this Progress vehicle to deorbit the Pirs module to make way for the arrival of Nauka in early 2021. This was later delayed to a subsequent mission. 100th Soyuz-2 launch.					
25 July; 03:13	(China) Long March 4B	4B-Y45	(China) Taiyuan LC-9		(China) CASC	
25 July; 03:13	(China) Ziyuan III-03	Ministry of Natural Resources	Low Earth (SSO)	Earth observation	In orbit	Operational
25 July; 03:13	(China) Tianqi-10	Guodian Gaoke	Low Earth (SSO)	Technology demonstration	In orbit	Operational
25 July; 03:13	(China) Lobster Eye X-ray Explorer (NJU-HKU №1)	NJU / HKU	Low Earth (SSO)	X-ray astronomy	In orbit	Operational
30 July; 11:50	(United States) Atlas V 541	AV-088	(United States) Cape Canaveral SLC-41		(United States) ULA	
30 July; 11:50	(United States) Perseverance	NASA / JPL	TMI to Martian surface	Mars rover	18 February 2021; 20:43:42	Landed on Mars; Operational
30 July; 11:50	(United States) Ingenuity	NASA / JPL	TMI to Martian surface	Mars aircraft	18 February 2021; 20:43:42	Landed on Mars
30 July; 11:50	Mars 2020 mission.					
30 July; 21:25:19	(Russia) Proton-M / Briz-M P4		(Kazakhstan) Baikonur Site 200/39		(Russia) Roscosmos	
30 July; 21:25:19	(Russia) Ekspress-80	RSCC	Geosynchronous	Communications	In orbit	Operational
30 July; 21:25:19	(Russia) Ekspress-103	RSCC	Geosynchronous	Communications	In orbit	Operational
← Jan; Feb; Mar; Apr; May; Jun; Jul; Aug; Sep; Oct; Nov; Dec →; === August ===
6 August; 04:01:54	(China) Long March 2D	2D-Y56	(China) Jiuquan SLS-2		(China) CASC	
6 August; 04:01:54	(China) Gaofen 9-04	CNSA	Low Earth (SSO)	Earth observation	In orbit	Operational
6 August; 04:01:54	(China) Q-SAT	Tsinghua University	Low Earth (SSO)	Gravitational research Atmospheric science	In orbit	Operational
7 August; 05:12:05	(United States) Falcon 9 Block 5	Starlink V1.0-L9	(United States) Kennedy LC-39A		(United States) SpaceX	
7 August; 05:12:05	(United States) Starlink × 57	SpaceX	Low Earth	Communications	In orbit	Operational
7 August; 05:12:05	(United States) BlackSky 5 (Global-7)	BlackSky Global	Low Earth	Earth observation	23 October 2023	Successful
7 August; 05:12:05	(United States) BlackSky 6 (Global-8)	BlackSky Global	Low Earth	Earth observation	In orbit	Operational
7 August; 05:12:05	Starlink SmallSat Rideshare mission to deploy BlackSky Global 7 and 8; first Starlink rideshare contracted with Spaceflight Industries, dubbed "SXRS-1".					
15 August; 22:04	(France) Ariane 5 ECA	VA253	(France) Kourou ELA-3		(France) Arianespace	
15 August; 22:04	(Japan) BSAT-4b	BSAT	Geosynchronous	Communications	In orbit	Operational
15 August; 22:04	(United States) Galaxy 30	Intelsat	Geosynchronous	Communications	In orbit	Operational
15 August; 22:04	(United States) MEV-2	Northrop Grumman	Geosynchronous	Satellite servicing	In orbit	Operational
15 August; 22:04	MEV-2 successfully docked with Intelsat 10-02 on 12 April 2021.					
18 August; 14:31:16	(United States) Falcon 9 Block 5	Starlink V1.0-L10	(United States) Cape Canaveral SLC-40		(United States) SpaceX	
18 August; 14:31:16	(United States) Starlink × 58	SpaceX	Low Earth	Communications	In orbit	Operational
18 August; 14:31:16	(United States) SkySat 19–21	Planet Labs	Low Earth	Earth observation	18, 20: In orbit 19: 26 June 2023	Operational
18 August; 14:31:16	Starlink SmallSat Rideshare mission to deploy SkySat 19–21.					
23 August; 02:27:04	(China) Long March 2D	2D-Y57	(China) Jiuquan SLS-2		(China) CASC	
23 August; 02:27:04	(China) Gaofen 9-05	CNSA	Low Earth (SSO)	Earth observation	In orbit	Operational
23 August; 02:27:04	(China) Tiantuo-5	NUDT	Low Earth (SSO)	Technology demonstration	In orbit	Operational
23 August; 02:27:04	(China) Duo Gongneng Shiyan Weixing	AMS	Low Earth (SSO)	Technology demonstration	In orbit	Operational
30 August; 23:18:56	(United States) Falcon 9 Block 5	F9-092	(United States) Cape Canaveral SLC-40		(United States) SpaceX	
30 August; 23:18:56	(Argentina) SAOCOM 1B	CONAE	Low Earth (SSO)	Earth observation	In orbit	Operational
30 August; 23:18:56	⚀ (United States) EG-2 (Tyvak-0172)	EchoStar	Low Earth (SSO)	Technology demonstration	In orbit	Spacecraft failure
30 August; 23:18:56	⚀ (United States) GNOMES-1	PlanetIQ	Low Earth (SSO)	Radio occultation	In orbit	Operational
30 August; 23:18:56	First polar orbit mission from Cape Canaveral Air Force Station since ESSA-9 in 1969. SmallSat Rideshare mission to deploy Tyvak-0172 and GNOMES-1.					
31 August; 03:05:47	(New Zealand) Electron	"I Can't Believe It's Not Optical"	(New Zealand) Mahia LC-1A		(United States) Rocket Lab	
31 August; 03:05:47	(United States) Capella-2 (Sequoia)	Capella Space	Low Earth	Earth observation	28 February 2023	Successful
31 August; 03:05:47	(United States) Photon (First Light)	Rocket Lab	Low Earth	Flight test	In orbit	Operational
31 August; 03:05:47	Return-to-flight mission for Electron. Second launch of the Photon satellite bus.					
← Jan; Feb; Mar; Apr; May; Jun; Jul; Aug; Sep; Oct; Nov; Dec →; === September ===
3 September; 01:51:10	(Italy) Vega	VV16	(France) Kourou ELV		(France) Arianespace	
3 September; 01:51:10	(Italy) ION SCV-001 Lucas	D-Orbit	Low Earth (SSO)	CubeSat deployer	In orbit	Operational
3 September; 01:51:10	(United States) Athena	Facebook	Low Earth (SSO)	Communications	In orbit	Operational
3 September; 01:51:10	(Canada) ESAIL	exactEarth	Low Earth (SSO)	AIS ship tracking	In orbit	Operational
3 September; 01:51:10	(Canada) GHGSat-C1 (Iris)	GHGSat	Low Earth (SSO)	Earth observation	In orbit	Operational
3 September; 01:51:10	(Canada) (Slovenia) NEMO-HD	UTIAS / Space-SI	Low Earth (SSO)	Earth observation	In orbit	Operational
3 September; 01:51:10	(Argentina) ÑuSat 6 (Hypatia)	Satellogic	Low Earth (SSO)	Earth observation	In orbit	Operational
3 September; 01:51:10	(Spain) UPM-Sat 2	UPM	Low Earth (SSO)	Technology demonstration Education	In orbit	Operational
3 September; 01:51:10	⚀ (France) (Russia) AMICal SAT	CSUG / MSU	Low Earth (SSO)	Auroral science	In orbit	Operational
3 September; 01:51:10	⚀ (Israel) (Switzerland) (Italy) DIDO-3	SpacePharma / ISA / ASI	Low Earth (SSO)	Microgravity research	In orbit	Operational
3 September; 01:51:10	⚀ (United States) Flock-4v × 26	Planet Labs	Low Earth (SSO)	Earth observation	In orbit	Operational
3 September; 01:51:10	⚀ (Spain) FSSCAT A and B	UPC	Low Earth (SSO)	Earth observation	In orbit	Operational
3 September; 01:51:10	⚀ (United States) Lemur-2 × 8	Spire Global	Low Earth (SSO)	Earth observation	In orbit	Operational (6/8)
3 September; 01:51:10	⚀ (Monaco) OSM-1 Cicero	OSM	Low Earth (SSO)	Radio occultation	In orbit	Operational
3 September; 01:51:10	⚀ (Thailand) NAPA-1 (RTAFSAT-1)	RTAF	Low Earth (SSO)	Earth observation	In orbit	Operational
3 September; 01:51:10	⚀ (Belgium) PICASSO	BIRA-IASB	Low Earth (SSO)	Atmospheric research	In orbit	Operational
3 September; 01:51:10	⚀ (Belgium) SIMBA	RMI	Low Earth (SSO)	Technology demonstration	In orbit	Operational
3 September; 01:51:10	⚀ (United States) SpaceBEE × 12	Swarm Technologies	Low Earth (SSO)	Communications	In orbit	Operational
3 September; 01:51:10	⚀ (Canada) TARS	Kepler Communications	Low Earth (SSO)	Communications	In orbit	Operational
3 September; 01:51:10	⚀ (Slovenia) TriSat	University of Maribor	Low Earth (SSO)	Education	In orbit	Operational
3 September; 01:51:10	⚀ (Estonia) TTÜ100	TalTech	Low Earth (SSO)	Earth observation	In orbit	Operational
3 September; 01:51:10	⚀ (United States) EG-1 (Tyvak-0171)	EchoStar	Low Earth (SSO)	Technology demonstration	In orbit	Partial spacecraft failure; Operational
3 September; 01:51:10	Small Satellites Mission Service Proof of Concept (SSMS PoC) mission. Return to flight for Vega after the July 2019 launch failure. 53 satellites were deployed by the SSMS dispenser, including 14 Flock CubeSats carried on SSMS QuadPack deployers, while 12 additional Flock CubeSats were deployed separately by the ION SCV LUCAS satellite. NEMO-HD and TriSat are Slovenia's first satellites, and OSM-1 Cicero is Monaco's first satellite. Two of the Lemur-2 CubeSats failed to deploy, leading them to de-orbit along with the fourth stage of the Vega booster.					
3 September; 12:46:14	(United States) Falcon 9 Block 5	Starlink V1.0-L11	(United States) Kennedy LC-39A		(United States) SpaceX	
3 September; 12:46:14	(United States) Starlink × 60	SpaceX	Low Earth	Communications	In orbit	Operational
4 September; 07:30	(China) Long March 2F/T	2F-T3	(China) Jiuquan SLS-1		(China) CASC	
4 September; 07:30	(China) Reusable Experimental Spacecraft	CASC	Low Earth	Flight test	6 September; 02:00	Successful
4 September; 07:30	(China) Unidentified satellite	CASC	Low Earth	Technology demonstration	In orbit	Operational
4 September; 07:30	Chinese experimental reusable spaceplane.					
7 September; 05:57	(China) Long March 4B	4B-Y46	(China) Taiyuan LC-9		(China) CASC	
7 September; 05:57	(China) Gaofen 11-02	CNSA	Low Earth (SSO)	Earth observation	In orbit	Operational
12 September; 03:19	(United States) Rocket 3	Rocket 3.1	(United States) Kodiak LP-3B		(United States) Astra	
12 September; 03:19	(United States) Astra Test Payload	Astra	Low Earth	Flight test	12 September	Launch failure
12 September; 03:19	First flight of Rocket 3. Failed during first stage flight. Originally intended to be the second of two launches for the DARPA Launch Challenge, Rocket 3.1's launch was Astra's first orbital launch attempt following the loss of Rocket 3.0 during a prelaunch test in March 2020.					
12 September; 05:02	(China) Kuaizhou 1A	Y3	(China) Jiuquan LS-95A		(China) ExPace	
12 September; 05:02	(China) Jilin-1 Gaofen-02C	Chang Guang Satellite Technology	Low Earth (SSO)	Earth observation	12 September	Launch failure
15 September; 01:23	(China) Long March 11H	Y2	(China) De Bo 3 Launch Platform, Yellow Sea		(China) CASC	
15 September; 01:23	(China) Jilin-1 Gaofen-03B × 6	Chang Guang Satellite Technology	Low Earth (SSO)	Earth observation	In orbit	Operational
15 September; 01:23	(China) Jilin-1 Gaofen-03C × 3	Chang Guang Satellite Technology	Low Earth (SSO)	Earth observation	In orbit	Operational
15 September; 01:23	Second Long March 11 sea launch.					
21 September; 05:40	(China) Long March 4B	4B-Y41	(China) Jiuquan SLS-2		(China) CASC	
21 September; 05:40	(China) HaiYang 2C	Ministry of Natural Resources	Low Earth	Earth observation	In orbit	Operational
27 September; 03:23	(China) Long March 4B	4B-Y42	(China) Taiyuan LC-9		(China) CASC	
27 September; 03:23	(China) Huanjing 2A	CNSA	Low Earth (SSO)	Earth observation	In orbit	Operational
27 September; 03:23	(China) Huanjing 2B	CNSA	Low Earth (SSO)	Earth observation	In orbit	Operational
28 September; 11:20	(Russia) Soyuz-2.1b / Fregat		(Russia) Plesetsk Site 43/4		(Russia) Roscosmos	
28 September; 11:20	(Russia) Gonets-M 17	Gonets Satellite System	Low Earth	Communications	In orbit	Operational
28 September; 11:20	(Russia) Gonets-M 18	Gonets Satellite System	Low Earth	Communications	In orbit	Operational
28 September; 11:20	(Russia) Gonets-M 19	Gonets Satellite System	Low Earth	Communications	In orbit	Operational
28 September; 11:20	(Finland) ICEYE X6	ICEYE	Low Earth (SSO)	Earth observation	In orbit	Operational
28 September; 11:20	(Finland) ICEYE X7	ICEYE	Low Earth (SSO)	Earth observation	In orbit	Operational
28 September; 11:20	(Germany) SALSAT	TU Berlin	Low Earth (SSO)	Spectrum analysis	In orbit	Operational
28 September; 11:20	⚀ (Canada) Kepler × 2	Kepler	Low Earth (SSO)	Communications	In orbit	Operational
28 September; 11:20	⚀ (Lithuania) LacunaSat-3	NanoAvionics / Lacuna Space	Low Earth (SSO)	IoT	In orbit	Operational
28 September; 11:20	⚀ (United States) Lemur-2 × 4	Spire Global	Low Earth (SSO)	Earth observation	In orbit	Operational
28 September; 11:20	⚀ (United Arab Emirates) MeznSat	Khalifa University / AURAK	Low Earth (SSO)	Earth observation	In orbit	Operational
28 September; 11:20	⚀ (Germany) NetSat × 4	ZFT	Low Earth (SSO)	Technology demonstration	In orbit	Operational
28 September; 11:20	⚀ (Russia) Descartes	MSU	Low Earth (SSO)	Space weather	In orbit	Operational
28 September; 11:20	⚀ (Russia) Norby	NSU	Low Earth (SSO)	Space weather	In orbit	Operational
28 September; 11:20	⚀ (Russia) Yarilo × 2	BMSTU / Lebedev Physical Institute	Low Earth (SSO)	Heliophysics	In orbit	Operational
← Jan; Feb; Mar; Apr; May; Jun; Jul; Aug; Sep; Oct; Nov; Dec →; === October ===
3 October; 01:16:14	(United States) Antares 230+		(United States) MARS LP-0A		(United States) Northrop Grumman	
3 October; 01:16:14	(United States) Cygnus NG-14; S.S. Kalpana Chawla	NASA	Low Earth (ISS)	ISS logistics	26 January 2021; 20:23	Successful
3 October; 01:16:14	⚀ (United States) Bobcat-1	Ohio University	Low Earth	Technology demonstration	9 April 2022	Successful
3 October; 01:16:14	⚀ (Canada) DESCENT	York University	Low Earth	Technology demonstration	19 June 2022	Successful
3 October; 01:16:14	⚀ (United States) Lemur-2 Baxter-Oliver	Spire Global	Low Earth	Earth observation	20 December 2021	Successful
3 October; 01:16:14	⚀ (United States) (Australia) Lemur-2 Djara	Spire Global / ONI	Low Earth	Technology demonstration	In orbit	Operational
3 October; 01:16:14	⚀ (United States) NEUTRON-1	University of Hawaii	Low Earth	Technology demonstration	25 June 2022	Successful
3 October; 01:16:14	⚀ (Israel) SATLLA-1	Ariel University	Low Earth	Education	In orbit	Operational
3 October; 01:16:14	⚀ (United States) SPOC	University of Georgia	Low Earth	Technology demonstration	25 June 2022	Successful
3 October; 01:16:14	The ELaNa 31 mission launched on this resupply flight. All CubeSats launched on this mission were successfully deployed on 5 November 2020.					
6 October; 11:29:34	(United States) Falcon 9 Block 5	Starlink V1.0-L12	(United States) Kennedy LC-39A		(United States) SpaceX	
6 October; 11:29:34	(United States) Starlink × 60	SpaceX	Low Earth	Communications	In orbit	Operational
11 October; 16:57	(China) Long March 3B/E	3B-Y63	(China) Xichang LC-2		(China) CASC	
11 October; 16:57	(China) Gaofen-13	SASTIND	Geosynchronous	Earth observation	In orbit	Operational
14 October; 05:45:04	(Russia) Soyuz-2.1a		(Kazakhstan) Baikonur Site 31		(Russia) Roscosmos	
14 October; 05:45:04	(Russia) Soyuz MS-17	Roscosmos	Low Earth (ISS)	Expedition 63/64	17 April 2021; 04:55	Successful
18 October; 12:25:57	(United States) Falcon 9 Block 5	Starlink V1.0-L13	(United States) Kennedy LC-39A		(United States) SpaceX	
18 October; 12:25:57	(United States) Starlink × 60	SpaceX	Low Earth	Communications	In orbit	Operational
24 October; 15:31:34	(United States) Falcon 9 Block 5	Starlink V1.0-L14	(United States) Cape Canaveral SLC-40		(United States) SpaceX	
24 October; 15:31:34	(United States) Starlink × 60	SpaceX	Low Earth	Communications	In orbit	Operational
25 October; 19:08:42	(Russia) Soyuz-2.1b / Fregat		(Russia) Plesetsk Site 43/3		(Russia) RVSN RF	
25 October; 19:08:42	(Russia) GLONASS-K 15 (K1 №3)	VKS	Medium Earth	Navigation	In orbit	Operational
25 October; 19:08:42	Also known as GLONASS-K 705. Replaced Kosmos 2516 (GLONASS-M 753) following its failure in November 2020.					
26 October; 15:19	(China) Long March 2C	2C-Y43	(China) Xichang LC-3		(China) CASC	
26 October; 15:19	(China) Yaogan 30-07 01	CAS	Low Earth	Reconnaissance	In orbit	Operational
26 October; 15:19	(China) Yaogan 30-07 02	CAS	Low Earth	Reconnaissance	In orbit	Operational
26 October; 15:19	(China) Yaogan 30-07 03	CAS	Low Earth	Reconnaissance	In orbit	Operational
26 October; 15:19	(China) Tianqi-6	Guodian Gaoke	Low Earth	IoT	In orbit	Operational
28 October; 21:21:27	(New Zealand) Electron	"In Focus"	(New Zealand) Mahia LC-1A		(United States) Rocket Lab	
28 October; 21:21:27	(Japan) CE-SAT-IIB	Canon Inc.	Low Earth (SSO)	Earth observation	In orbit	Operational
28 October; 21:21:27	⚀ (United States) Flock-4e' × 9	Planet Labs	Low Earth (SSO)	Earth observation	In orbit	Operational
← Jan; Feb; Mar; Apr; May; Jun; Jul; Aug; Sep; Oct; Nov; Dec →; === November ===
5 November; 23:24:23	(United States) Falcon 9 Block 5	F9-097	(United States) Cape Canaveral SLC-40		(United States) SpaceX	
5 November; 23:24:23	(United States) GPS IIIA-04 Sacagawea (USA-309)	U.S. Space Force	Medium Earth	Navigation	In orbit	Operational
5 November; 23:24:23	Named after the Shoshone woman Sacagawea, who helped guide the Lewis and Clark Expedition.					
6 November; 03:19	(China) Long March 6	Y3	(China) Taiyuan LC-16		(China) CASC	
6 November; 03:19	(Argentina) ÑuSat × 10	Satellogic	Low Earth (SSO)	Earth observation	In orbit	Operational
6 November; 03:19	(China) Taiyuan (BY-03)	Jinshan Middle School / Origin Space	Low Earth (SSO)	Education / Ultraviolet astronomy	In orbit	Operational
6 November; 03:19	(China) Tianyan 05 (UESTC)	ADASpace / MinoSpace	Low Earth (SSO)	Earth observation	In orbit	Operational
6 November; 03:19	⚀ (China) Beihangkongshi-1	Spacety	Low Earth (SSO)	Technology demonstration	In orbit	Operational
6 November; 03:19	ÑuSat 9–18. Beihangkongshi-1 carries the first iodine electric space propulsion system to be tested in space.					
7 November; 07:12	(China) Ceres-1		(China) Jiuquan LS-95A		(China) Galactic Energy	
7 November; 07:12	(China) Tianqi-11 (Scorpio-1)	Guodian Gaoke	Low Earth (SSO)	IoT	In orbit	Operational
7 November; 07:12	Maiden flight of Ceres-1. Mission designated "I Believe I Can Fly".					
7 November; 09:41	(India) PSLV-DL	C49	(India) Satish Dhawan FLP		(India) ISRO	
7 November; 09:41	(India) EOS-01 (RISAT-2BR2)	ISRO	Low Earth	Reconnaissance	In orbit	Operational
7 November; 09:41	⚀ (Luxembourg) KSM × 4	Kleos Space	Low Earth	Navigation	In orbit	Operational
7 November; 09:41	⚀ (United States) Lemur-2 × 4	Spire Global	Low Earth	Earth observation	In orbit	Operational
7 November; 09:41	⚀ (Lithuania) R2 (LacunaSat-2)	NanoAvionics	Low Earth	Technology demonstration	In orbit	Operational
12 November; 15:59:04	(China) Long March 3B/E	3B-Y73	(China) Xichang LC-2		(China) CASC	
12 November; 15:59:04	(China) Tiantong-1 02	China Satcom	Geosynchronous	Communications	In orbit	Operational
13 November; 22:32	(United States) Atlas V 531	AV-090	(United States) Cape Canaveral SLC-41		(United States) ULA	
13 November; 22:32	(United States) NROL-101 (USA-310)	NRO	Molniya	Reconnaissance	In orbit	Operational
13 November; 22:32	The first GEM 63 solid rocket motors flew on this mission. May be an SDS satellite.					
16 November; 00:27:17	(United States) Falcon 9 Block 5	F9-098	(United States) Kennedy LC-39A		(United States) SpaceX	
16 November; 00:27:17	(United States) SpaceX Crew-1 Resilience	SpaceX / NASA	Low Earth (ISS)	Expedition 64/65	2 May 2021; 06:56	Successful
16 November; 00:27:17	Carrying four astronauts. Second crewed and first operational Crew Dragon mission, as part of the Commercial Crew Program.					
17 November; 01:52:20	(Italy) Vega	VV17	(France) Kourou ELV		(France) Arianespace	
17 November; 01:52:20	(Spain) SEOSat-Ingenio	ESA / CDTI / INTA	Low Earth (SSO)	Earth observation	17 November	Launch failure
17 November; 01:52:20	(France) TARANIS	CNES	Low Earth (SSO)	TLE observation	17 November	Launch failure
17 November; 01:52:20	Mission failure due to human error. Cables leading to thrust vector control actuators were inverted during engine assembly, causing the AVUM upper stage to tumble upon ignition.					
20 November; 02:20:01	(New Zealand) Electron	"Return to Sender"	(New Zealand) Mahia LC-1A		(United States) Rocket Lab	
20 November; 02:20:01	⚀ (United States) Alchemy (DragRacer A)	TriSept	Low Earth (SSO)	Technology demonstration	19 July 2021	Successful
20 November; 02:20:01	⚀ (United States) Augury (DragRacer B)	TriSept	Low Earth (SSO)	Technology demonstration	In orbit	Operational
20 November; 02:20:01	⚀ (France) BRO-2	UnseenLabs	Low Earth (SSO)	SIGINT	In orbit	Operational
20 November; 02:20:01	⚀ (France) BRO-3	UnseenLabs	Low Earth (SSO)	SIGINT	In orbit	Operational
20 November; 02:20:01	⚀ (New Zealand) APSS-1 (Waka Āmiorangi Aotearoa)	University of Auckland	Low Earth (SSO)	Ionospheric research	In orbit	Spacecraft failure
20 November; 02:20:01	⚀ (United States) Landmapper-BC 5	Astro Digital	Low Earth (SSO)	Earth observation	In orbit	Operational
20 November; 02:20:01	⚀ (United States) SpaceBEE × 18	Swarm Technologies	Low Earth (SSO)	Communications	First: 22 October 2022; Last: 14 December 2022	Successful
20 November; 02:20:01	⚀ (New Zealand) SpaceBEE NZ × 6	Swarm Technologies NZ	Low Earth (SSO)	Communications	In orbit	Operational
20 November; 02:20:01	(United States) Gnome Chompski	Gabe Newell	Low Earth	Charity / Mass simulator	In orbit	Operational
20 November; 02:20:01	The DragRacer mission tested Tethers Unlimited's Terminator Tape, an electrodynamic tether that can passively de-orbit satellites in order to reduce space debris. Alchemy, the tethered satellite, was expected to take 45 days to de-orbit; Augury, the untethered satellite, was expected to take up to 9 years. Alchemy re-entered the atmosphere on 19 July 2021, after 241 days in orbit. First stage recovery using parachutes was successfully attempted on this flight, with the intact booster splashing down in the Pacific Ocean.					
21 November; 17:17:08	(United States) Falcon 9 Block 5	F9-099	(United States) Vandenberg SLC-4E		(United States) SpaceX	
21 November; 17:17:08	(United States) Sentinel-6 Michael Freilich (Sentinel-6A)	NASA / NOAA / ESA / Eumetsat	Low Earth	Oceanography	In orbit	Operational
23 November; 20:30:12	(China) Long March 5	Y5	(China) Wenchang LC-1		(China) CASC	
23 November; 20:30:12	(China) Chang'e 5 lander	CNSA	Selenocentric	Lunar lander	1 December; 15:11	Successful
23 November; 20:30:12	(China) Chang'e 5 ascender	CNSA	Selenocentric	Space rendezvous	7 December; 23:30	Successful
23 November; 20:30:12	(China) Chang'e 5 orbiter	CNSA	Initial: Selenocentric; Current: Sun–Earth L_{1}	Lunar orbiter	In orbit	Operational
23 November; 20:30:12	(China) Chang'e 5 return capsule	CNSA	Selenocentric	Lunar sample return	16 December; 17:59	Successful
23 November; 20:30:12	China's first lunar sample return mission. Lunar landing was confirmed on 1 December. The reentry capsule landed on Earth on 16 December and safely delivered 1.731 kg (3.82 lb) of lunar soil and rock samples. The orbiter is currently on an extended mission to the Sun–Earth L_{1} point.					
25 November; 02:13:12	(United States) Falcon 9 Block 5	Starlink V1.0-L15	(United States) Cape Canaveral SLC-40		(United States) SpaceX	
25 November; 02:13:12	(United States) Starlink × 60	SpaceX	Low Earth	Communications	In orbit	Operational
25 November; 02:13:12	First time that a Falcon 9 first-stage booster (B1049.7) has been launched and recovered for the seventh time. 100th launch of Falcon 9.					
29 November; 07:25	(Japan) H-IIA 202	F43	(Japan) Tanegashima LA-Y1		(Japan) MHI	
29 November; 07:25	(Japan) JDRS-1 (LUCAS)	CAS / JAXA	Geosynchronous	Data relay	In orbit	Operational
29 November; 07:25	Japanese Optical Data Relay Satellite.					
← Jan; Feb; Mar; Apr; May; Jun; Jul; Aug; Sep; Oct; Nov; Dec →; === December ===
2 December; 01:33:28	(Russia) Soyuz ST-A / Fregat-M	VS24	(France) Kourou ELS		(France) Arianespace	
2 December; 01:33:28	(United Arab Emirates) FalconEye-2	UAE Armed Forces	Low Earth (SSO)	Reconnaissance (IMINT)	In orbit	Operational
3 December; 01:14:36	(Russia) Soyuz-2.1b / Fregat		(Russia) Plesetsk Site 43/3		(Russia) Roscosmos	
3 December; 01:14:36	(Russia) Gonets-M 20	Gonets Satellite System	Low Earth	Communications	In orbit	Operational
3 December; 01:14:36	(Russia) Gonets-M 21	Gonets Satellite System	Low Earth	Communications	In orbit	Operational
3 December; 01:14:36	(Russia) Gonets-M 22	Gonets Satellite System	Low Earth	Communications	In orbit	Operational
3 December; 01:14:36	⚀ (Russia) ERA-1 (Kosmos 2548)	Ministry of Defence	Low Earth	Military	In orbit	Operational
6 December; 03:58	(China) Long March 3B/E	3B-Y70	(China) Xichang LC-3		(China) CASC	
6 December; 03:58	(China) Gaofen 14	SASTIND	Low Earth (SSO)	Earth observation	In orbit	Operational
6 December; 03:58	First Long March 3B launch to Sun-synchronous orbit.					
6 December; 16:17:08	(United States) Falcon 9 Block 5	F9-101	(United States) Kennedy LC-39A		(United States) SpaceX	
6 December; 16:17:08	(United States) SpaceX CRS-21	NASA	Low Earth (ISS)	ISS logistics	14 January 2021	Successful
6 December; 16:17:08	(United States) Nanoracks Bishop Airlock	Nanoracks / NASA	Low Earth (ISS)	Satellite deployment / ISS assembly	In orbit	Operational
6 December; 16:17:08	First flight of the cargo version of Dragon 2. Nanoracks Bishop Airlock launched aboard this resupply flight. The airlock is now docked to the ISS as of 12/22/20.					
9 December; 20:14	(China) Long March 11	Y9	(China) Xichang LC-4		(China) CASC	
9 December; 20:14	(China) GECAM A and B	CAS	Low Earth	Gravitational-wave astronomy	In orbit	Operational
11 December; 01:09	(United States) Delta IV Heavy	D-385	(United States) Cape Canaveral SLC-37B		(United States) ULA	
11 December; 01:09	(United States) Orion 10 / USA-311	NRO	Geosynchronous	Reconnaissance	In orbit	Operational
11 December; 01:09	NROL-44 mission. First launch from the newly renamed Cape Canaveral Space Force Station.					
13 December; 17:30	(United States) Falcon 9 Block 5	F9-102	(United States) Cape Canaveral SLC-40		(United States) SpaceX	
13 December; 17:30	(United States) SXM-7	SiriusXM	Geosynchronous	Communications	In orbit	Spacecraft failure
13 December; 17:30	Replacement for the XM-3 satellite launched in 2005. While conducting in-orbit testing the satellite experienced payload unit failures. Exact cause has not been announced.					
14 December; 05:50:00	(Russia) Angara A5 / Briz-M		(Russia) Plesetsk Site 35/1		(Russia) RVSN RF	
14 December; 05:50:00	(Russia) IPM №2 (MGM №2)	VKS	Geosynchronous	Flight test	In orbit	Successful
14 December; 05:50:00	Second orbital flight of Angara A5.					
15 December; 10:09:27	(New Zealand) Electron	"The Owl's Night Begins"	(New Zealand) Mahia LC-1A		(United States) Rocket Lab	
15 December; 10:09:27	(Japan) StriX-α	Synspective	Low Earth (SSO)	Earth observation	In orbit	Operational
15 December; 10:09:27	First of 16 dedicated launches for Synspective's StriX constellation, taking place from 2020 to 2027.					
15 December; 20:55	(United States) Rocket 3	Rocket 3.2	(United States) Kodiak LP-3B		(United States) Astra	
15 December; 20:55	No payload	Astra	Low Earth (SSO)	Flight test	15 December	Launch failure
15 December; 20:55	Second of three Rocket 3 orbital launch attempts. Successfully achieved an apogee of 390 km (240 mi), but fell just short of orbital velocity due to a suboptimal second stage fuel mixture.					
17 December; 10:11	(India) PSLV-XL	C50	(India) Satish Dhawan SLP		(India) ISRO	
17 December; 10:11	(India) CMS-01 (GSAT-12R)	ISRO	Geosynchronous	Communications	In orbit	Operational
17 December; 10:11	Replacement for GSAT-12.					
18 December; 12:26:26	(Russia) Soyuz-2.1b / Fregat	ST29	(Russia) Vostochny Site 1S		(France) Arianespace / (Russia) Starsem	
18 December; 12:26:26	(United Kingdom) OneWeb × 36	OneWeb	Low Earth	Communications	In orbit	Operational
18 December; 12:26:26	Vostochny flight 1. Third large batch of satellites, and the first after bankruptcy in early 2020.					
19 December; 14:00	(United States) Falcon 9 Block 5	F9-103	(United States) Kennedy LC-39A		(United States) SpaceX	
19 December; 14:00	(United States) USA-312	NRO	Low Earth	Reconnaissance	In orbit	Operational
19 December; 14:00	(United States) USA-313	NRO	Low Earth	Reconnaissance	In orbit	Operational
19 December; 14:00	NROL-108 mission, satellites being possibly SpaceX Starshield prototypes.					
22 December; 04:37:37	(China) Long March 8	Y1	(China) Wenchang LC-2		(China) CASC	
22 December; 04:37:37	(China) Xinjishu Yanzheng-7 (XJY-7)	CAST	Low Earth (SSO)	Technology demonstration	16 October 2025	Successful
22 December; 04:37:37	(China) Hisea-1	Spacety	Low Earth (SSO)	Earth observation	5 September 2024	Successful
22 December; 04:37:37	(China) Tianqi-8 (Ping'an-1)	Guodian Gaoke	Low Earth (SSO)	IoT	14 June 2024	Successful
22 December; 04:37:37	⚀ (China) Yuanguang	Spacety / HBUT	Low Earth (SSO)	Space tribology	15 June 2024	Successful
22 December; 04:37:37	⚀ (Ethiopia) (China) ET-SMART-RSS (Zhixing-1A)	ESSTI / SMART	Low Earth (SSO)	Earth observation	21 October 2023	Successful
22 December; 04:37:37	First flight of Long March 8.					
27 December; 15:44	(China) Long March 4C	4C-Y35	(China) Jiuquan SLS-2		(China) CASC	
27 December; 15:44	(China) Yaogan 33(R)	CAS	Low Earth (SSO)	Reconnaissance	In orbit	Operational
27 December; 15:44	⚀ (China) Weina-2	SECM	Low Earth (SSO)	Technology demonstration	In orbit	Operational
27 December; 15:44	Replacement for Yaogan 33, which was lost in a launch failure on 22 May 2019.					
29 December; 16:42:07	(Russia) Soyuz ST-A / Fregat-M	VS25	(France) Kourou ELS		(France) Arianespace	
29 December; 16:42:07	(France) CSO-2	CNES / DGA	Low Earth (SSO)	Reconnaissance	In orbit	Operational

- ← Jan
- Feb
- Mar
- Apr
- May
- Jun
- Jul
- Aug
- Sep
- Oct
- Nov
- Dec →

== Suborbital flights ==
Date and time (UTC)	Rocket	Flight number	Launch site		LSP	
Date and time (UTC)	Payload (⚀ = CubeSat)	Operator	Orbit	Function	Decay (UTC)	Outcome
Date and time (UTC)	Remarks					
9 January; 08:00:00	(Japan) S-310	45	(Japan) Uchinoura		(Japan) JAXA	
9 January; 08:00:00		JAXA	Suborbital	Technology	9 January	Successful
9 January; 08:00:00	Apogee: 131 km					
19 January	(India) K-4		(India) Visakhapatnam		(India) Indian Navy	
19 January		Indian Navy	Suborbital	Missile test	19 January	Successful
19 January	Apogee: 500 km? The missile was from a submerged platform located in the coastal waters of Andhra Pradesh. This test was undertaken in full operational configuration during which the missile traversed a distance of over 3,500 km in approximately 21 minutes.					
19 January; 15:30	(United States) Falcon 9 Block 5		(United States) Kennedy LC-39A		(United States) SpaceX	
19 January; 15:30	(United States) SpaceX Dragon 2	SpaceX	Suborbital	Test flight	19 January	Successful
19 January; 15:30	Apogee: 40 km. In-flight abort test at Max Q. It was planned that the capsule from the first demonstration mission SpX-DM1 would be used, but that capsule having been subsequently destroyed after the mission in a fire during a ground-test, a new capsule was assigned for this mission.					
24 January	(India) K-4		(India) Visakhapatnam		(India) Indian Navy	
24 January		Indian Navy	Suborbital	Missile test	24 January	Successful
24 January	Apogee: 500 km?					
27 January; 13:40	(Canada) Black Brant IX		(United States) Poker Flat Research Range		(United States) NASA	
27 January; 13:40	(United States) PolarNOx 2	Virginia Tech	Suborbital	Thermosphere research	27 January	Successful
27 January; 13:40	Apogee: 260 kilometres (160 mi)					
5 February; 08:33	(United States) Minuteman-III		(United States) Vandenberg Air Force Base LF-04		(United States) US Air Force	
5 February; 08:33	(United States) FTU-2	US Air Force	Suborbital	Test flight	5 February	Successful
12 February	(United States) UGM-133 Trident II		(United States) USS Maine (SSBN-741), Pacific Missile Range Facility		(United States) US Navy	
12 February		US Navy	Suborbital	Missile test	12 February	Successful
12 February	Demonstration and Shakedown Operation (DASO) 30					
16 February	(United States) UGM-133 Trident II		(United States) USS Maine (SSBN-741), Pacific Missile Range Facility		(United States) US Navy	
16 February		US Navy	Suborbital	Missile test	16 February	Successful
16 February	Demonstration and Shakedown Operation (DASO) 30					
19 February; 23:14	(United States) Improved Malemute		(Sweden) Esrange		(Sweden) SSC	
19 February; 23:14	(Sweden) (Germany) SPIDER-2	SNSA	Suborbital	Atmospheric analysis	19 February	Successful
19 February; 23:14	Apogee 120 km (74 mi)					
20 March; 08:30	(United States) UGM-27 Polaris (STARS)		(United States) Barking Sands LC-42		(United States) US Navy	
20 March; 08:30	(United States) C-HGB	US Navy	Suborbital	Technology	20 March	Successful
20 March; 08:30	Common-Hypersonic Glide Body, successful hypersonic glide vehicle test.					
15 April; 15:00	(Russia) PL-19 "Nudol"		(Russia) Plesetsk cosmodrome		(Russia)	
15 April; 15:00			Suborbital	Missile test	15 April	Successful
15 April; 15:00	Anti-satellite missile test					
12 June	(France) M51		(France) Le Téméraire, Audierne Bay		(France) DGA/Marine nationale	
12 June		DGA/Marine nationale	Suborbital	Test flight	12 June	Successful
12 June	Apogee: 1,000 kilometres (620 mi)?					
14 June	(Japan) Momo 5		(Japan) Taiki Aerospace Research Field		(Japan) Interstellar Technologies	
14 June	(Japan)	Kochi University of Technology	Suborbital	?	14 June	Launch failure
14 June	About 35 seconds into flight, sparks were observed near the engine nozzle. About thirty seconds later, the engine failed and the rocket tumbled out of control.					
4 August; 07:21	(United States) Minuteman-III		(United States) Vandenberg Air Force Base LF-10		(United States) US Air Force	
4 August; 07:21	(United States) 3x Mk 12 RV	US Air Force	Suborbital	Test flight	4 August	Successful
4 August; 07:21	Mission GT-235GM					
12 August	(Israel) Silver Sparrow?		F-15 Eagle, Israel		(Israel) IAF	
12 August		Israeli Air Force	Suborbital	ABM target	12 August	Successful
12 August	Apogee: ~100 kilometres (62 mi)?, AST-18a target, successfully intercepted by Arrow 2					
16 August	(United Kingdom) Skylark Micro	Launch I	(Iceland) Langanes Peninsula Launch Site		(United Kingdom) Skyrora	
16 August		Skyrora	Suborbital	Test flight	16 August	Successful
16 August	Maiden flight of Skylark Micro. Apogee: 26,86 km.					
2 September; 07:03	(United States) Minuteman-III		(United States) Vandenberg Air Force Base LF-04		(United States) US Air Force	
2 September; 07:03	(United States) 1x RV	US Air Force	Suborbital	Test flight	2 September	Successful
2 September; 07:03	Mission GT-233GM					
8 September; 18:00	(Canada) Black Brant IX		(United States) White Sands Missile Range		(United States) NASA	
8 September; 18:00	(United States) (Japan) DUST-2	NASA / JAXA	Suborbital	Formation and growth of small particles	8 September	Successful
8 September; 18:00	Apogee: 346 kilometres (215 mi)					
19 September; 00:39	(Netherlands) T-Minus Engineering Dart	TED-1	(Australia) Koonibba Test Range		(Netherlands) T-Minus Engineering	
19 September; 00:39	(Australia) DEWC-SP1	DEWC Systems	Suborbital	Miniaturized Orbital Electronic Warfare Sensor System	19 September	Successful
19 September; 00:39	First flight of the T-minus Dart. First Dutch space launch					
19 September; 02:19	(Netherlands) T-Minus Engineering Dart	TED-2	(Australia) Koonibba Test Range		(Netherlands) T-Minus Engineering	
19 September; 02:19	(Australia) DEWC-SP2	DEWC Systems	Suborbital	Miniaturized Orbital Electronic Warfare Sensor System	19 September	Successful
19 September; 02:19	Flew 1 hour and 40 minutes after the previous flight.					
13 October; 13:36	(United States) New Shepard	NS-13	(United States) Corn Ranch		(United States) Blue Origin	
13 October; 13:36	(United States) Crew Capsule 2.0	Blue Origin	Suborbital	Test flight/Payload delivery	13 October	Successful
13 October; 13:36	(Principality of Sealand) (United States) Postcards	Club For The Future	Suborbital	Education	13 October	Successful
13 October; 13:36	7th flight of the same capsule and booster. Onboard payloads include Space Lab Technologies, Southwest Research Institute, seeds and postcards for Club for the Future, and multiple payloads for NASA including SPLICE to test future lunar landing technologies in support of the Artemis program. A Sealandic postcard was the first payload from Sealand to be sent into space.					
29 October; 19:27	(United States) Minuteman-III		(United States) Vandenberg Air Force Base LF-09		(United States) US Air Force	
29 October; 19:27	(United States) 1x RV	US Air Force	Suborbital	Test flight	29 October	Successful
29 October; 19:27	Mission GT-236GM					
29 October	(Turkey) SR-0		(Turkey) Sinop		(Turkey) Roketsan	
29 October	(Turkey)	Roketsan	Suborbital	Test flight	29 October	Successful
29 October	Apogee 136 kilometers (84.5 mi).					
2 November; 10:20	(Canada) Black Brant IX		(United States) White Sands Missile Range		(United States) NASA	
2 November; 10:20	(United States) DEUCE	NASA	Suborbital	Astronomy	2 November	Successful
2 November; 10:20	Apogee: 285 kilometres (177 mi)					
17 November; 05:50	(United States) ICBM-T2	FTM-44	(Marshall Islands) Ronald Reagan Ballistic Missile Defense Test Site		(United States) US Missile Defense Agency	
17 November; 05:50	(United States) SM-3 target	(United States)	Suborbital	Target for SM-3 FMT-44	17 November	Successful
17 November; 05:50	ICBM target for and intercepted by SM-3 FMT-44.					
17 November	(United States) SM-3 Block IIA	FTM-44	(United States) USS John Finn		(United States) US Missile Defense Agency/U.S. Navy	
17 November	(United States) Kill vehicle	(United States) U.S. Navy	Suborbital	ICBM interceptor	17 November	Successful
17 November	Intercepted ICBM-T2 in space.					
9 December	(Russia) R-29RMU		(Russia) Karelia (submarine), Barents Sea		(Russia) Russian Ministry of Defense	
9 December	1x RV?		Suborbital	Missile test	9 December	Successful
9 December	(Russia) RS-24 Yars		(Russia) Plesetsk cosmodrome		(Russia) Russian Ministry of Defense	
9 December	1x RV?		Suborbital	Missile test	9 December	Successful
12 December; 16:15	(United States) SpaceShipTwo	19	(United States) Spaceport America		(United States) Virgin Galactic	
12 December; 16:15	(United States) VSS Unity	Virgin Galactic	Suborbital	Crewed spaceflight	12 December	Aborted
12 December; 16:15	First attempted crewed spaceflight from New Mexico. One second after ignition, the spacecraft's engine aborted, and shut down. The two crewmembers aboard, David Mackay and Frederick Sturckow, piloted the spacecraft to a safe landing.					
12 December	(Russia) RSM-56 Bulava		(Russia) K-551 Vladimir Monomakh (submarine), Sea of Okhotsk		(Russia) Russian Ministry of Defense	
12 December	1x RV	Russian Ministry of Defense	Suborbital	Missile test	12 December	Successful
12 December	Rapid launch of four intercontinental ballistic missiles.					
12 December	(Russia) RSM-56 Bulava		(Russia) K-551 Vladimir Monomakh (submarine), Sea of Okhotsk		(Russia) Russian Ministry of Defense	
12 December	1x RV	Russian Ministry of Defense	Suborbital	Missile test	12 December	Successful
12 December	Rapid launch of four intercontinental ballistic missiles.					
12 December	(Russia) RSM-56 Bulava		(Russia) K-551 Vladimir Monomakh (submarine), Sea of Okhotsk		(Russia) Russian Ministry of Defense	
12 December	1x RV	Russian Ministry of Defense	Suborbital	Missile test	12 December	Successful
12 December	Rapid launch of four intercontinental ballistic missiles.					
12 December	(Russia) RSM-56 Bulava		(Russia) K-551 Vladimir Monomakh (submarine), Sea of Okhotsk		(Russia) Russian Ministry of Defense	
12 December	1x RV	Russian Ministry of Defense	Suborbital	Missile test	12 December	Successful
12 December	Rapid launch of four intercontinental ballistic missiles.					
16 December	(Russia) PL-19 "Nudol"		(Russia) Plesetsk cosmodrome		(Russia)	
16 December			Suborbital	Missile test	16 December	Successful
16 December	Anti-satellite missile test					

== Launches from the Moon ==
Date and time (UTC)	Rocket	Flight number	Launch site		LSP	
Date and time (UTC)	Payload (⚀ = CubeSat)	Operator	Orbit	Function	Decay (UTC)	Outcome
Date and time (UTC)	Remarks					
3 December; 15:10	(China) Chang'e 5 ascent vehicle		Chang'e 5 descent stage, Mons Rümker		CNSA	
3 December; 15:10	(China) Lunar soil sample container	(China) CNSA	Selenocentric orbit	Sample return	7 December 2020	Successful
3 December; 15:10	Sample return mission. First flight of the Chang'e ascent stage. Rendezvoused and docked with the Chang'e 5 Earth return vehicle to transfer lunar soil samples for return to Earth.					

== Deep-space rendezvous ==
Date (UTC)	Spacecraft	Event	Remarks
29 January	Parker Solar Probe	4th perihelion	
17 February	Juno	25th perijove of Jupiter	
10 April	Juno	26th perijove	
10 April 04:25	BepiColombo	Gravity assist at Earth	
2 June	Juno	27th perijove	
7 June	Parker Solar Probe	5th perihelion	
11 July	Parker Solar Probe	Third gravity assist at Venus	
25 July	Juno	28th perijove	
16 September	Juno	29th perijove	
27 September	Parker Solar Probe	6th perihelion	
16 October 03:58	BepiColombo	First gravity assist at Venus	
20 October	OSIRIS-REx	Touch-and-go maneuver on Bennu for sampling	
8 November	Juno	30th perijove	
28 November	Chang'e 5	Lunar orbital insertion	
1 December	Chang'e 5 lander and ascent vehicle	Lunar landing	Sample return mission successfully landed in Mons Rümker region of Oceanus Procellarum, coordinates 43.0576°N 51.9161°E.
5 December	Chang'e 5 ascent vehicle and orbiter	Lunar orbit rendezvous	First-ever robotic rendezvous and docking in lunar orbit
5 December	Hayabusa2	Sample return to Earth	
7 December	Chang'e 5 ascent vehicle	Lunar impact	Intentional de-orbit following docking and transfer of samples to orbiter and reentry capsule
13 December	Chang'e 5 orbiter and reentry capsule	Trans-Earth injection	
16 December	Chang'e 5 reentry capsule	Lunar sample return	Perform a skip reentry to reduce the heating loads
26 December	Solar Orbiter	First gravity assist at Venus	
30 December	Juno	31st perijove	

== Extravehicular activities (EVAs) ==
Start date/time	Duration	End time	Spacecraft	Crew	Remarks
15 January 18:04	7 hours 29 minutes	01:33	Expedition 61 ISS Quest	(United States) Christina Koch (United States) Jessica Meir	During the 7-hour, 29-minute spacewalk, the two NASA astronauts successfully replaced nickel-hydrogen batteries with newer, more powerful lithium-ion batteries for the power channel on one pair of the station's solar arrays.
20 January 17:33	6 hours 58 minutes	00:31	Expedition 61 ISS Quest	(United States) Christina Koch (United States) Jessica Meir	During the six hour and 58-minute spacewalk, the two NASA astronauts successfully completed the battery upgrade for one channel on one pair of the station's solar arrays. Work included removing the last two nickel-hydrogen batteries from this area of the station's backbone near the port solar array and moving them to an external platform. The batteries will be stored there until they can be disposed of in the next Japanese HTV cargo spacecraft after it delivers tons of supplies to the space station later this year. Meir and Koch also installed the sixth and final new lithium-ion battery, and ground controllers verified the new batteries powered up successfully to provide an improved and more efficient power capacity for station operations.
25 January 11:04	6 hours 16 minutes	17:20	Expedition 61 ISS Quest	(United States) Andrew Morgan (Italy) Luca Parmitano	During the 6 hour, 16 minute spacewalk, the two astronauts successfully completed leak checks for the cooling system on the Alpha Magnetic Spectrometer (AMS) and opened a valve to being pressurizing the system. Preliminary testing shows AMS is responding as expected.
26 June 11:02	6 hours 7 minutes	17:39	Expedition 63 ISS Quest	(United States) Chris Cassidy (United States) Robert Behnken	The spacewalkers removed five of six aging nickel-hydrogen batteries for one of two power channels for the starboard 6 (S6) truss, installed two of three new lithium-ion batteries, and installed two of three associated adapter plates that are used to complete the power circuit to the new batteries. Mission control reports that the two new batteries are working. The two NASA astronauts completed all the work planned for this first of four spacewalks to replace batteries that provide power for the station's solar arrays on the starboard truss of the complex as well as initial tasks originally planned for the second scheduled spacewalk next Wednesday. The new batteries provide an improved and more efficient power capacity for operations.
1 July 11:13	6 hours 1 minutes	17:14	Expedition 63 ISS Quest	(United States) Chris Cassidy (United States) Robert Behnken	During the six hour and one-minute spacewalk, the two NASA astronauts completed half the work to upgrade the batteries that provide power for one channel on one pair of the station's solar arrays. The new batteries provide an improved and more efficient power capacity for operations. They successfully moved and connected one new, powerful lithium-ion battery and its adapter place to complete the circuit to the new battery and relocated one aging nickel-hydrogen battery to an external platform for future disposal.
16 July 11:10	6 hours	17:10	Expedition 63 ISS Quest	(United States) Chris Cassidy (United States) Robert Behnken	The two NASA astronauts completed all the work to replace batteries that provide power for the International Space Station's solar arrays on the starboard truss of the complex. The new batteries provide an improved and more efficient power capacity for operations. The spacewalkers removed six aging nickel-hydrogen batteries for the second of two power channels for the starboard 6 (S6) truss, installed three new lithium-ion batteries, and installed the three associated adapter plates that are used to complete the power circuit to the new batteries.
21 July 11:12	5 hours 29 minutes	16:41	Expedition 63 ISS Quest	(United States) Chris Cassidy (United States) Robert Behnken	The two NASA astronauts installed a protective storage unit that includes two Robotic External Leak Locator (RELL) units the Canadian Space Agency's Dextre robot can use to detect leaks of ammonia, which is used to operate the station's cooling system. They removed two lifting fixtures at the base of station solar arrays on the near port truss, or backbone, of the station. The "H-fixtures" were used for ground processing of the solar arrays prior to their launch. They then completed tasks to prepare the outside of the Tranquility module for the arrival later this year of the Nanoracks commercial airlock on a SpaceX cargo delivery mission. They also routed Ethernet cables and removed a lens filter cover from an external camera.
18 November 15:12	6 hours 48 minutes	22:00	Expedition 64 Poisk Airlock	(Russia) Sergey Ryzhikov (Russia) Sergey Kud-Sverchkov	Spacewalk was conducted using Poisk Module airlock for the first time in 11 years. This spacewalk includes works in preparation of Pirs module decommissioning and departure: relocated antenna and repositioned instruments Replacement of fluid flow regulator was not done as astronauts were unable to open new module compartment, this task was deferred to a future spacewalk.

== Orbital launch statistics ==
=== By country ===
For the purposes of this section, the yearly tally of orbital launches by country assigns each flight to the country of origin of the rocket, not to the launch services provider or the spaceport. For example, Soyuz launches by Arianespace in Kourou are counted under Russia because Soyuz-2 is a Russian rocket. Launches from the Moon are not included in the statistics.

Country	Launches	Successes	Failures	Partial failures
China	39	35	4	0
France	3	3	0	0
India	2	2	0	0
Iran	2	1	1	0
Israel	1	1	0	0
Italy	2	1	1	0
Japan	4	4	0	0
Russia	17 (Note: Includes two European Soyuz launches from Kourou, French Guiana by Arianespace.)	17	0	0
United States	44 (Note: Includes Electron launches from Māhia)	40	4	0
World	114	104	10	0

=== By rocket ===
- Antares 230+
- Ariane 5
- Atlas V
- Electron
- Falcon 9 new
- Falcon 9 reused
- Falcon Heavy
- H-IIA
- H-IIB
- Kuaizhou 1A
- Kuaizhou 11
- Long March 2
- Long March 3
- Long March 4
- Long March 5
- Long March 6
- Long March 7
- Long March 8
- Long March 11
- PSLV
- Soyuz-2 (Russia)
- Soyuz-ST (Europe)
- Vega
- Others

==== By family ====
Family	Country	Launches	Successes	Failures	Partial failures	Remarks
Angara	Russia	1	1	0	0	
Antares	United States	2	2	0	0	
Ariane	France	3	3	0	0	
Astra	United States	2	0	2	0	Maiden flight
Atlas	United States	5	5	0	0	
Ceres	China	1	1	0	0	Maiden flight
Delta	United States	1	1	0	0	
Electron	United States	7	6	1	0	
Falcon	United States	25	25	0	0	
H-II	Japan	4	4	0	0	
Kuaizhou	China	4	2	2	0	
LauncherOne	United States	1	0	1	0	Maiden flight
Long March	China	34	32	2	0	
Minotaur	United States	1	1	0	0	
PSLV	India	2	2	0	0	
R-7	Russia	15	15	0	0	
Safir	Iran	1	1	0	0	
Shavit 2	Israel	1	1	0	0	
Simorgh	Iran	1	0	1	0	
Universal Rocket	Russia	1	1	0	0	
Vega	Italy	2	1	1	0	

==== By type ====
Rocket	Country	Family	Launches	Successes	Failures	Partial failures	Remarks
Angara A5	Russia	Angara	1	1	0	0	
Antares 200	United States	Antares	2	2	0	0	
Ariane 5	France	Ariane	3	3	0	0	
Atlas V	United States	Atlas	5	5	0	0	
Ceres-1	China	Ceres	1	1	0	0	Maiden flight
Delta IV	United States	Delta	1	1	0	0	
Electron	United States	Electron	7	6	1	0	
Falcon 9	United States	Falcon	25	25	0	0	
H-IIA	Japan	H-II	3	3	0	0	
H-IIB	Japan	H-II	1	1	0	0	Final flight
Kuaizhou	China	Kuaizhou	4	2	2	0	
LauncherOne	United States	LauncherOne	1	0	1	0	Maiden flight
Long March 2	China	Long March	11	11	0	0	
Long March 3	China	Long March	8	7	1	0	
Long March 4	China	Long March	6	6	0	0	
Long March 5	China	Long March	3	3	0	0	
Long March 6	China	Long March	1	1	0	0	
Long March 7	China	Long March	1	0	1	0	
Long March 8	China	Long March	1	1	0	0	Maiden flight
Long March 11	China	Long March	3	3	0	0	
Minotaur IV	United States	Minotaur	1	1	0	0	
PSLV	India	PSLV	2	2	0	0	
Proton	Russia	Universal Rocket	1	1	0	0	
Qased	Iran	Safir	1	1	0	0	Maiden flight
Rocket 3	United States	Astra	2	0	2	0	Maiden flight
Shavit 2	Israel	Shavit	1	1	0	0	
Simorgh	Iran	Simorgh	1	0	1	0	
Soyuz-2	Russia	R-7	15	15	0	0	
Vega	Italy	Vega	2	1	1	0	

==== By configuration ====
Rocket	Country	Type	Launches	Successes	Failures	Partial failures	Remarks
Angara A5 / Briz-M	Russia	Angara A5	1	1	0	0	
Antares 230+	United States	Antares	2	2	0	0	
Ariane 5 ECA	France	Ariane 5	3	3	0	0	
Atlas V 411	United States	Atlas V	1	1	0	0	Final flight
Atlas V 501	United States	Atlas V	1	1	0	0	
Atlas V 531	United States	Atlas V	1	1	0	0	
Atlas V 541	United States	Atlas V	1	1	0	0	
Atlas V 551	United States	Atlas V	1	1	0	0	
Delta IV Heavy	United States	Delta IV	1	1	0	0	
Ceres-1	China	Ceres-1	1	1	0	0	Maiden flight
Electron	United States	Electron	7	6	1	0	
Falcon 9 Block 5	United States	Falcon 9	25	25	0	0	
H-IIA 202	Japan	H-IIA	3	3	0	0	
H-IIB	Japan	H-IIB	1	1	0	0	Final flight
Kuaizhou 1A	China	Kuaizhou	3	2	1	0	
Kuaizhou 11	China	Kuaizhou	1	0	1	0	Maiden flight
LauncherOne	United States	LauncherOne	1	0	1	0	Maiden flight
Long March 2C	China	Long March 2	3	3	0	0	
Long March 2D	China	Long March 2	7	7	0	0	
Long March 2F/T	China	Long March 2	1	1	0	0	
Long March 3B/E	China	Long March 3	8	7	1	0	
Long March 4B	China	Long March 4	5	5	0	0	
Long March 4C	China	Long March 4	1	1	0	0	
Long March 5	China	Long March 5	2	2	0	0	
Long March 5B	China	Long March 5	1	1	0	0	Maiden flight
Long March 6	China	Long March 6	1	1	0	0	
Long March 7A	China	Long March 7	1	0	1	0	Maiden flight
Long March 8	China	Long March 8	1	1	0	0	Maiden flight
Long March 11	China	Long March 11	3	3	0	0	
Minotaur IV	United States	Minotaur IV	1	1	0	0	
Proton-M / Briz-M	Russia	Proton	1	1	0	0	
PSLV-XL	India	PSLV	1	1	0	0	
PSLV-DL	India	PSLV	1	1	0	0	
Qased	Iran	Qased	1	1	0	0	Maiden flight
Rocket 3	United States	Rocket 3	2	0	2	0	Maiden flight
Shavit 2	Israel	Shavit	1	1	0	0	
Simorgh	Iran	Simorgh	1	0	1	0	
Soyuz-2.1a	Russia	Soyuz-2	4	4	0	0	
Soyuz-2.1a / Fregat-M or ST-A	Russia	Soyuz-2	3	3	0	0	
Soyuz-2.1b / Fregat-M or ST-B	Russia	Soyuz-2	8	8	0	0	
Vega	Italy	Vega	2	1	1	0	

=== By spaceport ===
- Jiuquan
- Taiyuan
- Wenchang
- Xichang
- Yellow Sea
- Kourou
- Satish Dhawan
- Semnan
- Shahroud
- Palmachim
- Tanegashima
- Baikonur
- Mahia
- Plesetsk
- Vostochny
- Cape Canaveral
- Kennedy
- MARS
- Mojave
- PSCA
- Vandenberg

Site	Country	Launches	Successes	Failures	Partial failures	Remarks
Baikonur	Kazakhstan	7	7	0	0	
Cape Canaveral	United States	20	20	0	0	
Jiuquan	China	13	11	2	0	
Kennedy	United States	10	10	0	0	
Kourou	France	7	6	1	0	
Mahia	New Zealand	7	6	1	0	
MARS	United States	3	3	0	0	
Mojave	United States	1	0	1	0	
PSCA	United States	2	0	2	0	
Palmachim	Israel	1	1	0	0	
Plesetsk	Russia	7	7	0	0	
Satish Dhawan	India	2	2	0	0	
Shahroud	Iran	1	1	0	0	First orbital launch
Semnan	Iran	1	0	1	0	
Taiyuan	China	7	7	0	0	
Tanegashima	Japan	4	4	0	0	
Vandenberg	United States	1	1	0	0	
Vostochny	Russia	1	1	0	0	
Wenchang	China	5	4	1	0	
Xichang	China	13	12	1	0	
Yellow Sea	China	1	1	0	0	
Total		114	104	10	0	

=== By orbit ===
- Low Earth
- Low Earth (ISS)
- Low Earth (SSO)
- Low Earth (retrograde)
- Medium Earth
- Molniya
- Geosychronous
- Lunar transfer
- Heliocentric

Orbital regime	Launches	Achieved	Not achieved	Accidentally achieved	Remarks
Transatmospheric	0	0	0	0	
Low Earth / Sun-synchronous	82	74	8	0	Including flights to the ISS
Geosynchronous / GTO	19	17	2	0	
Medium Earth / Molniya	8	8	0	0	
High Earth / Lunar transfer	1	1	0	0	
Heliocentric orbit / Planetary transfer	4	4	0	0	
Total	114	104	10	0	

== Suborbital launch statistics ==
=== By country ===
For the purposes of this section, the yearly tally of suborbital launches by country assigns each flight to the country of origin of the rocket, not to the launch services provider or the spaceport. Flights intended to fly below 80 km (50 mi) are omitted.

Country	Launches	Successes	Failures	Partial failures
Canada	3	3	0	0
France	1	1	0	0
India	2	2	0	0
Israel	1	1	0	0
Japan	2	1	1	0
Netherlands	2 (Note: Includes T-Minus Dart launches from Australia.)	2	0	0
Russia	8	8	0	0
Turkey	1	1	0	0
United States	11	11	0	0
World	31	30	1	0

== First successful orbital launch ==
- Ceres-1
- Long March 5B
- Long March 8
- Qased

== See also ==
- Timeline of Solar System exploration#2020s
- 2020 SO, a near-Earth object orbiting Earth and Sun that was confirmed to be a remnant of 1966 in spaceflight in December
