= USA-298 =

United States Space Force military communications satellite constellation

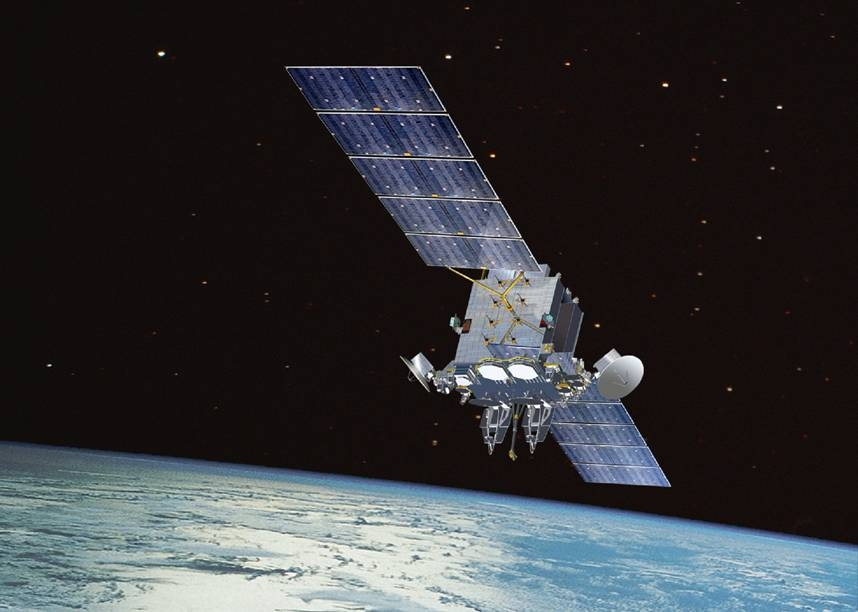
- Artist's impression of an AEHF-6 satellite
- Names: AEHF-6; Advanced Extremely High Frequency-6
- Mission type: Military communications
- Operator: United States Space Force
- COSPAR ID: 2020-022B
- SATCAT no.: 45465
- Website: https://www.spaceforce.mil/
- Mission duration: 14 years (planned); 5 years, 10 months and 3 days (in progress)

Spacecraft properties
- Spacecraft: AEHF-5
- Bus: A2100M
- Manufacturer: Lockheed Martin Space
- Launch mass: 6,168 kg (13,598 lb)

Start of mission
- Launch date: 26 March 2020, 20:18:00 UTC
- Rocket: Atlas V 551 (AV-086)
- Launch site: Cape Canaveral, SLC-41
- Contractor: United Launch Alliance

Orbital parameters
- Reference system: Geocentric orbit
- Regime: Geosynchronous orbit

USA-298, also known as Advanced Extremely High Frequency 6 or AEHF-6, is a military communications satellite operated by the United States Space Force (USSF). It is the sixth of six satellite to be launched as part of the Advanced Extremely High Frequency program, which replaced the earlier Milstar system.

== Satellite description ==
The USA-298 satellite was constructed by Lockheed Martin Space, and is based on the A2100 satellite bus. The satellite has a mass of 6,168 kg (13,598 lb) and a design life of 14 years. It will be used to provide super high frequency (SHF) and extremely high frequency (EHF) communications for the United States Armed Forces, as well as those of the United Kingdom, the Netherlands, Canada, and Australia.

== Launch ==
USA-298 was launched by United Launch Alliance, aboard an Atlas V 551 flying from SLC-41 at the Cape Canaveral Air Force Station (CCAFS). The launch occurred at 20:18:00 UTC on 26 March 2020, placing the satellite into a geostationary transfer orbit (GTO) with a perigee of 12,543 km (7,794 mi), an apogee of 30,672 km (19,059 mi), and 9.95° inclination. The satellite was successfully deployed in this orbit about five and a half hours after launch.

== TDO-2 satellite ==
Alongside AEHF-6, the U.S. Air Force Space and Missile Systems Center launched an experimental 12U cubesat known as TDO-2 (Technology Demonstration Orbiter). The satellite was deployed, after 30 minutes in the flight, prior to AEHF-6, from a dispenser on the aft of the Centaur upper stage into an orbit with a perigee of 200 km (120 mi) and an apogee of 35,459 km (22,033 mi).

== See also ==
- 2020 in spaceflight
