= Ekspress-80 =

Russian communications satellite

- Names: Экспресс-80; Express-80
- Mission type: Communications
- Operator: RSCC Space Communications (RSCC)
- COSPAR ID: 2020-053B
- SATCAT no.: 45986
- Website: eng.rscc.ru
- Mission duration: 15 years (planned); 5 years, 8 months and 14 days (in progress)

Spacecraft properties
- Spacecraft: Ekspress-80
- Spacecraft type: Ekspress
- Bus: Ekspress-1000H
- Manufacturer: ISS Reshetnev (bus); Thales Alenia Space (payload)
- Launch mass: 1,947 kg (4,292 lb)
- Dry mass: 471 kg (1,038 lb)
- Power: 6.300 kW

Start of mission
- Launch date: 30 July 2020, 21:25:19 UTC
- Rocket: Proton-M / Briz-M
- Launch site: Baikonur, Site 200/39
- Contractor: Khrunichev State Research and Production Space Center
- Entered service: 15 Mars 2021

Orbital parameters
- Reference system: Geocentric orbit
- Regime: Geostationary orbit
- Longitude: 80° East (2020–present)

Transponders
- Band: 38 transponders: 16 C-band; 20 Ku-band; 2 L-band
- Coverage area: Russia, CIS

Ekspress-80 (Russian: Экспресс-80 meaning Express-80) is a Russian communications satellite which was launched in 2020. Part of the Ekspress series of geostationary communications satellites, it is owned and operated by the RSCC Space Communications.

== Satellite description ==
Thales Alenia Space, constructed Ekspress-80 payload, and ISS Reshetnev constructed the satellite bus which was based on the Ekspress-1000N. The satellite has a mass of 1,947 kg (4,292 lb), provides 6.3 kilowatts to its payload, and a planned operational lifespan of 15 years. The satellite carried 38 transponders: 16 operating in the C-band of the electromagnetic spectrum, 20 in the Ku-band and 2 in the L-band.

== Mission ==
The satellite is designed to provide TV and radio broadcasting services, data transmission, multimedia services, telephony, and mobile communications.

== Launch ==
Ekspress-80 was originally to be launched in 2018, but was delayed to 2020. It used a Proton-M / Briz-M launch vehicle to be placed in a supersynchronous geostationary transfer orbit (16,593 km x 54,812 km x 0.62°), as was Ekspress-103 (16,581 km x 5,4811 km x 0.64°).

== Mission ==
Roscosmos announced on 9 September 2020, that the Ekspress-80 satellite was damaged during its transfer to geostationary orbit, probably by space debris. However, the continuation of the transfer operations was not threatened. The satellite entered in service at orbital position 80° East on 15 March 2021.

== See also ==
- 2020 in spaceflight
