= Pujiang-1 =

Chinese technology demonstration satellite

- Mission type: Technology Experiment
- Operator: SAST
- COSPAR ID: 2015-051A
- SATCAT no.: 40925

Spacecraft properties
- Spacecraft: PJ-1
- Manufacturer: China

Start of mission
- Launch date: 25 September 2015, 01:41 (UTC)
- Rocket: Chang Zheng 11
- Launch site: JSLC

Orbital parameters
- Reference system: Geocentric
- Regime: Sun-synchronous (SSO)
- Semi-major axis: 6855 km
- Perigee altitude: 474.9 km
- Apogee altitude: 493.6 km
- Inclination: 97.3 degrees
- Period: 94.1 minutes

Pujiang-1, also known as PJ-1, is a Chinese technology demonstration satellite designed to promote the construction of smart cities in China. PJ-1 also monitors weather, traffic and population density of a city. It is the first Chinese satellite that uses 3D printing for the titanium structure of its antenna. It also features a Wi-Fi router providing a communication network between satellites.

== Launch ==
PJ-1 was launched on 25 September 2015 at 1:41 UTC from the Jiuquan Satellite Launch Center (JSLC) in China.

== Orbit ==
The Chang Zheng 11 (Long March 11) carrier rocket delivered PJ-1 satellite into a Sun-synchronous orbit (SSO) at an altitude of about 299 miles (481 km), inclined 97.3 degrees.
