= Center for Telematics =

German research institute on Telematics applications

Zentrum Für Telematik e.V. (ZFT)
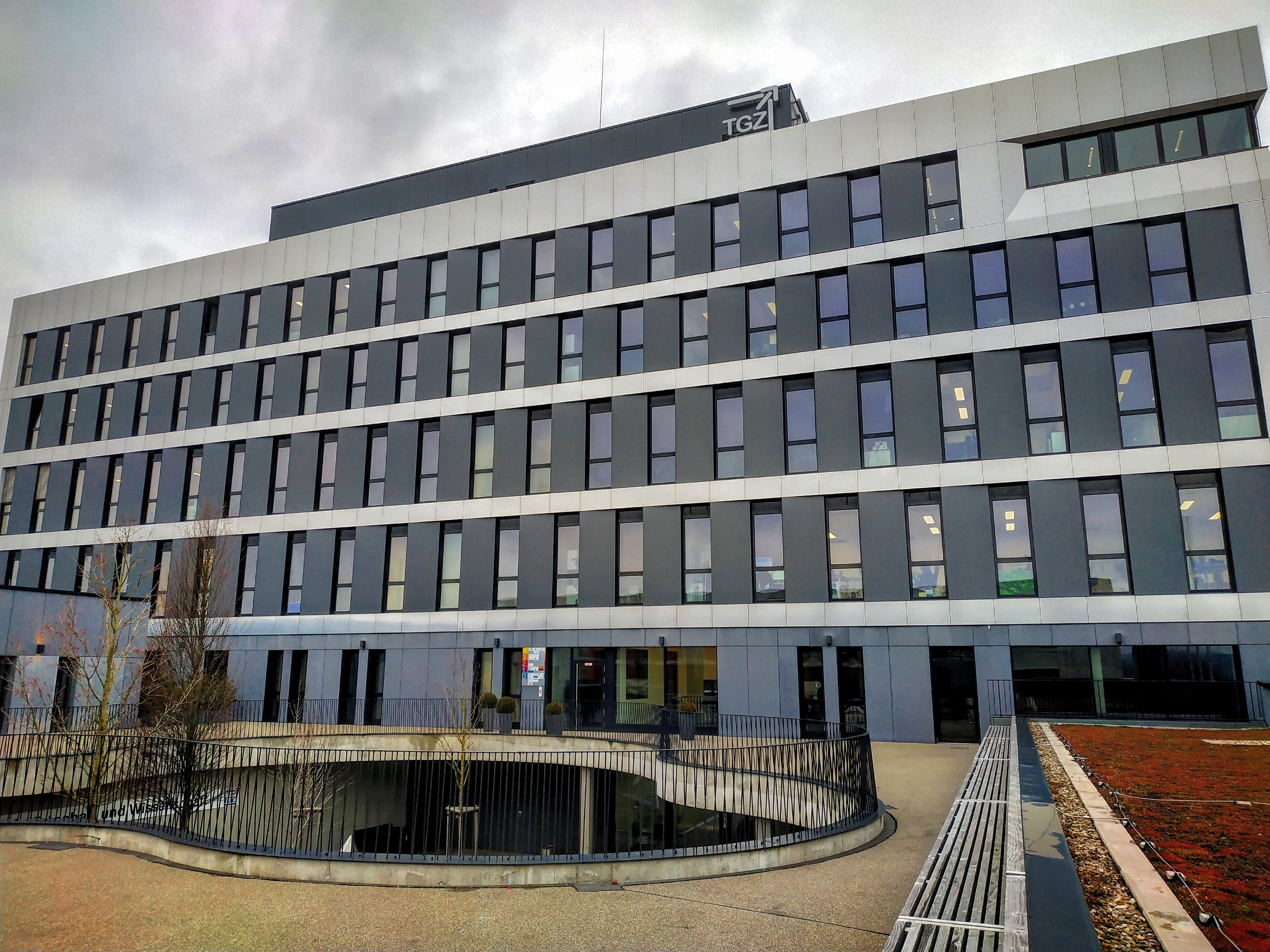
- ZFT's headquarters in Würzburg, Germany
- Industry: Automation, Robotics, Small satellites, Telematics, Telemedicine
- Founded: 2005
- Headquarters: Magdalene-Schoch-Str. 5 97074 Würzburg, Germany
- Website: telematik-zentrum.de

The Center for Telematics (commonly known as ZFT by its acronym in German) is a German research institute located in the City of Würzburg in northern Bavaria; although its main research topic is on robotics and telematics, it is also among the leading institutes in Bavaria designing and building small satellites (cubesats) focusing in formation flying. In 2018, a German-Israeli research team led by the Center for Telematics received a research prize from the European Research Council to build ten micro-satellites for exploring the clouds and improve global climate models. The Center for Telematics has also collaborated closely with the University of Würzburg on the development of the OBC (On-Board Computer), as well as the attitude determination sensor suite and control system of the UWE-3 and UWE-4 CubeSat, the latter launched on 27 December 2018 as a secondary payload on a Soyuz-2.

Model of 1U CubeSat developed at ZFT ready for the dynamical loads test campaign

== Research area ==
ZFT does research on Telematics, the interdisciplinary integration of telecommunications, automation and information technology (commonly known as IT), which deals with techniques to provide services in remote locations. On this basis, applications can be realized in areas as diverse as industrial remote maintenance, remote control of robots, medicine, aerospace, transport, teleoperations of pico-satellites and remote education; telematics applications in the near future will change the way people do their job and even will change the driving experience.

Given the importance of analyzing different processes that enable on-site technicians and expert personnel concentrated in service centers to work together even if they are located on different continents. The Center for Telematics informs about opportunities for the use of telematics technologies, supporting the development of products, services, and applications for industry and academia. Then, the center works analyzing potential solutions for the support of processes in the industrial remote maintenance not only in the automotive industry but also in space applications. Due to this, in 2018 ZFT was selected as the winner on the German Telematics Award in the category "Networked Production" for its software Adaptive Management and Security System in the field of advanced automation technology

== Telematics in space applications: Space Factory ==
The center for telematics also works in conjunction with the German Aerospace Center (German: Deutsches Zentrum für Luft- und Raumfahrt e.V. abbreviated DLR) on small satellites projects such as Space Factory 4.0, consisting on developing a robotic assembly of highly modular satellites on an in-orbit platform based on Industrie 4.0 processes. Technical University of Darmstadt, the Technical University of Munich and the ZFT are involved in Space Factory 4.0. The objectives of Space Factory 4.0 are to study processes for the rapid production of small satellites on an in-orbit platform, and to analyze and explore the necessary support and ground infrastructure, taking into account Industry 4.0 and Space Guidance (ECSS) standards.

== Infrastructure on site ==
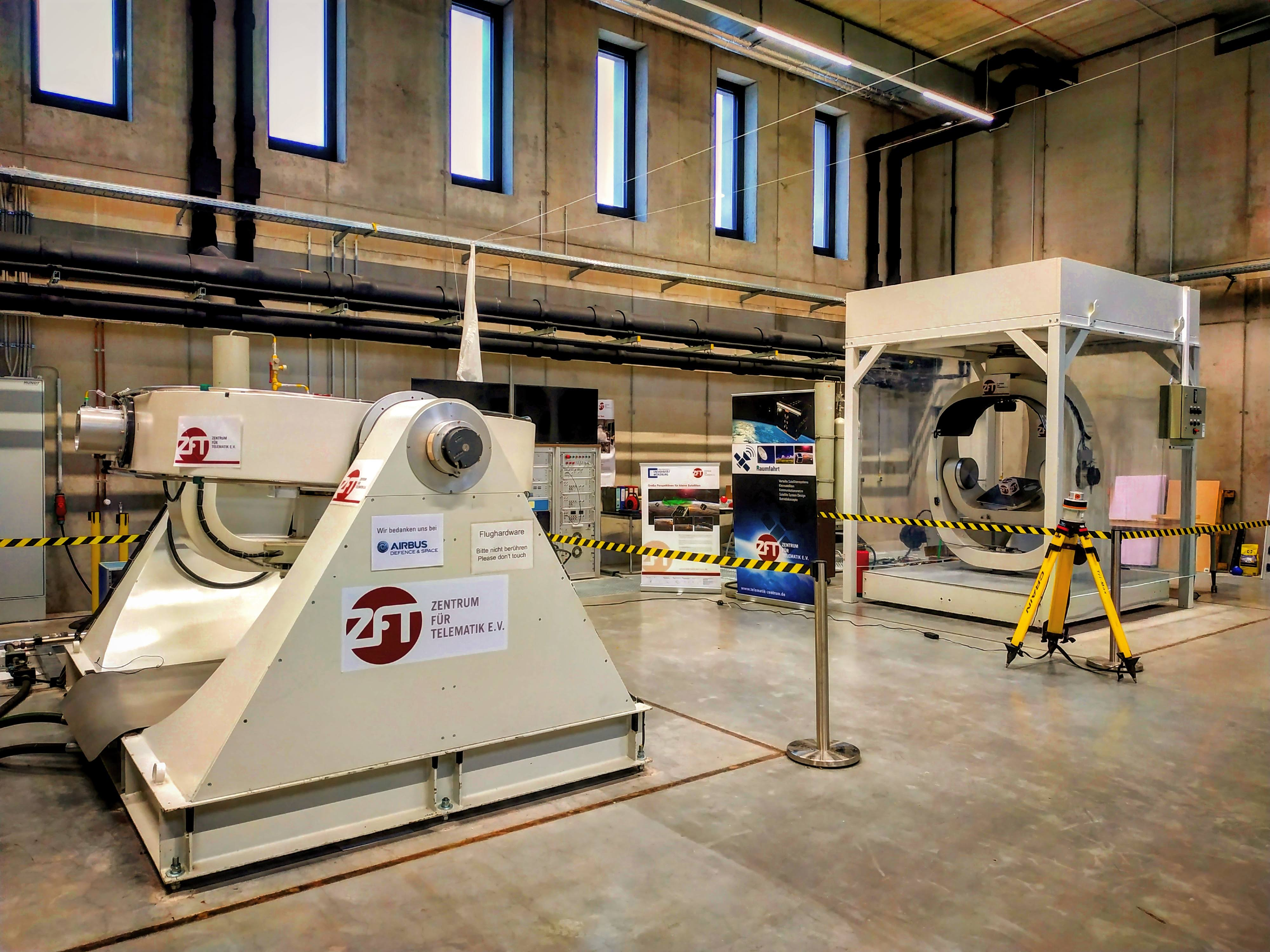
3D motion simulators for attitude determination and control

For applied research and performance testing, in cooperation with the academia, there is an infrastructure consisting of a 3-meter satellite tracking antenna, the robot hall, the connected field-testing ground, a high precision positioning measurement environment, industrial robotic arms, numerous mobile robots, highly accurate powerful motion simulators and a control console for remote control and remote maintenance tasks. So the center is also the ground station of the experimental satellites of the University of Würzburg.
