= Progress MS-15 =

2020 Russian resupply spaceflight to the ISS

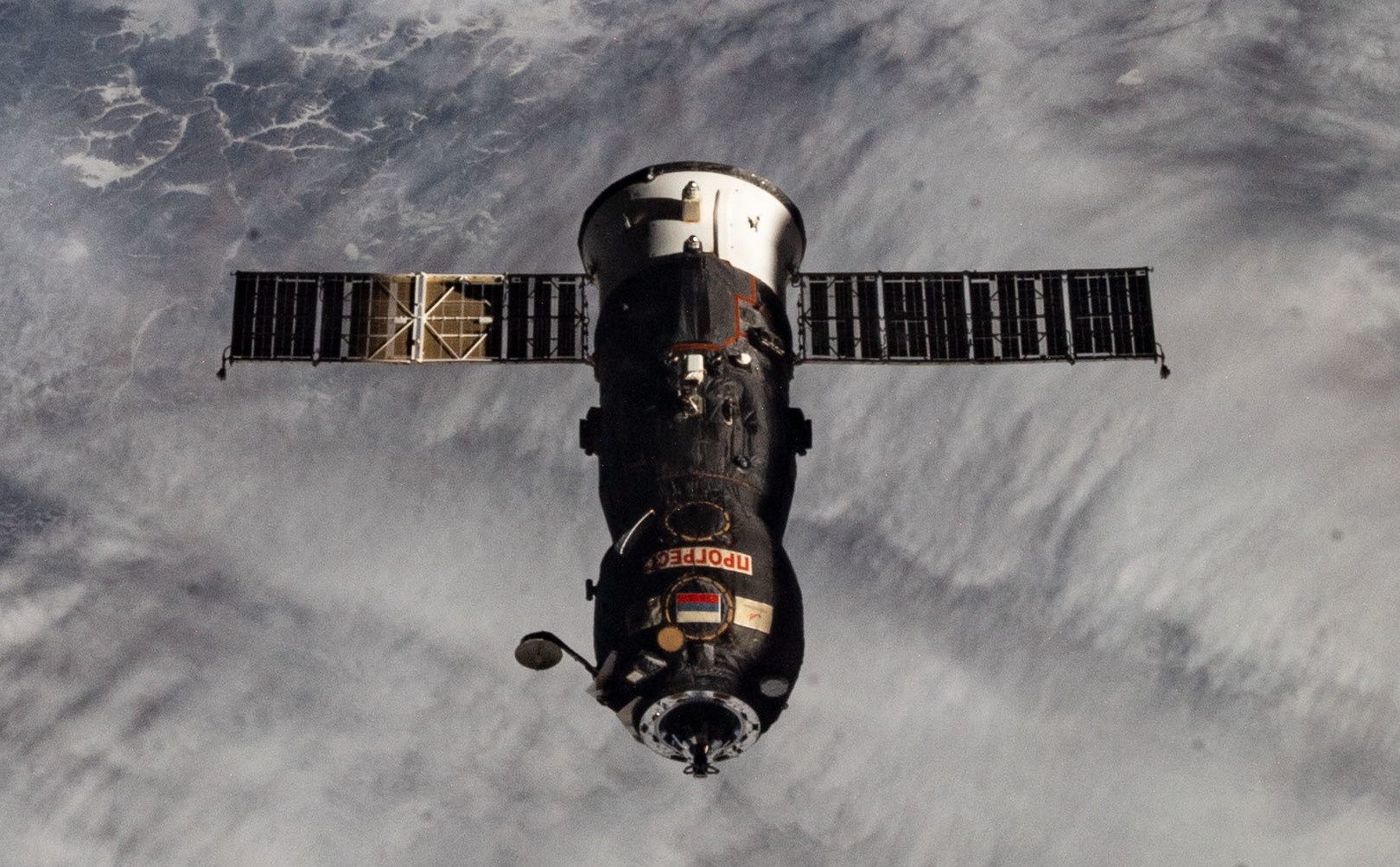
- Progress MS-15 after undocking from the ISS
- Names: Progress 76P
- Mission type: ISS resupply
- Operator: Roscosmos
- COSPAR ID: 2020-050A
- SATCAT no.: 45937
- Mission duration: 200 days, 18 hours, 46 minutes

Spacecraft properties
- Spacecraft: Progress MS-15
- Spacecraft type: Progress MS
- Manufacturer: Energia
- Launch mass: 7000 kg
- Payload mass: 2540 kg

Start of mission
- Launch date: 23 July 2020, 14:26:21 UTC
- Rocket: Soyuz-2.1a
- Launch site: Baikonur, Site 31/6
- Contractor: RKTs Progress

End of mission
- Disposal: Deorbited
- Decay date: 9 February 2021, 09:13 UTC

Orbital parameters
- Reference system: Geocentric orbit
- Regime: Low Earth orbit
- Inclination: 51.65°

Docking with ISS
- Docking port: Pirs nadir
- Docking date: 23 July 2020, 17:45 UTC
- Undocking date: 9 February 2021, 05:21 UTC
- Time docked: 200 days, 11 hours, 36 minutes

Cargo
- Mass: 2540 kg
- Pressurised: 2540 kg
- Fuel: 620 kg
- Gaseous: 46 kg (oxygen)
- Water: 420 kg

Progress MS-15 (Russian: Прогресс МC-15), Russian production No. 444, identified by NASA as Progress 76P, was a Progress spaceflight operated by Roscosmos to resupply the International Space Station (ISS). This was the 167th flight of a Progress spacecraft.

== History ==
The Progress-MS is an uncrewed freighter based on the Progress-M featuring improved avionics. This improved variant first launched on 21 December 2015. It has the following improvements:

- New external compartment that enables it to deploy satellites. Each compartment can hold up to four launch containers. First time installed on Progress MS-03.
- Enhanced redundancy thanks to the addition of a backup system of electrical motors for the docking and sealing mechanism.
- Improved Micrometeoroid (MMOD) protection with additional panels in the cargo compartment.
- Luch Russian relay satellites link capabilities enable telemetry and control even when not in direct view of ground radio stations.
- GNSS autonomous navigation enables real time determination of the status vector and orbital parameters dispensing with the need of ground station orbit determination.
- Real time relative navigation thanks to direct radio data exchange capabilities with the space station.
- New digital radio that enables enhanced TV camera view for the docking operations.
- The Ukrainian Chezara Kvant-V on board radio system and antenna/feeder system has been replaced with a Unified Command Telemetry System (UCTS).
- Replacement of the Kurs A with Kurs NA digital system.

== Launch ==
A Soyuz-2.1a launch vehicle was used to launch Progress MS-15 to the International Space Station. Progress MS-15 was launched at 14:26:21 UTC from Baikonur Cosmodrome Site 31 on a fast-track trajectory. Following a nominal launch, Progress MS-15 docked with the Pirs port on the ISS two orbits later at 17:45:00 UTC.

== Docking ==
Around 3 hours 20 minutes after the launch, Progress MS-15 successfully docked automatically at the nadir port of the Pirs module at 17:45:00 UTC, where it remained until February 2021. After its mission was completed, Progress MS-15 departed and re-entered the Earth's atmosphere for destruction over the South Pacific Ocean.

== Cargo ==
The Progress MS-15 spacecraft delivered 2,540 kg (5,600 lb) of cargo, with 1,430 kg (3,150 lb) of this being dry cargo. The following is a breakdown of cargo bound for the ISS:

- Dry cargo: 1,430 kg (3,150 lb)
- Fuel: 620 kg (1,370 lb)
- Oxygen: 46 kg (101 lb)
- Water: 420 kg (930 lb)

== Undocking and decay ==
The Progress MS-15 remained docked at the station through on 9 February 2021, when it departed with trash and re-entered the Earth's atmosphere for destruction over the South Pacific Ocean. The Pirs module, originally scheduled to be removed and discarded at the end of this mission, will stay attached to the station until the arrival of the Nauka module.

== See also ==
- Uncrewed spaceflights to the International Space Station
