= Long March 11 =

Small orbital launch vehicle

- Function: Small-lift launch vehicle
- Manufacturer: CALT
- Country of origin: China

Size
- Height: 20.8 m (68 ft)
- Diameter: 2.0 m (6.6 ft)
- Mass: 58,000 kg (128,000 lb)
- Stages: 4

Capacity

Payload to LEO
- Mass: 500 kg (1,100 lb)

Payload to SSO
- Altitude: 700 km
- Mass: 350 kg (770 lb)

Associated rockets
- Family: Long March
- Comparable: Minotaur I, Pegasus, Start-1

Launch history
- Status: Active
- Launch sites: Jiuquan; Xichang; Special converted barge, Yellow Sea
- Total launches: 18
- Success(es): 18
- First flight: 25 September 2015
- Last flight: 8 November 2025 (most recent)

First stage – P35
- Powered by: 1 Solid
- Maximum thrust: 1,200 kilonewtons (270,000 lb_{f})
- Burn time: 71 seconds

Second stage – Solid
- Powered by: 1 Solid

Third stage – Solid
- Powered by: 1 Solid

Fourth stage – Solid
- Powered by: 1 Solid

The Long March 11 (Chinese: 长征十一号运载火箭), or Chang Zheng 11 as in pinyin, abbreviated LM-11 for export or CZ-11 within China (and designated 11H when launched from sea), is a Chinese four stage solid-propellant carrier rocket of the Long March family, which is developed by the China Aerospace Science and Technology Corporation. It was designed as a "quick reaction" rocket with the ability to launch on short notice, from road vehicles (CZ-11) and ships (CZ-11H).

Based on a number of design similarities, it is believed the rocket was developed from the DF-31 ICBM, by adding an additional solid propelant 4th stage to the 3 stage missile. This is what gives it its quick launch capabilities, as it can be stored for a longer time than liquid-fueled rockets, and then quickly cold launched from a launch tube, from a sea barge or road mobile vehicle.

The maiden flight of the Long March 11 occurred on 25 September 2015. The first sea launch occurred on 5 June 2019, from a converted barge stationed in the Yellow Sea. Eighteen launches have been made as of December 2025, six of them from sea.

== Launch Statistics ==
- Failure
- Partial failure
- Success
- Planned

== List of launches ==
Flight number	Serial number	Date (UTC)	Launch site	Payload	Orbit	Outcome
1	Y1	25 September 2015; 01:41	JSLC	Pujiang-1; Tianwang 1A; Tianwang 1B; Tianwang 1C	SSO	Success
2	Y2	9 November 2016; 23:42	JSLC	XPNAV 1 Xiaoxiang 1	SSO	Success
3	Y3	19 January 2018; 04:12	JSLC	Jilin-1 07; Jilin-1 08; 4 cubesats	SSO	Success
4	Y4	26 April 2018; 04:42	JSLC	Zhuhai-1 OVS-1; Zhuhai-1 OHS-1/2/3/4	SSO	Success
5	Y5	21 December 2018; 23:51	JSLC	Hongyun-1	SSO	Success
6	Y6	21 January 2019; 05:42	JSLC	Jilin-1 Spectral 01/02; Lingque-1A; Xiaoxiang-1-03	SSO	Success
7	HY1	5 June 2019; 04:06	Special converted barge (Tai Rui); Yellow Sea (34.90° N, 121.19° E)	Bufeng-1A; Bufeng-1B; Jilin-1 High Resolution 03A; Xiaoxiang-1-04; Tianqi-3; Tianxiang-1A; Tianxiang-1B	LEO	Success
8	Y7	19 September 2019; 06:42	JSLC	Zhuhai-1 OVS-3; Zhuhai-1 OHS-3A/B/C/D	SSO	Success
9	Y8	29 May 2020; 20:13	XSLC	XJS G (Earth observation technology); XJS H (Earth observation technology)	LEO	Success
10	HY2	15 September 2020; 01:23	Special converted barge (De Bo 3); Yellow Sea (34.31° N, 123.76° E)	Jilin-1 Gaofen-03B 01/02/03/04/05/06; Jilin-1 Gaofen-03C 01/02/03	SSO	Success
11	Y9	9 December 2020; 20:14	XSLC	GECAM A GECAM B	LEO	Success
12	Y10	30 March 2022; 02:29	JSLC	Tianping-2A; Tianping-2B; Tianping-2C	LEO	Success
13	HY3	30 April 2022; 03:30	Special converted barge (Tai Rui); East China Sea (32.18° N, 123.79° E)	Jilin-1 Gaofen-03D 04/05/06/07; Jilin-1 Gaofen-04A	SSO	Success
14	HY4	7 October 2022; 13:10	Special converted barge (DeFu 15002); Offshore waters of Haiyang Port (36.23° N, 121.20° E)	Centispace 1-S5/S6	LEO	Success
15	Y12	16 December 2022; 06:17	XSLC	Shiyan 21	LEO	Success
16	Y11	15 March 2023; 11:41	JSLC	Shiyan 19	SSO	Success
17	HY5	25 December 2023; 22:39	Special converted barge (Bo Run Jiu Zhou); South China Sea	Shiyan 24C-01; Shiyan 24C-02; Shiyan 24C-03	SSO	Success
18	HY6	8 November 2025; 21:01	Special converted barge (Dong Fang Hang Tian Gang); Offshore waters of Haiyang Port	Shiyan 32-01; Shiyan 32-02; Shiyan 32-03	LEO	Success
