= Gravitational Wave High-energy Electromagnetic Counterpart All-sky Monitor =

Space observatory

Gravitational Wave High-energy Electromagnetic Counterpart All-sky Monitor (GECAM) (Chinese: 引力波暴高能电磁对应体全天监测器) is a space observatory composed of a constellation of two X-ray and gamma-ray all-sky observing small satellites, called GECAM A (a.k.a. KX 08A or Xiaoji, COSPAR ID 2020-094A, SATCAT no. 47234) and GECAM B (a.k.a. KX 08B or Xiaomu, COSPAR ID 2020-094B, SATCAT no. 47235), for research in electromagnetic counterparts of gravitational waves (GWs). It was launched on 9 December 2020 from the Xichang Satellite Launch Center at 20:14 UTC by a Long March 11 rocket. GECAM will focus on detecting electromagnetic counterparts of gravitational waves. In addition to signals from GWs, the observatory studies Ultra-long GRBs, X-ray Flashes, X-ray-rich GRBs, Magnetars and Terrestrial Gamma-ray Flashes.
