= History of the Chinese space program =

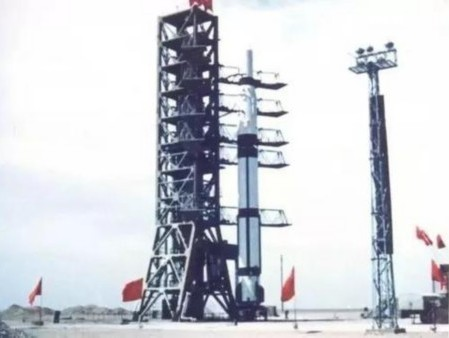
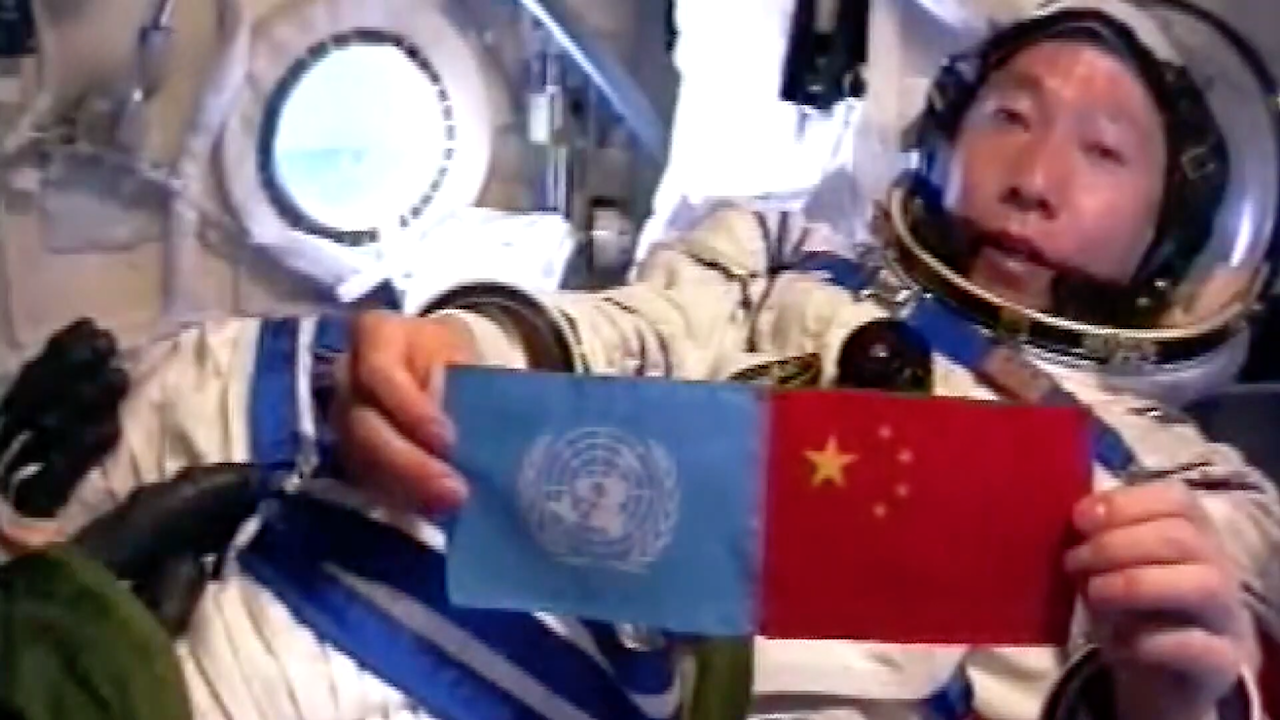
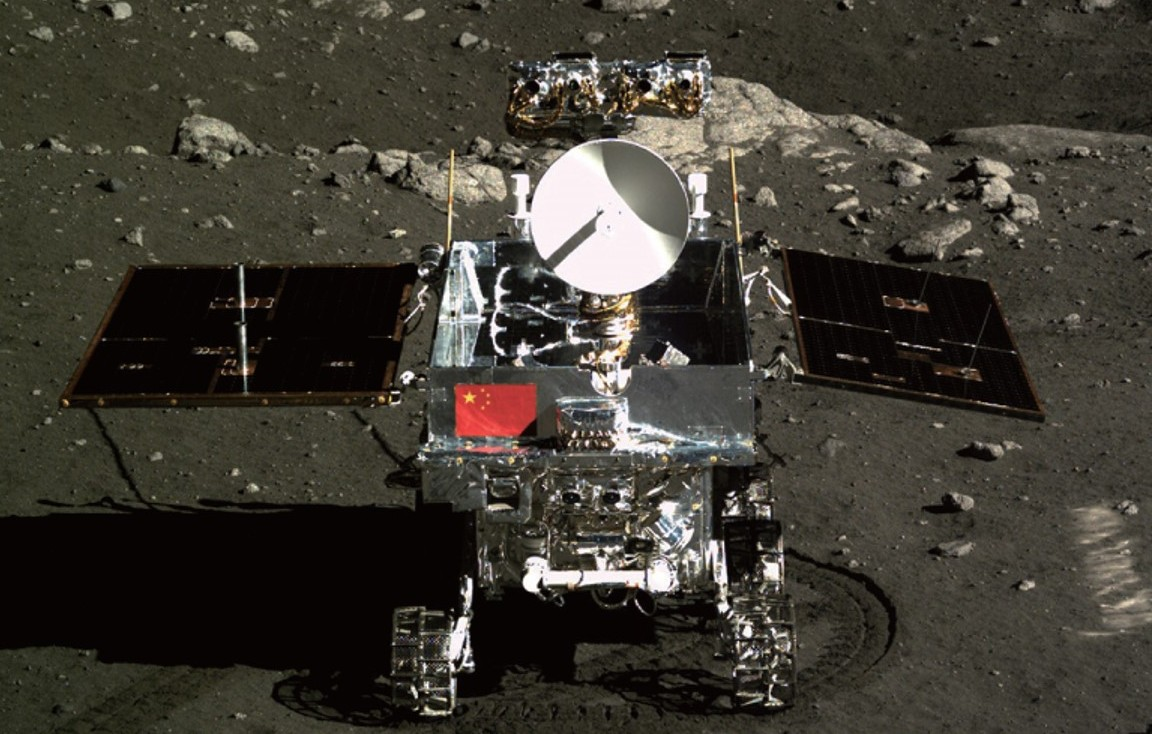
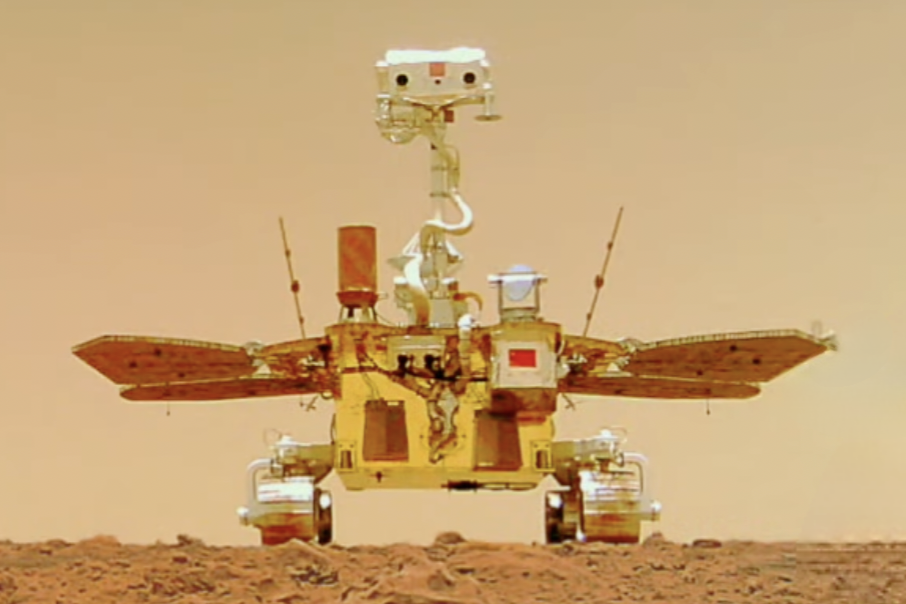
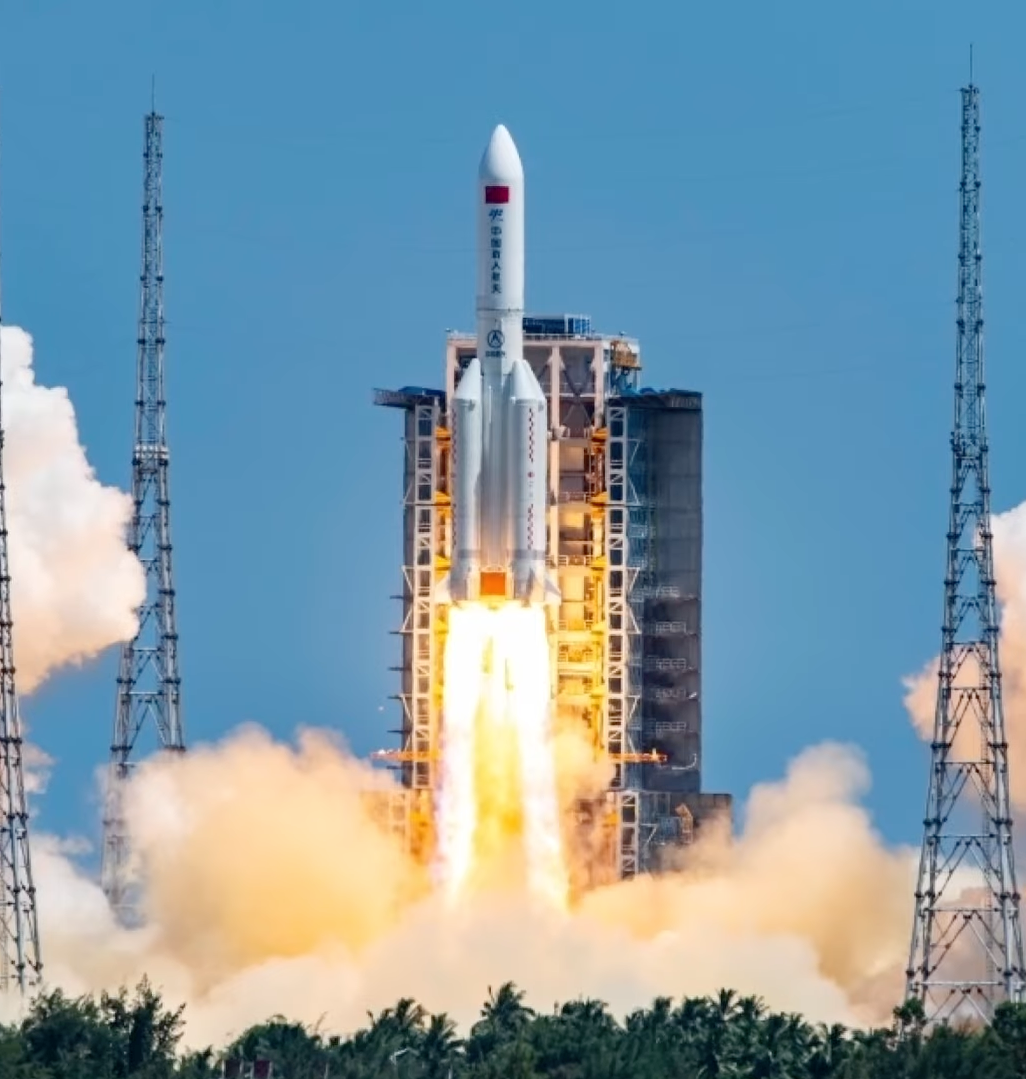
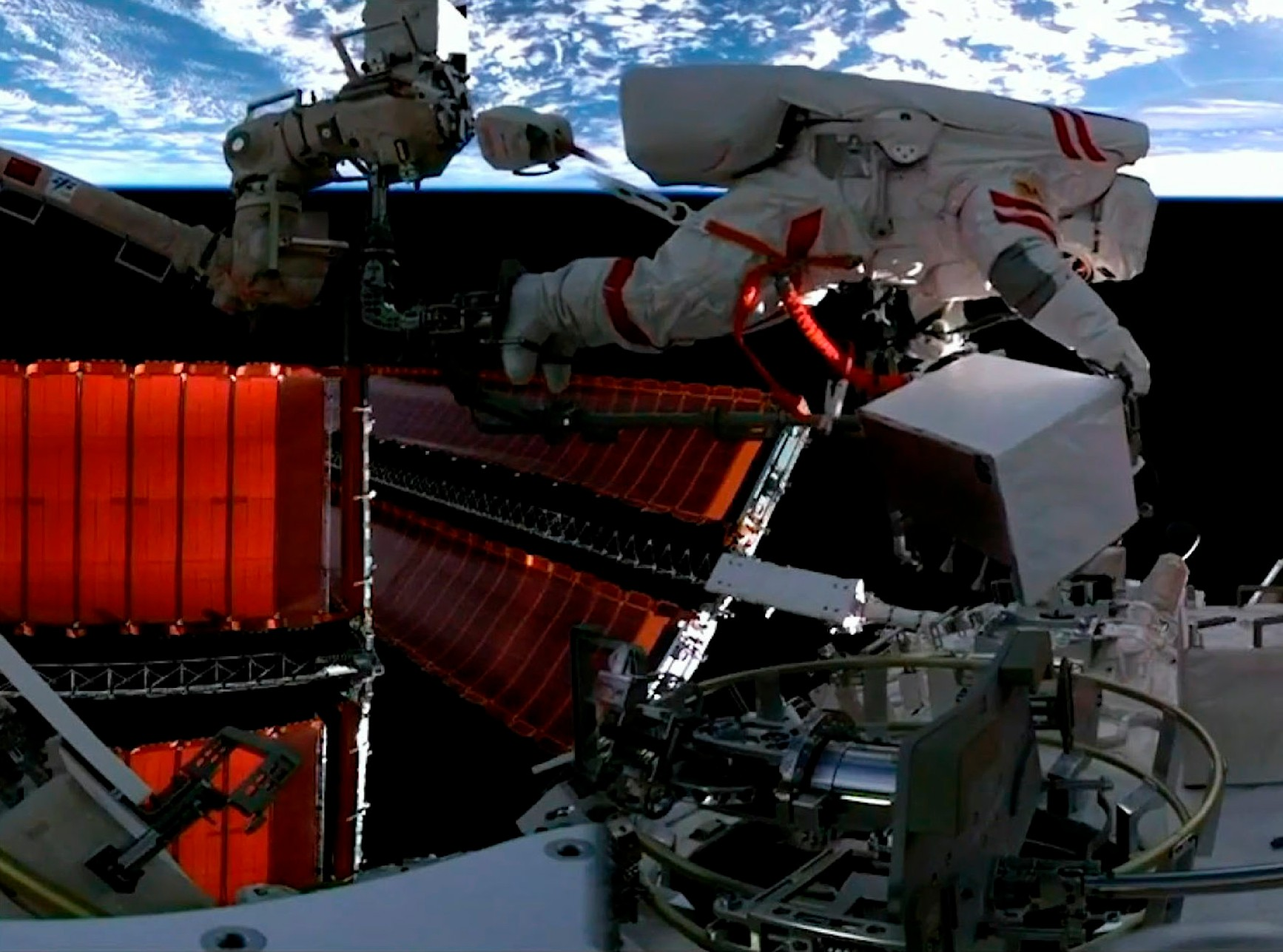
From left to right, top to bottom: Long March 1 prior to Dong Fang Hong 1 launch, 1970; Yang Liwei aboard Shenzhou 5, 2005; Yutu lunar rover, 2013; Zhurong rover on Mars, 2020; Long March 5B launching from the newest Wenchang Space Launch Site, Fei Junlong conducting a spacewalk from the Tiangong space station

The Chinese space program today conducts the most or second most orbital launches each year; China is one of three countries with a human spaceflight capability. (Note: Alongside the United States and Russia) Since the 2020s, the program has been contrasted against Western space programs as the "New Space Race".

From the 1950s, aided by the Soviet Union, development began on China's nuclear weapons, Dongfeng ballistic missiles, and Long March rockets, honored as the Two Bombs, One Satellite projects. Despite setbacks from the Cultural Revolution and Sino-Soviet split, China became the fifth country to independently launch a satellite, Dong Fang Hong 1 in 1970. China developed the Shenzhou crewed craft from Russia's Soyuz after a 1995 treaty; Shenzhou 5 carried the first Chinese astronaut in 2003. China commercially launched Western satellites from 1988, but failures, especially Intelsat 708, caused the US to embargo satellite export in 1998. After the US vetoed its joining the ISS, China began the Tiangong program, operating prototypes Tiangong-1 and -2 before the current Tiangong, the world's third modular space station. (Note: After ISS and the Soviet/Russian 1986–2001 Mir.)

China's Moon missions achieved the world's first far side landing (Chang'e 4), far side sample return (Chang'e 6), and longest-lived rover (Yutu-2). China's interplanetary missions deployed Tianwen-1, a Mars orbiter, lander, and the rover Zhurong; Tianwen-2 visited an asteroid in 2026 and will visit a comet in 2035. Its satellite constellations include BeiDou Navigation, Gaofen Observation, and the Guowang and Qianfan internet constellations. Long March 5 is the most powerful rocket operating outside of the US, and first Long March to not use hypergolic propellant.

Since 2019, China's private and state enterprises have made over a hundred launches with new rocket designs, such as the Kuaizhou family and Ceres-1. China is developing reusable spacecraft, including the Long March 10 rocket family and a military spaceplane. China plans a crewed lunar landing by 2030, using the planned Mengzhou craft, Lanyue lander, and Long March 10 rocket. China previously cooperated with the European Space Agency on deep space tracking and space science.

== Early years (1950s to mid-1970s) ==
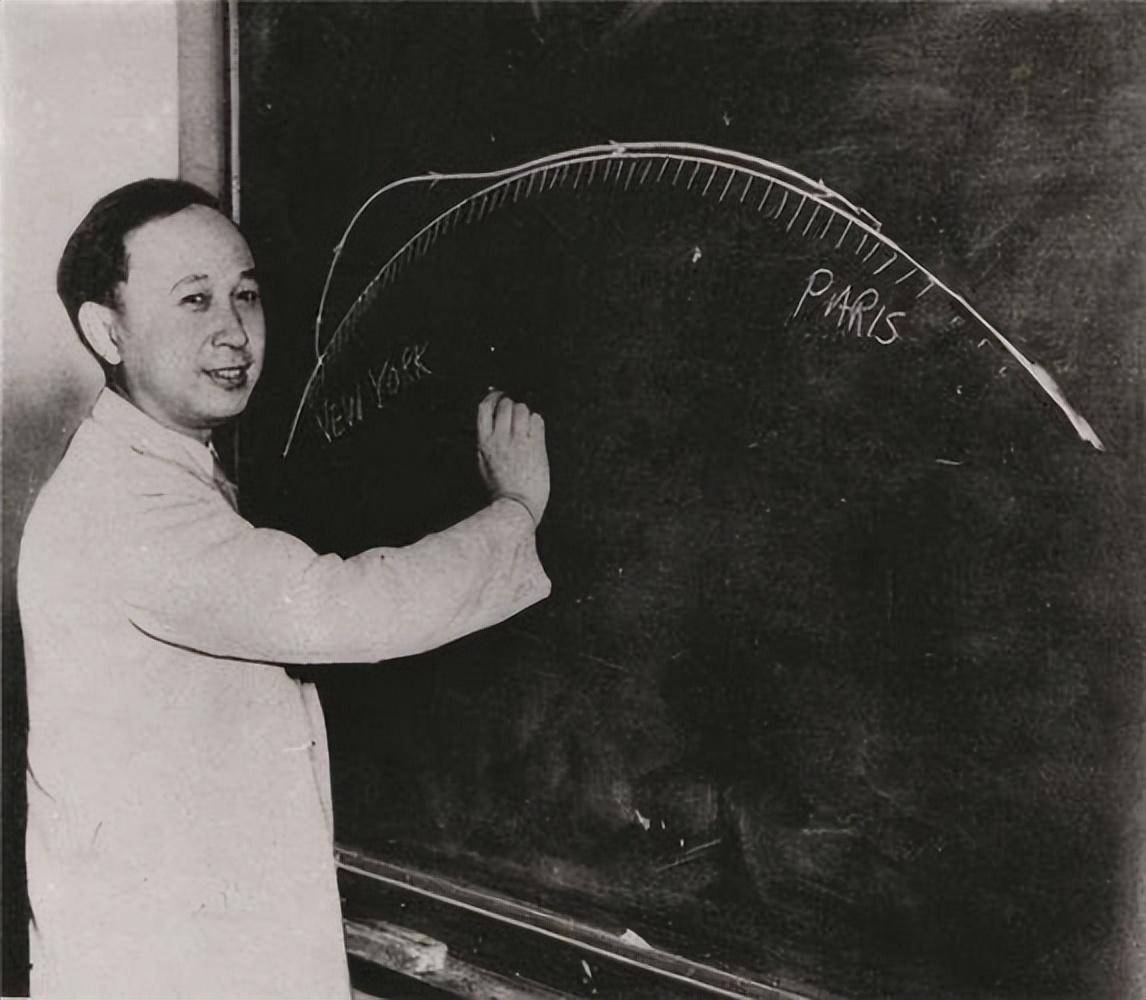
Qian Xuesen, a pioneering Chinese rocket scientist, describing a boost-glide trajectory.

The Chinese space program began in the form of missile research in the 1950s. After its birth in 1949, the newly founded People's Republic of China was in pursuit of missile technology to build up the nation's defense for the Cold War. In 1955, Qian Xuesen (钱学森), the world-class rocketry scientist, returned to China from the United States. In 1956, Qian submitted a proposal for the development of China's missile program, which was approved in just a few months. On October 8, China's first missile research institute, the Fifth Research Academy under the Ministry of National Defense, was established with less than 200 staff, most of which were recruited by Qian. The event was later recognized as the birth of China's space program.

To fully utilize all available resources, China kick-started its missile development by manufacturing a licensed copy of two Soviet R-2 missiles, which were secretly shipped to China in December 1957 as part of the cooperative technology transfer program between the Soviet Union and China. The Chinese version of the missile was given the code name "1059" with the expectation of being launched in 1959. But the target date was soon postponed due to various difficulties arising from the sudden withdrawal of Soviet technical assistance due to the Sino-Soviet split. Meanwhile, China started constructing its first missile test site in the Gobi desert of Inner Mongolia, which later became the famous Jiuquan Satellite Launch Center (酒泉卫星发射中心), China's first spaceport.

After the launch of mankind's first artificial satellite, Sputnik 1, by the Soviet Union on October 4, 1957, Mao Zedong decided during the 8th National Congress of the Chinese Communist Party (CCP) on May 17, 1958, to make China an equal of the superpowers (Chinese: "我们也要搞人造卫星"; lit. 'We too need satellites'), by adopting Project 581 with the objective of placing a satellite in orbit by 1959 to celebrate the 10th anniversary of the PRC's founding. This goal was soon proven unrealistic, and it was decided to focus on the development of sounding rockets first.

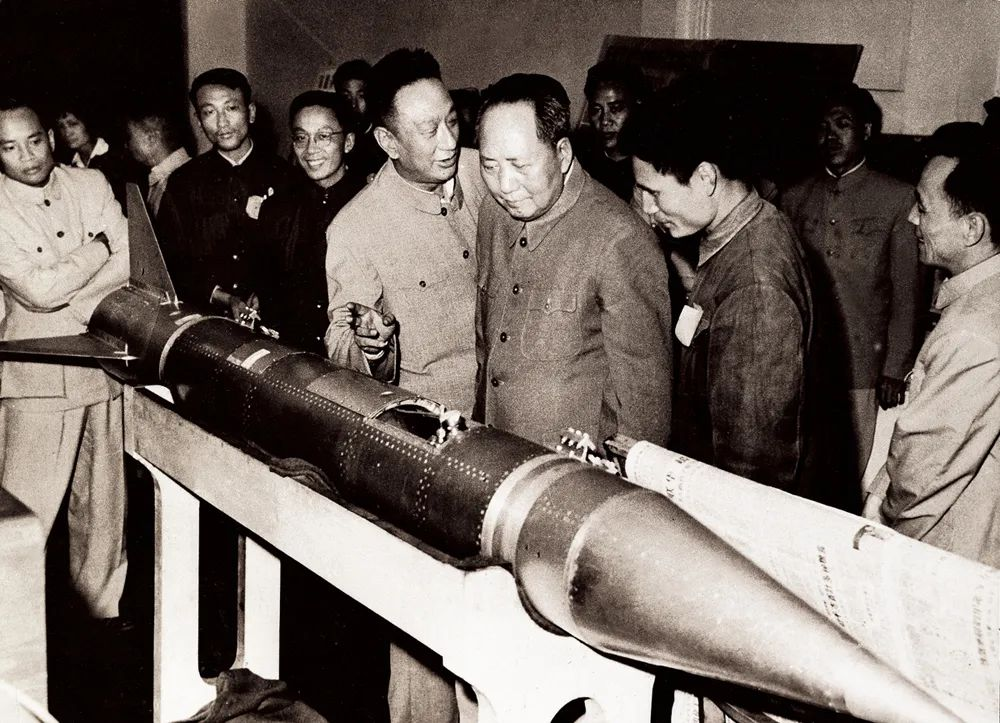
Mao Zedong inspecting a T-7M rocket after its successful launch

The first achievement of the program was the launch of T-7M, a sounding rocket that eventually reached the height of 8 km on February 19, 1960. It was the first rocket developed by Chinese engineers. The success was praised by Mao Zedong as a good beginning of an indigenous Chinese rocket development. However, all Soviet technological assistance was abruptly withdrawn after the 1960 Sino-Soviet split, and Chinese scientists continued on the program with extremely limited resources and knowledge. It was under these harsh conditions that China successfully launched the first "missile 1059", fueled by alcohol and liquid oxygen, on December 5, 1960, marking a successful imitation of Soviet missile. The missile 1059 was later renamed as Dongfeng-1 (DF-1, 东风一号).

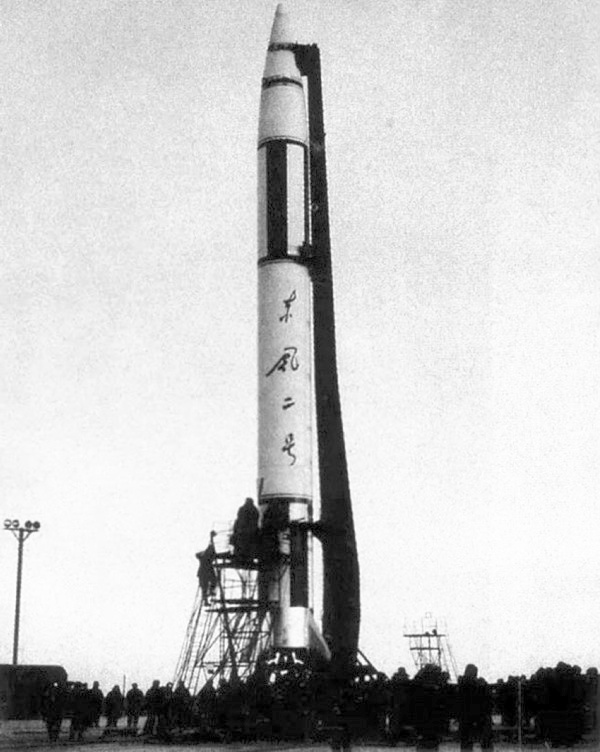
Dongfeng-2 missile

While the imitation of Soviet missile was still in progress, the Fifth Academy led by Qian had begun the development of Dongfeng-2 (DF-2), the first missile to be designed and built completely by the Chinese. After a failed attempt in March 1962, multiple improvements, and hundreds of engine firing tests, DF-2 achieved its first successful launch on its second attempt on Jun 29, 1964 in Jiuquan. It was considered as a major milestone in China's indigenous missile development history.

In the next few years, Dongfeng-2 conducted seven more launches, all ended in success. On October 27, 1966, as part of the "Two Bombs, One Satellite" project, Dongfeng-2A, an improved version of DF-2, successfully launched and detonated a nuclear warhead at its target. As China's missile industry matures, a new plan of developing carrier rockets and launching satellites was proposed and approved in 1965 with the name Project 581 changed to Project 651. On January 30, 1970, China successfully tested the newly developed two-stage Dongfeng-4 (DF-4) missile, which demonstrated critical technologies like rocket staging, engine in-flight ignition, attitude control. The DF-4 was used to develop the Long March 1 (LM-1 or CZ-1, 长征一号), with a newly designed spin-up orbital insertion solid-propellant rocket motor third stage added to the two existing Nitric acid/UDMH liquid propellant stages.

China's space program benefited from the Third Front campaign to develop basic industry and national defense industry in China's rugged interior in preparation for potential invasion by the Soviet Union or the United States. Almost all of China's new aerospace work units in the late 1960s and early 1970s were established as part of the Third Front and Third Front projects included expansion of Jiuquan Satellite Launch Center, building Xichang Satellite Launch Center, and building Taiyuan Satellite Launch Center.

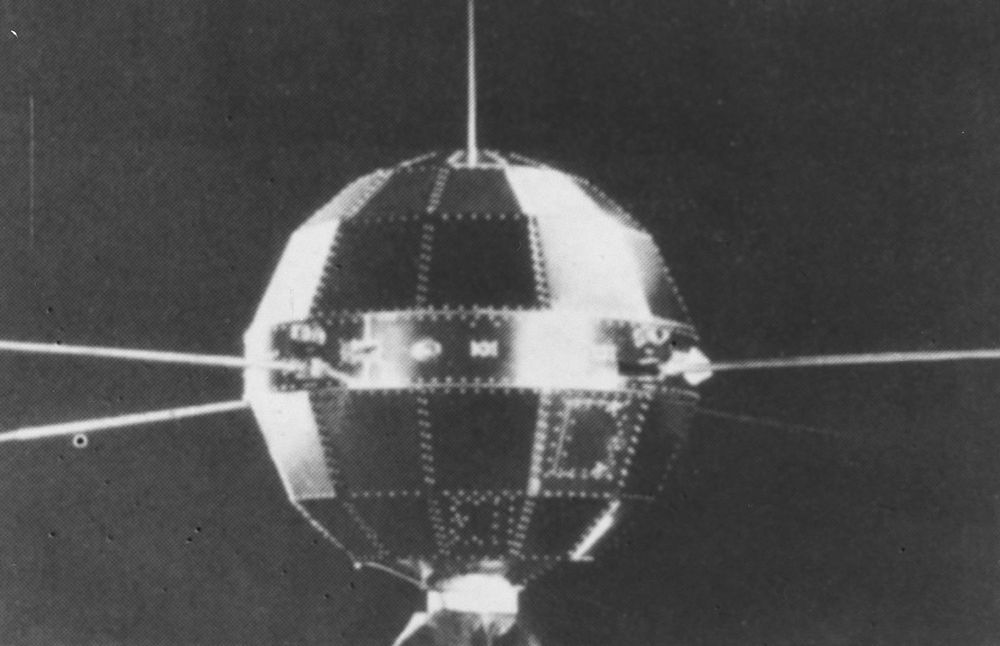
Dong Fang Hong I - First Chinese satellite (1970)

On April 24, 1970, China successfully launched the 173 kg Dong Fang Hong I (东方红一号, meaning The East Is Red I) atop a Long March 1 (CZ-1, 长征一号) rocket from Jiuquan Satellite Launch Center. It was the heaviest first satellite placed into orbit by a nation. The third stage of the Long March 1 was specially equipped with a 40 m^{2} solar reflector (观察球) deployed by the centrifugal force developed by the spin-up orbital insertion solid propellant stage. China's second satellite was launched with the last Long March 1 on March 3, 1971. The 221 kg ShiJian-1 (SJ-1, 实践一号) was equipped with a magnetometer and cosmic-ray/x-ray detectors.

In addition to the satellite launch, China also made small progress in human spaceflight. The first successful launch and recovery of a T-7A(S1) sounding rocket carrying a biological experiment (it carried eight white mice) was on July 19, 1964, from Base 603 (六〇三基地). As the space race between the two superpowers reached its climax with the conquest of the Moon, Mao and Zhou Enlai decided on July 14, 1967, that China should not be left behind, and started China's own crewed space program. China's first spacecraft designed for human occupancy was named Shuguang-1 (曙光一号) in January 1968. China's Space Medical Institute (航天医学工程研究所) was founded on April 1, 1968, and the Central Military Commission issued the order to start the selection of astronauts. The first crewed space program, known as Project 714, was officially adopted in April 1971 with the goal of sending two astronauts into space by 1973 aboard the Shuguang spacecraft. The first screening process for astronauts had already ended on March 15, 1971, with 19 astronauts chosen. But the program was soon canceled in the same year due to political turmoil, ending China's first human spaceflight attempt.

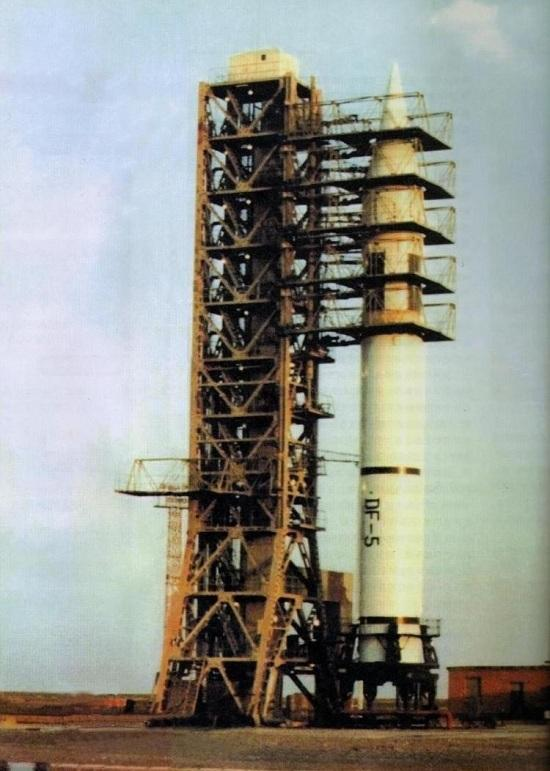
Early model of DF-5 ICBM

While CZ-1 was being developed, the development of China's first long-range intercontinental ballistic missile, namely Dongfeng-5 (DF-5), has started since 1965. The first test flight of DF-5 was conducted in 1971. After that, its technology was adopted by two different models of Chinese medium-lift launch vehicles being developed. One of the two was Feng Bao 1 (FB-1, 风暴一号) developed by Shanghai's 2nd Bureau of Mechanic-Electrical Industry, the predecessor of Shanghai Academy of Spaceflight Technology (SAST). The other parallel medium-lift LV program, also based on the same DF-5 ICBM and known as Long March 2 (CZ-2, 长征二号), was started in Beijing by the First Research Academy of the Seventh Ministry of Machine Building, which later became China Academy of Launch Vehicle Technology (CALT). Both FB-1 and CZ-2 were fueled by N_{2}O_{4} and UDMH, the same propellant used by DF-5.

On July 26, 1975, FB-1 made its first successful flight, placing the 1107-kilogram Changkong-1 (长空一号) satellite into orbit. It was the first time that China launched a payload heavier than 1 metric ton. Four months later, on November 26, CZ-2 successfully launched the FSW-0 No.1 (返回式卫星零号) recoverable satellite into orbit. The satellite returned to earth and was successfully recovered three days later, making China the third country capable of recovering a satellite, after the Soviet Union and the United States. FB-1 and CZ-2, which were developed by two different institutes, were later evolved into two different branches of the classic Long March rocket family: Long March 4 and Long March 2.

As part of the Third Front effort to relocate critical defense infrastructure to the relatively remote interior (away from the Soviet border), it was decided to construct a new space center in the mountainous region of Xichang in the Sichuan province, code-named Base 27. After expansion, the Northern Missile Test Site was upgraded as a test base in January 1976 to become the Northern Missile Test Base (华北导弹试验基地) known as Base 25.

== New era (late 1970s to 1980s) ==
After Mao died on September 9, 1976, his rival, Deng Xiaoping, denounced during the Cultural Revolution as reactionary and therefore forced to retire from all his offices, slowly re-emerged as China's new leader in 1978. At first, the new development was slowed. Then, several key projects deemed unnecessary were simply cancelled—the Fanji ABM system, the Xianfeng Anti-Missile Super Gun, the ICBM Early Warning Network 7010 Tracking Radar and the land-based high-power anti-missile laser program. Nevertheless, some development did proceed. The first Yuanwang-class space tracking ship was commissioned in 1979. The first full-range test of the DF-5 ICBM was conducted on May 18, 1980. The payload reached its target located 9300 km away in the South Pacific (7°0′S 117°33′E) and retrieved five minutes later by helicopter. In 1982, Long March 2C (CZ-2C, 长征二号丙), an upgraded version of Long March 2 based on DF-5 with 2500 kg low Earth orbit (LEO) payload capacity, completed its maiden flight. Long March 2C, along with many of its derived models, eventually became the backbone of Chinese space program in the following decades.

As China changing its direction from political activities to economy development since late 1970s, the demand for communications satellites surged. As a result, the Chinese communications satellite program, code name Project 331, was started on March 31, 1975. The first generation of China's own communication satellites was named Dong Fang Hong 2 (DFH-2, 东方红二号), whose development was led by the famous satellite expert Sun Jiadong. Since communications satellites works in the geostationary orbit much higher than what the existing carrier rockets could reach, the launching of communications satellites became the next big challenge for the Chinese space program.

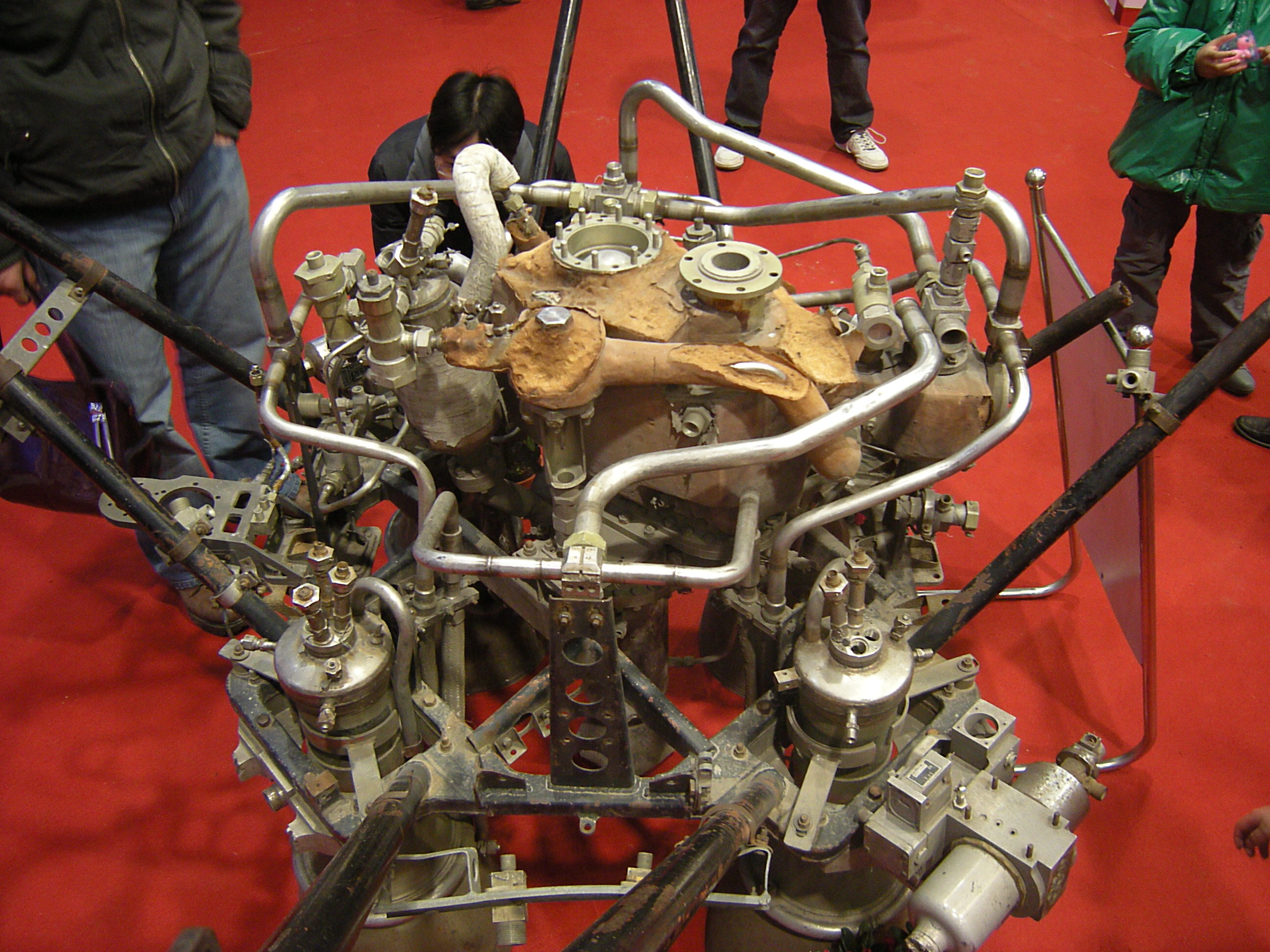
YF-73, the first cryogenic engine of China. Its development began in late 1970s.

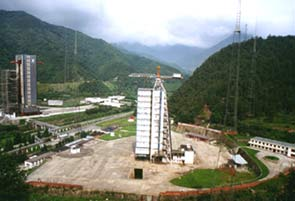
Xichang Satellite Launch Center

The task was assigned to Long March 3 (CZ-3, 长征三号), the most advanced Chinese launch vehicle in the 1980s. Long March 3 was a derivative of Long March 2C with an additional third stage, designed to send payloads to geosynchronous transfer orbit (GTO). When the development of Long March 3 began in the early 1970s, the engineers had to make a choice between the two options for the third stage engine: either the traditional engine fueled by the same hypergolic fuels used by the first two stages, or the advanced cryogenic engine fueled by liquid hydrogen and liquid oxygen. Although the cryogenic engine plan was much more challenging than the other one, it was eventually chosen by Chief Designer Ren Xinmin (任新民), who had foreseen the great potential of its use for the Chinese space program in the coming future. The development of cryogenic engine with in-flight re-ignition capability began in 1976 and wasn't completed until 1983. At the same time, Xichang Satellite Launch Center (西昌卫星发射中心) was chosen as the launch site of Long March 3 due to its low latitude, which provides better GTO launch capability.

On January 29, 1984, Long March 3 performed its maiden flight from Xichang, carrying the first experimental DFH-2 satellite. Unfortunately, because of the cryogenic third-stage engine failed to re-ignite during flight, the satellite was placed into a 400 km LEO instead of its intended GTO. Despite the rocket failure, the engineers managed to send the satellite into an elliptic orbit with an apoapsis of 6480 km using the satellite's own propulsion system. A series of tests were then conducted to verify the performance of the satellite. Thanks to the hard work by the engineers, the cause of the cryogenic engine failure was located quickly, followed by improvements applied on the second rocket awaiting launch.

On April 8, 1984, less than 70 days after the first failure, Long March 3 launched again from Xichang. It successfully inserted the second experimental DFH-2 satellite into target GTO on its second attempt. The satellite reached the final orbit location on April 16 and was handed over to the user on May 14, becoming China's first geostationary communications satellite. The success made China the fifth country in the world with independent geostationary satellite development and launch capability. Less than two years later, on February 1, 1986, the first practical DFH-2 communications satellite was launched into orbit atop a Long March 3 rocket, ending China's reliance on foreign communications satellites.

During the 1980s, human spaceflights in the world became significantly more active than before as the American Space Shuttle and Soviet space stations were put in service respectively. It was in the same period that the previously canceled Chinese human spaceflight program was quietly revived again. In March 1986, Project 863 (863计划) was proposed by four scientists Wang Daheng, Wang Ganchang, Yang Jiachi, and Chen Fangyun. The goal of the project was to stimulate the development of advanced technologies, including human spaceflight. Followed by the approval of Project 863, the early study of the Chinese human spaceflight program in the new era had begun.

== The rise and fall of commercial launches (1990s) ==
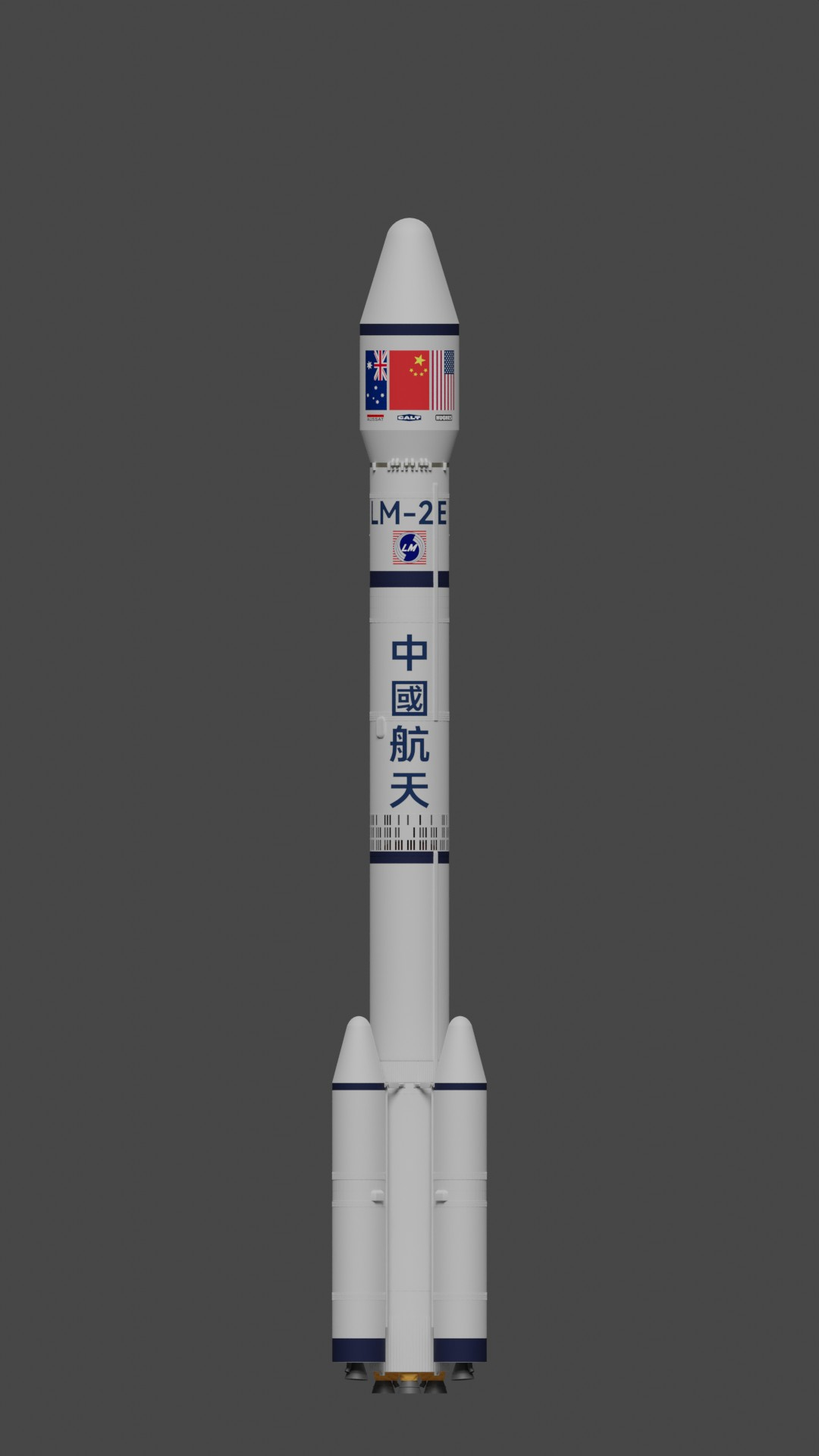
Rendering of Long March 2E rocket to launch Optus satellites

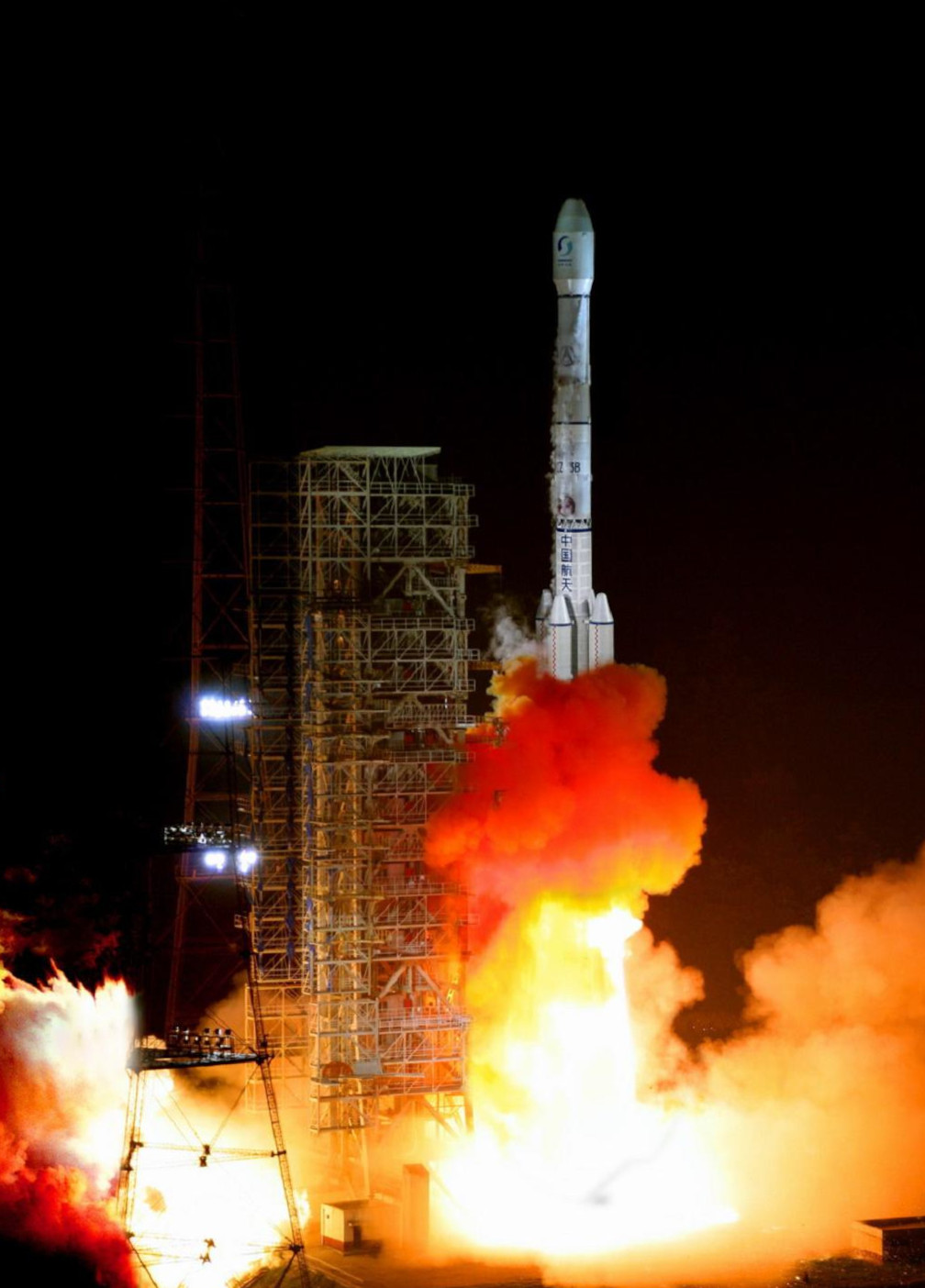
The launch of Long March 3B Rocket in 1997

After the initial success of Long March 3, further development of the Long March rocket series allowed China to announce a commercial launch program for international customers in 1985, which opened up a decade of commercial launches by Chinese launch vehicles in the 1990s. The launch service was provided by China Great Wall Industry Corporation (CGWIC) with support from CALT, SAST and China Satellite Launch and Tracking Control General (CLTC). The first contract was signed with AsiaSat in January 1989 to launch AsiaSat 1, a communications satellite manufactured by Hughes. It was previously a satellite owned by Westar but placed into a wrong orbit due to kick motor malfunction before being recovered in the STS-51-A mission in 1984.

On April 7, 1990, a Long March 3 rocket successfully launched AsiaSat 1 into target geosynchronous transfer orbit with high precision, fulfilling the contract. As its very first commercial launch ended in full success, the Chinese commercial launch program was introduced to the world with a good opening.

Although Long March 3 completed its first commercial mission as expected, its 1,500 kg payload capability was not capable of placing the new generation of communication satellites, which were usually over 2,500 kg, into geostationary transfer orbit. To deal with the problem, China introduced Long March 2E (CZ-2E, 长征二号E), the first Chinese rocket with strap-on boosters that can place up to a 3,000 kg payload into GTO. The development of Long March 2E began in November 1988 when CGWIC was awarded the contract of launching two Optus satellites by Hughes mostly due to its low price. At that time, neither the rocket nor the launch facility were anything more than concepts on paper. Yet the engineers of CALT eventually built all the hardware from scratch in a record-breaking period of 18 months, which impressed the American experts. On September 16, 1990, Long March 2E, carrying an Optus mass simulator, conducted its test flight and reached intended orbit as designed. The success of the test flight was a huge inspiration for all parties involved and brought optimism about the coming launch of actual Optus satellites.

However, an accident occurred during this highly anticipated launch on March 22, 1992, at Xichang Satellite Launch Center. After initial ignition, all engines shut down unexpectedly. The rocket was unable to lift off, resulting in a launch abort while being live-streamed to the world. The post-launch investigation revealed that some minor aluminum scraps caused a shortage in the control circuit, triggering an emergency shutdown of all engines. Although the huge vibration brought by the short-lived ignition had led to a rotation of the whole rocket by 1.5 degree clockwise and partial displacement of the supporting blocks, the rocket filled with propellant was still standing on the launch pad when the dust settled. After a rescue mission that lasted for 39 hours, the payload, rocket, and launch facilities were all preserved intact, avoiding huge losses. Less than five months later, on August 14, a new Long March 2E rocket successfully lifted off from Xichang, sending the Optus satellite into orbit.

In June 1993, the China Aerospace Corporation was founded in Beijing. It was also granted the title of China National Space Administration (CNSA). An improved version of Long March 3, namely Long March 3A (CZ-3A, 长征三号甲) with a 2,600 kg payload capacity to GTO, was put into service in 1994. However, on February 15, 1996, during the first flight of the further improved Long March 3B (CZ-3B, 长征三号乙) rocket carrying Intelsat 708, the rocket veered off course immediately after clearing the launch platform, crashing 22 seconds later. The crash killed 6 people and injured 57, making it the most disastrous event in the history of the Chinese space program. Although the Long March 3 rocket successfully launched APStar 1A communication satellites on July 3, it came across a third stage re-ignition malfunction during the launch of ChinaSat 7 on August 18, resulting in another launch failure.

The two launch failures within a few months dealt a severe blow to the reputation of the Long March rockets. As a consequence, the Chinese commercial launch service was facing canceled orders, refusal of insurance, or greatly increased insurance premiums. Under such a harsh circumstance, the Chinese space industry initiated full-scale quality improving activities. A closed-loop quality management system was established to fix quality issues in both the technical and administrative aspects. The strict quality management system remarkably increased the success rate ever since. Within the next 15 years, from October 20, 1996, up until August 16, 2011, China had achieved 102 consecutive successful space launches. On August 20, 1997, Long March 3B accomplished its first successful flight on its second attempt, placing the 3,770 kg Agila-2 communications satellite into orbit. It offered a GTO payload capacity as high as 5,000 kg, capable of putting different kinds of heavy satellites available on the international market into orbit. Ever since then, Long March 3B has become the backbone of China's mid to high Earth orbit launches and been granted the title of most powerful rocket by China for nearly 20 years. In 1998, the administrative branch of the China Aerospace Corporation was split and then merged into the newly founded Commission for Science, Technology and Industry for National Defense while retaining the title of CNSA. The remaining part was split again into the China Aerospace Science and Technology Corporation (CASC) and the China Aerospace Science and Industry Corporation (CASIC) in 1999.

While the Long March rockets were trying to take back the commercial launch market they lost, political suppression from the United States approached. In 1998, the United States accused Hughes and Loral of exporting technologies that inadvertently helped China's ballistic missile program while resolving issues that caused the Long March rocket launch failures. The accusation ultimately led to the release of the Cox Report, which further accused China of stealing sensitive technologies. In the next year, the U.S. Congress passed the act that put commercial satellites into the list restricted by International Traffic in Arms Regulations (ITAR) and prohibited launches of satellites containing U.S. made components onboard Chinese rockets. The regulation abruptly killed the commercial cooperation between China and the United States. The two Iridum satellites launched by Long March 2C on June 12, 1999, became the last batch of American satellites launched by Chinese rocket. Furthermore, due to the strict regulations applied and the U.S. dominance in space industries, the Long March rockets were de facto excluded from the international commercial launch market, causing a stagnation of the Chinese commercial launch program for the next few years.

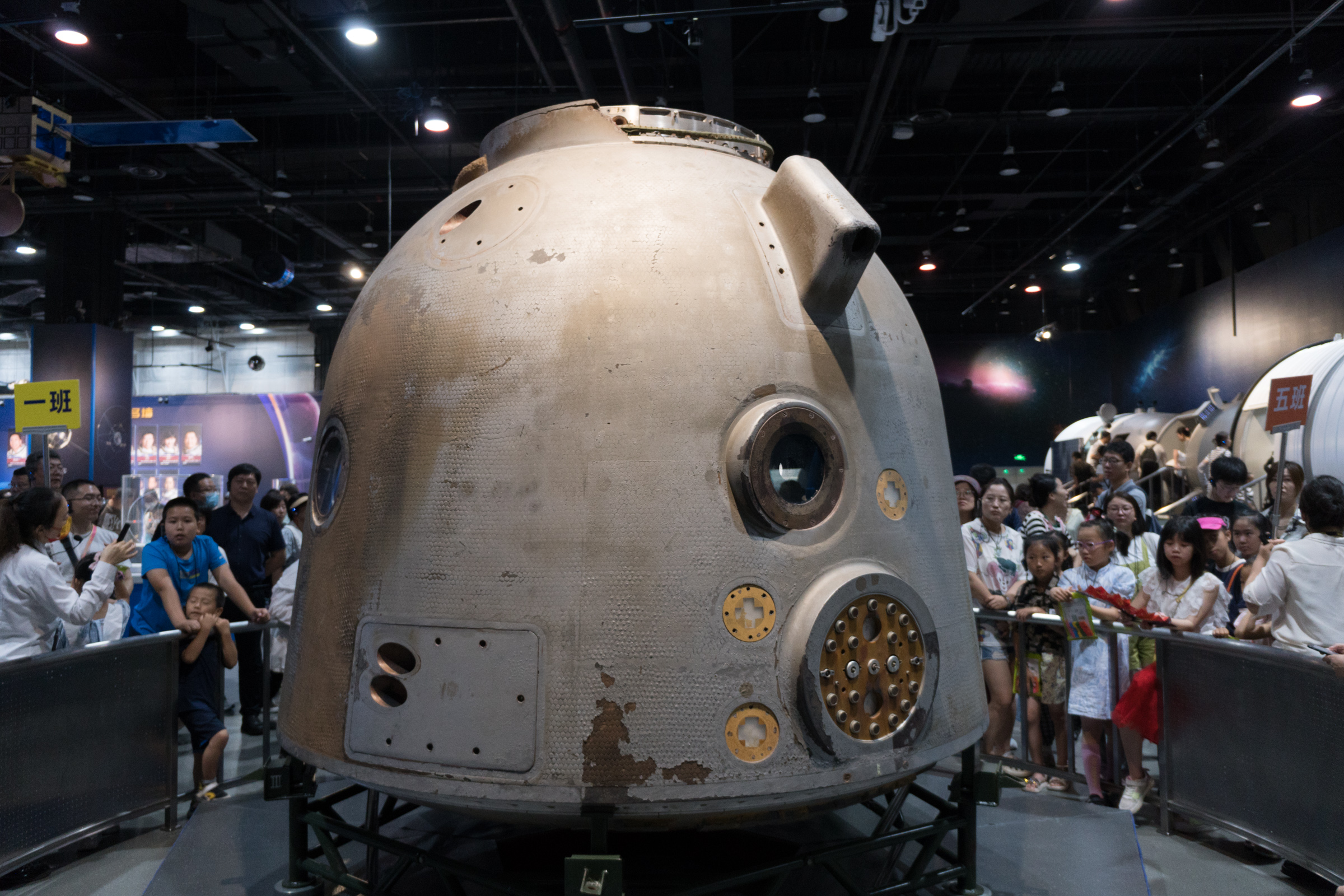
Return capsule of Shenzhou 1

Despite the turmoil of commercial launches, the Chinese space program still made a huge breakthrough near the end of the decade. At 6:30 (China Standard Time) on November 20, 1999, Shenzhou-1 (神舟一号), the first uncrewed Shenzhou spacecraft (神舟载人飞船) designed for human spaceflight, was successfully launched atop a Long March 2F (CZ-2F, 长征二号F) rocket from Jiuquan Satellite Launch Center. The spacecraft was inserted into low earth orbit 10 minutes after lift off. After orbiting the Earth for 14 rounds, the spacecraft initiated the return procedure as planned and landed safely in Inner Mongolia at 03:41 on November 21, marking the full success of China's first Shenzhou test flight. Following the announcement of the success of the mission, the previously secretive Chinese human spaceflight program, namely the China Manned Space Program (CMS, 中国载人航天工程), was formally made public. CMS, which was formally approved on September 21, 1992, by the CCP Politburo Standing Committee as Project 921, has been the most ambitious space program of China since its birth. Its goals can be described as "Three Steps": Crewed spacecraft launch and return; Space laboratory for short-term missions; Long-term modular space station. Due to its complex nature, a series of advanced projects were introduced by the program, including Shenzhou spacecraft, Long March 2F rocket, human spaceflight launch site in Jiuquan, Beijing Aerospace Flight Control Center, and Astronaut Center of China in Beijing. In terms of astronauts, fourteen candidates were selected to form the People's Liberation Army Astronaut Corps and started accepting spaceflight training.

== Breakthroughs by Shenzhou and Chang'e (2000s) ==
Since the beginning of the 21st century, China has been experiencing rapid economic growth, leading to higher investment into space programs and multiple major achievements in the following decades. In November 2000, the Chinese government released its first white paper entitled China's Space Activities, which described its goals in the next decade as:

- To build up an earth observation system for long-term stable operation.
- To set up an independently operated satellite broadcasting and telecommunications system.
- To establish an independent satellite navigation and positioning system.
- To upgrade the overall level and capacity of China's launch vehicles.
- To realize human spaceflight and establish an initially complete R&D and testing system for manned space projects.
- To establish a coordinated and complete national satellite remote-sensing application system.
- To develop space science and explore outer space.

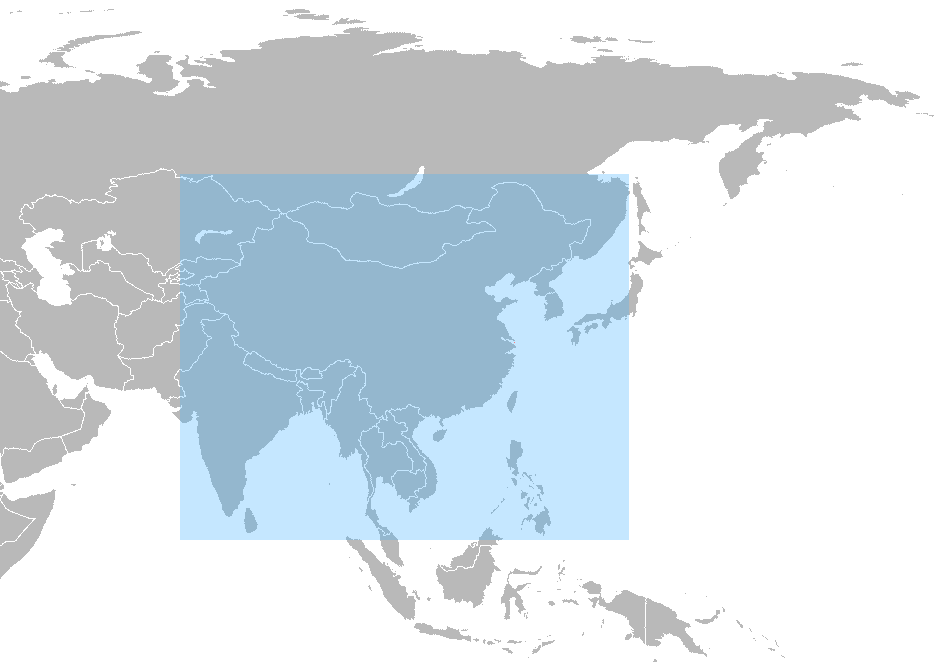
Coverage of BeiDou-1 service in early 2000s

The independent satellite navigation and positioning system mentioned by the white paper was Beidou (北斗卫星导航系统). The development of Beidou dates back to 1983 when academician of the Chinese Academy of Sciences Chen Fangyun designed a primitive satellite navigation systems consisting of two satellites in the geostationary orbit. Sun Jiadong, the famous satellite expert of China, later proposed a "three-step" strategy to develop China's own satellite navigation system, whose service coverage expands from China to Asia then the globe. The two satellites of the "first step", namely BeiDou-1, were launched in October and December 2000. As an experimental system, Beidou-1 offered basic positioning, navigation and timing services to limited areas in and around China. After a few years of experiment, China started the construction of BeiDou-2, a more advanced system to serve the Asia-Pacific region by launching the first two satellites in 2007 and 2009 respectively.

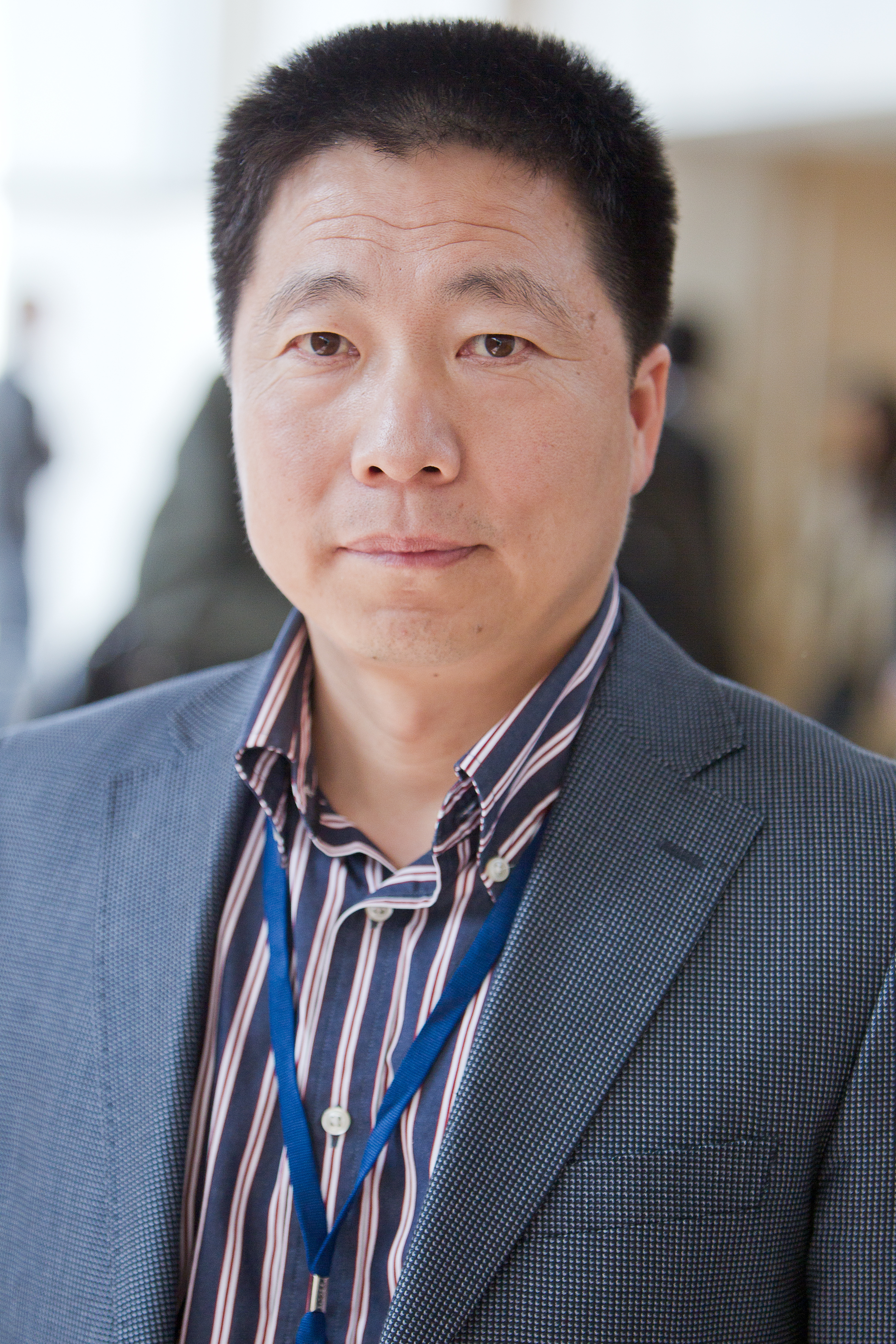
The first Chinese astronaut Yang Liwei

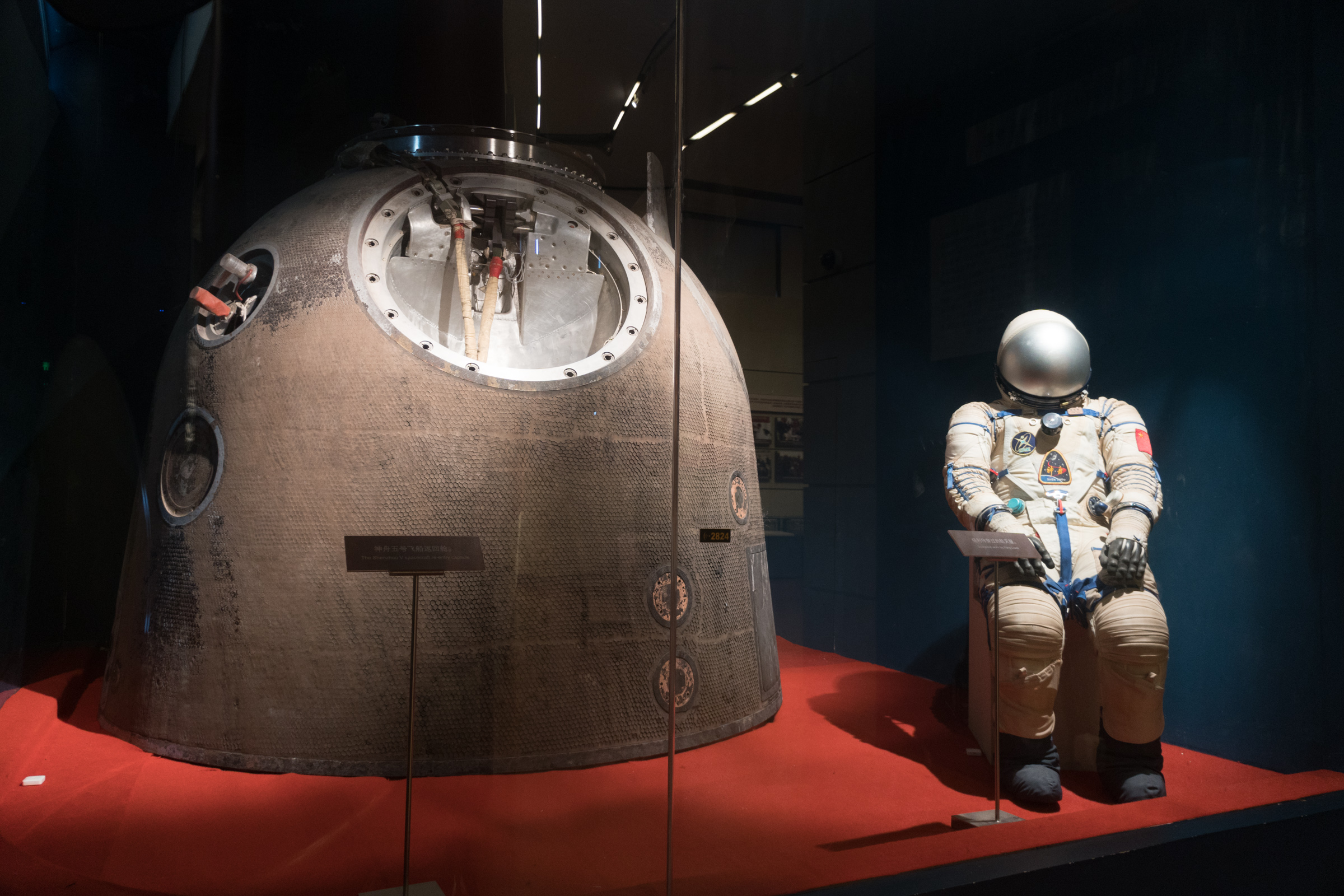
Return capsule and space suit used by Yang Liwei in Shenzhou 5 mission

Another major goal specified by the white paper was to realize crewed spaceflight. The China Manned Space Program continued its steady evolvement in the 21st century after its initial success. From January 2001 to January 2003, China conducted three uncrewed Shenzhou spacecraft test flights, validating all systems required by human spaceflight. Among these missions, the Shenzhou-4 launched on December 30, 2002, was the last uncrewed rehearsal of Shenzhou. It flew for 6 days and 18 hours and orbited around the Earth for 108 circles before returning on January 5, 2003.

On October 15, 2003, the first Chinese astronaut Yang Liwei (杨利伟) was launched aboard Shenzhou-5 (神舟五号) spacecraft atop a Long March 2F rocket from Jiuquan Satellite Launch Center. The spacecraft was inserted into orbit ten minutes after launch, making Yang the first Chinese in space. After a flight of more than 21 hours and 14 orbits around the Earth, the spacecraft returned and landed safely in Inner Mongolia in the next morning, followed by Yang's walking out of the return capsule by himself. The complete success of Shenzhou 5 mission was widely celebrated in China and received worldwide endorsements from different people and parties, including UN Secretary General Kofi Annan. The mission, officially recognized by China as the second milestone of its space program after the launch of Dongfanghong-1, marked China's standing as the third country capable of completing independent human spaceflight, ending the over 40-year long duopoly by the Soviet Union/Russia and the United States.

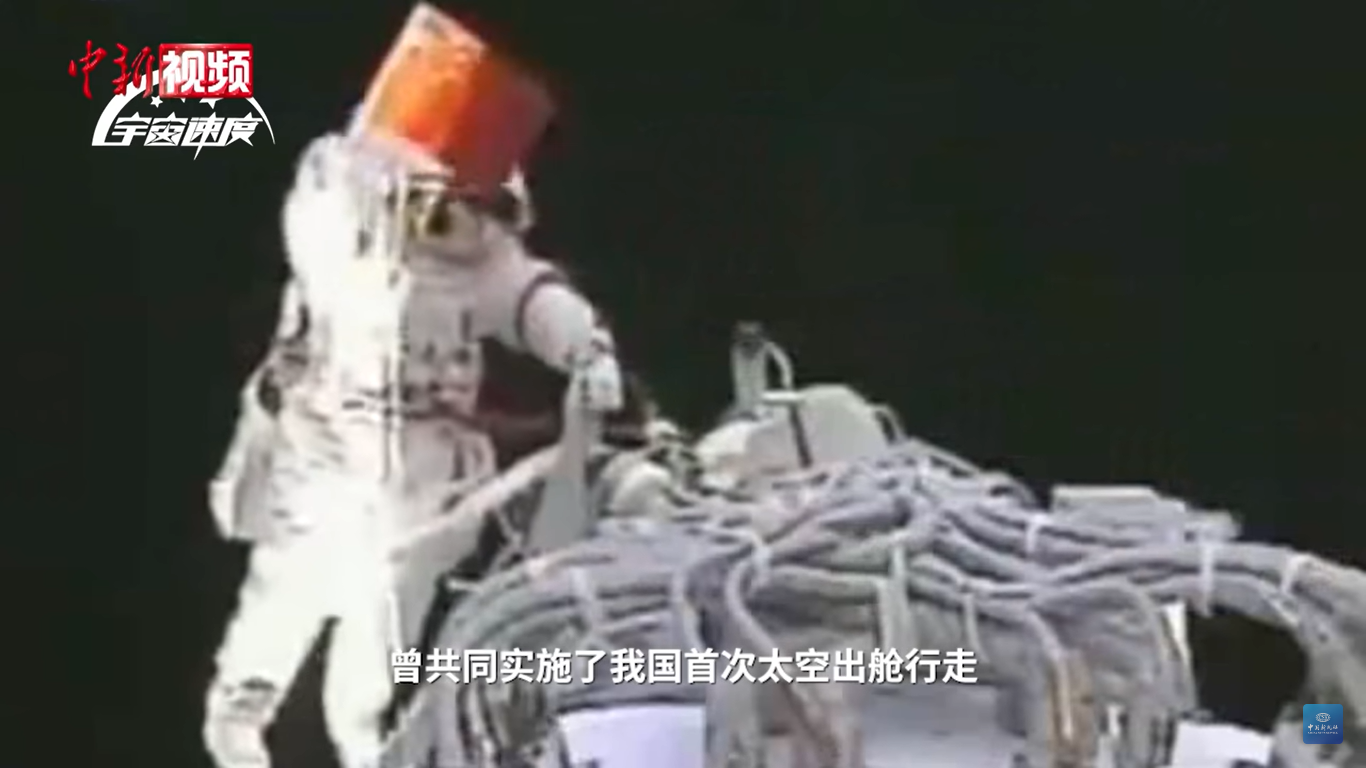
First spacewalk by Chinese astronaut in 2008

The China Manned Space Program did not stop its footsteps after its historic first crewed spaceflight. In 2005, two Chinese astronauts, Fei Junlong (费俊龙) and Nie Haisheng (聂海胜), safely completed China's first "multi-person and multi-day" spaceflight mission aboard Shenzhou-6 (神舟六号) between October 12 and 17. On 25 September 2008, Shenzhou-7 (神舟七号) was launched into space with three astronauts, Zhai Zhigang (翟志刚), Liu Boming (刘伯明) and Jing Haipeng (景海鹏). During the flight, Zhai and Liu conducted China's first spacewalk in orbit.

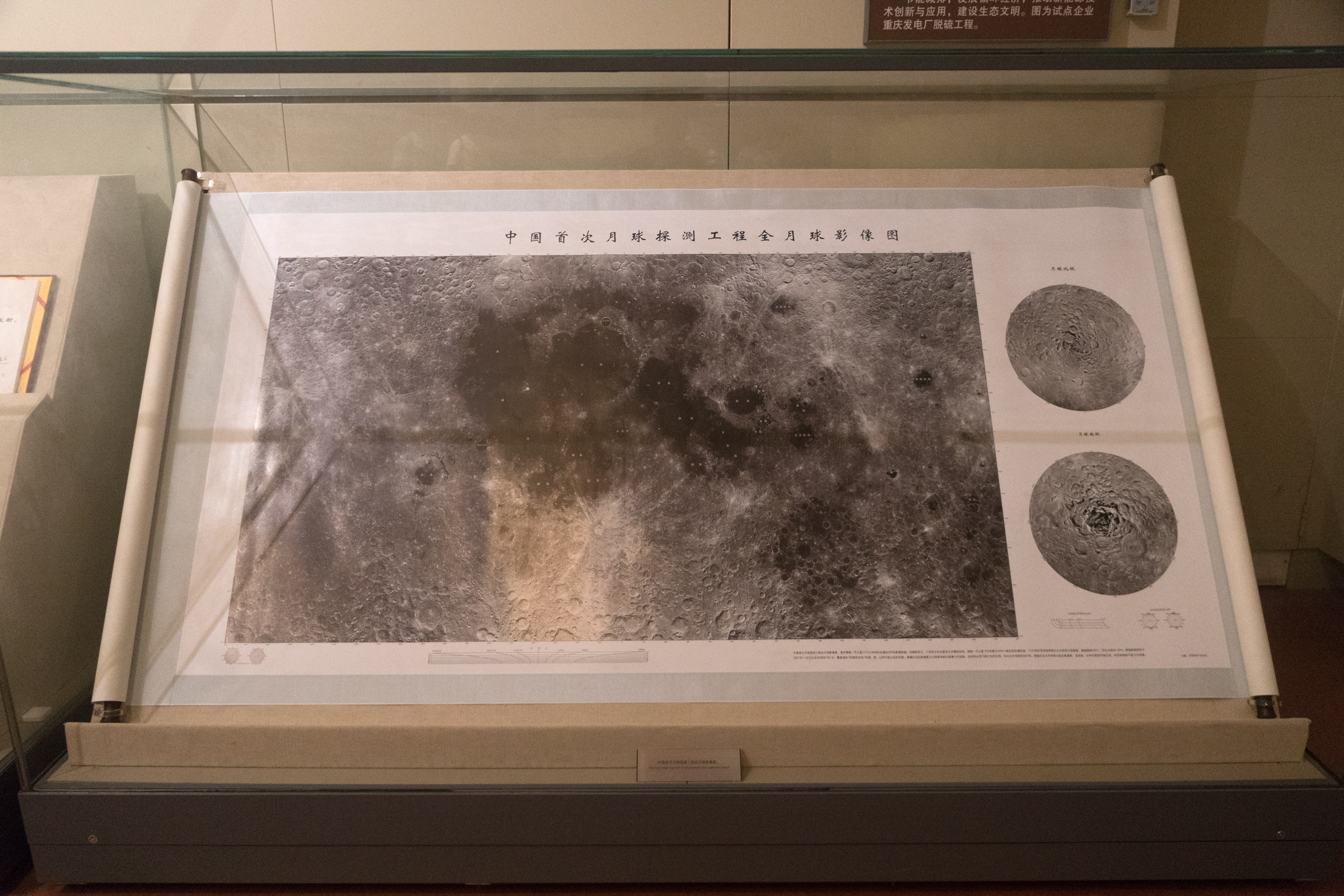
Moon map imaged by Chang'e-1

Around the same time, China began preparation for extraterrestrial exploration, starting with the Moon. The early research of Moon exploration of China dates back to 1994 when its necessity and feasibility were studied and discussed among Chinese scientists. As a result, the white paper of 2000 enlisted the Moon as the primary target of China's deep space exploration within the decade. In January 2004, the year after China's first human spaceflight mission, the Chinese Moon orbiting program was formally approved and was later transformed into Chinese Lunar Exploration Program (CLEP, 中国探月工程). Just like several other space programs of China, CLEP was divided into three phases, which were simplified as "Orbiting, Landing, Returning" (“绕、落、回”), all to be executed by robotic probes at the time of planning.

On October 24, 2007, the first lunar orbiter Chang'e-1 (嫦娥一号) was successfully launched by a Long March 3A rocket, and was inserted into Moon orbit on November 7, becoming China's first artificial satellite of the Moon. It then performed a series of surveys and produced China's first lunar map. On March 1, 2009, Chang'e-1, which had been operating longer than its designed life span, performed a controlled hard landing on lunar surface, concluding the Chang'e-1 mission. Being China's first deep space exploration mission, Chang'e-1 was recognized by China as the third milestone of the Chinese space program and the admission ticket to the world club of deep space explorations.

In 2007, China formally requested to join the International Space Station program. While the European Space Agency and Roscosmos supported cooperation with China, the US eventually rejected Chinese admission three years later, prohibiting cooperation with NASA via the Wolf Amendment.

In others areas, despite the harsh sanctions imposed by the United States since 1999, China still made some progress in terms of commercial launches in the first decade of the 21st century. In April 2005, China successfully conducted its first commercial launch since 1999 by launching the APStar 6 communications satellite manufactured by French company Alcatel atop a Long March 3B rocket. In May 2007, China launched the satellite NigComSat-1, which was developed by the China Academy of Space Technology. This was the first time China provided the full service from satellite manufacture to launch for international customers.

== Expansion and revolution (2010s) ==
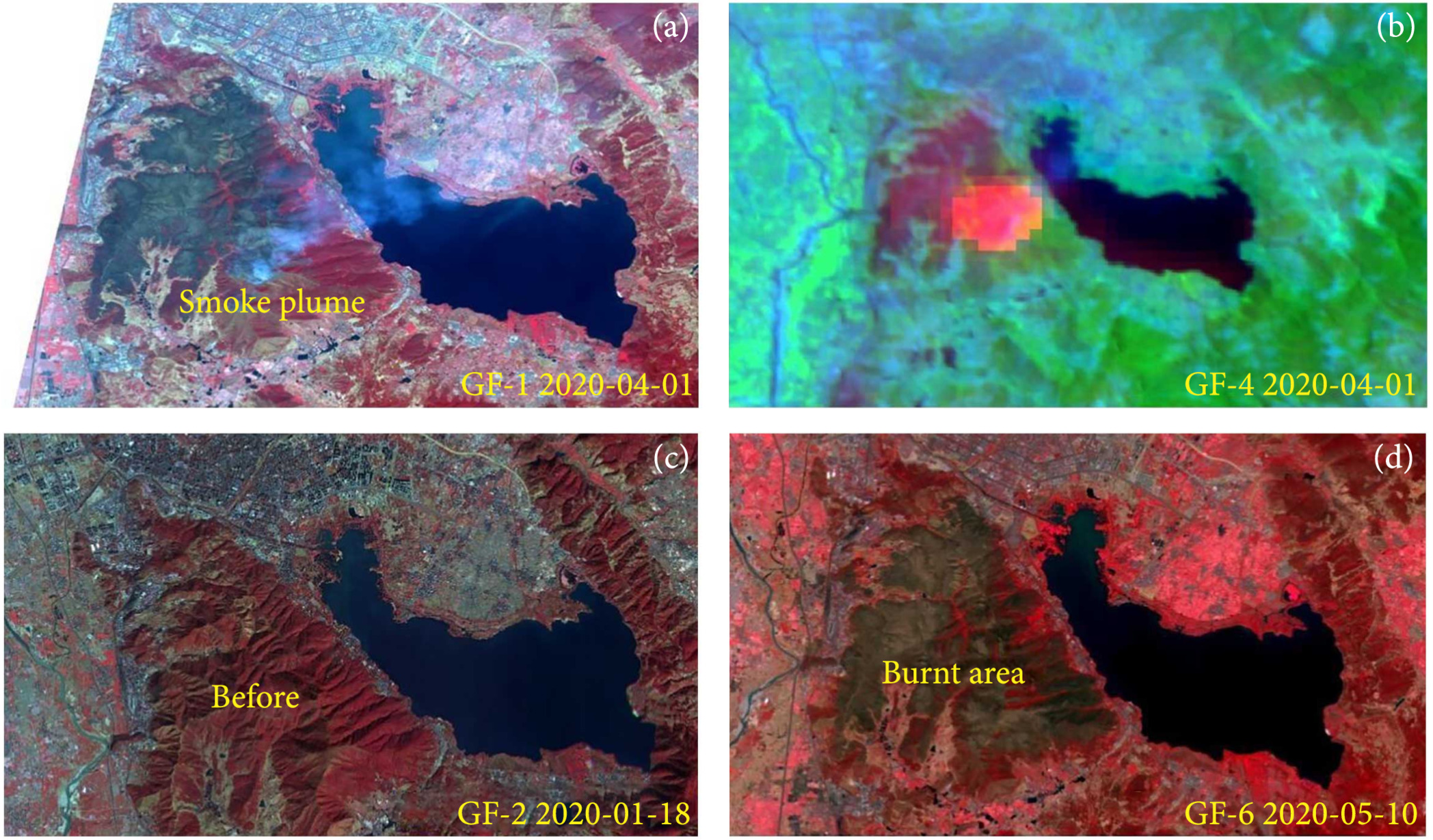
Images taken by Gaofen satellites

From 2000 to 2010, China had quadrupled its GDP and became the second largest economy in the world. Due to the rapid development of economy activities across the nation, the demand for high-resolution Earth observation systems increased in a remarkable manner. To end the reliance on foreign high-resolution remote sensing data, China initiated the China High-resolution Earth Observation System program (高分辨率对地观测系统), most commonly known as Gaofen (高分), in May 2010. Its purpose is to establish an all-day, all-weather coverage Earth observation system for satisfying the requirements of social development as part of the Chinese space infrastructures. The first Gaofen satellite, Gaofen 1, was launched into orbit on April 26, 2013, followed by more satellites being launched into different orbits in the next few years to cover different spectra. As of today, more than 30 Gaofen satellites are being operated by China as the completion of the space-based section of Gaofen was announced in late 2022.

The Beidou Navigation Satellite System proceeded in extraordinary speed after the launch of first Beidou-2 satellite in 2007. As many as five Beidou-2 navigation satellites were launched in 2010 alone. In late 2012, the Beidou-2 navigation system consisting of 14 satellites was completed and started providing service to Asia-Pacific region. The construction of more advanced Beidou-3 started since November 2017. Its buildup speed was even more astonishing than before as China launched 24 satellites into medium Earth orbit, 3 into inclined geosynchronous orbit, and 3 into geostationary orbit within just three years. The final satellite of Beidou-3 was successfully launched by a Long March 3B rocket on June 23, 2020. On July 31, 2020, CCP general secretary Xi Jinping made the announcement on the Beidou-3 completion ceremony, declaring the commission of Beidou-3 system across the globe. The completed Beidou-3 navigation system integrates navigation and communication function, and possesses multiple service capabilities, including positioning, navigation and timing, short message communication, international search and rescue, satellite-based augmentation, ground augmentation and precise point positioning. It is now one of the four core system providers designated by the International Committee on Global Navigation Satellite Systems of the United Nations.

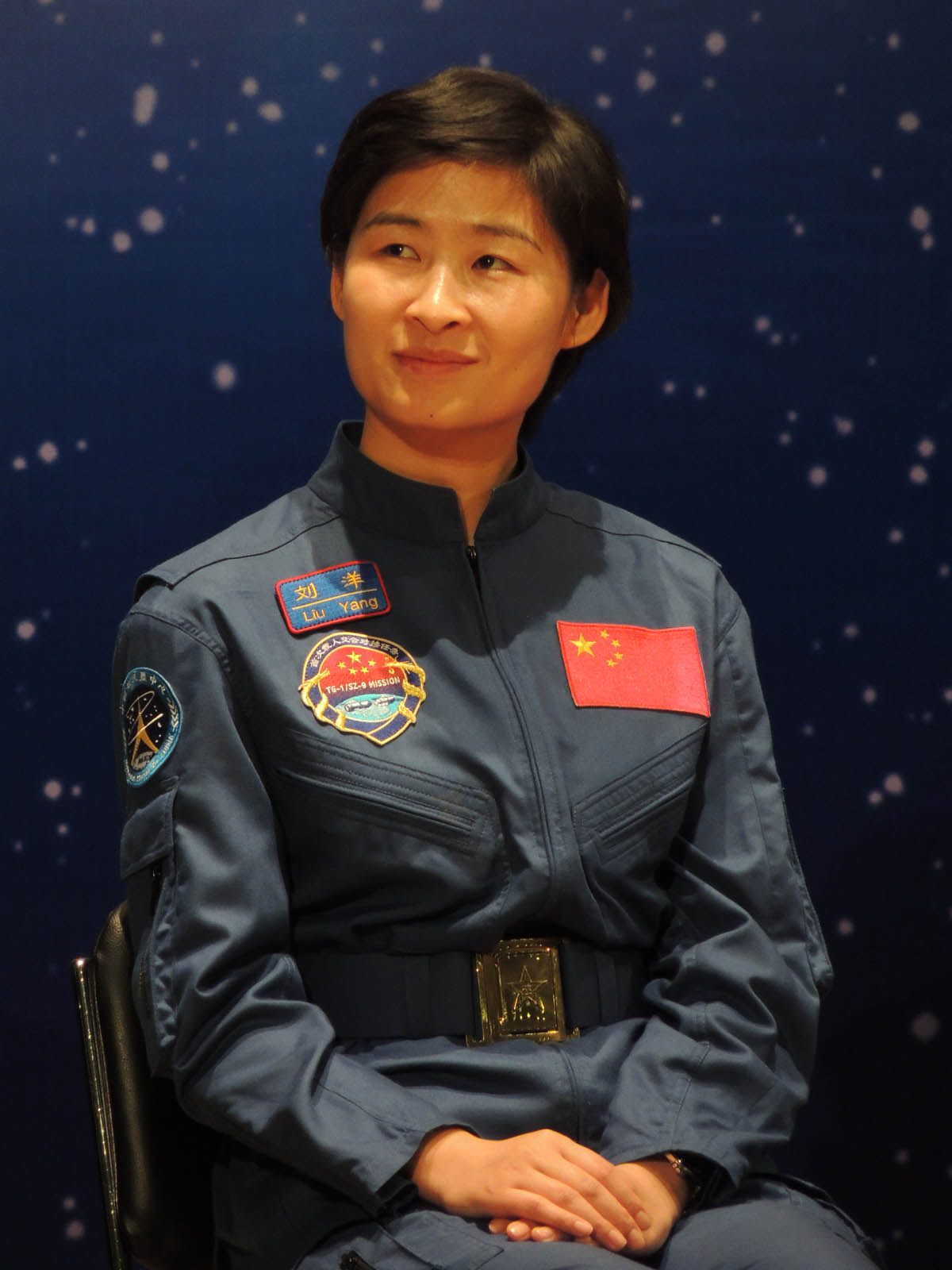
Liu Yang became the first Chinese woman in space in 2012.

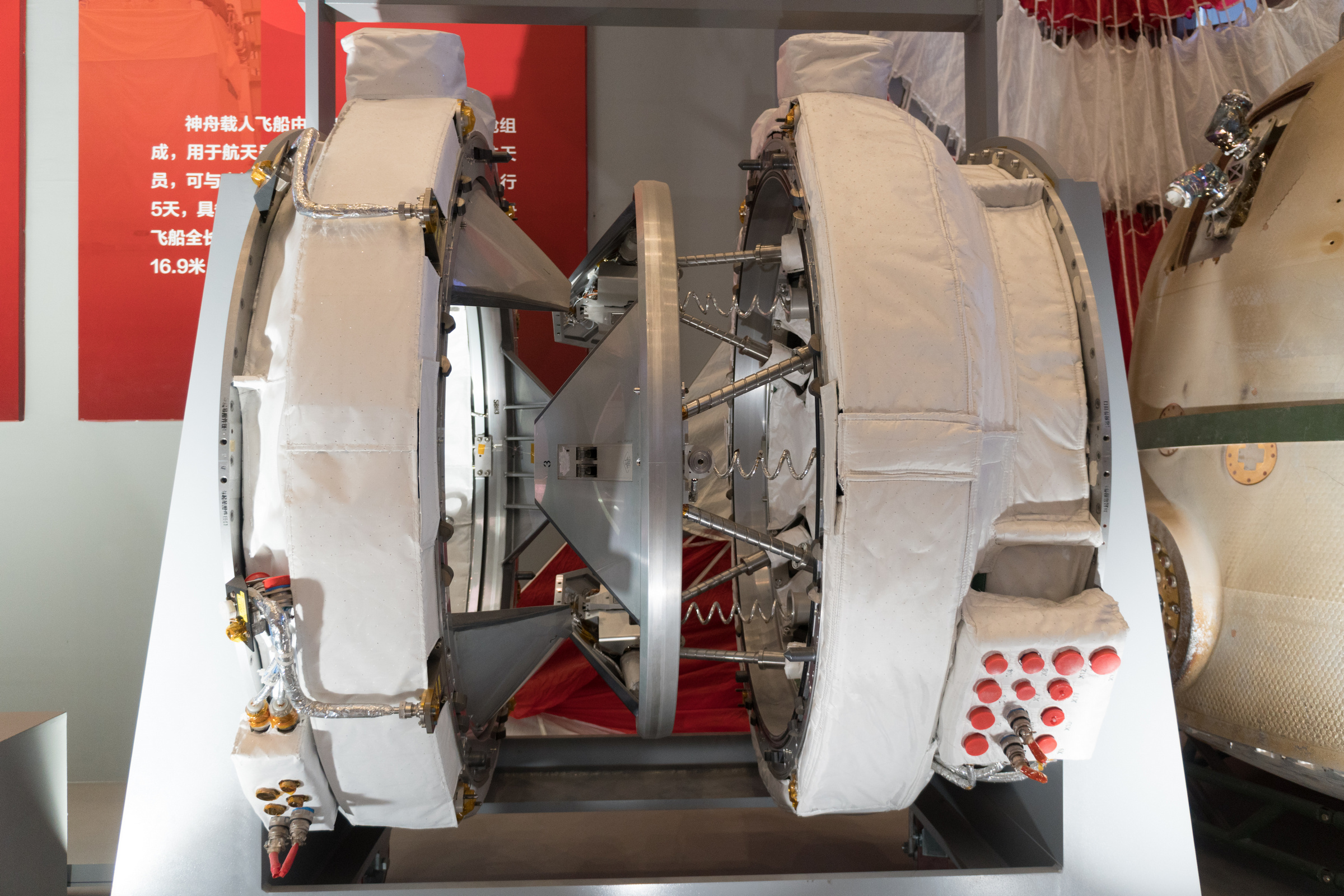
Docking device used by Chinese spacecraft

The China Manned Space Program continued to make breakthroughs in human spaceflight technologies in 2010s. In the early 2000s, the Chinese crewed space program continued to engage with Russia in technological exchanges regarding the development of a docking mechanism used for space stations. Deputy Chief Designer, Huang Weifen, stated that near the end of 2009, the China Manned Space Agency began to train astronauts on how to dock spacecraft. In order to practice space rendezvous and docking, China launched an 8,000 kg (18,000 lb) target vehicle, Tiangong-1 (天宫一号), in 2011, followed by the uncrewed Shenzhou 8 (神舟八号). The two spacecraft performed China's first automatic rendezvous and docking on 3 November 2011, which verified the performance of docking procedures and mechanisms. About 9 months later, in June 2012, Tiangong 1 completed the first manual rendezvous and docking with Shenzhou 9 (神舟九号), a crewed spacecraft carrying Jing Haipeng, Liu Wang (刘旺) and China's first female astronaut Liu Yang (刘洋). The successes of Shenzhou 8 and 9 missions, especially the automatic and manual docking experiments, marked China's advancement in space rendezvous and docking. Tiangong 1 was later docked with crewed spacecraft Shenzhou 10 (神舟十号) carrying astronauts Nie Haisheng, Zhang Xiaoguang (张晓光) and Wang Yaping (王亚平), who conducted multiple scientific experiments, gave lectures to over 60 million students in China, and performed more docking tests before returning to the Earth safely after 15 days in space. The completion of missions from Shenzhou 7 to 10 demonstrated China's mastery of all basic human spaceflight technologies, ending phase 1 of "Second Step".

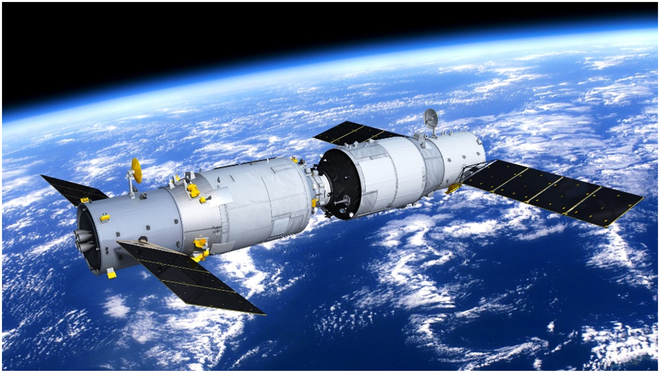
Rendering of Tianzhou-1 cargo spacecraft docked with Tiangong-2 space laboratory

Although Tiangong 1 was considered as a space station prototype, its functionality was still remarkably weaker than decent space laboratories. Tiangong-2 (天宫二号), the first real space laboratory of China, was launched into orbit on September 15, 2016. It was visited by Shenzhou 11 crew a month later. Two astronauts, Jing Haipeng and Chen Dong (陈冬) entered Tiangong 2 and were stationed for about 30 days, breaking China's record for the longest human spaceflight mission while carrying out different types of human-attended experiments. In April 2017, China's first cargo spacecraft, Tianzhou-1 (天舟一号), docked with Tiangong 2 and completed multiple in-orbit propellant refueling tests.

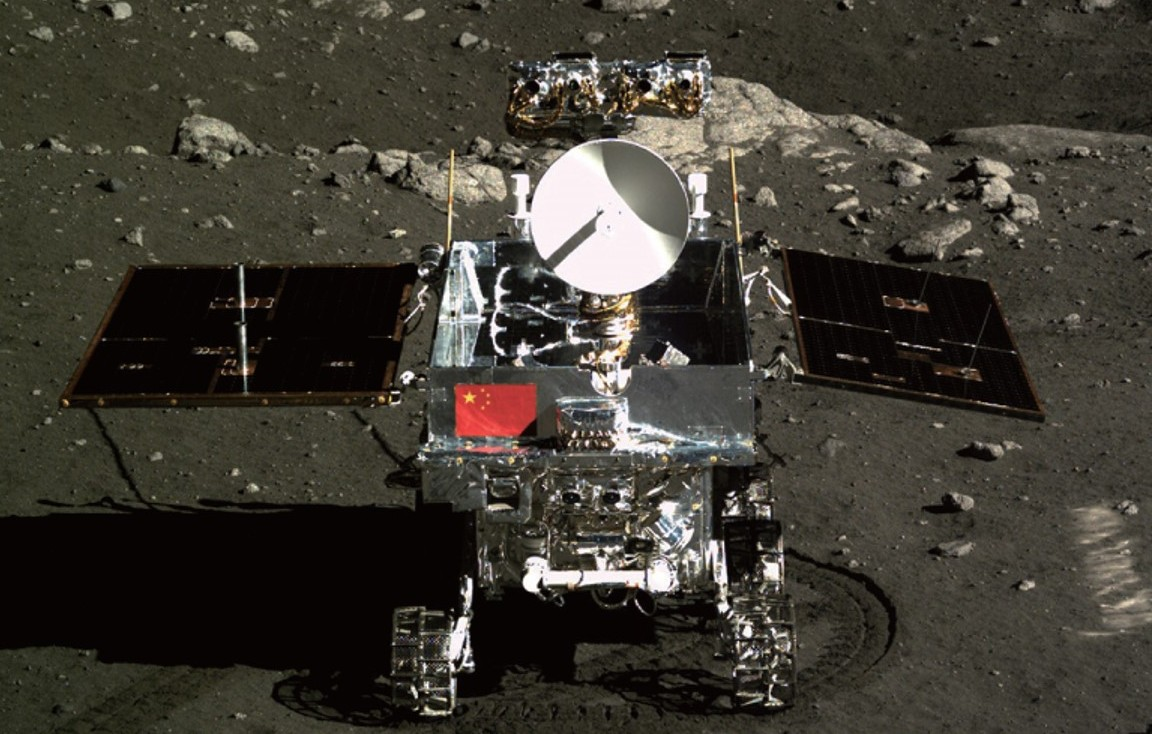
Yutu, the first Chinese lunar rover landed on an extraterrestrial body during the Chang'e-3 mission

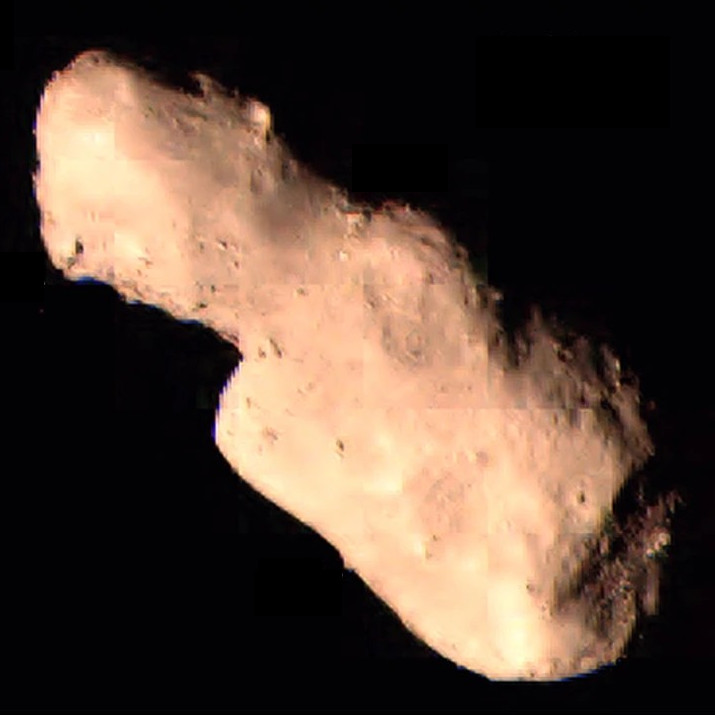
Photo of 4179 Toutatis taken by Chang'e 2 during a flyby

In terms of deep space explorations, after completing the objective of "Orbiting" in 2007, the Chinese Lunar Exploration Program started preparing for the "Landing" phase. China's second lunar probe, Chang'e-2 (嫦娥二号), was launched on October 1, 2010. It used trans-lunar injection orbit to reach the Moon for the first time and imaged the Sinus Iridum region where future landing missions were expected to occur. On December 2, 2013, a Long March 3B rocket launched Chang'e-3 (嫦娥三号), China's first lunar lander, to the Moon. On December 14, Chang'e 3 successfully landed on the Sinus Iridum region, making China the third country that made soft-landing on an extraterrestrial body. A day later, the Yutu rover (玉兔号月球车) was deployed to the lunar surface and started its survey, achieving the goal of "landing and roving" for the second phase of CLEP.

In addition to lunar exploration, it is worth noting that China made its first attempt of interplanetary exploration during the same period. Yinghuo-1 (萤火一号), China's first Mars orbiter, was launched on board the Russian Fobos-Grunt spacecraft as an additional payload in November 2011. Yinghuo-1 was a mission in cooperation with Russian Space Agency. It was a relatively small project initiated by National Space Science Center of Chinese Academy of Sciences instead of a major space program managed by the state space agency. The Yinghuo-1 orbiter weighed about 100 kg and was carried by the Fobos-Grunt probe. It was expected to detach from the Fobos-Grunt probe and injected into Mars orbit after reaching Mars. However, due to an error of the onboard computer, the Fobos-Grunt probe failed to start its main engine and was stranded in the low Earth orbit after launch. Two months later, Fobos-Grunt, along with the Yinghuo-1 orbiter, re-entered and eventually burned up in the Earth atmosphere, resulting in a mission failure. Although the Yinghuo-1 mission did not achieve its original goal due to factors not controlled by China, it led to the dawn of the Chinese interplanetary explorations by gathering a group of talents dedicated to interplanetary research for the first time. On December 13, 2012, the Chinese lunar probe Chang'e 2, which was in an extended mission after the conclusion of its primary tasks in lunar orbit, made a flyby of asteroid Toutatis with closest approach being 3.2 kilometers, making it China's first interplanetary probe. In 2016, the first Chinese independent Mars mission was formally approved and listed as one of the major tasks in "White Paper on China's Space Activities in 2016". The mission, which was planned in an unprecedented manner, aimed to achieve Mars orbiting, landing and roving in one single attempt in 2020.

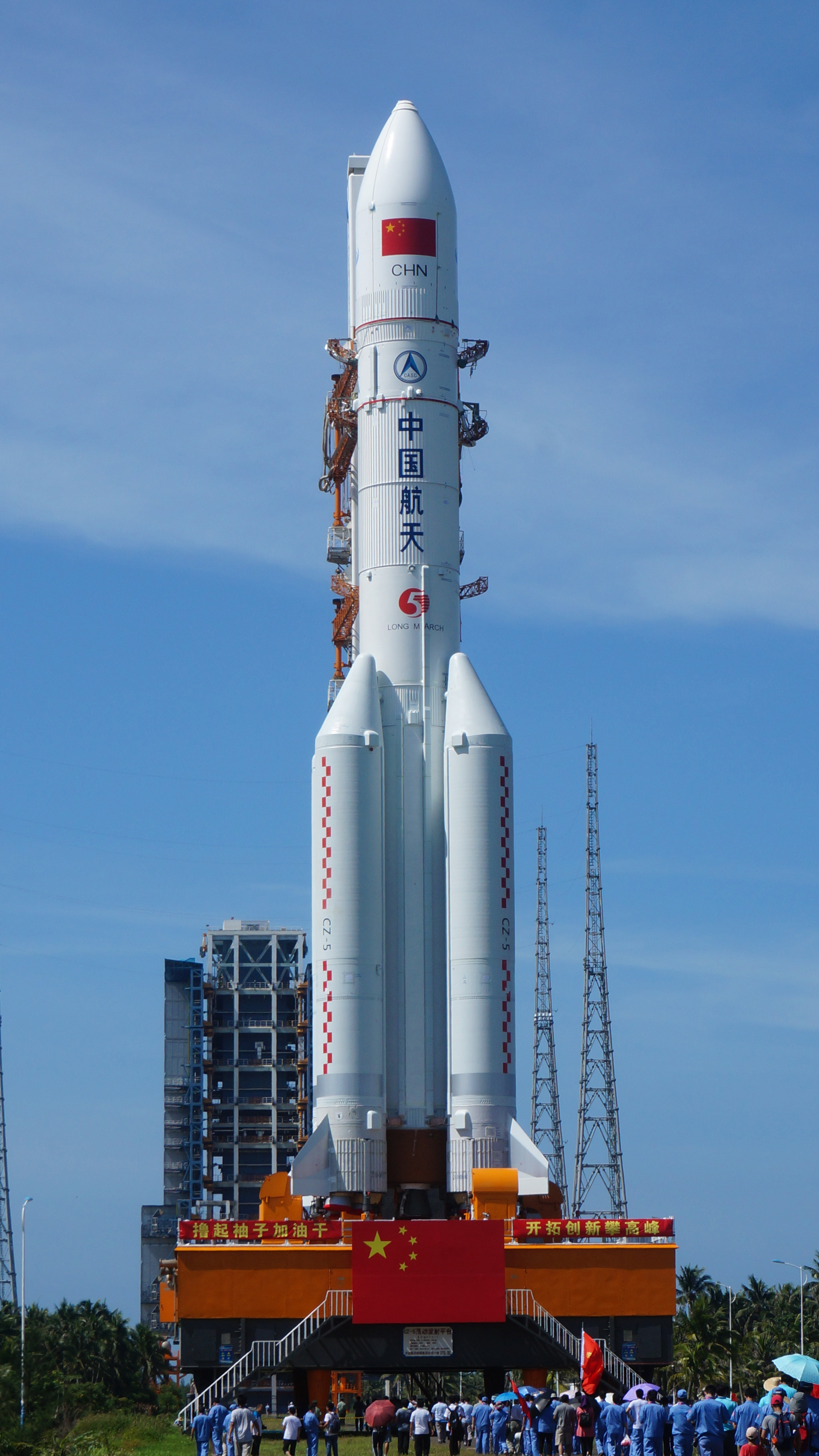
Long March 5 carrier rocket at Wenchang Space Launch Site

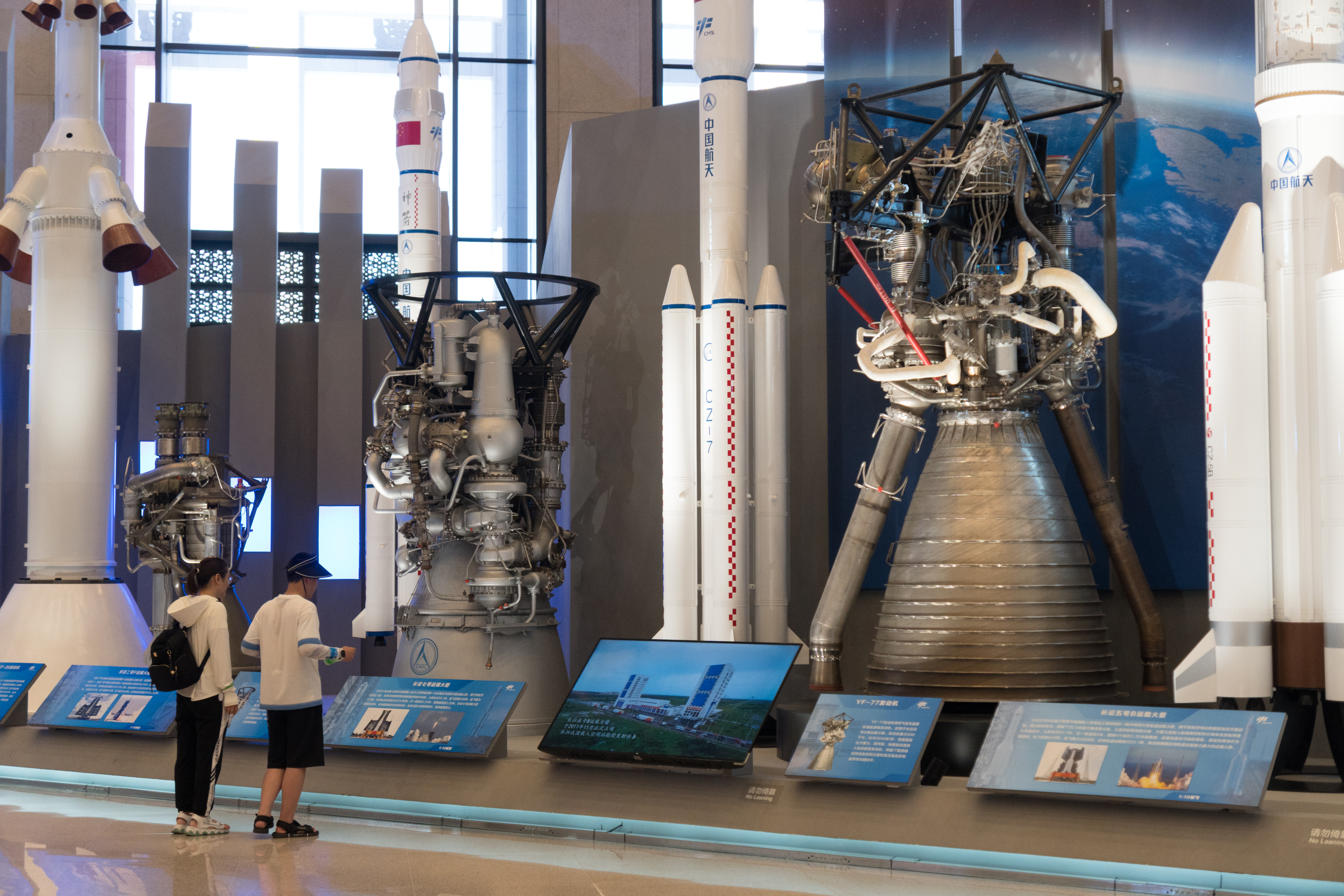
YF-100 (middle) and YF-77 (right) are two of the engines powering the new generation of Long March rockets

While China was making remarkable progress in all areas above, the Long March rockets, the absolute foundation of Chinese space program, were also experiencing a crucial revolution. Ever since 1970s, the Long March rocket family had been using dinitrogen tetroxide and UDMH as propellant for liquid engines. Although this hypergolic propellant is simple, cheap and reliable, its disadvantages, including toxicity, environmental damages, and low specific impulse, hindered Chinese carrier rockets from being competitive against other space powers since the mid-1980s. To get rid of such unsatisfying situation, China commenced the study of new propellant selection since the introduction of Project 863 in 1986. After an early study that lasted for over a decade, the development of a 120-ton rocket engine burning LOX and kerosene in staged combustion cycle were formally approved in 2000. Despite setbacks like engine explosions during initial firing tests, the development team still made breakthroughs in key technologies like superalloy production and engine ignition and completed its first long duration firing test in 2006. The engine, which was named YF-100, was eventually certified in 2012, and the first engine for actual flight was ready in 2014. On September 20, 2015, the Long March 6 (长征六号), a small rocket using one YF-100 engine on its first stage, successfully conducted its maiden flight. On June 25, 2016, the medium-lift Long March 7 (长征七号), which was equipped with six YF-100 engines, completed its maiden flight in full success, increasing the maximum LEO payload capacity by Chinese rockets to 13.5 tons. The successes of Long March 6 and 7 signified the introduction of the "new generation of Long March rockets" powered by clean and more efficient engines.

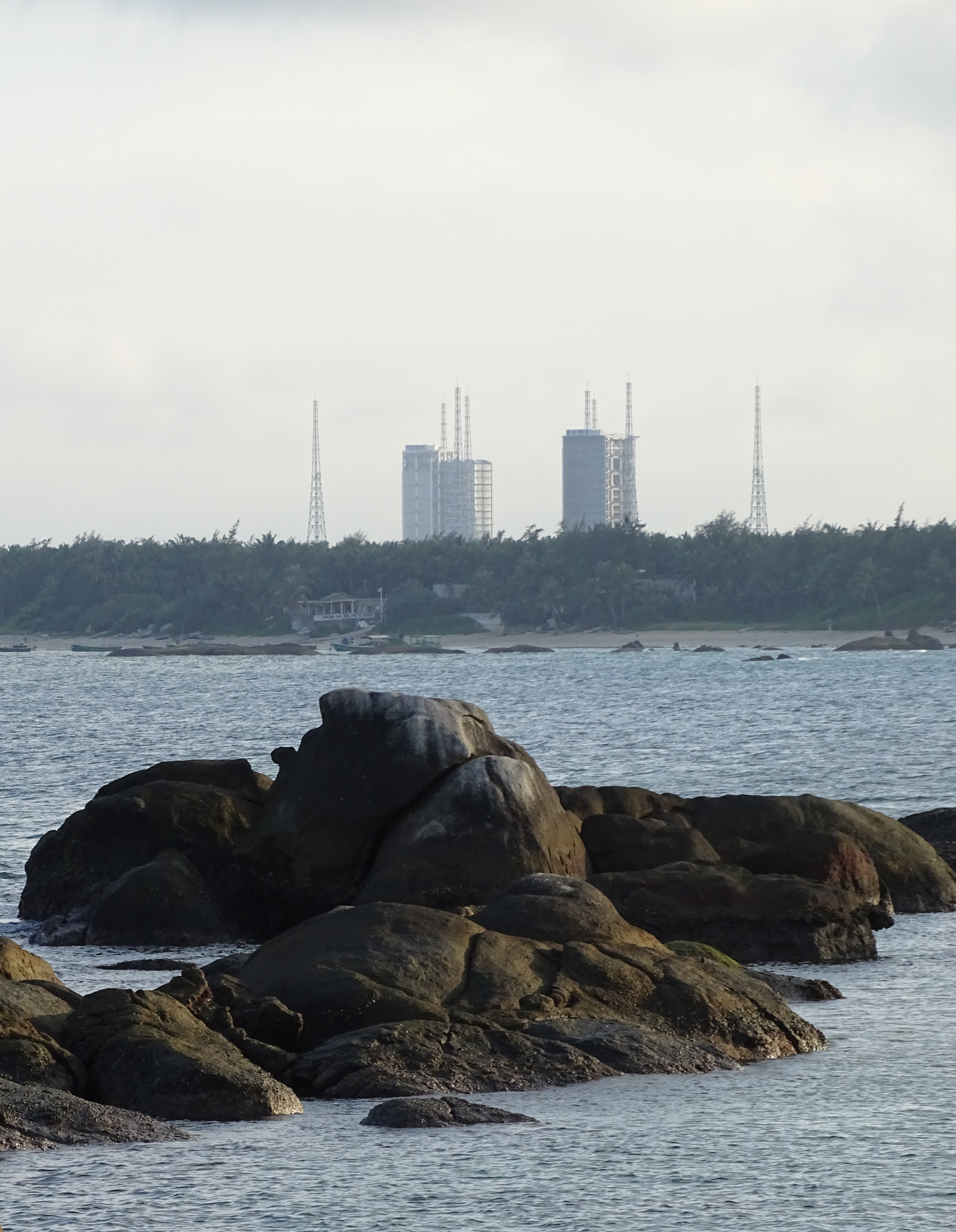
View of Wenchang Space Launch Site from nearby beach.

The maiden launch of Long March 7 was also the very first launch from Wenchang Space Launch Site (文昌航天发射场) located in Wenchang, Hainan Province. It marked the inauguration of Wenchang on the world stage of space activities. Compared with the old Jiuquan, Taiyuan, and Xichang, the Wenchang Space Launch Site, whose construction began in September 2009, is China's latest and most advanced spaceport. Rockets launched from Wenchang can send ten to fifteen percent more payloads in mass to orbit thanks to its low latitude. Additionally, due to its geographic location, the drop zones of rocket debris produced by rocket launches are in the ocean, eliminating threats posed to people and facilities on the ground. Wenchang's coastal location also allows larger rockets to be delivered to launch site by sea, which is difficult, if not impossible, for inland launch sites due to the size limits of tunnels needed to be passed through during transportations.

The biggest breakthrough within the decade, if not decades, were brought by Long March 5 (长征五号), the leading role of the new generation of Long March rockets and China's first heavy-lift launch vehicle. The early study of Long March 5 can be traced back to 1986, and the project was formally approved in mid-2000s. It applied 247 new technologies during its development while over 90% of its components were newly developed and applied for the first time. Instead of using the classic 3.35-meter-diameter core stage and 2.25-meter-diameter side boosters, the 57-meter tall Long March 5 consists of one 5-meter-diameter core stage burning LH_{2}/LOX and four 3.35-meter-diameter side boosters burning kerosene/LOX. With a launch mass as high as 869 metric tons and 10,573 kN lift-off thrust, the Long March 5, being China's most powerful rocket, is capable of lifting up to 25 tons of payload to LEO and 14 tons to GTO, making it more than 2.5 times as much as the previous record holder (Long March 3B) and nearly as equal as the most powerful rocket in the world at that time (Delta IV Heavy). Due to its unprecedented capability, the Long March 5 was expected as the keystone for the Chinese space program in the early 21st century. However, after a successful maiden flight in late 2016, the second launch of the Long March 5 on July 2, 2017, suffered a failure, which was considered as the biggest setback for Chinese space program in nearly two decades. Because of the failure, the Long March 5 was grounded indefinitely until the problem was located and resolved, and multiple planned major space missions were either postponed or facing the risk of being postponed in the next few years.

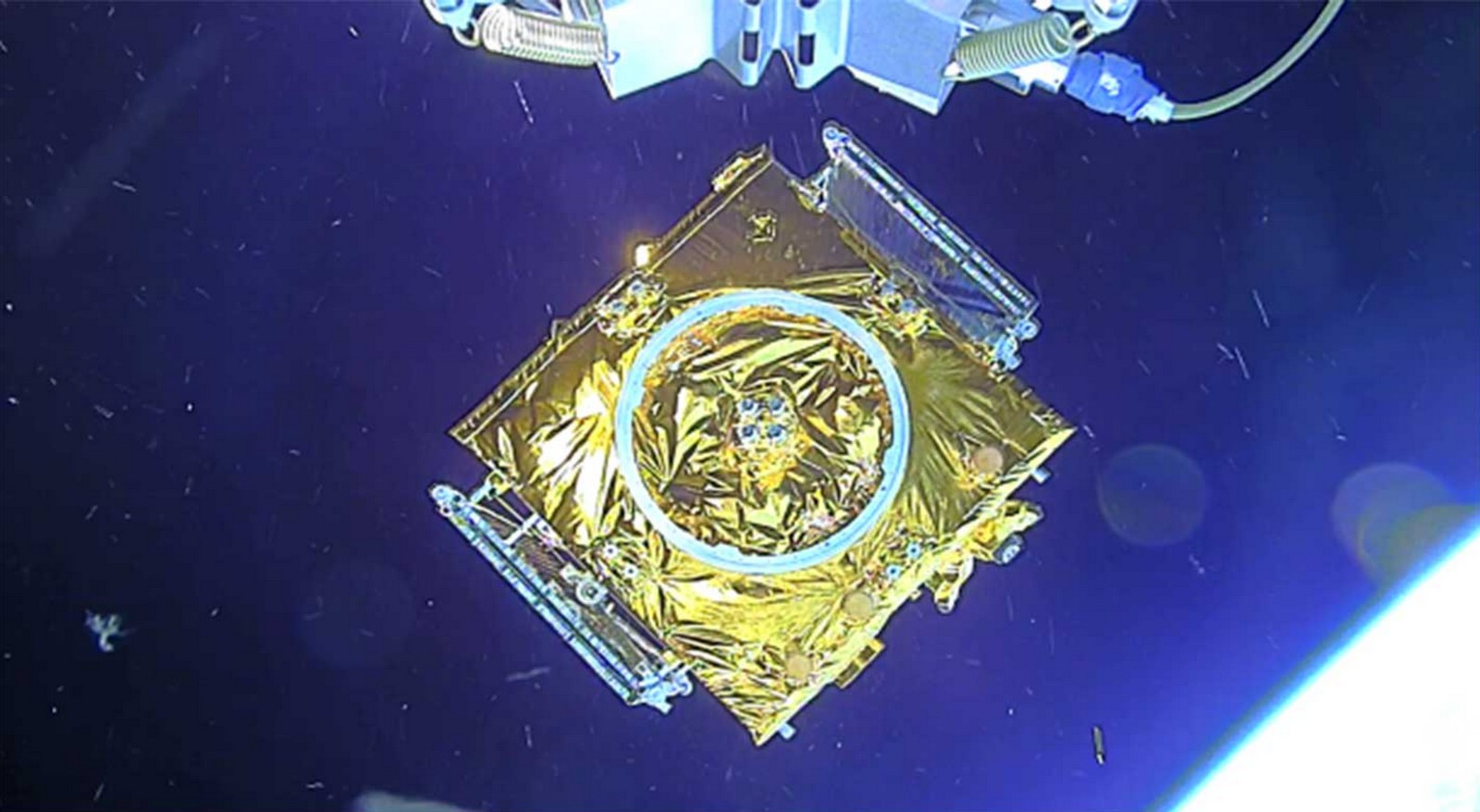
Queqiao relay satellite separating from the launch vehicle on its journey to the Moon

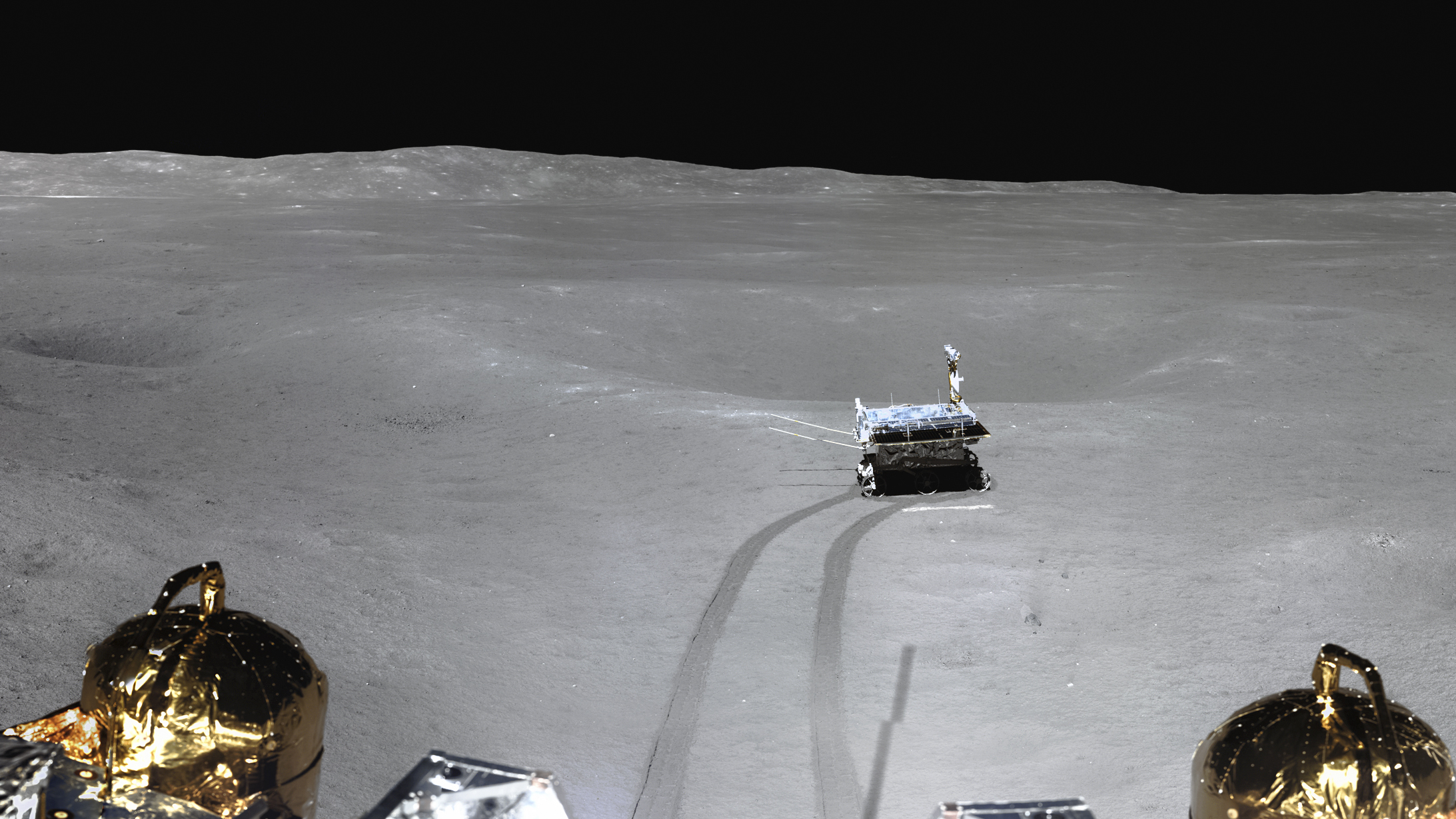
Chang'e-4 and Yutu-2 on the surface of the far side of the Moon

Despite the uncertain future of Long March 5, China managed to make history in space explorations with existing hardware in the next two years. Due to tidal locking, the Moon has been orbiting the Earth as the only natural satellite by facing it with the same side. Humans had never seen the far side of the Moon until the Space Age. Although humans have already got quite an amount of knowledge about the overall condition of the far side of the Moon in early 21st century with the help of numerous visits by lunar orbiters since the 1960s, no country had ever explored the area in close distance due to lack of communications on the far side. This missing piece was eventually filled by China's Chang'e-4 (嫦娥四号) mission in 2019. To solve the communications problem, China launched Queqiao (鹊桥号), a relay satellite orbiting around the Earth–Moon L_{2} Lagrangian point, in May 2018 to enable communications between the far side of the Moon and the Earth. On December 8, 2018, the Chang'e 4, which was originally built as the backup of Chang'e 3, was launched by a Long March 3B rocket from Xichang and entered lunar orbit on December 12. On January 3, 2019, Chang'e 4 successfully soft-landed at the Von Kármán (lunar crater) on the far side of the Moon, and returned the first close-up image of the lunar surface on the far side. A rover named Yutu-2 (玉兔二号) was deployed onto the lunar surface a few hours later, leaving the first trail on the far side. The accomplishment of a series of tasks by Chang'e-4 made China the first country to successfully achieved soft-landing and roving on the far side of the Moon. Because of its great success, the project team received IAF World Space Award of 2020.

Aside from Chang'e 4, there were some other events worth noting during this period. In August 2016, China launched world's first quantum communications satellite Mozi (墨子号). In June 2017, the first Chinese X-ray astronomy satellite named Huiyan (慧眼) was launched into space. In August of the same year, the Astronaut Center of China organized a joint training in which sixteen Chinese and two ESA astronauts participated. It was the first time that foreign astronauts took part in astronaut training organized by China. In 2018, China performed more orbital launches than any other countries on the planet for the first time in history. On June 5, 2019, China conducted its first Sea Launch with Long March 11 (长征十一号) in the Yellow Sea. On July 25, Chinese company i-Space became the first Chinese private company to successfully conduct an orbital launch with its Hyperbola-1 small solid rocket.

As the 2010s came to an end, the Chinese space program was poised to conclude the decade with an inspiring event. On December 27, 2019, after a grounding and fixture that lasted for 908 days, the Long March 5 rocket conducted a highly anticipated return-to-flight mission from Wenchang. The mission ended in full success by placing Shijian-20, the heaviest satellite China had ever built, into the intended supersynchronous orbit. The successful return of Long March 5 flight number Y3, marked an important milestone after the failure of Long March 5 flight number Y2. With this, the Long March 5 cleared the paths to multiple world-class space projects, allowing China to make great strides toward its ambitions in the coming 2020s.

== Contemporary developments (2020–present) ==
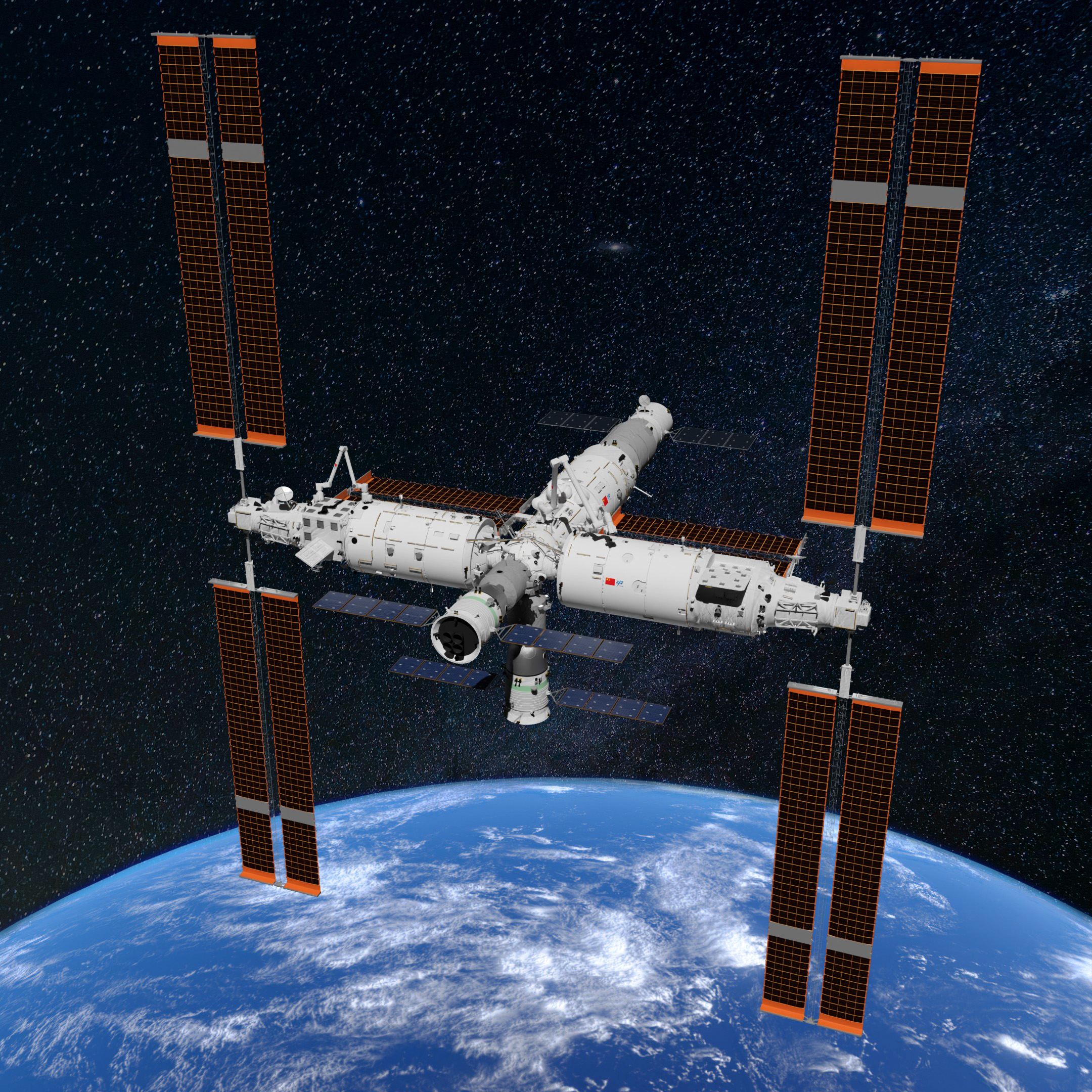
Tiangong Space Station after its completion in November, 2022.

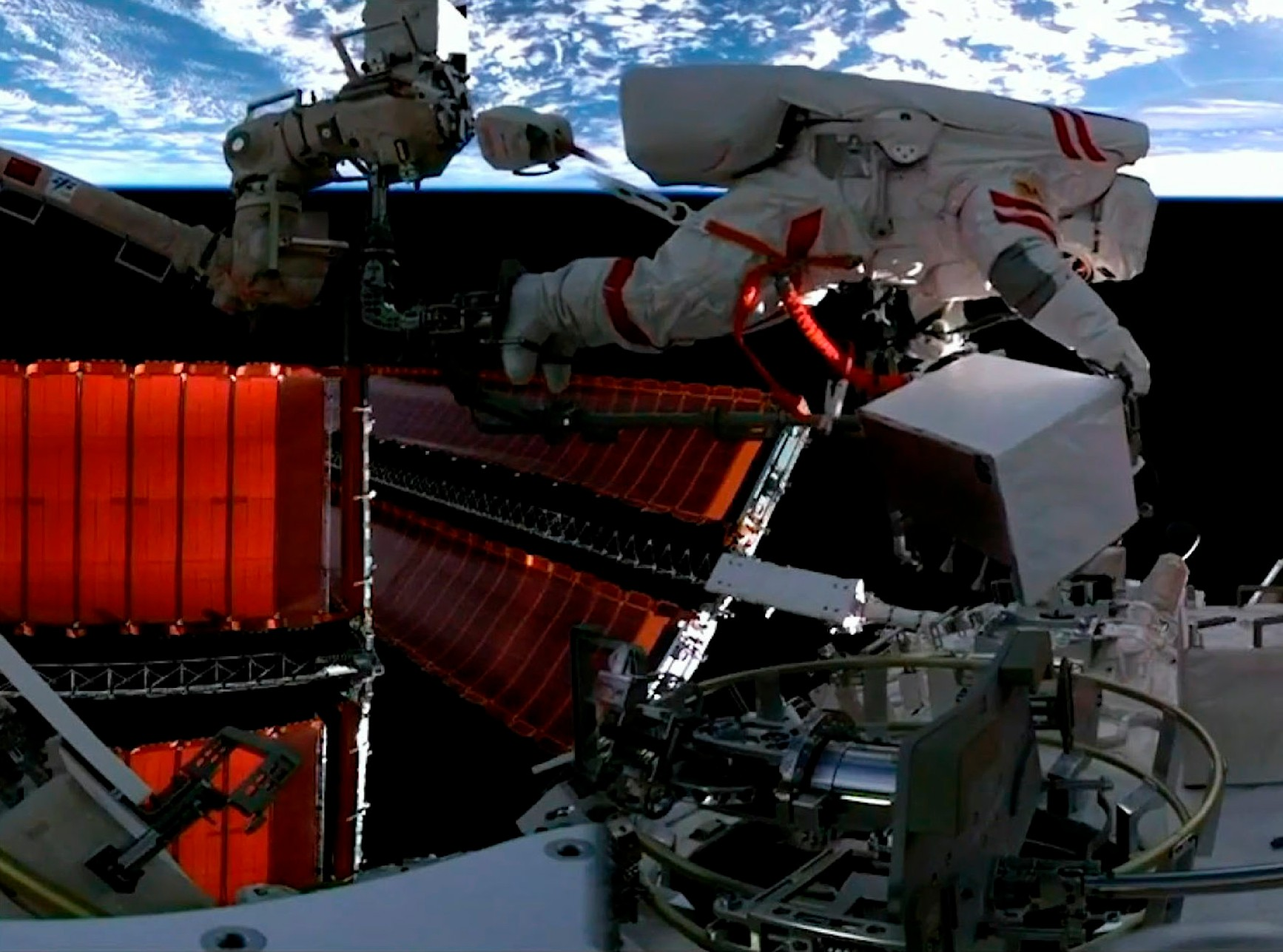
Astronaut Fei Junlong performing spacewalk on Tiangong Space Station

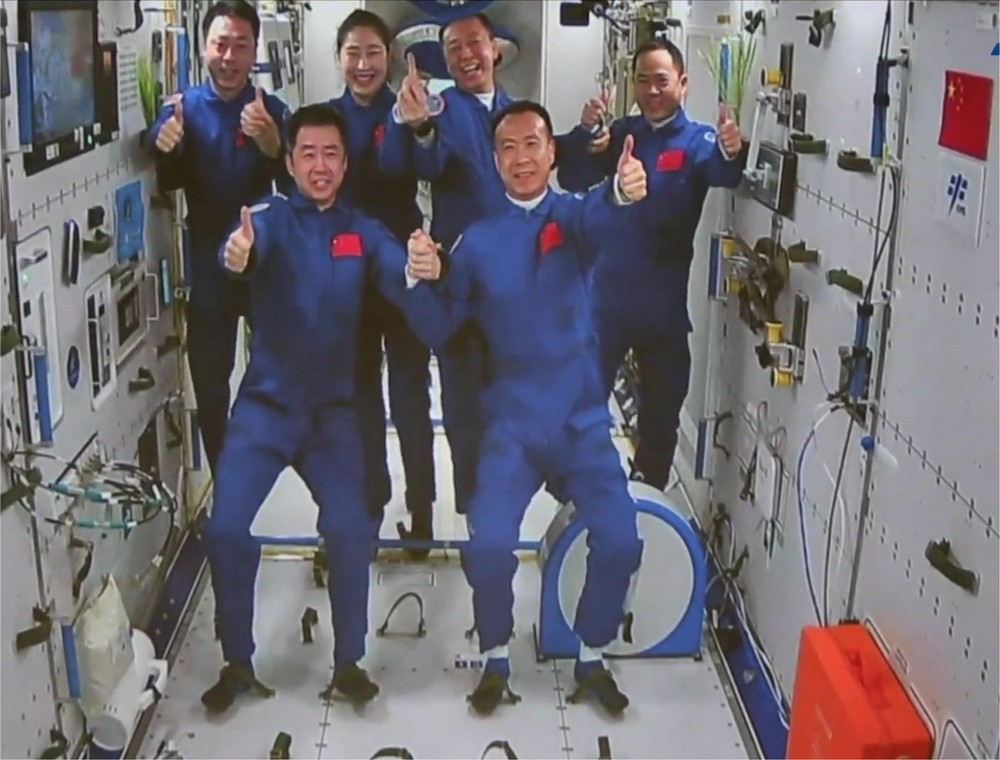
First gathering of two Chinese astronaut crews on Tiangong Space Station on November 30, 2022

Being the product of latest technology and engineering by Chinese space industry in the early 21st century, the flight-proven Long March 5 unleashed the potential of Chinese space program to a great extent. Various projects previously restricted by the mass and size limits of the payloads were now offered a chance of realization. Ever since 2020, with the help of Long March 5, the Chinese space program has made tremendous progress in multiple areas.

The "Third Step" of China Manned Space Program kicked off in 2020. Long March 5B, a variant of Long March 5, conducted its maiden flight successfully on May 5, 2020. Its high payload capacity and large payload fairing space enabled the delivery of Chinese space station modules to low Earth orbit. On April 29, 2021, Tianhe core module (天和核心舱), the 22-tonne core module of the space station, was successfully launched into Low Earth orbit by a Long March 5B rocket, marking the beginning of the construction of the China Space Station, also known as Tiangong (天宫空间站), followed by unprecedented high frequency of human spaceflight missions. A month later, China launched Tianzhou-2, the first cargo mission to the space station. On June 17, Shenzhou-12, the first crewed mission to the Chinese Space Station consisting of Nie Haisheng, Liu Boming and Tang Hongbo, was launched from Jiuquan. The crew docked with Tianhe and entered the core module about 9 hours after launch, becoming the first residents of the station. The crew lived and worked on the space station for three months, conducted two spacewalks, and returned to Earth safely on September 17, 2021. breaking the record of longest Chinese human spaceflight mission (33 days) previously made by Shenzhou-11. Roughly a month later, the Shenzhou-13 crewed was launched to the station. Astronauts Zhai Zhigang, Wang Yaping and Ye Guangfu completed the first long-duration spaceflight mission of China that lasted for over 180 days before returning to Earth safely on April 16, 2022. Astronaut Wang Yaping became the first Chinese female to perform a spacewalk during the mission.

Starting from May 2022, the China Manned Space Program had entered the space station assembly and construction phase. On June 5, 2022, Shenzhou-13 was launched and docked to Tianhe core module. The crew, including Chen Dong, Liu Yang and Cai Xuzhe, were expected to welcome the arrival of two space station modules during the six-month mission. On July 24, the third Long March 5B rocket lifted off from Wenchang, carrying the 23.2 t Wentian laboratory module (问天实验舱), the largest and heaviest spacecraft ever built and launched by China, into orbit. The module docked with the space station less than 20 hours later, adding the second module and the first laboratory module to it. On September 30, the new Wentian module was rotated from the forward docking port to starboard parking port. On October 31, the Mengtian laboratory module (梦天实验舱), the third and final module of China Space Station, was launched by another Long March 5B rocket into orbit and docked with the space station in less than 13 hours later. On November 3, the 'T-shape' China Space Station was completed after the successful transposition of the Mengtian module. On November 29, Shenzhou-15 was launched and later docked with China Space Station. Astronauts Fei Junlong, Deng Qingming, and Zhang Lu were welcomed by the Shenzhou-14 crew on board the station, completing the first crew gathering and handover in space by Chinese astronauts and starting the era of continuous Chinese astronaut presence in space.

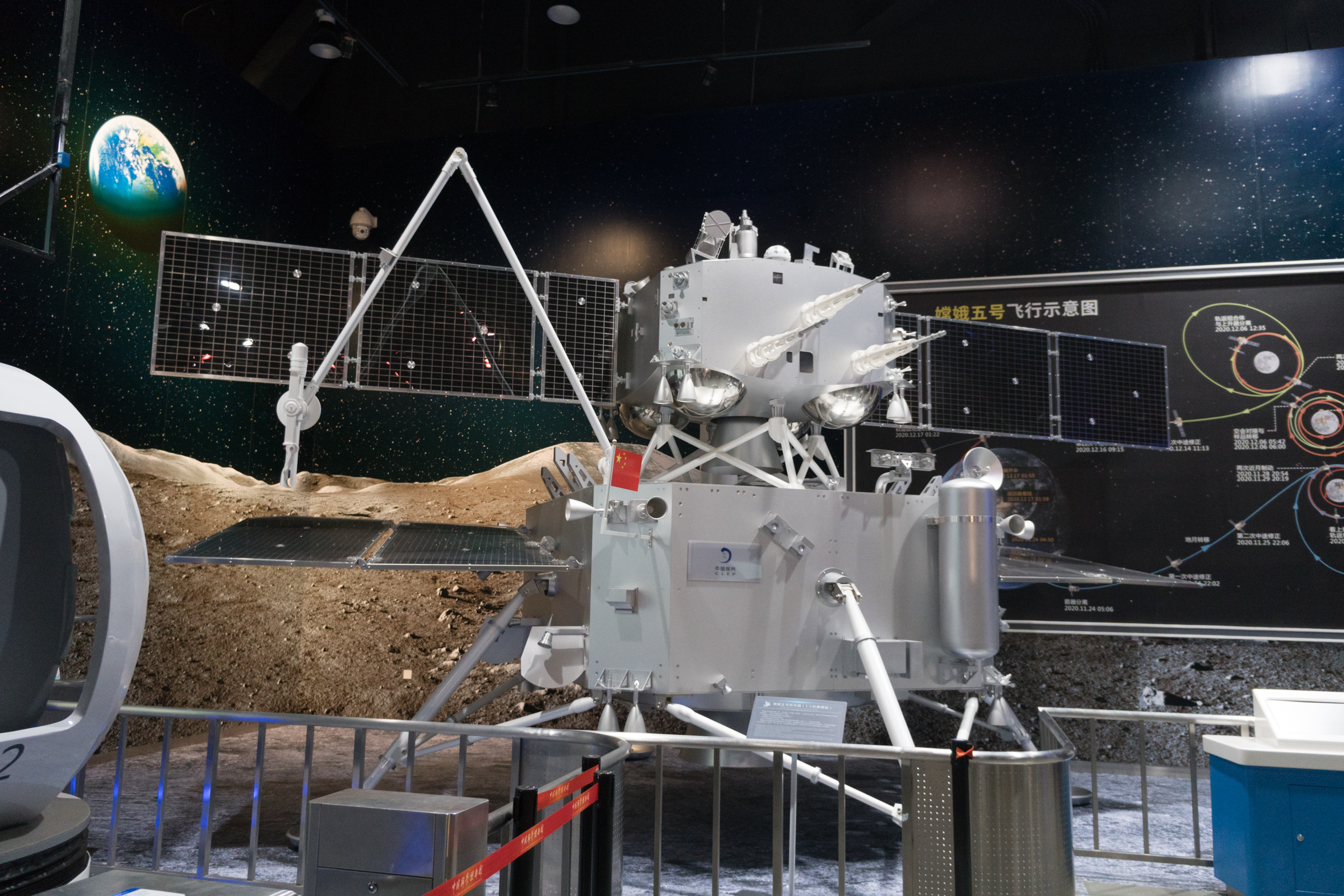
Chang'e-5 lander and ascender assembly full-scale mockup display at China Science and Technology Museum

The third phase of Chinese Lunar Exploration Program was also allowed to proceed in 2020. As preparation, China conducted Chang'e 5-T1 mission in 2014. By completing its main task on November 1, 2014, China demonstrated the capability of returning a spacecraft from the lunar orbit back to Earth safely, paving the way for the lunar sample return mission to be conducted in 2017. However, the failure of the second Long March 5 mission disrupted the original plan. Despite the readiness of the spacecraft, the mission had to be postponed due to the unavailability of its launch vehicle, until the successful return-to-flight of Long March 5 in late 2019. On November 24, 2020, the sample return mission, entitled Chang'e-5 (嫦娥五号), kicked off as the Long March 5 rocket launched the 8.2 t spacecraft stack into space. The spacecraft entered lunar orbit on November 28, followed by a separation of the stack into two parts. The lander landed near Mons Rümker in Oceanus Procellarum on December 1 and started the sample collection process the next day. Two days after the landing, on December 3, the ascent vehicle attached to the lander took off from lunar surface and entered lunar orbit, carrying the container with collected samples. This was the first time that China launched a spacecraft from an extraterrestrial body. On December 6, the ascent vehicle successfully docked with the orbiter in lunar orbit and transferred the sample container to the return capsule, accomplishing the first robotic rendezvous and docking in lunar orbit in history. On December 13, the orbiter, along with the return module, entered the orbit back to Earth after main engine burns. The return capsule eventually landed intact in Inner Mongolia on December 17, sealing the perfect completion of the mission.

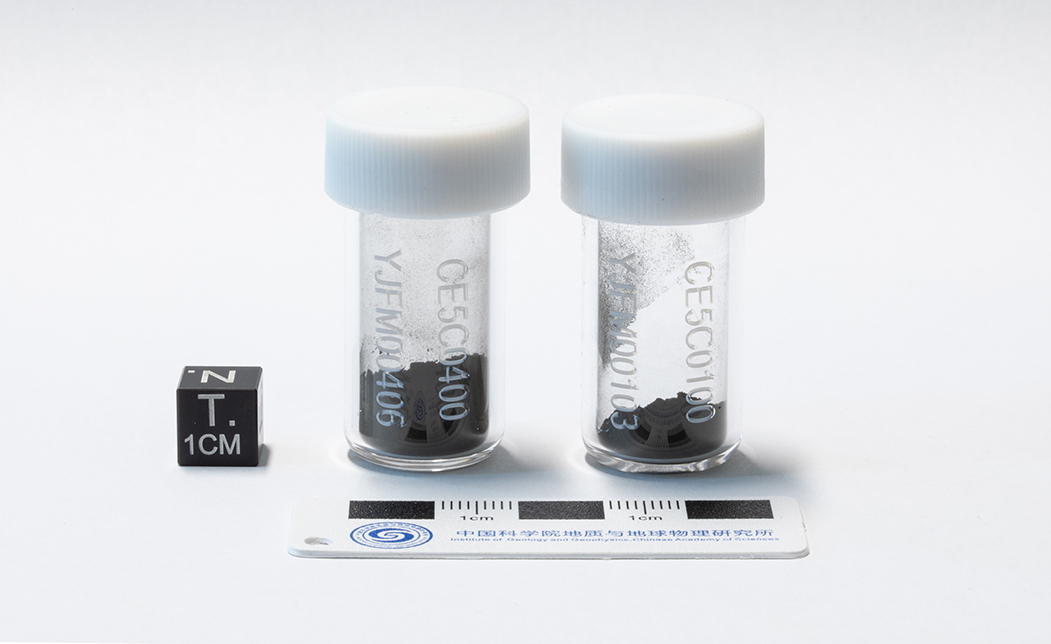
A small portion of the lunar samples retrieved by Chang'e-5

On December 19, 2020, CNSA hosted the Chang'e-5 lunar sample handover ceremony in Beijing. By weighing the sample container taken out from the return capsule, CNSA announced that Chang'e-5 retrieved 1,731 grams of samples from the Moon. Being the most complex mission completed by China at the time, the Chang'e-5 mission achieved multiple remarkable milestones, including China's first lunar sampling, first liftoff from an extraterrestrial body, first automated rendezvous and docking in lunar orbit (by any nation) and the first spacecraft carrying samples to re-enter Earth's atmosphere at high speed. Its success also marked the completion of the goal of "Orbiting, Landing, Returning" planned by CLEP since 2004.

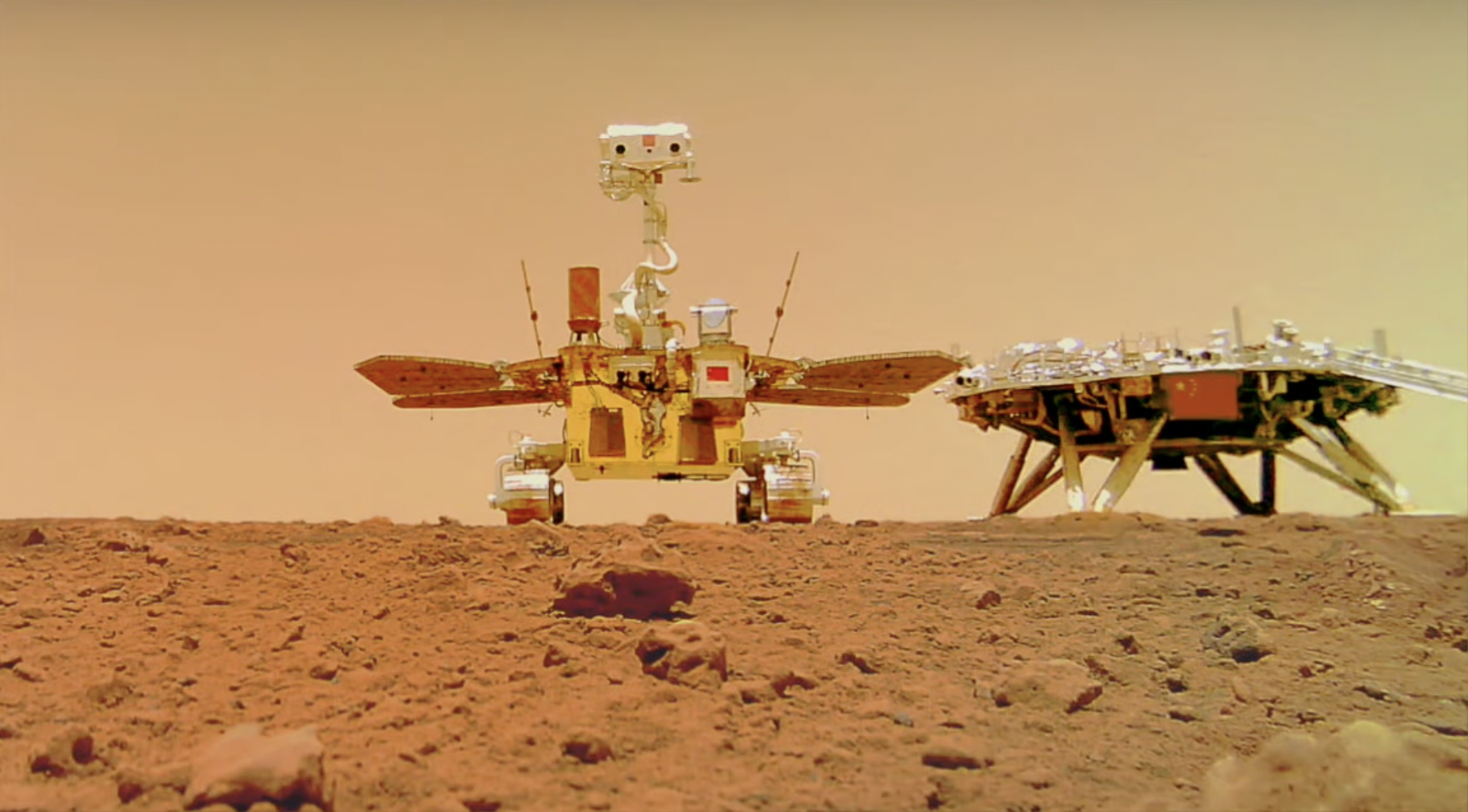
Zhurong rover group selfie with the Tianwen-1 lander taken after the successful landing.

Prior to the launch of Chang'e-5, which targeted the Moon 380,000 km away from the Earth, China's first Mars probe had departed, heading to the Mars 400 million kilometers away. Ever since the approval of the Mars mission in 2016, China had developed various technologies required, including deep space network, atmospheric entry, lander hovering and obstacle avoidance. Long March 5, the only launch vehicle capable of delivering the spacecraft, was back to service after its critical return-to-flight in December 2019. As a result, all things were ready when the launch windows of July 2020 arrived. On April 24, 2020, CNSA officially announced the program of Planetary Exploration of China and named China's first independent Mars mission as Tianwen-1 (天问一号). On July 23, 2020, Tianwen-1 was successfully launched atop a Long March 5 rocket into Trans-Mars injection orbit. The spacecraft, consisting of an orbiter, a lander, and a rover, aimed to achieve the goals of orbiting, landing, and roving on Mars in one single mission on the nation's first attempt. Due to its highly complex and risky nature, the mission was widely described as "ambitious" by international observers.

After a seven-month journey, on February 10, 2021, Tianwen-1 entered Mars orbit and became China's first operational Mars probe. The payloads on the orbiter were subsequently activated and started surveying Mars in preparation for the landing. In the following few months, CNSA released a series of images captured by the orbiter. On April 24, CNSA announced that the first Chinese Mars rover carried by Tianwen-1 probe had been named Zhurong, the god of fire in ancient Chinese mythology.

On May 15, 2020, around 1 am (Beijing time), Tianwen-1 initiated its landing process by igniting its main engines and lowering its orbit, followed by the separation of landing module at 4 am. The orbiter then returned to the parking orbit while the lander moved toward Mars atmosphere. Three hours later, the landing experienced the most dangerous atmospheric entry process that lasted for nine minutes. At 7:18 am, the lander successfully landed on the preselected southern Utopia Planitia. On May 25, the Zhurong rover drove onto the Martian surface from the lander. On June 11, CNSA released the first batch of high-resolution images of landing sites captured by Zhurong rovers, marking the success of the Mars landing mission. Being China's first independent Mars mission, Tianwen-1 completed the daunting process involving the orbiting, landing, and roving in highly sophisticated manner on one single attempt, making China the second nation to land and drive a Mars rover on the Martian surface after the United States. It drew the attention of the world as another example of China's rapidly expanding presence in outer space. Because of its huge difficulty and inspiring success, the Tianwen-1 development team received IAF World Space Award of 2022. It was the second time that a Chinese team awarded with this honor after the Chang'e-4 mission in 2019.

On 13 March, China attempted to launch two spacecrafts, DRO-A and DRO-B, into distant retrograde orbit around the Moon. As an independent project, the mission was managed by Chinese Academy of Sciences instead of Chinese Lunar Exploration Program. However, the mission failed to reach the strived for orbit due to an upper stage malfunction, remaining stranded in low Earth orbit. Rescue attempts had been made as its orbit had been observed being significantly raised to a highly elliptical orbit since its launch, yet the following status remains unknown to the public. They appear to have succeeded in reaching their desired orbit.

On 20 March 2024 China launched its relay satellite, Queqiao-2, in the orbit of the Moon, along with two mini satellites Tiandu 1 and 2. Queqiao-2 will relay communications for the Chang'e 6 (far side of the Moon), Chang'e 7 and Chang'e 8 (Lunar south pole region) spacecrafts. Tiandu 1 and 2 will test technologies for a future lunar navigation and positioning constellation. All the three probes entered lunar orbit successfully on 24 March 2024 (Tiandu-1 and 2 were attached to each other and separated in lunar orbit on 3 April 2024).

China sent Chang'e 6 on 3 May 2024, which conducted the first lunar sample return from Apollo Basin on the far side of the Moon. This is China's second lunar sample return mission, the first was achieved by Chang'e 5 from the lunar near side four years earlier. It also carried the Chinese Jinchan rover to conduct infrared spectroscopy of lunar surface and imaged Chang'e 6 lander on lunar surface. The lander-ascender-rover combination was separated with the orbiter and returner before landing on 1 June 2024 at 22:23 UTC. It landed on the Moon's surface on 1 June 2024. The ascender was launched back to lunar orbit on 3 June 2024 at 23:38 UTC, carrying samples collected by the lander, and later completed another robotic rendezvous and docking in lunar orbit. The sample container was then transferred to the returner, which landed in Inner Mongolia on 25 June 2024, completing China's far side extraterrestrial sample return mission. After dropping off the return samples for Earth, the Chang'e 6 (CE-6) orbiter was successfully captured by the Sun-Earth L2 Lagrange point on 9 September 2024.

== Near future development ==
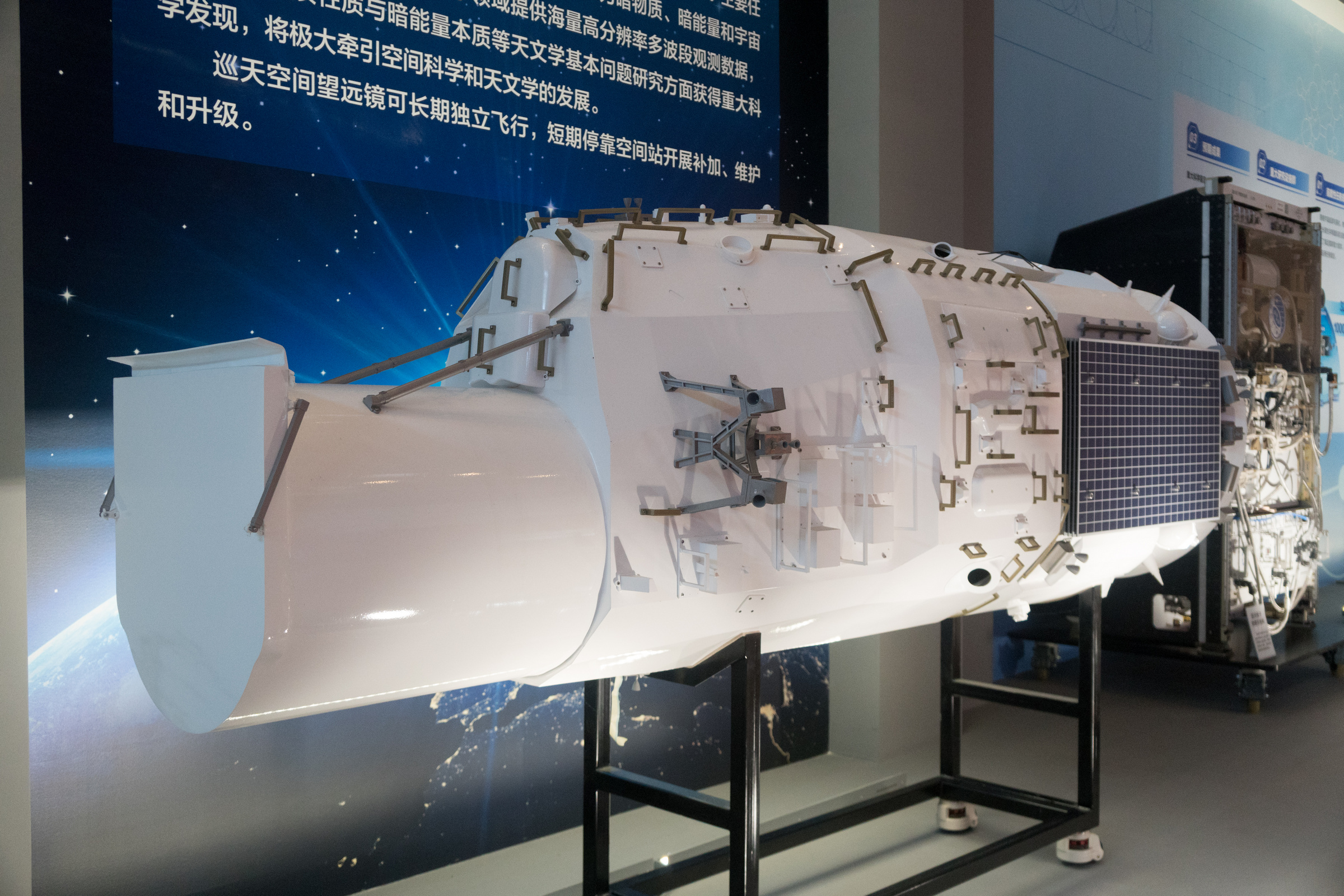
Xuntian Space Telescope mockup

According to a 2022 government white paper, China will conduct more human spaceflight, lunar and planetary exploration missions, including:

- Xuntian Space Telescope launch.
- Chang'e-7 mission to perform a precise landing in the Moon's polar region that includes a "hopping detector" to explore permanently shadowed areas.
- Chang'e-8 lunar polar mission to test in-situ resource utilization and establish the predicate for the International Lunar Research Station.
- Tianwen-2 mission to sample near-Earth asteroids and probe main-belt comets.
- Tianwen-3 mission using two launches to return samples from Mars.
- Tianwen-4 mission to explore the Jupiter system and Callisto; a probe to fly-by Uranus will be attached to the Jupiter probe.

In addition to these, China has also initiated the crewed lunar landing phase of its lunar exploration program, which aims to land Chinese astronauts on the Moon by 2030. A new crewed carrier rocket (Long March 10), new generation crew spacecraft, crewed lunar lander, lunar EVA spacesuit, lunar rover and other equipment are under development.

CNSA's Tianwen-2 was launched in May 2025, to explore the co-orbital near-Earth asteroid 469219 Kamoʻoalewa and the active asteroid 311P/PanSTARRS and collecting samples of the regolith of Kamo'oalewa.
