= Zhurong (disambiguation) =

Zhurong is the god of fire in Chinese mythology.

Zhurong, Zhu Rong, Zhu-rong, or variations may also refer to:

- Lady Zhurong, a fictional character from the novel Romance of the Three Kingdoms, also featured in derivative properties such as Dynasty Warriors and Total War
- Zhurong (rover), a Mars rover of CNSA which landed in 2021 as part of the Tianwen-1 mission

== See also ==
- Yan Rongzhu (born 1952), a Chinese politician
- Erzhu Rong (493–530), a Chinese general
- Zhu Rong (disambiguation)
- Zhu (disambiguation)
- Rong (disambiguation)
- Zurong (disambiguation)
