= Zurong =

Zurong, Zu Rong, Zu-rong, or, variation, may refer to:

== People ==
- Guo Zurong (born 1928), a Chinese musician
- Hu Zurong, a Chinese pole vaulter, athlete, and disability sports administrator
- Wu Zurong (吴祖荣), Chinese ambassador to Vanuatu

=== Fictional characters ===
- Yang Zu-Rong (楊祖榮), a fictional character from King Flower (金大花的華麗冒險)

== Other uses ==
- Zurong, Debao County (Chinese: 足荣镇), Debao County, Guangxi, China; a town; see List of township-level divisions of Guangxi

== See also ==
- Zhurong (disambiguation)
- Rong (disambiguation)
- Zu (disambiguation)
