= Zhu Rong =

Zhu Rong may refer to:

- Lady Zhurong (祝融), character in Romance of the Three Kingdoms
- Rong Zhu (茸主), mixed martial artist born 2000
- Zhurong (祝融), mythical figure

== See also ==
- Zhurong (disambiguation)
