= Rong =

Rong or RONG may refer to:

== Places ==
=== China ===
- Rong County, Guangxi, Yulin, Guangxi, China
- Rong County, Sichuan, Zigong, Sichuan, China

=== Nepal ===
- Rong, Ilam, a rural municipality in Ilam District, Nepal

=== Norway ===
- Rong, Norway, a village in Øygarden municipality in Vestland county
- Rongøy, an island in Øygarden municipality in Vestland county

== People ==
- Consort Rong (Kangxi) (died 1727), a consort of the Kangxi Emperor
- Consort Rong (Qianlong) (1734–1788), a consort of the Qianlong Emperor, China
- Prince Rong (1644–1912), a peerage during the Manchu-led Qing dynasty, China
- Rong (surname)
- Several ancient Chinese nomadic people
  - Xirong (西戎), West Rong
  - Shanrong (山戎), Mountain Rong
  - Quanrong (犬戎), Dog Rong

== Other uses ==
- Róng or Lepcha script
- Rong (crater), on Mars
- Rồng, a Vietnamese dragon

== See also ==
- Rong County (disambiguation)
- Rong River (disambiguation)
- Rongan (disambiguation)
