= Rong River =

Rong River may refer to:

- Rong River (Guangdong), China
- Rong River (Guangxi), China
- Rong River (Tibet), China, a tributary of the Arun River

== See also ==
- Rong (disambiguation)
