= Utopia Planitia =

Impact basin on Mars

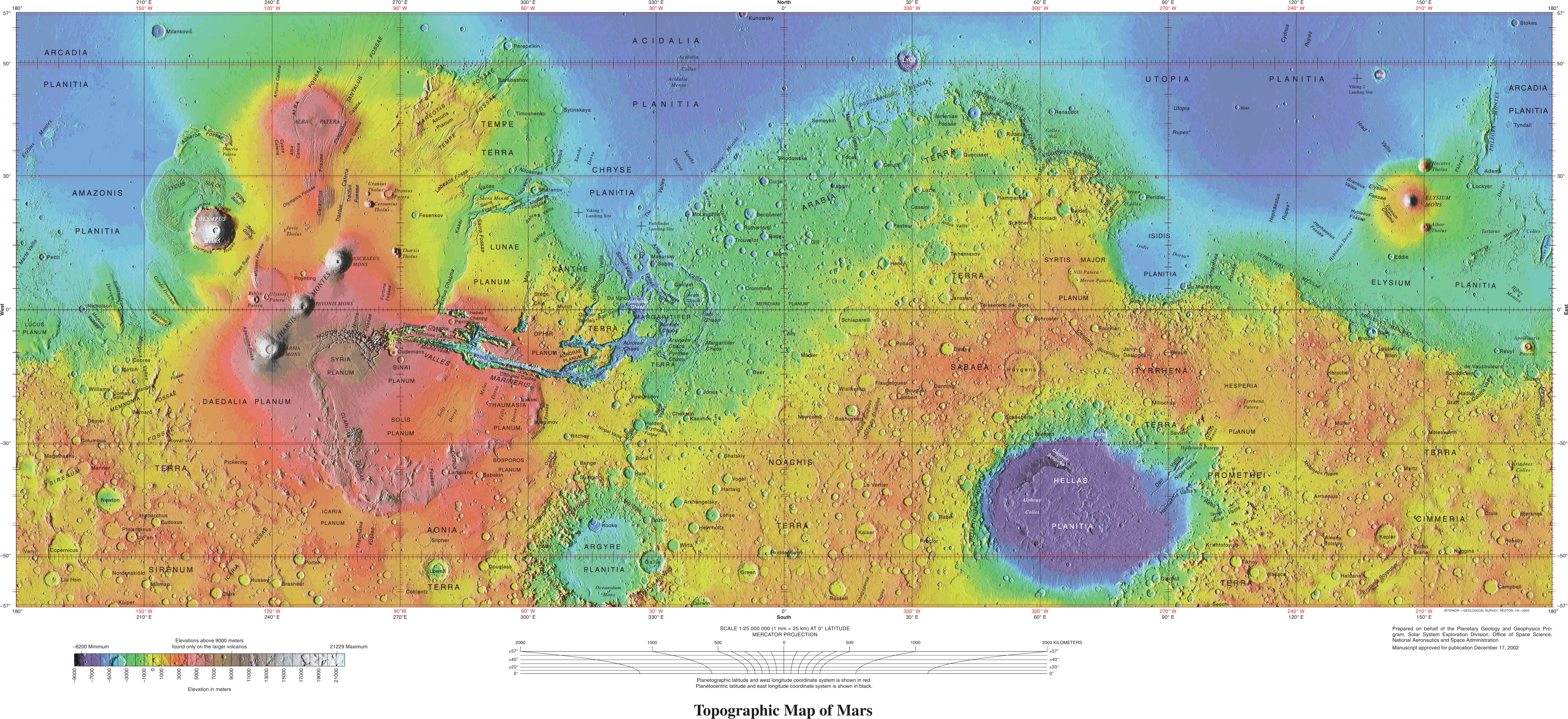
- Map of the lower and mid-latitudes of Mars, with Utopia visible in dark blue in the top right
- Location: Mars
- Coordinates: 46.7°N 117.5°E
- Diameter: c. 3,300 km (2,100 mi)
- Impactor diameter: c. 550 km
- Age: c. 4.2 billion years

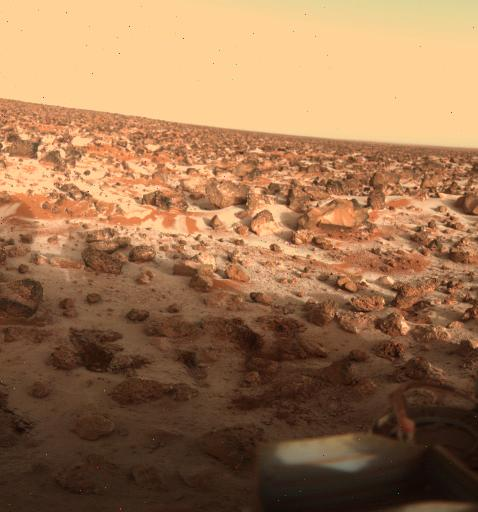
Frosted terrain on Utopia Planitia, taken by the Viking 2 lander in 1979

Utopia Planitia (Greek and Latin: "Utopia Land Plain") is a large plain within Utopia, the largest recognized impact basin on Mars (Note: Officially, Utopia is an albedo feature.) and in the Solar System with an estimated diameter of 3,300 km (2,100 mi). It is the Martian region where the Viking 2 lander touched down and began exploring on September 3, 1976, and the Zhurong rover touched down on May 14, 2021, as a part of the Tianwen-1 mission. It is located at the antipode of Argyre Planitia, centered at 46.7°N 117.5°E. It is also in the Casius quadrangle, Amenthes quadrangle, and the Cebrenia quadrangle of Mars. The region is in the broader North Polar/Borealis Basin that covers most of the Northern Hemisphere of Mars.

The Utopia basin is estimated to have formed around 4.3-4.1 billion years ago. The impactor was likely around 400–700 kilometres (250–430 mi) in diameter. The basin was subsequently mostly filled in, resulting in a mascon (a strong positive gravity anomaly) detectable by orbiting satellites.

Many rocks at Utopia Planitia appear perched, as if wind removed much of the soil at their bases. A hard surface crust is formed by solutions of minerals moving up through soil and evaporating at the surface. Some areas of the surface exhibit scalloped topography, a surface that looks like it was carved out by an ice cream scoop. This surface is thought to have formed by the degradation of an ice-rich permafrost. Many features that look like pingos on the Earth are found in Utopia Planitia (~35–50° N; ~80–115° E).

On November 22, 2016, NASA reported finding a large amount of underground ice in the Utopia Planitia region. The volume of water detected has been estimated to be equivalent to the volume of water in Lake Superior.

In 2026, research was published that showed a sort of "bathtub ring" in parts of Utopia. This was interpreted to be deposits of Manganese oxides that were deposited by an ocean. Manganese oxides can act as marker for past oceans, especially around ancient water-air boundaries. Manganese minerals react easily with oxygen. In oxygen-poor water, manganese remains in its dissolved, soluble form. But, when oxygen becomes available it is oxidized into insoluble solid oxides, which can become signatures of water activity. The team involved analyzed short-wave infrared (SWIR) data from China's Zhurong rover, ESA's OMEGA orbiter and NASA's CRISM orbiter to map the Manganese (hydr)oxides. They estimated that the ocean lasted around 0.8–1.5 million years.

== Scalloped topography ==
Utopia Planitia
Scalloped terrain led to the discovery of a large amount of underground ice
enough water to fill Lake Superior

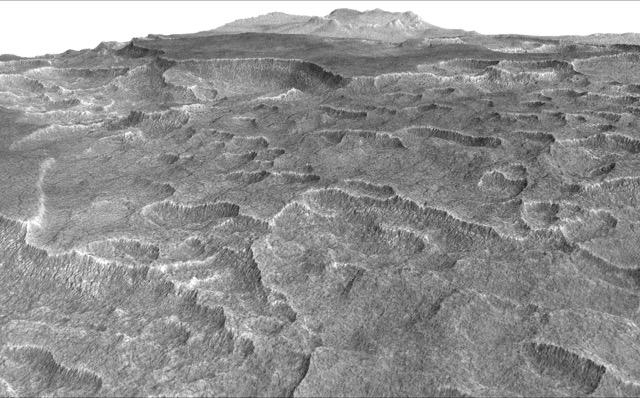
Martian terrain

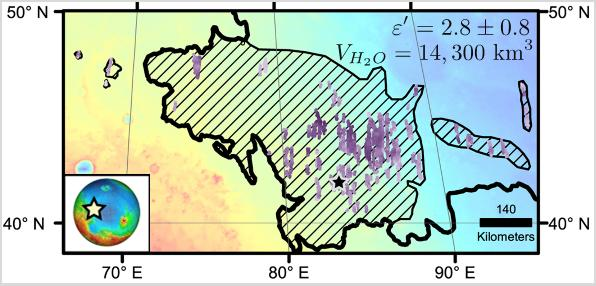
Map of terrain

Scalloped topography is common in the mid-latitudes of Mars, between 45° and 60° north and south. It is particularly prominent in the region of Utopia Planitia in the northern hemisphere and in the region of Peneus and Amphitrites Patera in the southern hemisphere. Such topography consists of shallow, rimless depressions with scalloped edges, commonly referred to as scalloped depressions or simply scallops. Scalloped depressions can be isolated or clustered and sometimes seem to coalesce. A typical scalloped depression displays a gentle equator-facing slope and a steeper pole-facing scarp. This topographic asymmetry is probably due to differences in insolation. Scalloped depressions are believed to form from the removal of subsurface material, possibly interstitial ice, by sublimation. This process may still be happening at present.

== In popular culture ==
In the Star Trek media franchise, Utopia Planitia—both on Mars's surface and a space station in areosynchronous orbit above it—is the site of a major United Federation of Planets shipyard, the Utopia Planitia Fleet Yards. Ships such as the USS Enterprise-D, USS Defiant, USS Voyager, and USS Sao Paulo were built there.

== See also ==
- Hellas Planitia - largest exposed (2,300 km across) Martian impact crater
- Isidis Planitia large (1,900 km across) Martian impact crater
- Argyre Planitia large (1,700 km across) Martian impact crater
- Glaciers on Mars
- Geography of Mars
- List of plains on Mars
- Scalloped topography
