= Yinghuo-1 =

Chinese Mars orbiter, never left Earth orbit

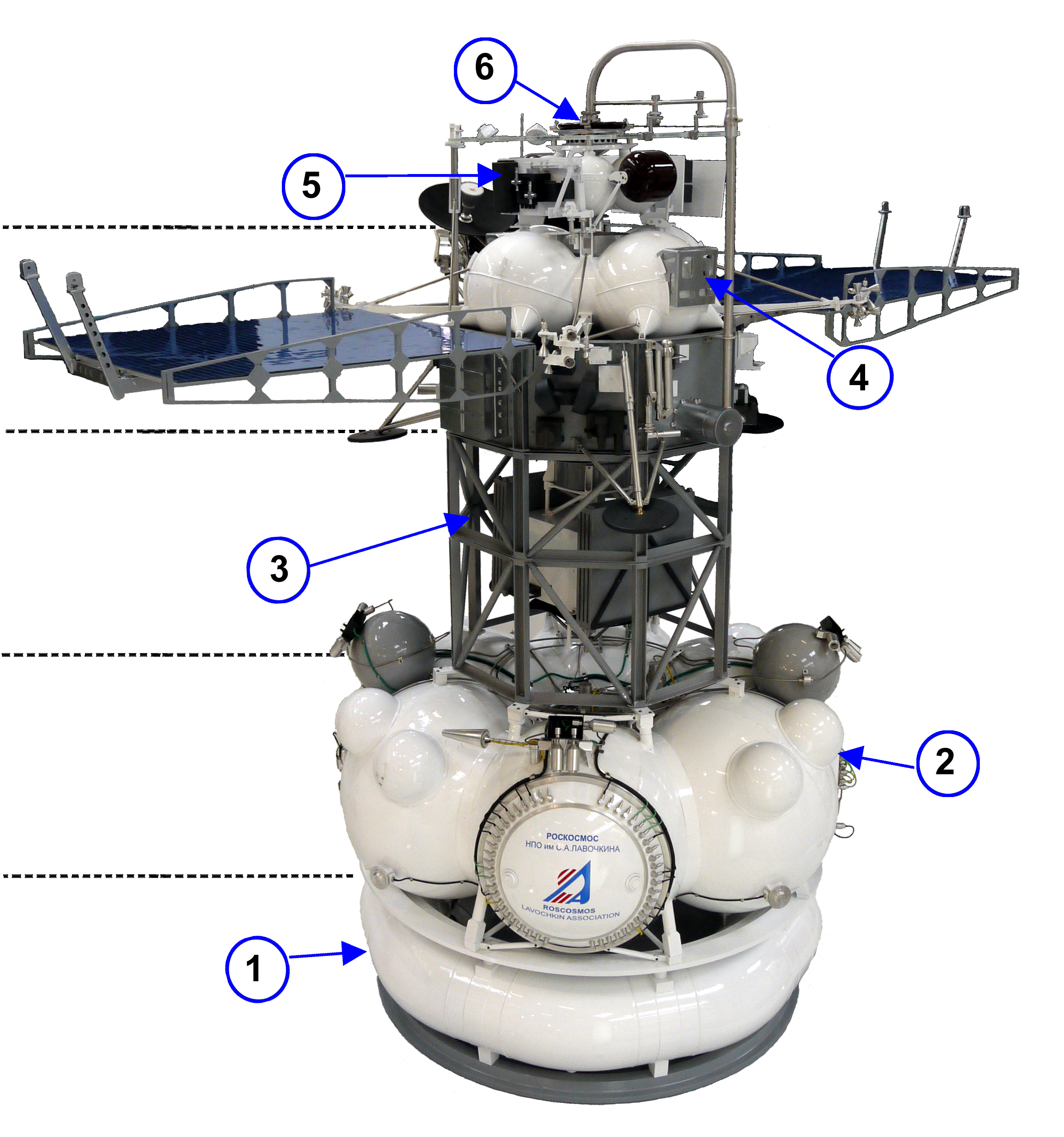
- Yinghuo-1 marked label 3
- Mission type: Mars orbiter
- Operator: CNSA
- Mission duration: 1 year in Mars orbit (planned); Never departed Earth orbit

Spacecraft properties
- Launch mass: 115 kilograms (254 lb)
- Dimensions: 750mm x 750mm x 650mm (stowed)
- Power: 90 W, solar array

Start of mission
- Launch date: 8 November 2011, 20:16:03 UTC
- Rocket: Zenit-2M
- Launch site: Baikonur 45/1
- Deployed from: Fobos-Grunt (planned)

End of mission
- Decay date: 15 January 2012

Orbital parameters
- Reference system: Areocentric (planned); Geocentric (achieved)
- Regime: Low Earth (achieved)
- Perigee altitude: 800 kilometres (500 mi) (planned)
- Apogee altitude: 80,000 kilometres (50,000 mi) (planned)
- Inclination: 5 degrees (planned)
- Period: 3 days (planned)

Yinghuo-1 (simplified Chinese: 萤火一号; traditional Chinese: 螢火一號; pinyin: Yínghuǒ yī hào) was a Chinese Mars-exploration space probe, intended to be the first Chinese planetary space probe and the first Chinese spacecraft to orbit Mars. It was launched from Baikonur Cosmodrome, Kazakhstan, on 8 November 2011, along with the Russian Fobos-Grunt sample return spacecraft, which was intended to visit Mars's moon Phobos. The 115-kg (250-lb) Yinghuo-1 probe was intended by the CNSA to orbit Mars for about two years, studying the planet's surface, atmosphere, ionosphere and magnetic field. Shortly after launch, Fobos-Grunt was expected to perform two burns to depart Earth orbit bound for Mars. However, these burns did not take place, leaving both probes stranded in orbit. On 17 November 2011, CNSA reported that Yinghuo-1 had been declared lost. After a period of orbital decay, Yinghuo-1 and Fobos-Grunt underwent destructive re-entry on 15 January 2012, finally disintegrating over the Pacific Ocean.

As a result, CNSA subsequently moved to embark on an independent Mars exploration program, which culminated in the Tianwen-1 orbiter-lander-rover mission that successfully landed the Zhurong rover on Mars on 22 May, 2021.

== Name ==
Yinghuo-1's name (simplified Chinese: 萤火; traditional Chinese: 螢火; pinyin: yínghuǒ; lit. 'luminous fire'; trans. "firefly") was a tribute to the near-homophone yínghuò (荧惑; 熒惑). This word, a short form of "shimmering planet" (熒惑星; yínghuò xīng), is an ancient Chinese name for Mars.

== Background ==
On 26 March 2007, the director of the China National Space Administration, Sun Laiyan, and the head of the Russian Space Agency, Anatoly Perminov, signed a landmark space co-operation accord, entitled the "Cooperative Agreement between the China National Space Administration and the Russian Space Agency on joint Chinese-Russian exploration of Mars". One stipulation of the agreement was the construction and launch of the Yinghuo Mars orbiter and its Russian counterpart, Fobos-Grunt.

== Instruments and objectives ==
Yinghuo-1's primary scientific objectives were:

1. To conduct detailed investigation of the plasma environment and magnetic field around Mars.
2. To study Martian ion escape processes and their possible mechanisms
3. To conduct ionosphere occultation measurements between Yinghuo-1 and Fobos-Grunt, focusing on the sub-solar and midnight regions.
4. To observe sandstorms on the Martian surface.

The probe's science payload consisted of four instrument:

1. A plasma package, consisting of an electron analyzer, ion analyzer and mass spectrometer.
2. A fluxgate magnetometer.
3. A radio-occultation sounder.
4. An optical imaging system consisting of two cameras with 200 m (660 ft) resolution for high-quality images of the Martian surface to be captured from orbit.

== Mission profile ==
Diagram showing Yinghuo-1's intended approach pathway to Mars.

Following its transit to Mars, Yinghuo-1 was planned to separate from Fobos-Grunt in October 2012 and enter a 72.8-hour equatorial Martian orbit, with an orbital inclination of approximately 5 degrees. Fobos-Grunt and Yinghuo-1 would have conducted Mars ionosphere occultation experiments together, although Fobos-Grunt's primary objective was to obtain surface samples from the Martian moon Phobos. Yinghuo-1 would have experienced periods of up to 8.8 hours in darkness when its orbit carried it over Mars's nightside; it would have run on battery power during these periods, as its solar panels would have been unusable without direct sunlight.

=== Launch processing ===
On 17 October 2011, the completed Yinghuo-1 satellite arrived at Baikonur Cosmodrome with Fobos-Grunt, beginning payload processing operations in preparation for its November launch.

=== Launch and orbital burn failure ===
China's Yinghuo-1 and the Russian Fobos-Grunt spacecraft were launched together aboard a Ukrainian Zenit rocket with a Fregat upper stage from Baikonur Cosmodrome, Kazakhstan, on 8 November 2011. Shortly after launch, Fobos-Grunt was expected to perform two burns to depart Earth orbit and begin its journey to Mars. However, these burns did not take place, stranding the two spacecraft in their parking orbit. Despite repeated efforts to contact the launcher and rectify the problem, the spacecraft continued to lose altitude. On 17 November, Chinese state media formally declared the Yinghuo-1 probe lost, and the launcher's orbit gradually began to decay.

=== Destructive re-entry ===
On 14 January 2012, it was reported that Fobos-Grunt and Yinghuo-1 were beginning their final descent into Earth's atmosphere, falling at a rate of several hundred metres per hour from their 147-kilometre (91 mi) orbital altitude. The two spacecraft completed their re-entry and disintegrated over the Pacific Ocean on 15 January 2012.

== Specifications ==
- Length: 0.75 metres (2.5 ft) (excluding solar panels).
- Width: 0.75 metres (2.5 ft).
- Height: 0.6 metres (2.0 ft).
- Mass: 115 kilograms (254 lb).
- Power: 3-axis stabilised, 2×3 section solar array with a full-extended length of 5.6 metres (18 ft), providing average power of 90 W, and peak power of 180 W.
- HGA: 950 mm antenna dish (S-band) with a 12 W transmitter in two frequencies (8.4 and 7.17 GHz) and a data rate between 8 bit/s and 16 kbit/s.
- LGA: 80 bit/s data rate.

== See also ==
- China National Space Administration (CNSA)
- Chinese space program
  - Chinese Lunar Exploration Program – Lunar research program (2004–present)
  - Planetary Exploration of China
  - Tianwen-1 – 2020 Interplanetary mission by China to place an orbiter, lander, and rover on Mars
- List of missions to Mars
