= Zhurong (rover) =

Chinese rover on Mars

- 祝融
- Part of Tianwen-1
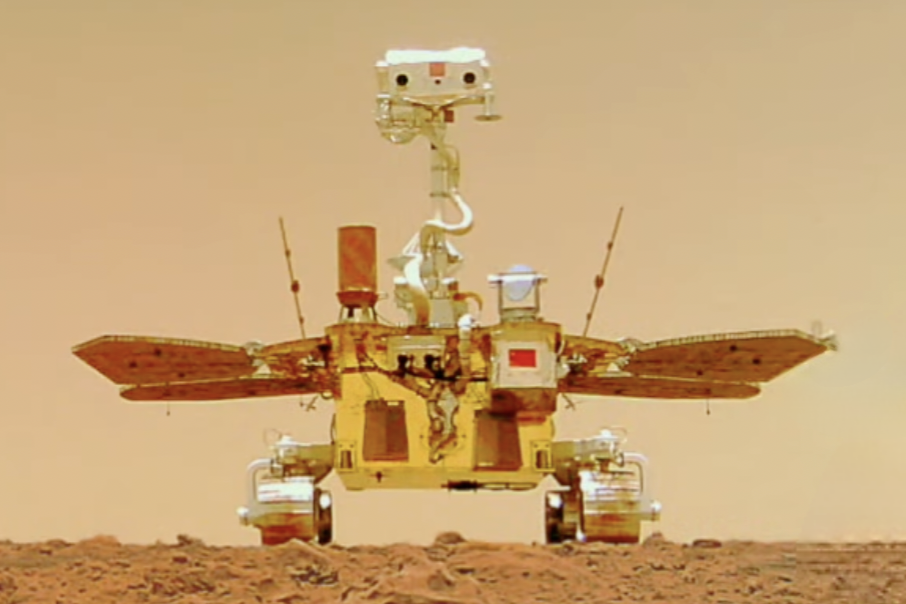
- Zhurong selfie with lander, taken by the deployable Tianwen-1 remote camera.
- Type: Mars rover
- Eponym: Zhurong
- Owner: CNSA
- Manufacturer: China Academy of Space Technology

Specifications
- Dimensions: 2.6 m × 3 m × 1.85 m (8 ft 6 in × 9 ft 10 in × 6 ft 1 in)
- Launch mass: 240 kilograms (530 lb)
- Power: Solar arrays
- Rocket: Long March 5

Instruments
- MarSCoDe; MCS; MSCam; NaTeCam; RoMAG; RoPeR

History
- Launched: 23 July 2020, 23:18 UTC; from Wenchang LC-101
- Deployed: 22 May 2021, 02:40 UTC; from Tianwen-1 lander
- Location: 25.102°N 109.914°E; Utopia Planitia, Mars
- Travelled: 1,921 m (6,302 ft) on Mars as of 5 May 2022

Zhurong (Chinese: 祝融; pinyin: Zhùróng) is a Chinese rover on Mars, the country's first to land on another planet after it previously landed two rovers on the Moon. The rover is part of the Tianwen-1 mission to Mars conducted by the China National Space Administration (CNSA).

The spacecraft was launched on 23 July 2020 and inserted into Martian orbit on 10 February 2021. The lander, carrying the rover, performed a soft landing on Mars on 14 May 2021, making China the third country to successfully soft-land a spacecraft on Mars and the second one to deploy a rover on Mars that is transmitting, after the United States. (Note: The Soviet Mars-3 was the first spacecraft to achieve soft landing and land a rover, but did not transmit any deployment results) Zhurong was deployed on 22 May 2021, 02:40 UTC.

Designed for a lifespan of 90 sols (93 Earth days), Zhurong was active for more than 347 sols (358 days) after its deployment on Mars's surface. The rover entered a planned hibernation on 18 May 2022 due to approaching sandstorms and Martian winter. With appropriate temperature and sunlight conditions, Zhurong was expected to wake up in December 2022 but never did due to excessive dust accumulation, according to the rover's chief designer.

== Name ==
Zhurong is named after a Chinese mytho-historical figure usually associated with fire and light, as Mars is called "the Planet of Fire" (Chinese: 火星) in China and some other countries in East Asia. It was selected by a public online vote held between 20 January 2021 and 28 February 2021, with Zhurong ranking first with 504,466 votes. The name was chosen with the meanings of "igniting the fire of interstellar exploration in China" and "to symbolize the Chinese people's determination to explore the stars and to uncover unknowns in the universe".

== History ==
China began its first interplanetary exploration attempt in 2011 by sending Yinghuo-1, a Mars orbiter, in a joint mission with Russia. It did not leave Earth orbit due to a failure of the Russian launch vehicle. As a result, CNSA then began work on an independent Mars mission.

The first early model of the future Mars rover was on display in November 2014 at the 10th China International Aviation & Aerospace Exhibition. It had an appearance similar to the Yutu lunar rover, which had deployed on the Moon.

On 22 April 2016, Xu Dazhe, head of the CNSA, announced that the Mars mission had been approved on 11 January 2016. A probe would be sent to Martian orbit and attempt to land on Mars in 2020.

On 23 August 2016, CNSA revealed the first images of the final version of the Mars mission spacecraft, which confirmed the composition of a Mars orbiter, lander, and rover in one mission.

The scientific objectives and payloads of the Mars mission were declared in a paper published in Journal of Deep Space Exploration in December 2017.

On 24 April 2020, China's interplanetary exploration program was formally announced by CNSA, along with the name Tianwen and an emblem of the program. The first mission of the program, the Mars mission to be carried out in 2020, was named Tianwen-1.

On 24 April 2021, in anticipation of the upcoming landing attempt, CNSA formally announced that the rover would be named Zhurong (Chinese: 祝融号).

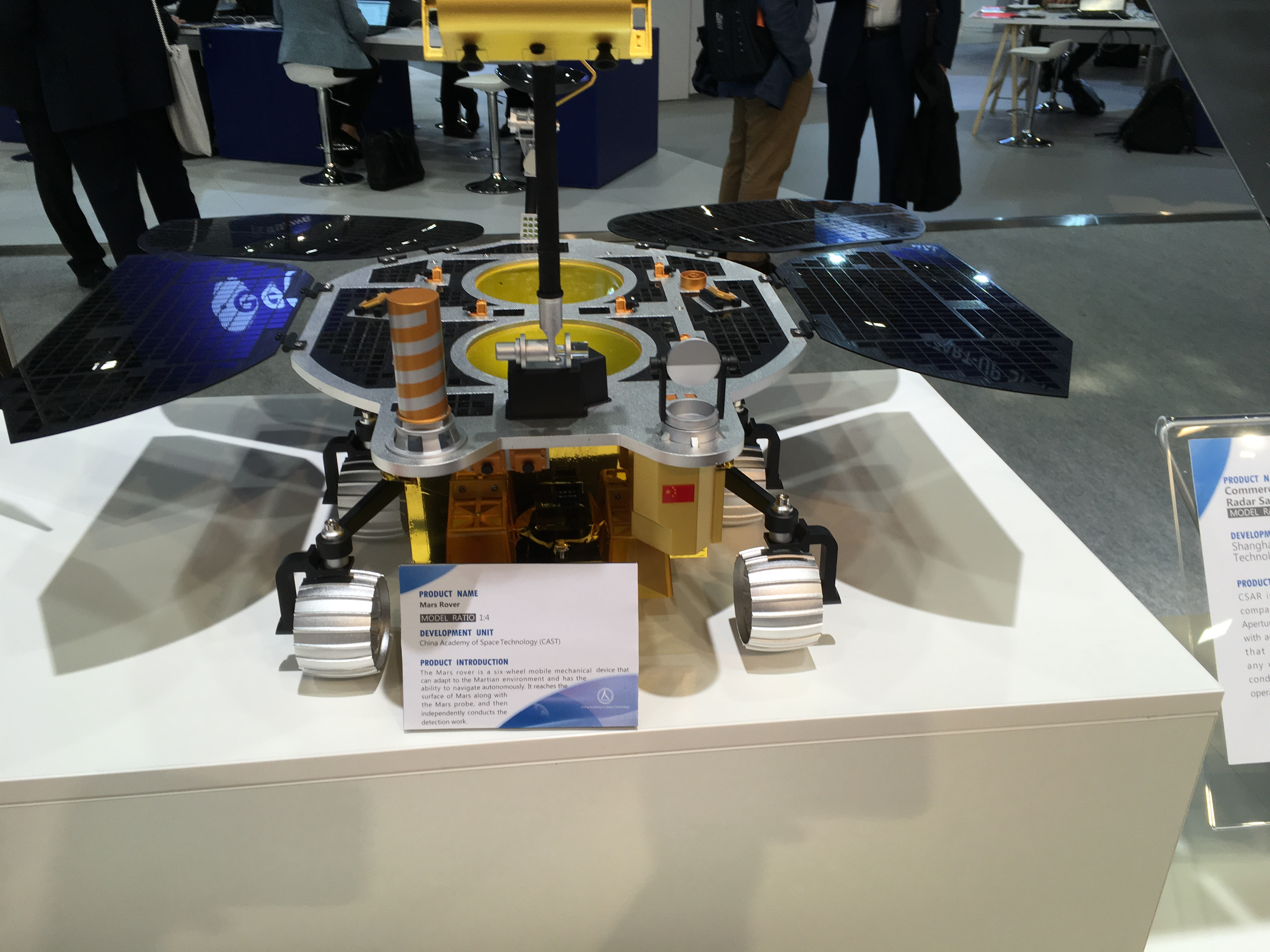
Mockup of the Zhurong rover at the 69th International Astronautical Congress

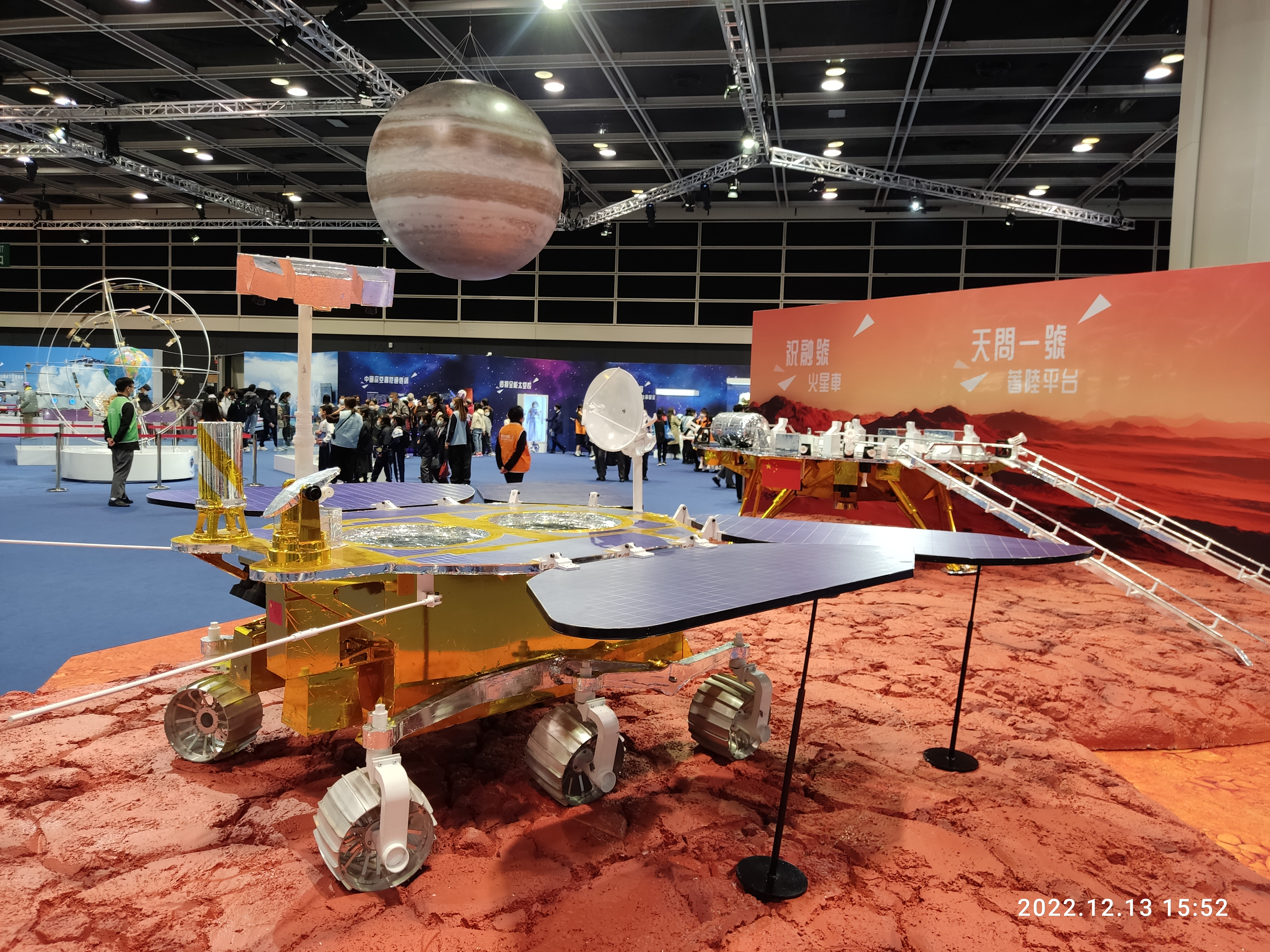
Full-scale mockup of Zhurong rover and Tianwen-1 lander.

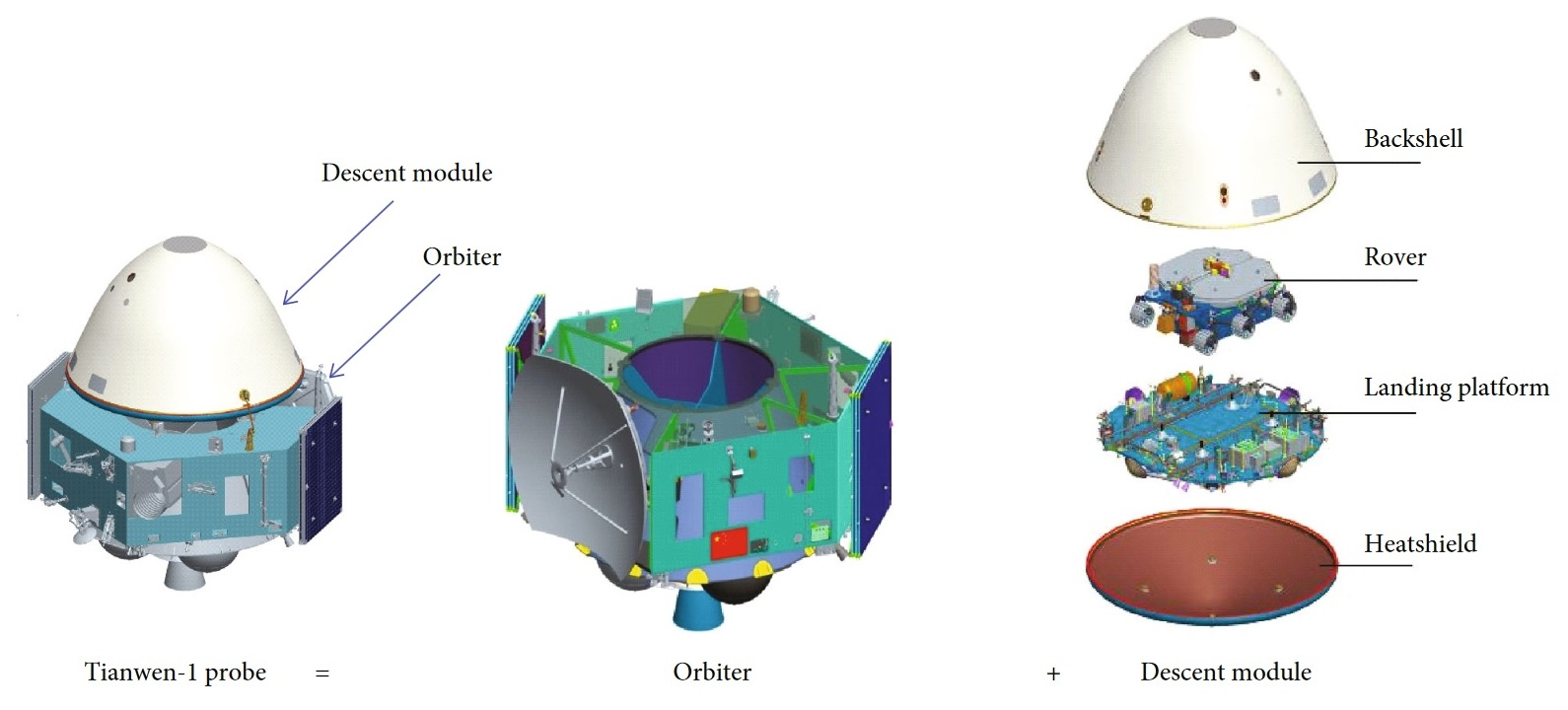
Artist's Rendering of Tianwen-1 mission components

=== Test Rover ===
To design and test the rover and simulate conditions at Utopia Planitia, CNSA kept a test bed rover in a Mars yard at the China Academy of Space Technology in Beijing. The Field Test Rover (FTR) was made two years before the actual Zhurong was built, and some of the FTR components were used in the vehicle flown to Mars. The FTR completed thousands of tests on the ground before the start of the mission. The twin remained in service to help scientists and engineers determine the path for Zhurong by testing maneuvers in the Mars yard.

== Landing area selection ==
The landing area was determined based on two criteria:

- Engineering feasibility, including latitude, altitude, slope, surface condition, rock distribution, local wind speed, visibility requirements during the EDL process.
- Scientific objectives, including geology, soil structure and water ice distribution, surface elements, mineral, and rock distribution, magnetic field detection.

Two areas were preselected in the next stage: Chryse Planitia and Utopia Planitia.

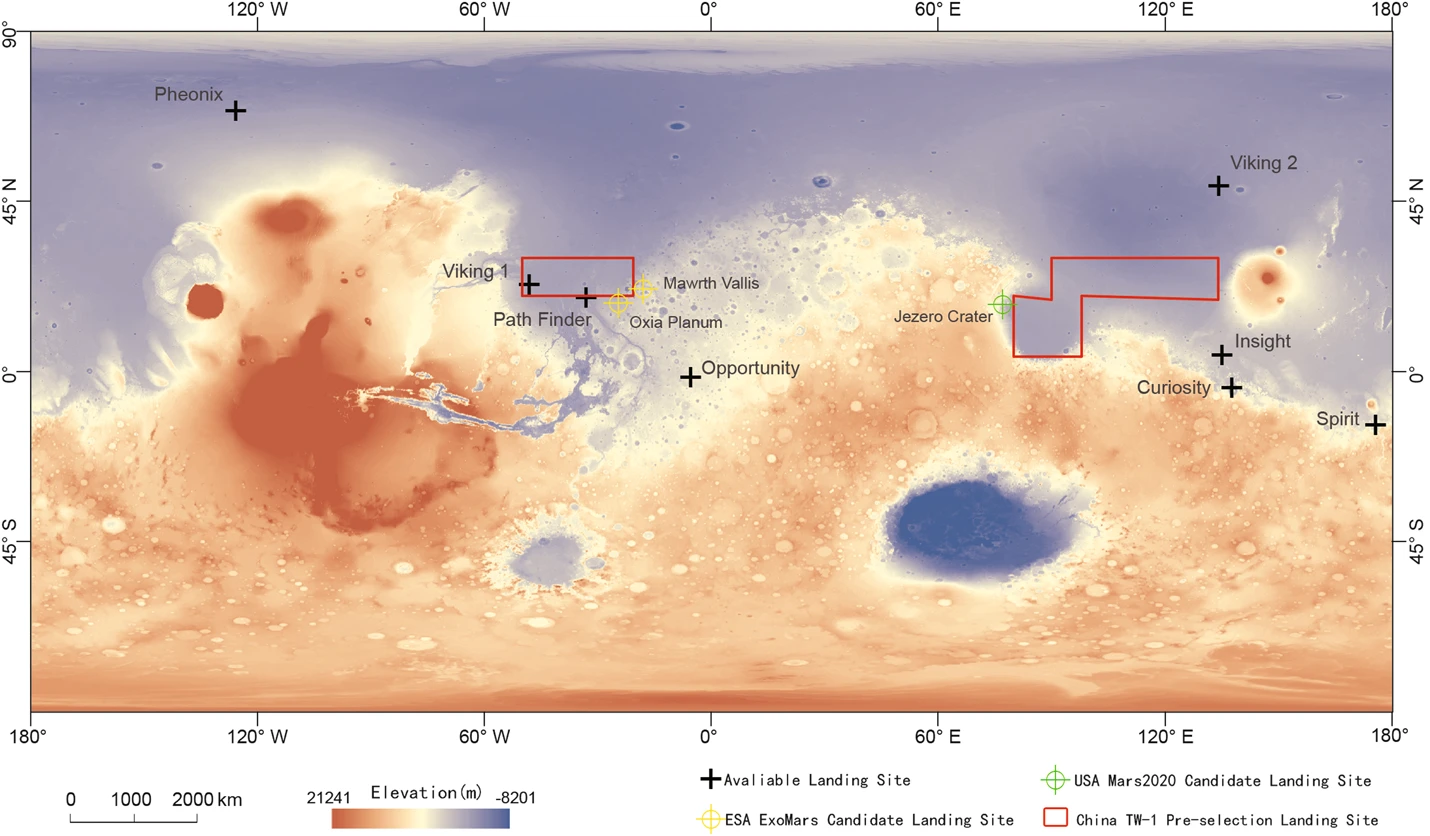
The two landing site candidates of Tianwen-1 mission are enclosed by red lines on Martian map. The one on the left is located in Chryse Planitia and the one on the right in Utopia Planitia.

The candidate in Utopia Planitia was favored by the team due to higher chances of finding evidence for whether an ancient ocean existed on the northern part of Mars. It was eventually selected as the final landing area of the mission.

== Mission timeline ==
Tianwen-1, along with Zhurong rover, was launched at 12:41 UTC+8 on 23 July 2020, from the Wenchang Spacecraft Launch Site by a Long March 5 heavy-lift rocket.

After a 202-day journey through interplanetary space, Tianwen-1 inserted itself into Martian orbit on 10 February 2021, thereby becoming China's first Mars orbiter. Subsequently, it performed several orbital maneuvers and began surveying target landing sites on Mars in preparation for the coming landing attempt.

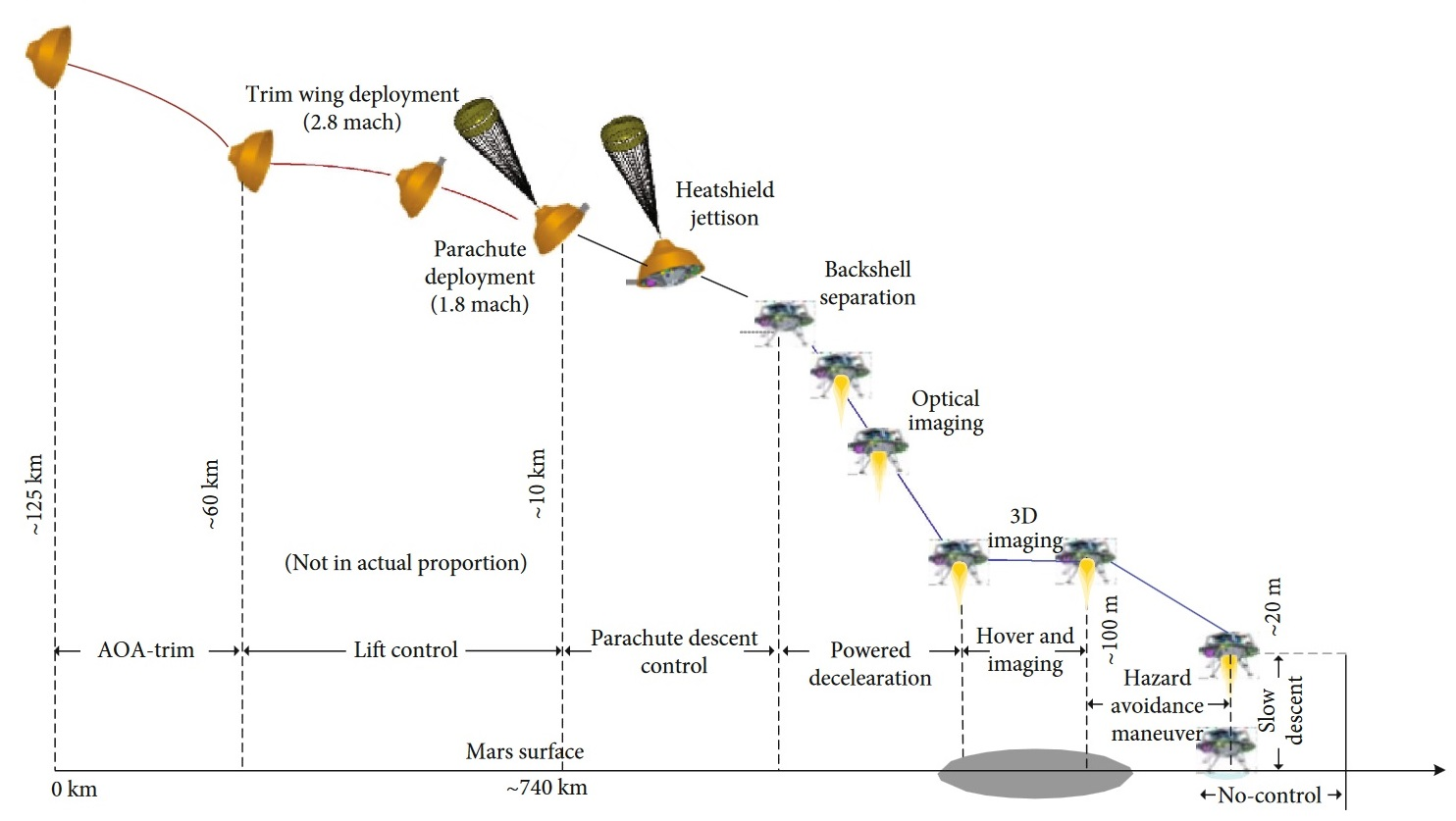
Entry, descent and landing (EDL) sequence of Tianwen-1 lander and Zhurong rover

On 14 May 2021, the lander and Zhurong rover separated from Tianwen-1's orbiter. After performing a Mars atmospheric entry that lasted about nine minutes, the lander and rover made a successful soft landing in the Utopia Planitia, using a combination of aeroshell, parachute, and retrorocket. With the landing, China became the second country to operate a fully functional spacecraft on Martian surface, after the United States.

After establishing stable communication with the rover, CNSA released its first pictures from the surface of Mars on 19 May 2021.

On 22 May 2021, at 10:10 a.m. Beijing time (0240 GMT), Zhurong drove from its landing platform to the surface of Mars, starting its exploration mission.

On 11 June 2021, CNSA released the first batch of scientific images from the surface of Mars including a panoramic image taken by Zhurong, and a colored group photograph of Zhurong and the Tianwen-1 lander taken by a wireless camera placed on Martian soil. The panoramic image was composed of 24 single shots taken by the Navigation and Topography Camera before the rover was deployed to the Martian surface. The image revealed that the topography and rock abundance near the landing site was consistent with previous anticipations from the scientist on typical south Utopia Planitia features with small but widespread rocks, white wave patterns, and mud volcanoes.

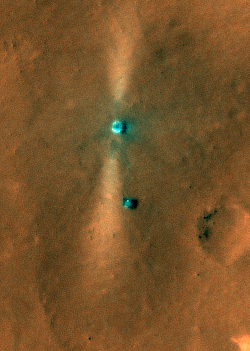
Rover and lander captured by HiRISE from NASA's MRO on 6 June 2021

On 27 June 2021, CNSA released images and videos of Zhurong's atmospheric entry, descent, and landing (EDL) process and movement on Martian surface, including a clip of sounds made by Zhurong recorded by its instrument, Mars Climatic Station (MCS).

As of 11 July 2021, CNSA announced that Zhurong had travelled more than 410 m (1,350 ft) on the Martian surface.

On 12 July 2021, Zhurong visited the parachute and backshell dropped onto the Martian surface during its landing on 14 May.

Operation records of Zhurong
| Date | Operational time | Distance travelled to date | Ref's |
|---|---|---|---|
| 27 June 2021 | 42 sols | 236 m (774 ft) | |
| 11 July 2021 | 55 sols | 410 m (1,350 ft) | |
| 17 July 2021 | 61 sols | 509 m (1,670 ft) | |
| 30 July 2021 | 74 sols | 708 m (2,323 ft) | |
| 6 August 2021 | 81 sols | 808 m (2,651 ft) | |
| 23 August 2021 | 97 sols | 1,000 m (3,300 ft) | |
| 1 January 2022 | 222 sols | 1,400 m (4,600 ft) | |
| 6 May 2022 | 347 sols | 1,921 m (6,302 ft) | |

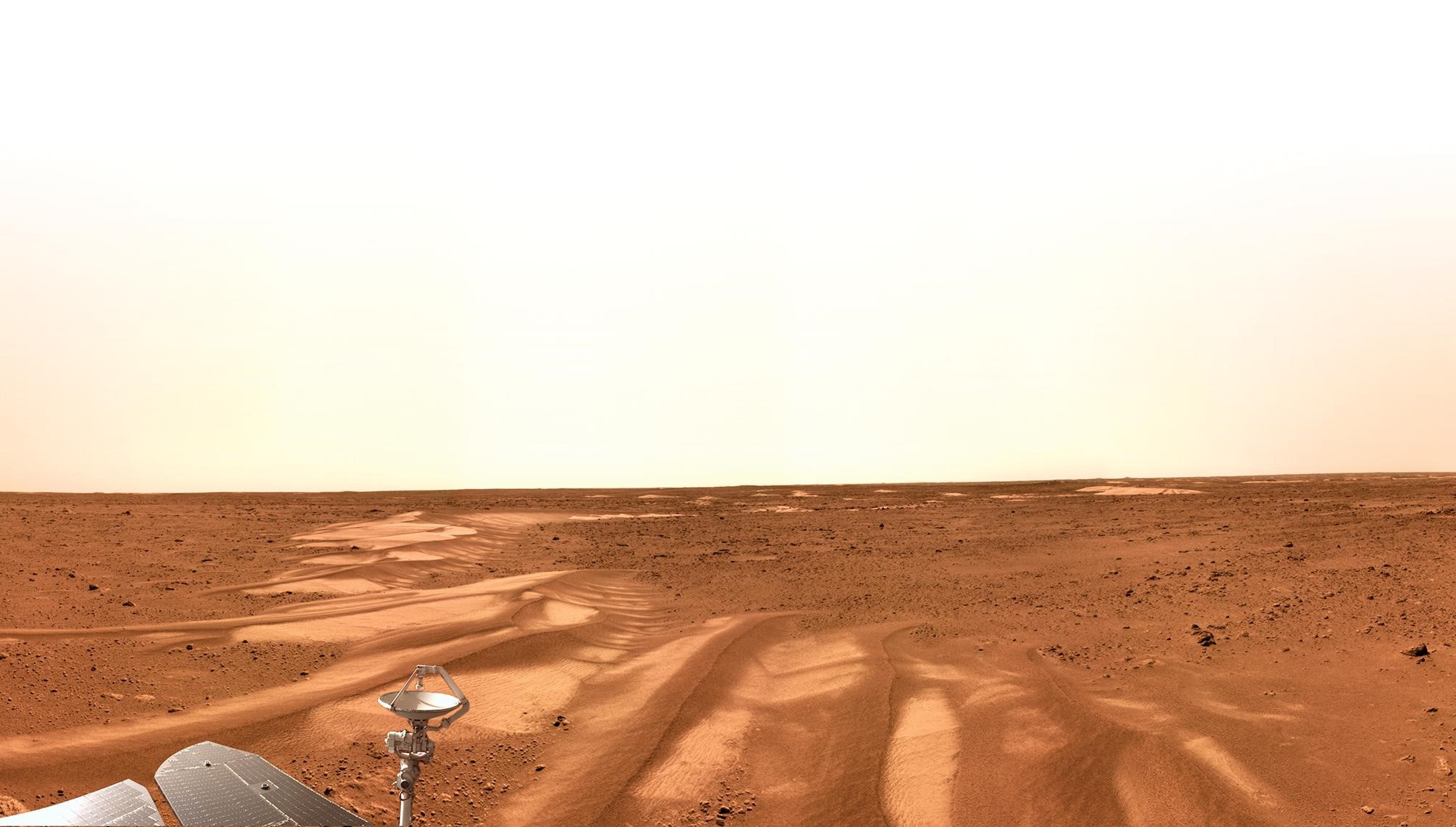
Mars surface captured by Zhurong rover

As of 15 August 2021, Zhurong had officially completed its planned exploration tasks and would continue to drive towards the southern part of Utopia Planitia where it landed. On 18 August 2021, Zhurong had outlived its expected lifespan. The Chinese scientists and engineers announced an extended expedition aiming to investigate an ancient coastal area on Mars.

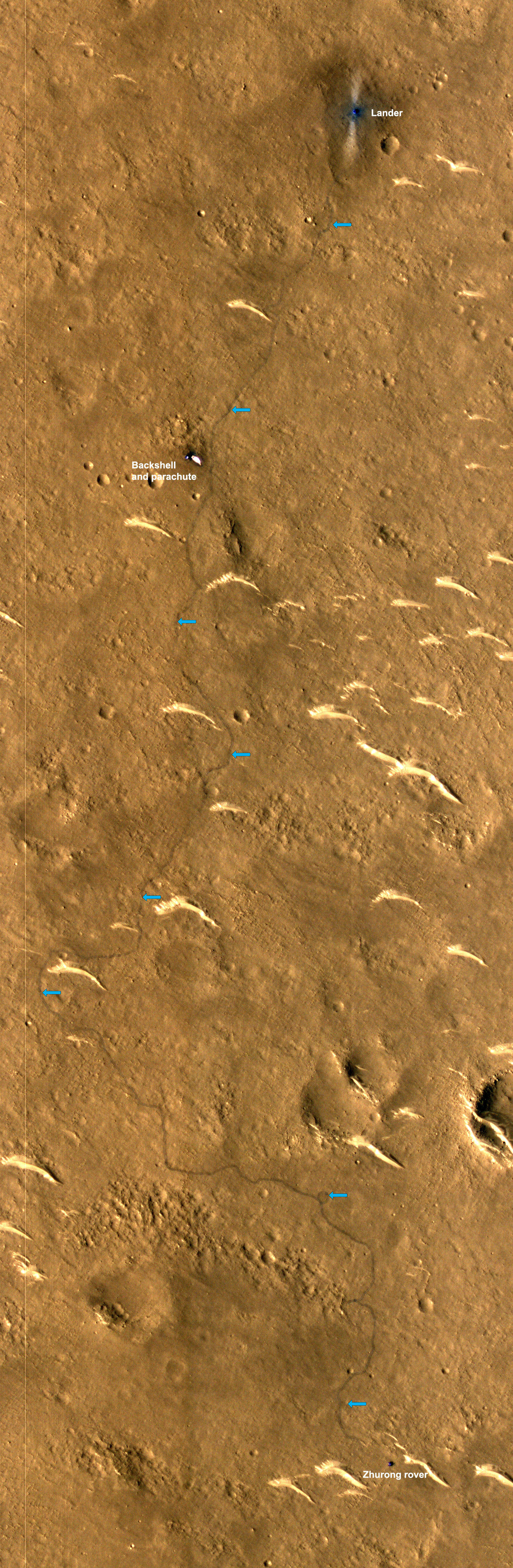
Path and distance travelled (~1.5km) by Zhurong on 11 Mar 2022 (293 sols)

After 20 October 2021, the rover continued, having paused and stopped in a sleeping mode around the time of the Mars conjunction of October 8. The pause was necessary due to the strong solar radiation in the line of sight with Earth, creating excessive levels of "noise" for secure radio communication to function (radio blackout) with the Chinese relay satellite orbiting Mars. The rover continued to travel in a southerly direction.

By September 2022, Zhurong had returned a total of 1,480 gigabytes of data, offering evidence to support the hypothesis of a former ancient ocean in Utopia Planitia.

On 27 February 2023, Chinese scientists published a Mars weather report, including surface pressure and wind changes on Mars, based on data collected by the rover in its first 325 sols.

In May 2022, Zhurong was switched to hibernation mode to protect against the coming Martian winter and an approaching major sandstorm, with an expected awakening date on 26 December 2022. In January 2023, the South China Morning Post reported that CNSA scientists did not receive a signal from the rover. CNSA planned to dispatch the Tianwen-1 orbiter for investigation. The rover stayed in Utopia Planitia, where the temperature was extremely low at -100 °C (-148 °F). According to the authorities, the rover was programmed to restart when its power level reaches 140 watts with key components warmed to -15 °C (5 °F).

It was speculated in the scientific journal Nature that the duststorm reduced solar radiation on the Martian surface and covered the solar panels, leading to insufficient energy to restart the solar-powered rover. Zhurong was observed covered in sand and dust, hindering its ability to gather sunlight and recharge. The rover is equipped with flippable butterfly-like solar panels to remove accumulated dust and debris, but the cleaning function requires the rover to be operational first. The rover does not carry a radioisotope heater unit, and heating is instead provided by the chemical compound n-undecane to store energy. Zhurong could possibly restart if whirlwinds cleaned the dust off the solar panels and radiation levels continued to rise in Martian summer. On 21 February 2023, the Mars Reconnaissance Orbiter confirmed that the rover did not change its position after the hibernation, between September 2022 and February 2023, and data from NASA's Perseverance rover indicated the Martian surface was still relatively cold in February, potentially below Zhurong's awakening requirement.

On 25 April 2023, the mission designer Zhang Rongqiao announced that the buildup of dust from the last inactivation is greater than planned, indicating the rover could be inactive "forever".

In July 2023, an analysis on the Zhurong rover found major climate change happened on Mars 400,000 years ago, which coincided with the end of the last ice age on Mars. Further data analysis helped scientists to simulate ancient Mars's climate and the cause behind the changes.

According to a study released in February 2025, an international team of researchers detected buried evidence of beaches beneath a plain on Mars. This underscores the likelihood that an ocean covered a third of the planet's surface.

=== Cooperation with European Space Agency ===
In November 2021, the CNSA and European Space Agency (ESA) conducted tests to learn if an ESA orbiter, Mars Express, could serve as a relay for data sent from Zhurong. Several steps were involved: ESA commanded Mars Express to point toward Zhurong while passing overhead so it could receive a signal from the rover. CNSA commanded its Tianwen-1 orbiter to instruct Zhurong to send the data. Mars Express received data from Zhurong and transmitted it to Earth. The deep space stations of ESA received the data and sent it to CNSA. The data were then compared with the original Chinese signal. Five tests were performed, but four of them failed. A test on November 20 succeeded. The analysis found that another device aboard Mars Express caused the failures by disturbing transmission. Tianwen-1's ability to act as a relay for Zhurong has lessened because it was spending more time on its main mission of mapping Mars. As a result, CNSA and ESA agreed to the tests to determine if Mars Express could be a relay for the rover.

== Exploration ==
=== Objectives ===
The rover's mission planned tasks are to:

- Study the topography and geology of the local area
- Examine the soil, and any ice content
- Survey the elements, minerals and rocks
- Atmospheric sampling

=== Instruments ===
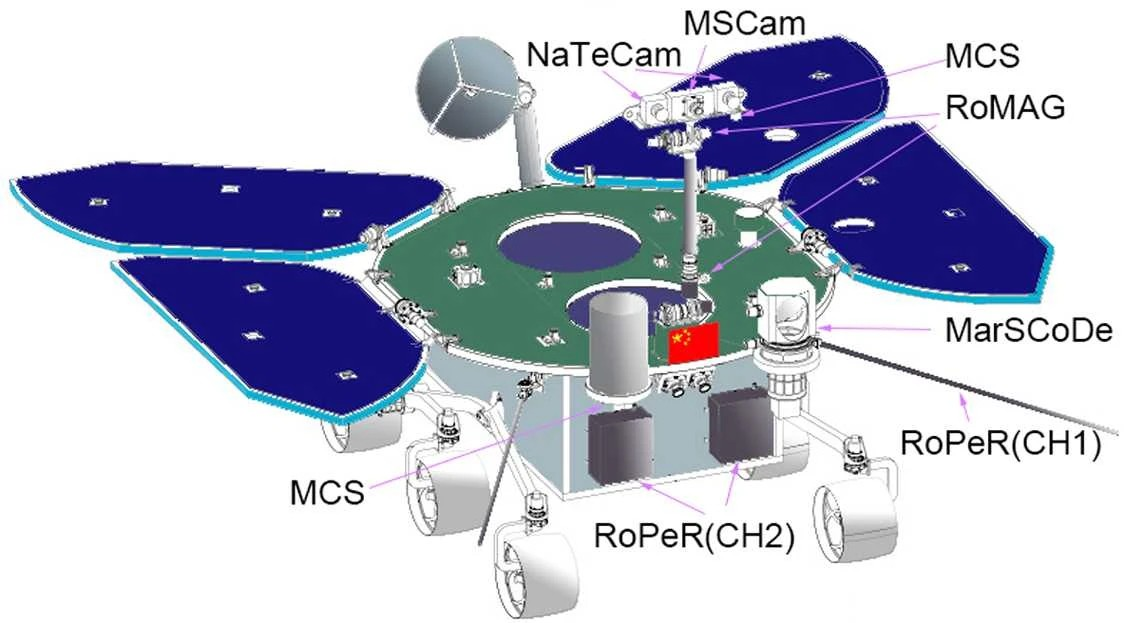
The configuration and layout of payloads on board the Zhurong rover

The six-wheeled rover weighs 240 kg, and is 1.85 m tall. It is powered by four solar panels along with n-undecane stored in 10 containers under two circular windows on the deck absorbs heat and melts during the daytime and solidifies and releases heat at night. It carries six scientific instruments:

- Mars Rover Penetrating Radar (RoPeR) Ground-penetrating radar (GPR), two frequencies, to image about 100 m (330 ft) below the Martian surface. NASA's Perseverance rover, launched and landed in the same year, is also equipped with the ground-penetrating radar.
- Mars Rover Magnetometer (RoMAG) obtains the fine-scale structures of crustal magnetic field based on mobile measurements on the Martian surface.
- Mars Climate Station (MCS) (also MMMI Mars Meteorological Measurement Instrument) measures the temperature, pressure, wind velocity and direction of the surface atmosphere, and has a microphone to capture Martian sounds. During the rover's deployment, it recorded the sound, acting as the second Martian sound instrument to record Martian sounds successfully after Mars 2020 Perseverance rover's microphones.
- Mars Surface Compound Detector (MarSCoDe) combines laser-induced breakdown spectroscopy (LIBS) and infrared spectroscopy.
- Multispectral Camera (MSCam) Combined with MarSCoDe, MSCam investigates the mineral components to establish the relationship between Martian surface water environment and secondary mineral types, and to search for historical environmental conditions for the presence of liquid water.
- Navigation and Topography Cameras (NaTeCam) With 2048 × 2048 resolution, NaTeCam is used to construct topography maps, extract parameters such as slope, undulation and roughness, investigate geological structures, and conduct comprehensive analysis on the geological structure of the surface parameters.

Among the six scientific instruments, RoPeR works during roving; MarSCoDe, MSCam and NaTeCam work when being stationary; RoMAG and MCS work both when moving or still.

Other instruments include:

- Remote Camera A small camera dropped by the rover to take photos of the rover and the lander on 1 June 2021. Captured images are transferred to the rover via Wi-Fi.

=== Plan ===
The rover had a planned operational lifetime of 90 sols. Originally, every three sols were defined as one operation period. The basic process of each operation period was:

- Sol 1: NaTeCam captures images on Martian surface for analysis and operations planning.
- Sol 2: Each payload performs scientific exploration.
- Sol 3: The rover moves towards target location. RoMAG and MCS collect data when roving.

Acquired data is downlinked each sol. The data will be processed by teams in CNSA during an official 5–6 months' proprietary period before being released to the scientific community.

In July 2021, the designer of Tianwen-1 orbiter disclosed that due to Zhurong's better-than-expected performance, the original three-day period has been merged into one, accelerating its exploration process.

== Discoveries ==
Five dunes were investigated on the rover one traverse bright dunes is an eroded barchan. Bright sands make up the main barchan body; dark sands clearly overlay the bright dunes. The dark sand accumulations are characterized by small longitudinal dunes, transverse ripples and ridges. A study of dune shapes found that there was a major change in the dunes when the tilt of Mars changed. At the same time, the layers in the polar ice caps displayed a change as well.

Data from the Zhurong rover suggests liquid water can exist on present day Mars. The data came from the Navigation and Terrain Camera (NaTeCam), the Multispectral Camera (MSCam), and the Mars Surface Composition Detector (MarSCoDe) aboard the Zhurong rover.

On the surface the team found crusts, cracks, granulation, polygonal ridges, and a strip-like trace. Spectral data showed that the dune surface contains hydrated sulfates, hydrated silica (especially opal-CT), trivalent iron oxide minerals (especially ferrihydrite), and possibly chlorides. The team of researchers concluded that the observed features were due to liquid saline water. This water was derived from frost/snow that melted on the dunes.

Snow and/or frost forms on dunes at times. Because of the high salt content, that snow/ice melts at a lower temperature. When the water evaporates, it leaves behind hydrated sulfate, opal, iron oxide, and other hydrated minerals. These act as cements to form a crust. As more drying happens, the crust forms cracks.

Data from the Zhurong rover lead scientists to suggest that liquid water may have been present on at the landing site much later than was previously believed. Hydrated sulfate/silica materials were found in bright-toned rocks. The minerals formed a "duricrust." It was made either by groundwater rising or subsurface ice melting. Maybe, hot magma under the surface melted some of the abundant ice under the surface. The water could have moved to the surface and deposited minerals as it evaporated to make the duricrust.

Bo Wu and colleagues at Hong Kong Polytechnic University "spotted several water-related features around the rover`s landing area" these features included "crater-like pitted cones, troughs, sediment channels and mud volcano formations". These findings have interpreted this data as evidence of an ancient coastline, providing further evidence supporting the theory of a Martian ocean but also presents a "discussion on its probable evolutionary scenario".

Data from Zhurong along with data from other instruments on orbiting satellites was used to determine the extent and lifetime of an ocean in Utopia. Manganese oxides can act as marker for past oceans, especially around water-air boundaries. Manganese minerals react with oxygen. In oxygen-poor water, manganese remains in its dissolved, soluble form. But, when oxygen becomes available it is oxidized into insoluble solid oxides, which can become signatures of water activity. Manganise minerals created a sort of "bathtub ring" in parts of Utopia. This was interpreted to be deposits of Manganese oxides that were depostied by an ocean. The team estimated that the ocean lasted around 0.8–1.5 million years.

== Gallery ==
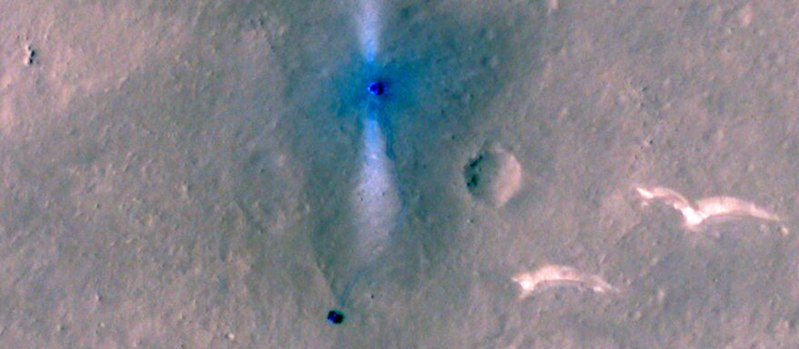
The Zhurong rover and Tianwen-1 lander as seen by MRO on 11 June 2021.

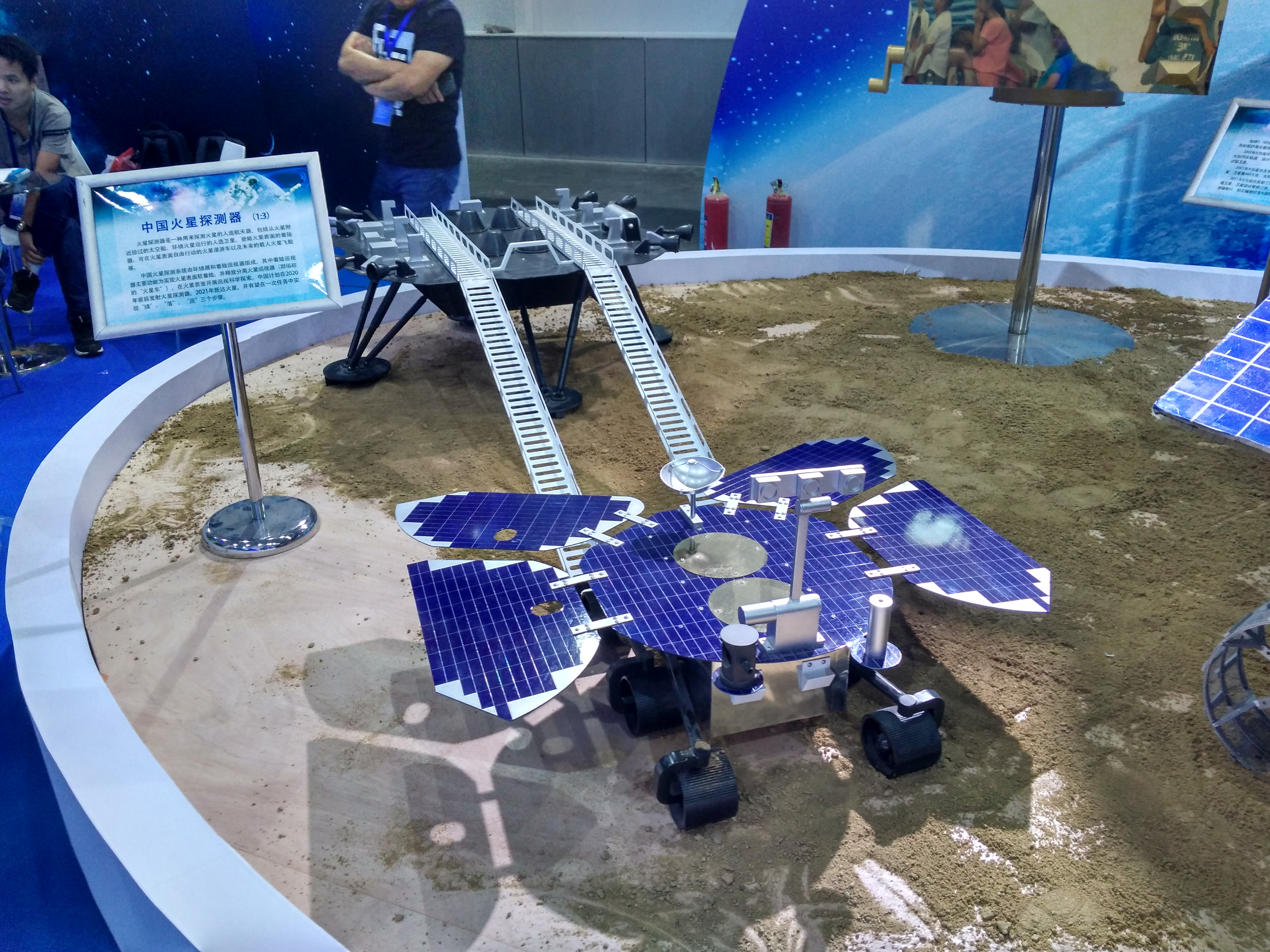
Scale model of the Tianwen-1 lander and Zhurong rover.

== See also ==
- Planetary Exploration of China
- List of rovers on extraterrestrial bodies
- Exploration of Mars
- Viking 1 (lander)
- Viking 2 (lander)
- Sojourner (rover)
- Spirit (rover)
- Opportunity (rover)
- Curiosity (rover)
- Perseverance (rover)
- Rosalind Franklin (rover) (planned mission)
- Water on Mars
