= Rong County =

Rong County, Rongxian, or Junghsien may refer to:

- Rong County, Guangxi (容县)
- Rong County, Sichuan (荣县)
