= Tianwen-1 =

2020 Interplanetary mission by China to place an orbiter, lander, and rover on Mars

Tianwen-1 天问一号
- The Tianwen-1 orbiter (below) and the capsule housing the lander and Zhurong rover (top).
- Names: Huoxing-1 (火星-1) (2018–2020)
- Mission type: Mars exploration
- Operator: CNSA
- COSPAR ID: 2020-049A
- SATCAT no.: 45935
- Mission duration: 2230 days, 12 hours, 45 minutes (since launch); Orbiter: 2 Earth years (planned); 2028 days, 5 hours, 34 minutes (since orbit insertion); Zhurong: 90 sols (93 earth days) (planned); 358 days (since deployment)

Spacecraft properties
- Spacecraft: Orbiter; lander; Zhurong; 2 Tianwen-1 Deployable Cameras (TDCs); Tianwen-1 Remote Camera (TRC)
- Manufacturer: SAST; CAST
- Launch mass: Total: 5,000 kg (11,000 lb); Orbiter: 3,715 kg (8,190 lb); Zhurong: 240 kg (530 lb)
- Dimensions: Zhurong: 2.6 m × 3 m × 1.85 m (8 ft 6 in × 9 ft 10 in × 6 ft 1 in)

Start of mission
- Launch date: 23 July 2020, 04:41:15 UTC
- Rocket: Long March 5 (Y4)
- Launch site: Wenchang LC-101
- Contractor: China Aerospace Science and Technology Corporation

Mars orbiter
- Spacecraft component: Tianwen-1 Orbiter
- Orbital insertion: 10 February 2021, 11:52 UTC

Flyby of Mars
- Spacecraft component: Tianwen-1 Deployable Camera 1 (TDC-1)
- Closest approach: c.10 February 2021 (deployed from Tianwen-1 Orbiter in September 2020)

Mars lander
- Spacecraft component: Tianwen-1 Lander
- Landing date: 14 May 2021, 23:18 UTC; MSD 52387 06:38 AMT
- Landing site: Utopia Planitia; 25.066°N 109.925°E

Mars rover
- Spacecraft component: Zhurong Rover
- Landing date: 14 May 2021, 23:18 UTC (deployed from Tianwen-1 lander on 22 May 2021, 02:40 UTC)
- Landing site: Utopia Planitia; 25.066°N 109.925°E
- Distance driven: 1.921 km (1.194 mi) as of 5 May 2022

Mars lander
- Spacecraft component: Tianwen-1 Remote Camera (TRC)
- Landing date: 14 May 2021, 23:18 UTC (deployed from Zhurong rover on 1 June 2021 which itself was deployed from Tianwen-1 lander on 22 May 2021, 02:40 UTC)
- Landing site: Utopia Planitia; 25.066°N 109.925°E

Mars orbiter
- Spacecraft component: Tianwen-1 Deployable Camera 2 (TDC-2)
- Orbital insertion: 10 February 2021, 11:52 UTC (entered orbit with the orbiter but was released from Tianwen-1 Orbiter on 31 December 2021)
- Planetary Exploration of China Mars logo Tianwen program

Tianwen-1
- Chinese: 天问一号
- Simplified Chinese: 天问一号
- Traditional Chinese: 天問一號
Transcriptions
Standard Mandarin
- Hanyu Pinyin: TiānWèn Yī Hào
- Yale Romanization: TyānWèn YīHàu

Tianwen-1 (Chinese: 天问一号) (also referred to as TW-1) is an interplanetary mission by the China National Space Administration (CNSA) which sent a robotic spacecraft to Mars, consisting of six spacecraft: an orbiter, two deployable cameras, lander, remote camera, and the Zhurong rover. The spacecraft, with a total mass of nearly five tons, is one of the heaviest probes launched to Mars and carries 14 scientific instruments. It is the first in a series of planned missions undertaken by CNSA as part of its Planetary Exploration of China program.

The mission's scientific objectives include: investigation of Martian surface geology and internal structure, search for indications of current and past presence of water, and characterization of the space environment and the atmosphere of Mars.

The mission was launched from the Wenchang Spacecraft Launch Site on 23 July 2020 on a Long March 5 heavy-lift launch vehicle. After seven months of transit through the inner Solar System, the spacecraft entered Martian orbit on 10 February 2021. For the next three months the probe studied the target landing sites from a reconnaissance orbit. On 14 May 2021, the lander/rover portion of the mission successfully touched down on Mars, making China the third nation to make a soft landing on and establish communication from the Martian surface, after the Soviet Union and the United States. (Note: The United Kingdom's Beagle 2, part of the European Space Agency's Mars Express mission, appears to have landed successfully, but was unable to establish communications after failing to fully deploy its solar panels.)

On 22 May 2021, the Zhurong rover drove onto the Martian surface via the descent ramps on its landing platform. With the successful deployment of the rover, China became the second nation to accomplish this feat, after the United States. In addition, China is the second nation to orbit and the first one to carry out landing and rovering mission on Mars successfully on its maiden attempt. Tianwen-1 is also the second mission to capture audio recordings on the Martian surface, after United States' Perseverance rover. The "smallsat" deployed by the Zhurong rover on the Martian surface consists of a "drop camera" which photographed both the rover itself as well as the Tianwen-1 lander. With a mass of less than 1 kg, the Tianwen-1 remote camera is the lightest artificial object on Mars as of May 2021. On 31 December 2021, the Tianwen-1 orbiter deployed a second deployable camera (TDC-2) into Mars orbit which captured photographs of the Tianwen-1 in orbit to celebrate its achievement of the year and a selfie stick payload was deployed to its working position on orbiter to take images of the orbiter's components and Chinese flag on 30 January 2022 to celebrate the Chinese New Year. In September 2022, the mission was awarded the World Space Award by the International Astronautical Federation.

The Tianwen-1 mission was the second of three Martian exploration missions launched during the July 2020 window, after the United Arab Emirates Space Agency's Hope orbiter, and before NASA's Mars 2020 mission, which landed the Perseverance rover with the attached Ingenuity helicopter drone. The Zhurong rover lost contact in 2023 after failing to awake from a scheduled hibernation.

== Nomenclature ==
China's planetary exploration program is officially dubbed the "Tianwen Series". "Tianwen-1" (Chinese: 天问一号) is the program's first mission, and subsequent planetary missions will be numbered sequentially. The name Tianwen is from the poem of the same name written by Qu Yuan (c. 340–278 BC). The title means "Questions to Tian", a Chinese term for both the sky and heavens. Tianwen-1's rover is named Zhurong (Chinese: 祝融号), after a Chinese mytho-historical figure usually associated with fire and light. The name was chosen through an online poll held from January to February 2021.

== Earlier attempt ==
China's Mars program started in partnership with Russia. In November 2011, the Russian spacecraft Fobos-Grunt, destined for Mars and Phobos, was launched from Baikonur Cosmodrome. The Russian spacecraft carried with it an attached secondary spacecraft, the Yinghuo-1, which was intended to become China's first Mars orbiter (Fobos-Grunt also carried experiments from the Bulgarian Academy of Sciences and the American Planetary Society). However, Fobos-Grunt's main propulsion unit failed to boost the Mars-bound stack from its initial Earth parking orbit and the combined multinational spacecraft and experiments eventually reentered the atmosphere of Earth in January 2012. In 2014, China subsequently began an independent Mars project.

== Mission overview ==
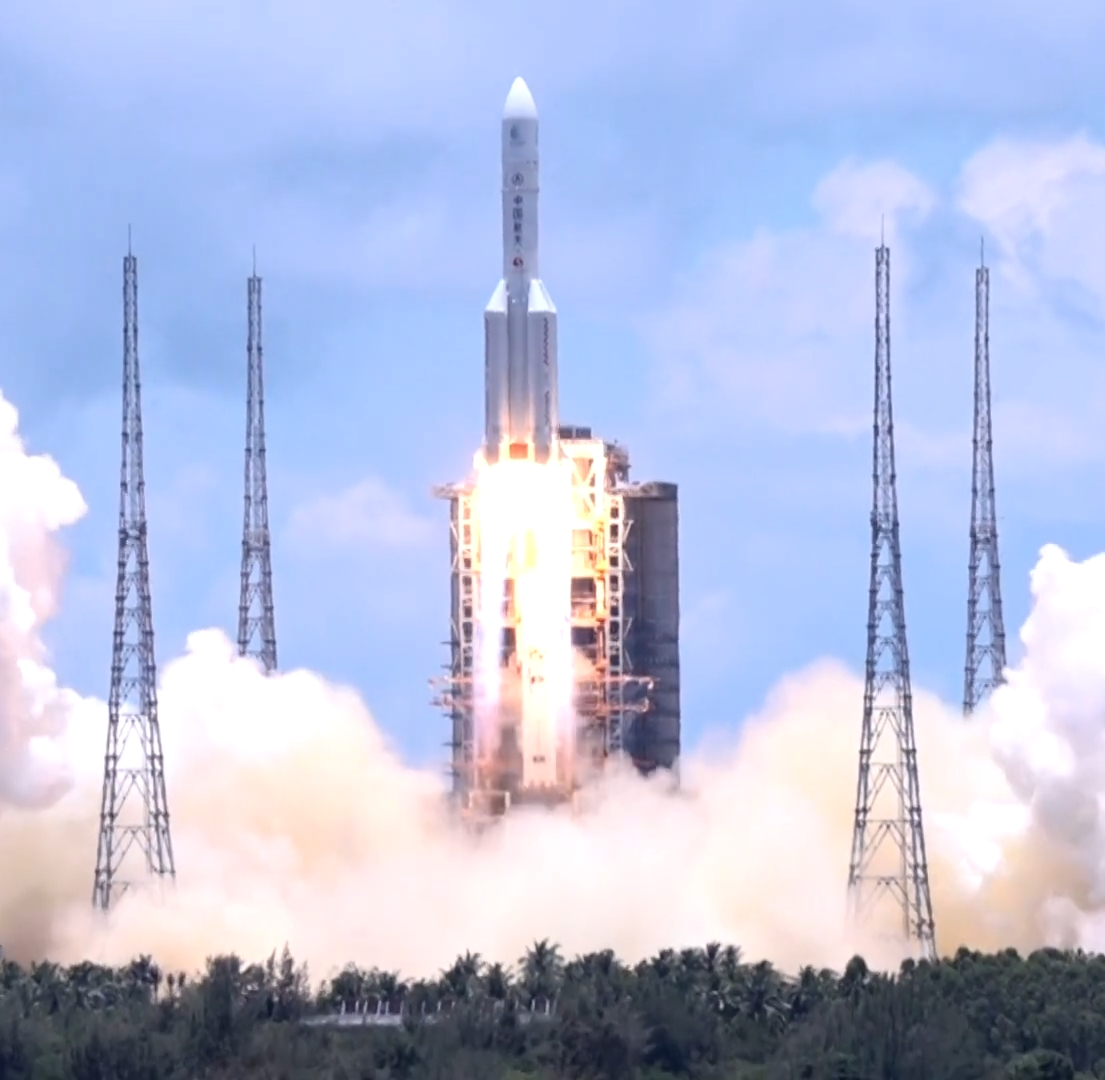
Launch of Tianwen-1 from Wenchang on Hainan, 23 July 2020

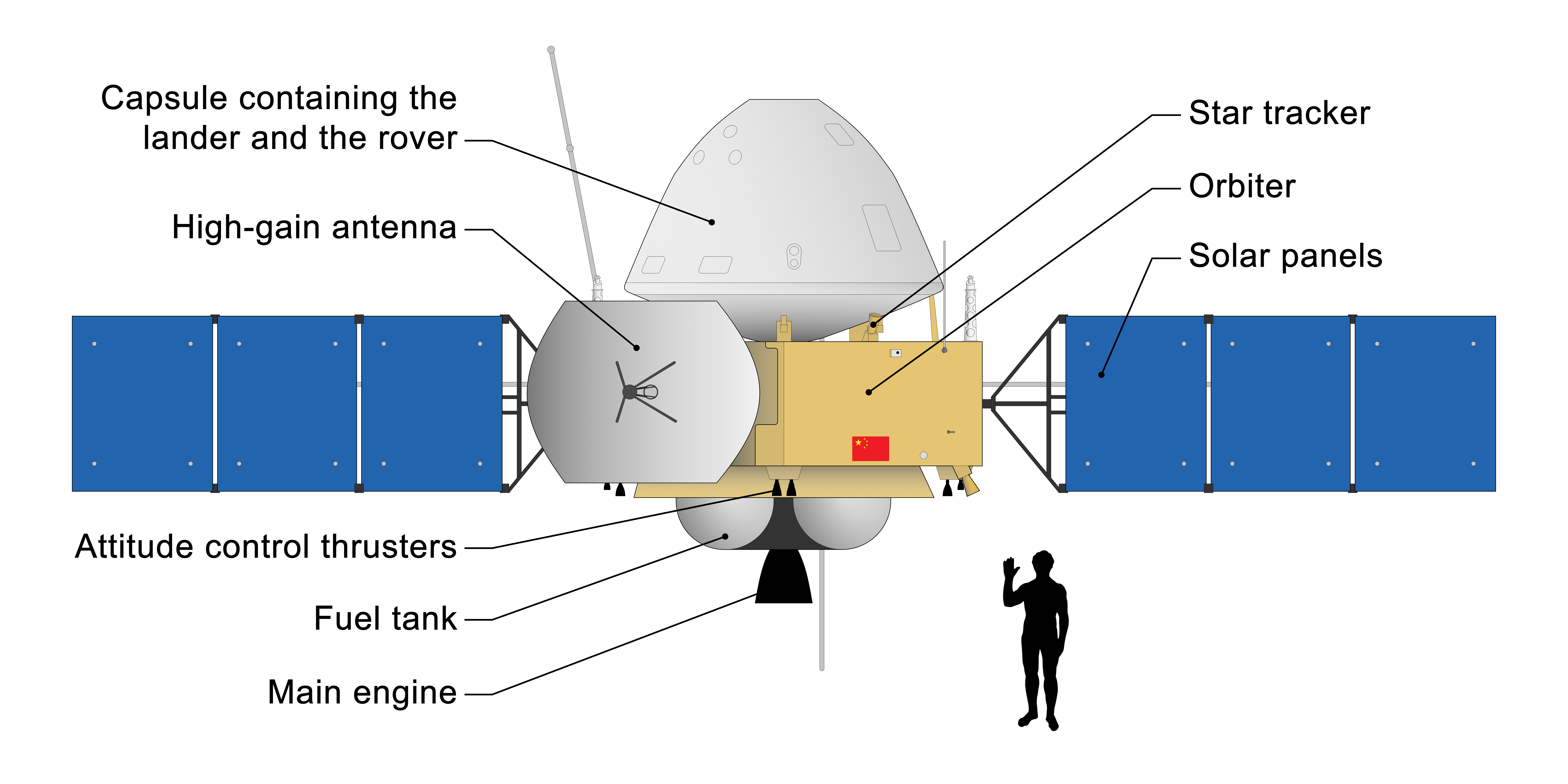
A schematic of the Tianwen-1 spacecraft stack

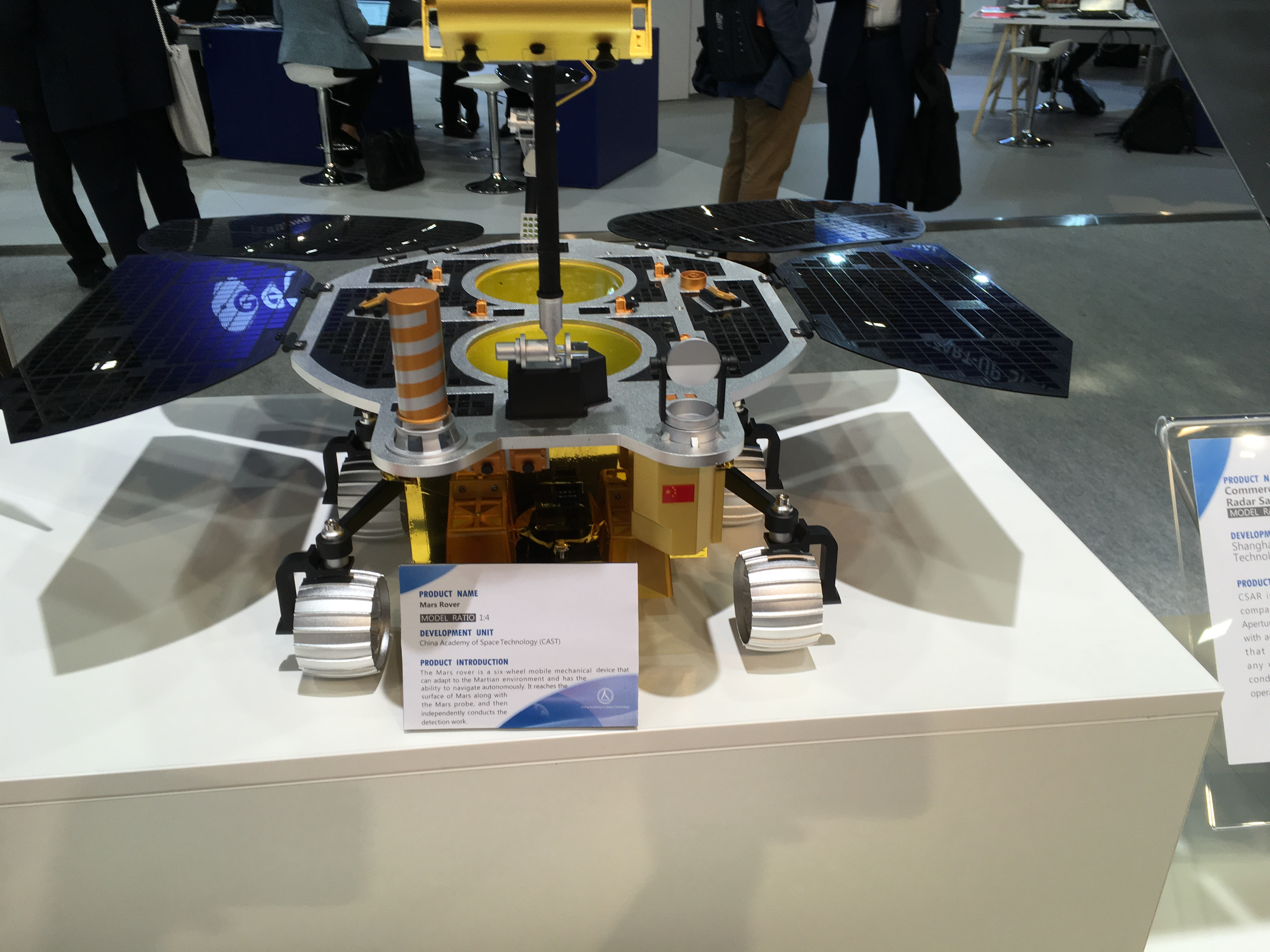
Mockup of the Zhurong rover at the 69th International Astronautical Congress

The new Mars spacecraft, consisting of an orbiter and a lander with an attached rover, was developed by the China Aerospace Science and Technology Corporation (CASC) and is managed by the National Space Science Centre (NSSC) in Beijing. The mission was formally approved in 2016.

On 14 November 2019, CNSA invited some foreign embassies and international organizations to witness hovering and obstacle avoidance test for the Mars Lander of China's first Mars exploration mission at the extraterrestrial celestial landing test site. It was the first public appearance of China's Mars exploration mission.

As the mission preparation proceeded, in April 2020, the mission was formally named "Tianwen-1".

On 23 July 2020, Tianwen-1 was launched from Wenchang Spacecraft Launch Site on the island of Hainan atop a Long March 5 heavy-lift launch vehicle.

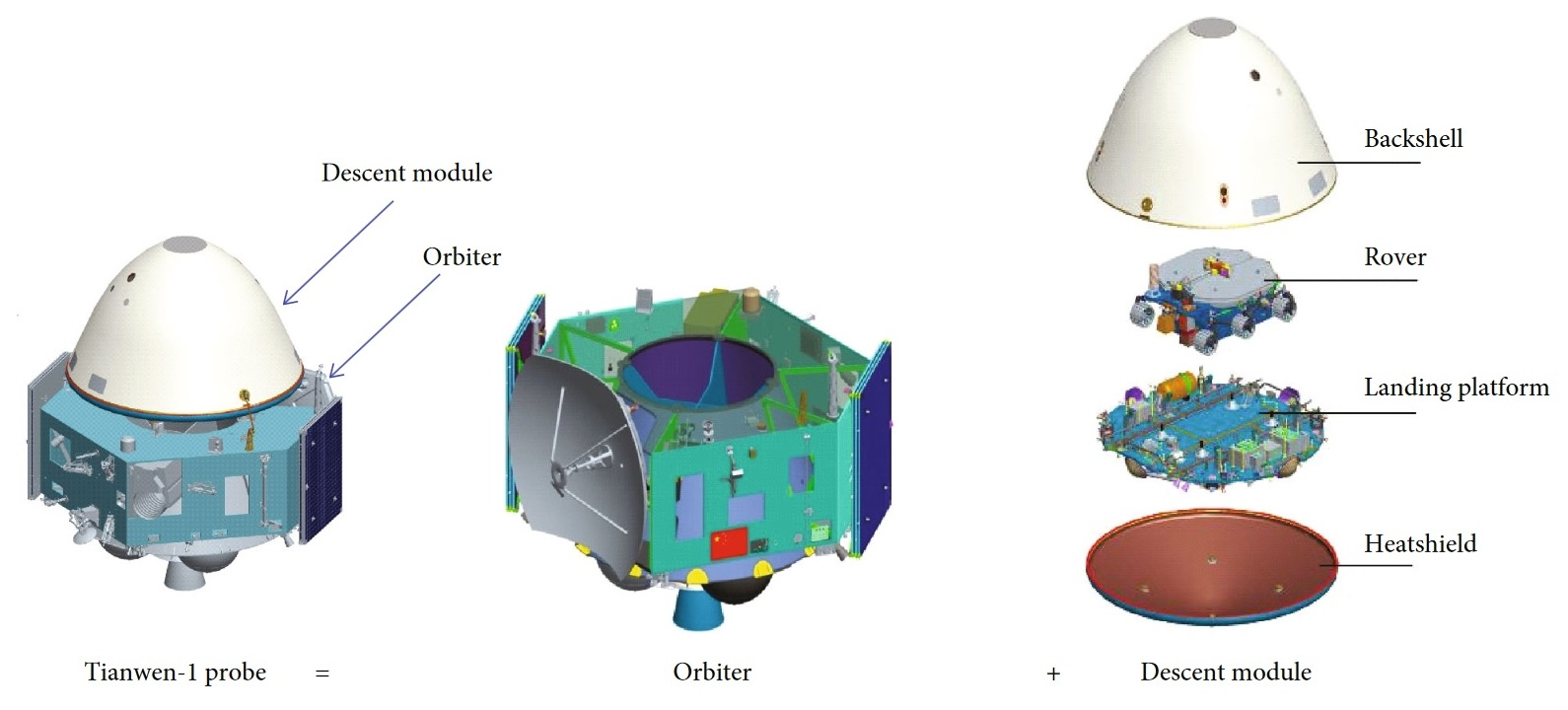
Artist's Rendering of Tianwen-1 mission components

In September 2020, the Tianwen-1 orbiter deployed the Tianwen-1 First Deployable Camera (TDC-1), a small satellite with two cameras that took photos of and tested a radio connection with Tianwen-1. Its mission was to photograph the Tianwen-1 orbiter and the lander's heat shield. Due to the time when it was deployed, it trajectory predicted to do a flyby of Mars with that happening around the orbit insertion date.

During its cruise to Mars, the spacecraft completed four trajectory correction maneuvers plus an additional maneuver to alter its heliocentric orbital inclination; it also performed self diagnostics on multiple payloads. After payload checkouts, the spacecraft began scientific operations with the Mars Energetic Particle Analyzer, mounted on the orbiter, which transmitted initial data back to ground control.

The lander/rover portion of the mission began its Martian landing attempt on 14 May 2021. About nine minutes after the aeroshell housing the lander/rover combination entered the Martian atmosphere, the lander (carrying the rover) safely touched down in the Utopia Planitia region on Mars. After a period spent conducting system checkouts and other planning activities (including taking engineering images of itself), the lander deployed the Zhurong rover for independent surface operations. This rover is powered by solar panels and probed the Martian surface with radar and conducted chemical analyses on the soil; it also looked for biomolecules and biosignatures.

== Mission objectives ==
This is the CNSA's first interplanetary mission, as well as its first independent probe to Mars. The primary goal is therefore to validate China's deep space communications and control technologies, as well as the Administration's ability to successfully orbit and land spacecraft.

From a scientific point of view, the mission must meet five objectives:

- Study the geological structure of Mars and that structure's historical evolution. To do this, the probe will analyze topographical data from characteristic regions such as dry riverbeds, the reliefs of volcanoes, glaciers at the poles, areas affected by wind erosion, etc. The two cameras present on the orbiter are dedicated to this objective.
- Study the characteristics of both the surface and underground layers of Martian soil, as well as the distribution of water ice. This is the role of the radars present on the orbiter and the rover.
- Study the composition and type of rocks on the Martian surface, carbonate minerals present in ancient lakes, rivers, and other landscapes resulting from the past presence of water on the planet, and weathering mineral such as hematites, lamellar silicates, sulphate hydrates and perchlorate. The spectrometers on board the orbiter and the rover as well as the multispectral camera are dedicated to this objective.
- Study the ionosphere, the climate, the seasons, and more generally the atmosphere of Mars, both in its near-space environment and on its surface. This is the role of the two particle detectors present on the orbiter as well as of the rover's weather station.
- Study the internal structure of Mars, its magnetic field, the history of its geological evolution, the internal distribution of its mass, and its gravitational field. The magnetometers as well as the radars present on the orbiter and the rover are dedicated to this objective.

The aims of the mission include searching for evidence of current and past life, producing surface maps, characterizing soil composition and water ice distribution, and examining the Martian atmosphere, particularly its ionosphere.

The mission also serves as a technology demonstration that will be needed for an anticipated Mars sample-return mission proposed for the 2030s. Zhurong will also cache rock and soil samples for retrieval by the later sample-return mission, and the orbiter will make it possible to locate a caching site.

== Mission planning ==
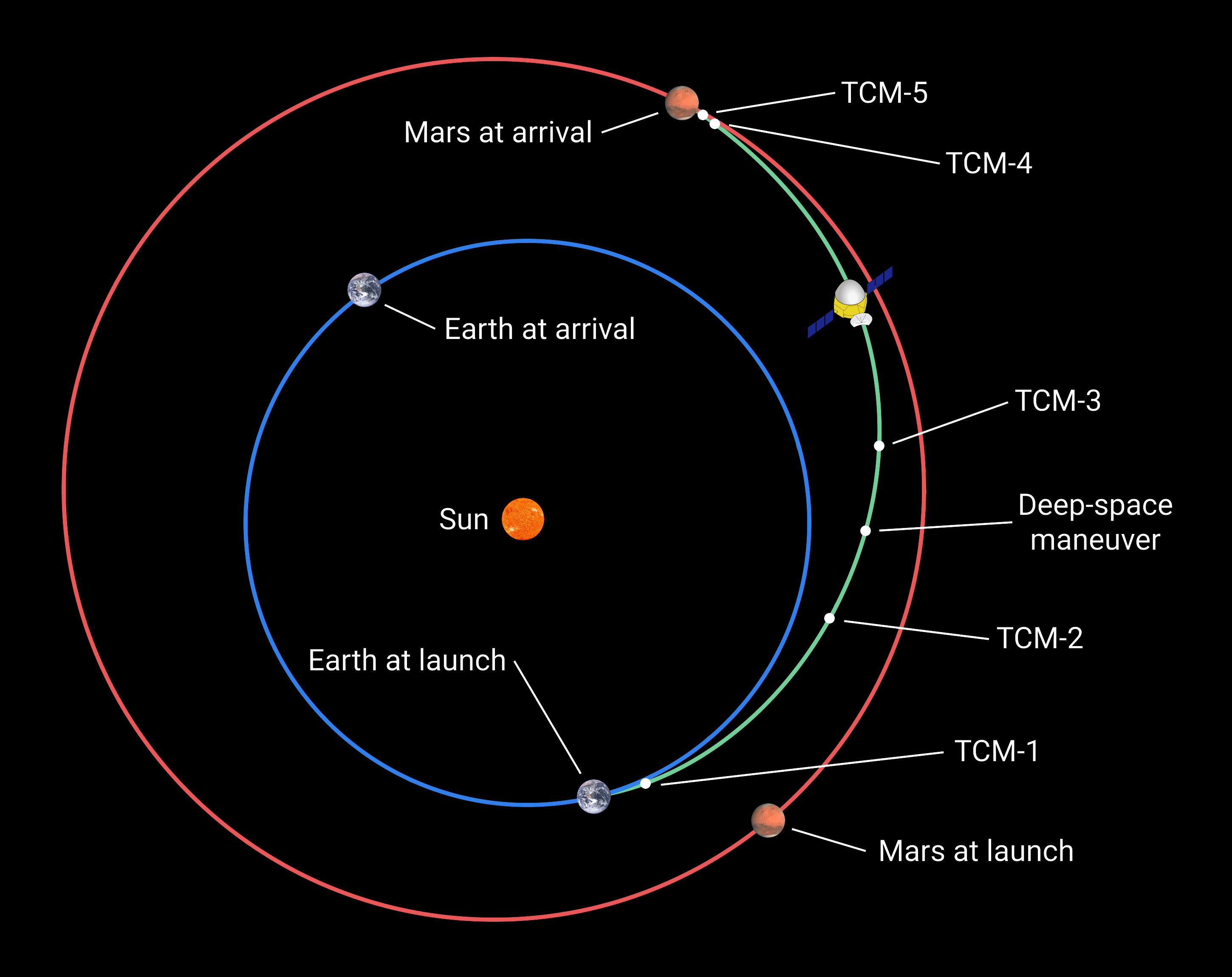
The orbiter's transfer orbit and trajectory correction maneuvers (TCM)

In late 2019, the Xi'an Aerospace Propulsion Institute, a subsidiary of CASC, stated that the performance and control of the future spacecraft's propulsion system has been verified and had passed all requisite pre-flight tests, including tests for hovering, hazard avoidance, deceleration and landing. The main component of the lander's propulsion system consists of a single engine that provides 7,500 N (1,700 lb_{f}) of thrust. The spacecraft's supersonic parachute system had also been successfully tested.

CNSA initially focused on the Chryse Planitia and Elysium Mons regions of Mars in its search for possible landing sites. However, in September 2019 during a joint meeting in Geneva, in Switzerland, of the European Planetary Science Congress-Division for Planetary Sciences, the presenters announced that two preliminary sites in the Utopia Planitia region of Mars have instead been chosen for the anticipated landing attempt, with each site having a landing ellipse of approximately 100 by 40 kilometres.

In July 2020, CNSA provided landing coordinates of 110.318° East longitude and 24.748° North latitude, within the southern portion of Utopia Planitia, as the specific primary landing site. The area was chosen for being both of scientific interest and being safe enough for landing attempts. Simulated landings have been performed as part of mission preparations by the Beijing Institute of Space Mechanics and Electricity.

By 23 January 2020, the Long March 5 Y4 rocket's hydrogen-oxygen engine had completed a 100-seconds test, which was the last engine test prior to the final assembly of the launch vehicle. It successfully launched on 23 July 2020.

== Entering Mars orbit ==
The three Tianwen-1 spacecraft were launched by Long March 5 Heavy-lift launch vehicle on 23 July 2020. Having traveled for about seven months, it entered Mars orbit on 10 February 2021 by performing a burn of its engines to slow down just enough to be captured by Mars's gravitational pull. The orbiter spent several months scanning and imaging the surface of Mars to refine the target landing zone for the lander/rover. It approached at about 265 km (165 mi) (periareion, or periapse) to Mars's surface, allowing a high-resolution camera to return images to Earth and to map the landing site in Utopia Planitia, and to prepare for landing.

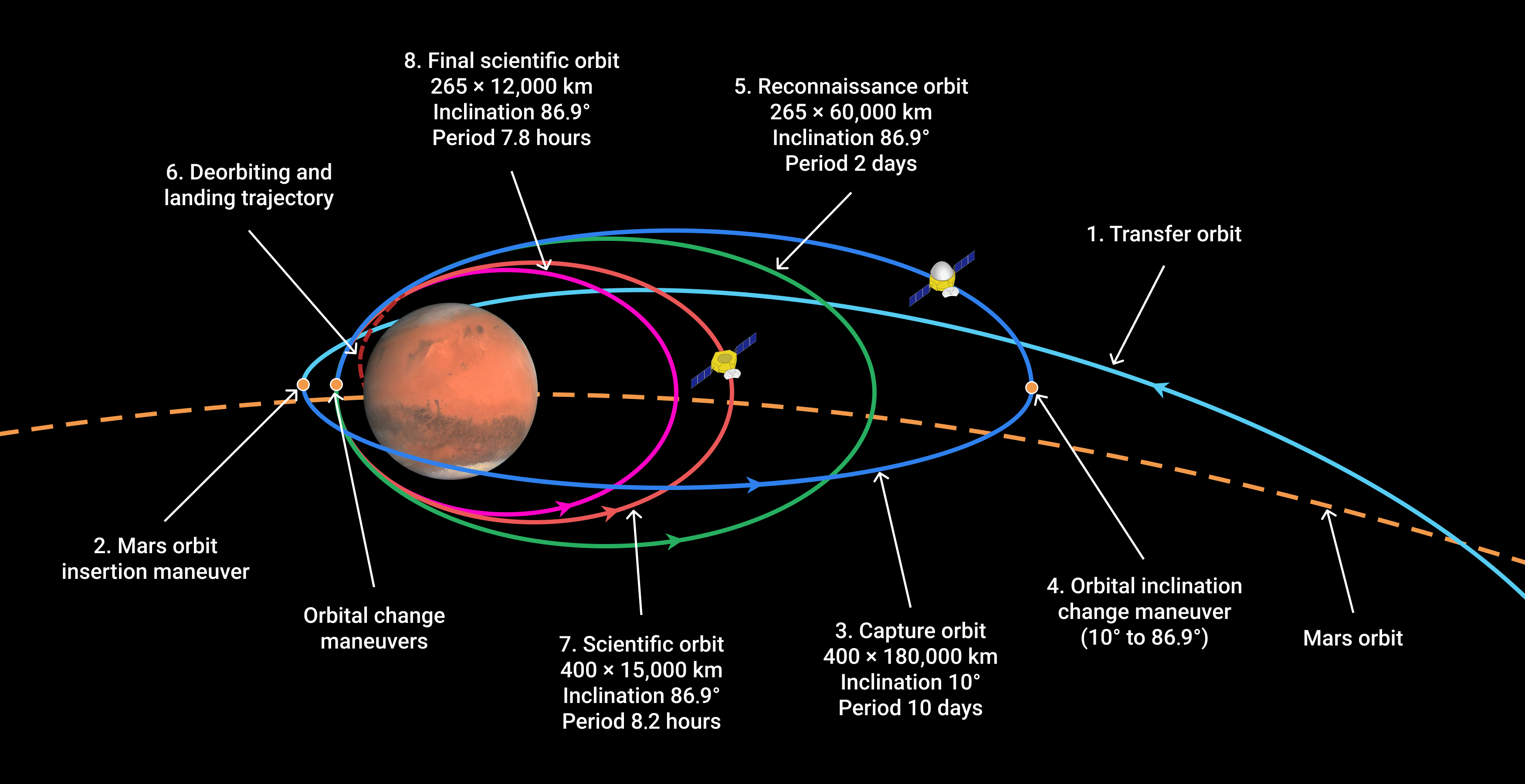
Planned orbital trajectory at Mars

=== Orbital elements ===
Values of final orbital parameters
Parameter	Value (unit)
Periareion altitude	275 km
Apoareion altitude	10,749 km
Inclination	86.3°
Period	7.08 hours

== Landing on Mars ==
=== Landing area selection ===
The landing area selection was based on two major criteria:

- Engineering feasibility, including latitude, altitude, slope, surface condition, rock distribution, local wind speed, visibility requirements during the EDL process.
- Scientific objectives, including geology, soil structure and water ice distribution, surface elements, mineral, and rock distribution, magnetic field detection.

Three initial areas were selected by the site selection team after a global survey of Mars; the three areas were: Amazonis Planitia, Chryse Planitia, and Utopia Planitia. All three candidate landing areas were between five degrees North and thirty degrees North latitude.

According to the site selection team, Amazonis Planitia was dropped from consideration upon further analysis due to the area's small thermal inertias and the possible presence of thick dust in the region; Chryse Planitia was eliminated next due to its rough terrain in terms of elevations, slopes, crater densities, and rock abundances. Finally, a region measuring approximately 180 km (110 mi) x 70 km (43 mi) in Utopia Planitia and centered on 24.748°N 110.318°E was selected as the primary target for further analysis (a backup target with about the same total area and centered on 26.467°N 131.626°E was also selected at that time.) The target landing regions in Utopia Planitia were favored by the selection team also because they present higher chances of finding evidence for the possible presence of ancient ocean on the northern lowlands of Mars.

The primary target region was further constrained in extent using the high-resolution camera (HiRIC) on board the Tianwen-1 orbiter after it entered Martian orbit in February 2021. The HiRIC camera collected high resolution stereo images of the primary landing region; these images were built into mosaics of varying resolutions (e.g. digital elevation models with a resolution of 5 meters per pixel, and maps for automatic crater detection with a resolution of 0.7 meters per pixel.) The accuracy of some of the HiRIC image results were evaluated by comparing them with images generated by the cameras on the Mars Reconnaissance Orbiter.

(a) Hazard index map (5 m/pixel) of the main landing region and candidate landing ellipses 16 and 128; and (b) parameters for the calculation of the hazard indices for candidate ellipses 16 and 128.

Using the HiRIC mosaics, the selection team conducted various terrain analyses on potential candidate landing ellipses within the primary target region in an iterative manner; these analyses included the determination of the candidate ellipse's average slope, the percentage of slope with an angle greater than 8%, average rock abundance, the percentage of area within the candidate ellipse with a rock abundance greater than 10%, and the percentage of cratered area. A 'hazard index' is then distilled from the analyses for each candidate ellipse. Candidate ellipse 16, with the lowest hazard index, emerged as the primary target (candidate ellipse 128, with the next lowest hazard index, was the backup). See the following figure produced by the landing selection team intended to illustrate the calculation of the hazard indices for candidate ellipses 16 and 128.

Ellipse 16 was selected for the attempted landing in May 2021; it is centered on 25.1188°N 109.9305°E with major and minor axes of 55 km (34 mi) and 22 km (14 mi) respectively (the boundary of the ellipse is defined by a landing probability uncertainty of 3 sigmas); also, the major axis of the landing ellipse is tilted with respect to the Martian north by 1.35 degrees to the west, this is a consequence of the planned orbital descent path. On 14 May 2021 (UTC), the Zhurong rover and its landing platform touched down at 25.066°N 109.925°E, at an elevation of −4,099.4 m (−13,449 ft), about 3.1 km (1.9 mi) south of the center of landing ellipse 16.

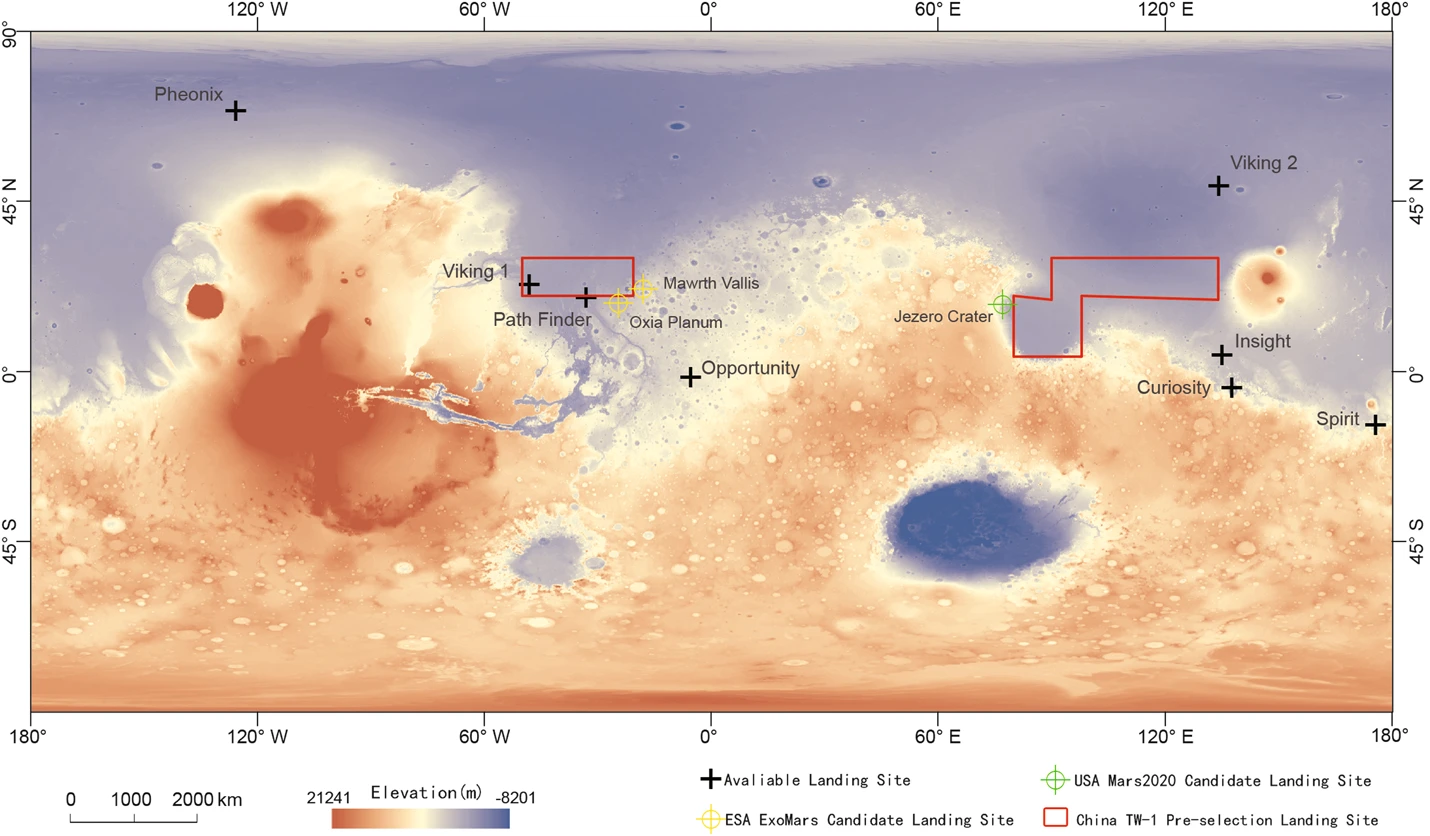
The two landing site candidates of Tianwen-1 mission are enclosed by red lines on Martian map. The one on the left is located in Chryse Planitia and the one on the right in Utopia Planitia.

=== The landing ===
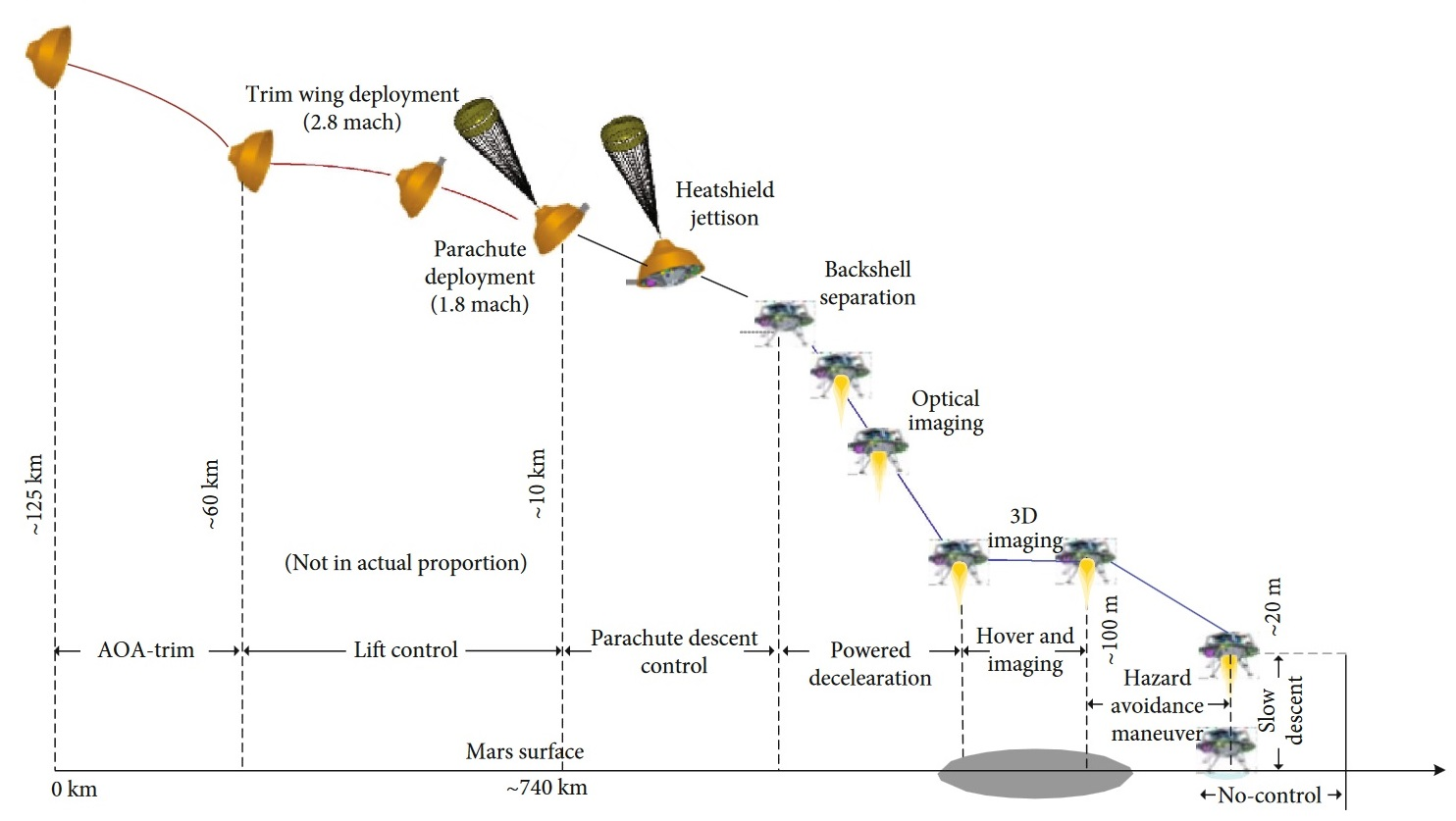
Entry, descent and landing (EDL) sequence of Tianwen-1 lander and Zhurong rover

At 23:18 UTC, on 14 May 2021, the Tianwen-1 lander successfully landed in the preselected landing area in the southern part of the Mars Utopia Planitia. The landing phase began with the release of the protective capsule containing the lander/rover. The capsule made an atmospheric entry followed by a descent phase under parachute, after which the lander used retro-propulsion to soft-land on Mars.

On 19 May 2021, CNSA released for the first time images showing the preparation of the final transfer of the Zhurong rover from the platform of the lander to the Martian soil. The photographs show the solar panels of Zhurong already deployed while Zhurong is still perched on the lander along with two circular windows on the deck under which n-undecane was stored in 10 containers that absorbs heat and melts during the daytime and solidifies and releases heat at night. The long delay for the publication of the first images is explained by the short periods of time when the Zhurong rover and the orbiter are in radio contact and can effectively communicate and transfer data.

On 11 June 2021, CNSA released the first batch of scientific images from the surface of Mars including a panoramic image taken by Zhurong and a group photo of Zhurong and the Tianwen-1 lander taken by the drop camera. The panoramic image is composed of 24 single shots taken by the NaTeCam before the rover was deployed to the Martian surface. The image reveals that the topography and rock abundance near the landing site was consistent with previous anticipations from the scientist on typical south Utopia Planitia features with small but widespread rocks, white wave patterns, and mud volcanoes.

== Exploration of Martian surface ==
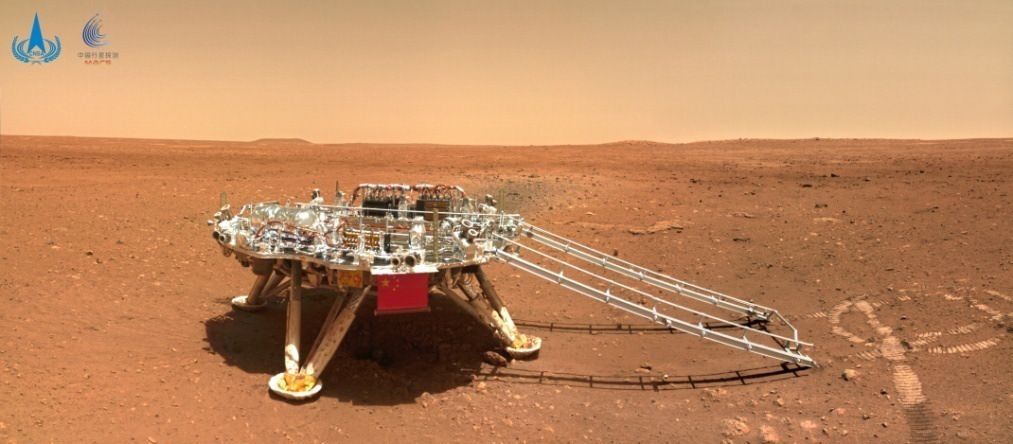
Photo of lander on Mars taken by Zhurong rover

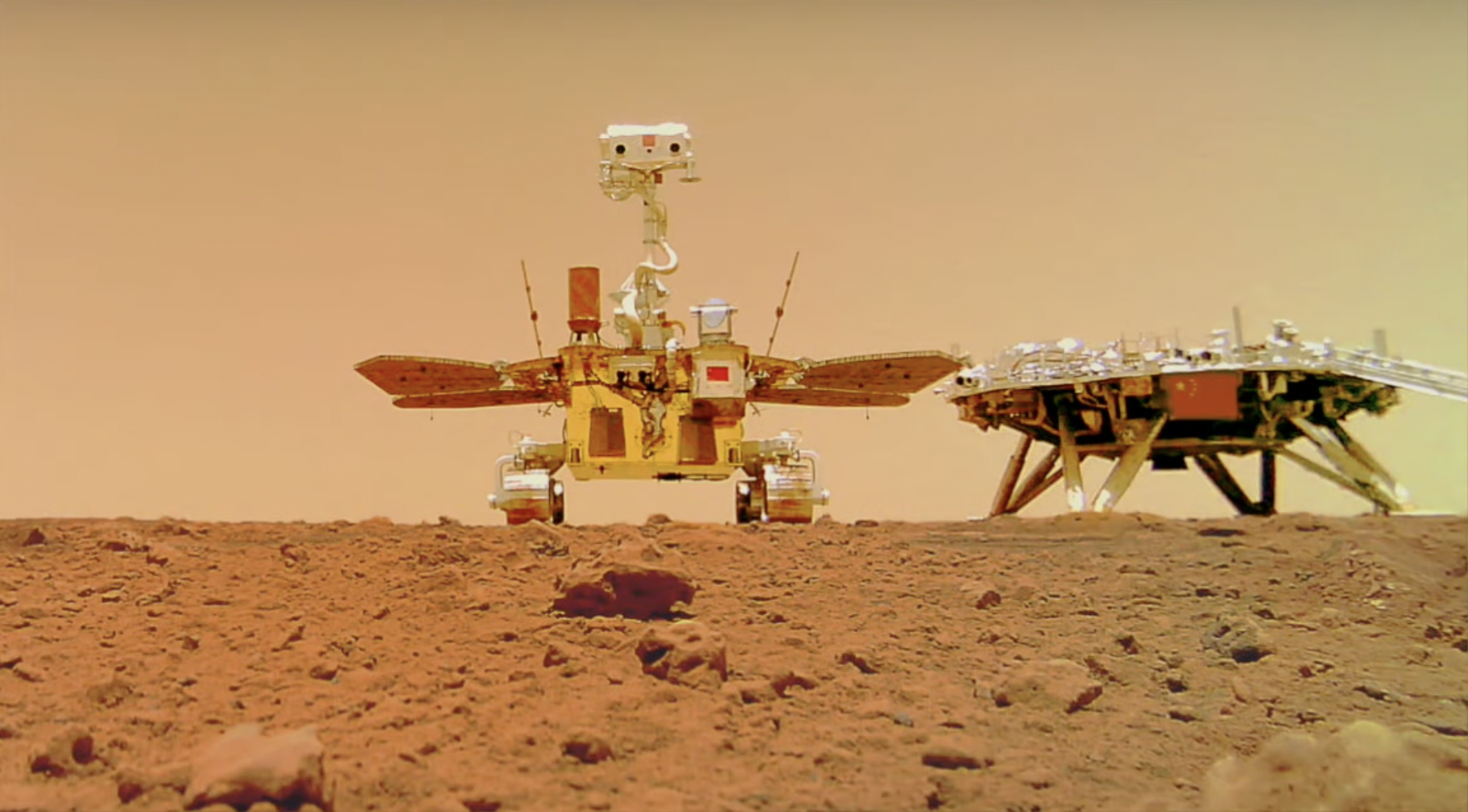
Zhurong selfie with lander, taken by the deployable Tianwen-1 Remote Camera.

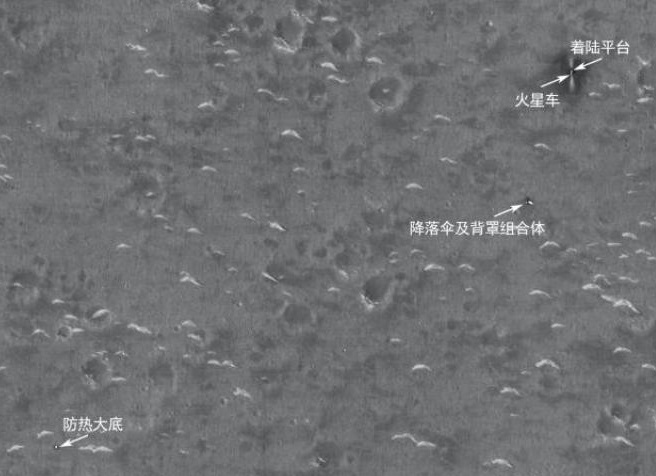
The Zhurong rover and Tianwen-1 lander (above) as seen by the High Resolution Imaging Camera (HiRIC) of the Tianwen-1 orbiter on 2 June 2021

On 22 May 2021 (02:40 UTC), the Zhurong rover descended from its lander onto the Martian surface to begin its scientific mission. The first images received on Earth after the rover deployment showed the empty landing platform and the extended rover-descent ramps. During its deployment, the Rover's instrument, Mars Climatic Station, recorded the sound, acting as the second martian sound instrument to record Martian sounds successfully after Mars 2020 Perseverance rover's microphones.

The Zhurong rover deployed a drop camera to the surface which was able to photograph both the Zhurong rover and the Tianwen-1 lander. The rover is designed to explore the surface for 90 sols; its height is about 1.85 m (6.1 ft) and it has a mass of about 240 kg (530 lb). After the rover deployment, the orbiter would serve as a telecommunications relay for the rover while continuing to conduct its own orbital observations of Mars.

On 12 July 2021, Zhurong visited the parachute and backshell dropped onto the Martian surface during its landing on 14 May.

On 15 August 2021, Zhurong officially completed its planned exploration tasks and will continue to drive towards the southern part of Utopia Planitia where it landed. On 18 August 2021, Zhurong outlived its lifespan of 90 sols and the Chinese scientists and engineers announced an extended expedition aiming to investigate an ancient coastal area on Mars.

From mid-September to late October 2021, both the Tianwen-1 orbiter and Zhurong rover entered safe mode due to a communications blackout around solar conjunction. Both devices were back to active mode after the ending of the blackout.

On 20 May 2022, Zhurong was put into hibernation mode to prepare for the approaching sandstorms and Martian winter, and was programmed to self-awake at an appropriate temperature and sunlight condition. The rover never awoke from hibernation as of 2025, likely due to dust pile up affecting its solar power generation.

On 27 February 2023, the initial results of the meteorological data from the first 325 sols of the mission were published in the journal Nature.

== Instruments ==
=== Scientific instruments ===
To achieve the scientific objectives of the mission, the Tianwen-1 orbiter is equipped with eight scientific instruments, while the Zhurong rover is equipped with six, which include:

==== Orbiter ====
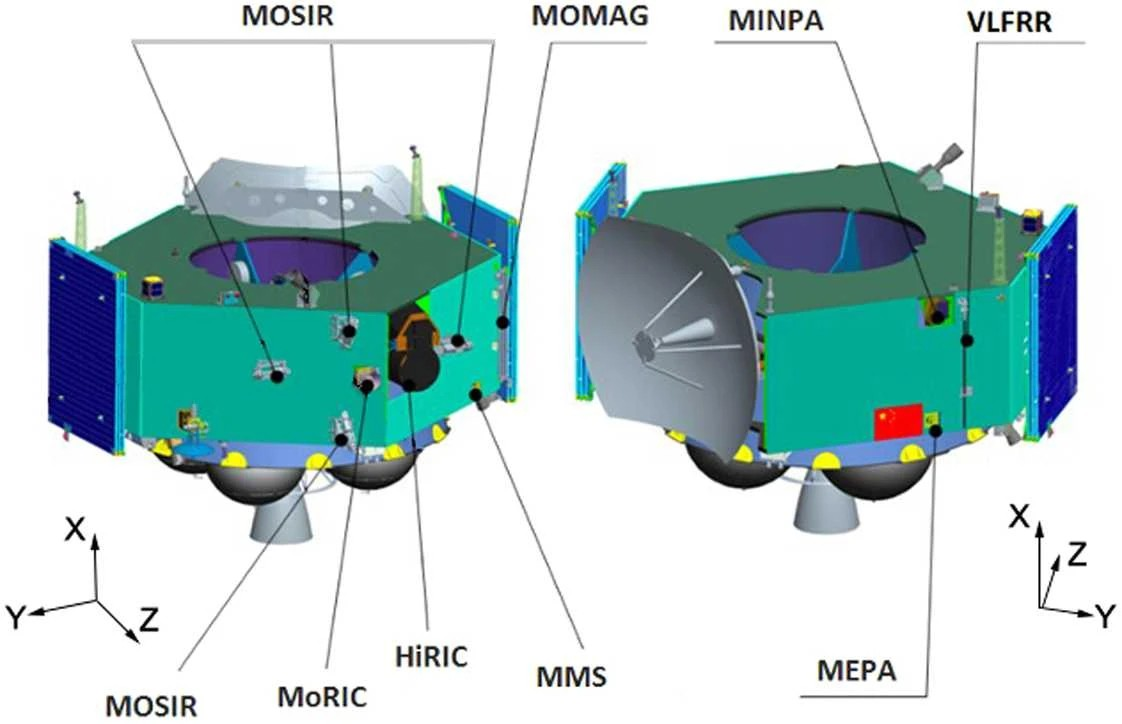
The configuration and layout of payloads on board the Tianwen-1 orbiter

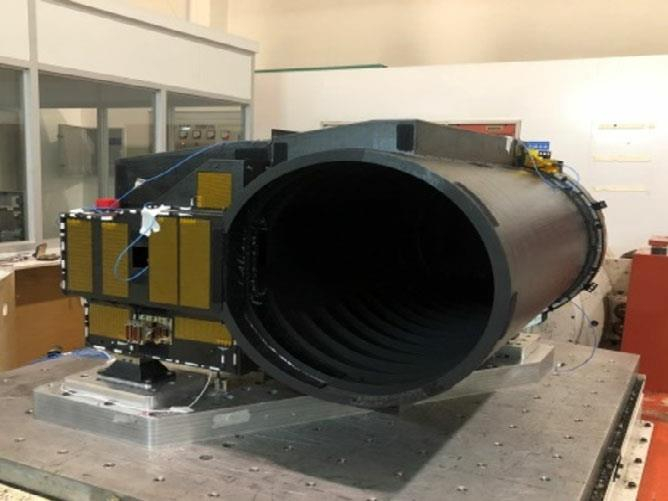
HiRIC on Tianwen-1 orbiter

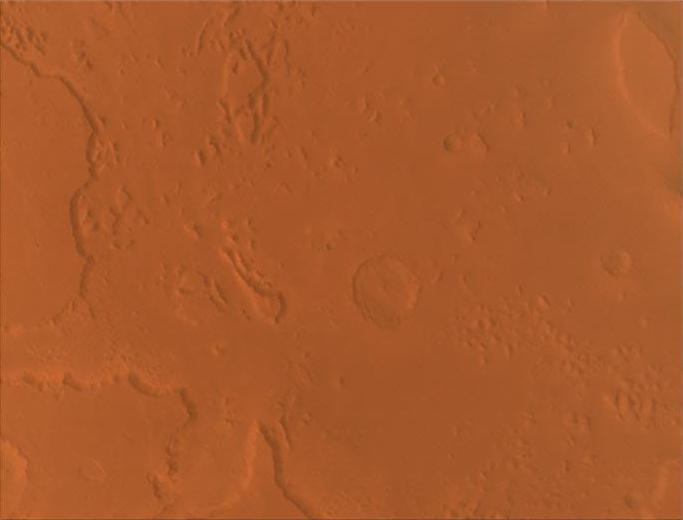
Mars image taken by MoRIC

- Moderate Resolution Imaging Camera (MoRIC) with a resolution of 100 m from a 400 km altitude. It takes color photos in visible band.
- High Resolution Imaging Camera (HiRIC) with a resolution of 2.5 m from a 256 km altitude in panchromatic mode, 10 m in color mode. The camera's primary mirror has a diameter of 387mm.
- Mars Orbiter Magnetometer (MOMAG) is used to map Martian magnetic field.
- Mars Mineralogical Spectrometer (MMS) utilizes the visible and near infrared imaging spectrometer with detection wavelengths ranging from 0.45 to 3.4 μm to investigate and analyze the Martian surface composition. It also investigate the distribution of regolith types and subsurface structure of Mars.
- Mars Orbiter Scientific Investigation Radar (MOSIR) aims to explore the Martian surface and subsurface water-ice by means of the dual-polarization echo characteristics of radar.
- Mars Ion and Neutral Particle Analyzer (MINPA) measures the flux of ions in space environment, distinguishes the main ions and obtains their physical parameters such as the density, velocity and temperature.
- Mars Energetic Particle Analyzer (MEPA) obtains the energy spectrum, flux and elemental composition of energy electrons, protons, α particles and ions.
- Unknown payload, likely the Mars Orbiter Status Monitoring Sensor (MOSMOS), to monitor and evaluate the condition of key components, the Chinese flag and the 2022 Winter Olympics and Paralympics logo on the orbiter. The selfie rod, 0.8 kg (1.8 lb) in weight and 1.6 m (5 ft 3 in) long, is made from shape memory composite material, solar heat makes it extended to working position with two cameras fixed at one end and attached to orbiter on another end along with some degrees of freedom to the arm.

==== Zhurong rover ====
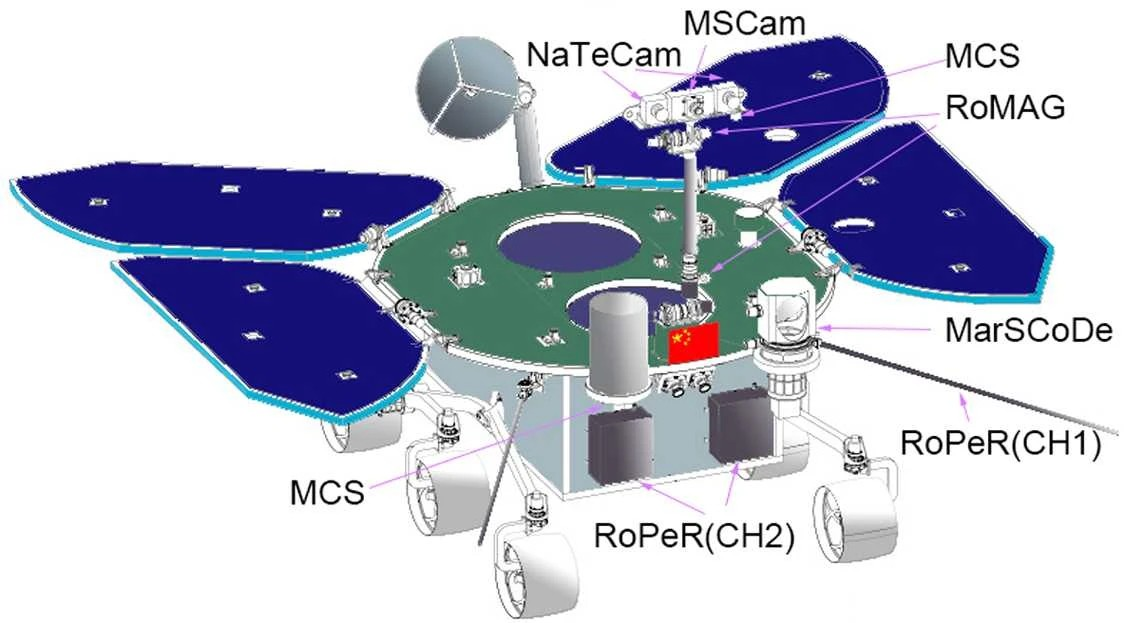
The configuration and layout of payloads on board the Zhurong rover

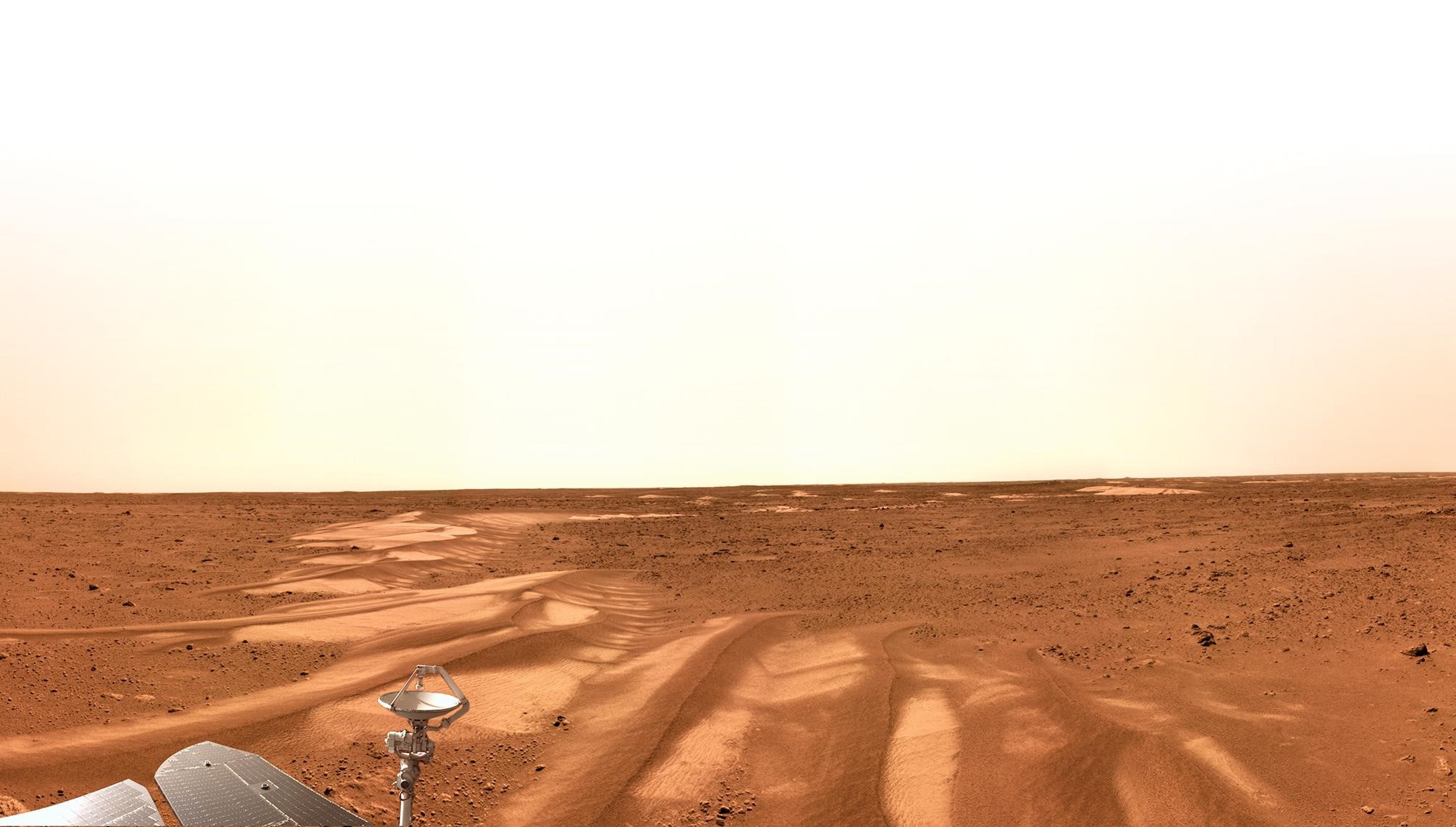
Mars surface captured by Zhurong rover NaTeCam

- Mars Rover Penetrating Radar (RoPeR) Ground-penetrating radar (GPR), two frequencies, to image about 100 m (330 ft) below the Martian surface It was one of the two very first ground-penetrating radars deployed on Mars, along with the one equipped by NASA's Perseverance rover launched and landed in same years.
- Mars Rover Magnetometer (RoMAG) obtains the fine-scale structures of crustal magnetic field based on mobile measurements on the Martian surface.
- Mars Climate Station (MCS) (also MMMI Mars Meteorological Measurement Instrument) measures the temperature, pressure, wind velocity and direction of the surface atmosphere, and a microphone to capture Martian sounds. During rover's deployment, it recorded the sound, acting as the second Martian sound instrument to record Martian sounds successfully after Mars 2020 Perseverance rover's microphones.
- Mars Surface Compound Detector (MarSCoDe) combines laser-induced breakdown spectroscopy (LIBS) and infrared spectroscopy
- Multispectral Camera (MSCam) Combined with MarSCoDe, MSCam investigates the mineral components to establish the relationship between Martian surface water environment and secondary mineral types, and to search for historical environmental conditions for the presence of liquid water.
- Navigation and Topography Cameras (NaTeCam) With 2048 × 2048 resolution, NaTeCam is used to construct topography maps, extract parameters such as slope, undulation and roughness, investigate geological structures, and conduct comprehensive analysis on the geological structure of the surface parameters.

=== Lander ===
The lander did not have a scientific payload, but carried a Mars Emergency Beacon designed to survive the force of a catastrophic crash. The beacon would have allowed critical engineering data to be collected to aid future design. The lander also carried the Chinese flag and 2022 Winter Olympics and Paralympics mascots with it like the orbiter.

=== Other instruments ===
- Tianwen-1 Deployable Cameras, two secondary Payloads deployed in September 2020 in deep space and 31 December 2021 in Mars orbit respectively, that took photos of and tested a radio connection with Tianwen-1. The first camera's mission was to photograph the Tianwen-1 orbiter and the lander's heat shield while the other one had to image the orbiter and Northern Mars Ice Cap from Mars orbit.
- Tianwen-1 Remote Camera, secondary Payload deployed on 1 June 2021 that took photos of and tested a wireless connection with Zhurong rover like the deployable cameras did with orbiter. Its mission was to take a group selfie of the Zhurong rover and the Tianwen-1 lander. The photo was released on 11 June 2021, confirming their Martian landing success.

== Other observations ==
In 2025 Tianwen-1 used its HiRIC camera to image 3I/ATLAS.

== International collaborations ==
Argentina's Comisión Nacional de Actividades Espaciales (CONAE) is collaborating on Tianwen-1 by way of the Espacio Lejano tracking station installed in Las Lajas, Neuquén. The facility played a previous role in China's landing of the Chang'e 4 spacecraft on the far side of the Moon in January 2019.

France's Institut de Recherche en Astrophysique et Planétologie (IRAP) in Toulouse, in France, is collaborating on the Zhurong rover. Sylvestre Maurice of IRAP said:

For their Laser Induced Breakdown Spectroscopy (LIBS) instrument, we have delivered a calibration target that is a French duplicate of a target which is on [NASA's] Curiosity [Mars rover]. The idea is to see how the two datasets compare.

The Austrian Research Promotion Agency (FFG) aided in the development of a magnetometer installed on the Tianwen-1 orbiter. The Space Research Institute of the Austrian Academy of Sciences in Graz has confirmed the group's contribution to the Tianwen-1 magnetometer and helped with the calibration of the flight instrument.

While the Tianwen-1 orbiter will dispense commands to the Zhurong rover, the Mars Express orbiter of the European Space Agency could serve as a backup.

== See also ==
- China National Space Administration (CNSA)
- Chinese space program
  - Chinese Deep Space Network
  - Chinese Lunar Exploration Program – Lunar research program (2004–present)
  - Planetary Exploration of China – Chinese Solar System exploration program
  - Yinghuo-1 – Chinese Mars orbiter, never left Earth orbit
- Astrobiology – Science concerned with life in the universe
- Climate of Mars
- Exploration of Mars
- ESTRACK – Network of space-tracking stations of the European Space Agency
- List of missions to Mars
- Life on Mars – Assessments of possible life on Mars
- Emirates Mars Mission, UAE 2020 Mars mission with its Hope orbiter
- Mars sample-return mission – Mars mission to collect rock and dust samples
