= Rongan =

Rongan may refer to"

- Rong'an County, in Guangxi, China
- Kurun Princess Rong'an (1855-1875), daughter of the Xianfeng Emperor of the Qing Dynasty
