= Maiden flight =

First occasion in which an aircraft or rocket leaves the ground under its own power

The maiden flight, also known as first flight, of an aircraft is the first occasion on which it leaves the ground under its own power. The same term is also used for the first launch of rockets.

In the early days of aviation it could be dangerous, because the exact handling characteristics of the aircraft were generally unknown. The maiden flight of a new type is almost invariably flown by a highly experienced test pilot. Maiden flights are usually accompanied by a chase plane, to verify items like altitude, airspeed, and general airworthiness.

A maiden flight is only one stage in the development of an aircraft type. Unless the type is a pure research aircraft (such as the X-15), the aircraft must be tested extensively to ensure that it delivers the desired performance with an acceptable margin of safety. In the case of civilian aircraft, a new type must be certified by a governing agency (such as the Federal Aviation Administration in the United States) before it can enter operation.

== Notable maiden flights (aircraft) ==
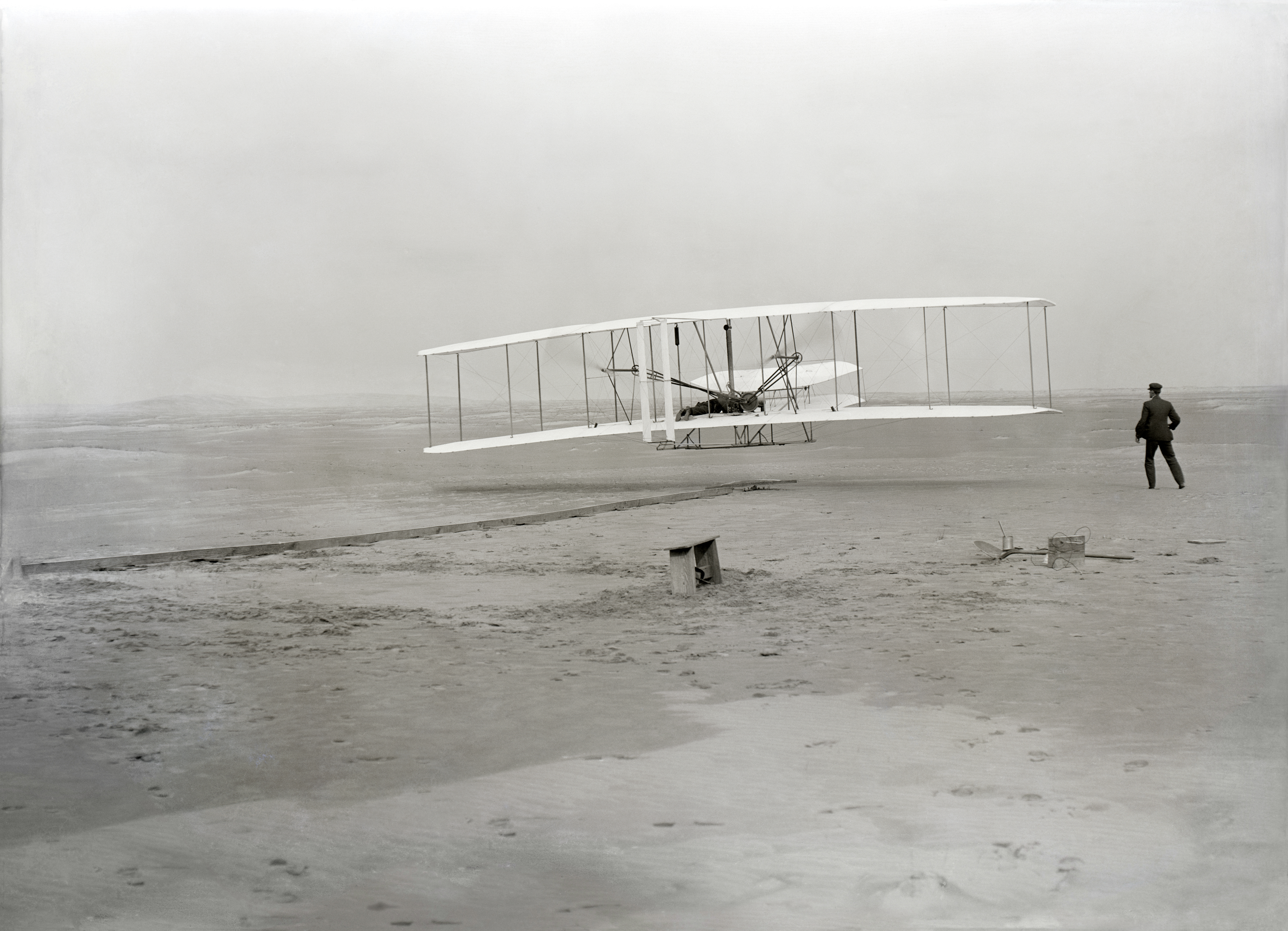
Wright Flyer on December 17, 1903

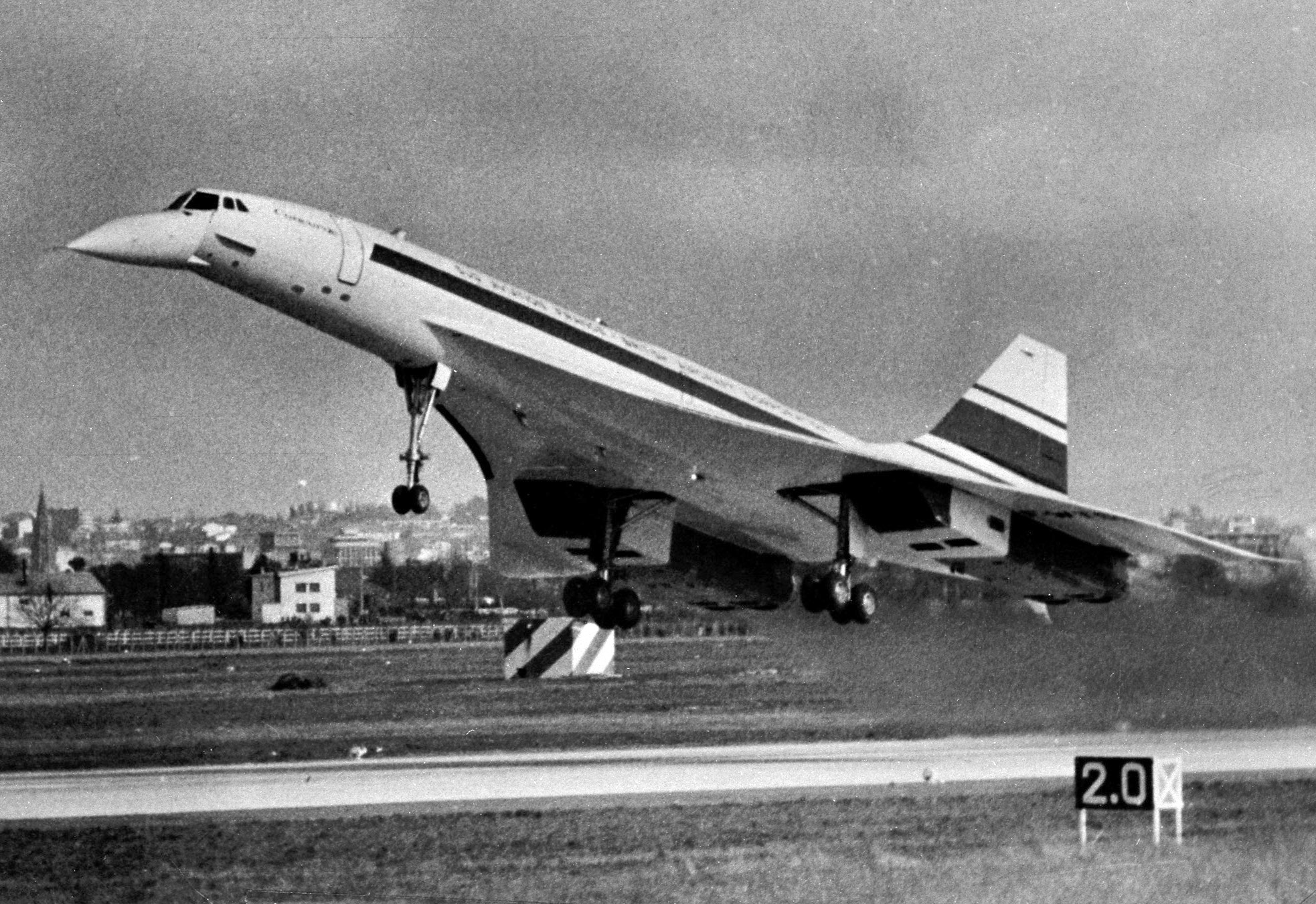
Concorde on March 2, 1969

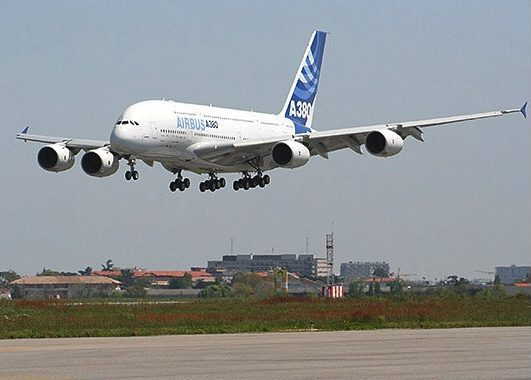
Airbus A380 on April 27, 2005

An incomplete list of maiden flights of notable aircraft types, organized by date, follows.

- June, 1875 – Thomas Moy's Aerial Steamer, London, England (pilotless, tethered)
- October 9, 1890 – Clément Ader – took off from Gretz-Armainvilliers, Ouest of Paris, France.
- August 14, 1901 – Gustave Whitehead from Leutershausen, Bavaria.
- May 15, 1902 – Lyman Gilmore – took off from Grass Valley, California.
- March 31, 1903 – Richard Pearse – took off from Waitohi Flat, Temuka, South Island, New Zealand.
- December 17, 1903 – Wright brothers Wright Flyer – First successful piloted and controlled heavier-than-air powered aircraft; flights took place four miles south of Kitty Hawk, North Carolina.
- March 18, 1906 – Traian Vuia, a Romanian inventor and engineer, who flew 11 meters in his self-named monoplane at Montesson near Paris, France.
- October 23, 1906 – Alberto Santos-Dumont 14-bis made a manned powered flight in Bagatelle Park, Paris, France, that was the first to be publicly witnessed by a crowd.
- July 4, 1908 – Glenn Curtiss flew the first pre-announced public flight in the United States of America of a heavier-than-air flying machine. He flew 5,080 feet, to win the Scientific American Trophy and its $2,500 purse (equivalent to $90,000 in 2025).
- December 22, 1916 – Sopwith Camel – this iconic biplane first took off from Brooklands, Weybridge, Surrey.
- July 28, 1935 – Boeing B-17 Flying Fortress – World War II American heavy bomber.
- December 17, 1935 – Douglas DC-3 – propeller-driven passenger and cargo aircraft of which more than 10,000 were produced.
- December 29, 1939 – Consolidated B-24 – World War II American heavy bomber.
- November 2, 1947 – Hughes H-4 Hercules – only flight of this oversized flying boat whose common name is Spruce Goose.
- July 27, 1949 – de Havilland Comet – first jet airliner.
- August 23, 1954 – Lockheed C-130 Hercules – military transport plane.
- May 27, 1955 – Sud Aviation Caravelle – first jet airliner with engines mounted in the tail.
- March 25, 1958 – Avro Canada CF-105 Arrow – Canadian supersonic fighter interceptor. First non-experimental aircraft designed and equipped with a fly-by-wire flight control system.
- April 25, 1962 – Lockheed A-12 – supersonic reconnaissance aircraft.
- June 29, 1962 – Vickers VC10 – first airliner with 4 engines mounted in the tail.
- April 9, 1967 – Boeing 737 – short-to-medium-range airliner.
- October 4, 1968 – Tupolev Tu-154 – Soviet/Russian airliner, still in operation.
- December 31, 1968 – Tupolev Tu-144 – Soviet supersonic airliner.
- February 9, 1969 – Boeing 747 – first widebody airliner.
- March 2, 1969 – Anglo-French Concorde – supersonic airliner.
- September 19, 1969 – Mil Mi-24 – Russian/Soviet-made helicopter used by many countries to this day.
- October 28, 1972 – Airbus A300 – first Airbus aircraft, short- to medium-range wide-body jet airliner.
- February 22, 1987 – Airbus A320 airliner – first civilian aircraft to have an all-digital fly-by-wire system.
- December 21, 1988 – Antonov An-225 Mriya – jet with the longest fuselage and wingspan and overall heaviest aircraft.
- June 12, 1994 – Boeing 777 – long-range airliner with the most powerful jet engines ever made.
- May 20, 2003 – Scaled Composites SpaceShipOne – The first commercial sub-orbital space craft.
- April 27, 2005 – Airbus A380 – double-decker jet airliner, currently largest capacity in the world, took off from Toulouse–Blagnac Airport.
- December 11, 2009 – Airbus A400M – military cargo plane, Airbus' first propeller plane.
- December 15, 2009 – Boeing 787 Dreamliner – first major widebody airliner to use non-metal composite materials for most of its construction.
- November 11, 2015 – Mitsubishi Regional Jet – Japanese twin-engine regional jet, the first designed and built in Japan, took off from Mitsubishi Heavy Industries, Tokyo.
- May 5, 2017 – Comac C919 – Chinese commercial aircraft.
- April 13, 2019 – Scaled Composites Stratolaunch – The world's largest airplane
- January 25, 2020 – Boeing 777X – The world's longest and largest twin-engine airliner.
- April 19, 2021 – Ingenuity – an unmanned robotic helicopter, first aircraft to fly on Mars.
- July 19, 2022 – KF-21 Boramae - Advanced multirole fighter designed by the Agency for Defense Development (ADD) and Korea Aerospace Industries (KAI).

== Notable maiden flights (rockets) ==
- October 3, 1942 – V-2 rocket made its first successful test flight. The nose cone crossed the Karman line, widely considered the end of Earth's atmosphere, making it the first human-made object to reach space.
- August 3, 1953 – PGM-11 Redstone, designed by Wernher von Braun, was the US's first large ballistic missile. Launched from Cape Canaveral Air Force Station Launch Complex 4, it flew for 80 seconds until an engine failure caused it to crash into the sea.
- October 4, 1957 – Sputnik, first orbital rocket.
- December 22, 1960 – Vostok-K, first human-rated rocket (first manned flight April 12, 1961).
- November 9, 1967 – Saturn V, was used to launch humans to the Moon.
- April 12, 1981 – Space Shuttle, first partially reusable launch system, largest payload at the time of its maiden flight.
- February 15, 1996 – Long March 3B, the Intelsat 708 satellite was onboard instead of a dummy payload. The launch failed.
- December 21, 2004 – Delta IV Heavy, largest payload at the time of its maiden flight.
- February 6, 2018 – Falcon Heavy, largest payload at the time of its maiden flight, partially reusable. The flight carried Elon Musk's Tesla Roadster.
- November 16, 2022 – Space Launch System block 1, carried Artemis I.
- April 20, 2023 – Starship, currently the most powerful launch vehicle.
- January 8, 2024 – Vulcan Centaur, carried Peregrine Mission One.

== See also ==
- Flight test
