= Intelsat 708 =

Chinese failed satellite launch in 1996

- The LM3B veering off after liftoff
- Names: IS 708
- Mission type: Communications
- Operator: Intelsat
- Mission duration: 15 years (planned); Failed to orbit

Spacecraft properties
- Spacecraft type: Intelsat VII-A
- Bus: LS-1300
- Manufacturer: Space Systems/Loral
- Launch mass: 4,180 kg (9,220 lb)

Start of mission
- Launch date: 15 February 1996 03:01:07 (UTC+8)
- Rocket: Long March 3B
- Launch site: Xichang, LC-2
- Contractor: China Great Wall Industry Corporation

Orbital parameters
- Reference system: Geocentric orbit (planned)
- Regime: Geostationary orbit

Transponders
- Band: 26 C-band; 14 Ku-band

Intelsat 708 was a telecommunications satellite constructed by the American company Space Systems/Loral for Intelsat, which was destroyed on 15 February 1996, when its Long March 3B carrier rocket failed during its launch from the Xichang Satellite Launch Center (XSLC) in China. The launch vehicle deviated from its intended trajectory shortly after liftoff and struck a hillside near the main gate of the XSLC, causing damage to buildings on the launch centre's territory and flattening Mayelin Village. The incident resulted in the deaths of at least six people; together with Apstar 2, a similar failed launch at Xichang, it is the deadliest accident of the Chinese space program.

The accident investigation identified a failure in the guidance system of the Long March 3B. After the Intelsat 708 accident, the Long March rockets did not experience another mission failure until 2011. However, the participation of American companies in the Intelsat 708 and Apstar 2 investigations caused political controversy in the United States. A U.S. government investigation found that the information in the accident investigation report had been illegally transferred to China. Satellite technology was subsequently reclassified as a munition and placed under ITAR restrictions, blocking its export to China. In 2002, Space Systems/Loral paid US$20 million to settle charges of violating export controls.

== Background ==
After the 1986 Space Shuttle Challenger disaster, the US Government decided that commercial satellite payloads would not be launched on Space Shuttles, forcing satellite producers to use expendable rocket systems instead. At that time, China also began its entry into the international space market.

In 1992 and 1993, Space Systems/Loral received licenses from the United States Department of State to launch Intelsat satellites on Chinese rockets. At that time, satellite components were still under International Traffic in Arms Regulations (ITAR); they would be transferred in stages to the U.S. Department of Commerce between 1992 and 1996. The Intelsat 708 satellite was to be launched into geostationary orbit aboard a Long March 3B launch vehicle. It was also the maiden flight of the vehicle.

On 21 December 1992, the Optus-B2 satellite was launched into orbit aboard a Long March 2E rocket from the Xichang Satellite Launch Center (XSLC). 45 seconds after liftoff, the rocket's fairing with the payload inside had collapsed, damaging the satellite. However, the damaged satellite debris was still transported into orbit, and tracking stations managed to receive signals from the spacecraft after several days.

On 26 January 1995, the Apstar 2 satellite was launched from the XSLC on board a Long March 2E launch vehicle. After flying for 51 seconds, the vehicle suddenly erupted into flames and exploded, the debris falling on nearby villages. Chinese officials stated that as the result of the failure, 6 villagers died and 23 were injured. It was later found that the cause of the failure was the payload fairing collapsing mid-flight due to structural deficiency. Chinese officials, however, blamed the satellite for the failure. After the incident, Intelsat and SSL officials forbade employees from observing launches from the roof of the hotel building, a decision that may have prevented further fatalities.

Mayelin village was created in the 1950s. The village bordered the launch center's main gate. In 1980 it was abolished for unknown reasons, however the village was later reestablished. At the moment of the Intelsat 708 launch, approximately 1000 or fewer people may have lived in the village. Mayelin village was mostly populated by the Yi people and local farmers. The village was located between the launch center's main gate and the nearby town of Mayelin (commonly mistaken with the village). Villages close to XSLC had been evacuated since the early 1980s according to the Chinese government.

== Launch and the subsequent failure ==
The launch was planned for 02:51 on 15 February 1996 (18:01 the preceding day UTC), before being moved to 03:00 as this was seen to be a "luckier" number. The launch window opened at 02:51 and the countdown began around 02:56. The launch was being broadcast on CCTV-1 in China and the live feed from the launch pad was being transmitted to the headquarters of Space Systems/Loral. Lift-off occurred at 03:01:07, and only two seconds later the rocket unexpectedly began to incline toward the east. The rocket flew over the umbilical tower and started turning horizontal in the air while flying towards the residential area of XSLC. 22 seconds later, the rocket was remotely detonated; seconds later, it hit a hillside and its propellant ignited into a massive explosion.

The shockwave of the explosion destroyed windows in nearby buildings and in the Technical Center of XSLC, where American engineers were observing the launch. The Americans were kept inside a warehouse in the Technical Center, with the air conditioning turned off and safety equipment given to them, until 06:00, when a bus arrived at the Technical Center to take the engineers back to Xichang. The incident resulted in the deaths of at least six people.

== Aftermath ==
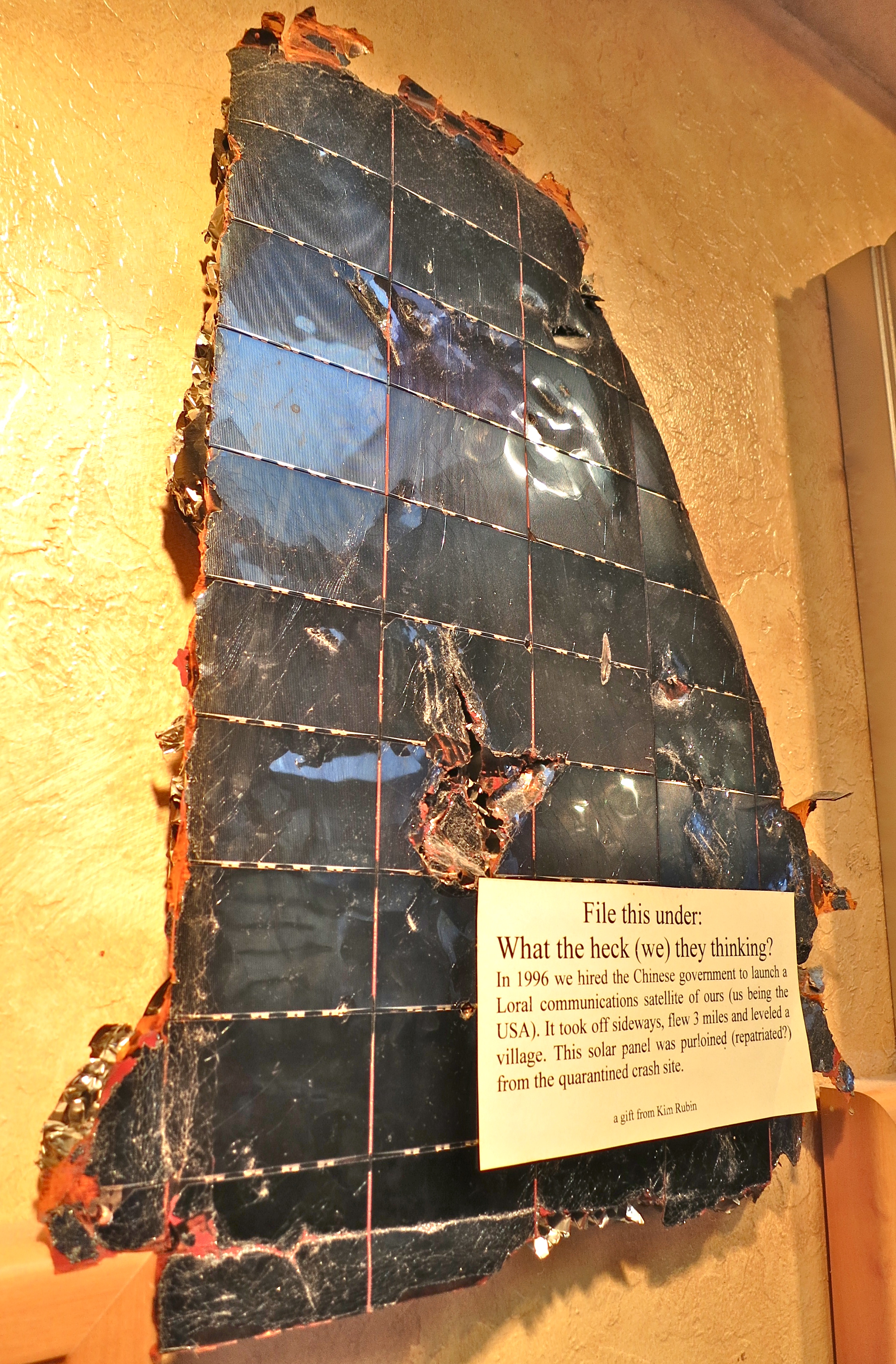
Part of the wreckage, a solar panel, is now on display at Buck's Restaurant.

American engineers that were still at XSLC were gathered up and tasked with collecting satellite debris that was scattered all around the area after the blast, for it to be shipped back to the US and to prevent the Chinese from collecting sensitive components. It was later determined that encryption devices were not recovered from the crash site. However the satellite was surprisingly intact even after the explosion.

The nature and extent of the damage still remain a subject of dispute. The Chinese government, through its official Xinhua news agency, reported that six people were killed and 57 injured. Western media speculated that between a few dozen and 500 people might have been killed in the crash; "dozens, if not hundreds" of people were seen to gather outside the center's main gate near the crash site the night before launch. Western media also backed this claim up with recordings taken after the crash showcasing the nearby village that had almost been completely destroyed by the explosion. A 2003 CCTV documentary on the Chinese space program named "Shaking the Heavens" stated that 7 people died, while a 2012 documentary on the 50 launches of the Long March 3A included a statement made by Liang Xiaohong, the party head of CALT:

I would like to take this opportunity to lament Comrade Qian Zhiying and Yang Linzhen who died in the line of duty on 15 February 1996,

This was the first time the name of the dead were revealed.

The state-run Xinhua News Agency published a newsflash on the 15th of February 1996, stating;

At 3:01 today, our country's newly developed Long March 3B carrier rocket failed to launch the Intelsat 708 communication satellite in Xichang Satellite Launch Center. It was the maiden flight of this launch vehicle. The parties concerned are investigating this accident.

Approximately 80 houses were destroyed in Mayelin Village, with Bruce Campbell stating that "Every house for several hundred meters was leveled". This has been attributed to the houses in Mayelin being built out of poor materials.

Some eyewitnesses were noted as having seen dozens of ambulances and many flatbed trucks, loaded with what could have been human remains, being taken to the local hospital. However the trucks may have actually been loaded with documents from the Coordination Building.

Bruce Campbell of Astrotech and other American eyewitnesses in Xichang reported that the official death toll only reflected those in the military who were caught by the disaster and not the civilian population. However, Chen Lan writing in The Space Review later said the total population of the village was under 1000, and that most if not all of the population had been evacuated before launch as had been common practice since the 1980s, making it "very unlikely" that there were hundreds of deaths.

On the 2nd of March 1996, Xinhua News Agency published more details on the failure;

According to analysis and interpretation of telemetry data, it is considered that the accident was caused by changes of inertial baseline after lift-off. The particular cause is to be further analyzed and verified… At 3:01 on 15 February, our country's newly developed Long March 3B carrier rocket lifted off. Anomaly in flight attitude appeared about two seconds later. The rocket pitched down and went right off the flight path. About 22 seconds later, the rocket crashed with nose down and exploded violently. Both the rocket and the satellite were lost. There were no large debris on the site… Up to today, 49 of 57 wounded have been cured and discharged from hospital and 8 are still in hospital. Arrangement has been made for the 6 dead. Checkout and testing shows that launch and testing capability of the Xichang Satellite Launch Center was not affected… It is able to resume normal operation at beginning of March. More than 80 local houses nearby the launch center were damaged. The launch center and the local government provided temporary housing and relief fund to the victims… Except for short time pollution at the explosion site and in air, water source, plant and food were not polluted… China Great Wall has informed all customers and the international insurance industry progress of the investigation. On 28 February, Intelsat was invited to participate in the investigation.

Suspicions emerged in the West when on 23/24 March 1996, Channel 2 broadcast a recording of the aftermath of the disaster, recorded by an Israeli engineer present at the launch center. The recording showcased severe damage to the residential area of XSLC and Mayelin Village. The Chinese government later denied the presence of an Israeli on-site during the launch of Intelsat-708. After the tape was aired, China allegedly revised the casualty number to 56, however nowadays Chinese officials still state that there were only 6 casualties.

The village of Mayelin that used to border the launch center was still present near the launch center in 1997, however after 1997 it was demolished, with its inhabitants being relocated to other settlements nearby for their safety.

== Investigation ==
After the launch failure, the Chinese investigation found that the inertial measurement unit had failed because of a faulty wire. However, the satellite insurance companies insisted on an Independent Review Committee (IRC) as a condition of providing insurance for future Chinese satellite launches. Loral, Hughes, and other U.S. aerospace companies participated in the Review Committee, which issued a report in May 1996 that identified a different cause of the failure in the inertial measurement unit. The cause of failure was a poorly soldered gold-aluminium bonding point inside the inertial measurement unit. The Chinese report was then changed to match the findings of the Review Committee. The Long March rocket family did not experience another mission failure until August 2011 when a Long March 2C failed carrying the Shijian 11-04 satellite.

In 1997, the U.S. Defense Technology Security Administration found that China had obtained "significant benefit" from the Review Committee and could improve their "launch vehicles ... ballistic missiles and in particular their guidance systems". In 1998, the U.S. Congress reclassified satellite technology as a munition that was subject to ITAR, returning export control from the Commerce Department to the State Department. In 2002, Loral paid US$20 million in fines and compliance expenses to settle allegations of violating export control regulations.

No export licenses to China have been issued since 1996. An official at the Bureau of Industry and Security emphasized in 2016 that "no U.S.-origin content, regardless of significance, regardless of whether it's incorporated into a foreign-made item, can go to China".

Intelsat 708 contained sophisticated communications and encryption technology. Members of the Loral security team searched the toxic environment around the crash site to recover sensitive components, returning with complaints of bulging eyes and severe headaches requiring oxygen therapy. The Chinese government never elaborated on whether this could be an issue to local villagers in the future, however. They were initially reported by the U.S. Department of Defense monitor to have succeeded in recovering "the [satellite's] encryption-decryption equipment". The most sensitive FAC-3R circuit boards were not recovered, but "were mounted near the hydrazine propellant tanks and most likely were destroyed in the explosion... Because the FAC-3R boards on Intelsat 708 were uniquely keyed, the National Security Agency (NSA) remains convinced that there is no risk to other satellite systems, now or in the future, resulting from having not recovered the FAC-3R boards from the PRC".

== See also ==
- Nedelin disaster – a launch catastrophe at the Baikonur test range in the Soviet Union.
- Proton-M/DM-03 8K82 km/11S861-03 – a Proton launch vehicle that went out of control and flew horizontally before crashing.
