= YF-20 =

Chinese rocket engine

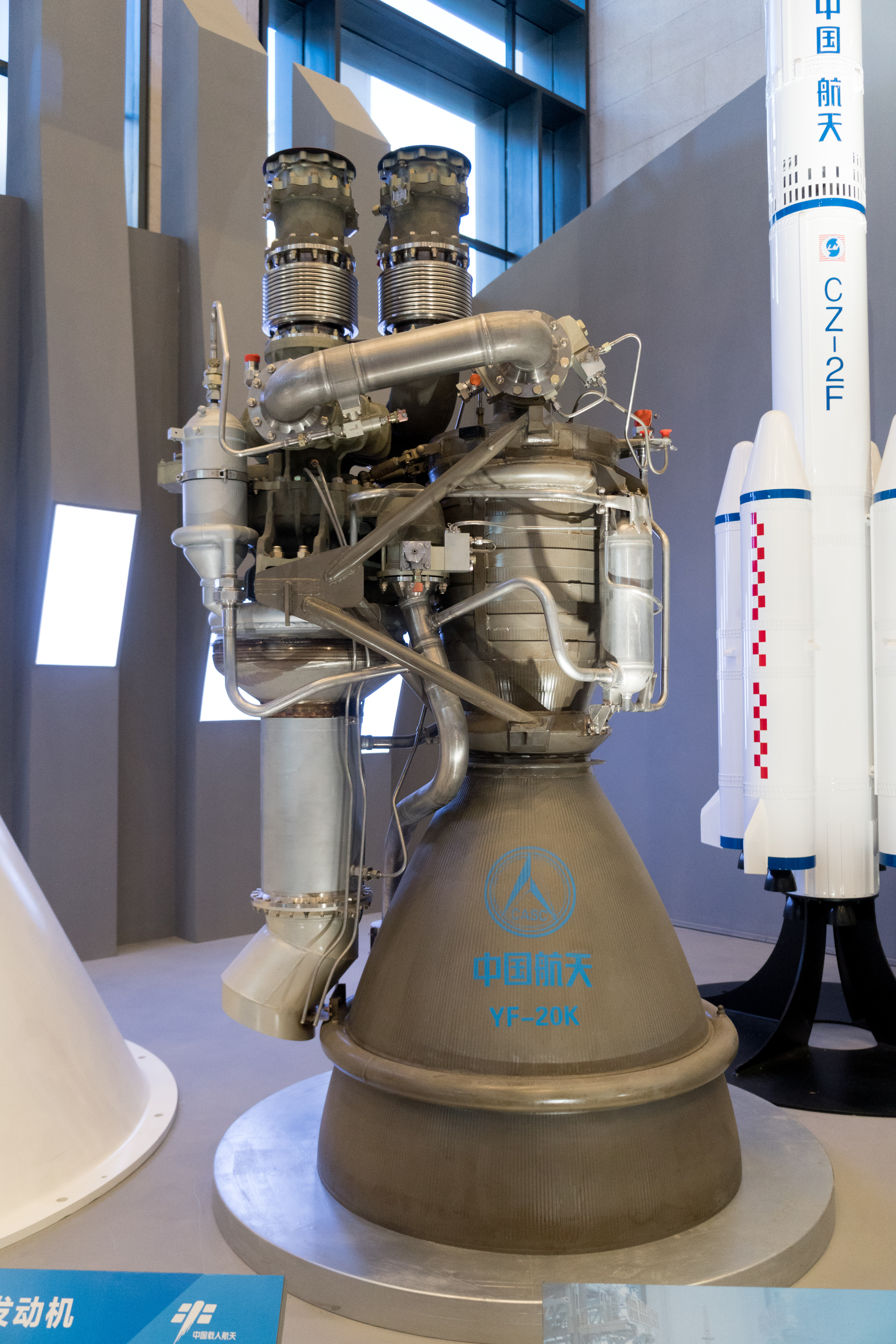
- A YF-20K engine
- Country of origin: China
- First flight: 1995-06-01
- Designer: Academy of Aerospace Liquid Propulsion Technology
- Associated LV: Feng Bao 1, Long March 2, Long March 3 and Long March 4
- Status: In Production

Liquid-fuel engine
- Propellant: N_{2}O_{4} / UDMH
- Cycle: Gas Generator

Configuration
- Chamber: 1
- Nozzle ratio: 12.69

Performance
- Thrust, vacuum: 816.3 kN (183,500 lbf)
- Thrust, sea-level: 731.5 kN (164,400 lbf)
- Chamber pressure: 7.1 MPa (1,030 psi)
- Specific impulse, vacuum: 289 seconds (2.83 km/s)
- Specific impulse, sea-level: 259 seconds (2.54 km/s)
- Burn time: 160s
- Gimbal range: ±10° (when integrated on the YF-21B)

Dimensions
- Diameter: 84 centimetres (33 in)
- Dry mass: 712.5 kg (1,571 lb)

Used in
- Feng Bao 1 first stage and Long March 2C, Long March 2D, Long March 2E, Long March 3, Long March 3A, Long March 3B and Long March 4A, boosters, first stage and second stage.

The YF-20 is a Chinese liquid-fuel rocket engine burning N_{2}O_{4} and UDMH in a gas generator cycle. It is a basic engine which when mounted in a four engine module forms the YF-21. The high altitude variation is known as the YF-22 is normally paired with the YF-23 vernier to form the YF-24 propulsion module for second stages. New versions when used individually for booster applications are called YF-25.

== Versions ==
The basic engine has been used since the Feng Bao 1 rocket and has been the main propulsion of the Long March 2, Long March 3 and Long March 4 families.

- YF-20: Core engine. Flown originally on the Feng Bao 1 and Long March 2A.
- YF-20A: Core engine.
- YF-20B (a.k.a. DaFY5-1): Core engine, also used on the boosters.
- YF-20C: Core engine, also used on the boosters.
- YF-20D: Core engine, also used on the boosters.
- YF-20E: Core engine, also used on the boosters.
- YF-22: Upper stage version with enlarged nozzle are ratio. Flown originally on the Feng Bao 1 second stage with no verniers, and on the Long March 2A with the YF-23 verniers as the YF-24.
- YF-22A: Upper stage version.
- YF-22B (a.k.a. DaFY20-1): Upper stage version.
- YF-22C: Upper stage version.
- YF-22D: Upper stage version.
- YF-22E: Upper stage version.
- YF-25: Booster stage version.

== Modules ==
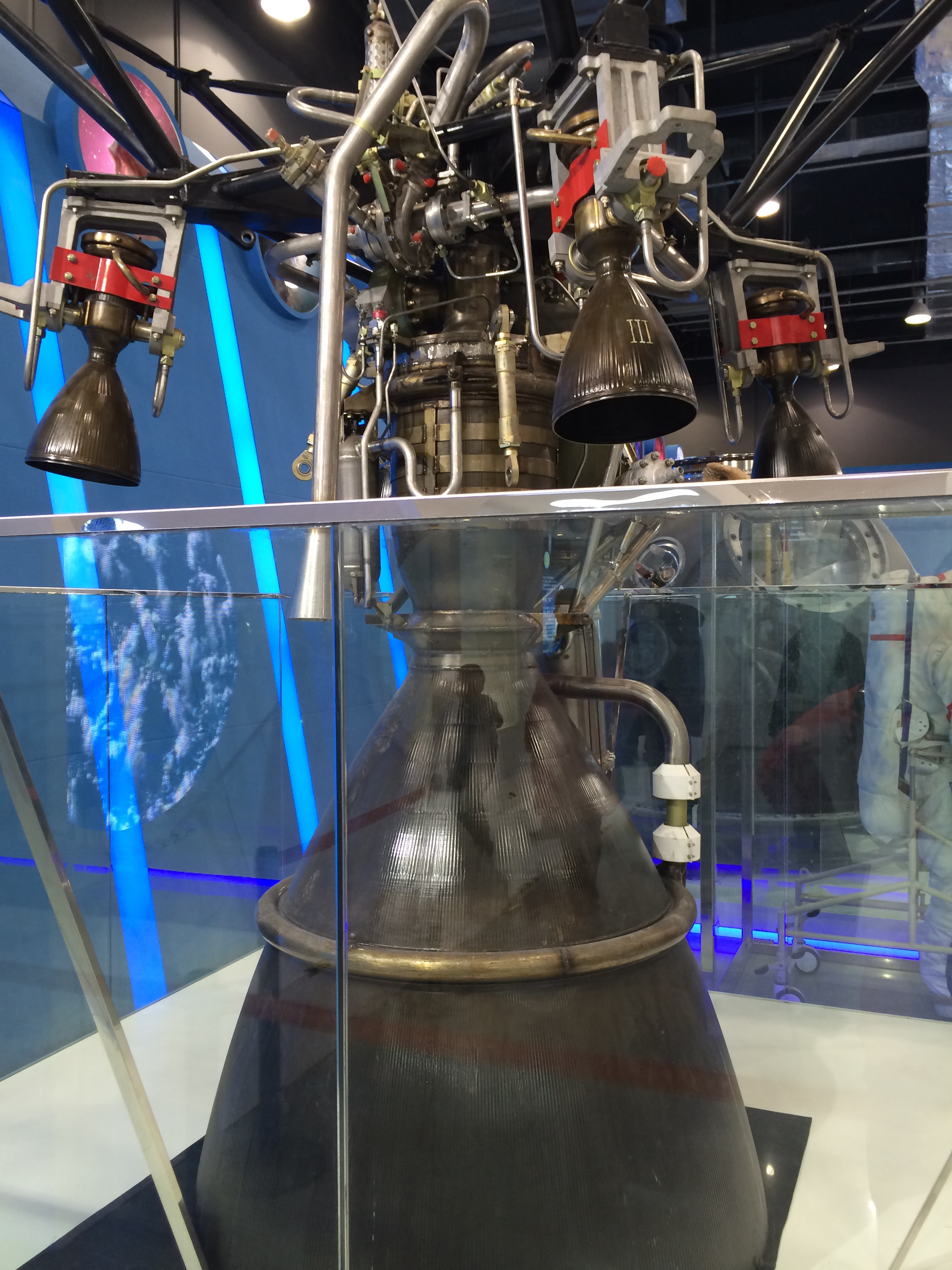
A YF-24B engine

While the basic engine was used multiple times, it was only used as a single engine for booster application. It is usually bundled into modules of multiple engines.

The relevant modules for first stage application are:

- YF-21: A module comprising four YF-20. Flown originally on the Feng Bao 1 and Long March 2A.
- YF-21A: A module comprising four YF-20A. Improved version.
- YF-21B (a.k.a. DaFY6-2): A module comprising four YF-20B. Improved version which increased thrust by 7%.
- YF-21C: A module comprising four YF-20C. Improved version.
- YF-21D: A module comprising four YF-20D. Improved version.
- YF-21E: A module comprising four YF-20E. Improved version.

The relevant modules for second stage application are:

- YF-24: A module comprising an YF-22 and a YF-23 vernier. First flown on the Long March 2A.
- YF-24A: A module comprising an YF-22A and a YF-23A verniers.
- YF-24B: A module comprising an YF-22B and a YF-23B verniers.
- YF-24C: A module comprising an YF-22C and a YF-23C verniers.
- YF-24D: A module comprising an YF-22D and a YF-23D verniers.
- YF-24E: A module comprising an YF-22E and a YF-23E verniers.
