= AsiaSat 2 =

AsiaSat communications satellite

- Names: AMOS-5i
- Mission type: Communications
- Operator: AsiaSat (1995–2009, 2012); Spacecom (2009–2011)
- COSPAR ID: 1995-064A
- SATCAT no.: 23723
- Website: https://www.asiasat.com
- Mission duration: 13 years (planned); 16 years (achieved)

Spacecraft properties
- Spacecraft: AsiaSat-2
- Spacecraft type: AS-7000
- Bus: Lockheed Martin AS-7000
- Manufacturer: Lockheed Martin Astro Space
- Launch mass: 3,379 kg (7,449 lb)

Start of mission
- Launch date: 28 November 1995, 11:30:05 UTC
- Rocket: Long March 2E / FG-46
- Launch site: Xichang, LA-2
- Contractor: CGWIC
- Entered service: January 1996

End of mission
- Disposal: Graveyard orbit
- Deactivated: May 2012

Orbital parameters
- Reference system: Geocentric orbit
- Regime: Geostationary orbit
- Longitude: 100.5° East (1995–2009); 17° East (2009–2010); 120° East (2012)

Transponders
- Band: 34 transponders: 26 C-band; 8 Ku-band
- Coverage area: Asia, Pacific Ocean

AsiaSat 2 was a Hong Kong communications satellite, which was owned, and was initially operated, by the Hong Kong–based Asia Satellite Telecommunications Company. It was positioned in geostationary orbit at a longitude of 17° East of the Greenwich Meridian, on lease to Spacecom. It spent most of its operational life at 100.5° East, from where it was used to provide fixed satellite services, including broadcasting, audio and data transmission, to Asia and the Pacific Ocean.

== Satellite description ==
AsiaSat 2 was built by Astro Space, which by the time of its launch had become part of Lockheed Martin. It is based on the AS-7000 satellite bus. At launch, it had a mass of 3,379 kg (7,449 lb), and a design life of thirteen years. It carries twenty six C-band and eight Ku-band transponders.

== Launch ==
The launch of AsiaSat 2 was contracted to the China Great Wall Industry Corporation (CGWIC), and used a Long March 2E launch vehicle with a FG-46 upper stage. It was the maiden flight of the FG-46, and the first Chinese launch since the Apstar 2 failure, which killed a number of villagers in January 1995. The launch was conducted from Xichang Launch Area 2 (LA-2) at the Xichang Satellite Launch Centre at 11:30:05 UTC on 28 November 1995. The launch had previously been delayed twice, first from December 1994 due to the failure of Telstar 402, which was based on the same satellite bus as AsiaSat 2, and subsequently whilst the Apstar 2 launch failure was investigated.

Since the Long March 2E launch vehicle had experienced two failures in five launches, AsiaSat 2 had to pay a 27% premium for satellite insurance instead of the usual 17–20%. Although the satellite was delivered to the correct orbit, the launch was a partial failure. Excessive acceleration during the launch caused a misalignment of the antenna feed horns on the Ku-band transponders, reducing the satellite's coverage area. AsiaSat filed an insurance claim for US$58 million.

== AMOS-5i ==
AsiaSat 2 was replaced by AsiaSat 5 in 2009, and in September 2009 it was leased to Israeli operator Spacecom Ltd. It was subsequently moved to a longitude of 17° East, and in January 2010 it began operations for Spacecom, who refer to it as AMOS-5i. Spacecom intended to operate it until AMOS-5 was launched in 2011, however during a stationkeeping manoeuvre in August 2010 they discovered that it was carrying less fuel than they had expected, meaning that it would have to be retired before the launch of its replacement.

== See also ==
- AMOS-1
- AMOS-2
- AMOS-3
