= Long March 2A =

Chinese carrier rocket used in the 1970s

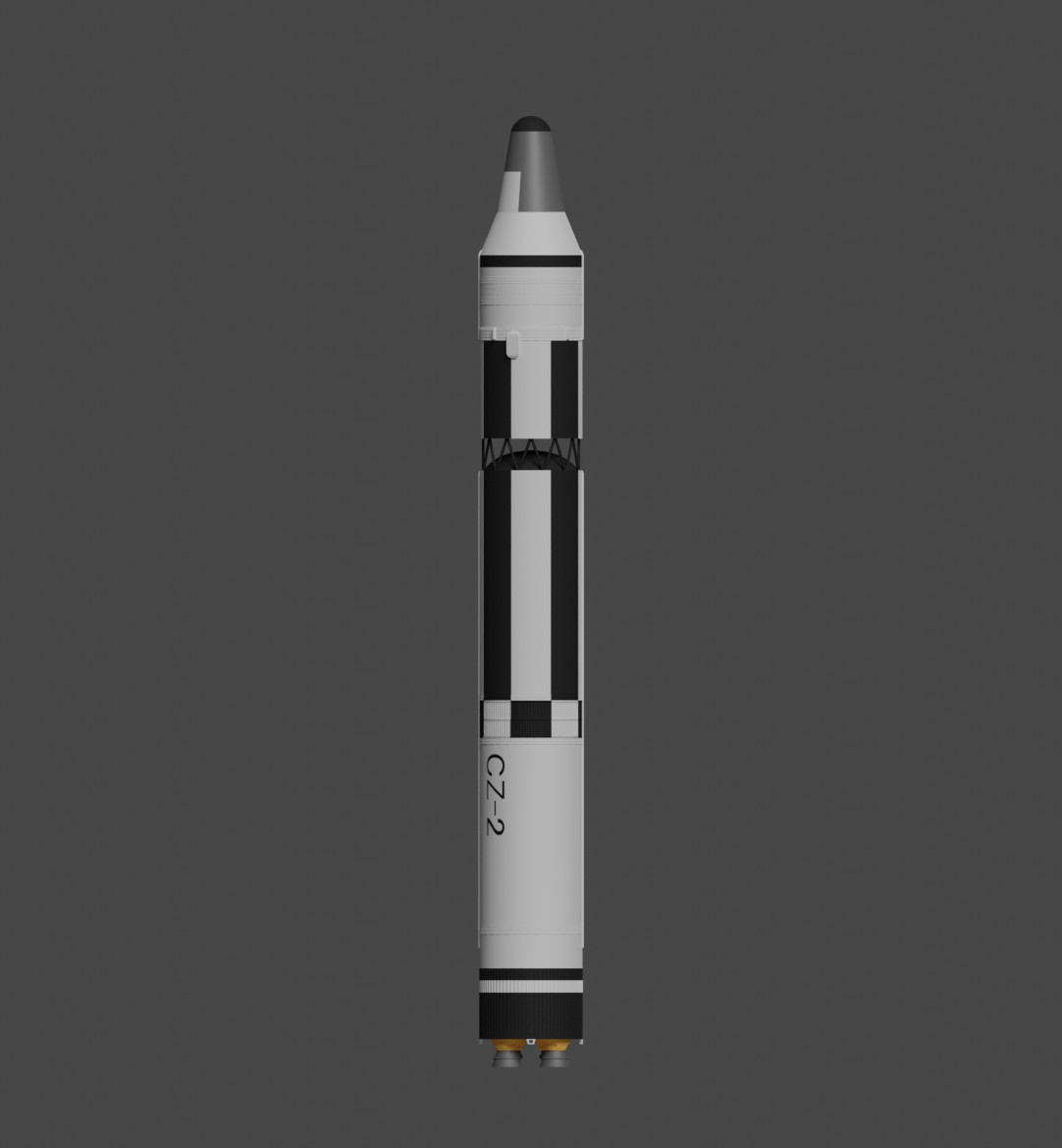
- Long March 2A
- Function: Carrier rocket
- Manufacturer: CALT
- Country of origin: China

Size
- Height: 32 metres (105 ft)
- Diameter: 3.35 metres (11.0 ft)
- Mass: 190,000 kilograms (420,000 lb)
- Stages: 2

Capacity

Payload to LEO
- Mass: 2,000 kilograms (4,400 lb)

Associated rockets
- Family: Long March
- Derivative work: Long March 2C, 2E, 2F

Launch history
- Status: Retired
- Launch sites: LA-2/138, JSLC
- Total launches: 4
- Success(es): 3
- Failure: 1
- First flight: 5 November 1974
- Last flight: 26 January 1978

The Long March 2A, also known as the Chang Zheng 2A, CZ-2A and LM-2A, was a Chinese orbital carrier rocket that launched FSW-0 reconnaissance satellites. It was later replaced by the more capable Long March 4C. It was developed by the China Academy of Launch Vehicle Technology (CALT).

It launched from Launch Area 2B at the Jiuquan Satellite Launch Centre in China. It was a 2-stage rocket that flew four times. On its first flight on 5 November 1974, a cable connecting the pitch rate control gyroscope to the guidance system became disconnected, resulting in a loss of control and launch failure.

== Design ==
The Long March 2 family was created by adapting the DF-5 ICBM for orbital launches. The Long March 2A's first stage was powered by four YF-20 engines, and its second stage used a single YF-22 main engine with four YF-23 vernier engines for attitude control. The rocket was about 31 m long, had a launch mass of about 190,000 kg and could place roughly 1,800 kg into low Earth orbit.

== History ==
The rocket's role was to launch FSW-0 (Fanhui Shi Weixing, "recoverable satellite") spacecraft, which orbited for several days taking high-resolution photographs before releasing a reentry capsule that was recovered on land. After the failed maiden flight on 5 November 1974, the second flight launched FSW-0 1 on 26 November 1975, at 03:27:52 UTC from Launch Area 2B at Jiuquan, according to Gunter's Space Page and other sources, which give this date rather than 16 November. The third flight, carrying FSW-0 2, followed on 7 December 1976, and the final flight, with FSW-0 3, took place on 26 January 1978. All of the rocket's flights used the same Jiuquan launch complex, LC-2/138.

== List of launches ==
Flight number	Date (UTC)	Launch site	Payload	Orbit	Result
1	November 5, 1974; 09:40	LA-2/138, JSLC	FSW-0 No.0	LEO	Failure
2	November 16, 1975; 03:29	LA-2/138, JSLC	FSW-0 No.1	LEO	Success
3	December 7, 1976; 04:38	LA-2/138, JSLC	FSW-0 No.2	LEO	Success
4	January 26, 1978; 04:58	LA-2/138, JSLC	FSW-0 No.3	LEO	Success
