= Feng Bao 1 =

Chinese carrier rocket

- Function: Carrier rocket
- Manufacturer: Shanghai Bureau №2
- Country of origin: China

Size
- Height: 33 metres (108 ft)
- Diameter: 3.35 metres (11.0 ft)
- Mass: 191,700 kilograms (422,600 lb)
- Stages: Two

Capacity

Payload to LEO
- Mass: 2,500 kilograms (5,500 lb)

Launch history
- Status: Retired
- Launch sites: Jiuquan LA-2B
- Total launches: 11
- Success(es): 7
- Failure: 4
- First flight: 10 August 1972
- Last flight: 19 September 1981
- Carries passengers or cargo: JSSW

First stage
- Powered by: 4 YF-20A
- Maximum thrust: 3,000 kilonewtons (670,000 lb_{f})
- Specific impulse: 289 sec
- Burn time: 128 seconds
- Propellant: N_{2}O_{4} / UDMH

Second stage
- Powered by: 1 YF-22; 4 YF-23
- Maximum thrust: 761.9 kilonewtons (171,300 lb_{f})
- Specific impulse: 295 sec
- Burn time: 127 seconds
- Propellant: N_{2}O_{4} / UDMH

The Feng Bao 1 (Chinese: 风暴; lit. 'Storm'), also known as FB-1, was a Chinese carrier rocket launched between 1972 and 1981. It was replaced by the nearly identical Long March 2, which had been developed at the same time for political reasons related to China's Cultural Revolution.

The Feng Bao was derived from the DF-5 missile. Eleven were launched, of which four failed. Launches occurred from LA-2B at the Jiuquan Satellite Launch Centre.

== Launch history ==
Flight no.	Date/time (GMT)	S/N	Payload	Outcome	Remarks
1	10 August 1972; 00:32	701-02	Shiyan Peizhong	Success	Suborbital test, apogee: 200 kilometres
2	18 September 1973; 12:12	701-03	JSSW-1	Failure	
3	12 July 1974; 13:55	701-04	JSSW-2	Failure	Loss of attitude control
4	26 July 1975; 13:28	701-05	JSSW-3	Success	
5	16 December 1975; 09:19	701-06	JSSW-4	Success	
6	30 August 1976; 11:53	701-07	JSSW-5	Success	
7	10 November 1976; 09:05	701-08	JSSW-6	Failure	
8	14 September 1977; 00:15	701(II)-01	DDDS	Success	Suborbital test, apogee: 200 kilometres
9	16 April 1978; 16:39	701(II)-02	DDDS	Success	Suborbital test, apogee: 200 kilometres
10	27 July 1979; 21:28	XCZ-1-02	Shijian 1	Failure	Second stage malfunction
11	19 September 1981; 21:28:40	XCZ-1-02	Shijian 2 Shijian 2A; Shijian 2B	Success	

== See also ==
- List of Long March rocket launches
