= Long March 2 =

Chinese family of rockets

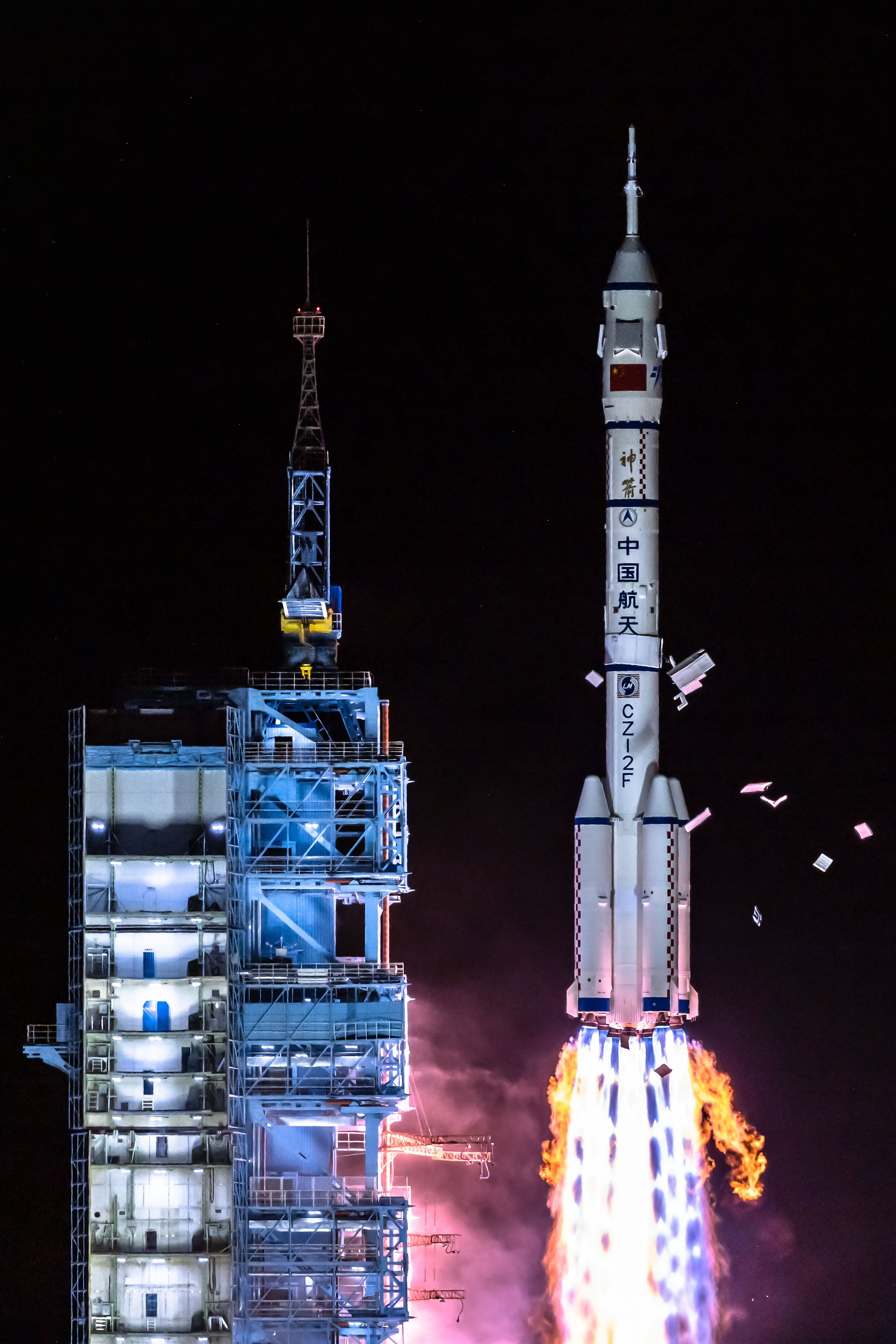
A Long March 2F carries Shenzhou 13, Jiuquan Satellite Launch Center, 2021.

Long March 2 (长征二号, Chángzhēng èr hào, CZ-2, DoD: CSL-2) is a family of multistage hypergolic expendable launch systems developed by the China Academy of Launch Vehicle Technology (CALT). The rockets use the abbreviations LM-2 family for export, and CZ-2 family within China, as "Chang Zheng" means "Long March" in Chinese pinyin. They are part of the larger Long March rocket family.

The human-rated Long March 2F variant launches from Jiuquan Satellite Launch Center, and has carried every crewed Chinese spaceflight via the Shenzhou spacecraft. It has also carried the Chinese reusable experimental spacecraft military spaceplane and a 2F/G derivative launched the Tiangong-1 and Tiangong-2 prototype space stations of the Tiangong program.

== History ==
Long March 2 was the original model in the Long March 2 rocket family, which was derived from China's first ICBM, the DF-5. The development work began in 1970. The first rocket was launched on November 5, 1974, but the launch failed. After the failed first launch of Long March 2, its design was slightly modified and designated as Long March 2A. Long March 2A was successfully launched in 1975. The production of the Long March 2A ended in 1979.

Long March 2C and Long March 2D's first launches occurred in 1982 and 1992 respectively.

The Long March 2E was the first in the Long March rocket family to introduce liquid rocket boosters, as well as a solid rocket perigee kick stage, to improve its GTO payload capacity to satisfy the domestic and international launch market in the 1990s. It was first launched in 1992. However, the Long March 2E had problems with excessive vibration, destroying the Optus B2 and Apstar 2 satellites and damaging AsiaSat 2. After 2 failures and 1 partial failure, the Long March 2E was withdrawn from the market after just 5 years in operation.

The development of Long March 2F began in 1992 as a human-rated version of the Long March 2E. Its first launch was in November 1999 (See also Shenzhou 1). This version is the safest model in the Long March 2 family, with 11 launches and no failure record. An unmanned derivative called Long March 2F/G carries the bulkier Tiangong space laboratories.

Long March 2D and Long March 4 were developed by the Shanghai Academy of Space Flight Technology (SAST), while all others are developed by CALT.

=== Long March 3 ===
The designations Long March 2A and Long March 2B were originally applied to design studies of Long March 2 derivatives for geostationary payloads. Long March 2A would use a cryogenic third stage, and Long March 2B a hypergolic one. Neither design was finalized. The 2A design was adopted as the Long March 3.

== Specifications ==
Specifications
Series	2A	2C	2D	2E	2F
Image	Long March 2A	Long March 2C	Long March 2D	Long March 2E	Long March 2F
Stages	2	2	2	3 (+4 boosters)	2 (+4 boosters)
Length	31.170 m (102.26 ft)	35.150 m (115.32 ft)	33.667 m (110.46 ft)	49.686 m (163.01 ft)	62 m (203 ft)
Diameter (core)	3.35 m (11.0 ft)				
Liftoff mass	190 t (420,000 lb)	192 t (423,000 lb)	232 t (511,000 lb)	462 t (1,019,000 lb)	464 t (1,023,000 lb)
Liftoff thrust	2,786 kN (626,000 lb_{f})	2,786 kN (626,000 lb_{f})	2,962 kN (666,000 lb_{f})	5,923 kN (1,332,000 lb_{f})	6,512 kN (1,464,000 lb_{f})
Payload to LEO	1,800 kg (4,000 lb)	2,400 kg (5,300 lb)	3,100 kg (6,800 lb)	9,200 kg (20,300 lb)	8,400 kg (18,500 lb)

== Launch history ==
The following launch statistics are gathered from the individual Wikipedia pages of each CZ-2x variants as those pages are updated more frequently by various editors; the numbers are current as of 14 May, 2025.

Long March 2 (rocket family)
Derivatives	Status	First flight	Launches	Successes	Failures	Partial Failures
Long March 2	Retired	5 November 1974	1	0	1	0
Long March 2A	Retired	26 November 1975	3	3	0	0
Long March 2C	Active	9 September 1982	84	82	1	1
Long March 2D	Active	9 August 1992	101	100	0	1
Long March 2E	Retired	16 July 1990	7	4	1	2
Long March 2F	Active	19 November 1999	27	27	0	0

=== Launches by rocket configurations ===
==== 1970–2009 ====
- Long March 2/2A
- Long March 2C
- Long March 2D
- Long March 2E
- Long March 2F

==== 2010–2025 ====
- Long March 2C
- Long March 2D
- Long March 2F
