= YF-23 (rocket engine) =

Chinese rocket engine

YF-23E
- Country of origin: China
- First flight: 1974-11-05
- Designer: Academy of Aerospace Liquid Propulsion Technology
- Application: Vernier engine
- Associated LV: Feng Bao 1, Long March 2, Long March 3 and Long March 4
- Status: In Production

Liquid-fuel engine
- Propellant: N_{2}O_{4} / UDMH
- Mixture ratio: 1.57

Configuration
- Chamber: 4

Performance
- Thrust, vacuum: 47.1 kN (10,600 lbf)
- Specific impulse, vacuum: 297 seconds (2.91 km/s)
- Burn time: 300s

Used in
- Long March 2F, Long March 3A, Long March 3B, Long March 3C, Long March 4B and Long March 4C second stage.

The YF-23 is a liquid rocket vernier engine, burning N_{2}O_{4} and UDMH. It is used in along the YF-22 to form the YF-24 and YF-25 propulsion modules.

== Versions ==
The basic engine has been used since the Feng Bao 1 rocket and has been the vernier propulsion of the Long March 2, Long March 3 and Long March 4 families second stage.

- YF-23: Original version.
- YF-23B (AKA DaFY21-1): Improved version.
- YF-23F: Improved version.

== Modules ==
This engine is bundled into modules along the YF-22 upper stage engine.

The relevant modules for second stage application are:

- YF-24: A module comprising an YF-22 and a single YF-23 verniers.
- YF-24B: A module comprising an YF-22B and a single YF-23B verniers.
- YF-24E: A module comprising an YF-22E and a single YF-23F verniers.
