= Long March 2E =

Chinese rocket

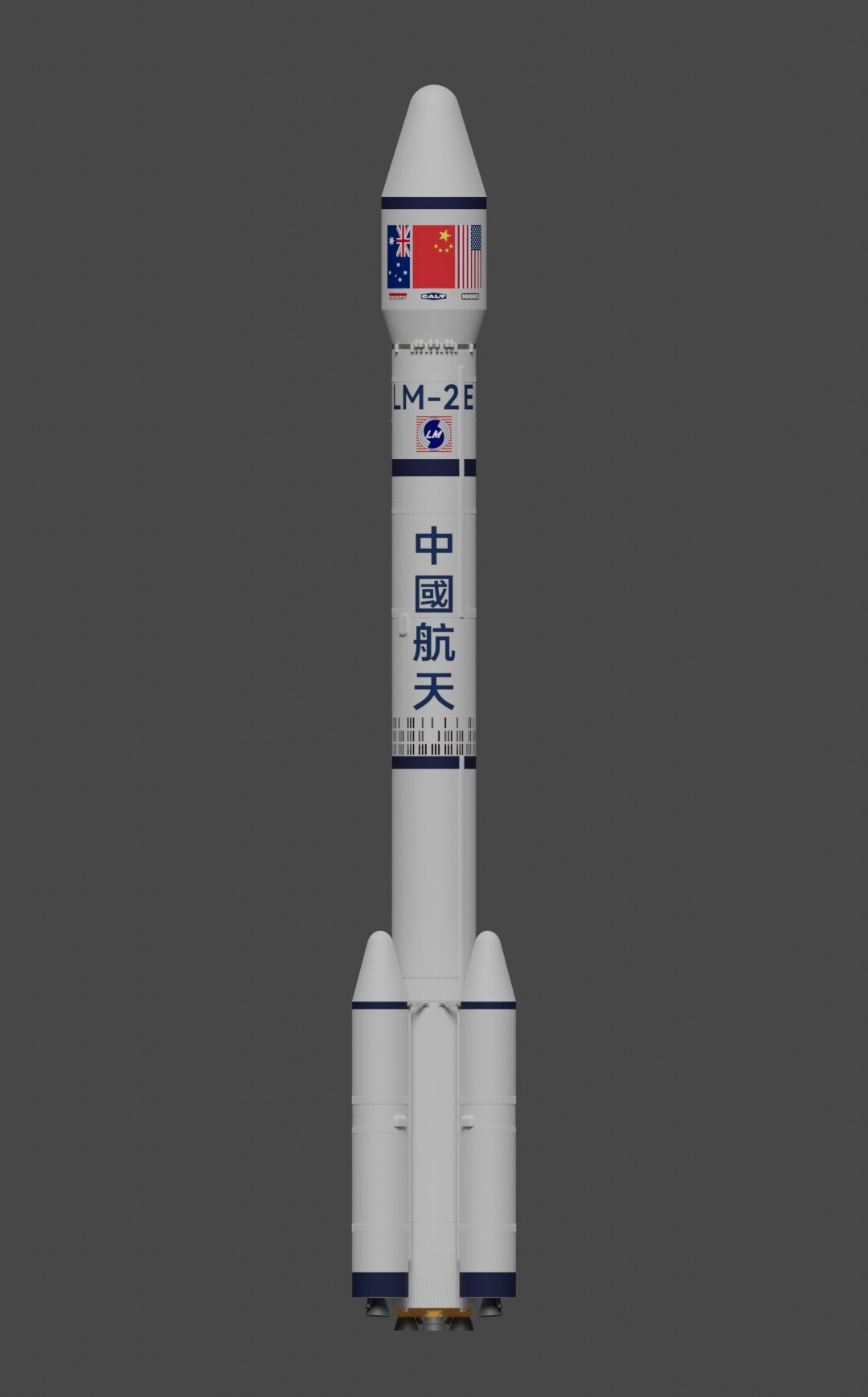
- Rendering of Long March 2E
- Function: Medium-lift launch vehicle
- Manufacturer: China Academy of Launch Vehicle Technology
- Country of origin: China

Size
- Height: 49.70 m (163.1 ft)
- Diameter: 3.35 m (11.0 ft)
- Mass: 460,000 kg (1,010,000 lb)
- Stages: 3

Capacity

Payload to LEO
- Mass: 9,500 kg (20,900 lb)

Payload to GTO
- Mass: 3,500 kg (7,700 lb)

Associated rockets
- Family: Long March
- Derivative work: Long March 2F

Launch history
- Status: Retired
- Launch sites: Xichang, LA-2
- Total launches: 7
- Success(es): 4
- Failure: 1
- Partial failure: 2
- First flight: 16 July 1990
- Last flight: 28 December 1995

Boosters
- No. boosters: 4
- Height: 15.33 m (50.3 ft)
- Diameter: 2.25 m (7 ft 5 in)
- Empty mass: 3,000 kg (6,600 lb)
- Gross mass: 40,754 kg (89,847 lb)
- Propellant mass: 37,754 kg (83,233 lb)
- Powered by: 1 × YF-20B
- Maximum thrust: 740.4 kN (166,400 lb_{f})
- Specific impulse: 260.66 s (2,556.2 m/s)
- Burn time: 127 seconds
- Propellant: N_{2}O_{4} / UDMH

First stage
- Height: 28.47 m (93.4 ft)
- Diameter: 3.35 m (11.0 ft)
- Empty mass: 12,550 kg (27,670 lb)
- Gross mass: 198,825 kg (438,334 lb)
- Propellant mass: 186,280 kg (410,680 lb)
- Powered by: 4 × YF-20B
- Maximum thrust: 2,961.6 kN (665,800 lb_{f})
- Specific impulse: 260.66 s (2,556.2 m/s)
- Burn time: 160 seconds
- Propellant: N_{2}O_{4} / UDMH

Second stage
- Height: 14.22 m (46.7 ft)
- Diameter: 3.35 m (11.0 ft)
- Empty mass: 4,955 kg (10,924 lb)
- Gross mass: 91,414 kg (201,533 lb)
- Propellant mass: 84,759 kg (186,862 lb)
- Powered by: 1 × YF-24B
- Maximum thrust: 926.8 kN (208,400 lb_{f})
- Specific impulse: 298.00 s (2,922.4 m/s)
- Burn time: 301 seconds
- Propellant: N_{2}O_{4} / UDMH

Third stage – EPKM (optional)
- Height: 2.936 m (9 ft 7.6 in)
- Diameter: 1.7 m (5 ft 7 in)
- Empty mass: 557 kg (1,228 lb)
- Gross mass: 6,001 kg (13,230 lb)
- Propellant mass: 5,444 kg (12,002 lb)
- Powered by: 1 × FG-46
- Maximum thrust: 190 kN (43,000 lb_{f})
- Specific impulse: 293 s (2,870 m/s)
- Burn time: 87 seconds
- Propellant: HTPB

The Long March 2E (LM-2E), also known as the Chang Zheng 2E (CZ-2E), was a Chinese medium-lift launch vehicle from the Long March 2 family. The Long March 2E was a three-stage carrier rocket that was designed to launch commercial communications satellites into geosynchronous transfer orbit. Launches took place from launch complex 2 at the Xichang Satellite Launch Center.

The Long March 2E made its maiden flight on 16 July 1990. However, the rocket had compatibility flaws with the American-made satellites that caused one launch failure and two partial failures across just seven missions. All of the failures were caused by excessive vibration. The rocket was retired on 28 December 1995 in favor of the Long March 3B. The Long March 2E forms the basis of the Long March 2F, used to launch the crewed Shenzhou spacecraft. The booster rockets developed for the Long March 2E have also been used on the Long March 3B and Long March 3C.

All of the satellites launched by the Long March 2E were made by companies based in the United States, which caused political controversy, over fears that the Chinese could study the satellites and use the information they learned to improve their designs. In response, in 1998, the U.S. Congress classified satellite technology as a munition and gave control over export licenses to the State Department under ITAR. No export licenses to China have been approved since 1998.

== Launches ==
The first partial failure occurred on 21 December 1992, during the launch of Optus B2. Wind shear caused the payload fairing to implode 45 seconds into flight, destroying the satellite. The rocket continued to orbit, deploying what was left of the upper stage and payload into a low Earth orbit. U.S. satellite manufacturer Hughes recommended reinforcement of the fairing. However, China chose not to follow the recommendation and instead added more rivets for the successful launch of Optus B3.

The second failure occurred on 25 January 1995 during the launch of Apstar 2, when the rocket exploded 50 seconds after liftoff. Based on readings from instrumentation that it added to the satellite, Hughes concluded that wind shear had again caused the collapse of a structurally deficient fairing. However, Liu Jiyuan, the Director of the China Aerospace Corporation, claimed that the rocket-satellite interface was at fault and threatened never to do business with Hughes again. The two sides finally agreed that the interface and the fairing would both be redesigned.

The return-to-flight payload, AsiaSat 2, had to pay a 27% premium for satellite insurance instead of the usual 17–20%. Although the satellite was delivered to the correct orbit, the launch was a partial failure. Excessive forces during the launch caused a misalignment of the antenna feed horns on the Ku-band transponders, reducing the satellite's coverage area. AsiaSat filed a satellite insurance claim for US$58 million.

After one more successful launch, the Long March 2E was retired at the end of 1995.

Flight	Launch (UTC)	Upper stage	Payload	Orbit	Result
1	16 July 1990, 00:40:00	SPTS-M14	Optus-B mass simulator	GTO	Success
1	16 July 1990, 00:40:00	SPTS-M14	Badr-1	LEO	Success
2	13 August 1992, 23:00:00	Star-63F	Optus-B1	GTO	Success (Note: Original launch attempt on 22 March 1992 at 10:40 UTC was aborted after engine ignition due to one booster engine igniter shutdown after metal contaminants caused electric arcing. Launch vehicle suffered damage and had to be replaced.)
3	21 December 1992, 11:21:00	Star-63F	Optus-B2	GTO	Partial failure
4	27 August 1994, 23:10:00	Star-63F	Optus-B3	GTO	Success
5	25 January 1995, 22:40:00	Star-63F	Apstar 2	GTO	Failure
6	28 November 1995, 11:30:00	EPKM	AsiaSat 2	GTO	Partial failure (Note: Excessive forces during the launch caused a misalignment of the antenna feed horns on the Ku-band transponders, reducing the satellite's coverage area.)
7	28 December 1995, 11:50:00	EPKM	EchoStar I	GTO	Success
