= FG-46 =

Chinese solid rocket motor

- Country of origin: China
- First flight: 1995-11-28
- Designer: China Hexi Chemical and Machinery Corporation
- Application: Kick engine
- Associated LV: Long March 2E
- Status: Out of production

Solid-fuel motor
- Propellant: AP / HTPB
- Casing: Fiberglass

Performance
- Thrust, vacuum: 190 kN (43,000 lbf)
- Specific impulse, vacuum: 293 s (2.87 km/s)
- Total impulse: 1.589 MN (357,000 lb_{f})
- Burn time: 87s

Dimensions
- Length: 2,936 mm (115.6 in)
- Diameter: 1,700 mm (67 in)
- Empty mass: 557 kg (1,228 lb)

Used in
- Long March 2E EPKM

The FG-46 (a.k.a. EPKM and SpaB-170) is a Chinese spin stabilized solid rocket motor burning HTPB-based composite propellant. It was developed by China Hexi Chemical and Machinery Corporation (also known as the 6th Academy of CASIC) for use in the Long March 2E on GTO missions. It first flew as a prototype SPTS-M14 on July 16, 1990, on the Badr A mission. It had its first commercial mission orbiting the AsiaSat 2 on November 28, 1995, and exactly one month later, on December 28 its second and last mission for EchoStar 1.

It has a total nominal mass of 6,001 kg (13,230 lb), of which 5,444 kg (12,002 lb) is propellant load and its burn out mass is 529 kg (1,166 lb). It has an average thrust of 190 kN (43,000 lbf) with a specific impulse of 292 seconds burning for 87 seconds, with a total impulse of 1.589 MN (357,000 lb_{f}). It is spin stabilized at 40 rpm and the propellant mass can be reduced by up to 350 kg (770 lb) eight months before launch or up to 15 kg (33 lb) on the launch site.
