= Thomas Moy =

English aircraft engineer (1823–1910)

- Born: Thomas William Moy; 1823; Liberty of the Rolls, London, England
- Died: 1910 (aged 86–87)
- Occupations: Civil and mechanical engineer and patent agent
- Known for: Aerial Steamer

Thomas William Moy (1823–1910) was an English engineer and patent agent best known for his Aerial Steamer of 1875.

== Early life ==
Moy was born in the Liberty of the Rolls (now part of Westminster) in London around 1823. In the 1851 census of Islington he is listed as living with his wife Henrietta and six-month-old daughter and is described as a 28-year-old law stationers clerk. In 1881 Moy was living in Camberwell and was described as a 58-year-old civil engineer. In 1901 he was still living in Camberwell but was now described as a 78-year-old mechanical engineer and patentee; his wife also with him, but she died a few months after the census.

== Aeronautics ==
Moy's introduction to aeronautics was through ballooning but he soon became interested in heavier-than-air flight, and performed some experiments with lifting surfaces by towing surfaces in the Surrey Canal in 1861.

Moy was one of the earliest members of the Aeronautical Society of Great Britain (later the Royal Aeronautical Society), founded in 1866, and presented a number of papers at its meetings, including one in 1869 describing the soaring flight of albatrosses in a wind.

His best-known work, the Aerial Steamer, was constructed in 1874 and tested at the Crystal Palace in South London in July 1875, with limited success: the aviation historian Charles Gibbs-Smith credits the machine with a brief flight, lifting off the ground by 6 in (15 cm). However, according to Octave Chanute's contemporary and detailed account, the aircraft never came close to flying because it was unable to reach the speed necessary for takeoff. The society described it as "one of the most determined attempts at solving the problem [of powered flight] which has yet taken place." Shortly after the first test, the machine was damaged in a storm. Moy rebuilt it with substantial modifications, but after brief tests, the project was abandoned owing to lack of money. He was also involved in a dispute over patent rights with Mr. Shill, the engineer who had worked with him on the development of the engine.

In 1879 he demonstrated the Military Kite to a meeting of the Aeronautical Society. This was a rubber-powered model, capable of taking off under its own power.

Around 1901 Moy was experimenting with an ornithopter mounted on an elevated track at Farnborough, Kent. In March 1904, Moy gave a lecture to the Aeronautical Society on mechanical flight. After his lecture the president announced:

We are now to have some photographs thrown on the screen descriptive of the gliding experiments of the brothers Wright ... Most of you know about the brothers Wright ... how they have been making some very good glides and how just lately they have applied a motor to their machine and made some very successful experiments in rising off the ground into the air

Moy died in 1910.

== The Aerial Steamer ==
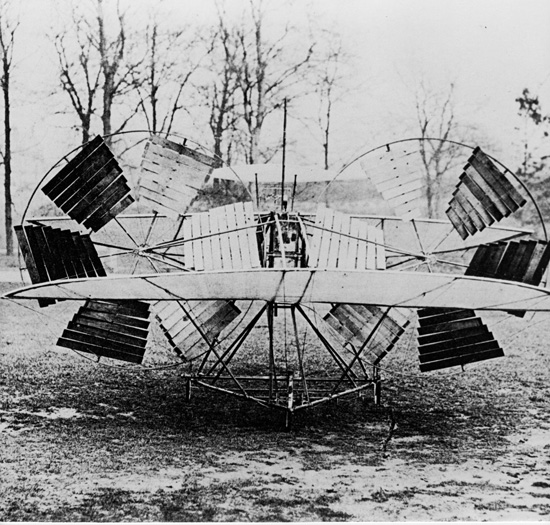
The Aerial Steamer, with the propellers as first designed

The Aerial Steamer, sometimes called the Moy-Shill Aerial Steamer, was an unmanned tandem wing aircraft driven by a 3 hp (2.24 kW) steam engine using methylated spirits as fuel. This drove a pair of six-bladed propellers placed between the two bamboo and stretched linen wings, of which the rear had a span of 14 ft (4.27 m) and an area of 64 ft^{2} (5.9 m^{2}). The front wing was slightly smaller, with an area of 50 ft^{2} (4.6 m^{2}). A third smaller surface was mounted at the rear of the aircraft; this was adjustable for the purpose of altering the trim. It was 14 ft (4.27 m) long and weighed about 216 lb (98 kg), of which the engine accounted for 80 lb (36 kg), and ran on three wheels. Moy's first set of propellers consisted of a number of individual wooden blades attached to the six spokes of the assembly, their pitch becoming finer the further they were from the hub. This propeller arrangement was replaced by stretched fabric blades before the flight test. The propellers were fitted with a mechanism designed to alter the pitch of the blades as they rotated, so that the blades moving downwards were at a coarser pitch to provide a lifting force.

It was tested in tether around an ornamental fountain at the Crystal Palace in South London in June 1875 on a circular rolled gravel track of nearly 300 ft (90 m) diameter. A first trial churned up the gravel and achieved very little. A wooden deck was then laid over the gravel, and a second attempt made. Moy later told Octave Chanute that it did not reach a speed of above 12 mph (19 km/h) and did not lift off; he had calculated that a speed of around 35 mph (56 km/h) would be necessary. However, it is credited with being the first steam-powered aircraft to have left the ground under its own power by the historian Charles Gibbs-Smith.

Shortly afterwards the Aerial Steamer was severely damaged in a gale. Moy rebuilt it, with the propellers enlarged to 12 ft (3.66 m) and now rotating about a vertical axis, in effect transforming the machine into a helicopter. In this configuration it now weighed 186 lb (84 kg). He tested it under cover, and it was found that by suspending it and counterbalancing 66 lb (30 kg) of its weight it would lift off, the "aerial wheels" (as Octave Chanute called them) providing 120 lb (54 kg) lift.

== The Military Kite ==
In 1879 Moy demonstrated his Military Kite to a meeting of the Royal Aeronautical Society. This was a small model aircraft propelled by a pair of rubber-driven propellers which rotated in opposite directions. This had two lifting surfaces like the Aerial Steamer, but was more like a modern aircraft in that there was a principal lifting surface mounted in front of a second lifting surface of half the span and a quarter of the area. The bow-shaped surfaces were made of cambric, had dihedral and an adjustable angle of incidence and were fixed to on a central pine box-girder, mounted on wheels. Unlike Alphonse Pénaud's Planophore of 1871, which had to be hand-launched, the Military Kite could take off under its own power.

== Sources ==
- Gibbs-Smith, C. H. (2003). Aviation. London: NMSI. ISBN 1 900747 52 9.
