= Shijian =

Series of Chinese satellites

Shijian Weixing
- 实践; Shíjiàn

Program overview
- Country: People's Republic of China
- Organization: China Academy of Space Technology (CAST); Shanghai Academy of Spaceflight Technology (SAST)
- Purpose: Unknown, varied
- Status: Active

Program history
- Duration: 1971–present
- First flight: 3 March 1971
- Last flight: 30 November 2025
- Successes: 44
- Failures: 5
- Launch sites: TSLC; JSLC; XSLC; WSLS

Vehicle information
- Launch vehicles: Feng Bao 1; Long March 1; Long March 2C; Long March 2D; Long March 3A; Long March 3B; Long March 4B; Long March 4C; Long March 5; Long March 7A

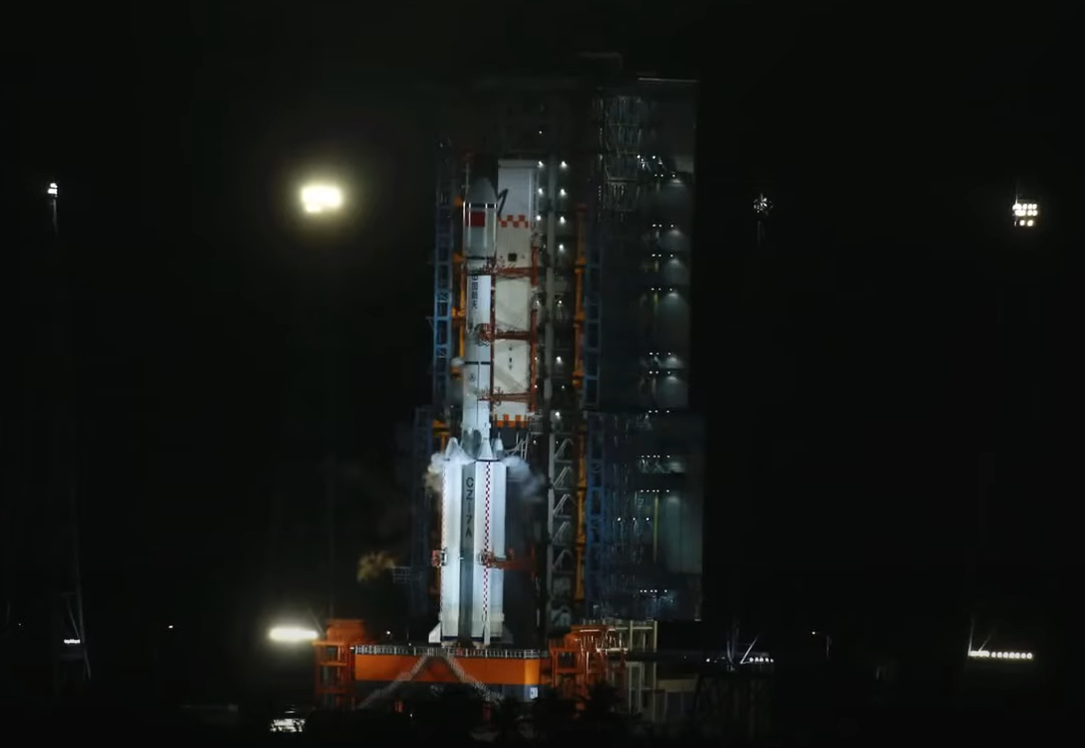
Shijian-23 prior to launch from Wenchang SLC

Shijian (simplified Chinese: 实践; traditional Chinese: 實踐; pinyin: Shíjiàn; lit. 'Practice', abbr. "SJ") is a series of satellites built and operated by the People's Republic of China. Some Shijian-series satellites have drawn significant concerns from the United States government and space observers who cite unannounced launches, undisclosed sub-satellites deployed in orbit, unusual orbital maneuvers, and demonstrated rendezvous proximity operations (RPO) including the close inspection and towing of other satellites.

Little is known about the series and what differentiates it from other experimental satellite series launched by China such as the Chuangxin (Chinese: 创新; pinyin: Chuàngxīn; lit. 'Innovation') series or Shiyan (Chinese: 实验; pinyin: Shíyàn; lit. 'Experiment') series. The China Aerospace Studies Institute of the United States Air Force asserts that Shiyan-series satellites play an earlier role in the systems development process testing various new technologies on a single bus while Shijian-series satellites are used to develop the best operational practices and optimize the technologies previously tested on Shiyan-series satellites. In this regard, "Shijian" should be translated as "best practice", or "put into practice" while "Shiyan" ought to be translated as "experiment", "pilot", or "trial".

== Notable satellites ==
=== Shijian-17 ===
Launched into geostationary orbit aboard a Long March 5 rocket on 3 November 2016 from Wenchang Space Launch Site, Shijian-17 is the first Chinese satellite to bear a robotic arm. Observers question the robotic arm's dual-purposes for space debris cleanup and kinetic attacks against adversary satellites.

In an April 2021 written statement to the US Senate Armed Services Committee, General James H. Dickinson, Commander of United States Space Command (USSPACECOM) was the first US official to speak publicly on Shijian-17 warning of its counterspace capabilities. General Dickinson wrote "Beijing actively seeks space superiority through space and space attack systems. One notable object is the Shijian-17, a Chinese satellite with a robotic arm. Space-based robotic arm technology could be used in a future system for grappling other satellites."

Shijian-17 has also prompted concern among observers who have tracked Shijian-17's unique orbital maneuvers. Since its launch, Shijian-17 has occupied a wide span of orbital positions within its geostationary orbit to dynamically adjust its position relative to neighboring satellites. These varied positions have ranged from 37.7°E over Africa to 180°E over the Marshall Islands, uncharacteristic of other satellites designed for communications. Shijian-17 has also positioned itself as close as 55 kilometers to other satellites for periods of a week or more while other geostationary satellites maintain an average 207-kilometer separation distance.

Shijian-17's robotic arm also earned mentions in the U.S. Office of the Secretary of Defense's congressionally-mandated Annual Report to Congress: Military and Security Developments involving the People's Republic of China. The 2022 report, the first to mention Shijian satellites by name, announced "The Shijian-17 is a Chinese satellite with a robotic arm. Space-based robotic arm technology could be used in a future system for grappling other satellites." The 2023 report specified "The Shijian-17 was the PRC's first satellite with a robotic arm, technology that could be used in a future system for grappling adversary satellites."

=== Shijian-18 ===
Shijian-18 was a Chinese communications and technology demonstration satellite developed and launched by the China Academy of Space Technology on 2 July 2017. It was the maiden flight of the DHF-5 satellite bus, which is designed with 16-year lifespan. Shijian-18 carried 18 experiments on board involving communications and space telescopes. It was lost after a malfunction on the Long March 5 rocket carrying the satellite. It would have been the heaviest geostationary satellite at the time of its launch, with a launch mass of 7,600 kg (16,800 lb). The satellite incorporated a high-thrust ion propulsion system, a large trussed structure and a higher payload capacity. More specifically, it used the LIPS-300 xenon thruster for orbit keeping, developed by the Lanzhou Institute of Physics. It was planned for the LIPS-300 system to be fully certified in this mission so that it could be used for geostationary and deep-space operations. The satellite would operate at the Ka band with 70 Gb/s capacity, capable of providing broadband internet to whole mainland China.

Shijian-18 launched from the Wenchang Space Launch Site on 2 July 2017 at 11:23 UTC on board a Long March 5 rocket to a geostationary orbit. It was the rocket's second flight, the first being to launch Shijian-17. The rocket encountered an anomaly shortly after launch, causing it to switch into a gentler trajectory. However, 45 minutes into the flight, it was declared a failure, with the loss of the payload. The cause of the failure was later determined to be a faulty oxidizer turbopump, which has now been redesigned twice. The rocket and payload crashed in the Pacific Ocean somewhere at the Philippine Sea.

=== Shijian-21 ===
In October 2021, China launched Shijian 21 (SJ-21) from Xichang Space Launch Center (XSLC) aboard a Long March 3B rocket into geosynchronous transfer orbit (GTO). Atypically, China issued no notifications prior to the launch confirming only after the satellite's successful launch. China's official state news media organization, Xinhua News Agency, described SJ-21 as an On-Orbit Service, Assembly, and Manufacturing (OSAM) satellite that would be "mainly used to test and verify space debris mitigation technologies."

A month after its launch, SJ-21 drew some suspicion from space observers as an object, described to be an undeclared sub-satellite, began orbiting closely alongside SJ-21 shortly after its entry into geosynchronous orbit (GEO). The object was initially cataloged as an apogee kick motor (AKM) by the US Space Force's 18th Space Defense Squadron (SDS), however many doubt that a discarded motor would maintain the constant and proximate orbit with SJ-21 instead of gradually drifting away. SJ-21 drew further suspicion in January 2022 when, according to commercial space monitoring firm ExoAnalytic Solutions, SJ-21 went "missing" from its orbital slot to dock with defunct Beidou G2 (Compass G2) navigation satellite capitalizing on the inability of optical satellites to track space-objects during the day. Shijian-21 then moved to an orbit 3,000 kilometers higher where it released the Beidou G2 satellite into graveyard orbit and returned to GEO.

Many observers suspect the spacecraft, like many of China's Yaogan and Gaofen satellites, serve primarily military purposes under the cover of more mundane missions. With SJ-21's demonstrate capability to tug satellites from their orbit and China's increasing interest in space power, the spacecraft likely also offers the Chinese government a tool for counterspace operations. Victoria Samson, the Washington Office director for the Secure World Foundation said "You could look at China working to develop the capability to remove inactive satellites on orbit as a way in which it is being a responsible space actor and cleaning up debris that it caused. Or you could use the lens that a lot of the US-based China watchers use and say that this could indicate that China is developing an on-orbit offensive capability." Samson also praised commercial space situational awareness (SSA) providers for presenting the public and academia with satellite tracking capabilities previously exclusive to government. China received criticism for its lack of transparency on Shijian-21's operations.

First mentioned by name in the 2022 China Military Power Report, the U.S. Office of the Secretary of Defense writes "China has launched multiple satellites to conduct scientific experiments on space maintenance technologies and is conducting research on space debris cleanup; the most recent launch was the Shijian-21 launched into GEO in October 2021. In January 2022, Shijian-21 moved a derelict BeiDou navigation satellite into a high graveyard orbit above GEO." The 2023 report restated the same.

The satellite was docked with Shijian-25 between July and November 2025, during which Shijian-25 allegedly refueled Shijian-21.

=== Shijian-25 ===
Shijian-25 (SJ-25) was launched on 5 January 2025 from Xichang Space Launch Center (XSLC) using a Long March 3B/E launch vehicle into a geosynchronous orbit. The satellite was designated “for the verification of satellite fuel replenishment and life extension service technologies” by its manufacturer, SAST, leading to the expectation that it was going to be used for in-orbit refueling operations. Shortly after its launch the satellite started approaching Shijian-21, which was used in 2022 to move a defunct satellite into a graveyard orbit. Shijian-21 had been initially observed drifting passively following the maneuver, suggesting it may have run out of fuel, but it started moving again in the months following the launch of Shijian-25 to park itself at 127.5 degrees East.

The close proximity operations between the two satellites culminated in late June or early July 2025, with the two satellites docking together and allegedly initiating refueling operations. The U.S. Space Force placed two of its GSSAP inspector satellites in a close position to the Chinese docked pair to monitor their operations. The two satellites remained docked until late November 2025, when they were observed separating. The separation could mark a successful conclusion to a world-first refueling operation in GEO. However, neither China's space authorities nor the satellites' manufacturer have commented on the mission since the launch. The pair remained in closed proximity following their separation, and a third object was detected by Space Force, likely released by one of the two spacecraft around 22 December 2025.

== Satellites ==
Name	Launch	Function	Orbit	Orbital apsis	Inclination	SCN	COSPAR ID	Launch site	Launcher	Status
Shijian 1	3 March 1971	Particle measurements of cosmic rays	LEO	266 km × 1826 km	69.9°	5007	1971-018A	JSLC	Long March 1	Decayed
Shijian 2	19 September 1981	Space dust/debris and EM study	LEO	232 km × 1598 km	59.4°	12845	1981-093D	JSLC	Feng Bao 1	Decayed
Shijian 2A	19 September 1981	Ionosphere research	LEO	232 km × 1615 km	59.4°	12843	1981-093B	JSLC	Feng Bao 1	Decayed
Shijian 2B	19 September 1981	Radar calibration	LEO	232 km × 1608 km	59.4º	12842	1981-093A	JSLC	Feng Bao 1	Decayed
Shijian 3	N/A	Earth observation	Cancelled, replaced by CBERS ZY-1							
Shijian 4	8 February 1994	Space radiation monitoring	HEO	210 km × 36125 km	28.6º	22996	1994-010A	XSLC	Long March 3A	Decayed
Shijian 5	10 May 1999	Test new minisatellite platform, particle measurement	SSO	569 km × 849 km	98.8°	25731	1999-025B	TSLC	Long March 4B	Decayed
Shijian 6-01B	8 September 2004	Space environment monitoring or ELINT	SSO	585.4 km × 585.2 km	97.7°	28414	2004-035B	TSLC	Long March 4B	Operational
Shijian 6-01A	8 September 2004	Space environment monitoring or ELINT	SSO	579.8 km × 596.7 km	97.7°	28413	2004-035A	TSLC	Long March 4B	Operational
Shijian 6-02A	23 October 2006	Space environment monitoring or ELINT	SSO	591.0 km × 593.4 km	97.8°	29506	2006-046B	TSLC	Long March 4B	Operational
Shijian 6-02B	23 October 2006	Space environment monitoring or ELINT	SSO	583.1 km × 587.7 km	97.8°	29505	2006-046A	TSLC	Long March 4B	Operational
Shijian 6-03A	25 October 2008	Space environment monitoring or ELINT	SSO	576.5 km × 599.1 km	97.8°	33409	2008-053B	TSLC	Long March 4B	Operational
Shijian 6-03B	25 October 2008	Space environment monitoring or ELINT	SSO	573.9 km × 600.1 km	97.9°	33408	2008-053A	TSLC	Long March 4B	Operational
Shijian 6-04A	6 October 2010	Space environment monitoring or ELINT	SSO	585.9 km × 600.1 km	97.8°	37180	2010-051B	TSLC	Long March 4B	Operational
Shijian 6-04B	6 October 2010	Space environment monitoring or ELINT	SSO	570.6 km × 606.8 km	97.8°	37179	2010-051A	TSLC	Long March 4B	Operational
Shijian 6-05A	10 December 2021	Space environment monitoring or ELINT	SSO	467.5 km × 475.4 km	97.3°	49961	2021-122A	JSLC	Long March 4B	Operational
Shijian 6-05B	10 December 2021	Space environment monitoring or ELINT	SSO	467.5 km × 475.4 km	93.9°	49962	2021-122B	JSLC	Long March 4B	Operational
Shijian 7	5 July 2005	Unknown	SSO	557.4 km × 605.5 km	97.7°	28737	2005-024A	JSLC	Long March 2D	Operational
Shijian 8	9 September 2006	Space agricultural experiments	LEO	177 km × 445 km	63.0°	29385	2006-035A	JSLC	Long March 2C	Decayed
Shijian 9A	14 October 2012	Optical imaging, environmental monitoring	SSO	622 km × 647 km	98.0°	38860	2012-056A	TSLC	Long March 2C	Operational
Shijian 9B	14 October 2012	Optical imaging, environmental monitoring, LWIR	SSO	623 km × 649 km	97.99°	38861	2012-056B	TSLC	Long March 2C	Operational
Shijian 10	5 April 2016	Retrievable microgravity experiments	LEO	234 km × 268 km	42.89°	41448	2016-023A	JSLC	Long March 2D	Decayed
Shijian 11-01	12 November 2009	Launch warning, IR tracking	SSO	689.7 km × 708.1 km	97.9°	36088	2009-061A	JSLC	Long March 2C	Operational
Shijian 11-02	29 July 2011	Launch warning, IR tracking	SSO	678.5 km × 701.3 km	98.4°	37765	2011-039A	JSLC	Long March 2C	Operational
Shijian 11-03	6 July 2011	Launch warning, IR tracking	SSO	689.8 km × 704.1 km	97.8°	37730	2011-030A	JSLC	Long March 2C	Operational
Shijian 11-04	18 August 2011	Launch warning, IR tracking	(Launch Failure)					JSLC	Long March 2C	Payload lost in rocket failure
Shijian 11-05	15 July 2013	Launch warning, IR tracking	SSO	689.4 km × 703.3 km	98.2°	39202	2013-035A	JSLC	Long March 2C	Operational
Shijian 11-06	31 March 2014	Launch warning, IR tracking	SSO	692.3 km × 713.6 km	98.1°	39624	2014-014A	JSLC	Long March 2C	Operational
Shijian 11-07	28 September 2014	Launch warning, IR tracking	SSO	690.6 km × 706.3 km	98.1°	40261	2014-059A	JSLC	Long March 2C	Operational
Shijian 11-08	27 October 2014	Launch warning, IR tracking	SSO	685.0 km × 701.7 km	98.2°	40286	2014-066A	JSLC	Long March 2C	Operational
Shijian 12	15 June 2010	Scientific research	SSO	575 km × 599 km	97.68°	36596	2010-027A	JSLC	Long March 2D	Operational
Shijian 13	12 April 2017	High-throughput communications	GEO	35,765.3 km × 35,823.8 km	0.1°	42662	2017-018A	XSLC	Long March 3B	Operational
Shijian 15	19 July 2013	Unknown payload deployment	SSO	670.6 km × 678.4 km	98.0°	39210	2013-037C	TSLC	Long March 4C	Operational
Shijian 16-01	25 October 2013	Space environment monitoring or SIGINT	LEO	599 km × 616 km	74.98°	39358	2013-057A	JSLC	Long March 4B	Operational
Shijian 16-02	29 June 2016	Space environment monitoring or SIGINT	LEO	596 km × 616 km	75.00°	41634	2016-043A	JSLC	Long March 4B	Operational
Shijian 17	3 November 2016	Communications and debris inspection or counterspace	GEO	35,827.1 km × 35,835.4 km	2.2°	41838	2016-065A	WSLC	Long March 5	Operational
Shijian 18	2 July 2017	Test of new DFH-5 platform, telecom	(Launch Failure)					WSLC	Long March 5	Payload lost in rocket failure
Shijian 19	27 September 2024	Test of next-generation reusable technology, returnable microgravity experiments	LEO	322 km × 339 km	41.6°		2024-177A	JSLC	Long March 2D	Operational
Shijian 20	27 December 2019	Test of new DFH-5 platform, experimental quantum telecom	GEO	35,774.9 km × 35,814.1 km	1.347°	44910	2019-097A	WSLC	Long March 5	Operational
Shijian 21	24 October 2021	Debris clean-up or counterspace	GEO	36,217.7 km × 36,217.7 km	8.580°	49330	2021-094A	XSLC	Long March 3B	Operational
Shijian 21 (subsat)	24 October 2021	Unknown				49382	2021-094C	XSLC	Long March 3B	Operational
Shijian 22	TBA	Classified	GEO	Planned: not yet launched						Planned
Shijian 23	8 January 2023	Classified	GEO	35,769.1 km × 35,816.8 km	0.6°	55131	2023-002A	WSLC	Long March 7A	Operational
Shijian 23 (subsat)	8 January 2023	Unknown				55180	2023-002C	WSLC	Long March 7A	Operational
Shijian 25	6 January 2025	On orbit refueling and satellite life extension services	GEO					XSLC	Long March 3B	Operational
Shijian 26	29 May 2025	Earth observation and environmental management	SSO					JSLC	Long March 4B	Operational
Shijian 28	30 November 2025		GTO					WSLS LC-2	Long March 7A	Operational
Shijian 29A	30 December 2025		GEO					WSLS LC-2	Long March 7A	Operational
Shijian-29B	30 December 2025		GEO					WSLS LC-2	Long March 7A	Operational
Shijian 30A	19 November 2025		SSO					JSLC SLS-2	Long March 2C	Operational
Shijian-30B	19 November 2025		SSO					JSLC SLS-2	Long March 2C	Operational
Shijian-30C	19 November 2025		SSO					JSLC SLS-2	Long March 2C	Operational
Shijian 31	16 June 2026		GEO					XSLC LC-2	Long March 3B	Operational
Shijian 32	16 January 2026		GEO					XSLC LC-2	Long March 3B	Launch Failure
Sources: NORAD, NASA, USSPACECOM, Celestrak, Gunter's Space Page

== See also ==
- Yaogan
- Gaofen
- Fengyun
