= International Traffic in Arms Regulations =

United States law preventing export of military technologies

International Traffic in Arms Regulations (ITAR) is a set of U.S. Department of State regulations that control the export of defense and military technologies to safeguard national security and further its foreign policy objectives.

== Overview ==
The United States government has adopted two types of regulations to control exports of military-relevant items: ITAR, which cover weapons and defense articles specifically (such as missiles); and the Export Administration Regulations, which cover items that may have uses in defense articles (such as a radar component used in a certain missile).

Defense-related articles and services on the United States Munitions List (USML) are covered by the ITAR, which implement the provisions of the Arms Export Control Act (AECA), and are described in Title 22 (Foreign Relations), Chapter I (Department of State), Subchapter M of the Code of Federal Regulations. The Department of State Directorate of Defense Trade Controls (DDTC) interprets and enforces ITAR. The related Export Administration Regulations (Code of Federal Regulations Title 15 chapter VII, subchapter C) are enforced and interpreted by the Bureau of Industry and Security in the Commerce Department. The Department of Defense is also involved in the review and approval process. Physical enforcement of the ITAR (as well as all import and export laws of the United States) is performed by Homeland Security Investigations Special Agents (formerly U.S. Customs) under Immigration and Customs Enforcement, an agency of the Department of Homeland Security.

For practical purposes, ITAR regulations dictate that information and material pertaining to defense and military-related technologies (items listed on the U.S. Munitions List) may only be shared with US persons unless authorization from the Department of State is received to export the material or information to a foreign person. US persons (including organizations; see legal personality) can face heavy fines if they have, without authorization or the use of an exemption, provided foreign persons with access to ITAR-protected defense articles, services or technical data.

The U.S. Munitions List changes over time. Until 1996–1997, ITAR classified strong cryptography as arms and prohibited their export from the U.S. Another change occurred as a result of Space Systems/Loral's conduct after the February 1996 failed launch of the Intelsat 708 satellite. The Department of State charged Space Systems/Loral with violating the Arms Export Control Act and the ITAR.

ITAR does not apply to information related to general scientific, mathematical or engineering principles that are commonly taught in schools and colleges or information that is in the public domain. Nor does it apply to general marketing information or basic system descriptions. Broad interpretations of these exceptions have faced several legal challenges. For example, college professors have been prosecuted for breaches of the AECA as a result of access to USML items by foreign graduate students and companies have been penalized for alleged breaches of the AECA for failing to properly remove USML items from material used to market defense articles. The U.S. government has also taken action (albeit unsuccessfully) for the export of technical data that was allegedly already publicly available on the Internet.

== History ==
The AECA and ITAR were enacted in 1976 during the Cold War with the USSR and were intended to implement unilateral arms export controls that reflected those imposed on Eastern Bloc countries by the multilateral Coordinating Committee for Multilateral Export Controls.

U.S. Government enforcement activities have increased dramatically since 1999, when the U.S. Department of State took over export regulations for satellites. The U.S. Department of State has published 29 instances of Consent Agreements (agreements entered into by parties charged with breaches of ITAR) since 1999. This compares to 12 Consent Agreements in the preceding 22 years. ITAR's prominence has also increased as its implications for foreign parties that handle USML items have become better understood (see "Controversy" below).

ITAR's impact of increased regulations also meant America's worldwide market share in satellite technology declined from 83 percent to 50 percent in 2008, states The Economist, which cited a report from Space Review. In early 2013 legislation was passed allowing the removal of satellite technology from ITAR regulation.

== Operation ==
=== Classification of defense articles ===
The ITAR regulate defense articles and defense services.

Defense articles can be broken down into two categories: (a) physical items (often referred to as "commodities") and (b) technical data. The ITAR contain a list of defense articles called the US Munitions List ("USML"), which can be found at 22 CFR §121.1. The USML is broken down into the following categories:

1. Firearms, close assault weapons and combat shotguns
2. Guns and armament
3. Ammunition/ordnance
4. Launch vehicles, Guided missiles, ballistic missiles, rockets, torpedoes, bombs and mines
5. Explosives and energetic materials, propellants, incendiary agents and their constituents
6. Surface vessels of war and special naval equipment
7. Tanks and military vehicles
8. Aircraft and associated equipment
9. Military training equipment
10. Personal Protective Equipment
11. Military electronics
12. Fire control, range finders, optical and guidance and control equipment
13. Materials and miscellaneous equipment
14. Toxicological agents, including chemical agents, biological agents, and associated equipment
15. Spacecraft and associated equipment
16. Nuclear weapons related articles
17. Classified articles, technical data and defense services not otherwise enumerated
18. Directed energy weapons
19. Gas turbine engines and associated equipment
20. Submersible vessels, oceanographic and related articles
21. Articles, technical data, and defense services not otherwise enumerated

For example, an M4 carbine, which is an assault rifle used by the U.S. military, would be identified under Category I paragraph (b):

*(b) Fully automatic firearms to .50 caliber inclusive (12.7 mm).

A flash suppressor for the M4 rifle then follows in paragraph (e):

*(e) Silencers, mufflers, sound and flash suppressors for the articles in (a) through (d) of this category and their specifically designed, modified or adapted components and parts.

Components, parts, and accessories for the M4 are in paragraph (h):

(h) Components, parts, accessories and attachments for the articles in paragraphs (a) through (g) of this category.

Finally, technical data and defense services relating to the M4 are in paragraph (i):

(i) Technical data (as defined in §120.33 of this subchapter) and defense services (as defined in §120.32 of this subchapter) directly related to the defense articles described in paragraphs (a) through (h) of this category. Technical data directly related to the manufacture or production of any defense articles described elsewhere in this category that are designated as Significant Military Equipment (SME) shall itself be designated SME.

Technical data is defined in the ITAR at 22 CFR §120.33 as:

(1) Information, other than software as defined in 22 CFR §120.40(g), which is required for the design, development, production, manufacture, assembly, operation, repair, testing, maintenance or modification of defense articles. This includes information in the form of blueprints, drawings, photographs, plans, instructions or documentation.

(2) Classified information relating to defense articles and defense services on the U.S. Munitions List and 600-series items controlled by the Commerce Control List;

(3) Information covered by an invention secrecy order; or

(4) Software (see 22 CFR §120.40(g)) directly related to defense articles.

=== Registration ===
All U.S. manufacturers, exporters, and brokers of defense articles, defense services, or related technical data, as defined on the USML, are required to register with U.S. Department of State. Registration is primarily a means to provide the U.S. Government with necessary information on who is involved in certain manufacturing and exporting activities. Registration does not confer any export rights or privileges, but is a precondition for the issuance of any license or other approval for export. Registration fees start at US$2,250 per year.

=== Exporting defense articles ===
Under ITAR, a "US person" who wants to export USML items to a "foreign person" must obtain authorization from the U.S. Department of State before the export can take place.

A "U.S. person" can be

- a U.S. citizen;
- a permanent resident who does not work for a foreign company, a foreign government, or a foreign governmental agency/organization;
- a political asylee;
- a part of the U.S. government, or
- a corporation, business, organization, or group that is incorporated in the United States under U.S. law.

A foreign person is any person who is not a lawful permanent resident of the U.S. and includes foreign governments and organizations. This means that, for example, a foreign person who is visiting the U.S. will remain a foreign person for the purposes of ITAR and any export of USML items to them inside the U.S. must be subject to an export authorization. This is similar to the concept of "Deemed Exports" used by the Bureau of Industry and Security within the United States Department of Commerce in administration of the Export Administration Regulations although the Department of State does not use the term "Deemed Export" (see also "Restrictions on Dual and Third Country Nationals below").

The export authorization may take the form of:

- a Foreign Military Sales ("FMS") Case whereby the U.S. Government sells the USML items directly to a foreign government;
- an export license, such as a DSP-5 (Department of State Publication No. 5), which authorizes the temporary or permanent export of defense articles and/or technical data to a foreign person (but not technical assistance or defense services);
- a Warehouse and Distribution Agreement which is an agreement to establish a warehouse or distribution point abroad for defense articles to be exported from the United States for subsequent distribution to entities in an approved sales territory;
- a Technical Assistance Agreement ("TAA") which authorizes a U.S. manufacturer/service provider to supply defense services to a foreign person (which could involve training or technical discussions regarding U.S. technology); or
- a Manufacturing License Agreement ("MLA") which authorises a U.S. manufacturer to supply manufacturing know-how related to defense articles to a foreign person.

Where the export authorization relates to USML items that are classified information or are identified as "Significant Military Equipment" on the USML, a DSP-83 Nontransfer and Use Certificate will also be required.

Collaborative programs (also known as "Armaments Cooperative Projects" ("ACPs")) between the U.S. and foreign Governments (such as the Joint Strike Fighter) may also authorize export of USML items (subject to strict controls).

== Restrictions on retransfer ==
ITAR also operates to prohibit the "retransfer" (also called "re-export") of items on the USML by foreign persons unless the retransfer is specifically authorized under the relevant export authorization.

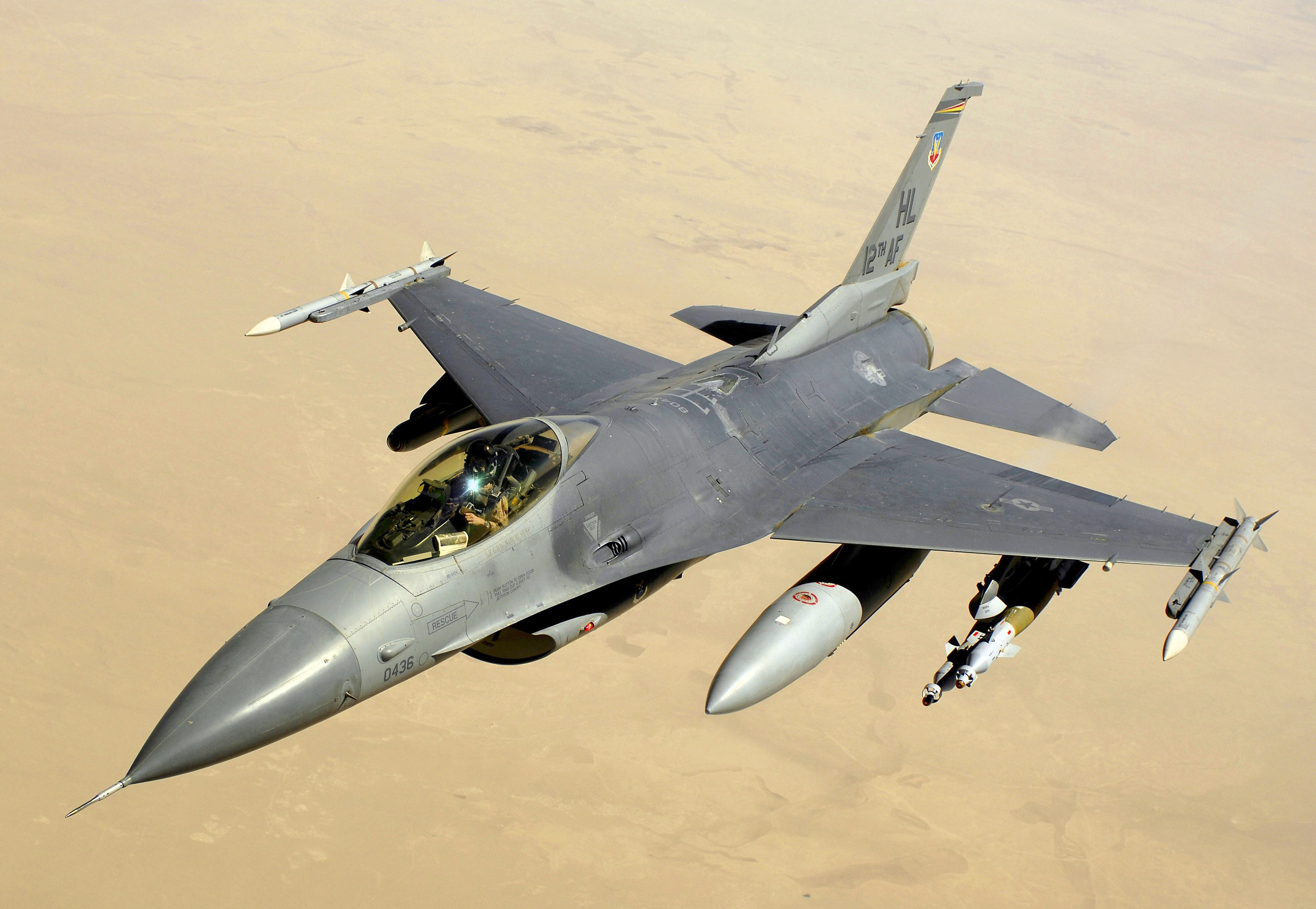
ITAR's restrictions on retransfer blocked Venezuela's threatened sale of used F-16 aircraft to Iran in 2006.

The prohibition on retransfer stems from the requirement for all export authorizations to include the statement that "[t]he technical data or defense service exported from the United States in furtherance of this agreement and any defense article which may be produced or manufactured from such technical data or defense service may not be transferred to a person in a third country or to a national of a third country except as specifically authorized in this agreement unless the prior written approval of the Department of State has been obtained."

This means that if, for example, a foreign person wants to retransfer a USML item to another foreign person (such as a subcontractor), both foreign persons must be authorized under the relevant export authorization:

- where the export authorization is a FMS case, the foreign government must have "third party transfer approval" from the U.S. Government;
- if the export authorization is an export license such as a DSP-5, all foreign parties must be named on the license (for example, some may be "intermediate consignees"); and
- where the export authorization is a TAA or MLA, all foreign recipients must be named as parties to (or as "authorized sublicensees" under) the agreement.

Where a foreign person requires access to USML items exported under a specific export authorization, but that foreign person is not authorized under the export authorization, the export authorization must be amended and re-approved by the U.S. Department of State. This can be a time-consuming process.

== Restrictions on retransfer to dual nationals and third country nationals ==
ITAR treats access to USML items by "dual-national" and "third country national" employees of a foreign organization as a retransfer to the employees' other countries of nationality. As a result, access to USML items by such employees must be specifically authorized under the relevant export authorization. If access to USML items by dual and third country national employees of a foreign organization is authorized, it only authorizes transfer to the employee. It does not authorize export to the employee's country of dual or third nationality.

If a U.S. export authorization is silent as to access by dual and third country national employees of a foreign party, the authorization has the effect of limiting access to employees who are nationals only of the country of their employer. This means that, for example, a TAA that includes a British company as the foreign person, but which does not include clauses authorizing access by dual and third country nationals will limit access to USML items supplied under the TAA to employees of the British company who are British citizens only.

This can cause significant problems for foreign governments and organizations from countries with large first generation immigrant populations (which is discussed in more detail under "Controversy"). As a result, the U.S. Government and the Australian Government have drawn attention to the importance for U.S. companies to consult closely with foreign persons who will be subject to a U.S. export authorization before it is submitted to the U.S. Department of State for approval.

Clauses approved by the U.S. Department of State must be included in TAAs and MLAs in order to authorize access to USML items by dual and third country national employees of foreign parties to the export authorization. These clauses will generally permit access by dual and third country nationals from NATO, EU, Japan, Switzerland, New Zealand and Australia (subject to certain conditions). Employees of foreign persons holding dual or third country nationality from countries proscribed under ITAR 126.1, such as Vietnam, The People's Republic of China ("PRC"), North Korea, Syria, and Iran, will, as a general rule, not be authorized to have access to USML items. It is less-clear how dual and third country nationals are addressed in FMS cases and export licenses such as DSP-5s.

== Enforcement ==
The U.S. Government has substantially increased action against organizations and individuals responsible for breaches of ITAR since 1999. The most notable enforcement action was the $100M penalty applied to ITT as a result of the unauthorized retransfer of night vision technology to the PRC in 2007. Other major U.S. defense contractors penalized for alleged breaches of ITAR in recent years include (among others) Lockheed Martin, Motorola, Boeing, L-3 Communications, and Northrop Grumman.

In most cases, penalties against corporate entities involve a mandatory compliance component requiring the entity to spend funds on compliance measures, including the appointment of "Internal Special Compliance Officers". Penalties may also require the party to submit to external audit. In serious cases, a party may be debarred from future exporting for a period of time.

U.S. Government policy also imposes a positive obligation on U.S. companies to fully disclose any breaches of ITAR to the U.S. Government. Failure to do so can significantly increase penalties applied by the U.S. Government.

The U.S. Government:

- will also penalize U.S. companies for breaches of ITAR caused by their overseas subsidiaries;
- is critical of companies that have not implemented effective export compliance programs; and
- treats breaches of ITAR as a strict liability offence and will penalize a successor or purchaser of a company that has breached ITAR as though it was responsible for the breaches.

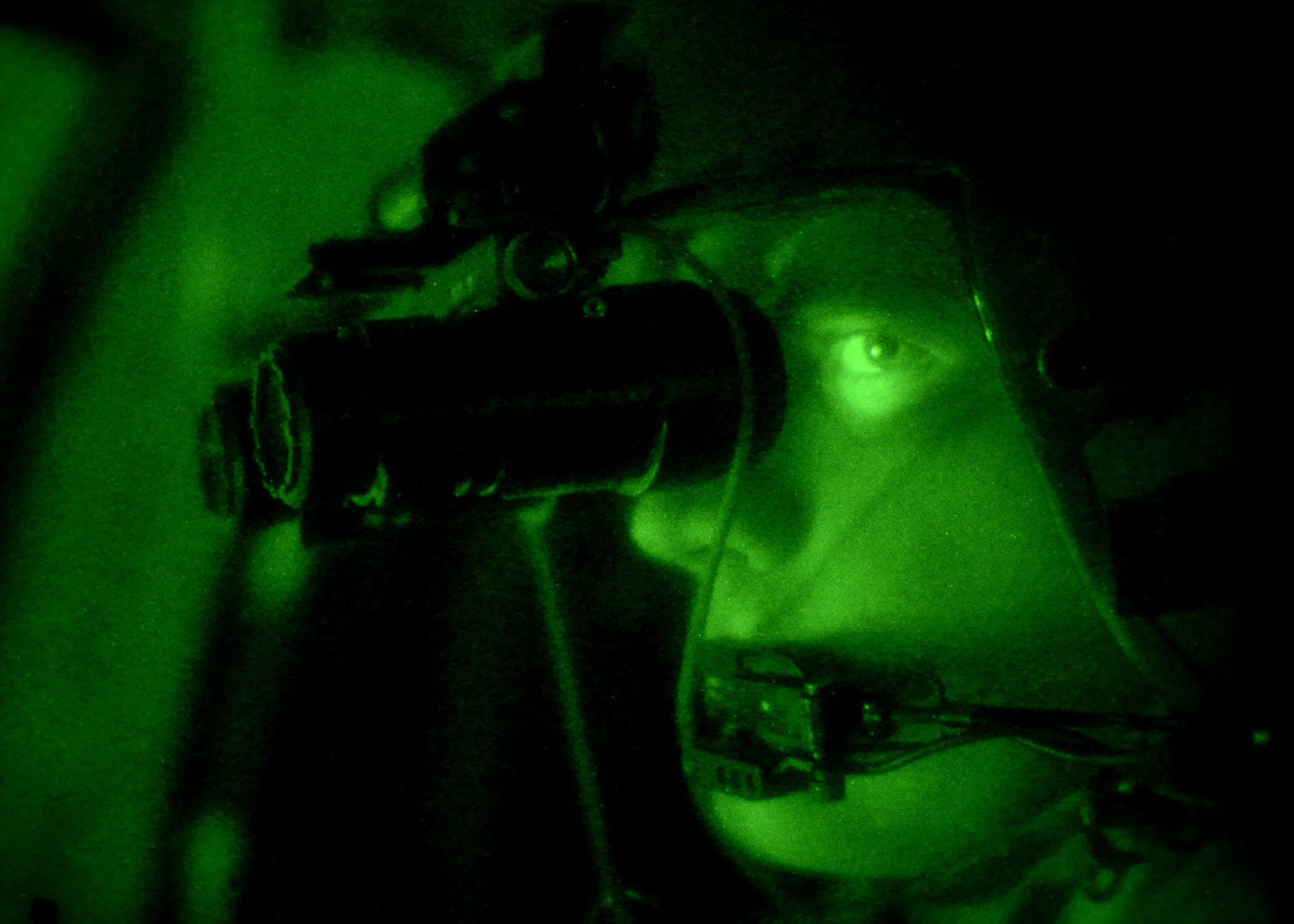
The unauthorized export of night vision technology has been the subject of several enforcement actions by the U.S. Government.

The U.S. Government will also take action against individuals responsible for breaches of ITAR and such action can involve criminal penalties. Actions are often initiated by U.S. Immigrations and Customs Enforcement and include:

- the prosecution of Dr J Reece Roth of the University of Tennessee in 2008 for breaches of ITAR as a result of access to USML items by a PRC graduate student;
- the prosecution of Yen Ching Peng, a Taiwanese national, in the U.S. in 2008 for breaches of ITAR as a result of attempts to export night vision technology and laser sights without the appropriate export authorizations;
- the indictment of three men — two U.S. nationals and a Vietnamese national — in 2008 on charges of illegally exporting night vision technology to Vietnam; and
- the prosecution of Chi Mak in 2007 as a result of (among other things) the attempted export of USML items to the PRC (Chi Mak was subsequently sentenced to 24½ years in federal prison).

Since 1990, the U.S. Government has also operated the "Blue Lantern" end-use monitoring program. Blue Lantern "monitors the end-use of commercially exported defense articles, defense services, and related technical data subject to licensing or other authorizations under section 38 of the AECA." Blue Lantern checks are conducted following a careful selection process to identify transactions that appear most at risk for diversion or misuse. Unfavorable Blue Lanterns are reviewed by DTCC's Enforcement Division. Where appropriate, parties involved in unfavorable Blue Lantern cases may be subject to civil enforcement actions or referred to law enforcement for criminal investigation.

== Compliance ==
Because failure to implement an effective export compliance program can be an exacerbating factor in the event of a breach of ITAR, the U.S. Government encourages U.S. exporters to implement internal export compliance programs. The U.S. Government may also require U.S. exporters that are party to an export authorization to develop a technology transfer control plan specific to that export authorization.

Other countries also encourage their nationals who are using USML items to implement internal export compliance programs to address ITAR requirements. It is notable that the failure of overseas companies to implement ITAR compliance programs has been criticized by the U.S. Department of State.

Companies in U.S. and overseas are increasingly using ERP software to track ITAR controlled items through the supply chain.

== ITAR reform ==
While political debate over the wisdom of placing all satellite and launch technology on the US Munitions List (USML) has been ongoing since the advent of ITAR regulation in 1999, there has been a shift in political opinion since 2007. In late 2012, the US Congress passed the 2013 defense authorization bill which, if signed into law, will allow U.S. satellite manufacturers to "be more able to collaborate with international partners and [place] U.S. component makers on a more even footing in the global marketplace." The bill "allows the president to remove commercial satellites and components from the U.S. Munitions List (USML) and allows him to decide which satellite technologies are the most important to protect. The bill still restricts the export and transfer of technology to China, Cuba, Iran, North Korea, Sudan, and Syria."

The political changes in 2012 came after several years of a gradual shift in thinking. In 2010, the Congress formally requested "an assessment of the national security risks of removing satellites and components from the USML. The study, known as the 1248 report, was completed in April 2012.

While satellite technology had been subjected to ITAR since 1999, the U.S. had seen its share of global satellite manufacturing halved with, according to the Aerospace Industries Association, an estimated loss of $21 billion in revenue from 1999 to 2009.

As part of the 2024 National Defense Authorization Act (NDAA), the U.S. Congress included a partial exemption from ITAR for the U.K. and Australia as long as their export controls laws were comparable to the U.S's. On August 15, 2024, the State Department determined that export control regimes of Australia and the U.K. were comparable to the U.S's which will allow for license-free trade for more than 70% of items covered by ITAR between the three AUKUS countries from September 1, 2024.

== Controversy ==
=== Harm to U.S. commercial and academic interests ===
There is an open debate between the Department of State and the industries and academia regulated by ITAR concerning how harmful the regulatory restrictions are for U.S.-domiciled businesses and higher education institutions.

==== Academic work and the "Fundamental Research Exemption" ====
Higher education institutions argue that ITAR prevents the best international students from studying and contributing in the United States, and prevents cooperation on certain types of international scientific projects. ITAR generally prohibits foreign persons from collaborating with US citizens on projects pertaining to items on the USML without export licensing, as such work can be construed to fall under one of the several enumerated definitions of "export," such as:

- "Disclosing (including oral or visual disclosure) or transferring technical data to a foreign person"
- "Performing a defense service on behalf of, or for the benefit of, a foreign person, whether in the United States or abroad"

Where the definition of "defense service" includes "the furnishing of assistance (including training) to foreign persons, whether in the United States or abroad in the design, development, engineering, manufacture, production, assembly, testing, repair, maintenance, modification, operation, demilitarization, destruction, processing or use of defense articles."

The ITAR specifies that the products of "fundamental research" are not considered controlled "technical data," so long as they are published freely. Fundamental research is defined as university-based "basic and applied research in science and engineering where the resulting information is ordinarily published and shared broadly within the scientific community, as distinguished from research the results of which are restricted for proprietary reasons or specific U.S. Government access and dissemination controls."

Research that does not meet the criteria of "fundamental research" cannot involve foreign persons without export licenses; however, research activities that are considered fundamental typically can involve foreign persons, even when they involve the design and construction of defense articles, as the US State Department has deemed such research activities to fall outside of the purview of training activities that would constitute the illegal export of a "defense service." The need to make this distinction has led many U.S. research universities to adopt ITAR policies and compliance programs. These measures can vary widely; for example, MIT states that "the intent of the ITAR is that research conducted on campus, without restrictions on publication or participation, is fundamental research from inception to publication as long as the intent is to publish the results," while Stanford University maintains a more nuanced and restrictive approach to research involving defense articles.

University interpretation and up-to-date understanding of export control regulations and willingness to seek opinions from the U.S. State Department affect the research that can be conducted on their campuses; for example, the University of Michigan successfully obtained an opinion from the Department of State stating that satellite development work on an (at the time) ITAR-controlled satellite being conducted by a student group containing both U.S. and non-U.S. citizens was considered fundamental research and was allowed to proceed. In contrast, as of March 2016, Stanford's Export Control Officer maintains that all satellite systems are controlled defense articles under the ITAR (despite their reclassification under the EAR in 2014) and, based on NASA criteria for automatic designation of a research project as fundamental research, does not consider projects above TRL 4 to be fundamental research, limiting the activities of laboratories and project-based groups on campus. This and similar policies are particularly damaging to international students studying aerospace engineering or related fields at U.S. universities, as opportunities to gain practical experience in their studies through internships are, due to licensing requirements, typically not offered to them at U.S. aerospace companies, and on-campus projects, when allowed, offer an alternate route for developing skills like those obtained through internships and co-op programs.

==== Effects on the U.S. space industry ====
The Department of State insists that ITAR has limited effect and provides a security benefit to the nation that outweighs any impact that these sectors must bear. Every year, the Department of State can cite multiple arrests of ITAR violators by U.S. Immigration and Customs Enforcement agents and the FBI. It is apparent that companies and institutions within the affected areas are somewhat stifled by ITAR regulations, in addition to the trade the U.S. economy would receive, and the science technology that it would share, notwithstanding that its restrictions encourage U.S. allies (such as Australia and the UK) to procure defense equipment from other sources that may not be interoperable with U.S. equipment. Companies argue that ITAR is a significant trade barrier that acts as a substantial negative subsidy, weakening U.S. industries' ability to compete. U.S. companies point to announcements in Europe by TAS (Thales Alenia Space) promoting their "ITAR-free" telecommunication satellites. In 2008, officials at the Department of State dismissed the burden on industry and educational institutions as minor compared to the contributions to national security provided by ITAR. They also view the announcements of "ITAR-free" items as anecdotal and not systemic.

There is evidence that ITAR considerations have been a factor in decisions by foreign governments to avoid U.S. products and decisions by U.S. companies to remove USML items from their products:

- In April 2006, the Australian Government was reported to have chosen EADS MRH-90 troop-lift helicopters in preference to U.S. Sikorsky models because "the European bid offered the ADF better access to crucial computer source code than the Sikorsky bid".
- ITAR controls, as well as separate policy concerns, have hampered international cooperation in development of the F-35 Lightning II multirole fighter aircraft. Both the British and the Australian governments demanded a guarantee that the U.S. will fully disclose technology needed for the JSF project before they would commit to further involvement in the project.
- Concerns over connections between the Boeing 787 and the B-2 Spirit stealth bomber prompted Boeing to take elaborate steps cleansing the commercial jet of any military technology. The issue arose when Boeing engineers, fearing indictment and penalties, refused to sign forms declaring that the 787 was "ITAR-free." As a result, Boeing conducted extensive research on the source of technology implemented on the 787. They removed all military technology and either found a commercial source for the same technology or replaced it with technology derived from non-military sources.
- For the F-X2 program, the Brazilian government considered the French Dassault Rafale over the Boeing F/A-18E/F Super Hornet due to concerns over technology transfer barriers and ITAR regulations, regardless that the Brazilian Air Force and the majority of their pilots preferred the Super Hornet over other bidders. Nelson Jobim, Defense minister of Brazil, said: "the U.S. government could give no upfront guarantee and Brazil had seen a series of U.S. technology embargoes." The lucrative contract was for 36 aircraft and will be extended to over 100 units in the next decade. In December 2013, it was announced that the Swedish Saab JAS 39 Gripen was selected, in a deal worth about $4.5 billion; Saab guaranteed the transfer of “all systems” as part of the deal, including software to ensure the Brazilian Air Force had the capability to customize the technology — and air force general Juniti Saito stated “the intellectual property of this new fighter will be ours”.

=== Registration fees ===
The U.S. Department of State charges back fees to manufacturers who have failed to register previously. Smaller exporters who may not have been aware of the requirement to register can potentially be charged crippling back fees when they first register. Allegations have been put to the U.S. Department of State-industry advisory group, the Defense Trade Advisory Group, that charging back fees discourages some manufacturers from registration.

=== Restrictions on foreign products ===
Restrictions on retransfer of USML items can also cause difficulties where those items have been incorporated into a product manufactured by a foreign person. If the foreign person wants to retransfer the product to another foreign person, it must obtain authorization from the U.S. Government before the retransfer can take place.

It is open to the U.S. Government to refuse to authorize retransfer of a foreign product that includes USML items:

- in 2006, the U.S. Government refused to authorize the sale of C-295 transport and maritime patrol aircraft manufactured by the Spanish aircraft manufacturer, EADS-CASA, to Venezuela because the aircraft included US-origin avionics and engine components controlled under the USML. As a consequence, EADS-CASA was forced to cancel a €500 million contract with Venezuela; and
- in 2006, Embraer of Brazil was also prevented from selling Super Tucano aircraft to Venezuela by the U.S.

As a consequence of the blocking of these sales, Venezuela has subsequently purchased aircraft and other military hardware from Russia and Belarus.

- In 2010 the Halifax-class frigate will be using as much non-American equipment as possible, including technology from Canada, Sweden, Germany, the Netherlands and Israel. The ITAR have also been blamed for the delay of the CH-148 Cyclone which is currently two years behind the original schedule.
- In 2010 the Sikorsky CH-148 Cyclone helicopter was faced with delays and restrictions. The first 19 of the 28 CH-148 Cyclones will be delivered in an interim standard which does not meet the original contract requirements.

=== Restrictions on dual and third country nationals ===
The restrictions on access to USML items by dual and third country national employees of a foreign person can cause significant difficulties because the current accepted definitions of dual and third country nationals do not reflect the definition of "US persons". The Department of State defines dual and third country nationality as follows:

- Third country national: an individual holding nationality from a country or countries other than the country of the foreign signatory to the agreement; and
- Dual national: holds nationality from the country of a foreign signatory and one or more additional foreign countries.

Although "nationality" is not defined under ITAR, it is accepted that the U.S. Government will take country of origin and continued ties or allegiance to a country into account when determining dual or third country nationality.

This means that a person who was born in the UK but is a U.S. permanent resident working in the U.S. for a U.S. company will be considered a U.S. person only (under the definition of "US person"). If, however, the same person emigrated to Canada, obtained Canadian citizenship and commenced employment with a Canadian company, she would be treated as a Canadian-British dual national for the purposes of any U.S. export authorization to which her employer was a party. If she did not obtain Canadian citizenship but instead became a temporary or permanent Canadian resident, she would be treated as a British third country national for the purposes of such U.S. export authorization.

It is also possible for a person who was born in one country to become a dual national for the purposes of ITAR without necessarily leaving his country of origin, simply by obtaining a foreign passport (thereby "holding nationality" from another country). This is frequently the case where the individual's parent/s were born in a country that grants citizenship to children of its citizens, regardless of where the children were born, for example, a child born in Canada to parents who were born in the UK is able to obtain a British passport (see British nationality law). Once he has done so, he becomes a Canadian-British dual national for the purposes of ITAR.

Restrictions on access to USML items by dual and third country national employees of foreign persons essentially forces foreign persons to discriminate against their employees who do not meet the nationality criteria under an export authorization. Such discrimination may be illegal in some countries under anti-discrimination law (such as in Canada and Australia).

In addition, the prohibition on access by dual and third country nationals from countries proscribed under ITAR 126.1 can cause problems for countries with large immigrant populations from those countries (such as Canada and Australia, which both have large Overseas Chinese and Overseas Vietnamese immigrant populations: see immigration to Canada and immigration to Australia).

The U.S. Government actively enforces restrictions on access to USML items by dual and third country nationals. Example: General Dynamics Land Systems was fined US$20m in 2004 for breaches of the AECA by its predecessor, GM Defense, that included access to USML items by unauthorized dual nationals. The unauthorized access had included direct access to USML items and access to international computer systems on which USML items were stored by dual nationals from countries including Syria and the PRC.

=== ITAR and information technology ===
The ease with which USML items can be exported and retransferred using computer networks and removable media significantly increases the risk of unauthorized retransfer of USML items. As discussed above, carrying a laptop computer which contains USML items overseas is considered a retransfer of those items. Likewise, access to USML items on corporate systems, such as intranets, by foreign persons overseas or in the U.S., is considered a Retransfer of the items. Foreign employees working in the US cannot have access to the same network where ITAR data may be stored, nor may they have access to rooms or facilities where ITAR work is being done.

In both cases, theoretical access to the USML items overseas or by foreign persons is sufficient to constitute a breach of ITAR. Files on a laptop carried overseas do not need to be opened overseas, and foreign persons do not need to have actual access to USML items on computer networks for a breach to occur.

Theoretical access to USML items by foreign persons (including dual and third country nationals) can create difficulties for the engagement of IT professionals from overseas as network administrators or the use of overseas companies to support IT systems. This also creates significant challenges for manufacturers of ITAR-related items with respect to hiring practices. Avoiding discrimination while screening applicants for their ability to access ITAR materials can often be an HR nightmare.

On June 12, 2026, the US government suspended access to Claude Fable to foreign nationals, citing national security concerns.

=== Satellite components ===
Before 1992, satellite components were classified as munitions, and ITAR export compliance was controlled by the State Department. After the Space Shuttle Challenger disaster resulted in a growing backlog of commercial satellite launches, ITAR kept the Soviet Union out of the market. In September 1988, U.S. President Ronald Reagan agreed to allow U.S. satellites to be launched on Chinese rockets. Communications satellites were gradually transferred from the State Department to the Commerce Department in 1992–1996, falling under the Export Administration Regulations.

After the failed launches of Apstar 2 (1995) and Intelsat 708 (1996), both on Chinese rockets, the satellite insurance companies required the satellite manufacturers to work with China to investigate the failures. The Commerce Department determined that the "export" of information as part of the failure analysis complied with the export license. However, the Justice Department maintained that a separate export license was required in addition to the original launch license. In 1998, Congress reclassified satellite technology as a munition and returned it to the control of the State Department under ITAR. Space Systems/Loral paid a $20 million fine in 2002 for Intelsat 708, and Hughes paid a $32 million fine in 2003 for Apstar 2. The ChinaSat 8 satellite, which had been scheduled for launch in April 1999 on a Long March 3B rocket, was placed in storage for a decade and finally launched on an Ariane 5 rocket in 2008.

China used the results of the insurance investigation to improve the reliability of its Long March rockets, which would not experience another mission failure until 2011. ITAR has been blamed for "destroy[ing] an industry," reducing the market share of U.S. satellite makers by almost 25% from 1997 to 2007. The European company Thales Alenia Space developed a line of ITAR-free satellites that used no restricted U.S. components, allowing them to be launched on Chinese rockets between 2005 and 2012. However, the U.S. Department of State did not accept the ITAR-free status of these satellites and fined the US company Aeroflex $8 million for selling ITAR components. Thales Alenia was forced to discontinue its ITAR-free satellite line in 2013.

In May 2014, the United States Department of State reclassified satellites and several related components so they will no longer be treated as munitions whose export is controlled by ITAR, but will be covered instead under the Export Administration Regulations. Restrictions were loosened on 36 countries, strict controls remained on another 150 countries, and exports remained prohibited to 20 countries. An official at the Bureau of Industry and Security emphasized that "no U.S.-origin content, regardless of significance, regardless of whether it’s incorporated into a foreign-made item, can go to China". Thales Alenia had long complained that "every satellite nut and bolt" was being classified as ITAR-restricted, and the European Space Agency accused the United States of having no real interest in protecting U.S. satellite technology.

ITAR remains a major concern in the European aerospace industry as of 2016. The European Space Agency and the Japanese Aerospace Exploration Agency have supplied components that were launched on Chinese rockets. European manufacturers of satellite components report that ITAR-free status is the first question they are asked by potential customers. Even U.S. companies have expressed interest in ITAR-free technology. The Chinese space industry has been able to sell in the global market by bundling Chinese satellites with Chinese rockets, avoiding ITAR.

== See also ==
- Arms Export Control Act
- CoCom
- Defense Security Cooperation Agency
- Under Secretary for Arms Control and International Security
- Export Control Classification Number
- Export Administration Regulations
