= Apstar 2 =

Failed geostationary communications satellite

APstar 2
Spacecraft properties
- Manufacturer: Boeing; Hughes Space and Communications Company

Start of mission
- Launch date: January 26, 1995
- Rocket: Chang Zheng 2E
- Launch site: Xichang LA-2
- Contractor: APT Satellite Holdings

Orbital parameters
- Reference system: Geocentric
- Regime: Geostationary

Transponders
- Band: 26 C band 8 K_{u} band
- TWTA power: 52W (C band); 50-120W (K_{u} band)

APstar 2 (Asia-Pacific Star 2) was a communications satellite based on the Hughes HS-601 spacecraft design, built by Hughes Space and Communications Company for APT Satellite Holdings, a Hong Kong–based company. The satellite was intended to provide video, radio, data, and telephone services to about two-thirds of the world's population. It was launched on January 26, 1995, by a Long March 2E launch vehicle from Xichang Satellite Launch Center in China, but was destroyed 51 seconds after liftoff when the rocket exploded. Falling debris from the rocket killed at least six villagers on the ground and injured 23. Together with Intelsat 708, a similar failed launch at Xichang with at least six fatalities, it is the deadliest accident of the Chinese space program.

The Hughes Failure Investigation Team found that excess vibration had caused a rocket fairing to fail due to a structural deficiency. However, the Chinese blamed the rocket-satellite interface for the failure. The two sides agreed that the fairing and the satellite interface would both be improved. The Long March 2E rocket would be retired at the end of 1995.

== Background ==
After the 1986 Space Shuttle Challenger disaster, the US Government decided that commercial satellite payloads would not be launched on Space Shuttles, forcing satellite producers to use expendable rocket systems instead. At that time, China also began its entry into the international space market.

On November 18, 1993, Hughes submitted an application for export license to the Bureau of Export Administration, United States Department of Commerce. On February 1, 1994, the license was validated. The license permitted the export of one Hughes Model HS-601 commercial communications satellite to the Asia Pacific Telecommunications Satellite Company, Ltd., Hong Kong. The intermediate consignee was China Great Wall Industry Corporation, Beijing, PRC.

== Political effects ==
The APstar 2 failure investigation caused great political controversy in the United States. The export of satellite technology had previously been controlled by the State Department under the International Traffic in Arms Regulations, but it was being transferred to the Commerce Department under the Export Administration Regulations. Hughes had received a license from the Commerce Department in 1993 to export the satellite temporarily to China for launch. Hughes also gave the Commerce Department a copy of the failure investigation report and received Commerce approval to export it to China. However, the Commerce Department had noted that some areas still required State Department approval, and Hughes lawyers had also questioned whether they needed a State Department license.

The U.S. government launched an inquiry into the APstar 2 and Intelsat 708 launch failure investigations. In 1998, the U.S. Congress reclassified satellite technology as a munition and returned it to the control of the State Department under the International Traffic in Arms Regulations. No export licenses to China have been issued since 1996, and an official at the Bureau of Industry and Security emphasized in 2016 that "no U.S.-origin content, regardless of significance, regardless of whether it’s incorporated into a foreign-made item, can go to China." The Justice Department launched a criminal investigation in 1999 of export violations by Hughes. In 2003, Boeing paid $32 million in fines to settle the case, having acquired Hughes in 2000.
