= Satellite insurance =

Branch of aviation insurance

Satellite insurance is a specialized branch of aviation insurance in which, as of 2000, about 20 insurers worldwide participate directly. Others participate through reinsurance contracts with direct providers. It covers three risks: relaunching the satellite if the launch operation fails; replacing the satellite if it is destroyed, positioned in an improper orbit, or fails in orbit; and liability for damage to third parties caused by the satellite or the launch vehicle.

In 1965 the first satellite insurance was placed with Lloyd's of London to cover physical damages on pre-launch for the "Early Bird" satellite Intelsat I. In 1968 coverage was arranged for pre-launch and launch perils for the Intelsat III satellite. Satellites are very complex machines which are manufactured and used by governments and a few larger companies. The budget for a typical satellite project can be in excess of billions of dollars and can run 5–10 years including the planning, manufacturing, testing, and launch.

== Types of coverage ==
Insurance available for satellites is divided into two sections, satellite coverage and ground risk coverage.

=== Satellite risk ===
Satellite risk coverage is insurance against damage to the satellite itself. There are four basic types of coverage available in this section.

- Pre-launch insurance provides coverage for loss or damage to the satellite or its components from the time they leave the manufacturer's premises, during the transit to the launch site, through testing, fueling, and integration with the launcher up until the time the launcher's rocket engines are ignited for the purpose of the actual launch.
- Launch insurance provides coverage for the period from the intentional ignition of the engines until the satellite separates from the final stage of the launch vehicle, or it may continue until completion of the testing phase in orbit. Coverage typically runs for a period of twelve months, but is limited to 45–60 days in respect to the testing phase in orbit. Launch failure is the greatest probability of satellite loss and approximately 7% of satellites have failed on launch.
- Coverage while in orbit provides for physical loss, damage, or even failure of the insured satellite while in orbit or during orbit placement. Elements of risk attached to satellites during orbit are damage caused by objects in the hostile space environment, extremes of temperature, and radiation. Because it is not typically possible to repair a satellite once it is physically placed in orbit, the coverage is basically granted as a product guarantee.
- Third party liability is the final section of the policy, and is a statutory requirement of the Government of the nation where the launch will take place, regardless of the nationality of the satellite owner. A special license must be provided to the regulating authorities before a launch can take place. Coverage usually runs up to 90 days following the actual launch. Loss of revenue coverage is also available but is not purchased often.

=== Ground risk ===
As many ground stations are run by large government entities such as NASA, failure on the part of the insured is rare. In cases where failure occurs due to events which are beyond the control of the insured (such as an earthquake), coverage provides for the cost of hiring premises, replacing computer systems, software backup, and other items necessary to resume operations.

== Underwriting considerations ==
When considering a rating structure for satellite insurance coverage, during the early days many insurers based their rating according to the launch vehicle. For example, if the launch vehicle being used had a one in ten failure rate, the insurance premium would be ten per cent of the gross cost. Today, insurers use statistics and computer modeling to arrive at premium rates, although data for calculations is limited. Another aspect of satellite insurance is the procedure attached to salvage. Though it is impossible to obtain monetary value from the wreckage in the event of an actual total loss or constructive total loss, many insurers rely on sharing any revenue which may be obtainable from the failed satellite with the insured.

== Regulation ==
Rules of satellite launch technology is governed by International Traffic in Arms Regulation (ITAR) in the United States. This regulation states that the details of any technology provided to insurance underwriters are subject to strict rules and are provided to selected insurers only. This is an important consideration as the structure and technology used on launch vehicles is similar to missile technology for weapons. Failure to comply with ITAR rules could result in heavy fines and imprisonment. In cases where reinsurance coverage is arranged, re-insurers who provide such coverage have to rely on very limited information.
