= YF-1 =

Chinese liquid rocket engine

YF-1B
- Country of origin: China
- Date: 1958-1969
- Designer: Academy of Aerospace Liquid Propulsion Technology, Ren Xinmin, Mo Tso-hsin, Zhang Guitian
- Associated LV: DF-3A, DF-4 and Long March 1
- Predecessor: С2.1100
- Successor: YF-20
- Status: Retired

Liquid-fuel engine
- Propellant: N_{2}O_{4} / UDMH
- Cycle: Gas Generator

Configuration
- Chamber: 1
- Nozzle ratio: 10

Performance
- Thrust, vacuum: 303.6 kN (68,300 lbf)
- Thrust, sea-level: 275.3 kN (61,900 lbf)
- Chamber pressure: 7.1 MPa (1,030 psi)
- Specific impulse, vacuum: 267.4 seconds (2.622 km/s)
- Specific impulse, sea-level: 242.5 seconds (2.378 km/s)
- Burn time: 140s

Dimensions
- Diameter: 56 centimetres (22 in)

Used in
- DF-3A, DF-4 and Long March 1 first stage.

The YF-1 was a Chinese liquid rocket engine burning N_{2}O_{4} and UDMH in a gas generator cycle. It is a basic engine which when mounted in a four engine module forms the YF-2. It was used as the basis for developing a high altitude version known as the YF-3.

Some authors state that it was a direct copy of С.2.1100/С.2.1150 La-350 booster engine developed by Isayev OKB-2 (NII-88). What is known is that the engine development had great trouble with combustion instabilities and it took a long time to have a reliable combustion.

== Versions ==
The basic engine has been used since the DF-3 rocket and has been the main propulsion of the Long March 1 orbital launch vehicles.

- YF-1: Core engine. Flown originally on the DF-3. Used UDMH/AK27S as propellant. Allegedly a copy of OKB-2's С.2.1150.
- YF-1A: Core engine. Improved version that would power the DF-3A, DF-4 and Long March 1.
- YF-1B: Core engine. Improved version used on the Long March 1D. Switched propellants to UDMH/N_{2}O_{4}
- YF-3: Upper stage version. Used on the DF-4.
- YF-3A: Improved upper stage version. Used on the Long March 1.

== Modules ==
While the basic engine was used multiple times, it was only used as a single engine for booster application. It is usually bundled into modules of multiple engines.

The relevant modules for first stage application are:

- YF-2: A module comprising four YF-1. Flown originally on the DF-3.
- YF-2A: A module comprising four YF-1A. Improved version. Used on the DF-3A, DF-4 and Long March 1.
- YF-2B: A module comprising four YF-1B. Improved version. Final version used on the Long March 1D.

== See also ==
- DF-3A
- DF-4
- Long March 1 (rocket family)
- Long March 1
- Long March 1D
