= FG-02 =

Chinese composite rocket propellant

- Country of origin: China
- Date: 1966-1970
- First flight: 1970-04-24
- Last flight: 1971-03-03
- Designer: China Hexi Chemical and Machinery Corporation
- Application: Upper stage
- Associated LV: Long March 1
- Status: Retired

Solid-fuel motor
- Propellant: AP / Polysulfide

Configuration
- Chamber: 1

Performance
- Thrust, vacuum: 118 kN (27,000 lbf)
- Specific impulse, vacuum: 254 s (2.49 km/s)
- Total impulse: 4,500 kN (1,000,000 lb_{f})
- Burn time: 38s
- Propellant capacity: 1,806 kg (3,982 lb)

Dimensions
- Length: 3.95 m (156 in)
- Diameter: 0.77 m (30 in)
- Empty mass: 246 kg (542 lb)

Used in
- Long March 1 third stage.

The FG-02 was a Chinese solid rocket motor burning polysulfide polymer-based composite propellant. It was developed by China Hexi Chemical and Machinery Corporation (also known as the 6th Academy of CASIC) for use in the Long March 1 third stage. It has a total nominal mass of 2,052 kg (4,524 lb), of which 1,806 kg (3,982 lb) is propellant load. It has an average thrust of 118 kN (27,000 lbf) with a specific impulse of 254 seconds burning for 38 seconds, with a total impulse of 4,500 kN (1,000,000 lb_{f}). It used spin stabilization and a timing device to ignite in flight.

The Long March 1 is basically a DF-4 with a solid third stage and a fairing. So the FG-02 was developed as the third stage to add to the stack. It was initially tested on two launches aboard T-7A sounding rockets to validate high altitude ignitions. Both successful flights were performed in August 1968. Before going into the launch vehicle, the propellant load was increased from 900 kg (2,000 lb) to 1,806 kg (3,982 lb). It performed just two orbital flights, both from Jiuquan and both successful. The first was on April 24, 1970, to orbit the indigenous satellite, the Dong Fang Hong I. And the second was on March 3, 1971, on the Shijian 1 mission.

== See also ==
- Dong Fang Hong I
- Long March 1
