= Tianhui =

Tianhui may refer to:

- Tianhui (satellite), a military Chinese series of Earth observation satellites
  - Tianhui 1B, a satellite

== Historical eras ==
- Tianhui (天會, 957–973), era name used by the Northern Han emperors Liu Chengjun, Liu Ji'en and Liu Jiyuan
- Tianhui (天會, 1123–1137), era name used by Emperor Taizong of Jin and Emperor Xizong of Jin
