= Taiyuan Launch Complex 1 =

Launch Complex 1
- Launch site: Taiyuan
- Short name: LC-1
- Launch pad: One
Launch history
- Status: Active
- Known launches: 29
- First launch: 6 September 1988
- Last launch: 22 April 2009
- Associated rockets: Long March 4A; Long March 1D; Long March 2C; Long March 4B; Long March 4C

Launch Complex 1, also known as Pad 1, is a Long March launch complex at the Taiyuan Satellite Launch Centre.

== History ==
It consists of a single launch pad, which has been used by Long March 2C, Long March 4A, Long March 4B and Long March 4C carrier rockets. Until the activation of Launch Complex 2 in 2008, it was the only launch site for Long March 4 rockets. Long March 4 launches have since also occurred from Jiuquan.

The first spacecraft to be launched from LC-1 was Fengyun 1A, on the maiden flight of the Long March 4A, on 19 November 1999. The Long March 4A was retired in 1990 after just two launches. Between 1995 and 2002 three Long March 1D rockets were launched from Taiyuan on suborbital flights, and orbital launches resumed in the late 1990s when seven Long March 2C/SD rockets were launched; the first on a test flight, and the six subsequent launches each carrying two Iridium satellites. Long March 4 launches resumed in 1999, with the Long March 4B and later the Long March 4C. The most recent launch from the complex was on 22 April 2009, when a Long March 2C launched the Yaogan 6 satellite.
