= T-7 (rocket) =

China's first sounding rocket

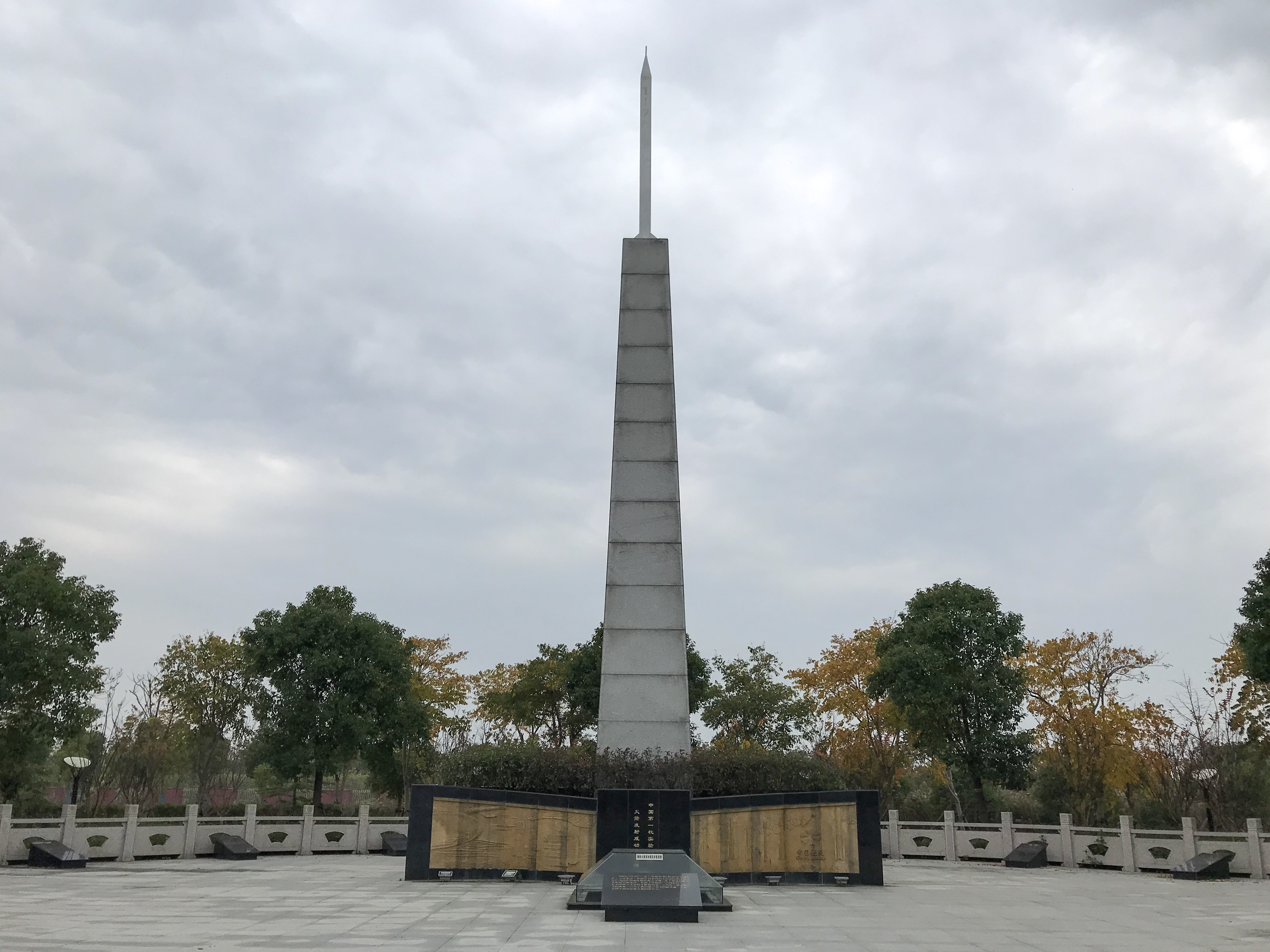
Monument for the T-7M sounding rocket in Laogang, Pudong, Shanghai, the site of its successful launch in 1960

The T-7 was China's first sounding rocket. A test rocket, dubbed the T-7M, was first successfully launched on 19 February 1960 in Nanhui, Shanghai, and a full-scale rocket was launched on 13 September 1960. Wang Xiji of the Shanghai Institute of Mechanical and Electrical Engineering was the chief designer. Twenty-four T-7 rockets were launched between 1960 and 1965, and it was retired after a final launch in 1969.

== Specifications ==
The T-7 was designed to carry a payload of 25 kilograms (55 lb) to an altitude of 58 kilometres (36 mi). It had a length of 8 metres (26 ft), a launch weight of 1,138 kilograms (2,509 lb) and a diameter of 45 centimetres (18 in).

== History ==
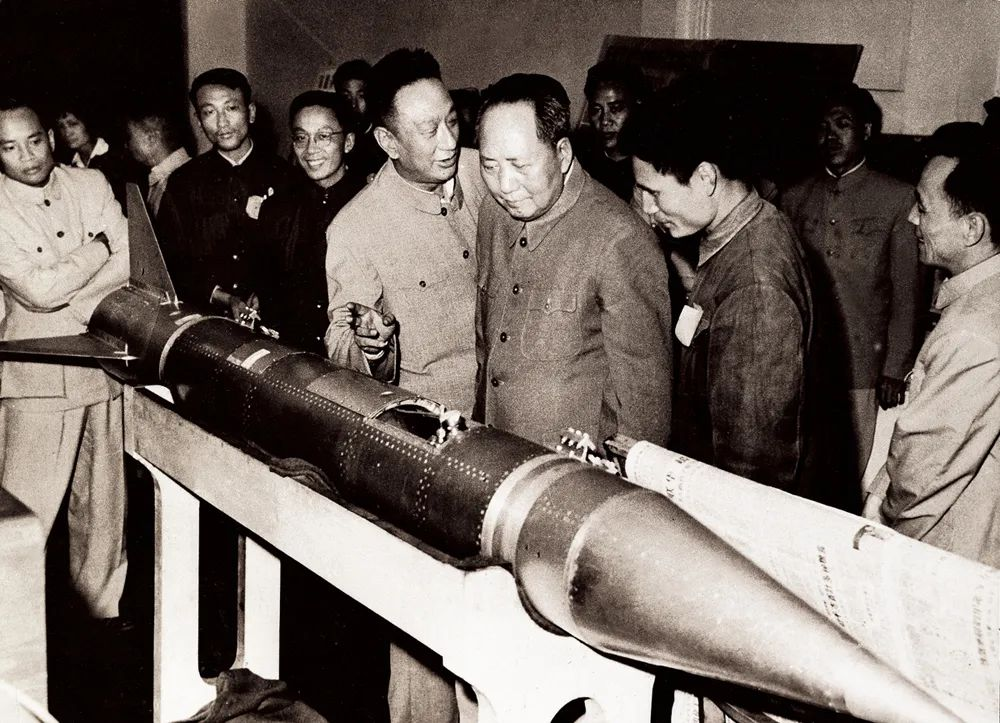
T-7M is shown to Chairman Mao Zedong, 28 May 1960

In 1958, China started its satellite program and tasked the Shanghai Institute of Mechanical and Electrical Engineering with the development of rockets for satellite launches. Wang Xiji, a professor of the Department of Engineering Mechanics at Shanghai Jiao Tong University, was appointed the chief engineer in charge of the rocket development, and Yang Nansheng was appointed deputy director of the institute in charge of the overall program including the launch site.

The institute had very few experienced scientists. Other than Wang and Yang, there were only two visiting professors, Bian Yingui (卞荫贵) and Li Minhua. The rest of the institute consisted of a few hundred university students with an average age of 21. Even Wang and Yang had little knowledge about rockets and had to learn on the fly.

The development team worked with severe shortages of technical experience, funds, and equipment. They often worked in hunger as China was in the midst of the Great Famine. They performed calculations using hand-cranked mechanical computers as the team did not have an electronic computer, and a single ballistics calculation could take more than forty days. The launch site, located at Laogang in Nanhui County outside Shanghai, consisted of a sandbag bunker and a power generator. People at the launch bunker communicated with the tracking sites by relayed shouting or hand signals, and the rocket's liquid fuel tank was pressurised using a bicycle pump.

After a failed first launch in January 1960, the second launch on 19 February 1960 was successful. This small-scale test rocket, dubbed the T7-M, was China's first sounding rocket, and it reached an altitude of 8.0 kilometres (5.0 mi). This success, achieved by a group of young engineers without the help of Soviet experts, impressed Mao Zedong.

In March 1960, a launch site was built in Guangde County, Anhui for the full-scale T-7, which was successfully launched on 13 September 1960. After several further test launches, including a few failures, the rocket reached the design altitude of 58 kilometres (36 mi) on 23 November 1961. Its designed payload was 25 kilograms (55 lb).

24 T-7 rockets were launched in total from 1960 to 1965, including nine carrying meteorological payloads. The rocket was retired after a final launch in 1969.

== Aftermath ==
The experience gained from developing the T-7 contributed greatly to the development of the Long March 1, the rocket that launched China's first satellite. After their success with T-7, Wang Xiji and his team were transferred to Beijing and Wang was appointed the chief designer of the Long March 1. He again collaborated with Yang Nansheng, and the Long March 1 successfully launched the Dong Fang Hong I satellite in 1970.
