= Wang Xiji =

Chinese aerospace engineer (1921–2026)

- 王希季
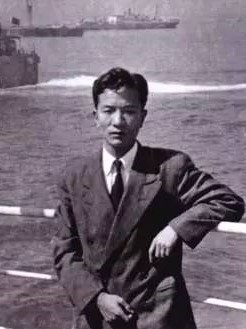
- Wang in 1950, on board the ship that carried him back to China from the United States
- Born: 26 July 1921; Kunming, Yunnan, China
- Died: 12 August 2026 (aged 105); Beijing, China
- Education: Virginia Tech; National Southwestern Associated University
- Occupation: Aerospace engineer

Wang Xiji (Chinese: 王希季; Wade–Giles: Wang Hsi-chi; 26 July 1921 – 12 August 2026) was a Chinese aerospace engineer. The chief designer of China's first sounding rocket (T-7), first space launch vehicle (Long March 1) and first recoverable satellites, he was awarded the Two Bombs, One Satellite Meritorious Medal in 1999. He was an academician of the Chinese Academy of Sciences and the International Academy of Astronautics, and was inducted into the International Astronautical Federation Hall of Fame in 2016.

== Early life and education ==
Wang was born on 26 July 1921 into a merchant family in Kunming, Yunnan, China. He was a member of the Bai ethnic minority from Dali Bai Autonomous Prefecture. He graduated from the Department of Mechanical Engineering of National Southwestern Associated University in 1942, and went to the United States in 1948 to study at the Virginia Polytechnic Institute, earning his master's degree in 1949. When the People's Republic of China was founded, he abandoned his doctoral studies and returned to China in 1950.

== Career ==
=== Sounding rockets ===
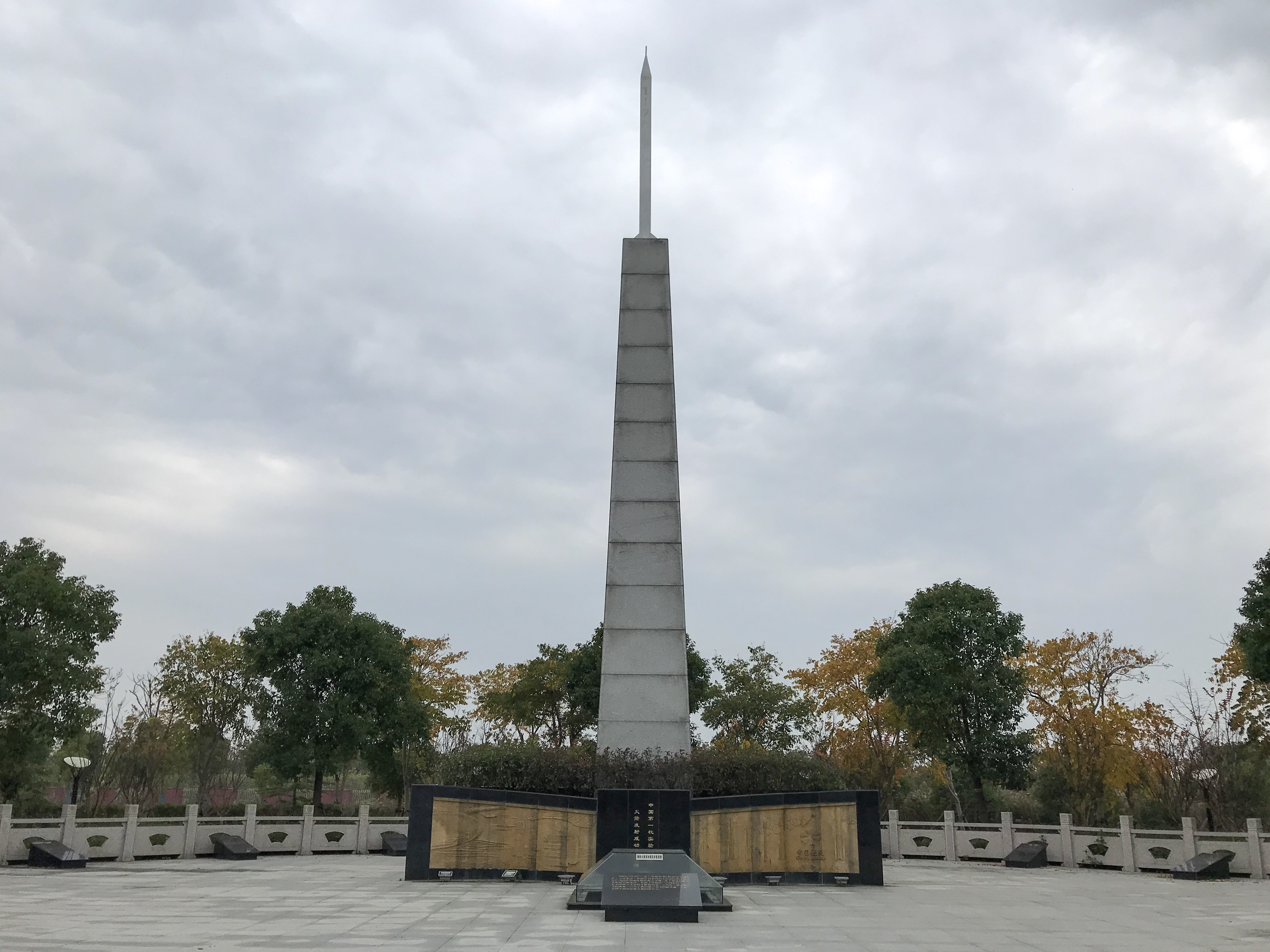
Monument for the T-7M, China's first sounding rocket, in Laogang, Pudong, Shanghai

After returning to China, Wang taught at the Dalian Institute of Technology, Shanghai Jiao Tong University, and Shanghai University of Science and Technology. In 1958, when Wang was serving as professor and vice chair of the Department of Engineering Mechanics at Shanghai Jiao Tong University, he was abruptly appointed chief engineer of the Shanghai Institute of Mechanical and Electrical Engineering. Only after he arrived at his new workplace did he learn that China had started its satellite program and the institute was responsible for developing rockets for satellite launches. The institute had very few experienced scientists. Other than Wang Xiji and his former classmate Yang Nansheng, who was the deputy director of the institute, there were only two visiting professors, Bian Yingui (卞荫贵) and Li Minhua. The rest of the institute consisted of a few hundred university students with an average age of 21. Even Wang and Yang had little knowledge about rockets and had to learn on the fly.

Working with severe shortages of technical experience, funds, and equipment, Wang's team managed to develop China's first sounding rocket, the T-7M. After a failed first launch in January 1960, the second launch on 19 February 1960 was successful. Wang later developed 12 types of sounding rockets, including many recoverable and reusable designs.

=== Space launch vehicle and recoverable satellites ===
In the 1960s, Wang proposed the design for the Long March 1, China's first space launch vehicle, which launched China's first satellite, the Dong Fang Hong I, in 1970. He subsequently led the design of China's first recoverable satellite, the Jian Bing 1. After an initial failure in 1974, it was successfully launched in 1975, making China the third country in the world to launch a recoverable satellite. Wang's recoverable satellites achieved a higher success rate than the Corona (Discoverer) program of the United States and the Zenit series of the Soviet Union.

=== Crewed spacecraft ===
In the late 1960s, Wang proposed the Shuguang project for crewed spacecraft. Although initially approved by Mao Zedong, it was later cancelled in 1973 due to a shortage of funds. When China restarted the Shenzhou program in 1992, Wang served as a senior supervisor of the project, which succeeded in putting the first Chinese astronaut into orbit in 2003.

=== Other programs ===
In 2002, Wang chaired a national policy committee that created a report outlining the future directions for the space and missile programs of China.

In 2015, Wang proposed building a space-based solar power station with at least 5–6 square kilometres (1.9–2.3 sq mi) of solar panels, 36,000 kilometres (22,000 mi) above earth. The energy would be transmitted to earth in the form of microwave or laser. The idea first appeared in Isaac Asimov's 1941 science fiction short story "Reason".

== Personal life ==
Wang was married to Nie Xiufang, with whom he had two daughters. Wang turned 100 in July 2021.

He died on 12 August 2026 in Beijing, at the age of 105. His funeral was held on 20 August at Babaoshan Revolutionary Cemetery.

== Honours and recognition ==
Wang was elected an academician of the International Academy of Astronautics and the Chinese Academy of Sciences in 1993.

He was twice conferred the Special Prize of the State Science and Technology Progress Award (in 1985 and 1990), in addition to a First Class prize and a Second Class prize. He was awarded the Ho Leung Ho Lee Prize for science and technology progress in 1995. In 1999, Wang was awarded the Two Bombs, One Satellite Meritorious Medal. In 2016, he became the first Chinese inductee into the International Astronautical Federation Hall of Fame.
