= Long March 1D =

Chinese space rocket

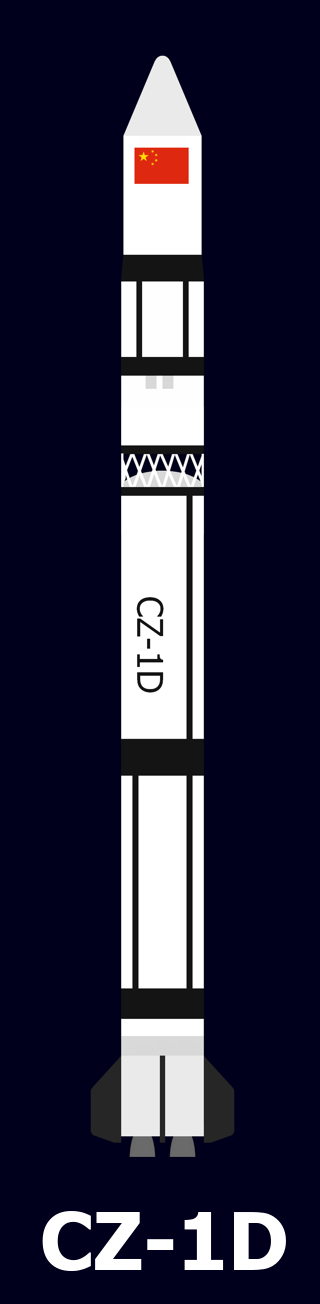
- Function: Small-lift launch vehicle
- Manufacturer: China Academy of Launch Vehicle Technology
- Country of origin: China

Size
- Height: 28.22 m (92.6 ft)
- Diameter: 2.25 m (7.4 ft)
- Mass: 81,650 kg (180,010 lb)
- Stages: 3

Capacity

Payload to LEO
- Mass: 930 kg (2,050 lb)

Associated rockets
- Family: Long March 1
- Comparable: Mu 1-3-4

Launch history
- Status: Retired
- Launch sites: Taiyuan LC-1
- Total launches: 3
- Success(es): 2
- Failure: 1
- First flight: 1 June 1995
- Last flight: 3 January 2002
- Carries passengers or cargo: reentry vehicle tests

First stage
- Height: 18.20 m (59.7 ft)
- Diameter: 2.25 m (7.4 ft)
- Empty mass: 4,100 kg (9,000 lb)
- Gross mass: 65,000 kg (143,000 lb)
- Propellant mass: 61,100 kg (134,700 lb)
- Powered by: 1 YF-2B (4 x YF-1B)
- Maximum thrust: SL: 1,101.2 kN (247,600 lb_{f}); Vac: 1,214.4 kN (273,000 lb_{f})
- Specific impulse: SL: 242.5 seconds (2.378 km/s); Vac: 267.4 seconds (2.622 km/s)
- Burn time: 131.5 seconds
- Propellant: UDMH/N_{2}O_{4}

Second stage
- Height: 6.04 m (19.8 ft)
- Diameter: 2.25 m (7.4 ft)
- Empty mass: 1,620 kg (3,570 lb)
- Gross mass: 14,000 kg (31,000 lb)
- Propellant mass: 12,380 kg (27,290 lb)
- Powered by: 2 YF-40
- Maximum thrust: 98.1 kN (22,100 lb_{f})
- Specific impulse: 295.2 seconds (2.895 km/s)
- Burn time: 365 seconds
- Propellant: UDMH/N_{2}O_{4}

Third stage
- Height: 1.7 m (5.6 ft)
- Diameter: 2.05 m (6.7 ft)
- Empty mass: 665 kg (1,466 lb)
- Gross mass: 1,315 kg (2,899 lb)
- Propellant mass: Main: 650 kg (1,430 lb); RCS: 147 kg (324 lb)
- Powered by: Main: FG-36 SRM; RCS: DaFY2-1 monopropellant thrusters
- Maximum thrust: 44 kN (9,900 lb_{f})
- Specific impulse: 289 seconds (2.83 km/s)
- Burn time: 43 seconds
- Propellant: Main: HTPB/AP; RCS: hydrazine

The Long March 1D was a member of China's Long March rocket family. During the 1990s CALT developed an improved version of the DF-4 to test the reentry vehicle warheads of the DF-31. They took advantage of this development and offered it as the Long March 1D for commercial application.

== History ==
The Long March 1D shared its name with the original Long March 1, which flew three times from Jiuquan: a suborbital research flight on 10 January 1970, then the launches of the Dong Fang Hong 1 satellite on 24 April 1970 and Shi Jian 1 on 3 March 1971. Unlike its namesake, the 1D launched only from Taiyuan, and all of its flights were suborbital reentry tests.

An DF-4 improved first stage, which used the new version of the YF-2B, and switched propellants to UDMH/N_{2}O_{4} for improved performance. The replacement of the DF-4 second stage motor YF-3A. The proposed replacement was the Long March 4 third stage engine, the YF-40. A new inline inter-stage would replace the existing tapered connector between the second and third stages, which allowed for an additional 70 cm diameter to be added to the third stage skirt. This would allow for the addition of RCS to the third stage. A new third stage with a new motor, the FG-36 and an optional RCS. A new computer inertial guidance system which enabled the third stage to be 3-axis stabilised for added precision.

The new design did not have a good reception and was only used for reentry vehicle tests. It flew three suborbital missions from Taiyuan LC-1 with two successes and a failure on the final mission. The first launch was on June 1, 1995, and the second one was in November 1997. The final and failed launch was on January 3, 2002.
