= DF-3A =

Intermediate-range ballistic missile

DF-3A/CSS-2(US)
- Type: IRBM
- Place of origin: China

Service history
- In service: 1971–2014 (China); 1988–present (Saudi Arabia)
- Used by: China, Saudi Arabia

Specifications
- Length: 24 m
- Warhead: Nuclear, possibly 3 × 50–100 kt (0.21–0.42 PJ) warheads or 1 × 700–3,000 kt (2.9–12.6 PJ) warhead
- Engine: liquid fueled (4x YF-1 rocket engines)
- Operational range: 4,000-5,000 km
- Guidance system: Astro-inertial guidance
- Accuracy: 0.6-2.4 miles (1000-4000 m) CEP

The DF-3A (NATO: CSS-2) is a Chinese liquid-fueled, single-stage, nuclear-capable intermediate-range ballistic missile. It entered service with the People's Liberation Army Rocket Force in 1971, and its units were fully converted to the DF-21 by 2014. The missile was used as the basis for China's first launch vehicle, the Long March 1.

== History ==
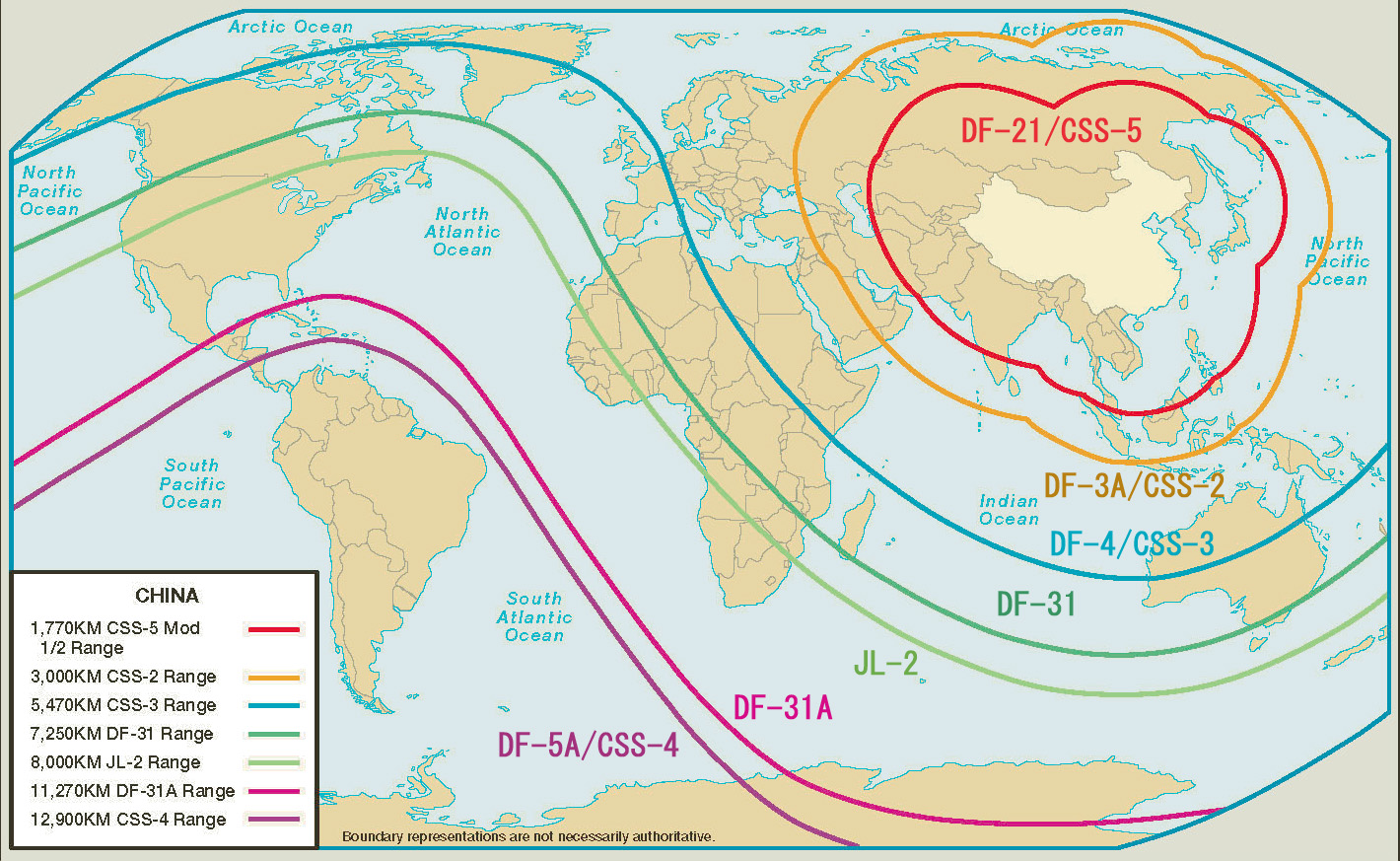
Range of various Chinese missiles (2007); DF-3A range in Orange.

Initial production of the DF-3 was rushed due to the Zhenbao/Damansky Island conflict with the Soviet Union. Supplied without a proof test, the weapons were initially rejected by the Second Artillery. A proof test was completed in 1973.

Deployment of the missile began in 1971, reaching a peak of 110 by 1984, then shrinking to 50 in 1993. It was estimated by the U.S. DoD that there were 17 missiles and 10 launchers in operation as of 2010 under a single brigade. By May 2014, it appeared that the last unit operating the DF-3A completed conversion to the DF-21 missile from satellite photos of changes to the launch unit site.

The missile was used as the basis for China's first launch vehicle, the Long March 1, which launched China's first satellite, Dong Fang Hong 1, in 1970.

== Users ==
China
People's Liberation Army Rocket Force
Saudi Arabia
Royal Saudi Strategic Missile Force
- In 1988 China sold several dozen (reportedly between 36 and 60) DF-3A missiles to Saudi Arabia. Saudi Arabia publicly displayed them for the first time in 2014.

Preceded by DF-3	DF-3A	Succeeded by DF-4
