= FG-36 =

Chinese rocket engine

FG-15B
- Country of origin: China
- First flight: 1986-02-02
- Designer: China Hexi Chemical and Machinery Corporation
- Application: Apogee kick motor
- Associated LV: Long March 1D
- Predecessor: FG-15
- Successor: FG-46
- Status: Out of production

Solid-fuel motor
- Propellant: AP / HTPB

Configuration
- Chamber: 1

Performance
- Thrust, vacuum: 44 kN (9,900 lbf)
- Specific impulse, vacuum: 289 s (2.83 km/s)
- Total impulse: 1.842 MN (414,000 lb_{f})
- Burn time: 43s
- Propellant capacity: 650 kg (1,430 lb)

Dimensions
- Length: 1,529 mm (60.2 in)
- Diameter: 896 mm (35.3 in)
- Empty mass: 79 kg (174 lb)

Used in
- Fengyun 2 APK and Long March 1D third stage.

The FG-36 (AKA Fengyun 2 AKM) was a Chinese spin stabilized apogee kick motor burning HTPB-based composite propellant. It was developed by China Hexi Chemical and Machinery Corporation (also known as the 6th Academy of CASIC) for use in the Fengyun 2 satellite bus for insertion into GSO orbit.

It has a total nominal mass of 729 kg (1,607 lb), of which 650 kg (1,430 lb) is propellant load and its burn out mass is 79 kg (174 lb). It has an average thrust of 44 kN (9,900 lbf) with a specific impulse of 289 seconds burning for 43 seconds, with a total impulse of 1.842 MN (414,000 lb_{f}). While it was designed as an apogee kick motor and as such it flew in spin stabilized mode, it was also adapted to the Long March 1D third stage. It was paired with a RCS in a similar solution to the CTS.

== See also ==
- Fengyun 2
- Long March 1D
- CTS
