= FG-15 =

FG-15B
- Country of origin: China
- First flight: 1986-02-02
- Designer: China Hexi Chemical and Machinery Corporation
- Application: Apogee kick motor
- Associated LV: Long March 3
- Predecessor: FG-02
- Successor: FG-36
- Status: Out of Production

Solid-fuel motor
- Propellant: AP / HTPB
- Casing: Fiberglass

Configuration
- Chamber: 1

Performance
- Thrust, vacuum: 40.9 kN (9,200 lbf)
- Specific impulse, vacuum: 289 s (2.83 km/s)
- Total impulse: 1.432 MN (322,000 lb_{f})
- Burn time: 35s
- Propellant capacity: 505 kg (1,113 lb)

Dimensions
- Length: 1,489 mm (58.6 in)
- Diameter: 896 mm (35.3 in)
- Empty mass: 75 kg (165 lb)

Used in
- Dong Fang Hong 2

The FG-15 (AKA DFH-2 AKM and SpaB-170) was a Chinese spin stabilized apogee kick motor burning HTPB-based composite propellant. It was developed by China Hexi Chemical and Machinery Corporation (also known as the 6th Academy of CASIC) for use in the Dong Fang Hong 2 satellite bus for insertion into GSO orbit.

It has a total nominal mass of 580 kg (1,280 lb), of which 505 kg (1,113 lb) is propellant load and its burn out mass is 75 kg (165 lb). It has an average thrust of 40.9 kN (9,200 lbf) with a specific impulse of 289 seconds burning for 35 seconds, with a total impulse of 1.432 MN (322,000 lb_{f}). This motor introduced a series of innovations for the Chinese solid motor industry: first use of glass fibre wound cases, carbon/carbon nozzle throat insert material, contoured divergent nozzle, and non-destructive test of the motor grain.

The initial version had the manufacturing code FG-15 was associated to the DFH-2 bus and flew twice. The FG-15B was used by the DFH-2A bus and flew five times.

Date	Carrier Rocket	Motor	Launch site	Mission	Result
1984-01-29	Long March 3	FG-15	Xichang Satellite Launch Center	STTW-T1	Failure to ignite
1984-04-09	Long March 3	FG-15	Xichang Satellite Launch Center	STTW-T2	Success
1986-02-02	Long March 3	FG-15B	Xichang Satellite Launch Center	DFH-2A-T1	Success
1988-03-09	Long March 3	FG-15B	Xichang Satellite Launch Center	ChinaSat-1 (DFH-2A-T2)	Success
1998-12-24	Long March 3	FG-15B	Xichang Satellite Launch Center	DFH-2A-T3	Success
1990-02-05	Long March 3	FG-15B	Xichang Satellite Launch Center	DFH-2A-T4	Success
1991-12-28	Long March 3	FG-15B	Xichang Satellite Launch Center	ChinaSat-4 (DFH-2A-T5)	Failure to ignite

== See also ==
- China Hexi Chemical and Machinery Corporation
- Dong Fang Hong 2
- Long March 3
