= CZ-1 =

CZ-1 may refer to:

- the Casio CZ-1 synthesizer
- the CZ-1 (Changzheng-1) missile
