= Long March 4 =

Series of Chinese rockets

Long March 4 (LM-4) rocket family or Chang Zheng 4 (CZ-4) rocket family is an expendable launch system within the Long March (rocket family) and is operated by the People's Republic of China. Three configuration variants currently exist: Long March 4A, Long March 4B, and Long March 4C.

== Development ==
Conceptual design of the Long March 4 began in 1978, and in March 1982 it was assigned as the launch vehicle for the Fengyun-1 meteorological satellite. Development was carried out by the Shanghai Administration of Astronautics together with the liquid rocket engine establishments of the Ministry of Aerospace Industry, and the rocket's chief designer was Sun Jingliang. The CZ-4 was offered with two payload fairing configurations, Type-A and Type-B, and its typical performance was about 1,650 kg to a 600 km Sun-synchronous orbit or 4,680 kg to a 200 km circular orbit. Its maiden flight on 6 September 1988 carried the 750 kg Fengyun 1A, and the last launch of the original version took place on 3 September 1990.

The Long March 4 rocket was originally developed as a backup to the CZ-3 for launch of the geostationary satellites, but was later adopted for the launch of remote-sensing satellites into sun synchronous orbits. CZ-4 was developed by the Shanghai Academy of Spaceflight Technology. CZ-4 is built on the design of the CZ-3C vehicle using its first two stages. The third stage adopts a UDMH/N2O4 storable propellant system using two gimbaled rocket engines as opposed the LH2/LO2 stage third stage employed on CZ-3C. The Long March 4A (CZ-4A) has a length of 41.9 meters and a maximum diameter of 3.35 meters.

The Long March 4B (CZ-4B) was introduced in the late 1990s for the launch of the Ziyuan 1 (CBERS 1) remote-sensing satellite. The CZ-4B is of similar design to the CZ-4A but adopts an updated payload fairing 8.48 meters in length and 3.35 meters in diameter to house large remote-sensing satellites. The Long March 4C (CZ-4C) was introduced in 2006 for the launch of Yaogan 1 reconnaissance satellites. The CZ-4C features an improved third-stage with multiple re-start capability to launch heavier satellites and multiple satellites on a single vehicle. Improvements include a third-stage using the YF-40A engine with multiple restart capability, enhanced propellant management, new flight computer and guidance systems, and an automated launch control system.

== Launch history ==
Launch statistics for the Long March 4 rocket family (through December 2025).

- Long March 4A
- Long March 4B
- Long March 4C

Long March 4 (rocket family)
Derivative	Status	First flight	Launches	Successes	Failures	Partial failures
Long March 4A	Retired	6 September 1988	2	0	0	0
Long March 4B	Active	10 May 1999	54	53	1	0
Long March 4C	Active	26 April 2006	58	56	2	0

== See also ==
- Long March 2 – Chinese family of rockets
- Long March 3 – Chinese orbital carrier rocket
