= YF-40 =

Chinese liquid rocket engine

YF-40B
- Country of origin: China
- First flight: 1995-06-01
- Designer: Academy of Aerospace Liquid Propulsion Technology
- Associated LV: Long March 1D, Long March 4
- Status: In Production

Liquid-fuel engine
- Propellant: N_{2}O_{4} / UDMH
- Mixture ratio: 2.14
- Cycle: Gas Generator

Configuration
- Chamber: 2
- Nozzle ratio: 55

Performance
- Thrust, vacuum: 103 kN (23,000 lbf)
- Chamber pressure: 4.6 MPa (670 psi)
- Specific impulse, vacuum: 303 seconds (2.97 km/s)
- Burn time: 412s
- Gimbal range: ±4.5°

Dimensions
- Length: 120 centimetres (47 in)
- Diameter: 63 centimetres (25 in)
- Dry mass: 83 kg (183 lb)

Used in
- Long March 1D second stage and Long March 4 third stage.

The YF-40 is a Chinese liquid rocket engine burning N_{2}O_{4} and UDMH in a gas generator cycle. It has dual gimbaling combustion chambers.

Originally it was developed for the Long March 1D second stage. It is used on the third stage of the Long March 4 family of launch vehicles.
