= FG-47 =

Chinese solid rocket motor

- Country of origin: China
- First flight: 1997-09-01
- Designer: China Hexi Chemical and Machinery Corporation
- Application: Kick engine
- Associated LV: Long March 2C CTS
- Status: In Production

Solid-fuel motor
- Propellant: AP / HTPB

Performance
- Thrust, vacuum: 9.8 kN (2,200 lbf)
- Specific impulse, vacuum: 288 s (2.82 km/s)
- Total impulse: 353 kN (79,000 lb_{f})
- Burn time: 36s

Dimensions
- Length: 852 mm (33.5 in)
- Diameter: 542 mm (21.3 in)

Used in
- CTS

The FG-47 (a.k.a. SpaB-54) is a Chinese solid rocket motor burning HTPB-based composite propellant. It was developed by China Hexi Chemical and Machinery Corporation (also known as the 6th Academy of CASIC) for use in the Long March 2C SD/CTS/SMA third stage. It had its inaugural flight on the Iridium-MFS demonstration mission on September 1, 1997.

It has a total nominal mass of 160 kg (350 lb), of which 125 kg (276 lb) is propellant load. It has an average thrust of 9.8 kN (2,200 lbf) with a specific impulse of 288 seconds burning for 35 seconds, with a total impulse of 353 kN (79,000 lb_{f}).

== See also ==
- CTS
- Long March 2C
- Iridium deployment
