= Tianhui (satellite) =

Tianhui (天绘) is a military Chinese series of Earth observation satellites.

== Satellites ==
Source
Type	Name	Launch date	Launcher	Launch site	Orbit	COSPAR ID	Payload	Notes
Tianhui 1	1-01	24 August 2010	Long March 2D	Juiquan	490 km inclination 97,9°	2010-040A	Optical, ground resolution of 5 m	
Tianhui 1	1-02	6 May 2012	Long March 2D	Juiquan	490 km inclination 97,9°	2012-020A	Optical, ground resolution of 5 m	
Tianhui 1	1-03	26 October 2015	Long March 2D	Juiquan	490 km inclination 97,9°	2015-061A	Optical, ground resolution of 5 m	
Tianhui 1	1-04	29 July 2021	Long March 2D	Juiquan	490 km inclination 97,9°	2021-067A	Optical, ground resolution of 5 m	
Tianhui 2	2-01A	29 April 2019	Long March 4B	Taiyuan	510 km inclination 97,4°	2019-024A	Radar, resolution of 3 m	
Tianhui 2	2-01B	29 April 2019	Long March 4B	Taiyuan	510 km inclination 97,4°	2019-024C	Radar, resolution of 3 m	
Tianhui 2	2-02A	18 August 2021	Long March 4B	Taiyuan	510 km inclination 97,4°	2021-074A	Radar, resolution of 3 m	
Tianhui 2	2-02B	18 August 2021	Long March 4B	Taiyuan	510 km inclination 97,4°	2021-074B	Radar, resolution of 3 m	
Tianhui 4	4A	29 December 2021	Long March 2D	Jiuquan		2021-134A		
Tianhui 4	4B	29 December 2021	Long March 2D	Jiuquan		2021-134B		
Tianhui 5	5A	31 October 2023	Long March 6A	Taiyuan		2023-168A		
Tianhui 5	5B	31 October 2023	Long March 6A	Taiyuan		2023-168C		
Tianhui 5	5C	4 July 2024	Long March 6A	Taiyuan		2024-126A		
Tianhui 5	5D	4 July 2024	Long March 6A	Taiyuan		2024-126B		
Tianhui 6	6A	9 March 2023	Long March 4C	Taiyuan		2023-030A		
Tianhui 6	6B	9 March 2023	Long March 4C	Taiyuan		2023-030D		
