= Long March 1 =

First member of China's Long March rocket family

Long March 1 Changzheng-1 (CZ-1)
- Function: Small-lift launch vehicle
- Manufacturer: China Academy of Space Technology; China Aerospace Science and Technology Corporation; Moscow Aviation Institute
- Country of origin: China

Size
- Height: 29.86 m (98.0 ft)
- Diameter: 2.25 m (7 ft 5 in)
- Mass: 81,570 kg (179,830 lb)
- Stages: 3

Capacity

Payload to Low Earth orbit
- Mass: 300 kg (660 lb)

Associated rockets
- Family: Long March

Launch history
- Status: Retired
- Launch sites: Jiuquan Satellite Launch Center
- Total launches: 2
- Success(es): 2
- First flight: 24 April 1970
- Last flight: 3 March 1971
- Carries passengers or cargo: Dong Fang Hong I

First stage
- Height: 17.835 m (58.51 ft)
- Diameter: 2.25 m (7 ft 5 in)
- Empty mass: 4,180 kg (9,220 lb)
- Gross mass: 65,250 kg (143,850 lb)
- Powered by: 1 YF-2A (4 x YF-1A)
- Maximum thrust: 1,101.2 kN (247,600 lb_{f}) (sea level); 1,214.4 kN (273,000 lb_{f}) (vacuum level)
- Specific impulse: 242.5 s (2.378 km/s) (sea level); 267.4 s (2.622 km/s) (vacuum level)
- Burn time: About 130 seconds
- Propellant: UDMH/AK27S

Second stage
- Height: 7.486 m (24.56 ft)
- Diameter: 2.25 m (7 ft 5 in)
- Empty mass: 2,340 kg (5,160 lb)
- Gross mass: 13,550 kg (29,870 lb)
- Powered by: YF-3A
- Maximum thrust: 320.2 kN (72,000 lb_{f})
- Specific impulse: 286.9 s (2.814 km/s)
- Burn time: About 126 seconds
- Propellant: UDMH/AK27S

Third stage – FG-02
- Height: 4.565 m (14.98 ft)
- Diameter: 0.77 m (2 ft 6 in)
- Empty mass: 400 kg (880 lb)
- Gross mass: 2,200 kg (4,900 lb)
- Powered by: FG-02
- Maximum thrust: 181 kN (41,000 lb_{f})
- Specific impulse: 254 s (2.49 km/s)
- Burn time: 38 seconds
- Propellant: Solid: Polysulfide/AP

The Long March 1 (长征一号, Chángzhēng yī hào, CZ-1, DoD: CSL-1), was the first member of China's Long March rocket family. Like the U.S.'s and the Soviet Union's first rockets, it was based on a class of ballistic missiles, namely the DF-3 class. Long March 1's first flight launched China's first satellite Dong Fang Hong 1 to space on 24 April 1970.

== History ==
Development started in January 1965 as the Seventh Ministry of Machine Building issued a design task. The two stage liquid fueled DF-4 was modified by adding a third stage in order to reach the desired orbit. Long March 1's first flight launched China's first satellite Dong Fang Hong 1 to space on 24 April 1970. The rocket was operational during 1970–1971. Wang Xiji was the chief designer of the rocket.

== Launch history ==
Launch (UTC)	Launch site	Payload	Orbit	Outcome	Notes
24 April 1970; 13:35	Jiuquan, LA-2A	Dong Fang Hong 1	MEO	Success	First satellite launched by China.
3 March 1971; 12:15	Jiuquan, LA-2A	Shijian 1	LEO	Success	

== See also ==
- DF-4 - ICBM on which this rocket is based
- Long March 1D - Other member of this rocket family
- YF-2A - Main propulsion module
- FG-02 - Upper stage
