= CTS (rocket stage) =

- Manufacturer: CALT
- Country of origin: China
- Used on: Long March 2C third stage

General characteristics
- Height: 0.9 m (35 in)
- Diameter: 0.54 m (21 in)
- Gross mass: 160 kg (350 lb)
- Propellant mass: 121.7 kg (268 lb)

Associated stages
- Derived from: SD
- Derivatives: SMA

Launch history
- Total launches: SD: 7 CTS: 2 SMA: 2
- Successes (stage only): SD: 7 CTS: 2 SMA: 2
- Failed: 0
- Lower stage failed: 0
- First flight: SD: 1997-09-01; CTS: 2003-12-29; SMA: 2008-09-06
- Last flight: SD: 1999-06-12; CTS: 2004-07-26; SMA: 2012-10-14

CTS
- Powered by: 1 FG-47 SRM; 16 thrusters
- Maximum thrust: 10.780 kN (2,423 lbf)
- Specific impulse: 286 seconds (2.80 km/s)
- Burn time: 35s
- Propellant: HTPB/AP (SRM) hydrazine (monopropellant thrusters)

The CTS is an upper stage developed by the China Academy of Launch Vehicle Technology (CALT) to improve the performance of the Long March 2C to high (>400 km of altitude) LEO missions like SSO. The two stage LM-2 delivers the payload and stage to an elliptical orbit with the desired apogee and the CTS points the stack in the direction of the correct vector and activates the solid rocket motor (SRM) main engine to circularize it. It then dispenses the spacecraft and does a passivisation procedure.

== History ==
It was initially developed as the SD stage for the initial deployment of the Iridium constellation in 1997. In 1999, LM-2C User Manual was offered as the CTS option and flew to deploy the Double Star mission. Later, it flew twice as part of the dual deployment system SMA, first for the deployment of the Huanjing 1A and 1B and in 2012 for the Shijian 9A and Shijian 9A technology demonstrator missions.

Date	Carrier rocket	Designation	Launch site	Mission	Result
1997-09-01	Long March 2C	SD	Taiyuan	Iridium-MFS 1 / Iridium-MFS 2	Success
1997-12-08	Long March 2C	SD	Taiyuan	Iridium 42 / Iridium 44	Success
1998-03-25	Long March 2C	SD	Taiyuan	Iridium 51 / Iridium 61	Success
1998-05-02	Long March 2C	SD	Taiyuan	Iridium 69 / Iridium 71	Success
1998-08-19	Long March 2C	SD	Taiyuan	Iridium 76 / Iridium 78	Success
1998-12-19	Long March 2C	SD	Taiyuan	Iridium 88 / Iridium 89	Success
1999-06-10	Long March 2C	SD	Taiyuan	Iridium 92 / Iridium 93	Success
2003-12-29	Long March 2C	CTS	Xichang	Double Star Equatorial (TC 1)	Success
2004-07-26	Long March 2C	CTS	Taiyuan	Double Star Polar (TC 2)	Success
2008-09-06	Long March 2C	SMA	Taiyuan	Huanjing 1A / Huanjing 1B	Success
2012-10-14	Long March 2C	SMA	Taiyuan	Shijian 9A / Shijian 9A	Success

== Design ==
It is composed of the Spacecraft Adapter and Orbital Maneuver System (OMS). The Spacecraft Adapter is customized to the user's requirement, particularly in the separation environment and pointing accuracy. The OMS is composed by:

- Main structure
- Control system (avionics)
- Telemetry system
- Solid rocket motor (SRM)
- Reaction control system (RCS)

== Versions ==
The basic system has been offered in three different versions:

- SD: Initial version used exclusively for the Iridium fleet deployment.
- CTS: Improved commercial version offered in the 1999 User Manual with 3 axis stabilization.
- SMA: Government version which includes a dual payload adapter.

== See also ==
- Long March 2C
- CALT
- Star 37
- Star 48
- Payload Assist Module
