= Tianhui 1B =

Chinese Earth observation satellite

Tianhui I-02
- Tianhui I-02
- Mission type: Earth observation
- Operator: CASC
- COSPAR ID: 2012-020A
- SATCAT no.: 38256

Start of mission
- Launch date: 6 May 2012, 07:10:05 UTC
- Rocket: Chang Zheng 2D
- Launch site: Jiuquan LA-4/SLS-2

Orbital parameters
- Reference system: Geocentric
- Regime: Low Earth
- Perigee altitude: 492 kilometres (306 mi)
- Apogee altitude: 504 kilometres (313 mi)
- Inclination: 97.35 degrees
- Period: 94.57 minutes
- Epoch: 6 May 2012

Tian Hui-1 (also known as Mapping Satellite I) is a Chinese Earth observation satellite built by Dong Feng Hong, a China Aerospace Science and Technology Corporation (CASC). Tian Hui-1 was launched on 6 May 2012 at 9:10 UTC on a Long March 2D rocket into a Sun-synchronous, polar orbit with an perigee of 490 km (300 mi) and apogee of 505 km (314 mi).

According to the Chinese Ministry of Defense the new satellite carries scientific experiments and is to be used for the evaluation of ground resources and mapping.

Tian Hui 1 is equipped with two different camera systems in the visible and infrared range. The visible light camera is able to produce three-dimensional pictures in the spectral region between 510 and 690 nanometers with a dissolution of approximately 5 meters and a field of view of approximately 25 degrees. The infrared camera reaches a dissolution of approximately 10 meters and covers four wavelengths (430 - 520 Nm, 520 - 610 Nm, 610 - 690 Nm and 760 - 900 Nm).

== See also ==
- Tianhui (satellite)
