= Long March (rocket family) =

Class of Chinese rockets

Long March family
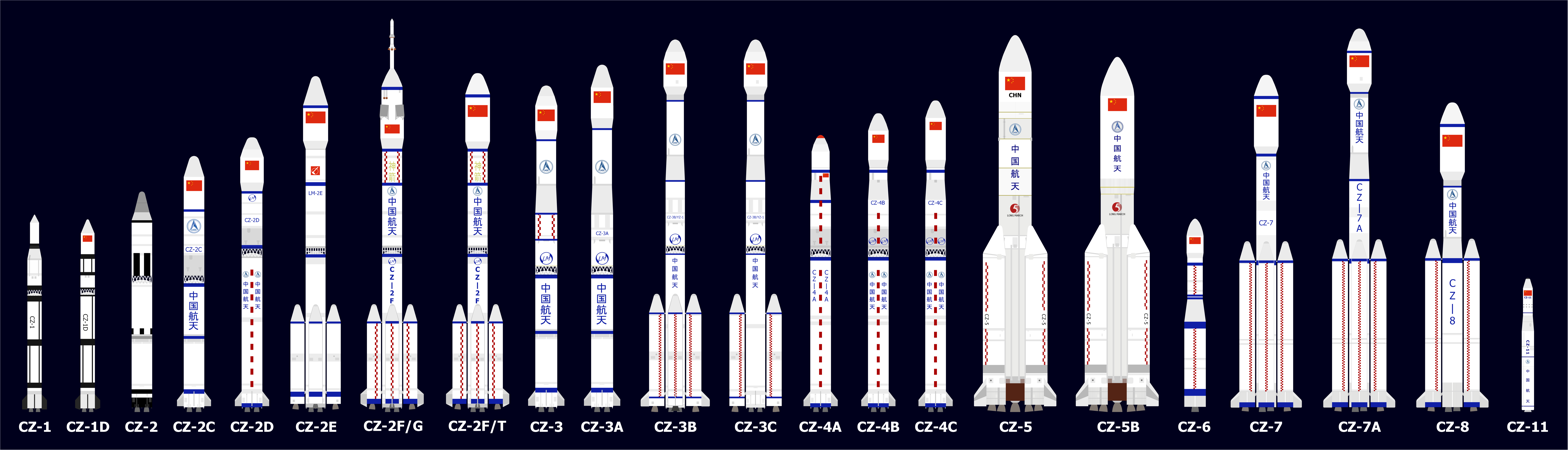
- Comparative diagram of Long March rockets by 2021

General information
- Other name: 长征运载火箭 (Cháng Zhēng yùnzài huǒjiàn)
- Type: Expendable and reusable launch system with various applications
- National origin: China
- Manufacturer: China Aerospace Science and Technology Corporation
- Status: 10+ variants active
- Primary user: China Aerospace Science and Technology Corporation; China National Space Administration; China Manned Space Agency

History
- Manufactured: 1970–2020s (decade)
- Introduction date: 1970
- First flight: April 24, 1970; 56 years ago
- Developed from: Dongfeng missile series
- Variants: Long March 1; Long March 2; Long March 3; Long March 4; Long March 5; Long March 6; Long March 7; Long March 8; Long March 9; Long March 10; Long March 11; Long March 12

The Long March rocket family (Chinese: 长征运载火箭, romanized: Cháng Zhēng yùnzài huǒjiàn, lit. 'Long March launch vehicles') is a family of expendable and reusable carrier rockets operated by the China Aerospace Science and Technology Corporation. The rockets are named after the Chinese Red Army's 1934–35 Long March military retreat during the Chinese Civil War.

The Long March series has performed more than 600 launches, the third most among active rocket families, to low Earth orbit, Sun-synchronous orbit, geostationary transfer orbit, trans-lunar, and trans-Mars injection. The Long March 2F is a human-rated vehicle which launches the Shenzhou craft. The Long March 5 has the greatest payload, at 25,000 kilograms to low Earth orbit, placing it in the heavy-lift launch vehicle class. It has launched the Tianwen-1 Mars probe and the Chang'e 6 and Chang'e 5 Moon probes. The Long March 10 is undergoing development and component testing as a launch vehicle for the Mengzhou and Lanyue crewed lunar vehicles.

The new-generation carrier rockets, Long March 5, 6, 7, 8, and 10 use a liquid oxygen with a liquid hydrogen or kerosene fuel, while the older Long March 2, 3, and 4 use the hypergolic mixture of unsymmetrical dimethylhydrazine and dinitrogen tetroxide.

The early rockets in the family were derived from China's Dongfeng program of nuclear-capable ballistic missiles. From 1988 to 1998, Long March rockets launched US commercial satellites, however failures carrying Apstar 2 and Intelsat 708 caused controversy in the US, resulting in such launches being prohibited under the US International Traffic in Arms Regulations.

Long March rockets typically launch commercial satellites from Xichang and Wenchang launch sites, military-related satellites and crewed craft from Jiuquan Satellite Launch Center, and Sun-synchronous satellties from Taiyuan Satellite Launch Center.

== History ==
China used the Long March 1 rocket to launch its first satellite, Dong Fang Hong 1 (lit. "The East is Red 1"), into low Earth orbit on 24 April 1970, becoming the fifth nation to achieve independent launch capability. Early launches had an inconsistent record, focusing on the launching of Chinese satellites. The Long March 1 was quickly replaced by the Long March 2 family of launchers.

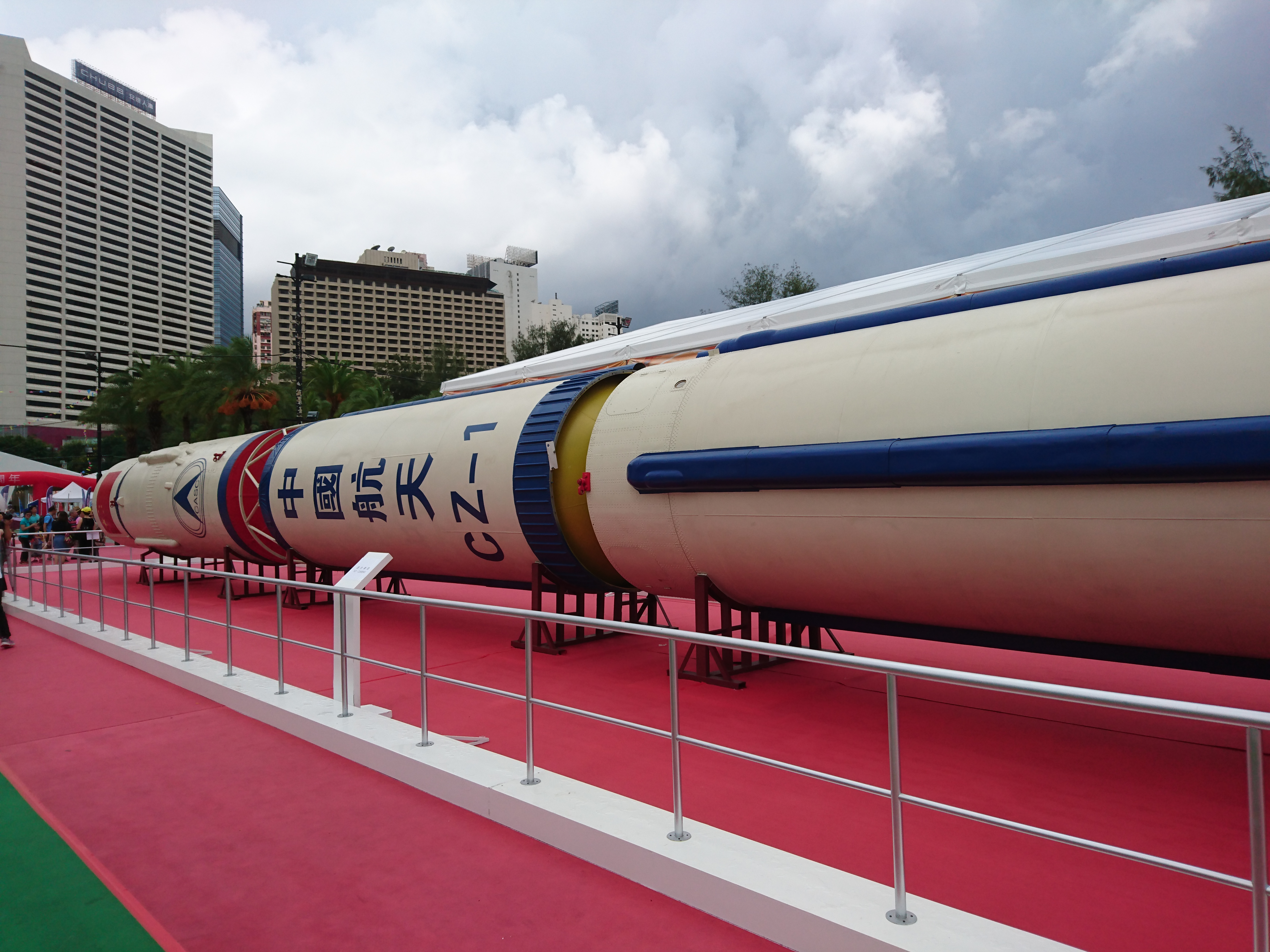
Long March 1

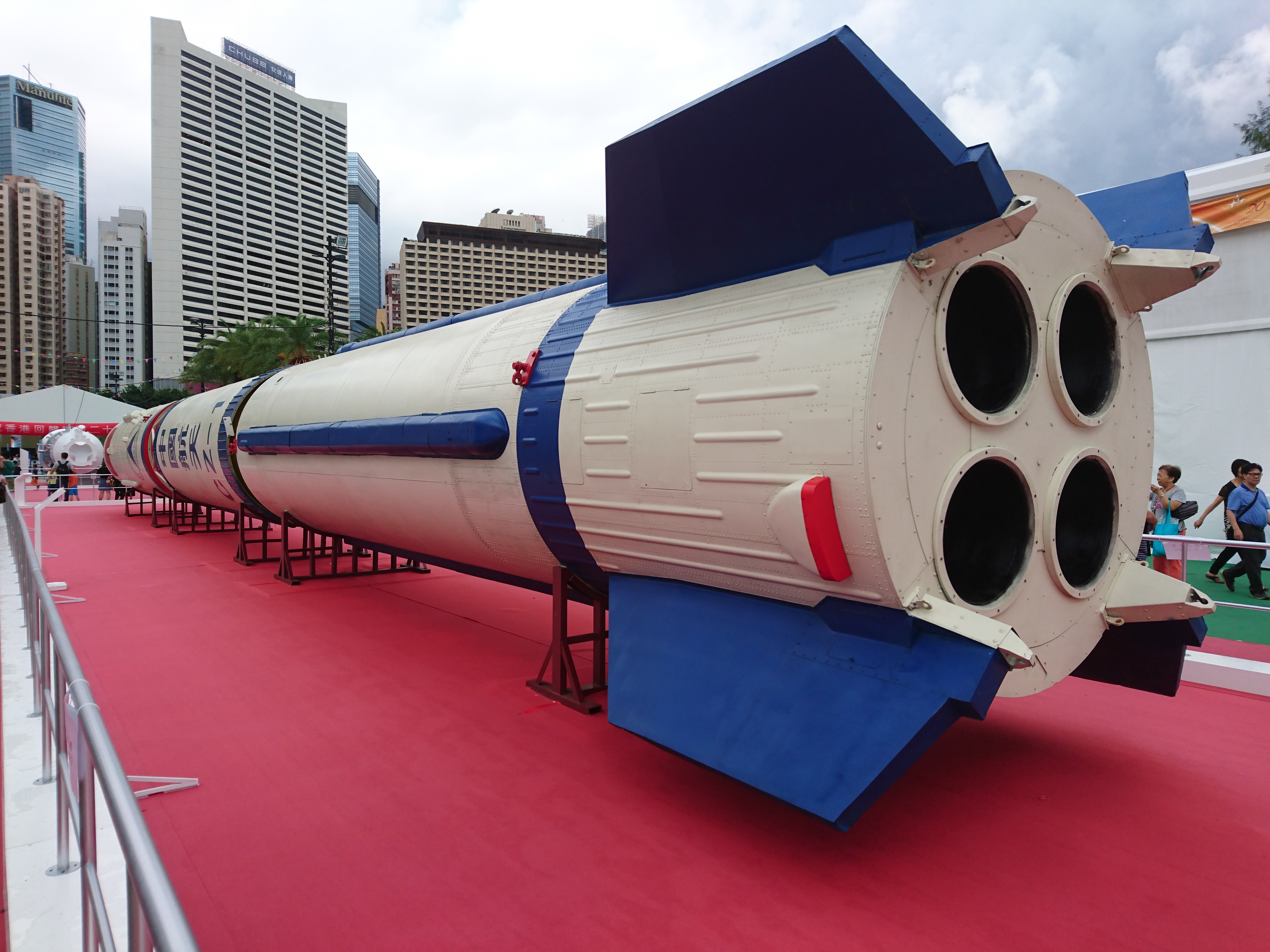
Long March 1 engine

=== Origins ===
The Long March 1 rocket is derived from earlier Chinese 2-stage Intermediate-range ballistic missile (IRBM) DF-4, or Dong Feng 4 missile, and the Long March 2, Long March 3, Long March 4 rocket families are derivatives of the Chinese 2-stage Intercontinental ballistic missile (ICBM) DF-5, or Dong Feng 5 missile.

However, like its counterparts in both the United States and in Russia, the differing needs of space rockets and strategic missiles have caused the development of space rockets and missiles to diverge. The main goal of a launch vehicle is to maximize payload, while for strategic missiles increased throw weight is much less important than the ability to launch quickly and to survive a first strike. This divergence has become clear in the next generation of Long March rockets, which use cryogenic propellants in sharp contrast to the next generation of strategic missiles, which are mobile and solid fuelled.

The next generation of Long March rocket, Long March 5 rocket family, is a brand new design, while Long March 6 and Long March 7 can be seen as derivations because they use the liquid rocket booster design of Long March 5 to build small-to-mid capacity launch vehicles.

=== Entry into commercial launch market ===
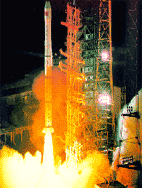
Long March 3A launch

After the U.S. Space Shuttle Challenger was destroyed in 1986, a growing commercial backlog gave China the chance to enter the international launch market. In September 1988, U.S. President Ronald Reagan agreed to allow U.S. satellites to be launched on Chinese rockets. Reagan's satellite export policy would continue to 1998, through Bush and Clinton administrations, with 20 or more approvals. AsiaSat 1, which had originally been launched by the Space Shuttle and retrieved by another Space Shuttle after a failure, was launched by a Long March 3 in 1990 as the first foreign payload on a Chinese rocket.

However, major setbacks occurred in 1992–1996. The Long March 2E was designed with a defective payload fairing, which collapsed when faced with the rocket's excessive vibration. After just seven launches, the Long March 2E destroyed the Optus B2 and Apstar 2 satellites and damaged AsiaSat 2. The Long March 3B also experienced a catastrophic failure in 1996, veering off course shortly after liftoff and crashing into a nearby village. At least 6 people were killed on the ground, and the Intelsat 708 satellite was also destroyed. A Long March 3 also experienced a partial failure in August 1996 during the launch of Chinasat-7. Six Long March rockets (Chang Zheng 2C/SD) launched 12 Iridium satellites, about a sixth of Iridium satellites in the original fleet.

=== United States embargo on Chinese launches ===
The involvement of United States companies in the Apstar 2 and Intelsat 708 investigations caused great controversy in the United States. In the Cox Report, the United States Congress accused Space Systems/Loral and Hughes Aircraft Company of transferring information that would improve the design of Chinese rockets and ballistic missiles. Although the Long March was allowed to launch its commercial backlog, the United States Department of State has not approved any satellite export licenses to China since 1998. ChinaSat 8, which had been scheduled for launch in April 1999 on a Long March 3B rocket, was placed in storage, sold to the Singapore company ProtoStar, and finally launched on a European rocket Ariane 5 in 2008.

From 2005 to 2012, Long March rockets launched ITAR-free satellites made by the European company Thales Alenia Space. However, Thales Alenia was forced to discontinue its ITAR-free satellite line in 2013 after the United States State Department fined a United States company for selling ITAR components. Thales Alenia Space had long complained that "every satellite nut and bolt" was being ITAR-restricted, and the European Space Agency (ESA) accused the United States of using ITAR to block exports to China instead of protecting technology. In 2016, an official at the United States Bureau of Industry and Security confirmed that "no U.S.-origin content, regardless of significance, regardless of whether it is incorporated into a foreign-made item, can go to China". Since 2016, the European aerospace industry is working on developing replacements for United States satellite components.

=== Return to success ===
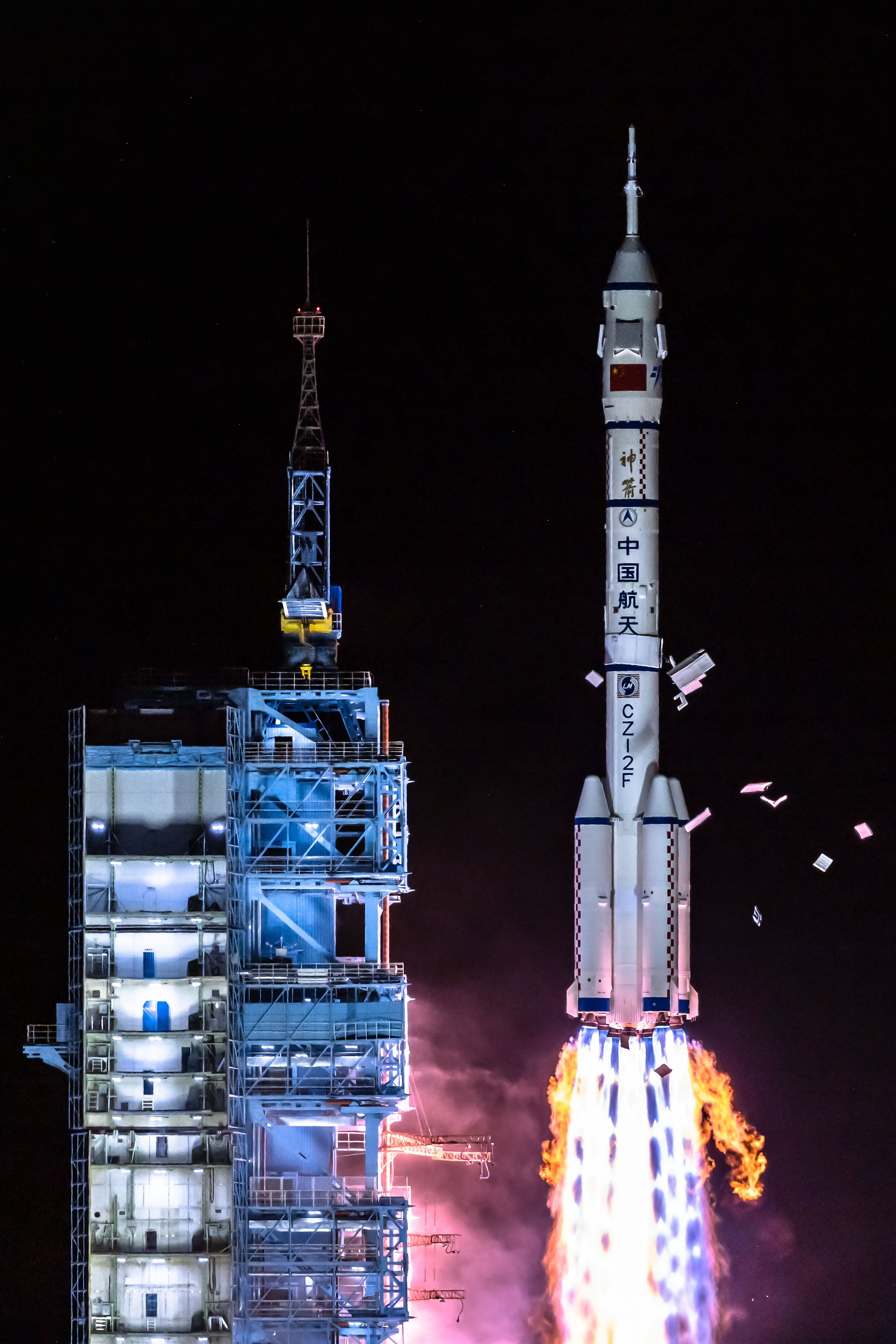
Long March 2F is the only human-rated launch vehicle of the Long March family.

After the failures of 1992–1996, the troublesome Long March 2E was withdrawn from the market. Design changes were made to improve the reliability of Long March rockets. From October 1996 to April 2009, the Long March rocket family delivered 75 consecutive successful launches, including several major milestones in space flight:

- On 15 October 2003, the Long March 2F rocket successfully launched the Shenzhou 5 spacecraft, carrying China's first astronaut into space. China became the third nation with independent human spaceflight capability, after the Soviet Union/Russia and the United States.
- On 1 June 2007, Long March rockets completed their 100th launch overall.
- On 24 October 2007, the Long March 3A successfully launched (10:05 UTC) the "Chang'e 1" lunar orbiting spacecraft from the Xichang Satellite Launch Center.

The Long March rockets have subsequently maintained an excellent reliability record. Since 2010, Long March launches have made up 15–25% of all space launches globally. Growing domestic demand has maintained a healthy manifest. International deals have been secured through a package deal that bundles the launch with a Chinese satellite, circumventing the United States embargo.

== Payloads ==
The Long March is China's primary expendable launch system family. The Shenzhou spacecraft and Chang'e lunar orbiters are also launched on the Long March rocket. The maximum payload for LEO is 25,000 kilograms (CZ-5B), the maximum payload for GTO is 14,000 kg (CZ-5). The next generation rocket Long March 5 variants will offer more payload in the future.

== Propellants ==
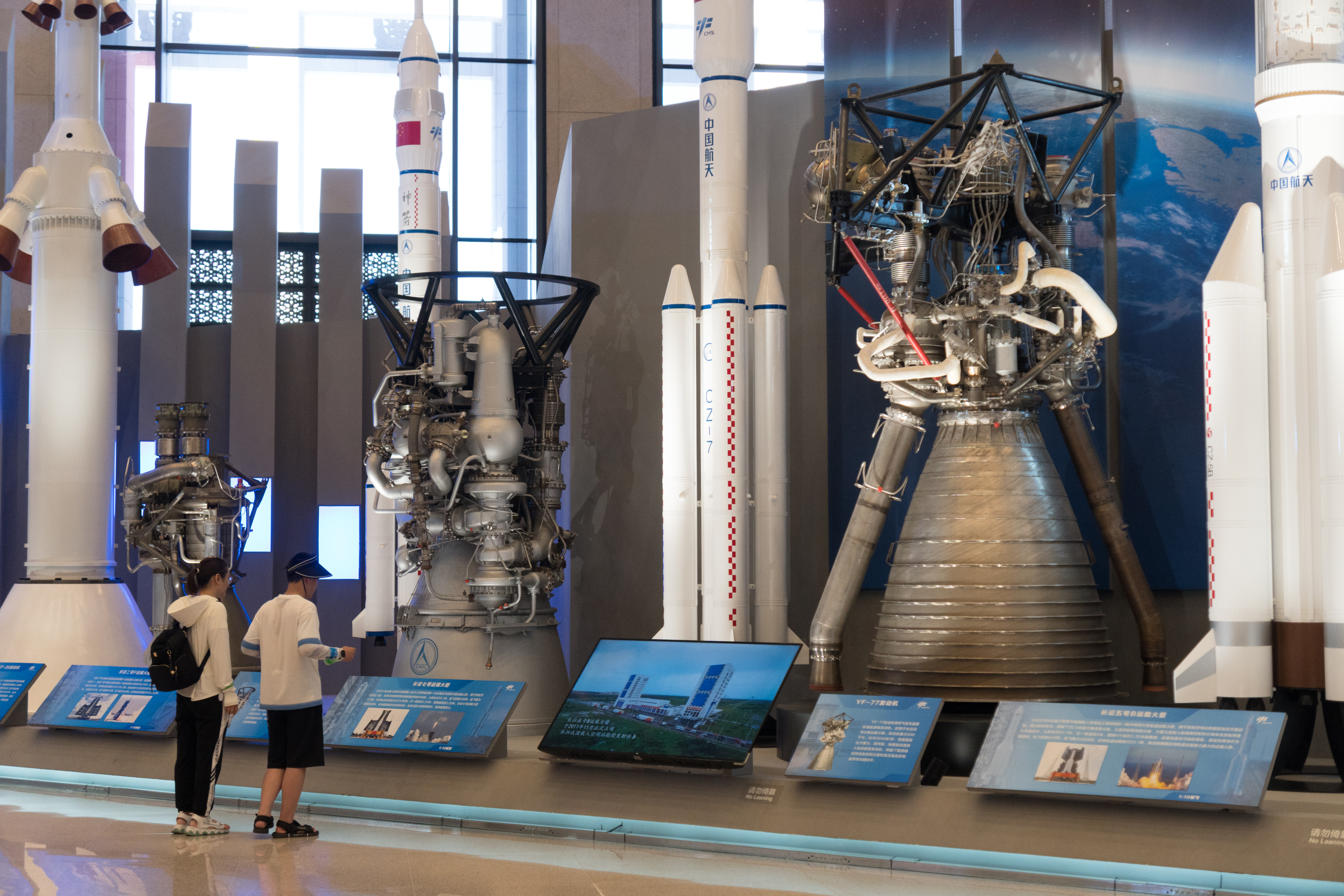
Three engines using three different combination of propellants. From left to right: YF-20 using N_{2}O_{4} and UDMH, YF-100 using LOX and kerosene, YF-77 using LOX and LH_{2}

Long March 1's 1st and 2nd stage used nitric acid and unsymmetrical dimethylhydrazine (UDMH) propellants, and its upper stage used a spin-stabilized solid rocket engine.

Long March 2, Long March 3, Long March 4, the main stages and associated liquid rocket boosters use dinitrogen tetroxide (N_{2}O_{4}) as the oxidizing agent and UDMH as the fuel. The upper stages (third stage) of Long March 3 rockets use YF-73 and YF-75 engines, using liquid hydrogen (LH_{2}) as the fuel and liquid oxygen (LOX) as the oxidizer.

The new generation of Long March rocket family, Long March 5 and its derivations Long March 6, Long March 7, Long March 8, and Long March 10 use non-toxic LOX/kerosene and LOX/LH_{2} liquid propellants (except in some upper stages where UDMH/N_{2}O_{4} continues to be used).

Long March 9 is being developed as a LOX/CH_{4}, or methalox, rocket.

Long March 11 is a solid-fuel rocket.

Long March 12 uses non-toxic LOX/kerosene liquid propellants for the first 2 stages.

== Members ==
Timeline bars start at first launch (rather than start of development).

The Long March rockets are organized into several series:

- Long March 1
- Long March 2
- Long March 3
- Long March 4
- Long March 5
- Long March 6
- Long March 7
- Long March 8
- Long March 9
- Long March 10
- Long March 11
- Long March 12

The Long March 5, 6 and 7 are a newer generation of rockets sharing the new 1200 kN class YF-100 engines, which burns RP-1 / LOX, unlike earlier 2, 3 and 4 series which uses more expensive and dangerous N_{2}O_{4} / UDMH propellants. The 5 series is a heavy-lift launch vehicle, with a capacity of 25,000 kg to LEO, while the 6 series is a small-lift launch vehicle with a capacity of 1,500 kg to LEO, and the 7 series is a medium-lift launch vehicle, with a capacity of 14,000 kg to LEO.

The Long March 10 and 12 series use the uprated YF-100K engines.

The Long March 10A is a partially-reusable crewed-rated rocket designed for LEO missions currently under development; the Long March 9 is initially designed to be partially reusable before becoming a fully reusable launcher.

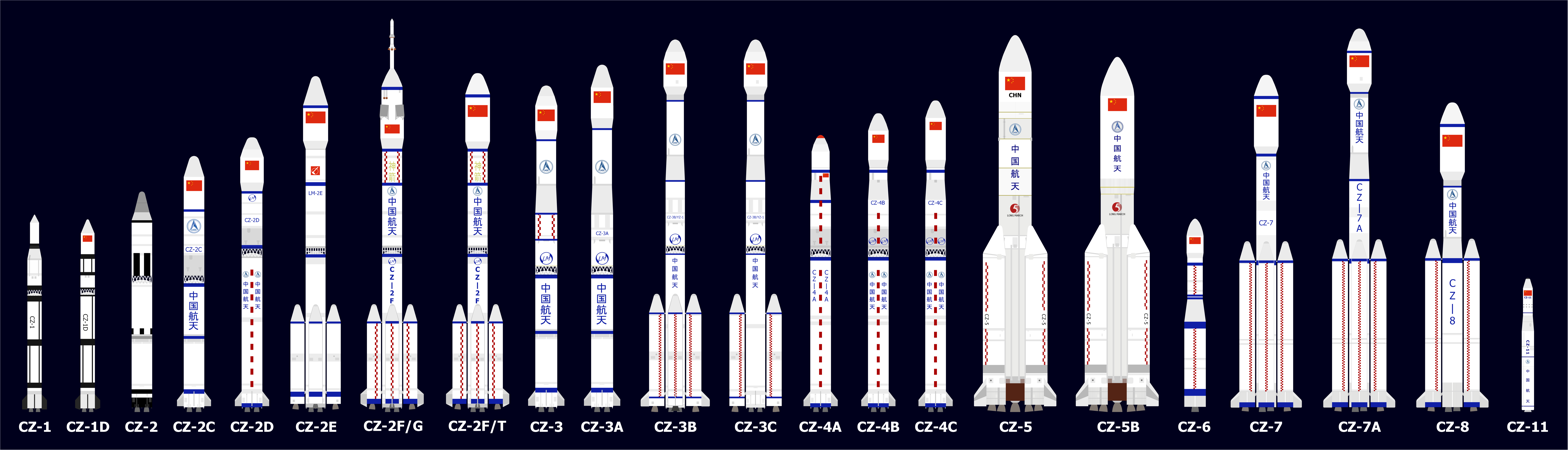
Comparison of Long March rockets

Model	Status	Stages	Length (m)	Max. diameter (m)	Liftoff mass (t)	Liftoff thrust (kN)	Payload (LEO, kg)	Payload (SSO, kg)	Payload (GTO, kg)
Long March 1	Retired	3	29.86	2.25	81.6	1020	300	–	–
Long March 1D	Retired	3	28.22	2.25	81.1	1101.2	930	–	–
Long March 2A	Retired	2	31.17	3.35	190	2,786	1,800	–	–
Long March 2C	Active	2	43.72	3.35	245	2,961.6	4,000	2,100	1,250
Long March 2D	Active	2	41.056 (without shield)	3.35	249.6	2,961.6	3,500	1,300	–
Long March 2E	Retired	2 (+ 4 boosters)	49.686	3.35	464	5,923.2	9,500	4,350	3,500
Long March 2F	Retired	2 (+ 4 boosters)	58.34	3.35	493	6512	8,800	–	–
Long March 2F/G	Active	2 (+ 4 boosters)	58.34	3.35	493	6512	8,800	–	–
Long March 2F/T	Active	2 (+ 4 boosters)	58.34	3.35	493	6512	8,800	–	–
Long March 3	Retired	3	44.9	3.35	205	2,961.6	5,000	–	1,600
Long March 3A	Retired	3	52.52	3.35	242	2,961.6	6,000	5,100	2,600
Long March 3B	Retired (Note: CZ-3B last flown in September 2012 on flight 22 of the combined CZ-3B and CZ-3B/E launch list; subsequent 43 flights in said list (to February 2020) have all been of the CZ-3B/E variant.)	3 (+ 4 boosters)	54.838	7.85 (including boosters)	425.8	5,923.2	11,200	6,850	5,100
Long March 3B/E	Active	3 (+ 4 boosters)	56.326	7.85 (including boosters)	458.97	5923.2	11,500	7,100	5,500
Long March 3C	Retired	3 (+ 2 boosters)	55.638	7.85 (including boosters)	345	4,442.4	9,100	6,450	3,900
Long March 3C/E	Active	3 (+ 2 boosters)	55.638	7.85 (including boosters)	345	4,442.4	9,100	6,450	3,900
Long March 4A	Retired	3	41.9	3.35	241.1	2,961.6	3,800	1,600	–
Long March 4B	Active	3	48	3.35	249.2	2,961.6	4,200	2,295	–
Long March 4C	Active	3	48	3.35	249.2	2,961.6	4,200	2,947	1,500
Long March 5	Active	2 (+ 4 boosters, optional upper stage)	57	11.7 (including boosters)	854.5	10620	–	–	14,400
Long March 5B	Active	1 (+ 4 boosters)	53.7	11.7 (including boosters)	837.5	10620	25,000	15,000	–
Long March 6	Active	3	29	3.35	103	1200	>1,500	500~1,080	–
Long March 6A	Active	2 (+ 4 solid fuel boosters)	50~55	7.35 (including boosters)	530	7230	>8,000	>5,000	–
Long March 6C	Active	2	43	3.35	217	2,376	4,500	2,000	1,400
Long March 7	Active	2 (+ 4 boosters)	53	7.85 (including boosters)	597	7,200	14,000	5,500	–
Long March 7A	Active	3 (+ 4 boosters)	60.13–60.7	7.85 (including boosters)	573	7,200	–	–	7,800
Long March 8	Active	2 (2 boosters, optional)	50.3	3–7.85 (including boosters)	356.6	4,800	8,100	5,000	2,800
Long March 8A	Active	2 (+ 2 boosters)	50.5	3.35–7.85 (including boosters)	371	4,800	9,800	7,000	3,500
Long March 9	Planned	3	114	10.6	4,369	60,000	150,000	–	–
Long March 10	Planned	3 (+ 2 common core boosters)	88.5–91.6	15 (including boosters)	2,187	26,250	70,000	–	32,000
Long March 10A	Planned	2	88.5–91.6	5	?	8,750	>18,000 expened >14,000 reusable	–	-
Long March 10B	Active	2	70.2	5	?	8,750	16,000 reusable	–	–
Long March 10C	Planned	2	~91	5	~940	~12,350	27,000 expened 22,000 reusable	–	–
Long March 11	Active	4	20.8	~2	58	1,188	700	350	–
Long March 12	Active	2	62	3.8	433	5,000	12,000	6,000	–
Long March 12A	Active	2	69	3.8	430	5,495	12,000 expened 9,000 reusable	5,000	–
Long March 12B	Active	2	72	4.37	437	7,515	20,000 expened 12,000 reusable	12,000	–

2A	2C	2D	2E	2F	3	3A	3B	3C	4A	4B	4C

=== Long March 8 ===
The Long March 8 is a new series of launch vehicles, which is geared towards Sun-synchronous orbit (SSO) launches. In early 2017, it was expected to be based on the Long March 7, and have two solid fuel boosters, and first launch by the end of 2018. By 2019, it was intended to be partially reusable. The first stage will have legs and grid fins (like Falcon 9) and it may land with side boosters still attached. The first Long March 8 was rolled out to for a test launch on or around 20 December 2020 and launched on 22 December 2020. The second flight with no side boosters occurred on 27 February 2022, sending a national record of 22 satellites into SSO.

=== Future development ===
==== Long March 9 ====
The Long March 9 (LM-9, CZ-9, or Changzheng 9, Chinese: 长征九号) is a Chinese super-heavy carrier rocket concept proposed in 2018 that is currently in study. It is planned for a maximum payload capacity of 140,000 kg to low Earth orbit (LEO), 50,000 kg to trans-lunar injection or 44,000 kg to Mars. Its first flight is expected by 2028 or 2029 in preparation for a lunar landing sometime in the 2030s; a sample return mission from Mars has been proposed as first major mission. It has been stated that around 70% of the hardware and components needed for a test flight are currently undergoing testing, with the first engine test to occur by the end of 2018. The 2011 proposed design would be a three-staged rocket, with the initial core having a diameter of 10 meters and use a cluster of four engines. Multiple variants of the rocket have been proposed, CZ-9 being the largest with four liquid-fuel boosters with the aforementioned LEO payload capacity of 140,000 kg, CZ-9A having just two boosters and a LEO payload capacity of 100,000 kg, and finally CZ-9B having just the core stage and a LEO payload capacity of 50,000 kg.

===== 2021 respecification =====
Approved in 2021, the Long March 9 is classified as a super heavy-lift launch vehicle. A very different design of LM-9 was announced in June 2021, with more engines and no external boosters. Payload capacities are 160 tonnes to LEO and 53 tonnes to TLI.

==== Long March 10 ====
The Long March 10, previously known as the "921 rocket", is under development for crewed lunar missions. The nickname "921" refers to the founding date of China's human spaceflight program. Like the Long March 5, it uses 5-meter (16.4 ft) diameter rocket bodies and YF-100K engines, although with 7 engines on each of 3 cores. The launch weight is 2187 tonnes, delivering 25 tonnes into trans-lunar injection. The proposed crewed lunar mission uses two rockets; the crewed spacecraft and lunar landing stack launch separately and rendezvous in lunar orbit. Development was announced at the 2020 China Space Conference. As of 2022, the first flight of this triple-cored rocket is targeted for 2027.

== Launch sites ==
There are four launch centers in China. They are:

- Jiuquan Satellite Launch Center
- Taiyuan Satellite Launch Center
- Wenchang Spacecraft Launch Site
- Xichang Satellite Launch Center

Most of the commercial satellite launches of Long March vehicles have been from Xichang Satellite Launch Center, located in Xichang, Sichuan province. Wenchang Spacecraft Launch Site in Hainan province is under expansion and will be the main launch center for future commercial satellite launches. Long March launches also take place from the more military oriented Jiuquan Satellite Launch Center in Gansu province from which the crewed Shenzhou spacecraft also launches. Taiyuan Satellite Launch Center is located in Shanxi province and focuses on the launches of Sun-synchronous orbit (SSO) satellites.

On 5 June 2019, China launched a Long March 11 rocket from a mobile launch platform in the Yellow Sea.

== Commercial launch services ==
China markets launch services under the China Aerospace Science and Technology Corporation (China Great Wall Industry Corporation). Its efforts to launch communications satellites were dealt a blow in the mid-1990s after the United States stopped issuing export licenses to companies to allow them to launch on Chinese launch vehicles out of fear that this would help China's military. In the face of this, Thales Alenia Space built the Chinasat-6B satellite with no components from the United States whatsoever. This allowed it to be launched on a Chinese launch vehicle without violating United States International Traffic in Arms Regulations (ITAR) restrictions. The launch, on a Long March 3B rocket, was successfully conducted on 5 July 2007.

A Chinese Long March 2D launched VRSS-1 (Venezuelan Remote Sensing Satellite-1) of Venezuela, "Francisco de Miranda" on 29 September 2012.

== See also ==
- China National Space Administration
- Shenzhou spacecraft – Class of crewed spacecraft from China
- Space program of China
- Tsien Hsue-shen – Chinese rocket scientist (1911–2009)
- Comparison of orbital launchers families
- Comparison of orbital launch systems
- Kaituozhe launcher – Chinese solid fueled launch vehicle based on the road mobile DF-21 IRBM
- Kuaizhou launcher – Family of Chinese "quick-reaction" orbital launch vehicles
