= Long March 4A =

Chinese orbital carrier rocket

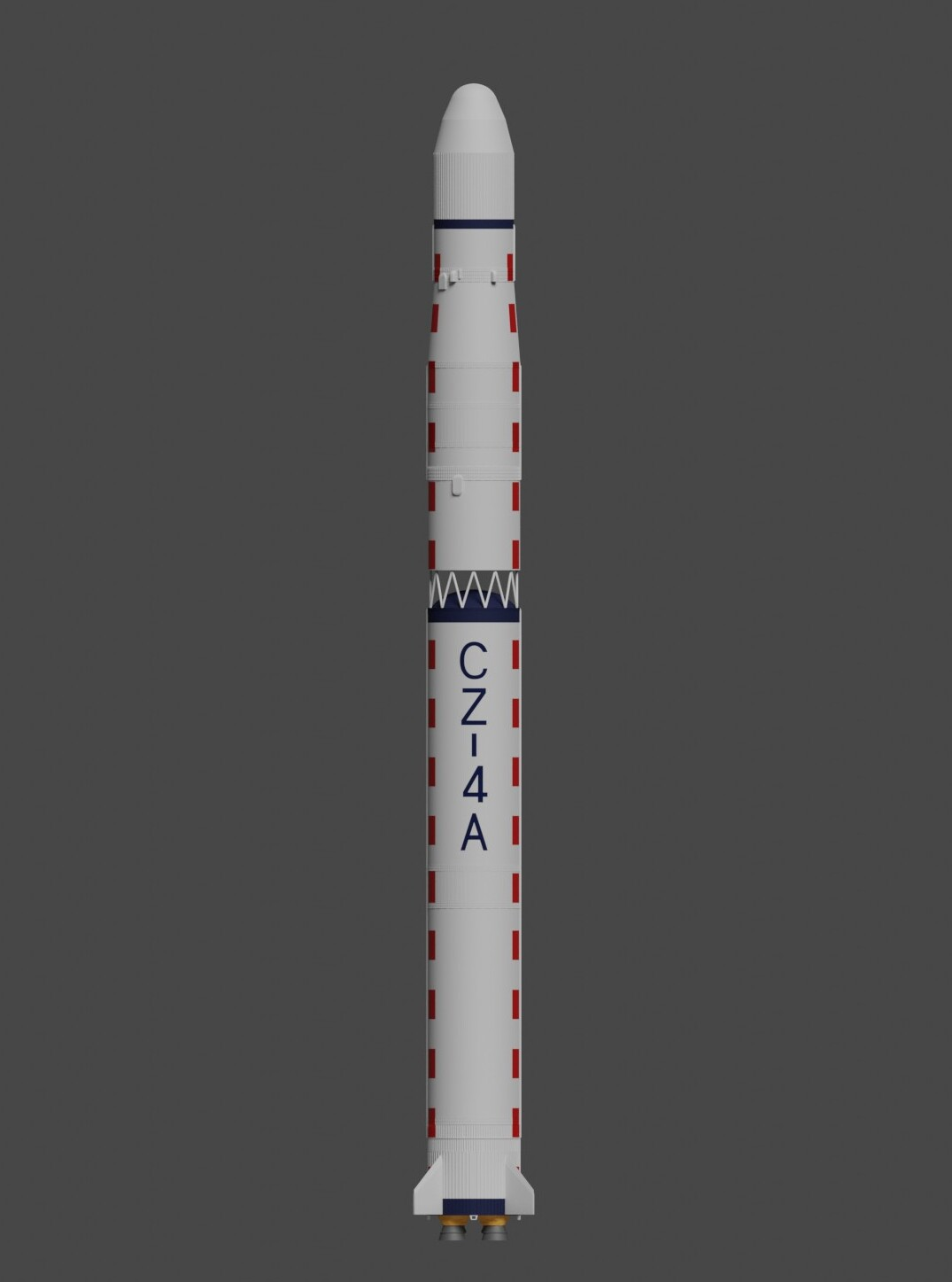
- Rendering of Long March 4A
- Function: Medium-lift launch vehicle
- Manufacturer: China Academy of Launch Vehicle Technology
- Country of origin: China

Size
- Height: 41.9 metres (137 ft)
- Diameter: 3.35 metres (11.0 ft)
- Mass: 249,000 kilograms (549,000 lb)
- Stages: 3

Capacity

Payload to LEO
- Mass: 4,000 kilograms (8,800 lb)

Payload to SSO
- Mass: 1,500 kilograms (3,300 lb)

Associated rockets
- Family: Long March
- Derivative work: Long March 4B

Launch history
- Status: Retired
- Launch sites: LA-7, TSLC
- Total launches: 2
- Success(es): 2
- First flight: 6 September 1988
- Last flight: 3 September 1990

The Long March 4A (Chinese: 长征四号甲火箭), also known as the Changzheng 4A, CZ-4A and LM-4A, sometimes misidentified as the Long March 4 due to the lack of any such designated rocket, was a Chinese orbital carrier rocket. It was launched from Launch Area 7 at the Taiyuan Satellite Launch Center. It was a three-stage rocket, used for two launches in 1988 and 1990. On its maiden flight, on 6 September 1988, it placed the FY-1A weather satellite into orbit. On its second, and final, flight it launched another weather satellite, FY-1B.

A month after the launch of FY-1B, the third-stage of the CZ-4A launch vehicle exploded in a 895 x 880 km orbit, creating more than 100 pieces of space debris. This incident led to a redesign of the rocket to include a residual propellant venting system. A venting system was not included in the 4A because of the concern that it would damage the satellite. It was replaced by a derivative, the Long March 4B, which first flew in 1999. The Long March 4B offers a more powerful third stage, and a larger payload fairing.

== History ==
Both Long March 4A flights carried experimental Fengyun-1 weather satellites, China's first polar-orbiting meteorological satellites, which were built by the Shanghai Academy of Spaceflight Technology and operated by the China Meteorological Administration. FY-1A, which weighed 750 kg, was launched on 6 September 1988 UTC (7 September local time), and the 880 kg FY-1B followed on 3 September 1990 together with two QQW balloon satellites. Both spacecraft were three-axis stabilized, using nitrogen cold-gas thrusters and reaction wheels for attitude control, with gyros and horizon sensors to determine attitude. Two solar arrays about 3.5 m long each provided a combined 800 W. The Long March 4A placed them in orbits of roughly 900 km altitude with an inclination of about 99°.

== List of launches ==
Flight No.	Date (UTC)	Launch site	Payload	Orbit	Result
1	September 6, 1988; 20:30	LA-7, TSLC	Fengyun 1A	SSO	Success
2	September 3, 1990; 00:53	LA-7, TSLC	Fengyun 1B	SSO	Success
