= Dong Fang Hong 1 =

First satellite launched by China in 1970

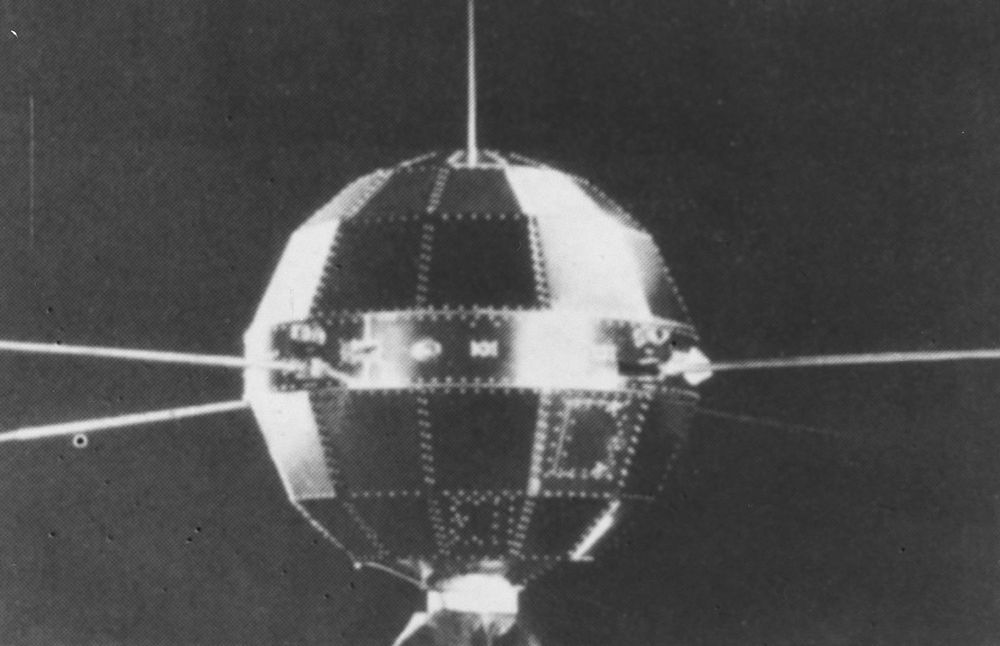
- DFH-1 satellite
- Names: The East is Red 1 China 1 PRC 1
- Mission type: Technology demonstration
- Operator: CAST
- COSPAR ID: 1970-034A
- SATCAT no.: 04382
- Mission duration: 19 days (achieved); 56 years, 1 month and 27 days (in orbit)

Spacecraft properties
- Manufacturer: CASC
- Launch mass: 173 kg (381 lb)
- Dimensions: 1 m (3 ft 3 in) of diameter

Start of mission
- Launch date: 24 April 1970, 13:35:45 GMT
- Rocket: Chang Zheng 1
- Launch site: Jiuquan, LA-5020
- Contractor: China Academy of Launch Vehicle Technology
- Entered service: 24 April 1970

End of mission
- Last contact: 14 May 1970

Orbital parameters
- Reference system: Geocentric orbit
- Regime: Medium Earth orbit
- Perigee altitude: 441 km (274 mi)
- Apogee altitude: 2,286 km (1,420 mi)
- Inclination: 68.42°
- Period: 114.09 minutes

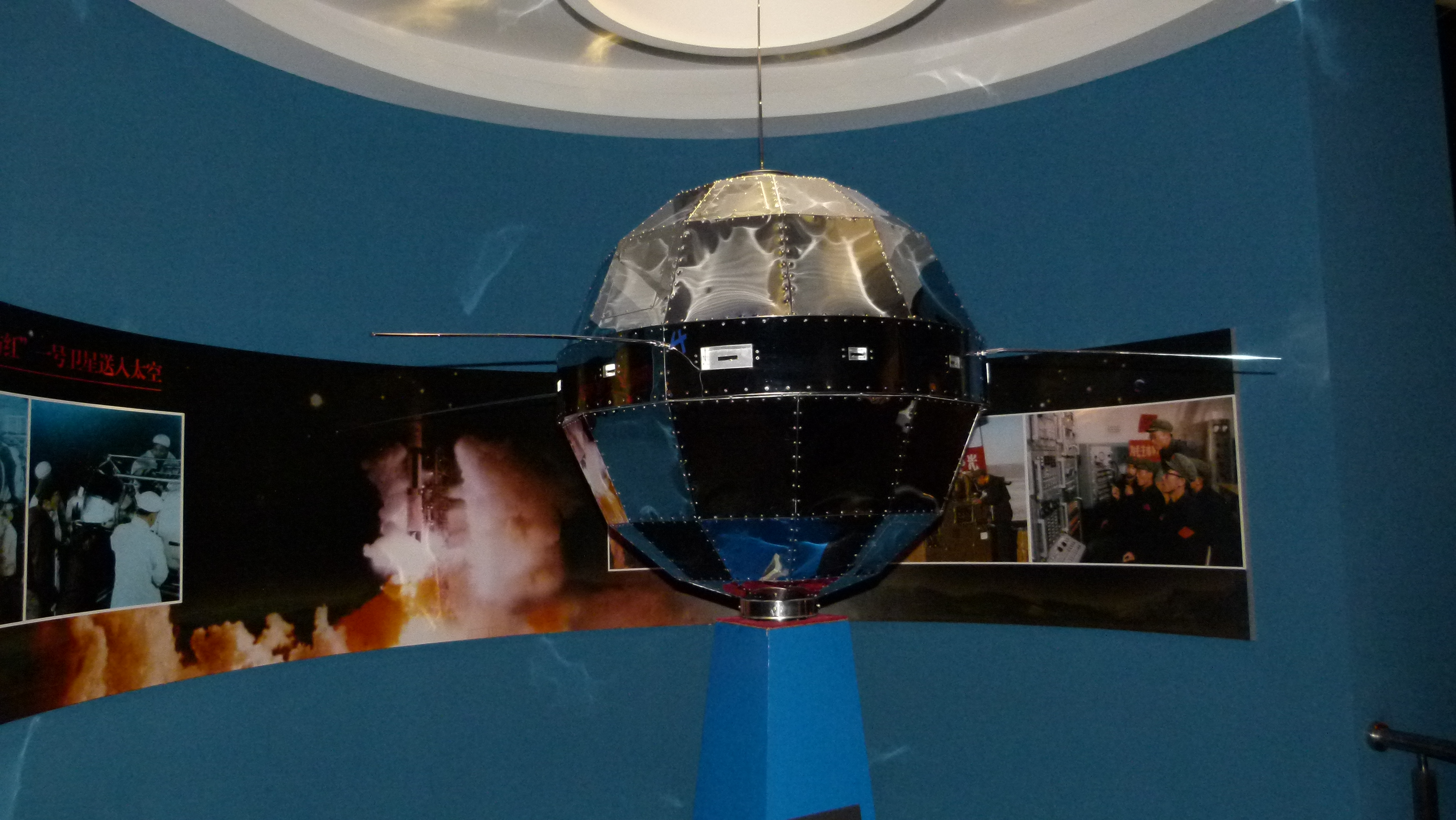
DFH-1 model satellite

Dong Fang Hong 1 broadcasting "East is Red" and telemetry data

Dong Fang Hong 1 (simplified Chinese: 东方红一号; traditional Chinese: 東方紅一號; pinyin: Dōngfānghóng Yīhào; lit. 'The East is Red no.1'), in the western world also known as China 1 or PRC 1, was the first space satellite of the People's Republic of China (PRC), launched successfully on 24 April 1970 as part of the Dongfanghong program. It was a part of the "Two Bombs, One Satellite" program. At 173 kg (381 lb), it was heavier than the first satellites of other countries. The satellite carried a radio transmitter which broadcast the then de facto national anthem of the same name. The broadcast lasted for 20 days while in orbit.

It was developed under the direction of Qian Xuesen, dean of the China Academy of Space Technology (CAST). At the time, a total of five identical satellites were created. The first satellite launched successfully. The academy formulated a "Three-Satellite Plan" consisting of Dongfanghong 1, re-entry satellites, and geosynchronous orbit communications satellites. Sun Jiadong was responsible for the Dongfanghong 1 technology. In 1967, Dang Hongxin chose a copper antenna membrane that resolved the difficulties of broadcasting on an ultra-short wave antenna between 100 °C and −100 °C. Engineers installed a music player playing "The East is Red" on the satellite.

== Launch ==
The universe sings The East is Red, 1970 documentary film about the launch of DFH-1

While Dongfanghong 1 was transported to the launch site by train, armed guards were placed between every two electricity poles. On 24 April 1970, at 13:35:45 GMT, a Long March 1 (CZ-1) lifted off from the Jiuquan Satellite Launch Center, placing the Dongfanghong 1 satellite in orbit at 13:48 GMT.

== Objectives ==
The primary purpose of the Dong Fang Hong 1 satellite was to perform tests of satellite technology and take readings of the ionosphere and atmosphere.

== Satellite design ==
The satellite was similar in shape to a symmetrical 72-faced polyhedron, had a mass of 173 kg (381 lb), and had a diameter of approximately 1 m (3 ft 3 in). It spun 120 times per minute for stabilization. The outer surface was coated with a processed aluminum alloy for temperature control. The main body of the sphere had four ultrashortwave whip antennas of at least 2 m (6 ft 7 in) in length. The lower section was connected to a stage containing a rocket motor. It had a shiny metallic ring added to the bottom, with brightness magnitude from +5 to +8.

== Orbit ==
The satellite was launched into orbit with a perigee of 441 km (274 mi), an apogee of 2,286 km (1,420 mi) and inclination of 68.42°. This near-Earth elliptical orbit has an orbital period of 114.09 minutes. It has Satellite Catalog Number 04382 and International Designator 1970-034A.

Dong Fang Hong 1 had a design life of 20 days. During that time, it transmitted telemetry data and space readings to the Earth. On 14 May 1970, its signal stopped.

Orbit change in time (free fall)
Date (AD)	Perigee (km)	Apogee (km)
24 April 1970	441	2286
23 August 1996	431	2164
1 January 2010	430	2073
15 April 2022	429	2030

== Reaction ==
With the successful launch of Dong Fang Hong 1, China became the fifth country after the Soviet Union, United States, France, and Japan to independently launch a satellite. Although Dong Fang Hong 1 was launched nearly 13 years after Sputnik I, its mass exceeded the combined masses of the first satellites of the other four countries. After this launch, Qian Xuesen proposed to the Chinese government that China should develop a crewed space program and submitted a crewed space undertaking report to which Mao Zedong personally approved.

On 21 April 2005, the Chinese Academy of Space Technology gathered the science and technology personnel who participated in the design, manufacture, production, and supervision of Dong Fang Hong 1. The birthplace of Dong Fang Hong 1, the Beijing Satellite Manufacturing Plant, was used as a monument. The manufacturing plant, in coordination with the Shenzhou 5 crewed spacecraft anniversary, created a 1:1 scale replica of the Dong Fang Hong 1 satellite. It was exhibited in the Beijing Planetarium.

== See also ==
- Two Bombs, One Satellite
- Timeline of artificial satellites and space probes
