= DF-4 =

Chinese ICBM

DF-4/CSS-3
- Type: ICBM
- Place of origin: People's Republic of China

Service history
- In service: 1975/1976–2023
- Used by: PLA Rocket Force

Production history
- Manufacturer: Factory 211 (Capital Astronautics Co.)
- Unit cost: ?

Specifications
- Mass: 82,000 kg
- Length: 28.05 m
- Diameter: 2.25 m
- Warhead: One, or three (DF-4A)
- Blast yield: 3.3 Mt
- Engine: Liquid fueled
- Operational range: 5,500 km
- Maximum speed: ?
- Guidance system: Astro-inertial guidance
- Accuracy: 1.5 km

The Dongfeng 4 (Chinese: 东风-4; pinyin: Dōng Fēng Sì; lit. 'East Wind 4') or DF-4 (also known as the CSS-3) is a first-generation two-stage liquid-fuelled Chinese intercontinental ballistic missile. It was estimated to be deployed in limited numbers in underground silos beginning in the late 1970s and retired around 2023, deploying around 10 to 15 launchers in the late 2010s. The yield of its nuclear warhead was estimated at 3.5 megatons.

The DF-4's rocket propellant is the hypergolic mixture of nitric acid and unsymmetrical dimethylhydrazine. The DF-4 has a takeoff thrust of 1,224.00 kN, a takeoff weight of 82000 kg, a diameter of 2.25 m, a length of 28.05 m and a fin span of 2.74 m. The range of the DF-4, equipped with a 2,190 kg nuclear warhead with a 3.5 megaton yield, was nominally 5,500 km. This gives it sufficient range to strike targets as far away as Russia, India, and American bases in the Pacific. It was the first Chinese missile capable of striking the Soviet capital city of Moscow and US assets on Guam. The missile uses an inertial guidance system, resulting in a large CEP of 1,500 meters.

The nuclear warhead for the DF-4, named "512", was tested in China's tenth, eleventh, and twelfth nuclear tests.

== History ==
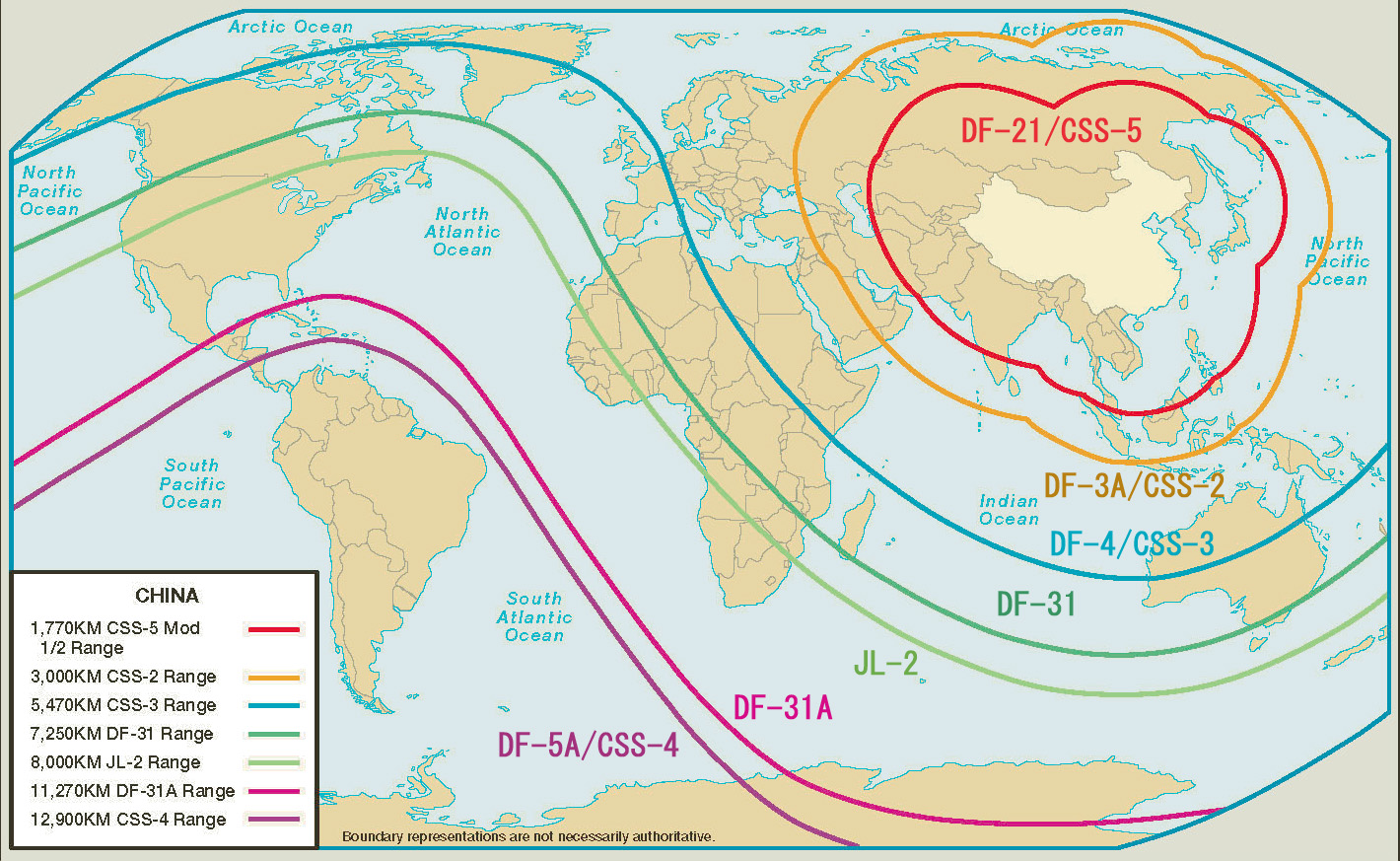
Range of various Chinese missiles (2007); DF-4 range in light blue.

The decision to develop the DF-4 was made in 1965 in response to the U.S. ballistic missile submarine patrols that began operating out of Guam. The missile's designer has been variously identified as Ren Xinmin or Tu Shou'e [屠守锷], and it was produced at Factory 211 (Capital Astronautics Co. [首都航天机械公司], also known as Capital Machine Shop [首都机械厂]).

In 1972 US intelligence estimated an Initial Operational Capability for this system as being expected in 1974 or 1975. Deployment actually began in 1975–76, but only four DF-4s were believed to be in place by 1984.

There were two versions of the missile developed, one version housed in caves or garages to be rolled out on launch and another silo based version.

The US DoD estimates that the missile will continue to serve as a regional deterrence instrument until they can be replaced by the DF-31. This will be a significant capability gain for the Second Artillery Corps. The DF-31A has a range of 11,700 kilometers (as opposed to just 7,000 for the DF-4) and is road- and rail-mobile, and thus more survivable than the silo-based DF-4.

== Operators ==
- China: The People's Liberation Army Rocket Force was the only operator of the Dong-Feng 4.

Preceded by DF-3	DF-4	Succeeded by DF-5
