= List of Long March launches (2020–2024) =

This is a list of launches made by the Long March rocket family between 2020 and 2024.

== Launch statistics ==
=== Rocket configurations ===
- Long March 2C
- Long March 2D
- Long March 2F
- Long March 3B
- Long March 3C
- Long March 4B
- Long March 4C
- Long March 5
- Long March 5B
- Long March 6
- Long March 6A
- Long March 6C
- Long March 7
- Long March 7A
- Long March 8
- Long March 8A
- Long March 11
- Long March 12

=== Launch outcomes ===
- Failure
- Partial failure
- Success
- Planned

== Launch history ==
=== 2020 ===
Date/time (UTC)	Rocket	Serial number	Launch site	Outcome
Date/time (UTC)	Payload	Separation orbit	Operator	Function
Date/time (UTC)	Remarks			
7 January 2020; 15:20	Long March 3B/E	F-65	Xichang, LA-2	Successful
7 January 2020; 15:20	TJS-5	Geosynchronous		Communication (?)
15 January 2020; 02:53	Long March 2D	F-45	Taiyuan, LA-9	Successful
15 January 2020; 02:53	Jilin-1 Kuanfu-01	Sun-synchronous	Chang Guang Satellite Technology	Earth imaging
15 January 2020; 02:53	ÑuSat-7	Sun-synchronous	Satellogic	Commercial Earth Observations
15 January 2020; 02:53	ÑuSat-8	Sun-synchronous	Satellogic	Commercial Earth Observations
19 February 2020; 21:07	Long March 2D	F-46	Xichang, LA-3	Successful
19 February 2020; 21:07	XJSS C	Low Earth		Technology
19 February 2020; 21:07	XJSS D	Low Earth		Technology
19 February 2020; 21:07	XJSS E	Low Earth		Technology
19 February 2020; 21:07	XJSS F	Low Earth		Technology
9 March 2020; 11:55	Long March 3B/E	F-66	Xichang, LA-2	Successful
9 March 2020; 11:55	BeiDou-3 G2	Geosynchronous transfer		Navigation
16 March 2020; 13:34	Long March 7A	F-01	Wenchang, LA-2	Failure
16 March 2020; 13:34	XJY 6-01	Geosynchronous transfer		Technology
16 March 2020; 13:34	Vehicle disintegrated at first stage separation due to booster LOX pressurization failure leading to engine shutdown and loss of control. First flight of the Long March 7A.			
24 March 2020; 03:43	Long March 2C	F-52	Xichang, LA-3	Successful
24 March 2020; 03:43	Yaogan 30-06A	Low Earth		Probable Sigint
24 March 2020; 03:43	Yaogan 30-06B	Low Earth		Probable Sigint
24 March 2020; 03:43	Yaogan 30-06C	Low Earth		Probable Sigint
9 April 2020; 11:46	Long March 3B/E	F-67	Xichang, LA-2	Failure
9 April 2020; 11:46	Palapa-N1 (Nusantara Dua)	Geosynchronous transfer (planned)		Communication
9 April 2020; 11:46	Third stage engine failed to ignite.			
5 May 2020; 10:00	Long March 5B	F-01	Wenchang Spacecraft Launch Site, LA-1	Successful
5 May 2020; 10:00	Prototype Chinese next-generation crewed spacecraft	Low Earth	CNSA / CMSEO	Flight test
5 May 2020; 10:00	Experimental Flexible Inflatable Cargo Re-entry Vehicle	Low Earth		Technical Demonstration
5 May 2020; 10:00	First flight of Long March 5B. Some debris from the CZ-5B's core stage may have survived reentry and fell on villages in the Ivory Coast.			
29 May 2020; 20:13	Long March 11	F-09	Xichang	Successful
29 May 2020; 20:13	XJS-G (Chuangxin 6-01)	Low Earth	Shanghai Engineering Center for Microsatellites	Earth observation technology
29 May 2020; 20:13	XJS-H	Low Earth	National University of Defense Technology	Earth observation technology
31 May 2020; 08:53	Long March 2D	F-47	Jiuquan, LA-4/SLS-2	Successful
31 May 2020; 08:53	Gaofen 9-02	Sun-synchronous		Earth observation
31 May 2020; 08:53	HEAD 4	Sun-synchronous	HEAD Aerospace Tech Co Ltd (Beijing)	Technology
10 June 2020; 18:31	Long March 2C	F-53	Taiyuan LA-9	Successful
10 June 2020; 18:31	HaiYang 1D	Sun-synchronous		Ocean observations
17 June 2020; 07:19	Long March 2D	F-48	Jiuquan, LA-4/SLS-2	Successful
17 June 2020; 07:19	Gaofen 9-03	Sun-synchronous		Earth observation
17 June 2020; 07:19	HEAD 5	Sun-synchronous	HEAD Aerospace Tech Co Ltd (Beijing)	Technology
17 June 2020; 07:19	ZDPS-3 (Pixing 3A)	Sun-synchronous	Zhejiang University	Technology
23 June 2020; 01:43	Long March 3B/E	F-68	Xichang, LA-2	Successful
23 June 2020; 01:43	BeiDou-3 G3	Geosynchronous transfer		Navigation
3 July 2020; 03:10	Long March 4B	F-36	Taiyuan LA-9	Successful
3 July 2020; 03:10	Gaofen Multi-Mode	Sun-synchronous		Earth observation
3 July 2020; 03:10	BY-70-2	Sun-synchronous	CAST, Beijing Bayi High School	Technology
4 July 2020; 23:44	Long March 2D	F-49	Jiuquan, LA-4/SLS-2	Successful
4 July 2020; 23:44	Shiyan 6-02	Sun-synchronous		Technology
9 July 2020; 12:11	Long March 3B/E	F-69	Xichang LA-3	Successful
9 July 2020; 12:11	APStar 6D	Geosynchronous transfer	APT Mobile Satcom Ltd.	Communication
23 July 2020; 04:41	Long March 5	F-04	Wenchang LA-1	Successful
23 July 2020; 04:41	Tianwen-1	Mars transfer	CNSA	Mars orbiter/lander/rover/Group of cubesat cameras
25 July 2020; 03:13	Long March 4B	F-37	Taiyuan LA-9	Successful
25 July 2020; 03:13	Ziyuan 3-03	Sun-synchronous	Ministry of Natural Resources	Earth Observation
25 July 2020; 03:13	Tianqi-10	Sun-synchronous	Guodian Gaoke	IoT
25 July 2020; 03:13	NJU-HKU 1	Sun-synchronous	Nanjing University/University of Hong Kong	X-ray astronomy
6 August 2020; 04:01	Long March 2D	F-50	Jiuquan, LA-4/SLS-2	Successful
6 August 2020; 04:01	Gaofen 9-04	Sun-synchronous		Earth observation
23 August 2020; 02:27	Long March 2D	F-51	Jiuquan, LA-4/SLS-2	Successful
23 August 2020; 02:27	Gaofen 9-05	Sun-synchronous		Earth observation
23 August 2020; 02:27	Tiantuo 5	Sun-synchronous	National University of Defense Technology	Technology
23 August 2020; 02:27	DGSW	Sun-synchronous	Academy of Military Science	Technology
4 September 2020; 07:30	Long March 2F/T	T3	Jiuquan, SLS-1	Successful
4 September 2020; 07:30	Reusable Experimental Spacecraft	Low Earth	CASC	Flight test
4 September 2020; 07:30	Suspected to be prototype spaceplane, but not officially confirmed.			
7 September 2020; 05:57	Long March 4B	F-38	Taiyuan LA-9	Successful
7 September 2020; 05:57	Gaofen 11-02	Sun-synchronous		Earth Observation
15 September 2020; 01:23	Long March 11	F-10	Special converted barge, Yellow Sea (34.31° N, 123.76° E)	Successful
15 September 2020; 01:23	Jilin-1 High Resolution 03B-01	Sun-synchronous	Chang Guang Satellite Technology	Earth imaging
15 September 2020; 01:23	Jilin-1 High Resolution 03B-02	Sun-synchronous	Chang Guang Satellite Technology	Earth imaging
15 September 2020; 01:23	Jilin-1 High Resolution 03B-03	Sun-synchronous	Chang Guang Satellite Technology	Earth imaging
15 September 2020; 01:23	Jilin-1 High Resolution 03B-04	Sun-synchronous	Chang Guang Satellite Technology	Earth imaging
15 September 2020; 01:23	Jilin-1 High Resolution 03B-05	Sun-synchronous	Chang Guang Satellite Technology	Earth imaging
15 September 2020; 01:23	Jilin-1 High Resolution 03B-06	Sun-synchronous	Chang Guang Satellite Technology	Earth imaging
15 September 2020; 01:23	Jilin-1 High Resolution 03C-01	Sun-synchronous	Chang Guang Satellite Technology	Earth imaging
15 September 2020; 01:23	Jilin-1 High Resolution 03C-02	Sun-synchronous	Chang Guang Satellite Technology	Earth imaging
15 September 2020; 01:23	Jilin-1 High Resolution 03C-03	Sun-synchronous	Chang Guang Satellite Technology	Earth imaging
21 September 2020; 05:40	Long March 4B	F-39	Jiuquan, LA-4/SLS-2	Successful
21 September 2020; 05:40	Haiyang-2C	Low Earth		Ocean Observation
27 September 2020; 03:23	Long March 4B	F-40	Taiyuan LA-9	Successful
27 September 2020; 03:23	Huanjing-2A	Sun-synchronous		Earth Observation
27 September 2020; 03:23	Huanjing-2B	Sun-synchronous		Earth Observation
11 October 2020; 16:57	Long March 3B/E	F-70	Xichang, LA-2	Successful
11 October 2020; 16:57	Gaofen-13	Geostationary transfer		Earth Observation
26 October 2020; 15:19	Long March 2C	F-54	Xichang, LA-3	Successful
26 October 2020; 15:19	Yaogan 30-07A	Low Earth		Sigint
26 October 2020; 15:19	Yaogan 30-07B	Low Earth		Sigint
26 October 2020; 15:19	Yaogan 30-07C	Low Earth		Sigint
26 October 2020; 15:19	Tianqi Xingzuo 06	Low Earth		Communications
6 November 2020; 03:19	Long March 6	F-4	Taiyuan, LA-16	Successful
6 November 2020; 03:19	ÑuSat-9	Sun-synchronous		Earth imaging
6 November 2020; 03:19	ÑuSat-10	Sun-synchronous		Earth imaging
6 November 2020; 03:19	ÑuSat-11	Sun-synchronous		Earth imaging
6 November 2020; 03:19	ÑuSat-12	Sun-synchronous		Earth imaging
6 November 2020; 03:19	ÑuSat-13	Sun-synchronous		Earth imaging
6 November 2020; 03:19	ÑuSat-14	Sun-synchronous		Earth imaging
6 November 2020; 03:19	ÑuSat-15	Sun-synchronous		Earth imaging
6 November 2020; 03:19	ÑuSat-16	Sun-synchronous		Earth imaging
6 November 2020; 03:19	ÑuSat-17	Sun-synchronous		Earth imaging
6 November 2020; 03:19	ÑuSat-18	Sun-synchronous		Earth imaging
6 November 2020; 03:19	Tianyan 05	Sun-synchronous		Remote sensing
6 November 2020; 03:19	Beihang Kongshi 1	Sun-synchronous		Technology demonstration
6 November 2020; 03:19	BY 70-3	Sun-synchronous		Amateur radio
12 November 2020; 15:59	Long March 3B/E	F-71	Xichang, LA-2	Successful
12 November 2020; 15:59	Tiantong 1-02	Geostationary transfer		Mobile Communications
23 November 2020; 20:30	Long March 5	F-05	Wenchang, LC-1	Successful
23 November 2020; 20:30	Chang'e 5	Lunar transfer	CNSA	Lunar Sample Return
6 December 2020; 03:58	Long March 3B/E	F-72	Xichang, LA-3	Successful
6 December 2020; 03:58	Gaofen-14	Sun-synchronous		Earth observation
6 December 2020; 03:58	First launcher Long March 3B/G5.			
9 December 2020; 20:14	Long March 11	F-11	Xichang	Successful
9 December 2020; 20:14	GECAM A (Xiaoji)	Low Earth		Gravitational-wave astronomy
9 December 2020; 20:14	GECAM B (Xiaomu)	Low Earth		Gravitational-wave astronomy
22 December 2020; 04:37	Long March 8	F-01	Wenchang, LC-2	Successful
22 December 2020; 04:37	Xinjishu Yanzheng-7 (XJY-7)	Sun-synchronous		Technology demonstration
22 December 2020; 04:37	Haisi-1	Sun-synchronous	Tianyi Research Company	Earth observation
22 December 2020; 04:37	Tianqi-8	Sun-synchronous	Guodian Gaoke	IoT
22 December 2020; 04:37	Yuanguang	Sun-synchronous	Tianyi Research Company	
22 December 2020; 04:37	ET-SMART-RSS	Sun-synchronous	ESSTI/SMART	Earth observation
22 December 2020; 04:37	Maiden flight of Long March 8.			
27 December 2020; 15:44	Long March 4C	F-29	Jiuquan, LA-4/SLS-2	Successful
27 December 2020; 15:44	Yaogan-33-02	Sun-synchronous		Reconnaissance

=== 2021 ===
Date/time (UTC)	Rocket	Serial number	Launch site	Outcome
Date/time (UTC)	Payload	Separation orbit	Operator	Function
Date/time (UTC)	Remarks			
19 January 2021; 16:25	Long March 3B/E	F-73	Xichang, LA-2	Successful
19 January 2021; 16:25	Tiantong 1-03	Geostationary transfer	China Satcom	Communication
29 January 2021; 04:47	Long March 4C	F-30	Jiuquan, LA-4/SLS-2	Successful
29 January 2021; 04:47	Yaogan 31-02A	Low Earth		Reconnaissance
29 January 2021; 04:47	Yaogan 31-02B	Low Earth		Reconnaissance
29 January 2021; 04:47	Yaogan 31-02C	Low Earth		Reconnaissance
4 February 2021; 15:36	Long March 3B/E	F-74	Xichang, LA-3	Successful
4 February 2021; 15:36	TJS-6	Geostationary transfer	SAST	Communication
24 February 2021; 02:22	Long March 4C	F-31	Jiuquan, LA-4/SLS-2	Successful
24 February 2021; 02:22	Yaogan 31-03A	Low Earth		Reconnaissance
24 February 2021; 02:22	Yaogan 31-03B	Low Earth		Reconnaissance
24 February 2021; 02:22	Yaogan 31-03C	Low Earth		Reconnaissance
11 March 2021; 17:51	Long March 7A	F-02	Wenchang, LC-2	Successful
11 March 2021; 17:51	Shiyan 9	Geostationary transfer		Technology demonstration
11 March 2021; 17:51	First successful flight of the Long March 7A.			
13 March 2021; 02:19	Long March 4C	F-32	Jiuquan, LA-4/SLS-2	Successful
13 March 2021; 02:19	Yaogan 31-04A	Low Earth		Reconnaissance
13 March 2021; 02:19	Yaogan 31-04B	Low Earth		Reconnaissance
13 March 2021; 02:19	Yaogan 31-04C	Low Earth		Reconnaissance
30 March 2021; 22:45	Long March 4C	F-33	Jiuquan, LA-4/SLS-2	Successful
30 March 2021; 22:45	Gaofen 12-02	Sun-synchronous		Earth observation
8 April 2021; 23:01	Long March 4B	F-41	Taiyuan, LC-9	Successful
8 April 2021; 23:01	Shiyan 6-03	Sun-synchronous	CAST	Technology demonstration
27 April 2021; 03:20	Long March 6	F-05	Taiyuan, LC-16	Successful
27 April 2021; 03:20	Qilu-1	Sun-synchronous	Shandong Institute of Industrial Technology (SDIIT)	Earth observation
27 April 2021; 03:20	Qilu-4	Sun-synchronous	Shandong Institute of Industrial Technology (SDIIT)	Earth observation
27 April 2021; 03:20	Foshan-1	Sun-synchronous	Ji Hua Laboratory	Earth observation
27 April 2021; 03:20	Zhongan Guotong-1	Sun-synchronous	Zhongan Guotong Satellite Technology Development	Earth observation
27 April 2021; 03:20	Tianqi-9	Sun-synchronous	Guodian Gaoke	IoT
27 April 2021; 03:20	Origin Space NEO-1	Sun-synchronous	Origin Space	Technology demonstration
27 April 2021; 03:20	Tai King II 01	Sun-synchronous	MinoSpace	Earth observation
27 April 2021; 03:20	Golden Bauhinia-1 01	Sun-synchronous	ZeroG Lab	Earth observation
27 April 2021; 03:20	Golden Bauhinia-1 02	Sun-synchronous	ZeroG Lab	Earth observation
27 April 2021; 03:20	First Long March commercial rideshare mission with launch services contraced by CGWIC.			
29 April 2021; 03:23	Long March 5B	F-02	Wenchang, LA-1	Successful
29 April 2021; 03:23	Tianhe	Low Earth	CNSA	Space station core module
29 April 2021; 03:23	Second launch of Long March 5B. On 9 May 2021, the core stage reentered the atmosphere and debris that did not burn up impacted the Indian Ocean west of Maldives.			
30 April 2021; 07:27	Long March 4C	F-34	Jiuquan, LA-4/SLS-2	Successful
30 April 2021; 07:27	Yaogan 34	Low Earth	CAS	Earth observation
6 May 2021; 18:11	Long March 2C	F-55	Xichang, LA-3	Successful
6 May 2021; 18:11	Yaogan 30-08A	Low Earth	CAS	Sigint
6 May 2021; 18:11	Yaogan 30-08B	Low Earth	CAS	Sigint
6 May 2021; 18:11	Yaogan 30-08C	Low Earth	CAS	Sigint
6 May 2021; 18:11	Tianqi-12	Low Earth	Guodian Gaoke	IoT
19 May 2021; 04:03	Long March 4B	F-42	Jiuquan, LA-4/SLS-2	Successful
19 May 2021; 04:03	HaiYang 2D	Low Earth	Ministry of Natural Resources	Earth observation
29 May 2021; 12:55	Long March 7	F-03	Wenchang, LC-2	Successful
29 May 2021; 12:55	Tianzhou 2	Low Earth (TSS)	CNSA	Space logistics
29 May 2021; 12:55	First cargo flight to the Tiangong Space Station.			
2 June 2021; 16:17	Long March 3B/E	F-75	Xichang, LA-2	Successful
2 June 2021; 16:17	Fengyun 4B	Geosynchronous	CMA	Meteorology
11 June 2021; 03:03	Long March 2D	F-52	Taiyuan, LA-9	Successful
11 June 2021; 03:03	Beijing-3 01	Sun-synchronous	China Spacesat	Earth observation
11 June 2021; 03:03	Hisea-2	Sun-synchronous	Xiamen University	Earth observation
11 June 2021; 03:03	Yang Wang-1	Sun-synchronous	Origin Space	Space telescope / Asteroid cataloguing
11 June 2021; 03:03	Tianjian (TKSY01-TJ)	Sun-synchronous	PLASSF Space Engineering University	Technology demonstration
17 June 2021; 01:22	Long March 2F/G	F-15	Jiuquan, LA-4/SLS-1	Successful
17 June 2021; 01:22	Shenzhou 12	Low Earth (TSS)	CNSA	Crewed spaceflight
17 June 2021; 01:22	First crewed flight to the Tianhe core module of the Chinese Space Station.			
18 June 2021; 06:30	Long March 2C	F-56	Xichang, LA-3	Successful
18 June 2021; 06:30	Yaogan 30-09A	Low Earth	CAS	Sigint
18 June 2021; 06:30	Yaogan 30-09B	Low Earth	CAS	Sigint
18 June 2021; 06:30	Yaogan 30-09C	Low Earth	CAS	Sigint
18 June 2021; 06:30	Tianqi-14	Low Earth	Guodian Gaoke	IoT
3 July 2021; 02:51	Long March 2D	F-53	Taiyuan, LA-9	Successful
3 July 2021; 02:51	Jilin-1 Kuanfu-01B	Sun-synchronous	Chang Guang Satellite Technology	Earth observation
3 July 2021; 02:51	Jilin-1 Gaofen-03D 01	Sun-synchronous	Chang Guang Satellite Technology	Earth observation
3 July 2021; 02:51	Jilin-1 Gaofen-03D 02	Sun-synchronous	Chang Guang Satellite Technology	Earth observation
3 July 2021; 02:51	Jilin-1 Gaofen-03D 03	Sun-synchronous	Chang Guang Satellite Technology	Earth observation
3 July 2021; 02:51	Xingshidai-10	Sun-synchronous	ADA Space	Earth observation
4 July 2021; 23:28	Long March 4C	F-35	Jiuquan, LA-4/SLS-2	Successful
4 July 2021; 23:28	Fengyun 3E	Sun-synchronous	CMA	Meteorology
6 July 2021; 15:53	Long March 3C/E	F-18	Xichang, LA-2	Successful
6 July 2021; 15:53	Tianlian I-05	Geosynchronous	CNSA	Communications
9 July 2021; 11:59	Long March 6	F-06	Taiyuan, LA-16	Successful
9 July 2021; 11:59	Zhuzhou-1 01	Low Earth	Zhuzhou State Investment Group	Earth observation
9 July 2021; 11:59	Zhuzhou-1 02	Low Earth	Zhuzhou State Investment Group	Earth observation
9 July 2021; 11:59	Zhuzhou-1 03	Low Earth	Zhuzhou State Investment Group	Earth observation
9 July 2021; 11:59	Zhuzhou-1 04	Low Earth	Zhuzhou State Investment Group	Earth observation
9 July 2021; 11:59	Zhuzhou-1 05	Low Earth	Zhuzhou State Investment Group	Earth observation
19 July 2021; 00:19	Long March 2C	F-57	Xichang, LA-3	Successful
19 July 2021; 00:19	Yaogan 30-10A	Low Earth	CAS	Sigint
19 July 2021; 00:19	Yaogan 30-10B	Low Earth	CAS	Sigint
19 July 2021; 00:19	Yaogan 30-10C	Low Earth	CAS	Sigint
19 July 2021; 00:19	Tianqi-15	Low Earth	Guodian Gaoke	IoT
19 July 2021; 00:19	A fairing recovery system through parachutes has been tested with this launch.			
29 July 2021; 04:01	Long March 2D	F-54	Jiuquan, LA-4/SLS-2	Successful
29 July 2021; 04:01	Tianhui-1D	Sun-synchronous	CNSA	Earth observation
4 August 2021; 11:01	Long March 6	F-07	Taiyuan, LA-16	Successful
4 August 2021; 11:01	KL-Beta A	Polar	KLEO connect	Communications
4 August 2021; 11:01	KL-Beta B	Polar	KLEO Connect	Communications
5 August 2021; 16:30	Long March 3B/E	F-76	Xichang, LA-2	Successful
5 August 2021; 16:30	ChinaSat 2E	Geostationary transfer	China Satcom	Communication
18 August 2021; 22:32	Long March 4B	F-43	Taiyuan, LA-9	Successful
18 August 2021; 22:32	Tianhui-2 02A	Sun-synchronous	CNSA	Earth observation
18 August 2021; 22:32	Tianhui-2 02B	Sun-synchronous	CNSA	Earth observation
24 August 2021; 11:15	Long March 2C + YZ-1S	F-58	Jiuquan, LA-4/SLS-2	Successful
24 August 2021; 11:15	RSW-01	Polar	CAST	Communication
24 August 2021; 11:15	RSW-02	Polar	CAST	Communication
24 August 2021; 11:15	TBA	Polar	DFH Satellite	Communication
24 August 2021; 15:41	Long March 3B/E	F-77	Xichang, LA-3	Successful
24 August 2021; 15:41	TJS-7	Geostationary transfer	SAST	Communication
7 September 2021; 03:01	Long March 4C	F-40	Taiyuan, LA-9	Successful
7 September 2021; 03:01	Gaofen 5-02	Sun-synchronous	CNSA	Earth observation
9 September 2021; 11:50	Long March 3B/E	F-78	Xichang, LA-2	Successful
9 September 2021; 11:50	ChinaSat 9B	Geostationary transfer	China Satcom	Communication
20 September 2021; 07:10	Long March 7	F-04	Wenchang, LC-2	Successful
20 September 2021; 07:10	Tianzhou 3	Low Earth (TSS)	CNSA	Space logistics
20 September 2021; 07:10	Second cargo flight to the Tiangong Space Station.			
27 September 2021; 08:20	Long March 3B/E	F-79	Xichang, LA-3	Successful
27 September 2021; 08:20	Shiyan 10	Inclined geosynchronous	CAST	Technology demonstration
27 September 2021; 08:20	Satellite experienced a failure in orbit following successful launch. It was subsequently reactivated and began to raise its orbit in mid-October.			
14 October 2021; 09:51	Long March 2D	F-55	Taiyuan, LA-9	Successful
14 October 2021; 09:51	Chinese Hα Solar Explorer (CHASE / Xihe)	Sun-synchronous	Nanjing University / SAST	Solar physics
14 October 2021; 09:51	Guidao Daqi Midu TSW	Sun-synchronous	CMA	Earth observation
14 October 2021; 09:51	HEAD-2E	Sun-synchronous	HEAD Aerospace Group	Earth observation
14 October 2021; 09:51	HEAD-2F	Sun-synchronous	HEAD Aerospace Group	Earth observation
14 October 2021; 09:51	MOTS	Sun-synchronous	Shanghai Lizheng Satellite	Technology demonstration
14 October 2021; 09:51	QX-1	Sun-synchronous	Shenzhen DFH	Technology demonstration
14 October 2021; 09:51	SSS-1	Sun-synchronous	Beihang University / APSCO	Education
14 October 2021; 09:51	Tianshu-1	Sun-synchronous	Insight Position Digital Intelligence Technology Service	Technology demonstration
14 October 2021; 09:51	Golden Bauhinia-2	Sun-synchronous	ZeroG Lab	Earth observation
14 October 2021; 09:51	SSS-2A	Sun-synchronous	SJTU / APSCO	Education
14 October 2021; 09:51	Tianyuan-1	Sun-synchronous	NJUST	Technology demonstration
15 October 2021; 16:23	Long March 2F/G	F-16	Jiuquan, LA-4/SLS-1	Successful
15 October 2021; 16:23	Shenzhou 13	Low Earth (TSS)	CNSA	Crewed spaceflight
15 October 2021; 16:23	Second crewed flight to the Tianhe core module of the Chinese Space Station.			
24 October 2021; 01:27	Long March 3B/E	F-80	Xichang, LA-2	Successful
24 October 2021; 01:27	Shijian 21	Geosynchronous	CAST	Technology demonstration
3 November 2021; 07:43	Long March 2C + YZ-1S	F-59	Jiuquan, LA-4/SLS-2	Successful
3 November 2021; 07:43	Yaogan 32-02A	Sun-synchronous	CAS	Reconnaissance
3 November 2021; 07:43	Yaogan 32-02B	Sun-synchronous	CAS	Reconnaissance
5 November 2021; 02:19	Long March 6	F-08	Taiyuan, LA-16	Successful
5 November 2021; 02:19	SDGSAT-1 (Guangmu, CASEarth)	Sun-synchronous	CAS	Earth observation
6 November 2021; 03:00	Long March 2D	F-56	Xichang, LA-3	Successful
6 November 2021; 03:00	Yaogan 35A	Low Earth	CAS	Reconnaissance
6 November 2021; 03:00	Yaogan 35B	Low Earth	CAS	Reconnaissance
6 November 2021; 03:00	Yaogan 35C	Low Earth	CAS	Reconnaissance
20 November 2021; 01:51	Long March 4B	F-44	Taiyuan, LC-9	Successful
20 November 2021; 01:51	Gaofen 11-03	Sun-synchronous	CNSA	Earth observation
22 November 2021; 23:45	Long March 4C	F-37	Jiuquan, LA-4/SLS-2	Successful
22 November 2021; 23:45	Gaofen 03-02	Sun-synchronous	Ministry of Natural Resources	Earth observation
26 November 2021; 16:40	Long March 3B/E	F-81	Xichang, LA-2	Successful
26 November 2021; 16:40	ChinaSat 1D	Geosynchronous	China Satcom	Communications
10 December 2021; 00:11	Long March 4B	F-45	Jiuquan SLS-2	Successful
10 December 2021; 00:11	Shijian 6-05A	Sun-synchronous	CNSA	ELINT
10 December 2021; 00:11	Shijian 6-05B	Sun-synchronous	CNSA	ELINT
10 December 2021; 00:11	The 400th launch of the Long March series rocket.			
13 December 2021; 16:09	Long March 3B/E	F-82	Xichang, LA-3	Successful
13 December 2021; 16:09	Tianlian II-02	Geosynchronous	CNSA	Communications
23 December 2021; 10:12	Long March 7A	F-03	Wenchang, LC-2	Successful
23 December 2021; 10:12	Shiyan 12-01	Geosynchronous	CAST	Technology demonstration
23 December 2021; 10:12	Shiyan 12-02	Geosynchronous	CAST	Technology demonstration
26 December 2021; 03:11:31	Long March 4C	F-38	Taiyuan LC-9	Successful
26 December 2021; 03:11:31	Ziyuan I-02E	Sun-synchronous	Ministry of Natural Resources	Earth observation
26 December 2021; 03:11:31	XW-3 (CAS-9)	Sun-synchronous	CAMSAT	Amateur radio
29 December 2021; 11:13	Long March 2D	F-57	Jiuquan SLS-2	Successful
29 December 2021; 11:13	Tianhui-4	Sun-synchronous	CNSA	Earth observation
29 December 2021; 16:43	Long March 3B/E	F-83	Xichang LA-2	Successful
29 December 2021; 16:43	TJS-9	Geosynchronous	SAST	Technology demonstration

=== 2022 ===
Date/time (UTC)	Rocket	Serial number	Launch site	Outcome
Date/time (UTC)	Payload	Separation orbit	Operator	Function
Date/time (UTC)	Remarks			
17 January 2022; 02:35	Long March 2D	F-58	Taiyuan LC-9	Successful
17 January 2022; 02:35	Shiyan 13	Sun-synchronous	CAST	Technology demonstration
25 January 2022; 23:44	Long March 4C	F-39	Jiuquan SLS-2	Successful
25 January 2022; 23:44	Ludi Tance-1 01A	Sun-synchronous	Ministry of Natural Resources	Earth observation
26 February 2022; 23:44	Long March 4C	F-40	Jiuquan SLS-2	Successful
26 February 2022; 23:44	Ludi Tance-1 01B	Sun-synchronous	Ministry of Natural Resources	Earth observation
27 February 2022; 03:06	Long March 8	F-2	Wenchang LC-2	Successful
27 February 2022; 03:06	Dayun (Xingshidai-17)	Sun-synchronous	ADA Space	Earth observation
27 February 2022; 03:06	Hainan-1 01	Sun-synchronous	Sanya Institute of Remote Sensing	Earth observation
27 February 2022; 03:06	Hainan-1 02	Sun-synchronous	Sanya Institute of Remote Sensing	Earth observation
27 February 2022; 03:06	Jilin-1 Gaofen-03D 10	Sun-synchronous	Chang Guang Satellite Technology	Earth observation
27 February 2022; 03:06	Jilin-1 Gaofen-03D 11	Sun-synchronous	Chang Guang Satellite Technology	Earth observation
27 February 2022; 03:06	Jilin-1 Gaofen-03D 12	Sun-synchronous	Chang Guang Satellite Technology	Earth observation
27 February 2022; 03:06	Jilin-1 Gaofen-03D 13	Sun-synchronous	Chang Guang Satellite Technology	Earth observation
27 February 2022; 03:06	Jilin-1 Gaofen-03D 14	Sun-synchronous	Chang Guang Satellite Technology	Earth observation
27 February 2022; 03:06	Jilin-1 Gaofen-03D 15 (Shaoguan-1)	Sun-synchronous	Chang Guang Satellite Technology	Earth observation
27 February 2022; 03:06	Jilin-1 Gaofen-03D 16 (Wenchang Chaosuan-2)	Sun-synchronous	Chang Guang Satellite Technology	Earth observation
27 February 2022; 03:06	Jilin-1 Gaofen-03D 17 (Wenchang Chaosuan-3)	Sun-synchronous	Chang Guang Satellite Technology	Earth observation
27 February 2022; 03:06	Jilin-1 Gaofen-03D 18 (Anxi Tieguanyin-1)	Sun-synchronous	Chang Guang Satellite Technology	Earth observation
27 February 2022; 03:06	Jilin-1 Mofang-02A 01 (Xiamen-1)	Sun-synchronous	Chang Guang Satellite Technology	Technology demonstration
27 February 2022; 03:06	Qimingxing-1	Sun-synchronous	Wuhan University	Earth observation
27 February 2022; 03:06	Taijing-3 01	Sun-synchronous	MinoSpace	Earth observation
27 February 2022; 03:06	Taijing-4 01	Sun-synchronous	MinoSpace	Earth observation
27 February 2022; 03:06	Tianxian-1 (Chaohu-1)	Sun-synchronous	Spacety	Earth observation
27 February 2022; 03:06	Chuangxing Leishen	Sun-synchronous	Spacety	Earth observation
27 February 2022; 03:06	Wenchang-1 01	Sun-synchronous	Sanya Institute of Remote Sensing	Earth observation
27 February 2022; 03:06	Wenchang-1 02	Sun-synchronous	Sanya Institute of Remote Sensing	Earth observation
27 February 2022; 03:06	XD-1	Sun-synchronous	MinoSpace	Earth observation
27 February 2022; 03:06	Tianqi-19	Sun-synchronous	Guodian Gaoke	IoT
5 March 2022; 06:01	Long March 2C	Y62	Xichang LA-3	Successful
5 March 2022; 06:01	Yinhe Hangtian-2 01	Low Earth	GalaxySpace	5G communications
5 March 2022; 06:01	Yinhe Hangtian-2 02	Low Earth	GalaxySpace	5G communications
5 March 2022; 06:01	Yinhe Hangtian-2 03	Low Earth	GalaxySpace	5G communications
5 March 2022; 06:01	Yinhe Hangtian-2 04	Low Earth	GalaxySpace	5G communications
5 March 2022; 06:01	Yinhe Hangtian-2 05	Low Earth	GalaxySpace	5G communications
5 March 2022; 06:01	Yinhe Hangtian-2 06	Low Earth	GalaxySpace	5G communications
5 March 2022; 06:01	Xuanming Xingyuan	Low Earth	SpaceWish	Remote sensing
17 March 2022; 07:09	Long March 4C	F-41	Jiuquan, LA-4/SLS-2	Successful
17 March 2022; 07:09	Yaogan 34-02	Low Earth	CAS	Earth observation
29 March 2022; 09:50	Long March 6A	F-01	Taiyuan, LA-9A	Successful
29 March 2022; 09:50	Pujiang-2	Sun-synchronous	CASC	Earth observation
29 March 2022; 09:50	Tiankun-2	Sun-synchronous	CASIC	Technology demonstration
29 March 2022; 09:50	Maiden flight of Long March 6A and first launch from launch complex 9A in Taiyuan.			
30 March 2022; 02:29	Long March 11	F-12	Jiuquan	Successful
30 March 2022; 02:29	Tianping-2A	Sun-synchronous	CASIC	Radar calibration
30 March 2022; 02:29	Tianping-2B	Sun-synchronous	CASIC	Atmospheric research
30 March 2022; 02:29	Tianping-2C	Sun-synchronous	CASIC	Atmospheric research
6 April 2022; 23:47	Long March 4C	F-42	Jiuquan, LA-4/SLS-2	Successful
6 April 2022; 23:47	Gaofen 03-03	Sun-synchronous	Ministry of Natural Resources	Earth observation
15 April 2022; 12:00	Long March 3B	F-84	Xichang LA-2	Successful
15 April 2022; 12:00	ChinaSat 6D	GTO	China Satcom	Communication
15 April 2022; 18:16	Long March 4C	F-43	Taiyuan, LA-9	Successful
15 April 2022; 18:16	Daqi-1 (Atmosphere-1)	Sun-synchronous	Ministry of Ecology and Environment	Environmental monitoring
29 April 2022; 04:11	Long March 2C	F-61	Jiuquan, LA-4/SLS-2	Successful
29 April 2022; 04:11	SuperView Neo 1-01 (Siwei Gaojing 1-01)	Sun-synchronous	China Siwei	Earth observation
29 April 2022; 04:11	SuperView Neo 1-02 (Siwei Gaojing 1-02)	Sun-synchronous	China Siwei	Earth observation
30 April 2022; 03:30	Long March 11	F-13	Tai Rui converted barge, East China Sea (32.18° N, 123.79° E)	Successful
30 April 2022; 03:30	Jilin-1 Gaofen-03D 04	Sun-synchronous	Chang Guang Satellite Technology	Earth observation
30 April 2022; 03:30	Jilin-1 Gaofen-03D 05	Sun-synchronous	Chang Guang Satellite Technology	Earth observation
30 April 2022; 03:30	Jilin-1 Gaofen-03D 06	Sun-synchronous	Chang Guang Satellite Technology	Earth observation
30 April 2022; 03:30	Jilin-1 Gaofen-03D 07	Sun-synchronous	Chang Guang Satellite Technology	Earth observation
30 April 2022; 03:30	Jilin-1 Gaofen-04A	Sun-synchronous	Chang Guang Satellite Technology	Earth observation
5 May 2022; 02:38	Long March 2D	F-59	Taiyuan, LA-9	Successful
5 May 2022; 02:38	Jilin-1 Kuanfu-01C	Sun-synchronous	Chang Guang Satellite Technology	Earth observation
5 May 2022; 02:38	Jilin-1 Gaofen-03D 27	Sun-synchronous	Chang Guang Satellite Technology	Earth observation
5 May 2022; 02:38	Jilin-1 Gaofen-03D 28	Sun-synchronous	Chang Guang Satellite Technology	Earth observation
5 May 2022; 02:38	Jilin-1 Gaofen-03D 29	Sun-synchronous	Chang Guang Satellite Technology	Earth observation
5 May 2022; 02:38	Jilin-1 Gaofen-03D 30	Sun-synchronous	Chang Guang Satellite Technology	Earth observation
5 May 2022; 02:38	Jilin-1 Gaofen-03D 31	Sun-synchronous	Chang Guang Satellite Technology	Earth observation
5 May 2022; 02:38	Jilin-1 Gaofen-03D 32	Sun-synchronous	Chang Guang Satellite Technology	Earth observation
5 May 2022; 02:38	Jilin-1 Gaofen-03D 33	Sun-synchronous	Chang Guang Satellite Technology	Earth observation
9 May 2022; 17:56	Long March 7	F-05	Wenchang, LC-2	Successful
9 May 2022; 17:56	Tianzhou 4	Low Earth (TSS)	CNSA	Space logistics
9 May 2022; 17:56	Zhixing-3A	Low Earth	Zhixing Space	Earth observation
9 May 2022; 17:56	Third cargo flight to the Tiangong Space Station.			
20 May 2022; 10:30	Long March 2C + YZ-1S	F-62	Jiuquan, LA-4/SLS-2	Successful
20 May 2022; 10:30	LEO Test Sat 1	Low Earth	Chang Guang Satellite Technology	Communication
20 May 2022; 10:30	LEO Test Sat 2	Low Earth	Chang Guang Satellite Technology	Communication
20 May 2022; 10:30	Digui Tongxin Weixing	Low Earth	DFH Satellite	Communication
2 June 2022; 04:00	Long March 2C	F-63	Xichang LA-3	Successful
2 June 2022; 04:00	GeeSAT-1 × 9 (01–09)	Low Earth	Geespace	Navigation communications
5 June 2022; 02:44	Long March 2F/G	F-17	Jiuquan, LA-4/SLS-1	Successful
5 June 2022; 02:44	Shenzhou 14	Low Earth (TSS)	CNSA	Crewed spaceflight
5 June 2022; 02:44	Third crewed flight to the Tiangong Space Station.			
23 June 2022; 02:22	Long March 2D	Y64	Xichang, LA-3	Successful
23 June 2022; 02:22	Yaogan 35-02A	Low Earth	CAS	Reconnaissance
23 June 2022; 02:22	Yaogan 35-02B	Low Earth	CAS	Reconnaissance
23 June 2022; 02:22	Yaogan 35-02C	Low Earth	CAS	Reconnaissance
27 June 2022; 15:46	Long March 4C	F-44	Jiuquan, LA-4/SLS-2	Successful
27 June 2022; 15:46	Gaofen 12-03	Sun-synchronous	CNSA	Earth observation
12 July 2022; 16:30	Long March 3B/E	F-85	Xichang, LA-2	Successful
12 July 2022; 16:30	Tianlian II-03	Geosynchronous	CNSA	Communications
15 July 2022; 22:57	Long March 2C	F-64	Taiyuan, LA-9	Successful
15 July 2022; 22:57	SuperView Neo 2-01 (Siwei Gaojing 1-03)	Sun-synchronous	China Siwei	Earth observation
15 July 2022; 22:57	SuperView Neo 2-02 (Siwei Gaojing 1-04)	Sun-synchronous	China Siwei	Earth observation
24 July 2022; 06:22	Long March 5B	F-03	Wenchang, LA-1	Successful
24 July 2022; 06:22	Wentian	Low Earth (TSS)	CMSA	Space station laboratory cabin module
29 July 2022; 13:28	Long March 2D	Y65	Xichang, LA-3	Successful
29 July 2022; 13:28	Yaogan 35-03A	Low Earth	CAS	Reconnaissance
29 July 2022; 13:28	Yaogan 35-03B	Low Earth	CAS	Reconnaissance
29 July 2022; 13:28	Yaogan 35-03C	Low Earth	CAS	Reconnaissance
4 August 2022; 03:08	Long March 4B	Y40	Taiyuan, LC-9	Successful
4 August 2022; 03:08	TECIS	Low Earth	Ministry of Natural Resources	Earth observation
4 August 2022; 03:08	Minhang Shaonian 'Lingtanxiao Xianfeng'	Low Earth	SAST	Education
4 August 2022; 03:08	Jiaotong-4 (HEAD-2G)	Low Earth	HEAD Aerospace Group	Earth observation
4 August 2022; 03:08	100th consecutive successful launch of a Long March rocket since the Long March 3B launch failure in 2020.			
4 August 2022; ~16:00	Long March 2F/T	2F-T4	Jiuquan SLS-1	Successful
4 August 2022; ~16:00	Reusable Experimental Spacecraft	Low Earth	CASC	Technology demonstration
4 August 2022; ~16:00	Second flight of the Reusable Experimental Spacecraft. Suspected to be a prototype of a spaceplane, but not officially confirmed.			
10 August 2022; 04:50	Long March 6	Y10	Taiyuan, LC-16	Successful
10 August 2022; 04:50	Jilin-1 Gaofen-03D 09 (Xi'an Hangtou-1)	Sun-synchronous	Chang Guang Satellite Technology	Earth observation
10 August 2022; 04:50	Jilin-1 Gaofen-03D 35 (Dongpo-1)	Sun-synchronous	Chang Guang Satellite Technology	Earth observation
10 August 2022; 04:50	Jilin-1 Gaofen-03D 36 (Dongpo-2)	Sun-synchronous	Chang Guang Satellite Technology	Earth observation
10 August 2022; 04:50	Jilin-1 Gaofen-03D 37 (Dongpo-3)	Sun-synchronous	Chang Guang Satellite Technology	Earth observation
10 August 2022; 04:50	Jilin-1 Gaofen-03D 38 (Dongpo-4)	Sun-synchronous	Chang Guang Satellite Technology	Earth observation
10 August 2022; 04:50	Jilin-1 Gaofen-03D 39 (Dongpo-5)	Sun-synchronous	Chang Guang Satellite Technology	Earth observation
10 August 2022; 04:50	Jilin-1 Gaofen-03D 40 (Dongpo-6)	Sun-synchronous	Chang Guang Satellite Technology	Earth observation
10 August 2022; 04:50	Jilin-1 Gaofen-03D 41 (Dongpo-7)	Sun-synchronous	Chang Guang Satellite Technology	Earth observation
10 August 2022; 04:50	Jilin-1 Gaofen-03D 42 (Henan-1)	Sun-synchronous	Chang Guang Satellite Technology	Earth observation
10 August 2022; 04:50	Jilin-1 Gaofen-03D 43 (Puyin-1)	Sun-synchronous	Chang Guang Satellite Technology	Earth observation
10 August 2022; 04:50	Jilin-1 Hongwai-01A 01 (Yunyao-1 04)	Sun-synchronous	Chang Guang Satellite Technology	Earth observation
10 August 2022; 04:50	Jilin-1 Hongwai-01A 02 (Yunyao-1 05)	Sun-synchronous	Chang Guang Satellite Technology	Earth observation
10 August 2022; 04:50	Jilin-1 Hongwai-01A 03 (Yunyao-1 06)	Sun-synchronous	Chang Guang Satellite Technology	Earth observation
10 August 2022; 04:50	Jilin-1 Hongwai-01A 04 (Yunyao-1 07)	Sun-synchronous	Chang Guang Satellite Technology	Earth observation
10 August 2022; 04:50	Jilin-1 Hongwai-01A 05 (Yunyao-1 08)	Sun-synchronous	Chang Guang Satellite Technology	Earth observation
10 August 2022; 04:50	Jilin-1 Hongwai-01A 06 (Tianjin Binhai-1)	Sun-synchronous	Chang Guang Satellite Technology	Earth observation
19 August 2022; 17:37	Long March 2D	Y66	Xichang, LA-3	Successful
19 August 2022; 17:37	Yaogan 35-04A	Low Earth	CAS	Reconnaissance
19 August 2022; 17:37	Yaogan 35-04B	Low Earth	CAS	Reconnaissance
19 August 2022; 17:37	Yaogan 35-04C	Low Earth	CAS	Reconnaissance
24 August 2022; 03:01	Long March 2D	Y75	Taiyuan LA-9	Successful
24 August 2022; 03:01	Beijing-3B	Sun-synchronous	China Spacesat	Earth observation
2 September 2022; 23:44	Long March 4C	Y52	Jiuquan, LA-4/SLS-2	Successful
2 September 2022; 23:44	Yaogan 33-02	Sun-synchronous	CAS	Earth observation
6 September 2022; 04:19	Long March 2D	Y67	Xichang, LA-3	Successful
6 September 2022; 04:19	Yaogan 35-05A	Low Earth	CAS	Reconnaissance
6 September 2022; 04:19	Yaogan 35-05B	Low Earth	CAS	Reconnaissance
6 September 2022; 04:19	Yaogan 35-05C	Low Earth	CAS	Reconnaissance
13 September 2022; 13:18	Long March 7A	Y5	Wenchang LC-2	Successful
13 September 2022; 13:18	ChinaSat 1E	Geostationary transfer	China Satcom	Communication
20 September 2022; 23:15	Long March 2D	Y76	Jiuquan, LA-4/SLS-2	Successful
20 September 2022; 23:15	Yunhai-1 03	Sun-synchronous	SAST	Meteorology
26 September 2022; 13:38	Long March 2D	Y68	Xichang, LA-3	Successful
26 September 2022; 13:38	Yaogan 36-01A	Low Earth	CAS	Reconnaissance
26 September 2022; 13:38	Yaogan 36-01B	Low Earth	CAS	Reconnaissance
26 September 2022; 13:38	Yaogan 36-01C	Low Earth	CAS	Reconnaissance
26 September 2022; 23:50	Long March 6	Y9	Taiyuan, LC-16	Successful
26 September 2022; 23:50	Shiyan 16A	Sun-synchronous	CAST	Technology demonstration
26 September 2022; 23:50	Shiyan 16B	Sun-synchronous	CAST	Technology demonstration
26 September 2022; 23:50	Shiyan 17	Sun-synchronous	CAST	Technology demonstration
7 October 2022; 13:10	Long March 11	F-14	DeFu 15002 converted barge, Yellow Sea (36.23° N, 121.20° E)	Successful
7 October 2022; 13:10	Centispace 1-S5	Low Earth	Beijing Future Navigation Technology	Navigation
7 October 2022; 13:10	Centispace 1-S6	Low Earth	Beijing Future Navigation Technology	Navigation
8 October 2022; 23:43	Long March 2D	Y55	Jiuquan SLS-2	Successful
8 October 2022; 23:43	ASO-S (Kuafu-1)	Sun-synchronous	CAS	Heliophysics
12 October 2022; 22:53	Long March 2C	F-65	Taiyuan LC-9	Successful
12 October 2022; 22:53	S-SAR 01 (Huanjing-2E)	Sun-synchronous	Ministry of Emergency Management	Earth observation
14 October 2022; 19:12	Long March 2D	Y69	Xichang, LA-3	Successful
14 October 2022; 19:12	Yaogan 36-02A	Low Earth	CAS	Reconnaissance
14 October 2022; 19:12	Yaogan 36-02B	Low Earth	CAS	Reconnaissance
14 October 2022; 19:12	Yaogan 36-02C	Low Earth	CAS	Reconnaissance
29 October 2022; 01:01	Long March 2D	Y72	Jiuquan, LA-4/SLS-2	Successful
29 October 2022; 01:01	Shiyan 20C	Low Earth	CAST	Technology demonstration
31 October 2022; 07:37	Long March 5B	F-04	Wenchang LC-1	Successful
31 October 2022; 07:37	Mengtian	Low Earth (TSS)	CMSA	Space station laboratory cabin module
5 November 2022; 11:50	Long March 3B/E	Y91	Xichang, LA-2	Successful
5 November 2022; 11:50	ChinaSat-19	Geostationary transfer	China Satcom	Communication
11 November 2022; 22:52	Long March 6A	F-02	Taiyuan, LA-9A	Successful
11 November 2022; 22:52	Yunhai-3 01	Sun-synchronous	SAST	Meteorology
11 November 2022; 22:52	Breakup of second stage on November 12 ~0525 UTC in approx. 50+ pieces at 500-700 km altitude			
12 November 2022; 02:03	Long March 7	Y6	Wenchang LC-2	Successful
12 November 2022; 02:03	Tianzhou 5	Low Earth (TSS)	CMSA	Space logistics
12 November 2022; 02:03	Macao Science 1 (CAS-10, XW-4)	Low Earth	MUST	South Atlantic Anomaly observation
12 November 2022; 02:03	Gaoxin-1	Low Earth	TBA	TBA
12 November 2022; 02:03	Shengxi Jishu Yanzheng	Low Earth	TBA	Technology demonstration
12 November 2022; 02:03	Fourth cargo flight to the Tiangong Space Station.			
15 November 2022; 01:38	Long March 4C	Y48	Jiuquan, LA-4/SLS-2	Successful
15 November 2022; 01:38	Yaogan 34-03	Low Earth	CAS	Earth observation
27 November 2022; 12:23	Long March 2D	Y89	Xichang, LA-3	Successful
27 November 2022; 12:23	Yaogan 36-03A	Low Earth	CAS	Reconnaissance
27 November 2022; 12:23	Yaogan 36-03B	Low Earth	CAS	Reconnaissance
27 November 2022; 12:23	Yaogan 36-03C	Low Earth	CAS	Reconnaissance
29 November 2022; 15:08	Long March 2F/G	Y15	Jiuquan SLS-1	Successful
29 November 2022; 15:08	Shenzhou 15	Low Earth (TSS)	CMSA	Crewed spaceflight
29 November 2022; 15:08	Fourth crewed flight to the Tiangong space station.			
8 December 2022; 18:31	Long March 2D	Y45	Taiyuan LA-9	Successful
8 December 2022; 18:31	Gaofen 5-01A	Sun-synchronous	CNSA	Earth observation
12 December 2022; 08:22	Long March 4C	Y47	Jiuquan, LA-4/SLS-2	Successful
12 December 2022; 08:22	Shiyan 20A	Low Earth	CAST	Technology demonstration
12 December 2022; 08:22	Shiyan 20B	Low Earth	CAST	Technology demonstration
14 December 2022; 18:25	Long March 2D	Y80	Xichang, LA-3	Successful
14 December 2022; 18:25	Yaogan 36-04A	Low Earth	CAS	Reconnaissance
14 December 2022; 18:25	Yaogan 36-04B	Low Earth	CAS	Reconnaissance
14 December 2022; 18:25	Yaogan 36-04C	Low Earth	CAS	Reconnaissance
16 December 2022; 06:17	Long March 11	F-12	Xichang	Successful
16 December 2022; 06:17	Shiyan 21	Low Earth	CAST	Technology demonstration
27 December 2022; 07:37	Long March 4B	F-47	Taiyuan, LC-9	Successful
27 December 2022; 07:37	Gaofen 11-04	Sun-synchronous	CNSA	Earth observation
29 December 2022; 04:43	Long March 3B/E	Y88	Xichang, LA-2	Successful
29 December 2022; 04:43	Shiyan 10-02	Geostationary transfer	SAST	Technology demonstration

=== 2023 ===
Date/time (UTC)	Rocket	Serial number	Launch site	Outcome
Date/time (UTC)	Payload	Separation orbit	Operator	Function
Date/time (UTC)	Remarks			
8 January 2023; 22:00	Long March 7A	Y4	Wenchang, LC-2	Successful
8 January 2023; 22:00	Shijian-23	Geostationary transfer	SAST	Technology demonstration
12 January 2023; 18:10	Long March 2C	Y61	Xichang, LA-3	Successful
12 January 2023; 18:10	Apstar 6E	Geostationary transfer	APT Satellite Holdings	Communications
13 January 2023; 07:00	Long March 2D	Y73	Jiuquan, SLS-2	Successful
13 January 2023; 07:00	Yaogan 37	Low Earth	CAS	Reconnaissance
13 January 2023; 07:00	Shiyan 22A	Low Earth	SAST	Technology demonstration
13 January 2023; 07:00	Shiyan 22B	Low Earth	SAST	Technology demonstration
15 January 2023; 03:14	Long March 2D	Y71	Taiyuan, LC-9	Successful
15 January 2023; 03:14	Beiyou-1	Sun-synchronous	BUPT	Technology demonstration
15 January 2023; 03:14	Jilin-1 Gaofen-03D 34	Sun-synchronous	Chang Guang Satellite Technology	Earth observation
15 January 2023; 03:14	Jilin-1 Hongwai-01A 07	Sun-synchronous	Chang Guang Satellite Technology	Earth observation
15 January 2023; 03:14	Jilin-1 Hongwai-01A 08	Sun-synchronous	Chang Guang Satellite Technology	Earth observation
15 January 2023; 03:14	Jilin-1 Mofang-02A 03	Sun-synchronous	Chang Guang Satellite Technology	Earth observation
15 January 2023; 03:14	Jilin-1 Mofang-02A 04	Sun-synchronous	Chang Guang Satellite Technology	Earth observation
15 January 2023; 03:14	Jilin-1 Mofang-02A 07	Sun-synchronous	Chang Guang Satellite Technology	Earth observation
15 January 2023; 03:14	Luojia-3 01 (Yantai-1)	Sun-synchronous	Wuhan University / DHF Satellite Co.	Earth observation
15 January 2023; 03:14	Qilu-2	Sun-synchronous	SDIIT	Earth observation
15 January 2023; 03:14	Qilu-3	Sun-synchronous	SDIIT	Earth observation
15 January 2023; 03:14	Rizhao-3 (Tianzhi-2D)	Sun-synchronous	CAS	Technology demonstration
15 January 2023; 03:14	Golden Bauhinia-3	Sun-synchronous	Hong Kong Aerospace Science & Technology	Earth observation
15 January 2023; 03:14	Golden Bauhinia-4	Sun-synchronous	Hong Kong Aerospace Science & Technology	Earth observation
15 January 2023; 03:14	Golden Bauhinia-6	Sun-synchronous	Hong Kong Aerospace Science & Technology	Earth observation
15 January 2023; 03:14	Long March Express 3 mission.			
23 February 2023; 11:49	Long March 3B/E	Y93	Xichang, LA-2	Successful
23 February 2023; 11:49	ChinaSat 26	Geostationary transfer	China Satcom	Communication
24 February 2023; 04:01	Long March 2C	Y63	Jiuquan, SLS-2	Successful
24 February 2023; 04:01	Horus-1	Sun-synchronous	Egyptian Space Agency	Earth observation
9 March 2023; 22:41	Long March 4C	Y51	Taiyuan, LC-9	Successful
9 March 2023; 22:41	Tianhui 6A	Sun-synchronous	CNSA	Earth observation
9 March 2023; 22:41	Tianhui 6B	Sun-synchronous	CNSA	Earth observation
13 March 2023; 04:02	Long March 2C	Y64	Jiuquan, SLS-2	Successful
13 March 2023; 04:02	Horus-2	Sun-synchronous	Egyptian Space Agency	Earth observation
15 March 2023; 11:41	Long March 11	Y11	Jiuquan	Successful
15 March 2023; 11:41	Shiyan 19	Sun-synchronous	SAST	Technology demonstration
17 March 2023; 08:33	Long March 3B/E	Y90	Xichang, LA-2	Successful
17 March 2023; 08:33	Gaofen 13-02	Geostationary transfer	SASTIND	Earth observation
30 March 2023; 10:50	Long March 2D	Y90	Taiyuan, LC-9	Successful
30 March 2023; 10:50	PIESAT-1A 01	Sun-synchronous	PIESAT	Earth observation
30 March 2023; 10:50	PIESAT-1B 01	Sun-synchronous	PIESAT	Earth observation
30 March 2023; 10:50	PIESAT-1B 02	Sun-synchronous	PIESAT	Earth observation
30 March 2023; 10:50	PIESAT-1B 03	Sun-synchronous	PIESAT	Earth observation
31 March 2023; 06:27	Long March 4C	Y49	Jiuquan, SLS-2	Successful
31 March 2023; 06:27	Yaogan 34-04	Low Earth	CAS	Reconnaissance
16 April 2023; 01:36	Long March 4B	Y51	Jiuquan, SLS-2	Successful
16 April 2023; 01:36	Fengyun 3G	Low Earth	CMA	Meteorology
10 May 2023; 13:22	Long March 7	Y7	Wenchang LC-2	Successful
10 May 2023; 13:22	Tianzhou 6	Low Earth (TSS)	CMSA	Space logistics
10 May 2023; 13:22	Dalian-1 Lianli	Low Earth (TSS)	Dalian University of Technology	Earth observation
10 May 2023; 13:22	Fifth cargo flight to the Tiangong Space Station.			
17 May 2023; 02:49	Long March 3B/E	Y87	Xichang, LA-2	Successful
17 May 2023; 02:49	BeiDou-3 G4	Geostationary transfer	CNSA	Communication
21 May 2023; 08:00	Long March 2C	Y60	Jiuquan, SLS-2	Successful
21 May 2023; 08:00	Luojia-2 01	Low Earth	Wuhan University	Earth observation
21 May 2023; 08:00	Macau Science-1 A	Low Earth	MUST	Earth observation
21 May 2023; 08:00	Macau Science-1 B	Low Earth	MUST	Earth observation
30 May 2023; 01:31	Long March 2F/G	Y16	Jiuquan SLS-1	Successful
30 May 2023; 01:31	Shenzhou 16	Low Earth (TSS)	CMSA	Crewed spaceflight
30 May 2023; 01:31	Fifth crewed flight to the Tiangong space station.			
15 June 2023; 05:30	Long March 2D	Y88	Taiyuan, LC-9	Successful
15 June 2023; 05:30	Jilin-1 x 41 satellites	Sun-synchronous	Chang Guang Satellite Technology	Earth observation
15 June 2023; 05:30	The rocket carried a total of 41 satellites, setting a new record for Chinese launch vehicles.			
20 June 2023; 03:18	Long March 6	Y12	Taiyuan, LC-16	Successful
20 June 2023; 03:18	Shiyan 25	Sun-synchronous	SAST	Technology demonstration
9 July 2023; 11:00	Long March 2C + YZ-1S	Y52	Jiuquan, LA-4/SLS-2	Successful
9 July 2023; 11:00	Hulianwang Jishu Shiyan 1A	Low Earth	CAS	Communication
9 July 2023; 11:00	Hulianwang Jishu Shiyan 1B	Low Earth	CAS	Communication
23 July 2023; 02:50	Long March 2D	Y91	Taiyuan, LC-9	Successful
23 July 2023; 02:50	Lingxi-03	Low Earth	Galaxy Space	Communications
23 July 2023; 02:50	Skysight AS-01	Low Earth	Skysight	Earth observation
23 July 2023; 02:50	Skysight AS-02	Low Earth	Skysight	Earth observation
23 July 2023; 02:50	Skysight AS-03	Low Earth	Skysight	Earth observation
26 July 2023; 20:02	Long March 2D	Y81	Xichang, LA-3	Successful
26 July 2023; 20:02	Yaogan 36-05A	Low Earth	CAS	Reconnaissance
26 July 2023; 20:02	Yaogan 36-05B	Low Earth	CAS	Reconnaissance
26 July 2023; 20:02	Yaogan 36-05C	Low Earth	CAS	Reconnaissance
3 August 2023; 03:47	Long March 4C	Y44	Jiuquan, SLS-2	Successful
3 August 2023; 03:47	Fengyun 3F	Sun-synchronous	CMA	Meteorology
8 August 2023; 22:53	Long March 2C	Y46	Taiyuan LC-9	Successful
8 August 2023; 22:53	S-SAR 02 (Huanjing-2F)	Sun-synchronous	Ministry of Emergency Management	Earth observation
12 August 2023; 17:26	Long March 3B/E	Y92	Xichang, LA-2	Successful
12 August 2023; 17:26	Ludi Tance-4 01A	Geostationary transfer	Ministry of Natural Resources	Earth observation
12 August 2023; 17:26	World’s first SAR satellite in (inclined) geosynchronous orbit.			
20 August 2023; 17:45	Long March 4C	Y56	Jiuquan, LA-4/SLS-2	Successful
20 August 2023; 17:45	Gaofen 12-04	Sun-synchronous	CNSA	Earth observation
31 August 2023; 07:36	Long March 2D	Y82	Xichang, LA-3	Successful
31 August 2023; 07:36	Yaogan 39-01A	Low Earth	CAS	Reconnaissance
31 August 2023; 07:36	Yaogan 39-01B	Low Earth	CAS	Reconnaissance
31 August 2023; 07:36	Yaogan 39-01C	Low Earth	CAS	Reconnaissance
6 September 2023; 18:14	Long March 4C	Y53	Jiuquan, LA-4/SLS-2	Successful
6 September 2023; 18:14	Yaogan 33-03	Sun-synchronous	CAS	Earth observation
10 September 2023; 04:30	Long March 6A	Y5	Taiyuan, LA-9A	Successful
10 September 2023; 04:30	Yaogan 40A	Low Earth	CAS	ELINT
10 September 2023; 04:30	Yaogan 40B	Low Earth	CAS	ELINT
10 September 2023; 04:30	Yaogan 40C	Low Earth	CAS	ELINT
17 September 2023; 04:13	Long March 2D	Y83	Xichang, LA-3	Successful
17 September 2023; 04:13	Yaogan 39-02A	Low Earth	CAS	Reconnaissance
17 September 2023; 04:13	Yaogan 39-02B	Low Earth	CAS	Reconnaissance
17 September 2023; 04:13	Yaogan 39-02C	Low Earth	CAS	Reconnaissance
26 September 2023; 20:15	Long March 4C	Y54	Jiuquan, LA-4/SLS-2	Successful
26 September 2023; 20:15	Yaogan 33-04	Sun-synchronous	CAS	Earth observation
5 October 2023; 00:24	Long March 2D	Y84	Xichang, LA-3	Successful
5 October 2023; 00:24	Yaogan 39-03A	Low Earth	CAS	Reconnaissance
5 October 2023; 00:24	Yaogan 39-03B	Low Earth	CAS	Reconnaissance
5 October 2023; 00:24	Yaogan 39-03C	Low Earth	CAS	Reconnaissance
15 October 2023; 00:54	Long March 2D	Y77	Jiuquan, LA-4/SLS-2	Successful
15 October 2023; 00:54	Yunhai-1 04	Sun-synchronous	SAST	Meteorology
23 October 2023; 20:03	Long March 2D	Y85	Xichang, LA-3	Successful
23 October 2023; 20:03	Yaogan 39-04A	Low Earth	CAS	Reconnaissance
23 October 2023; 20:03	Yaogan 39-04B	Low Earth	CAS	Reconnaissance
23 October 2023; 20:03	Yaogan 39-04C	Low Earth	CAS	Reconnaissance
26 October 2023; 03:14	Long March 2F/G	Y17	Jiuquan SLS-1	Successful
26 October 2023; 03:14	Shenzhou 17	Low Earth (TSS)	CMSA	Crewed spaceflight
26 October 2023; 03:14	Sixth crewed flight to the Tiangong space station.			
31 October 2023; 22:50	Long March 6A	Y4	Taiyuan, LA-9A	Successful
31 October 2023; 22:50	Tianhui 5A	Sun-synchronous	CNSA	Earth observation
31 October 2023; 22:50	Tianhui 5B	Sun-synchronous	CNSA	Earth observation
3 November 2023; 14:54	Long March 7A	Y6	Wenchang LC-2	Successful
3 November 2023; 14:54	TJS-10	Geosynchronous	SAST	Technology demonstration
9 November 2023; 11:23	Long March 3B/E	Y94	Xichang, LA-2	Successful
9 November 2023; 11:23	ChinaSat 6E	Geostationary transfer	China Satcom	Communication
16 November 2023; 03:55	Long March 2C + YZ-1S	Y56	Jiuquan, LA-4/SLS-2	Successful
16 November 2023; 03:55	Haiyang-3A	Low Earth	Ministry of Natural Resources	Oceanography
23 November 2023; 10:00	Long March 2D + YZ-3	Y59	Xichang, LA-3	Successful
23 November 2023; 10:00	Hulianwang Jishu Shiyan 2A	Low Earth	CAS	Communication
23 November 2023; 10:00	Hulianwang Jishu Shiyan 2B	Low Earth	CAS	Communication
23 November 2023; 10:00	Hulianwang Jishu Shiyan 2C	Low Earth	CAS	Communication
4 December 2023; 04:10	Long March 2C	Y54	Jiuquan, LA-4/SLS-2	Successful
4 December 2023; 04:10	MisrSat-2	Sun-synchronous	Egyptian Space Agency	Earth observation
4 December 2023; 04:10	Xingchi-2A	Sun-synchronous	Ellipse SpaceTime	Earth observation
4 December 2023; 04:10	Xingchi-2B	Sun-synchronous	Ellipse SpaceTime	Earth observation
10 December 2023; 01:58	Long March 2D	Y86	Xichang, LA-3	Successful
10 December 2023; 01:58	Yaogan 39-05A	Low Earth	CAS	Reconnaissance
10 December 2023; 01:58	Yaogan 39-05B	Low Earth	CAS	Reconnaissance
10 December 2023; 01:58	Yaogan 39-05C	Low Earth	CAS	Reconnaissance
10 December 2023; 01:58	The 500th launch of the Long March series rocket.			
14 December 2023; ~14:10	Long March 2F/T	2F-T5	Jiuquan SLS-1	Successful
14 December 2023; ~14:10	Reusable Experimental Spacecraft	Low Earth	CASC	Technology demonstration
14 December 2023; ~14:10	Third flight of the Reusable Experimental Spacecraft. Suspected to be a prototype of a spaceplane, but not officially confirmed.			
15 December 2023; 13:41	Long March 5	Y6	Wenchang LC-1	Successful
15 December 2023; 13:41	Yaogan 41	Geosynchronous	CASC	Earth observation
25 December 2023; 22:40	Long March 11H	HY5	Bo Run Jiu Zhou platform, South China Sea	Successful
25 December 2023; 22:40	Shiyan 24C-01	Sun-sunchronous	SAST	Technology demonstration
25 December 2023; 22:40	Shiyan 24C-02	Sun-sunchronous	SAST	Technology demonstration
25 December 2023; 22:40	Shiyan 24C-03	Sun-sunchronous	SAST	Technology demonstration
26 December 2023; 03:26	Long March 3B/E + YZ-1	Y75	Xichang, LA-2	Successful
26 December 2023; 03:26	BeiDou-3 M25	Medium Earth	CNSA	Communication
26 December 2023; 03:26	BeiDou-3 M26	Medium Earth	CNSA	Communication
30 December 2023; 00:13	Long March 2C + YZ-1S	Y73	Jiuquan, LA-4/SLS-2	Successful
30 December 2023; 00:13	Hulianwang Jishu Shiyan 4A	Low Earth	CAS	Communication
30 December 2023; 00:13	Hulianwang Jishu Shiyan 4B	Low Earth	CAS	Communication
30 December 2023; 00:13	Hulianwang Jishu Shiyan 4C	Low Earth	CAS	Communication

=== 2024 ===
Date/time (UTC)	Rocket	Serial number	Launch site	Outcome
Date/time (UTC)	Payload	Separation orbit	Operator	Function
Date/time (UTC)	Remarks			
9 January 2024; 07:03	Long March 2C	Y30	Xichang, LA-3	Successful
9 January 2024; 07:03	Einstein Probe	Low Earth	CAS / ESA	X-ray astronomy
17 January 2024; 14:27	Long March 7	Y8	Wenchang, LC-2	Successful
17 January 2024; 14:27	Tianzhou 7	Low Earth (TSS)	CNSA	Space logistics
17 January 2024; 14:27	Nanjing (Baiyi-08)	Low Earth	NJIT	Earth observation
17 January 2024; 14:27	Sixth cargo flight to the Tiangong Space Station.			
2 February 2024; 23:37	Long March 2C	Y85	Xichang, LA-3	Successful
2 February 2024; 23:37	GeeSAT-2 01	Low Earth	Geespace	Navigation communications
2 February 2024; 23:37	GeeSAT-2 02	Low Earth	Geespace	Navigation communications
2 February 2024; 23:37	GeeSAT-2 03	Low Earth	Geespace	Navigation communications
2 February 2024; 23:37	GeeSAT-2 04	Low Earth	Geespace	Navigation communications
2 February 2024; 23:37	GeeSAT-2 05	Low Earth	Geespace	Navigation communications
2 February 2024; 23:37	GeeSAT-2 06	Low Earth	Geespace	Navigation communications
2 February 2024; 23:37	GeeSAT-2 07	Low Earth	Geespace	Navigation communications
2 February 2024; 23:37	GeeSAT-2 08	Low Earth	Geespace	Navigation communications
2 February 2024; 23:37	GeeSAT-2 09	Low Earth	Geespace	Navigation communications
2 February 2024; 23:37	GeeSAT-2 10	Low Earth	Geespace	Navigation communications
2 February 2024; 23:37	GeeSAT-2 11	Low Earth	Geespace	Navigation communications
23 February 2024; 11:30	Long March 5	Y7	Wenchang, LC-1	Successful
23 February 2024; 11:30	TJS-11	Geosynchronous	CASC	Communications; Technology demonstration
29 February 2024; 13:03	Long March 3B/E	Y95	Xichang, LA-2	Successful
29 February 2024; 13:03	Weixing Hulianwang Gaogui-01	Geostationary transfer	CASC	Communications
13 March 2024; 12:51	Long March 2C + YZ-1S	Y86	Xichang, LA-3	Partial failure
13 March 2024; 12:51	DRO-A	Selenocentric (DRO)	CAS	Technology demonstration
13 March 2024; 12:51	DRO-B	Selenocentric (DRO)	CAS	Technology demonstration
13 March 2024; 12:51	Upper stage failure placed DRO-A and DRO-B in orbits short of geostaiontary transfer orbit; satellites eventually reached GTO and subsequentely inserted into their intended DRO working orbits about the Moon under their own power.			
20 March 2024; 00:31	Long March 8	Y3	Wenchang, LC-2	Successful
20 March 2024; 00:31	Queqiao-2	Selenocentric	CNSA	Communications
20 March 2024; 00:31	Tiandu-1	Selenocentric	Deep Space Exploration Laboratory	Technology demonstration
20 March 2024; 00:31	Tiandu-2	Selenocentric	Deep Space Exploration Laboratory	Technology demonstration
20 March 2024; 00:31	Queqiao-2 is the relay satellite for the successive Chang'e 6, Chang'e 7 and Chang'e 8 missions. Tiandu 1 and 2 will test technologies for a future lunar navigation and positioning constellation.			
21 March 2024; 05:27	Long March 2D + YZ-3	Y87	Jiuquan, SLS-2	Successful
21 March 2024; 05:27	Yunhai-2 07	Low Earth	CAST	Meteorology
21 March 2024; 05:27	Yunhai-2 08	Low Earth	CAST	Meteorology
21 March 2024; 05:27	Yunhai-2 09	Low Earth	CAST	Meteorology
21 March 2024; 05:27	Yunhai-2 10	Low Earth	CAST	Meteorology
21 March 2024; 05:27	Yunhai-2 11	Low Earth	CAST	Meteorology
21 March 2024; 05:27	Yunhai-2 12	Low Earth	CAST	Meteorology
26 March 2024; 22:51	Long March 6A	Y3	Taiyuan, LA-9A	Successful
26 March 2024; 22:51	Yunhai-3 02	Sun-synchronous	SAST	Earth observation
2 April 2024; 22:56	Long March 2D	Y102	Xichang, LA-3	Successful
2 April 2024; 22:56	Yaogan 42-01	Low Earth	SAST	Earth observation
15 April 2024; 04:12	Long March 2D	Y97	Jiuquan, SLS-2	Successful
15 April 2024; 04:12	Siwei Gaojing 3-01	Sun-synchronous	China Siwei	Earth observation
20 April 2024; 23:45	Long March 2D	Y103	Xichang, LA-	Successful
20 April 2024; 23:45	Yaogan 42-02	Low Earth	SAST	Earth observation
25 April 2024; 12:59	Long March 2F/G	Y18	Jiuquan SLS-1	Successful
25 April 2024; 12:59	Shenzhou 18	Low Earth (TSS)	CMSA	Crewed spaceflight
25 April 2024; 12:59	Seventh crewed flight to the Tiangong space station.			
3 May 2024; 09:27	Long March 5	Y8	Wenchang LC-1	Successful
3 May 2024; 09:27	Chang'e 6	Lunar transfer	CNSA	Lunar Sample Return
3 May 2024; 09:27	China's second lunar sample return mission, and world's first from the far side of the Moon, targeting southern area of Apollo basin (~43º S, 154º W). The mission is expected to take 53 days from launch to return module touchdown.			
7 May 2024; 13:21	Long March 6C	Y1	Taiyuan, LA-9A	Successful
7 May 2024; 13:21	Haiwangxing-1	Sun-synchronous	Zhihui Space Tech	SAR satellite (X-band)
7 May 2024; 13:21	Zhixing-1C	Sun-synchronous	Smart Satellite	SAR satellite
7 May 2024; 13:21	Kuanfu Guangxue Weixing	Sun-synchronous	Harbin Institute of Technology	Earth observation
7 May 2024; 13:21	Gaofen Shipin Weixing	Sun-synchronous	Harbin Institute of Technology	Earth observation
7 May 2024; 13:21	Maiden launch of the Long March 6C variant			
9 May 2024; 01:43	Long March 3B/E	Y97	Xichang, LA-2	Successful
9 May 2024; 01:43	Smart Skynet 1-01A	Medium Earth	SAST	Communication
9 May 2024; 01:43	Smart Skynet 1-01B	Medium Earth	SAST	Communication
11 May 2024; 23:43	Long March 4C	Y50	Jiuquan, SLS-2	Successful
11 May 2024; 23:43	Shiyan 23	Sun-synchronous	SAST	Technology demonstration
20 May 2024; 03:06	Long March 2D	Y98	Taiyuan, LA-9	Successful
20 May 2024; 03:06	Beijing-3C 01	Sun-synchronous	Twenty First Century Aerospace Technology Company Ltd	Earth observation
20 May 2024; 03:06	Beijing-3C 02	Sun-synchronous	Twenty First Century Aerospace Technology Company Ltd	Earth observation
20 May 2024; 03:06	Beijing-3C 03	Sun-synchronous	Twenty First Century Aerospace Technology Company Ltd	Earth observation
20 May 2024; 03:06	Beijing-3C 04	Sun-synchronous	Twenty First Century Aerospace Technology Company Ltd	Earth observation
30 May 2024; 12:12	Long March 3B/E	Y96	Xichang, LA-2	Successful
30 May 2024; 12:12	PakSat-MM1R	Geosynchronous	SUPARCO	Communication
22 June 2024; 00:00	Long March 2C	Y50	Xichang LA-3	Successful
22 June 2024; 00:00	SVOM / CATCH-1	Low Earth	CNSA / CNES	X-ray astronomy
29 June 2024; 11:57	Long March 7A		Wenchang, LC-2	Successful
29 June 2024; 11:57	Zhongxing-3A	Geostationary transfer	CNSA	Communications
4 July 2024; 22:49	Long March 6A		Taiyuan	Successful
4 July 2024; 22:49	Tianhui-5 2-01	Low Earth	CNSA	Radar?
4 July 2024; 22:49	Tianhui-5 2-02	Low Earth	CNSA	Radar?
19 July 2024; 03:03	Long March 4B		Taiyuan	Successful
19 July 2024; 03:03	Gao Fen 11-05	Low Earth	CNSA	Earth observation
1 August 2024; 13:14	Long March 3B		Xichang LC-2	Successful
1 August 2024; 13:14	Hulianwang gaogui 02	Geostationary transfer	CNSA	Communications
6 August 2024; 06:42	Long March 6A		Taiyuan LA-9A	Successful
6 August 2024; 06:42	Qianfan Jigui 01 zu (18 satellites)	Polar	Shanghai Spacecom Satellite Technology	Communications
6 August 2024; 06:42	Initial batch of 18 satellites for the Qianfan megaconstellation			
16 August 2024; 07:35	Long March 4B		Xichang	Successful
16 August 2024; 07:35	Yaogan 43-01-01	Low Earth	CNSA	Communications?
16 August 2024; 07:35	Yaogan 43-01-02	Low Earth	CNSA	Communications?
16 August 2024; 07:35	Yaogan 43-01-03	Low Earth	CNSA	Communications?
16 August 2024; 07:35	Yaogan 43-01-04	Low Earth	CNSA	Communications?
16 August 2024; 07:35	Yaogan 43-01-05	Low Earth	CNSA	Communications?
16 August 2024; 07:35	Yaogan 43-01-06	Low Earth	CNSA	Communications?
16 August 2024; 07:35	Yaogan 43-01-07	Low Earth	CNSA	Communications?
16 August 2024; 07:35	Yaogan 43-01-08	Low Earth	CNSA	Communications?
16 August 2024; 07:35	Yaogan 43-01-09	Low Earth	CNSA	Communications?
22 August 2024; 12:25	Long March 7A		Xichang	Successful
22 August 2024; 12:25	ZX-4A	Geostationary transfer	CNSA	Communications
3 September 2024; 01:15	Long March 4B		Xichang	Successful
3 September 2024; 01:15	Yaogan 43-02 01	Low Earth	CNSA	Communications?
3 September 2024; 01:15	Yaogan 43-02 02	Low Earth	CNSA	Communications?
3 September 2024; 01:15	Yaogan 43-02 03	Low Earth	CNSA	Communications?
3 September 2024; 01:15	Yaogan 43-02 04	Low Earth	CNSA	Communications?
3 September 2024; 01:15	Yaogan 43-02 05	Low Earth	CNSA	Communications?
3 September 2024; 01:15	Yaogan 43-02 06	Low Earth	CNSA	Communications?
5 September 2024; 18:30	Long March 6		Taiyuan	Successful
5 September 2024; 18:30	Geely Group 03 01	Low Earth	Geely	Communications
5 September 2024; 18:30	Geely Group 03 02	Low Earth	Geely	Communications
5 September 2024; 18:30	Geely Group 03 03	Low Earth	Geely	Communications
5 September 2024; 18:30	Geely Group 03 04	Low Earth	Geely	Communications
5 September 2024; 18:30	Geely Group 03 05	Low Earth	Geely	Communications
5 September 2024; 18:30	Geely Group 03 06	Low Earth	Geely	Communications
5 September 2024; 18:30	Geely Group 03 07	Low Earth	Geely	Communications
5 September 2024; 18:30	Geely Group 03 08	Low Earth	Geely	Communications
5 September 2024; 18:30	Geely Group 03 09	Low Earth	Geely	Communications
5 September 2024; 18:30	Geely Group 03 10	Low Earth	Geely	Communications
19 September 2024; 01:14	Long March 3B		Xichang	Successful
19 September 2024; 01:14	Beidou-3 M25	MEO		Navigation; Communications
19 September 2024; 01:14	Beidou-3 M27	MEO		Navigation; Communications
20 September 2024; 04:11	Long March 2D		Taiyuan	Successful
20 September 2024; 04:11	Jilin-1 Kuanfu 02B-01	Sun-synchronous		Earth observation
20 September 2024; 04:11	Jilin-1 Kuanfu 02B 02	Sun-synchronous		Earth observation
20 September 2024; 04:11	Jilin-1 Kuanfu 02B 03	Sun-synchronous		Earth observation
20 September 2024; 04:11	Jilin-1 Kuanfu 02B 04	Sun-synchronous		Earth observation
20 September 2024; 04:11	Jilin-1 Kuanfu 02B 05	Sun-synchronous		Earth observation
20 September 2024; 04:11	Jilin-1 Kuanfu 02B 06	Sun-synchronous		Earth observation
27 September 2024; 10:30	Long March 2D		Jiuquan	Successful
27 September 2024; 10:30	Shijian-19	Low Earth		Recoverable uncrewed spacecraft (life sciences)
10 October 2024; 13:50	Long March 3B		Xichang	Successful
10 October 2024; 13:50	Hulianwang Gaogui-03 "Weixing" (i.e. satellite)	Geostationary transfer	CNSA	Communications
15 October 2024; 11:06	Long March 6A		Taiyuan LA-9A	Successful
15 October 2024; 11:06	Qianfan Jigui 02A-R (18 satellites)	Polar	Shanghai Spacecom Satellite Technology	Communications
15 October 2024; 11:06	Second batch of 18 satellites for the Qianfan megaconstellation			
15 October 2024; 23:45	Long March 4C		Jiuquan	Successful
15 October 2024; 23:45	Gao Fen 12-05	Sun-synchronous	CNSA	Earth observation
22 October 2024; 08:10	Long March 6		Taiyuan	Successful
22 October 2024; 08:10	Tianping-3A(01)	Sun-synchronous		Radar calibration
22 October 2024; 08:10	Tianping-3B(01)	Sun-synchronous		Radar calibration
22 October 2024; 08:10	Tianping-3B(02)	Sun-synchronous		Radar calibration
23 October 2024; 01:09	Long March 2C	Y82	Xichang, LA-3	Successful
23 October 2024; 01:09	Yaogan-43 03A	Low Earth		Earth observation
23 October 2024; 01:09	Yaogan-43 03B	Low Earth		Earth observation
23 October 2024; 01:09	Yaogan-43 03C	Low Earth		Earth observation
29 October 2024; 20:27:34	Long March 2F	Y19	Jiuquan SLS-1	Successful
29 October 2024; 20:27:34	Shenzhou 19	Low Earth (TSS)	CMSA	Crewed spaceflight
29 October 2024; 20:27:34	Eighth crewed flight to the Tiangong space station.			
9 November 2024; 3:39	Long March 2C		Jiuquan	Successful
9 November 2024; 3:39	PIESAT-2 01	Sun-synchronous	Zhuzhou Space Interstellar Satellite Technology Co., Ltd.	Earth observation/Radar
9 November 2024; 3:39	PIESAT-2 02	Sun-synchronous	Zhuzhou Space Interstellar Satellite Technology Co., Ltd.	Earth observation/Radar
9 November 2024; 3:39	PIESAT-2 03	Sun-synchronous	Zhuzhou Space Interstellar Satellite Technology Co., Ltd.	Earth observation/Radar
9 November 2024; 3:39	PIESAT-2 04	Sun-synchronous	Zhuzhou Space Interstellar Satellite Technology Co., Ltd.	Earth observation/Radar
9 November 2024; 3:39	Part of 16-satellites constellation of X-band radar satellites for SAR imaging			
13 November 2024; 22:42	Long March 4B		Taiyuan	Successful
13 November 2024; 22:42	Haiyang 4-01	Sun-synchronous	CNSA	Earth observation
13 November 2024; 22:42	Measures ocean salinity			
15 November 2024; 15:13:18	Long March 7	Y9	Wenchang, LC-2	Successful
15 November 2024; 15:13:18	Tianzhou 8	Low Earth (TSS)	CNSA	Space logistics
15 November 2024; 15:13:18	Seventh cargo flight to the Tiangong Space Station.			
24 November 2024; 23:39	Long March 2C	Y83	Jiuquan	Successful
24 November 2024; 23:39	Siwei Gaojing-2 03	Sun-synchronous	China Siwei	Earth observation/Radar (SAR)
24 November 2024; 23:39	Siwei Gaojing-2 04	Sun-synchronous	China Siwei	Earth observation/Radar (SAR)
24 November 2024; 23:39	Part of 28 satellites constellation consisting of 16 high resolution and 8 wide-width optical satellites and 8 SAR satellites (0.5 metre resolution).			
30 November 2024; 14:25	Long March 12	Y1	Hainan International Commercial Aerospace Launch Site	Successful
30 November 2024; 14:25	Weixing Hulianwang Jishu Shiyan	Low Earth		Satellite internet technology test satellite
30 November 2024; 14:25	Jishu Shiyan 03	Low Earth		Technology test satellite
30 November 2024; 14:25	Maiden launch of CZ-12 and first launch from the Hainan Int'l Commercial Aerospace Launch Site.			
3 December 2024; 05:56	Long March 3B	Y103	Xichang LC-3	Successful
3 December 2024; 05:56	Tongxin Jishu Shiyan-13	Geostationary transfer		Communications/Experimental
5 December 2024; 04:41	Long March 6A	Y22	Taiyuan LA-9A	Successful
5 December 2024; 04:41	Qianfan Jigui 03 (18 satellites)	Polar	Shanghai Spacecom Satellite Technology	Communications
5 December 2024; 04:41	Third batch of 18 satellites for the Qianfan megaconstellation			
12 December 2024; 07:17	Long March 2D + YZ-3	Y60-Y5	Jiuquan, SLS-2	Successful
12 December 2024; 07:17	Gaosu Jiguang Zuanshi (高速激光钻石) 01	Low Earth	CAST	Communications; Technology demonstration
12 December 2024; 07:17	Gaosu Jiguang Zuanshi 02	Low Earth	CAST	Communications; Technology demonstration
12 December 2024; 07:17	Gaosu Jiguang Zuanshi 03	Low Earth	CAST	Communications; Technology demonstration
12 December 2024; 07:17	Gaosu Jiguang Zuanshi 04	Low Earth	CAST	Communications; Technology demonstration
12 December 2024; 07:17	Gaosu Jiguang Zuanshi 05	Low Earth	CAST	Communications; Technology demonstration
12 December 2024; 07:17	Five flat-panel laser-communications test satellites placed in three different orbital planes			
16 December 2024; 10:00	Long March 5B + YZ-2	Y6 + Y2	Wenchang LC-1	Successful
16 December 2024; 10:00	Weixing Huliangwang Digui Group 01 (01-10)	Polar	China Satellite Network Group Co., Ltd. (China SatNet)	Communications
16 December 2024; 10:00	First 10 satellites for the "Guowang" broadband communications megaconstellation expected to eventually number about 13,000.			
16 December 2024; 18:50	Long March 2D	Y99	Taiyuan	Successful
16 December 2024; 18:50	Hongtu-2 09 宏图二号09 (中原二号)	Sun-synchronous	Zhuzhou Space Interstellar Satellite Technology Co., Ltd.	Earth observation/SAR
16 December 2024; 18:50	Hongtu-2 10 宏图二号10 (水利一号)	Sun-synchronous	Zhuzhou Space Interstellar Satellite Technology Co., Ltd.	Earth observation/SAR
16 December 2024; 18:50	Hongtu-2 11 (Huanggang-1) 宏图二号11 (黄冈一号)	Sun-synchronous	Zhuzhou Space Interstellar Satellite Technology Co., Ltd.	Earth observation/SAR
16 December 2024; 18:50	Hongtu-2 12 (Huanggang-2) 宏图二号12 (黄冈二号)	Sun-synchronous	Zhuzhou Space Interstellar Satellite Technology Co., Ltd.	Earth observation/SAR
16 December 2024; 18:50	Also known as PIESAT-2 (see 9 November 2024 CZ-2C launch). Part of 16-satellites constellation of X-band radar satellites for SAR imaging			
20 December 2024; 15:12	Long March 3B	Y99	Xichang LC-2	Successful
20 December 2024; 15:12	Tongxin Jishu Shiyan-12	Geostationary transfer	CNSA	Communications
20 December 2024; 15:12	"Experimental communications" satellite			

== Sources ==
- McDowell, Jonathan. "Launch Log". Jonathan's Space Page.
- McDowell, Jonathan. "Satellite Catalog". Jonathan's Space Page.
- Krebs, Gunter. "DF-5 family".
