= Long March 2D =

Chinese orbital carrier rocket

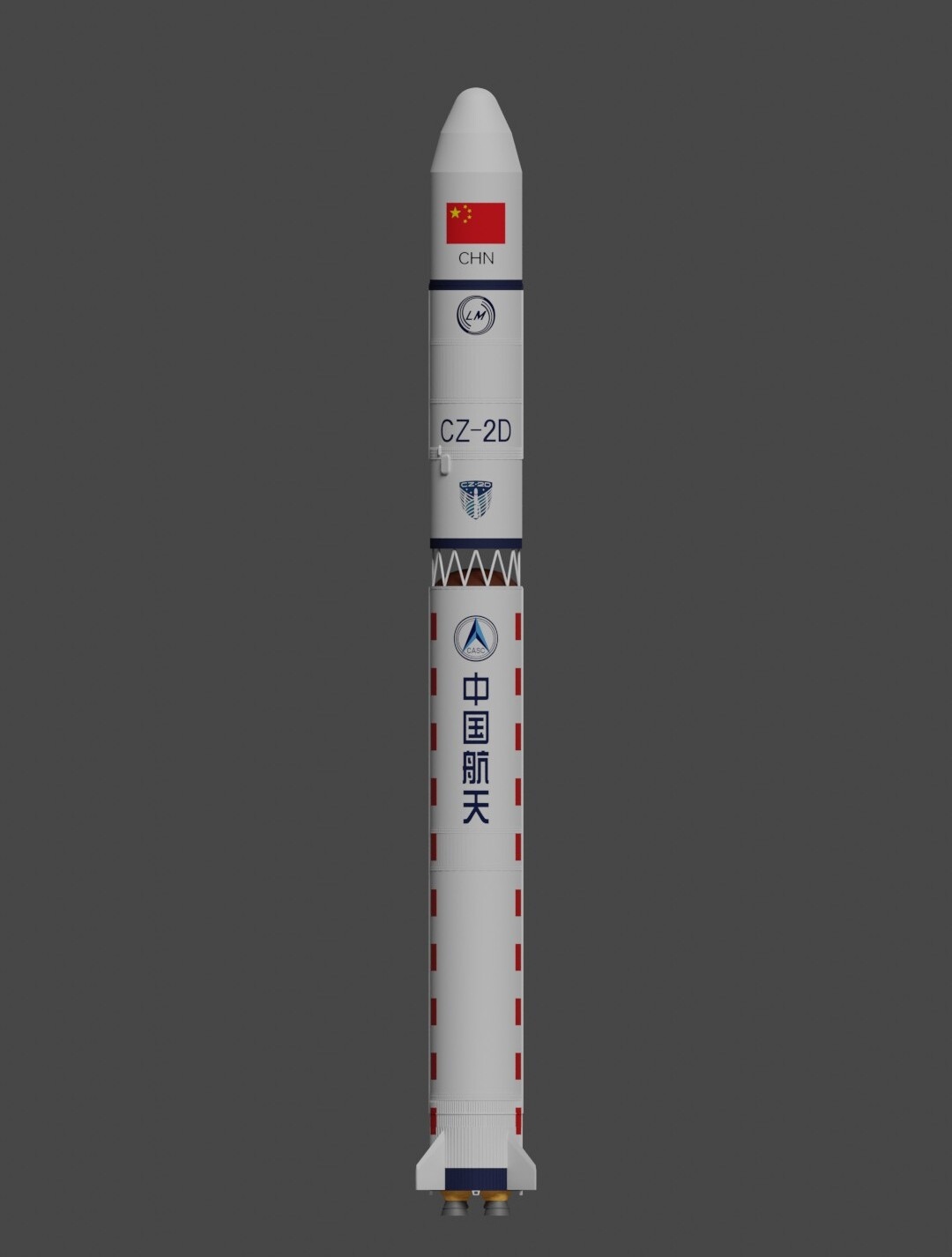
- Rendering of Long March 2D.
- Function: Medium-lift launch vehicle
- Manufacturer: Shanghai Academy of Spaceflight Technology
- Country of origin: China
- Cost per launch: US$30 million

Size
- Height: 41.056 m (134.70 ft)
- Diameter: 3.35 m (11.0 ft)
- Mass: 232,250 kg (512,020 lb)
- Stages: 2

Capacity

Payload to LEO
- Mass: 3,500 kg (7,700 lb)

Payload to SSO
- Mass: 1,300 kg (2,900 lb)

Associated rockets
- Family: Long March

Launch history
- Status: Active
- Launch sites: LA-2/138 and LA-4/SLS-2, JSLC; LA-9, TSLC; LA-3, XSLC
- Total launches: 108
- Success(es): 107
- Partial failure: 1
- First flight: 9 August 1992
- Last flight: 18 November 2026 (most recent)

First stage
- Height: 27.91 m
- Diameter: 3.35 m
- Propellant mass: 182,000 kg (401,000 lb)
- Powered by: 4 YF-21C
- Maximum thrust: 2,961.6 kN (665,800 lb_{f})
- Specific impulse: 2,550 m/s (8,400 ft/s)
- Propellant: N_{2}O_{4} / UDMH

Second stage
- Height: 10.9 m
- Diameter: 3.35 m
- Propellant mass: 52,700 kg (116,200 lb)
- Powered by: 1 YF-24C (1 x YF-22C (Main)) (4 x YF-23C (Vernier))
- Maximum thrust: 742.04 kN (166,820 lb_{f}) (Main); 47.1 kN (10,600 lb_{f}) (Vernier)
- Specific impulse: 2,942 m/s (300.0 s) (Main); 2,834 m/s (289.0 s) (Vernier)
- Propellant: N_{2}O_{4} / UDMH

Third stage (optional) – YZ-3
- Powered by: 1 × YF-50D
- Maximum thrust: 6.5 kN (1,500 lb_{f})
- Specific impulse: 315.5 s (3.094 km/s)
- Propellant: N_{2}O_{4} / UDMH

The Long March 2D (Chinese: 长征二号丁火箭), also known as the Chang Zheng 2D, CZ-2D, and LM-2D, is a Chinese two-stage orbital carrier rocket mainly used for launching LEO and SSO satellites. It is manufactured by the Shanghai Academy of Spaceflight Technology (SAST).

Unlike all other members of the Long March 2 rocket family, the Long March 2D is a two-stage version of the Long March 4 launch vehicle.

It is mainly launched from areas LA-2B and LA-4 at the Jiuquan Satellite Launch Center. The Long March 2D made its maiden flight on 9 August 1992. It was initially used to launch FSW-2 and FSW-3 reconnaissance satellites. More recently it has also launched from LA-9 TSLC and LA-3 XSLC.

== Launch statistics ==
As of May 2026 LM 2D has launched 105 times :

- Failure
- Partial failure
- Success
- Planned

== List of launches ==
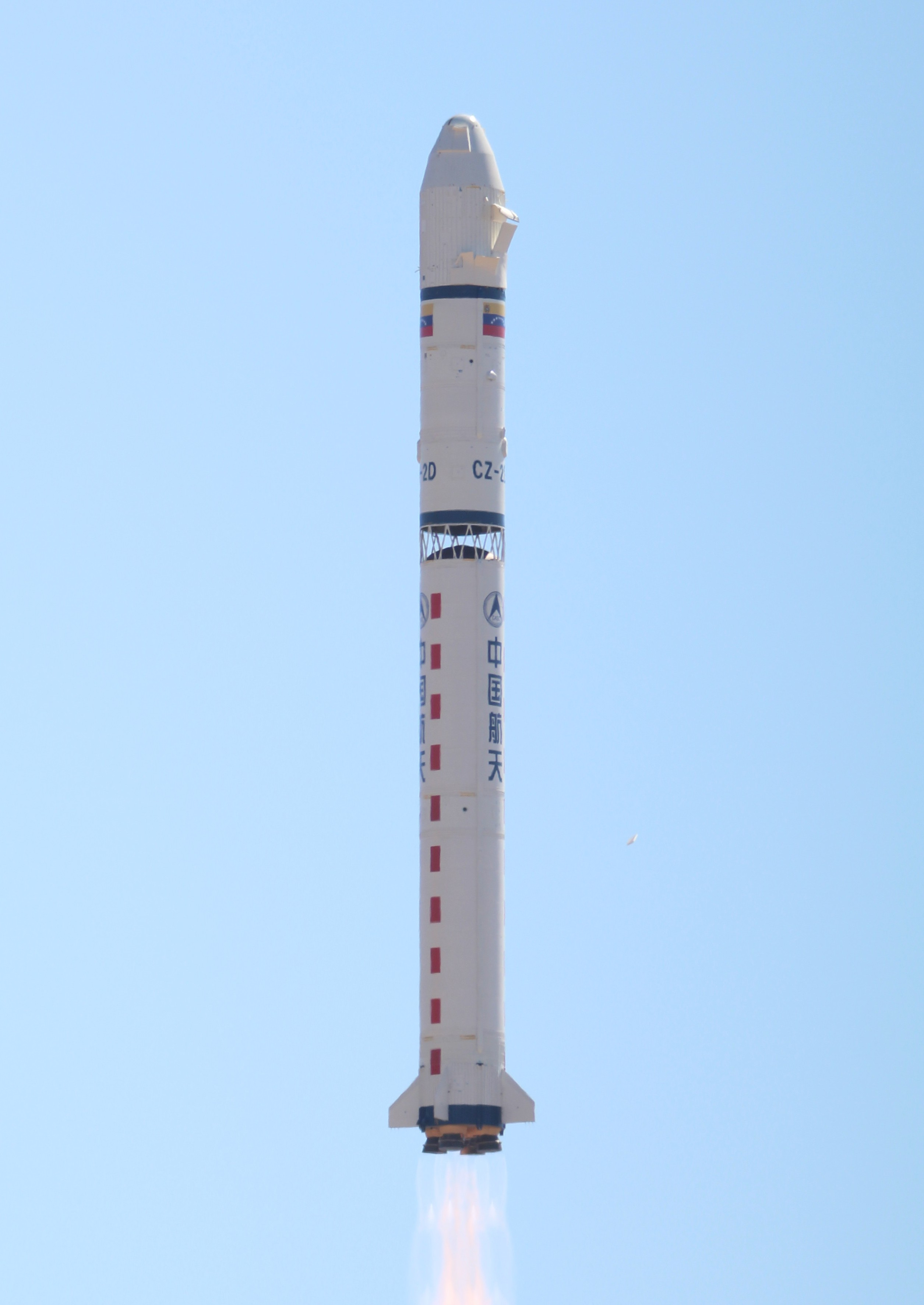
Long March 2D launch of VRSS-1 in September 2012

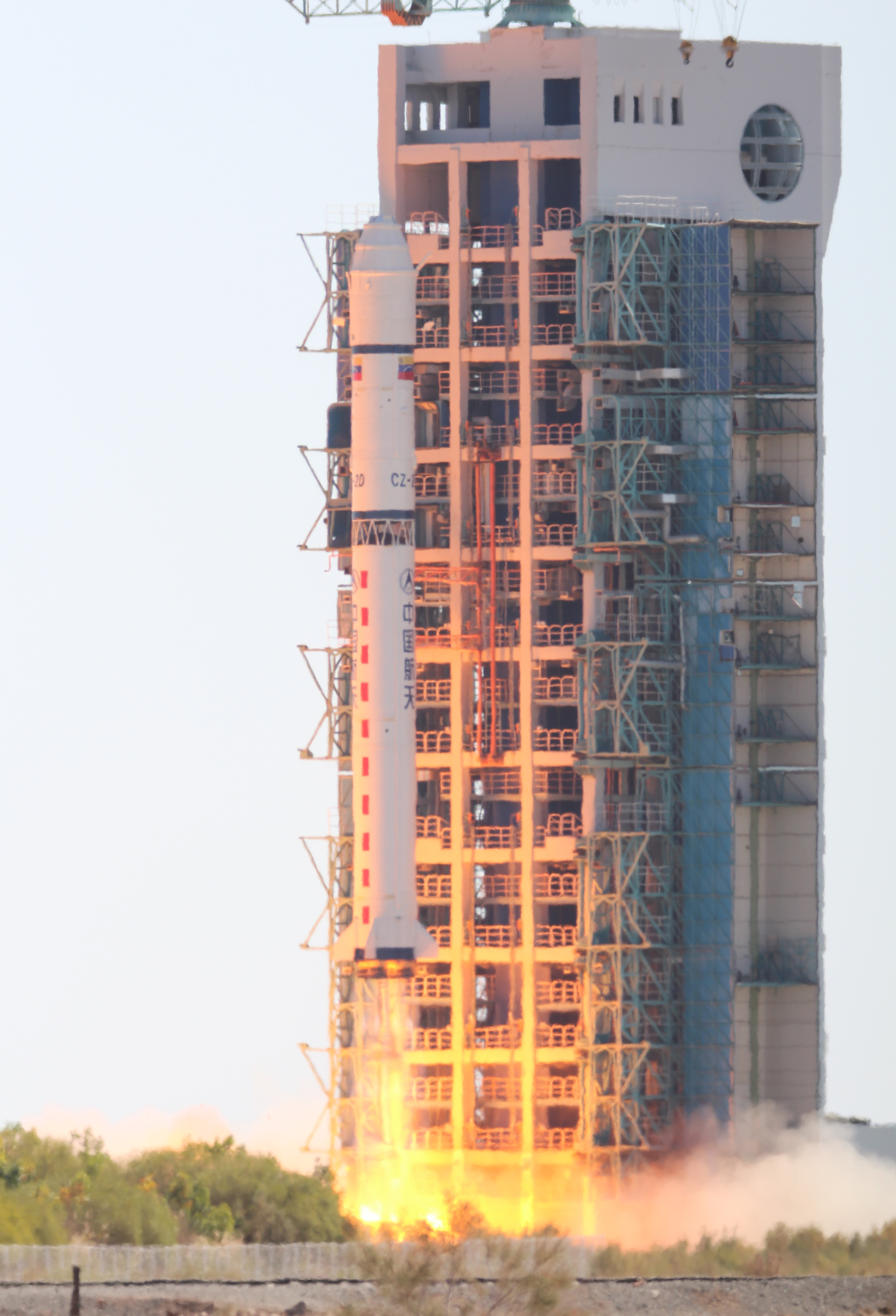
Launch of the first Venezuelan Earth observation satellite, VRSS-1 / Miranda, by the LM-2D launch vehicle.

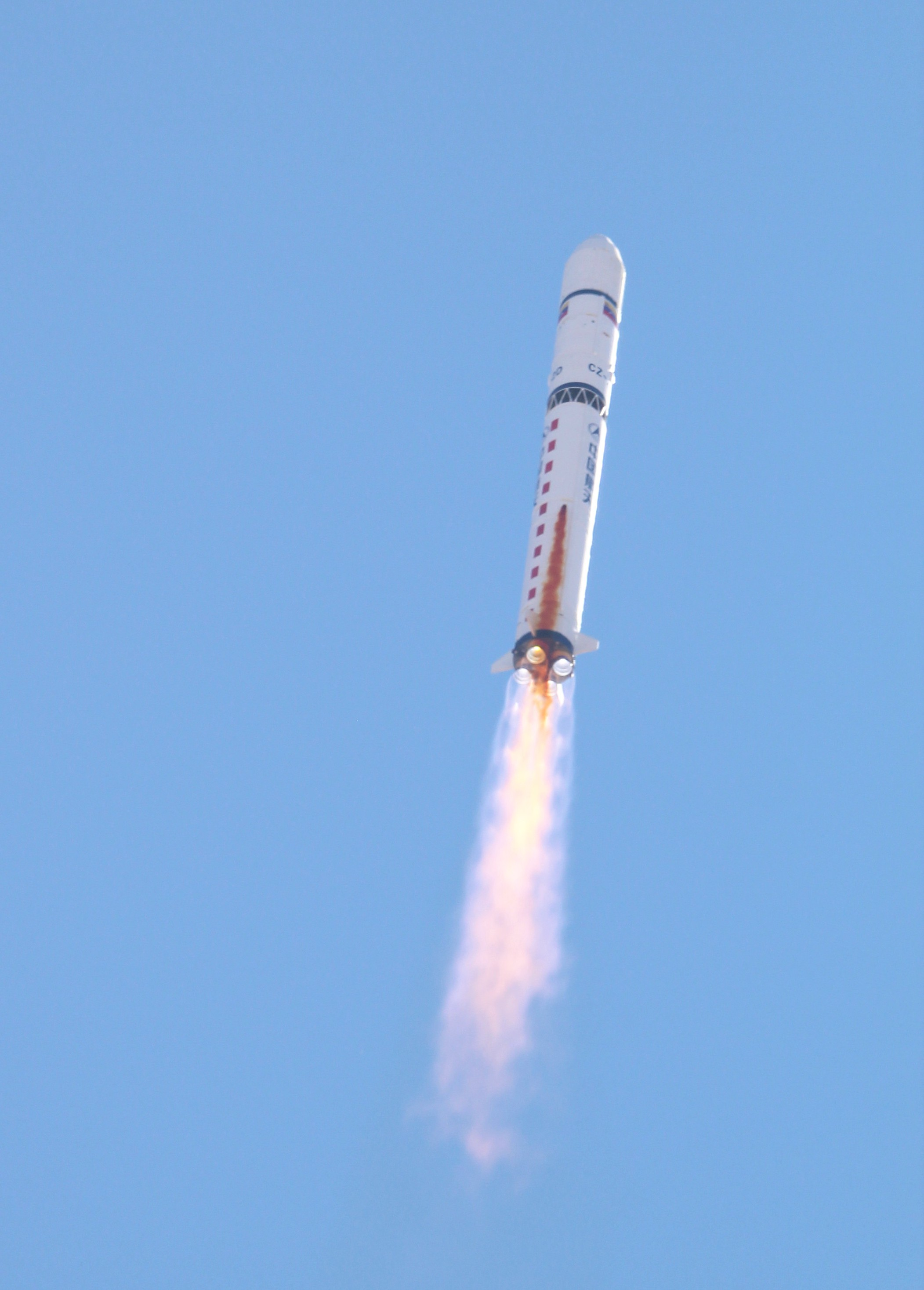
Launch of the first Venezuelan Earth observation satellite, VRSS-1 / Miranda.

The Long March 2D made its maiden flight on 9 August 1992.

Flight number	Serial number	Date (UTC)	Launch site	Upper stage	Payload	Orbit	Result
1	Y1	9 August 1992; 08:00	LA-2/138, JSLC	None	FSW-2 No.1	LEO	Success
2	Y2	3 July 1994; 08:00	LA-2/138, JSLC	None	FSW-2 No.2	LEO	Success
3	Y3	20 October 1996; 07:20	LA-2/138, JSLC	None	FSW-2 No.3	LEO	Success
4	Y4	3 November 2003; 07:20	LA-4/SLS-2, JSLC	None	FSW-3 No.1	LEO	Success
5	Y5	27 September 2004; 08:00	LA-4/SLS-2, JSLC	None	FSW-3 No.2	LEO	Success
6	Y6	5 July 2005; 22:40	LA-4/SLS-2, JSLC	None	Shijian 7	SSO	Success
7	Y7	29 August 2005; 08:45	LA-4/SLS-2, JSLC	None	FSW-3 No.3	LEO	Success
8	Y8	25 May 2007; 07:12	LA-4/SLS-2, JSLC	None	Yaogan 2 ZDPS-1	SSO	Success
9	Y12	5 November 2008; 00:15	LA-4/SLS-2, JSLC	None	Shiyan 3 Chuangxin-1-02	SSO	Success
10	Y9	1 December 2008; 04:42	LA-4/SLS-2, JSLC	None	Yaogan 4	SSO	Success
11	Y10	9 December 2009; 08:42	LA-4/SLS-2, JSLC	None	Yaogan 7	SSO	Success
12	Y15	15 June 2010; 01:39	LA-4/SLS-2, JSLC	None	Shijian 12	SSO	Success
13	Y14	24 August 2010; 07:10	LA-4/SLS-2, JSLC	None	Tianhui-1A	SSO	Success
14	Y11	22 September 2010; 02:42	LA-4/SLS-2, JSLC	None	Yaogan 11; ZDPS-1A; ZDPS-1B	SSO	Success
15	Y19	20 November 2011; 00:15	LA-4/SLS-2, JSLC	None	Shiyan 4 Chuangxin-1-03	SSO	Success
16	Y17	6 May 2012; 07:10	LA-4/SLS-2, JSLC	None	Tianhui-1B	SSO	Success
17	Y16	29 September 2012; 04:12	LA-4/SLS-2, JSLC	None	VRSS-1	SSO	Success
18	Y22	18 December 2012; 16:13	LA-4/SLS-2, JSLC	None	Göktürk-2	SSO	Success
19	Y18	26 April 2013; 04:13	LA-4/SLS-2, JSLC	None	Gaofen 1 TurkSat-3USat; NEE-01 Pegaso; CubeBug-1	SSO	Success
20	Y23	25 November 2013; 02:12	LA-4/SLS-2, JSLC	None	Shiyan 5	SSO	Success
21	Y25	4 September 2014; 00:15	LA-4/SLS-2, JSLC	None	Chuangxin-1-04; Lingqiao	SSO	Success
22	Y24	20 November 2014; 07:12	LA-4/SLS-2, JSLC	None	Yaogan 24	SSO	Success
23	Y21	14 September 2015; 04:42	LA-4/SLS-2, JSLC	None	Gaofen 9	SSO	Success
24	Y37	7 October 2015; 04:13	LA-4/SLS-2, JSLC	None	Jilin-1A; Jilin-1B; Jilin-1C; Jilin-1D	SSO	Success
25	Y26	26 October 2015; 07:10	LA-4/SLS-2, JSLC	None	Tianhui-1C	SSO	Success
26	Y31	17 December 2015; 00:12	LA-4/SLS-2, JSLC	None	DAMPE	SSO	Success
27	Y36	5 April 2016; 17:38	LA-4/SLS-2, JSLC	None	Shijian 10	LEO	Success
28	Y27	15 May 2016; 02:43	LA-4/SLS-2, JSLC	None	Yaogan 30	SSO	Success
29	Y32	15 August 2016; 17:40	LA-4/SLS-2, JSLC	None	QSS; LiXing-1; 3Cat-2	SSO	Success
30	Y34	11 November 2016; 23:14	LA-4/SLS-2, JSLC	None	Yunhai-1-01	SSO	Success
31	Y33	21 December 2016; 19:22	LA-4/SLS-2, JSLC	None	TanSat	SSO	Success
32	Y39	28 December 2016; 03:23	LA-9, TSLC	None	SuperView-1 01; SuperView-1 02; BY70-1	SSO	Partial failure
33	Y30	9 October 2017; 04:13	LA-4/SLS-2, JSLC	None	VRSS-2	SSO	Success
34	Y47	3 December 2017; 04:11	LA-4/SLS-2, JSLC	None	LKW-1	SSO	Success
35	Y48	23 December 2017; 04:14	LA-4/SLS-2, JSLC	None	LKW-2	SSO	Success
36	Y40	9 January 2018; 03:24	LA-9, TSLC	None	SuperView-1 03; SuperView-1 04	SSO	Success
37	Y49	13 January 2018; 07:10	LA-4/SLS-2, JSLC	None	LKW-3	SSO	Success
38	Y13	2 February 2018; 07:51	LA-4/SLS-2, JSLC	None	CSES-01 (Zhangheng 1)	SSO	Success
39	Y50	17 March 2018; 07:10	LA-4/SLS-2, JSLC	None	LKW-4	SSO	Success
40	Y20	2 June 2018; 04:13	LA-4/SLS-2, JSLC	None	Gaofen 6 Luojia 1	SSO	Success
41	Y28	19 November 2018; 23:40	LA-4/SLS-2, JSLC	None	Shiyan 6-01; Jiading 1 Tianzhi-1	SSO	Success
42	Y38	7 December 2018; 04:12	LA-4/SLS-2, JSLC	None	SaudiSat 5A; SaudiSat 5B	SSO	Success
43	Y35	29 December 2018; 08:00	LA-4/SLS-2, JSLC	YZ-3	Yunhai-2 01-06; Hongyan-1	LEO	Success
44	Y43	25 September 2019; 00:54	LA-4/SLS-2, JSLC	None	Yunhai-1-02	SSO	Success
45	Y58	15 January 2020; 02:53	LA-9, TSLC	None	Jilin-1 Kuanfu-01; ÑuSat-7; ÑuSat-8	SSO	Success
46	Y61	19 February 2020; 21:07	LA-3, XSLC	None	XJSS C/D/E/F	LEO	Success
47	Y51	31 May 2020; 08:53	LA-4/SLS-2, JSLC	None	Gaofen 9-02; HEAD-4	SSO	Success
48	Y52	17 June 2020; 07:19	LA-4/SLS-2, JSLC	None	Gaofen 9-03; HEAD-5; ZDPS-3	SSO	Success
49	Y29	4 July 2020; 23:44	LA-4/SLS-2, JSLC	None	Shiyan 6-02	SSO	Success
50	Y56	6 August 2020; 04:01	LA-4/SLS-2, JSLC	None	Gaofen 9-04	SSO	Success
51	Y57	23 August 2020; 02:27	LA-4/SLS-2, JSLC	None	Gaofen 9-05; Tiantuo 5	SSO	Success
52	Y54	11 June 2021; 03:03	LA-9, TSLC	None	Beijing-3A; Hisea-2; Yang Wang-1; Tianjian (TKSY01-TJ)	SSO	Success
53	Y74	3 July 2021; 02:51	LA-9, TSLC	None	Jilin-1 Kuanfu-01B; Jilin-1 Gaofen-03D × 3 Xingshidai-10	SSO	Success
54	Y62	29 July 2021; 04:01	LA-4/SLS-2, JSLC	None	Tianhui-1D	SSO	Success
55	Y53	14 October 2021; 10:51	LA-9, TSLC	None	CHASE (Chinese Hα Solar Explorer); Golden Bauhinia-2; Guidao Daqi Midu TSW; HEAD-2E; HEAD-2F; MOTS; QX-1; SSS-1; SSS-2A; Tianshu-1; Tianyuan-1	SSO	Success
56	Y63	6 November 2021; 03:00	LA-3, XSLC	None	Yaogan 35A; Yaogan 35B; Yaogan 35C	LEO	Success
57	Y41	29 December 2021; 11:13	LA-4/SLS-2, JSLC	None	Tianhui-4	SSO	Success
58	Y70	17 January 2022; 02:35	LA-9, TSLC	None	Shiyan 13	SSO	Success
59	Y79	5 May 2022; 02:38	LA-9, TSLC	None	Jilin-1 Kuanfu-01C; Jilin-1 Gaofen-03D × 7	SSO	Success
60	Y64	23 June 2022; 02:22	LA-3, XSLC	None	Yaogan 35-02A; Yaogan 35-02B; Yaogan 35-02C	LEO	Success
61	Y65	29 July 2022; 13:28	LA-3, XSLC	None	Yaogan 35-03A; Yaogan 35-03B; Yaogan 35-03C	LEO	Success
62	Y66	19 August 2022; 17:37	LA-3, XSLC	None	Yaogan 35-04A; Yaogan 35-04B; Yaogan 35-04C	LEO	Success
63	Y75	24 August 2022; 03:01	LA-9, TSLC	None	Beijing-3B	SSO	Success
64	Y67	6 September 2022; 04:19	LA-3, XSLC	None	Yaogan 35-05A; Yaogan 35-05B; Yaogan 35-05C	LEO	Success
65	Y76	20 September 2022; 23:15	LA-4/SLS-2, JSLC	None	Yunhai-1 03	SSO	Success
66	Y68	26 September 2022; 13:38	LA-3, XSLC	None	Yaogan 36-01A; Yaogan 36-01B; Yaogan 36-01C	LEO	Success
67	Y55	8 October 2022; 23:43	LA-4/SLS-2, JSLC	None	ASO-S (Kuafu-1)	SSO	Success
68	Y69	14 October 2022; 19:12	LA-3, XSLC	None	Yaogan 36-02A; Yaogan 36-02B; Yaogan 36-02C	LEO	Success
69	Y72	29 October 2022; 01:01	LA-4/SLS-2, JSLC	None	Shiyan 20C	LEO	Success
70	Y89	27 November 2022; 12:23	LA-3, XSLC	None	Yaogan 36-03A; Yaogan 36-03B; Yaogan 36-03C	LEO	Success
71	Y45	8 December 2022; 18:31	LA-9, TSLC	None	Gaofen 5-01A	SSO	Success
72	Y80	14 December 2022; 18:25	LA-3, XSLC	None	Yaogan 36-04A; Yaogan 36-04B; Yaogan 36-04C	LEO	Success
73	Y73	13 January 2023; 07:00	LA-4/SLS-2, JSLC	None	Yaogan 37; Shiyan 22A; Shiyan 22B	LEO	Success
74	Y71	15 January 2023; 03:14	LA-9, TSLC	None	Beiyou-1; Jilin-1 Gaofen-03D 34; Jilin-1 Hongwai-A 07/08; Jilin-1 MF-02A 03/04/07; Luojia-3-01; Qilu-2/3; Rizhao-3; Golden Bauhinia-3/4/6	SSO	Success
75	Y90	30 March 2023; 10:50	LA-9, TSLC	None	PIESAT-1A 01; PIESAT-1B 01; PIESAT-1B 02; PIESAT-1B 03	SSO	Success
76	Y88	15 June 2023; 05:30	LA-9, TSLC	None	8 × Jilin-1 Gaofen-03D; 30 x Jilin-1 Gaofen-06A; 2 x Jilin-1 Pingtai-02A; Heergousi-1	SSO	Success
77	Y91	23 July 2023; 02:50	LA-9, TSLC	None	Lingxi-03; Skysight AS-01; Skysight AS-02; Skysight AS-03	LEO	Success
78	Y81	26 July 2023; 20:02	LA-3, XSLC	None	Yaogan 36-05A; Yaogan 36-05B; Yaogan 36-05C	LEO	Success
79	Y82	31 August 2023; 07:36	LA-3, XSLC	None	Yaogan 39-01A; Yaogan 39-01B; Yaogan 39-01C	LEO	Success
80	Y83	17 September 2023; 04:13	LA-3, XSLC	None	Yaogan 39-02A; Yaogan 39-02B; Yaogan 39-02C	LEO	Success
81	Y84	5 October 2023; 00:24	LA-3, XSLC	None	Yaogan 39-03A; Yaogan 39-03B; Yaogan 39-03C	LEO	Success
82	Y77	15 October 2023; 00:54	LA-4/SLS-2, JSLC	None	Yunhai-1 04	SSO	Success
83	Y85	23 October 2023; 20:03	LA-3, XSLC	None	Yaogan 39-04A; Yaogan 39-04B; Yaogan 39-04C	LEO	Success
84	Y59	23 November 2023; 10:00	LA-3, XSLC	YZ-3	Hulianwang Jishu Shiyan 2A, 2B, 2C	LEO	Success
85	Y86	10 December 2023; 01:58	LA-3, XSLC	None	Yaogan 39-05A; Yaogan 39-05B; Yaogan 39-05C	LEO	Success
86	Y87	21 March 2024; 05:27	LA-4/SLS-2, JSLC	YZ-3	Yunhai-2 × 6 (07-12)	LEO	Success
87	Y102	2 April 2024; 22:56	LA-3, XSLC	None	Yaogan 42-01	LEO	Success
88	Y97	15 April 2024; 04:12	LA-4/SLS-2, JSLC	None	SuperView Neo 3-01	SSO	Success
89	Y103	20 April 2024; 23:45	LA-3, XSLC	None	Yaogan 42-02	LEO	Success
90	Y98	20 May 2024; 03:06	LA-9, TSLC	None	Beijing-3C 01; Beijing-3C 02; Beijing-3C 03; Beijing-3C 04	SSO	Success
91	Y99	20 September 2024; 04:11	LA-9, TSLC	None	Jilin-1 Kuanfu-02B (01-06)	SSO	Success
92	Y78	27 September 2024; 10:30	LA-4/SLS-2, JSLC	None	Shijian-19	LEO	Success
93	Y60	12 December 2024; 07:17	LA-4/SLS-2, JSLC	YZ-3	Gaosu Jiguang Zuanshi Xingzuo Shiyan Xitong (High-speed Laser Diamond Constellation Experimental System) × 5	LEO	Success
94	Y99	16 December 2024; 18:50	LA-9, TSLC	None	PIESAT-2 09; PIESAT-2 10; PIESAT-2 11; PIESAT-2 12	SSO	Success
95	Y101	17 January 2025; 04:07	LA-4/SLS-2, JSLC	None	PRSC-EO1; Lantan-1; Tianlu-1	SSO	Success
96	Y100	15 March 2025; 04:11	LA-4/SLS-2, JSLC	None	SuperView Neo 3-02; Tianyan 23	SSO	Success
97	Y78	1 April 2025; 04:00	LA-4/SLS-2, JSLC	None	4 x SatNet test satellites	LEO	Success
98	Y107	14 May 2025; 04:12	LA-4/SLS-2, JSLC	None	Xingshidai 27-38	SSO	Success
99	Y42	14 June 2025; 07:56	LA-4/SLS-2, JSLC	None	CSES-02 (Zhangheng 1-02)	SSO	Success
100	Y94	29 September 2025; 03:00	LA-3, XSLC	None	Shiyan 30A; Shiyan 30B	LEO	Success
101	Y92	13 October 2025; 10:00	LA-4/SLS-2, JSLC	None	Shiyan 31	LEO	Success
102	Y95	12 March 2026; 22:33	LA-3, XSLC	None	Shiyan 30C; Shiyan 30D	LEO	Success
103	Y105	25 March 2026; 22:51	LA-9, TSLC	None	SuperView Neo 2-05/06	SSO	Success
104	Y109	24 April 2026; 06:35	LA-3, XSLC	None	SatNet test satellite	LEO	Success
105	Y119	30 May 2026; 18:07	LA-3, XSLC	None	4 x SatNet test satellites	LEO	Success
106	Y104	19 September 2026; 10:50	LA-9, TSLC	None	PIESAT-2 13-16	SSO	Success
107	Y108	11 November 2026; 11:41	LA-4/SLS-2, JSLC	None	CAS Pathfinder-1	SSO	Success
108	Y106	18 November 2026; 22:51	LA-9, TSLC	None	Shijian-24	SSO	Success
109	Y?	26 November 2026; 09:35	LA-3, XSLC	None	Unknown Payload	LEO	Planned

== See also ==
- List of Long March launches (2025-2029)
