= Dark Matter Particle Explorer =

Chinese science satellite

Dark Matter Particle Explorer (DAMPE)
- Names: Wukong, TanSuo
- Mission type: High-energy Astronomy
- Operator: CAS
- COSPAR ID: 2015-078A
- SATCAT no.: 41173
- Mission duration: 3 years (planned); Elapsed: 10 years, 10 months, 29 days

Spacecraft properties
- Payload mass: 1,400 kg (3,100 lb)
- Power: 400 W

Start of mission
- Launch date: 17 December 2015 00:12 UTC
- Rocket: Long March 2D, No. 2D-Y31
- Launch site: Jiuquan Launch Area 4, Launch Pad 603
- Contractor: SAST

Orbital parameters
- Reference system: Sun-synchronous orbit
- Periapsis altitude: 500 km (310 mi)
- Inclination: 97.4°

Main Gamma rays
- Wavelengths: high energy gamma ray

The Dark Matter Particle Explorer, or DAMPE, also known as Wukong (Chinese: 悟空), is a Chinese Academy of Sciences (CAS) satellite which launched on 17 December 2015. The satellite was launched on a Long March 2D rocket from Launch Pad 603 at the LC-43 complex, also known as the South Launch Site, at the Jiuquan Satellite Launch Center. It is China's first space observatory.

DAMPE is a space telescope used for the detection of high energy gamma rays, electrons and cosmic ray ions, to aid in the search for dark matter. It was designed to look for the indirect decay signal of a hypothetical dark matter candidate called weakly interacting massive particles (WIMPs).

The project is the result of a collaboration among research institutions and universities in Italy, Switzerland and China under the leadership of the Purple Mountain Observatory (PMO) of the Chinese Academy of Sciences (CAS).

== Objectives ==
The scientific objectives of the mission are:

- the search and study of dark matter particles by conducting high-resolution observations of high-energy electrons and gamma rays.
- the study of the origin of cosmic rays by observing high energy electrons and heavy nuclei in the TeV energy range.
- the study of the propagation and acceleration mechanisms of cosmic rays through the observation of high-energy gamma rays.

== Collaboration ==
The project is the result of a collaboration among research institutions and universities in Italy, Switzerland and China under the leadership of the Purple Mountain Observatory (PMO) of the Chinese Academy of Sciences (CAS). The DAMPE mission is funded by the strategic priority science and technology projects in space science of CAS. The institutes that have been part of the collaboration are: IHEP (Institute of High Energy Physics), CAS (Chinese Academy of Sciences), Beijing, China; IMP (Institute of Modern Physics), CAS (Chinese Academy of Sciences), Lanzhou, China; NSSC (National Space Science Center), CAS (Chinese Academy of Sciences), Beijing, China; PMO (Purple Mountain Observatory), CAS (Chinese Academy of Sciences), Nanjing, China; USTC (University of Science and Technology of China), Hefei, China; INFN (Istituto Nazionale di Fisica Nucleare) and University of Perugia, Italy; INFN (Istituto Nazionale di Fisica Nucleare) and University of Bari, Italy; INFN (Istituto Nazionale di Fisica Nucleare) and University of Lecce, Italy; INFN (Istituto Nazionale di Fisica Nucleare) and Gran Sasso Science Institute (GSSI), L'Aquila, Italy; DPNC (Département de physique nucléaire et corpusculaire), University of Geneva, Switzerland.

== Results ==
The first scientific result of DAMPE came in November 2017 as the direct detection of a break in the cosmic electron plus positron energy spectrum at an energy of 0.9 TeV.

In October 2019, DAMPE released its measurement of the proton component of cosmic rays, confirming previous results while also hinting towards new features in the energy spectrum.

In May 2021 the collaboration published the helium spectrum between 70 GeV and 80 TeV, drawn from four and a half years of data. It confirmed a hardening near 1.3 TeV that earlier experiments had seen, and reported a softening near 34 TeV for the first time, at a significance of 4.3σ.

A measurement of the boron-to-carbon and boron-to-oxygen flux ratios followed in 2022, covering 10 GeV to 5.6 TeV per nucleon over six years of data. A broken power law fitted both ratios better than a single power law, which points to a hardening at roughly 100 GeV per nucleon.

The boron spectrum itself was reported in 2025, over 10 GeV to 8 TeV per nucleon and eight years of data, with a hardening at 182 ± 24 GeV per nucleon. Boron is a secondary cosmic ray, produced by spallation of heavier nuclei, and its spectrum hardens about twice as much as the primary proton and helium spectra do.

In April 2026 the collaboration published carbon, oxygen and iron spectra in Nature, spanning roughly 20 GV to 100 TV in rigidity (60 TV for iron), from nine years of observations. Taken together with revised proton and helium spectra, the softening occurs at about 15 TV for all five species. A softening set by nuclear mass rather than charge was rejected at a confidence level above 99.999 percent.

== Naming ==
The space observatory is named Wukong (Chinese: 悟空) after the Sun Wukong, who is the hero in the classic Chinese tale Journey to the West. Literally, "wu"(悟) means comprehension or understanding and "kong"（空）means void, so this name could also be understood as "understanding the void", relating to the undiscovered nature of dark matter.

The English name, DAMPE, was a backronym, which was named after a non-player character (NPC) in The Legend of Zelda, Dampé (ダンペイ). In the game, the player needs Dampé to find the treasure, which matches with the mission of DAMPE (not finding dark matter, but finding the evidence that dark matter exists).
