= SaudiSat 5A,5B =

Saudi Arabian imaging satellites

SaudiSat 5A, 5B
- Function: Remote-sensing, Earth Observation
- Manufacturer: KACST
- Country of origin: Saudi Arabia

Size
- Mass: 425 kg

Launch history
- Status: Active

SaudiSat 5A and 5B are two Saudi satellites were developed, manufactured and operated by the King Abdulaziz City for Science and Technology (KACST). The aim of these satellites is to provide high-resolution images of the planet's surface from low Earth orbits which will be utilized for urban planning, monitor movements and changes on the Earth's surface. The high-resolution images will also be used by government agencies for use in various fields of development.

== Launch ==
SaudiSat 5A and 5B were launched on December 7, 2018, at 04:12 (UTC) by the Chinese orbital carrier rocket Long March 2D from the Jiuquan Satellite Launch Center of China.
