= Yunhai-2 =

Chinese weather satellite group

- Operator: CNSA
- COSPAR ID: 2018-112 (Yunhai-2 01) 2024-052 (Yunhai-2 02)

Spacecraft properties
- Manufacturer: SAST

Start of mission
- Contractor: CASC

Yunhai-2 is a Chinese meteorological satellite constellation developed by the Chinese military. The satellites reportedly use the Global Navigation Satellite System Radio Occultation (GNSS-RO) to collect atmospheric data for weather prediction and for ionosphere, climate and gravity research. The satellites are built by the Shanghai Academy of Space Technology (SAST) before being transported to Jiuquan for launch.

== Satellites ==
| Name | COSPAR | Launch Date | Launch Vehicle | Outcome |
|---|---|---|---|---|
| Yunhai-2 01 | 2018-112A | December 29, 2018 | Long March 2D / YZ-3 | Success |
| Yunhai-2 02 | 2018-112B | December 29, 2018 | Long March 2D / YZ-3 | Success |
| Yunhai-2 03 | 2018-112C | December 29, 2018 | Long March 2D / YZ-3 | Success |
| Yunhai-2 04 | 2018-112D | December 29, 2018 | Long March 2D / YZ-3 | Success |
| Yunhai-2 05 | 2018-112E | December 29, 2018 | Long March 2D / YZ-3 | Success |
| Yunhai-2 06 | 2018-112G | December 29, 2018 | Long March 2D / YZ-3 | Success |
| Yunhai-2 07 | 2024-052 | March 21, 2024 | Long March 2D / YZ-3 | Success |
| Yunhai-2 08 | 2024-052 | March 21, 2024 | Long March 2D / YZ-3 | Success |
| Yunhai-2 09 | 2024-052 | March 21, 2024 | Long March 2D / YZ-3 | Success |
| Yunhai-2 10 | 2024-052 | March 21, 2024 | Long March 2D / YZ-3 | Success |
| Yunhai-2 11 | 2024-052 | March 21, 2024 | Long March 2D / YZ-3 | Success |
| Yunhai-2 12 | 2024-052 | March 21, 2024 | Long March 2D / YZ-3 | Success |
