= Hongtu-1 =

Commercial X-band interferometric synthetic aperture radar

Hongtu
- 宏图; Hóngtú

Program overview
- Country: China
- Organization: China Academy of Space Technology (CAST)
- Purpose: Earth observation, reconnaissance
- Status: Active

Program history
- First flight: 30 March 2023
- Last flight: 16 December 2024
- Successes: 12
- Failures: 0
- Launch site: TSLC

Vehicle information
- Launch vehicle(s): Long March 2D, Long March 2C

The Hongtu-1 (Chinese: 宏图一号), known commonly by its English-language name PIESAT-1 and infrequently as Nuwa-1, is a Chinese commercial X-band interferometric synthetic aperture radar (InSAR) satellite constellation performing Earth observation missions in Sun-synchronous orbit. Hongtu-1 satellites are intended to map global non-polar regions at a scale of 1:50,000 meters to produce high-precision digital surface models (DSM), likely fulfilling both commercial, scientific, and military reconnaissance tasks.

The constellation is designed around a hub-and-spoke architecture with three auxiliary (or 'spoke') satellites collecting and a single master (or 'hub') satellite transmitting collected data and receiving instructions for the accompanying auxiliary satellites. Operating in a close formation, these co-orbiting satellites utilize inter-satellite communication to maintain stable and precision synchronization. According to the developer of Hongtu-1 satellites, GalaxySpace, the master satellite weights approximately 320 kilograms and a single auxiliary satellite weights approximately 270 kilograms.

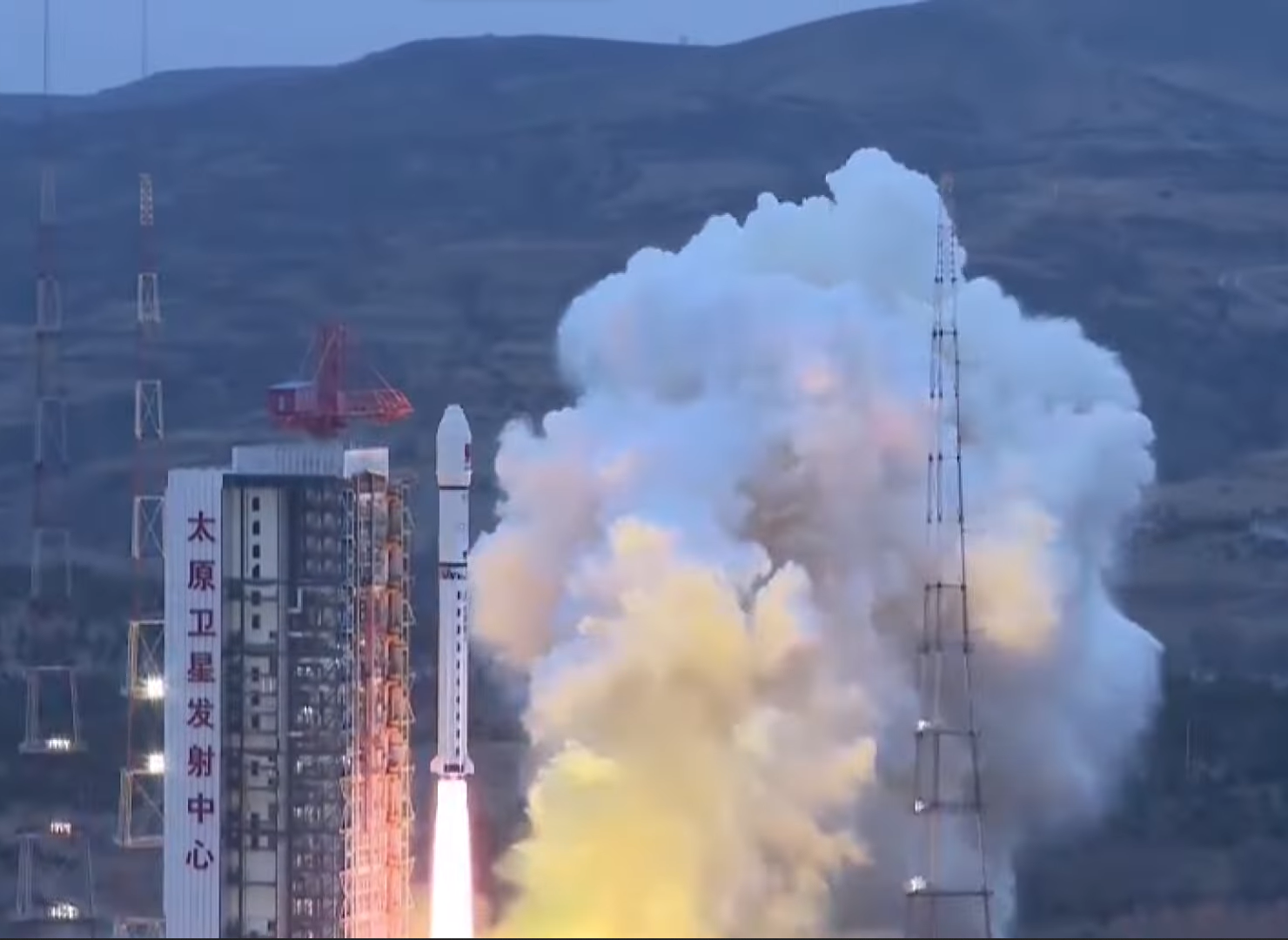
First launch of Hongtu-1 satellites

Hongtu-1 satellites are domestically produced by GalaxySpace, a Beijing-based private satellite developer, for PIESAT Information Technology Co. Ltd. and launched by China Great Wall Industry Corporation (CGWIC), a subsidiary of China Aerospace Science and Technology Corporation (CASC) on a Long March 2D rocket provided by CASC's Shanghai Academy of Spaceflight Technology (SAST). PIESAT has publicly announced their goal to deploy 38 satellites in the constellation, 28 of which are synthetic aperture radar (SAR) alongside 10 optical imaging satellites including panchromatic and multispectral sensors. The first launch of PIESAT-1 (Hongtu-1) satellites took place at Taiyuan Satellite Launch Center (TSLC) in China's Shanxi Province on 30 March 2023.

== Satellites ==
Name	Launch	Orbit	Orbital Apsis	Inclination	SCN	COSPARID	Launch site	Vehicle
PIESAT-1A-01	30 March 2023	SSO	521.2 km × 539.0 km 522.2 km × 540.6 km 520.2 km × 541.3 km 520.5 km × 541.0 km	97.5° 97.5° 97.5° 97.4°	56153 56154; 56155; 56156	2023-047A; 2023-047B; 2023-047C; 2023-047D	TSLC	Long March 2D
PIESAT-1B-01	30 March 2023	SSO	521.2 km × 539.0 km 522.2 km × 540.6 km 520.2 km × 541.3 km 520.5 km × 541.0 km	97.5° 97.5° 97.5° 97.4°	56153 56154; 56155; 56156	2023-047A; 2023-047B; 2023-047C; 2023-047D	TSLC	Long March 2D
PIESAT-1B-02	30 March 2023	SSO	521.2 km × 539.0 km 522.2 km × 540.6 km 520.2 km × 541.3 km 520.5 km × 541.0 km	97.5° 97.5° 97.5° 97.4°	56153 56154; 56155; 56156	2023-047A; 2023-047B; 2023-047C; 2023-047D	TSLC	Long March 2D
PIESAT-1B-03	30 March 2023	SSO	521.2 km × 539.0 km 522.2 km × 540.6 km 520.2 km × 541.3 km 520.5 km × 541.0 km	97.5° 97.5° 97.5° 97.4°	56153 56154; 56155; 56156	2023-047A; 2023-047B; 2023-047C; 2023-047D	TSLC	Long March 2D
PIESAT-2-01	9 November 2024	SSO			61869 61870 61871 61872	2024-203A 2024-203B 2024-203C 2024-203D	JSLC	Long March 2C
PIESAT-2-02	9 November 2024	SSO			61869 61870 61871 61872	2024-203A 2024-203B 2024-203C 2024-203D	JSLC	Long March 2C
PIESAT-2-03	9 November 2024	SSO			61869 61870 61871 61872	2024-203A 2024-203B 2024-203C 2024-203D	JSLC	Long March 2C
PIESAT-2-04	9 November 2024	SSO			61869 61870 61871 61872	2024-203A 2024-203B 2024-203C 2024-203D	JSLC	Long March 2C
PIESAT-2-09	17 December 2024	SSO			62333 62334 62335 62336	2024-241A 2024-241B 2024-241C 2024-241D	TSLC	Long March 2D
PIESAT-2-10	17 December 2024	SSO			62333 62334 62335 62336	2024-241A 2024-241B 2024-241C 2024-241D	TSLC	Long March 2D
PIESAT-2-11	17 December 2024	SSO			62333 62334 62335 62336	2024-241A 2024-241B 2024-241C 2024-241D	TSLC	Long March 2D
PIESAT-2-12	17 December 2024	SSO			62333 62334 62335 62336	2024-241A 2024-241B 2024-241C 2024-241D	TSLC	Long March 2D
Note: The four tracked satellites have not yet been individually tied to the allocated COSPAR identifiers and Satellite Catalog Numbers (SCNs).Sources: United States Space Force (USSF), N2YO
