= Beijing-3C =

Group of satellites launched in 2024

- Operator: CASC
- COSPAR ID: 2024-094

Spacecraft properties
- Manufacturer: CASC

Start of mission
- Launch date: May 20, 2024, 03:06:00 UTC
- Rocket: Long March 2D
- Launch site: Taiyuan Satellite Launch Center

Orbital parameters
- Regime: SSO

Beijing-3C is a constellation of four Chinese Earth observation satellites developed by the China Academy of Space Technology for Twenty First Century Aerospace Technology Co. Ltd. The satellites provide panchromatic imagery at 0.5-metre resolution and multispectral imagery at 2-metre resolution for remote sensing applications. They were launched together aboard a Long March 2D rocket from the Taiyuan Satellite Launch Center on 20 May 2024. The constellation began its operational mission after capturing its first image the following day.

== Description ==
Beijing-3C is a set of four satellites launched in 2024 as part of the Beijing-3 constellation of Earth observation satellites. The satellites were built by the China Academy of Space Technology and launched for Twenty First Century Aerospace Technology Co. Ltd. in Beijing. The constellation consists of four 0.5-meter panchromatic/2-meter multispectral resolution remote sensing satellites. The four satellites were launched on a Long March-2D rocket from the Taiyuan Satellite Launch Center on May 20, 2024. The first image was taken a day later, beginning the satellites operational mission.

== Development ==
The constellation consists of Beijing-3C 01 and 02 and two satellites that also carry names, Nanning-2 (Beijing-3C 03) and the Zhengzhou Airport Satellite (Beijing-3C 04). Nanning-2 provides services to the city of Nanning and the Guangxi Zhuang Autonomous Region, and the Zhengzhou Airport Satellite carries 21AT's onboard intelligent monitoring and on-orbit processing technology. According to a design paper cited on an online forum, each satellite has a push-broom optical camera with a 12 km imaging swath and a mass of about 285 kg. The four satellites were placed in sun-synchronous orbits of about 498 by 485 km at an inclination of 97.5 degrees. The launch was the 523rd flight of the Long March rocket family, and the Long March 2D carried grid fins to limit the landing zone of its first stage.

They work alongside earlier Beijing-3 satellites: Beijing-3A, launched in June 2021, and Beijing-3B, launched in August 2022 with a resolution of 0.3 m and later renamed Beijing-3N.
