= Chinese H-alpha Solar Explorer =

China's first space telescope solar observatory

Chinese H-alpha Solar Explorer (CHASE)
- Mission type: Solar astronomy
- Operator: CNSA
- COSPAR ID: 2021-091A
- SATCAT no.: 49315
- Mission duration: Elapsed: 5 years

Spacecraft properties
- Manufacturer: Chinese Academy of Sciences
- Launch mass: 508 kg

Start of mission
- Launch date: 14 October 2021, 10:51:00 GMT
- Rocket: Long March 2D
- Launch site: Taiyuan Satellite Launch Center
- Contractor: China Aerospace Science and Technology Corporation

Orbital parameters
- Reference system: Sun-synchronous orbit
- Inclination: 98°
- Period: 94 minutes

Chinese H-alpha Solar Explorer (CHASE), also named Xihe (Chinese: 羲和) is China's first space-based solar observatory, developed to study the Sun's atmosphere and solar activity. Launched on 14 October 2021 aboard a Long March 2D rocket, it carries the H-alpha Imaging Spectrograph (HIS), which obtains spectroscopic images of the full solar disk in the H-alpha and iron spectral bands. The instrument observes solar phenomena including flares, eruptive filaments and coronal mass ejections, providing high-resolution data on plasma dynamics in the lower solar atmosphere.

== Development ==
Chinese H-alpha Solar Explorer (CHASE), also named Xihe after the solar deity, is China's first solar observatory. It was launched aboard a Long March 2D rocket on 14 October 2021. CHASE is a 508 kg (1,120 lb) satellite operating at a 517-kilometer-altitude Sun-synchronous orbit, with an orbital period of around 94 minutes.

The CHASE mission was designed to test an ultra-high-precision, highly stable satellite platform and to carry out solar Hα spectroscopic observations, which are important for studying plasma dynamics in the lower solar atmosphere. Its scientific payload is the Hα Imaging Spectrograph (HIS), which has two observing modes. In raster scanning mode it obtains full-Sun or region-of-interest spectral images in the Hα band (6559.7 to 6565.9 Å) and the Fe I band (6567.8 to 6570.6 Å), with a pixel spectral resolution of 0.024 Å and a temporal resolution of one minute.

In continuum imaging mode it obtains photospheric images around 6689 Å. The instrument can complete a full-Sun scan in about 46 seconds. The pixel resolution is 0.52 arcseconds. The data are compressed on board in JPEG2000 format and transmitted to three ground stations in China, at Miyun, Kashi and Sanya, then passed to the Solar Science Data Center of Nanjing University.

The mission's scientific aims include exploring the dynamics of solar eruptions such as flares, eruptive filaments and coronal mass ejections in the photosphere and chromosphere. Because the observations are made from space, HIS provides the first seeing-free spectroscopic observations of the whole solar disk in these passbands. Researchers have used the data for Sun-as-a-star analyses of an X-class flare, to measure the height-dependent differential rotation of the solar atmosphere, and, for 54 observing epochs between January 2024 and October 2025, to compile statistics of solar filament mass.

== See also ==
- Xuntian
