= Gaofen 1 =

First Gaofen satellite

- Mission type: Earth observation
- Operator: China National Space Administration (CNSA)
- COSPAR ID: 2013-018A
- SATCAT no.: 39150
- Mission duration: 5~8 years

Spacecraft properties
- Bus: CAST-2000
- Manufacturer: China Association for Science and Technology (CAST)
- Launch mass: 1,080 kilograms (2,380 pounds)
- Power: 1278 watts

Start of mission
- Launch date: 26 April 2013, 04:13:00 UTC
- Rocket: Long March-2D
- Launch site: Jiuquan Satellite Launch Center, LA-4
- Contractor: China Academy of Launch Vehicle Technology (CALT)

Orbital parameters
- Reference system: Geocentric orbit
- Regime: Sun-synchronous orbit
- Perigee altitude: 625.3 kilometers (388.5 miles)
- Apogee altitude: 651.2 kilometers (404.6 miles)
- Inclination: 98.05°
- Period: 97.5 minutes

Transponders
- Band: S-band; C-band; X-band

Gaofen 1 (Chinese: 高分一号; pinyin: Gāofēn Yī hào; lit. 'high resolution - number 1') is a Chinese high-resolution Earth observation satellite, and the first of the Gaofen series satellites.

== History ==
The civilian CHEOS (China High-resolution Earth Observation System) satellite program was proposed in 2006 and received approval in 2010. Gaofen 1 was the first of six planned CHEOS spacecraft for being launched between 2013 and 2016. The satellite's primary goal is to provide near real time observations for disaster prevention and relief, climate change monitoring, geographical mapping, environmental and resource surveying as well as precision agriculture support.

Subsequently, over twelve satellites were launched in the Gaofen series, with varying optical, infrared and radar imaging capabilities. They are managed by civilians.

== Launch ==
Gaofen 1 was launched on 26 April 2013 at 04:13 UTC with a Long March 2D carrier rocket from the Jiuquan Satellite Launch Center along with the three small experimental satellites: TurkSat-3USat (Turkey), CubeBug 1 (Argentina) and NEE-01 Pegaso (Ecuador) in a Sun-synchronous orbit.

== See also ==
- Chinese space program
