= Origin Space =

Chinese private company

Origin Space Co., Ltd. (Chinese: 起源太空) is the first space technology enterprise in China dedicated to the exploration, development, and utilization of space resources. Focusing on the world's most cutting-edge space resources industry, the company takes data services as an entry point. It gradually expands to on-orbit servicing and commercial exploitation of space resources through university research missions, space object observation, space object database, and other businesses.

== History ==
The company was established in 2019, and raised additional capital through a US$7 million angel round led by Matrix Partners China and Linear Venture.

Origin Space initially focuses on fielding multi-spectrum space telescopes. After a small ultraviolet spectroscopy telescope was carried into Earth's orbit in September 2019, the company is working on an X-ray space telescope with Hong Kong University, and signed a contract to build an optical telescope.

== Satellites launched by Origin Space ==
Origin Space launched the Lobster Eye X-ray detection satellite in July 2020, in cooperation with Nanjing University. It is the first 70 kg commercial space science satellite and the first large field-of-view observation satellite in the world, carrying out research on the detection of cosmic dark matter signals and analyzing asteroid composition observation.

The company successfully launched the NEO-1 satellite aboard a Long March 6 rocket on 27 April 2021. This satellite will be used to conduct scientific research based on observations of small celestial bodies in low-Earth orbit and to test a prototype technology for acquiring space resources.

Yangwang-1 Space Telescope was launched in June 2021, which is China's first commercial space optical, ultraviolet telescope to detect and monitor asteroids and space debris. It can also do astronomy observations, e.g. Large Magellanic Cloud.

Carrying two sets of coaxial telescopes, optical and ultraviolet, Yangwang-1 Space Telescope can execute multiple tasks, such as sky survey, nighttime light remote sensing, and observation of small near-earth objects, atmospheric luminescence, and space object. Yangwang-1 completed the world's first all-sky optical survey in June 2022.

The Minor Planet Center officially awarded Yangwang-1 the space observatory code C59.

The M² lunar rover is scheduled to launch in 2024. It will be China's first commercial activity of exploring the Moon, testing mining equipment, realizing a significant landmark for commercial deep space exploration, and participating in the world's wave of commercial lunar exploration.

== Business Area ==
Origin Space is constantly looking for strategic partners in space resource utilization or any related industries worldwide.

Meanwhile, the company is actively providing services for the following industries:

1. Geospatial intelligence;
2. Energy sector, monitoring of oil/gas transportation system, monitoring of electricity transportation facilities;
3. Ecological sector, environment protection, natural disaster prevention;
4. Agricultural sector, farmland survey, crops monitoring;
5. Housing construction, infrastructure, city planning;
6. Meteorological sector;
7. Customized Satellite Service;
8. Space science observations and experiments;
9. Utilization of near-earth asteroid resources.

== Team ==
Members of Origin Space include scholars and experts who come from Harvard University, Massachusetts Institute of Technology, Peking University, Tsinghua University, University of Hong Kong, Macao University of Science and Technology, National Central University, Kyushu University in Japan, German Space Agency, and other first-class universities. Most of them have participated in all recent asteroid deep space exploration projects. In addition, the company has senior aerospace system engineers and entrepreneurs with rich experience.

The research fields of team members spread in interdisciplinary scientific and technological fields such as planetary science, mineralogy, astronomy, space engineering, artificial intelligence, and big data.
