= DRDO WhAP =

Family of Indian armoured personnel carriers

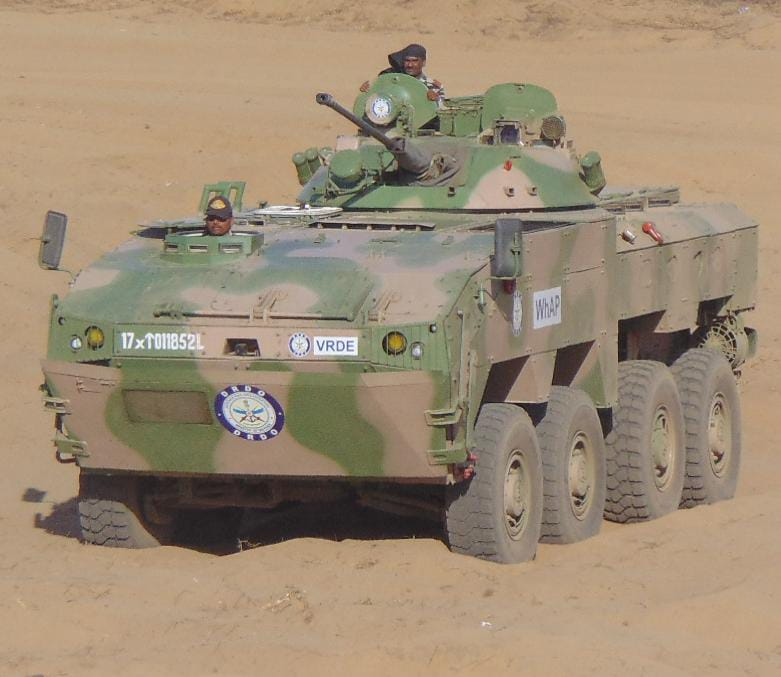
- DRDO WhAP prototype at DefExpo 2018
- Type: Wheeled armoured personnel carrier
- Place of origin: India

Service history
- In service: 2017-Present
- Used by: Indian Army; Central Reserve Police Force; Royal Moroccan Army

Production history
- Designer: Combat Vehicle Research and Development Establishment
- Manufacturer: Tata Advanced Systems; Mahindra Defence Systems
- Produced: 2014-Present
- No. built: 50

Specifications (Tata Kestrel)
- Mass: 24 tonnes (26 tons)
- Length: 7.85 metres (25.8 ft)
- Width: 3.00 metres (9.84 ft)
- Height: 2.3 metres (7 ft 7 in)
- Crew: 10-12
- Armor: Applique and composites along with welded steel; Modular armour for mine and ballistic protection of up to level III and IV, respectively (STANAG 4569)
- Main armament: 30mm autocannon turret (WhAP variant) (or); 7.62 mm medium machine gun RCWS (IPMV variant)
- Secondary armament: WhAP variant: 7.62 mm coaxial machine gun; Twin anti-tank guided missile launcher or an automatic grenade launcher
- Engine: Cummins ISXe 600 diesel engine (or); CVRDE-Ashok Leyland 600hp engine (future); 600 hp @ 1800-2000RPM / 2508nm torque @ 1100-1600RPM
- Power/weight: 24 hp/ton
- Transmission: Allison 4500SP automatic transmission CVRDE-L&T Automatic Transmission (future)
- Suspension: Live axle with independent hydropneumatic suspension
- Ground clearance: 0.45 meters
- Operational range: 500km (Onroad); 250km (Offroad)
- Maximum speed: 100 km/h (62 mph) on road 10 km/h (6.2 mph) in water

The DRDO Wheeled Armoured Platform (WhAP) is a family of eight-wheeled armoured personnel carriers co-developed by the Defence Research and Development Organisation and private industry. It is being developed to replace ageing in-service armoured personnel carriers of the Indian Army.

The first generation of the WhAP was developed Tata Advanced Systems as Tata Kestrel while the second generation is being developed by Mahindra Defence Systems.

== Development ==
=== First generation ===
The Tata Motors reportedly won a bid for the development of an Infantry Combat Vehicle in 2012 beating competitors including Larsen & Toubro and Timoney Technology Limited of Ireland. DRDO funded 50% of the project and introduced the tentative technical specifications of the product. The cost of the vehicle was expected to be around ₹23 crore (equivalent to ₹32 crore or US$3.4 million in 2023). The vehicle after completing the development within 18 months underwent initial mobility trials in early 2014, amphibious trials with hydrojet trials in the summer of 2015 and firing trials in October 2015. This was followed by extreme weather summer trials at Pokhran, Rajasthan in 2016.

The National Centre for Automotive Testing (NCAT) at VRDE and a vehicle track at the Mechanized Infantry Regimental Centre (MIRC), Ahmednagar, were used for on-road and off-road mobility trials under developmental trials. In NCAT's high speed track, the vehicle's performance was tested in two modes, 8×8 and 8×4. It recorded a maximum speed of 104 km/h (65 mph), had an average fuel consumption of 1.3 km/l, and a range of 478 km (297 mi) with full tank diesel. Off-road mobility trials in 8×8 mode including cross-country running with gradient climbing was satisfactorily conducted at MIRC ‘A’ vehicle track followed by cross-country running with gradient climbing at NCAT.

During the DefExpo 2014 exhibition in February in New Delhi, Tata Kestrel was introduced as an indigenous Wheeled Armoured Amphibious Platform concept with an eight-wheel drive configuration. The vehicle was developed in cooperation with the Defence Research and Development Organisation based on modular designs to incorporate further upgrades efficiently. The vehicle on display in 2014 was equipped with two Kongsberg supplied weapon mounts.

In the Defence Expo 2022 convention, the WhAP was showcased by Tata at the Helipad Exhibition Centre.

Kestrel equipped with the BMP-2 turret was introduced and demonstrated at DefExpo 2016.

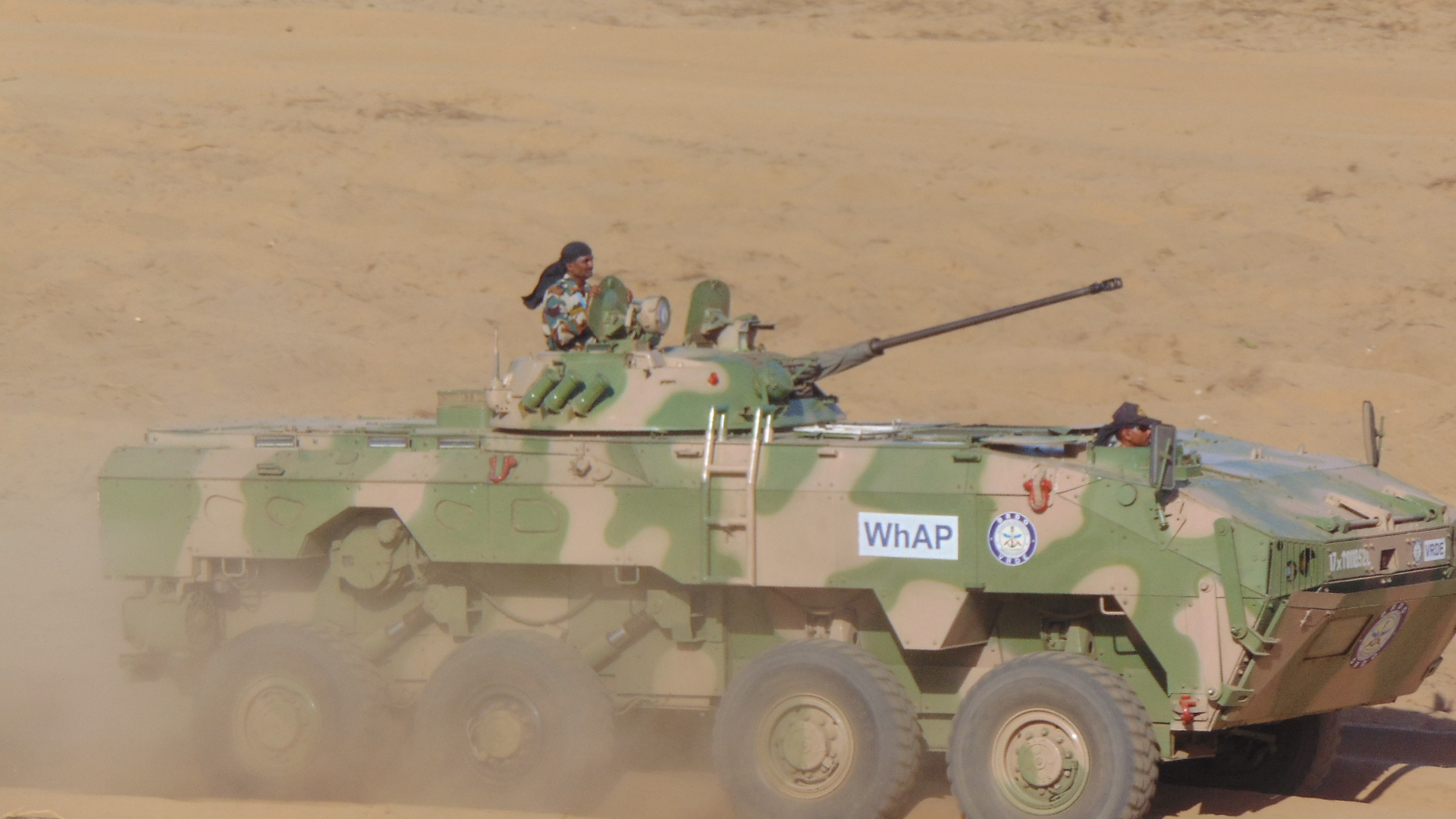
WhAP live demonstration at DefExpo 2018

The vehicle, renamed as WhAP ICV with a BMP-2 turret, was again displayed at DefExpo 2018. WhAP with BMP-2 also participated in live public demonstrations during the exhibition. DRDO also exhibited a WhAP configured with the UT30MK2 unmanned turret from Elbit Systems.

DRDO WhAP 8×8 Amphibious Wheeled Armoured Vehicle is being developed as a common platform for various vehicle type like Wheeled APC, 30 mm ICV, 105 mm Light Tank, command post vehicle, ambulance, special purpose platform, 120 mm mortar carrier, CBRN Vehicle based on the same chassis of Kestrel.

In October 2019, the Indian Ministry of Defence reportedly cleared the Kestrel for production and export to friendly nations. Later the same year, the Indian Army issued an RFI to acquire 198 wheeled (8×8) armoured fighting vehicles for to replace BRDM-2 and equip reconnaissance and support regiments of the mechanised infantry and operate in the plains of Punjab and Rajasthan as well as riverine terrains.

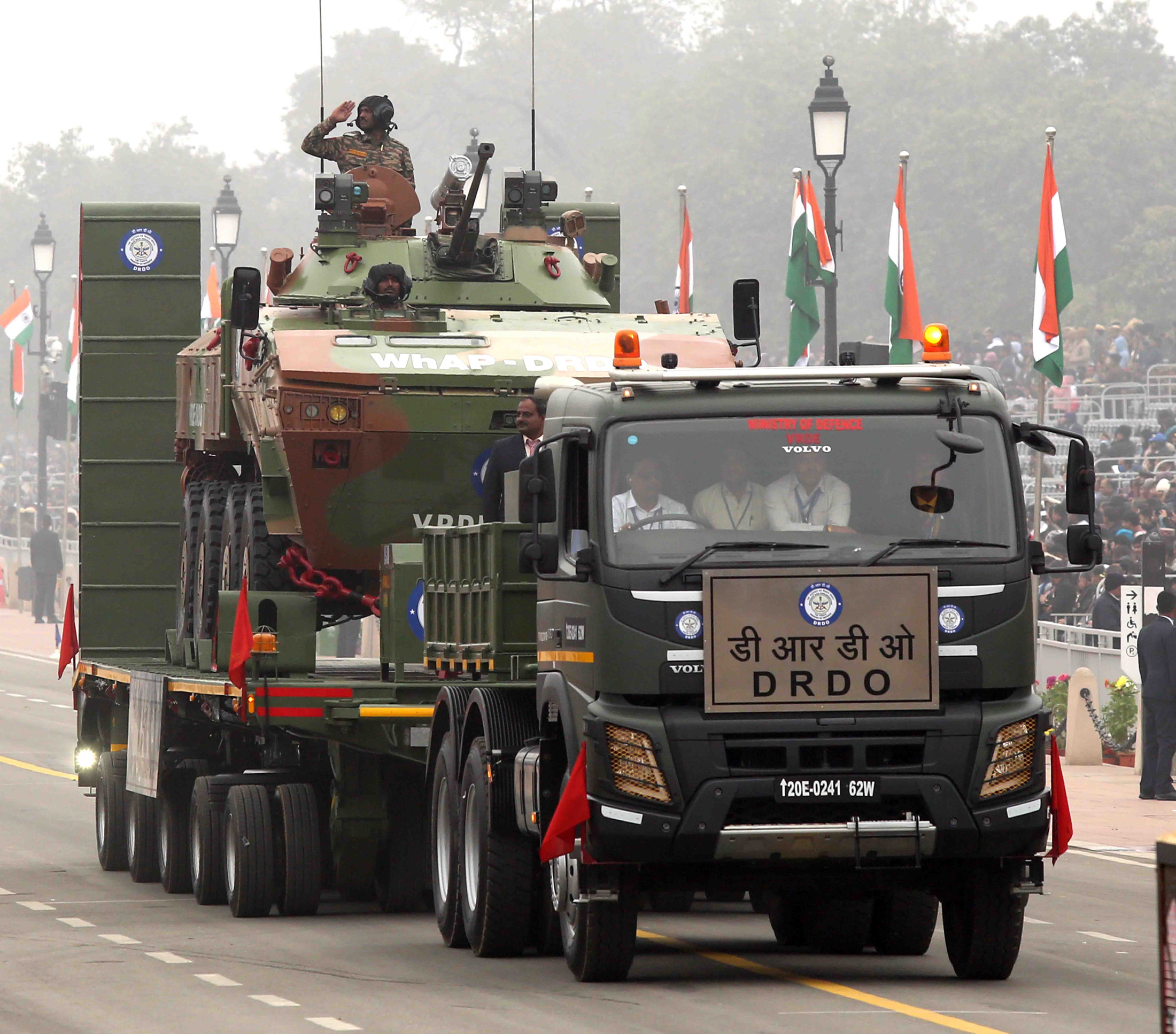
Tata-DRDO WhAP during Delhi Republic Day parade 2023

The DRDO WhAP was exhibited in the Delhi Republic Day parade 2023 as "a modular 8×8 wheeled combat platform" upon a 70 tonne trailer. The vehicle shown was the Armoured Personnel Carrier variant with composite armour, 30 mm turret (BMP-2) and "cutting-edge blast protection".

=== Second generation ===
During a Defence Exhibition held in Pune between 24 and 26 February 2024, the second generation of the Wheeled Armoured Platform (WhAP). The second generation was developed by Mahindra Defence and the DRDO. The CBRN reconnaissance vehicle configuration of the second generation was unveiled. The vehicle can also be modified for multiple roles similar to the first generation including infantry combat vehicle and armoured personnel carrier variants among others. While most of the features in the generation is the same as the earlier one, it incorporates multiple improvements being more compact, lighter, increased ballistic protection and power-to-weight ratio of 26 hp/tonne. It has an amphibious top speed of 8 km/h.

The vehicle operates with a crew of three and is capable of transporting eight soldiers in the IFV and APC configurations.

By February 2024, the vehicle successfully completed developmental trials including land and water mobility trials. As of August 2024, the vehicle was undergoing trials with the Army on various terrains.

== Design ==
DRDO WhAP is designed for modern day warfare and features design philosophies of modularity, scalability and reconfigurability to adopt the platform for variety of roles. The vehicle was designed to adapt to the needs of armoured personnel carrier (APC) for United Nations missions in addition to various other roles using its modular design. The vehicle has been developed into two distinct sections — the base hull and the modular mission payload. The latter can be modified as per the user-specific requirements. This approach was chosen to reduce development time and cost and hence a number of variants can be developed from a single hull design easing logistics and maintenance.

The Kestrel also incorporates multiple smart stealth technologies to evade detection by radar, infrared, sonar, etc. It is designed with limited engine and vehicle sound, thermal footprint, Electromagnetic Interference (EMI) and Electromagnetic Compatibility (EMC). The exhaust gases are run through water to make sure they are cool before being released into the atmosphere, which further lowers the thermal footprint.

The vehicle incorporates INS and GPS as its primary navigation equipment and is also fitted with Modular (UHF, VHF, HF) communication systems.

=== Capacity ===
The vehicle can carry 10 to 12 persons. The driver is seated in the front right beside the engine compartment while the stick or vehicle commander is seated behind the driver. Both are provided with roof hatches while the driver has access to three periscopes for amphibious operations and a panoramic camera system for situational awareness. The gunner and the troop commander is placed under the turret. The troop compartment in the rear hosts six to eight soldiers depending on the variant. It includes a back-to-back seating arrangement with the soldiers facing outward. Anti-blast suspended seats are installed to absorb any shocks and secondary slams, reducing brain and spinal injuries. Every soldier has access to a periscope and a firing port each. The vehicle is equipped with a rear-door ramp for "embarking and disembarking" of troops and two escape hatches. Fuel tanks are placed outside the troop compartment for additional safety.

=== Mobility ===
The WhAP's 8×8 wheel configuration is set on a hydropneumatic suspension utilizing double wishbone arrangement. It has two modes of operation — high-speed mode for normal operation and low-speed mode for better traction capability. Of the four axles, the front two is steerable minimising the turning radius of the vehicle down to 19 metres. It also employs side-mounted hydraulically operated winch for self-recovery.

In addition to a Central Tire Inflation System (CTIS), the vehicle is also equipped with run-flat tires on all wheels so that it can be driven at slower speeds in the event of an unexpected tire deflation. The wheels are feature anti-lock braking system (ABS). As for amphibious operations, the last drive axle is coupled with an amphibious gearing system.

=== Powerpack ===
DRDO WhAP incorporates an integrated power pack (IPP) backed by a 600 hp (450 kW) diesel engine placed on the front left for high power-to-weight ratio for high-altitude operations in mountainous terrains. The IPP includes cutting-edge technology like a fully automatic transmission with a retarder and an engine cooling system with fans powered by hydraulic motors. The power pack now offers the new feature of exhaust gas dilution for a lower thermal signature.

For developmental purpose, the WhAP is powered by the Cummins ISX 600 turbocharger engine. The vehicle is capable of amphibious operations up to a weight of 24 tonnes and is equipped with an anti-surge vane with its hydraulic actuation system to divert the oncoming water flow. Hydrojets in the rear helps in propulsion in the water. The vehicle can achieve a speed of 100 km/h (62 mph) on land and 10 km/h (6.2 mph) on water.

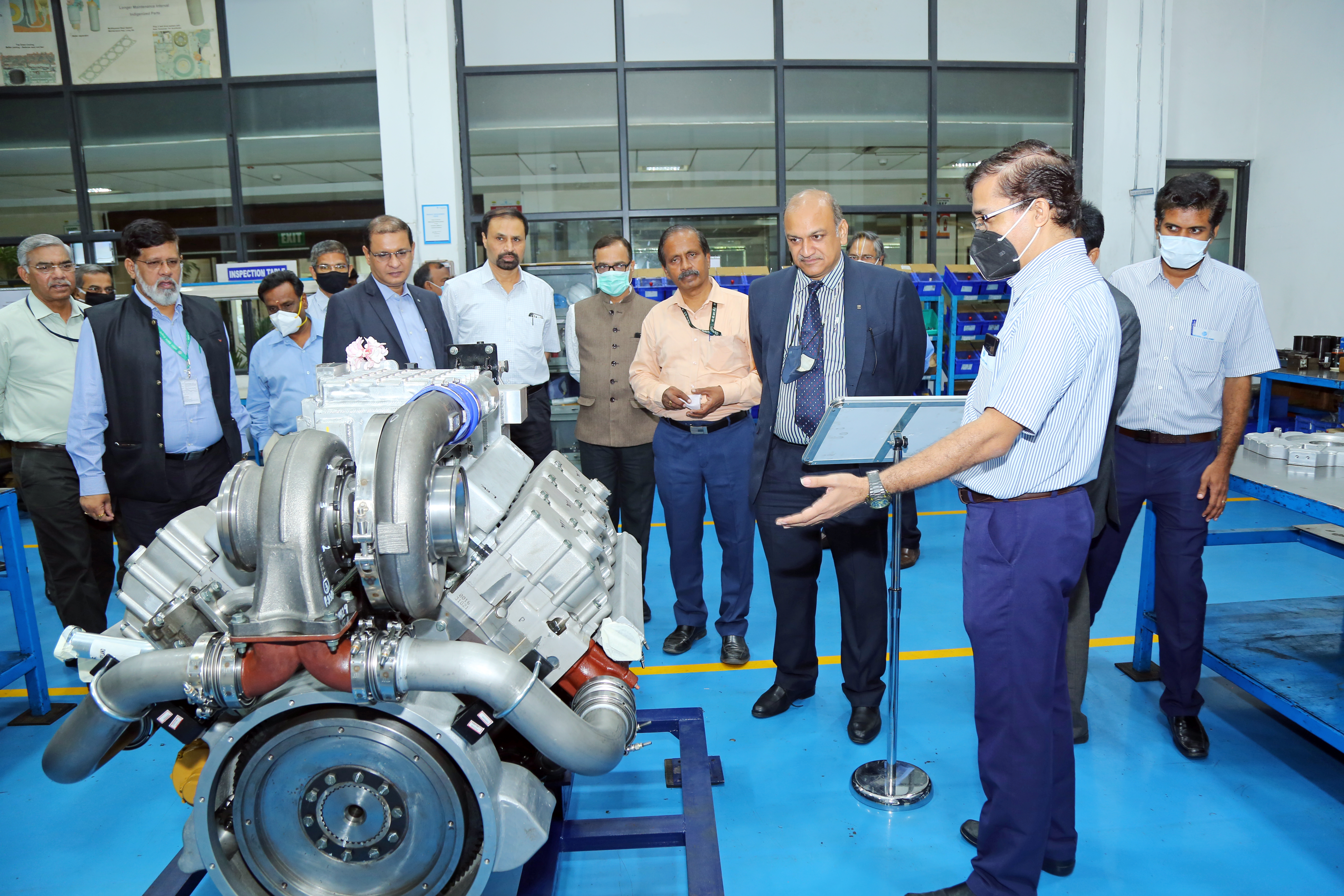
CVRDE 600-hp engine.

The engine would be replaced by an indigenous option. As reported in December 2021, Ashok Leyland has partnered with Combat Vehicles Research and Development Establishment to design, develop and produce a 600-hp indigenous engine for the DRDO WhAP. As per the reports the prototype engine has been manufactured and will undergo rigorous testing in the lab and will be qualified for application in armoured fighting vehicles. Series production is scheduled to begin after operational start-up. The testing was inaugurated in the Engine Development Centre, Ashok Leyland, Vellivoyalchavadi, near Chennai.

=== Protection ===
The hull, based on the composites and steel armour, is constructed from high strength steel with bolted-on ceramic armour. The hull design involves evolved follows a double ‘V’ type bottom configuration consisting of an inner panel and bottom panel. The monocoque of the vehicle includes a welded armour steel hull with applique and inner composite spall liner. This design offers all round protection against 7.62 mm armour piercing rounds as well as land mines. To further reduce the impact of mine explosion, the bottom panel is designed to deflect the shockwave and get further deformed, minimising the blast energy transferred to the vehicle. Blast resistant seats and energy absorbing mats at troop floor interface are also provided to enhance crew safety.

The vehicle provides an overall protection ranging from level I to level III and blast protection up to level III in the bottom under STANAG 4569.

It can also be quickly equipped with an add-on armour for higher threat detterance. The vehicle also has a NBC protection system.

=== Armament ===
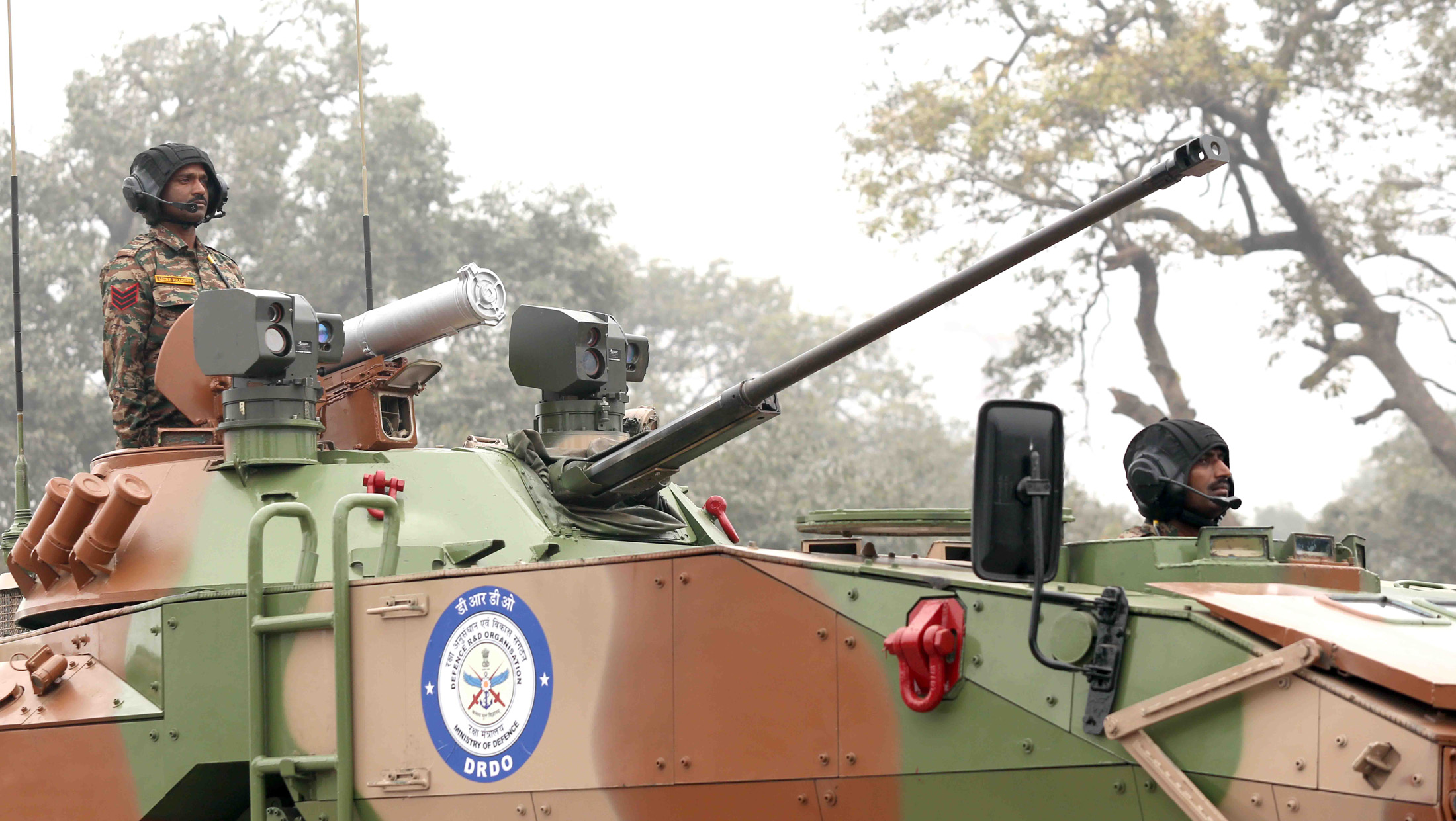
WhAP with BMP-2 turret during Delhi Republic Day parade 2023

The Tata-DRDO WhAP or Kestrel has been unveiled in multiple weapon configurations.

- Configuration 1 (2014): Roof-mounted remote controlled Kongsberg Protector MCT-30R (RWS) equipped with a 30×113 mm autocannon (effective range of 3,000 m), 7.62×51 mm coaxial machine gun and two Javelin anti-tank guided missile launcher with an option for a 40 mm automatic grenade launcher.
- Configuration 2 (2016): BMP-2 turret equipped with a 30 mm 2A42 autocannon and 7.62 mm PKT coaxial machine gun (2,000 rounds) mounted to the left of the cannon. The version is also fitted with an ATGM launcher. WhAP with this in-service turret underwent firing trials at KK Range, Ahmednagar. Both the autocannon with 30x165mm AP (T) rounds and the 7.62×54mmR medium machine gun successfully hit its targets at a range of 1,100 metres.
- Configuration 3 (2018): Elbit Systems UT30MK2 unmanned turret equipped with Mk44 Bushmaster II, a 7.62 coaxial gun and an integrated anti-tank guided missile carrier launcher.
- IPMV configuration: 7.62mm remote controlled medium machine gun.

== Service history ==
=== Indian service ===
As tensions continued to escalate between India and China over the de facto Line of Actual Control, DRDO-TATA Kestrel (WhAP), landed at Ladakh to undergo cold-weather trials in October 2021. The first batch of WhAPs were inducted into the army on 12 April 2022 at Bombay Engineer Group (BEG) and Centre, Pune by the then Chief of the Army Staff (COAS), General Manoj Mukund Naravane.

WhAP was inducted into the Central Reserve Police Force's 110 Battalion at Pulwama, Kashmir in August 2023.

Reportedly, as of August 2024, the Army is planning to order another batch of 105 WhAPs from Tata Advanced Systems (TASL).

=== Exports ===
On 27 September 2024, Morocco's Ministry of National Defense signed a contract with TASL for the domestic production of 150 WhAP 8×8 armored combat vehicles for the Royal Moroccan Armed Forces. As part of the contract, TASL Morocco (fully owned subsidiary of TASL) will set up a 20,000 m^{2} (4.9 acres) final assembly line at Casablanca which will be operationalised within 12 months, followed by roll out within 18 months and completion of deliveries within 36 months from contract signing. The vehicle to be produced at a rate of 100 units annually will have a local integration rate of 35% which will further rise to 50%. The project is anticipated to create 90 direct and 250 indirect jobs. Ministers from National Defense, Interior, Finance, Industry, and Investment, as well as representatives from the FAR General Staff and the Moroccan Agency for Investment and Export Development (AMDIE), signed the agreement, which offers financial, fiscal, and customs incentives.

Following the completion of deliveries to Morocco, the same production plant can also be used to export the product to other countries in Africa.

The vehicle had undergone extensive trials in Morocco since few months earlier. The project will mark the establishment of the first major and the largest defence production plant in Morocco as well as the first such overseas facility by an Indian defence manufacturer. To contribute to vehicle modifications during the supply period, the manufacturers will collaborate closely with the DRDO.

In November 2024, it was reported that during field tests, the WhAP outclassed the Type 08.

On 23 September 2025, Indian Defence Minister Rajnath Singh and Moroccan Defence Minister Abdellatif Loudiyi together inaugurated the state-of-the-art, 20,000 m^{2} (4.9 acres) production facility of WhAP in Berrechid, Morocco. While the facility was operationalised three months ahead of schedule, production has already commenced with initial deliveries expected to begin in October. The initial indigenous content of the Moroccan WhAP will be 33%, the same is expected to increase to 50% over the years.

The first batch of five WhAPs was delivered to the Moroccan Army on 24 December 2025.

=== Interests ===
In January 2026, the Hellenic Army has expressed interest in the WhAP to meet its armoured requirements and is potentially evaluating the platform.

== Variants ==
Planned variants include ambulance, NBC recon, Command Post and Engineer vehicle.

- Wheeled Armoured Platform (WhAP) : Base variant. Wheeled Infantry Fighting Vehicle equipped with autocannon turret (primarily BMP-2).
- Infantry Protected Mobility Vehicle (IPMV) : Armoured personnel carrier equipped with a 7.62mm remote controlled medium machine gun. Primary user: Indian Army.
- Paramilitary variant : IPMV variant for paramilitary operations. Primary user: Central Reserve Police Force.
- CBRN variant : Based on second generation WhAP; CBRN reconnaissance vehicle variant.

== Operators ==
=== Current operators ===
India

- Indian Army: 36 IPMVs operational; Further 105 units planned. Deployed in Leh sector.
- Central Reserve Police Force: 6 IPMVs operational
  - 110 battalion, Pulwama, Kashmir

Morocco

- Royal Moroccan Army: 8 delivered. 150 on order. Signed contract indicate delivery of all vehicles in three years.

=== Failed bids ===
Philippines

- Philippine Marine Corps: Tata Advanced Systems Ltd. submitted a bid in May 2026 for a requirement for an initial 5 units, fitted for peacekeeping operations. Bidding was won by Thailand's Chaiseri Metal & Rubber Co. Ltd. with its Chaiseri AWAV.

== See also ==
- Abhay IFV
- Stryker
- Type 08
