= Satellites of Albania =

== Earth-observation satellites ==
Satellite	Developed/Built by	Launch Date	Launch site	Launcher	Mass	Status	Note
Albania-1 (ÑuSat 32)	(Argentina) Satellogic	3 January 2023	(United States) Cape Canaveral	(United States) Falcon 9	38 kg (84 lb)	In Service	Used to detect crimes such as drug cultivation, illegal construction and logging
Albania-2 (ÑuSat 33)	(Argentina) Satellogic	3 January 2023	(United States) Cape Canaveral	(United States) Falcon 9	38 kg (84 lb)	In Service	Used to detect crimes such as drug cultivation, illegal construction and logging
