= ÑuSat =

Series of Argentinean commercial Earth observation satellites

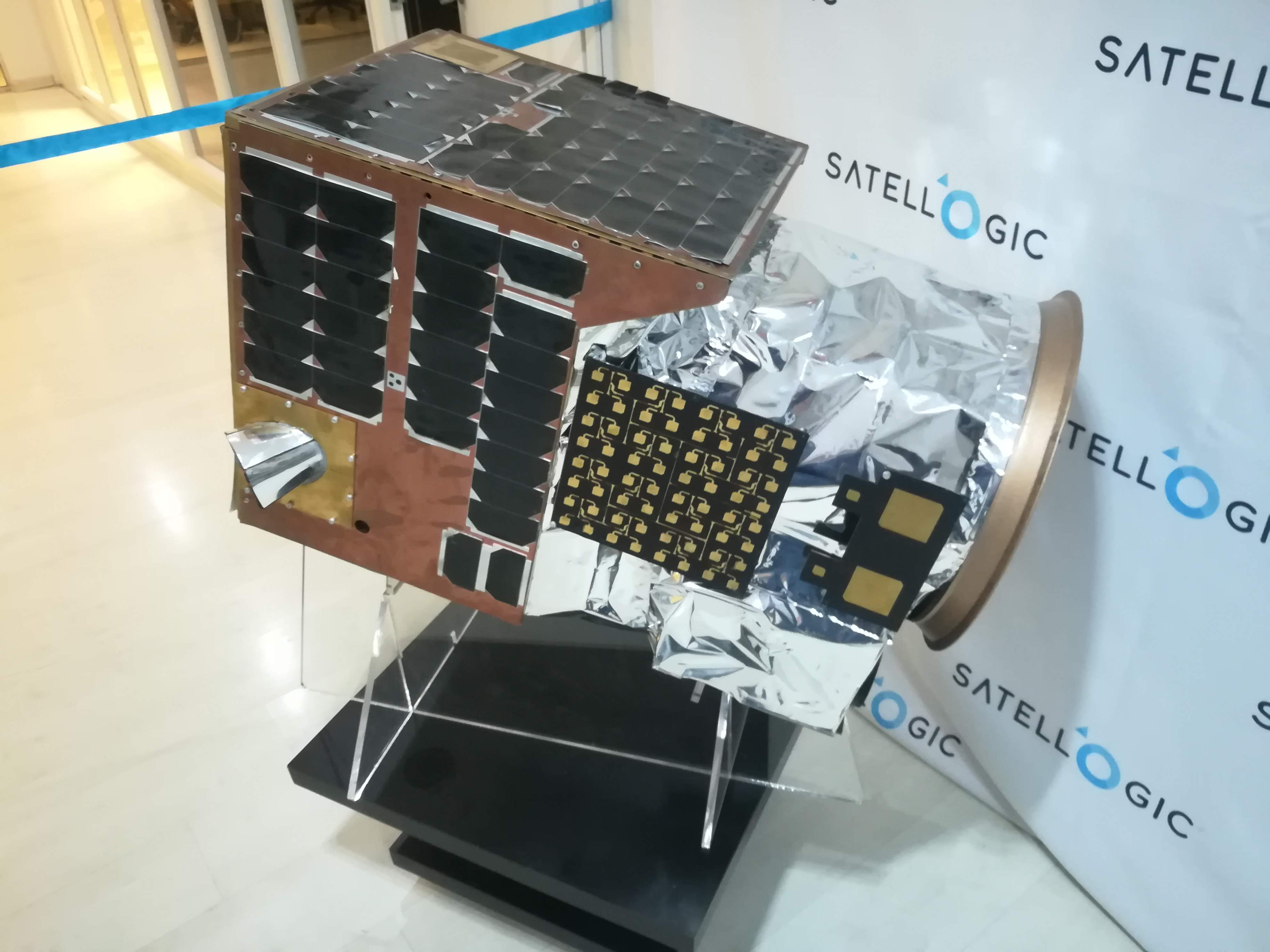
- Mission type: Commercial Earth observation
- Operator: Satellogic S.A.
- Website: www.satellogic.com
- Mission duration: 3 years (planned)

Spacecraft properties
- Bus: Small Satellite
- Manufacturer: Satellogic
- Launch mass: 38.5 kg (85 lb); 41 kg (ÑuSat 9-18)

Start of mission
- Launch date: 30 May 2016 UTC (1st, 2nd); 15 June 2017 (3rd); 2 February 2018 (4th, 5th); 15 January 2020 (7th, 8th); 2 September 2020 (6th); 6 November 2020 UTC (9th-18th); 30 June 2021 (19th-22nd); 1 April 2022 (23rd-27th); 25 May 2022 (28th-31st); 3 January 2023 (32nd-35th); 15 April 2023 (36th-39th); 12 June 2023 (40th-43rd); 4 March 2024 (44th); 16 August 2024 (45th-47th)
- Rocket: Long March 4B, Long March 2D, Vega, Long March 6, Falcon 9 Block 5
- Launch site: Taiyuan, Jiuquan, Kourou, Cape Canaveral

ÑuSat satellite series (Spanish: ÑuSat, sometimes translated into English as NewSat) is a series of Argentinean commercial Earth observation satellites. They form the Aleph-1 constellation, which is designed, built and operated by Satellogic.

== Overview ==
=== Satellites design ===
The satellites in the constellation are identical 51 × 57 × 82 cm spacecraft of 38.5 kg (85 lb) mass. The satellites are equipped with an imaging system operating in visible light and infrared. The constellation will allow for commercially available real-time Earth imaging and video with a ground resolution of 1 m (3 ft 3 in). The satellites were developed based on the experience gained on the BugSat 1 prototype satellite.

==== BugSat 1 ====
The BugSat 1 (nickname Tita) was a technology demonstration mission for the ÑuSat satellites. It was launched on 19 June 2014 by a Russian Dnepr rocket. It was a microsatellite weighing 22 kg with outer dimensions of 27.5 × 50 × 50 cm. It also carried amateur radio capabilities.

=== Missions ===
The Aleph-1 constellation will consist of more than 300 satellites. The first two satellites were launched as piggy-back payloads on a Chinese Long March 4B rocket in May 2016 from the Taiyuan Satellite Launch Center into a 500 km Sun-synchronous orbit with an inclination of 97.5°. The third satellite was launched as a piggy-back payload on a Long March 4B launch vehicle in June 2017. The fourth and fifth satellites were launched as piggy-backs on a Long March 2D rocket in February 2018. The sixth satellite was launched on a rideshare mission on a Vega rocket in September 2020. Satellites number seven and eight were launched as piggy-backs on a Long March 2D rocket in January 2020. Satellites number 9-18 were launched on a Long March 6 launch vehicle on 6 November 2020.

=== Ground communications ===
An U/V transponder with 2 watts of output power for 8 GHz downlink and 2 GHz uplink will be operating on 100 kHz bandwidth.

=== LabOSat / MeMOSat payloads ===
MeMOSat, developed by the LabOSat Group, designed and built by a group of scientists at the National Atomic Energy Commission (Spanish: Comisión Nacional de Energía Atómica (CNEA)), the National Institute of Industrial Technology (Spanish: Instituto Nacional de Tecnología Industrial (INTI)), the National University of General San Martín (Spanish: Universidad Nacional de San Martín (UNSAM)) and National Scientific and Technical Research Council (CONICET).

This memory was specially designed to operate in harsh environments and adverse conditions, such as the strong radiation it must withstand in space. Its main objective is to test electronic components that will be commercialized in the future. To do this, the memory is made up of two metallic films with an oxide between about 20 nm thick, with electrical resistance properties, that can send information from the satellites, allowing to study their behavior in these hostile environments.

=== AMSAT payload ===
Additionally, ÑuSat-1 carries a U/V linear transponder called LUSEX provided by AMSAT Argentina (AMSAT-LU) to offer services to the HAM community.

== List of satellites ==
Although the satellites are officially named "ÑuSat", each satellite has a nickname, a tradition from Satellogic that dates back since its very first satellite Fresco.

| Name | Nickname | COSPAR | In homage to | Launch date | Launch vehicle | Outcome | Remarks |
|---|---|---|---|---|---|---|---|
| ÑuSat 1 (Aleph-1 1, Lusat-OSCAR 87, LO 87) | Fresco | 2016-033B | Queso fresco (alongside Batata, they make the traditional Argentinian dessert "Fresco y Batata") | 30 May 2016 | Long March 4B | Success | First commercial small satellite from Argentina. |
| ÑuSat 2 (Aleph-1 2) | Batata | 2016-033C | Dulce de batata (alongside Fresco, they make the traditional Argentinian dessert "Fresco y Batata") | 30 May 2016 | Long March 4B | Success | First commercial small satellite from Argentina. |
| ÑuSat 3 (Aleph-1 3) | Milanesat | 2017-034C | Milanesa | 15 June 2017 | Long March 4B | Success | Nickname proposed by a Reddit user |
| ÑuSat 4 (Aleph-1 4) | Ada | 2018-015D | Ada Lovelace | 2 February 2018 | Long March 2D | Success | |
| ÑuSat 5 (Aleph-1 5) | Maryam | 2018-015K | Maryam Mirzakhani | 2 February 2018 | Long March 2D | Success | |
| ÑuSat 6 (Aleph-1 6) | Hypatia | 2020-061A | Hypatia | 3 September 2020 | Vega | Success | |
| ÑuSat 7 (Aleph-1 7) | Sophie | 2020-003B | Sophie Germain | 15 January 2020 | Long March 2D | Success | |
| ÑuSat 8 (Aleph-1 8) | Marie | 2020-003C | Marie Curie | 15 January 2020 | Long March 2D | Success | |
| ÑuSat 9 (Aleph-1 9) | Alice | 2020-079A | Alice Ball | 6 November 2020, 03:19 UTC | Long March 6 | Success | |
| ÑuSat 10 (Aleph-1 10) | Caroline | 2020-079B | Caroline Herschel | 6 November 2020, 03:19 UTC | Long March 6 | Success | |
| ÑuSat 11 (Aleph-1 11) | Cora | 2020-079C | Cora Ratto | 6 November 2020, 03:19 UTC | Long March 6 | Success | |
| ÑuSat 12 (Aleph-1 12) | Dorothy | 2020-079D | Dorothy Vaughan | 6 November 2020, 03:19 UTC | Long March 6 | Success | |
| ÑuSat 13 (Aleph-1 13) | Emmy | 2020-079E | Emmy Noether | 6 November 2020, 03:19 UTC | Long March 6 | Success | |
| ÑuSat 14 (Aleph-1 14) | Hedy | 2020-079F | Hedy Lamarr | 6 November 2020, 03:19 UTC | Long March 6 | Success | |
| ÑuSat 15 (Aleph-1 15) | Katherine | 2020-079G | Katherine Johnson | 6 November 2020, 03:19 UTC | Long March 6 | Success | |
| ÑuSat 16 (Aleph-1 16) | Lise | 2020-079H | Lise Meitner | 6 November 2020, 03:19 UTC | Long March 6 | Success | |
| ÑuSat 17 (Aleph-1 17) | Mary | 2020-079J | Mary Jackson | 6 November 2020, 03:19 UTC | Long March 6 | Success | |
| ÑuSat 18 (Aleph-1 18) | Vera | 2020-079K | Vera Rubin | 6 November 2020, 03:19 UTC | Long March 6 | Success | |
| ÑuSat 19 (Aleph-1 19) | Rosalind | 2021-059AC | Rosalind Franklin | 30 June 2021, 19:31 UTC | Falcon 9 Block 5 | Success | |
| ÑuSat 20 (Aleph-1 20) | Grace | 2021-059AU | Grace Hopper | 30 June 2021, 19:31 UTC | Falcon 9 Block 5 | Success | Decayed on 11 November 2023. |
| ÑuSat 21 (Aleph-1 21) | Elisa | 2021-059AT | Elisa Bachofen | 30 June 2021, 19:31 UTC | Falcon 9 Block 5 | Success | Decayed on 26 October 2023. |
| ÑuSat 22 (Aleph-1 22) | Sofya | 2021-059AS | Sofya Kovalevskaya | 30 June 2021, 19:31 UTC | Falcon 9 Block 5 | Success | |
| ÑuSat 23 (Aleph-1 23) | Annie Maunder | 2022-033M | Annie Maunder | 1 April 2022, 16:24 UTC | Falcon 9 Block 5 | Success | |
| ÑuSat 24 (Aleph-1 25) | Kalpana Chawla | 2022-033X | Kalpana Chawla | 1 April 2022, 16:24 UTC | Falcon 9 Block 5 | Success | |
| ÑuSat 25 (Aleph-1 25) | Maria Telkes | 2022-033Q | Maria Telkes | 1 April 2022, 16:24 UTC | Falcon 9 Block 5 | Success | |
| ÑuSat 26 (Aleph-1 26) | Mary Somerville | 2022-033 | Mary Somerville | 1 April 2022, 16:24 UTC | Falcon 9 Block 5 | Success | |
| ÑuSat 27 (Aleph-1 27) | Sally Ride | 2022-033R | Sally Ride | 1 April 2022, 16:24 UTC | Falcon 9 Block 5 | Success | |
| ÑuSat-28 (Aleph-1 28) | Alice Lee | 2022-057R | Alice Lee | 25 May 2022, 18:35 UTC | Falcon 9 Block 5 | Success | |
| ÑuSat-29 (Aleph-1 29) | Edith Clarke | 2022-057AJ | Edith Clarke | 25 May 2022, 18:35 UTC | Falcon 9 Block 5 | Success | |
| ÑuSat-30 (Aleph-1 30) | Margherita Hack | 2022-057S | Margherita Hack | 25 May 2022, 18:35 UTC | Falcon 9 Block 5 | Success | |
| ÑuSat-31 (Aleph-1 31) | Ruby Payne-Scott | 2022-057W | Ruby Payne-Scott | 25 May 2022, 18:35 UTC | Falcon 9 Block 5 | Success | |
| ÑuSat-32 (Aleph-1 32) | Albania-1 | 2023-001BH | | 3 January 2023, 14:56 UTC | Falcon 9 Block 5 | Success | First Albanian satellites, developed in collaboration with the Albanian government |
| ÑuSat-33 (Aleph-1 33) | Albania-2 | 2023-001AQ | | 3 January 2023, 14:56 UTC | Falcon 9 Block 5 | Success | First Albanian satellites, developed in collaboration with the Albanian government |
| ÑuSat-34 (Aleph-1 34) | Amelia Earhart | 2023-001AN | Amelia Earhart | 3 January 2023, 14:56 UTC | Falcon 9 Block 5 | Success | |
| ÑuSat-35 (Aleph-1 35) | Williamina Fleming | 2023-001AR | Williamina Fleming | 3 January 2023, 14:56 UTC | Falcon 9 Block 5 | Success | |
| ÑuSat-36 (Aleph-1 36) | Annie Jump Cannon | 2023-054N | Annie Jump Cannon | 15 April 2023, 06:48 UTC | Falcon 9 Block 5 | Success | |
| ÑuSat-37 (Aleph-1 37) | Joan Clarke | 2023-054AB | Joan Clarke | 15 April 2023, 06:48 UTC | Falcon 9 Block 5 | Success | |
| ÑuSat-38 (Aleph-1 38) | Maria Gaetana Agnesi | 2023-054AA | Maria Gaetana Agnesi | 15 April 2023, 06:48 UTC | Falcon 9 Block 5 | Success | |
| ÑuSat-39 (Aleph-1 39) | Tikvah Alper | 2023-054Z | Tikvah Alper | 15 April 2023, 06:48 UTC | Falcon 9 Block 5 | Success | |
| ÑuSat-40 (Aleph-1 40) | Carolyn Shoemaker | 2023-084M | Carolyn S. Shoemaker | 12 June 2023, 21:35 UTC | Falcon 9 Block 5 | Success | |
| ÑuSat-41 (Aleph-1 41) | Cecilia Payne-Gaposchkin | 2023-084N | Cecilia Payne-Gaposchkin | 12 June 2023, 21:35 UTC | Falcon 9 Block 5 | Success | |
| ÑuSat-42 (Aleph-1 42) | María Wonenburger | 2023-084AL | Maria Wonenburger | 12 June 2023, 21:35 UTC | Falcon 9 Block 5 | Success | |
| ÑuSat-43 (Aleph-1 43) | Rose Dieng-Kuntz | 2023-084AN | Rose Dieng-Kuntz | 12 June 2023, 21:35 UTC | Falcon 9 Block 5 | Success | |
| ÑuSat-44 (Aleph-1 44) | Maria Mitchell | 2024-043AA | Maria Mitchell | 4 March 2024 | Falcon 9 Block 5 | Success | |
| ÑuSat-45 (Aleph-1 45) | UzmaSAT-1 | 2025-009AH | | 15 January 2025 | Falcon 9 Block 5 | Success | Ceded to Uzma |
| ÑuSat-48 (Aleph-1 48) | Henrietta Leavitt | 2024-149AG | Henrietta Leavitt | 16 August 2024 | Falcon 9 Block 5 | Success | |
| ÑuSat-49 (Aleph-1 49) | Klára Dán von Neumann | 2024-149AJ | Klára Dán von Neumann | 16 August 2024 | Falcon 9 Block 5 | Success | |
| ÑuSat-50 (Aleph-1 50) | Nancy Roman | 2024-149AB | Nancy Roman | 16 August 2024 | Falcon 9 Block 5 | Success | |

== Gallery ==
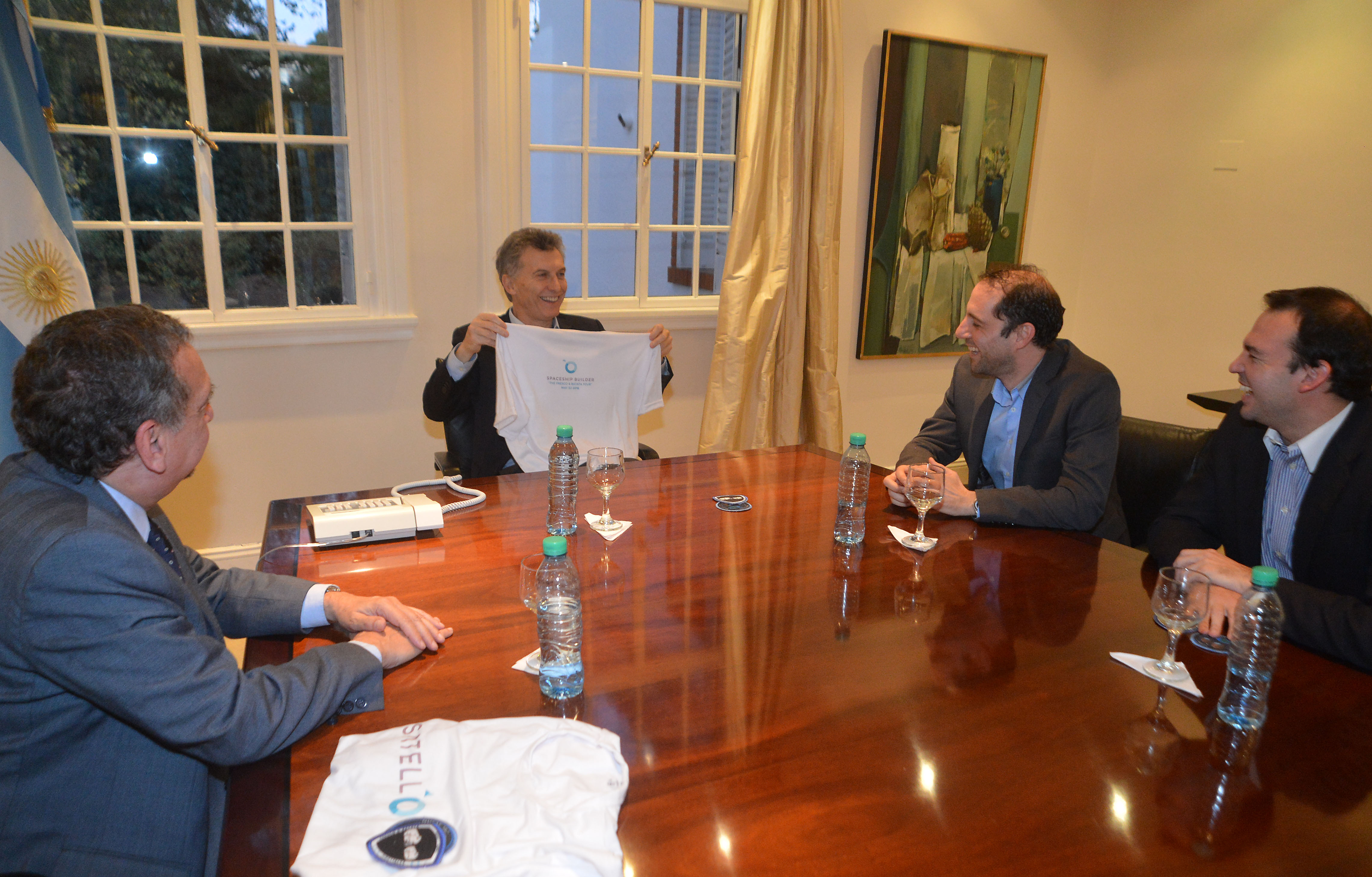
Mauricio Macri alongside Satellogic directives after the launch of Fresco and Batata

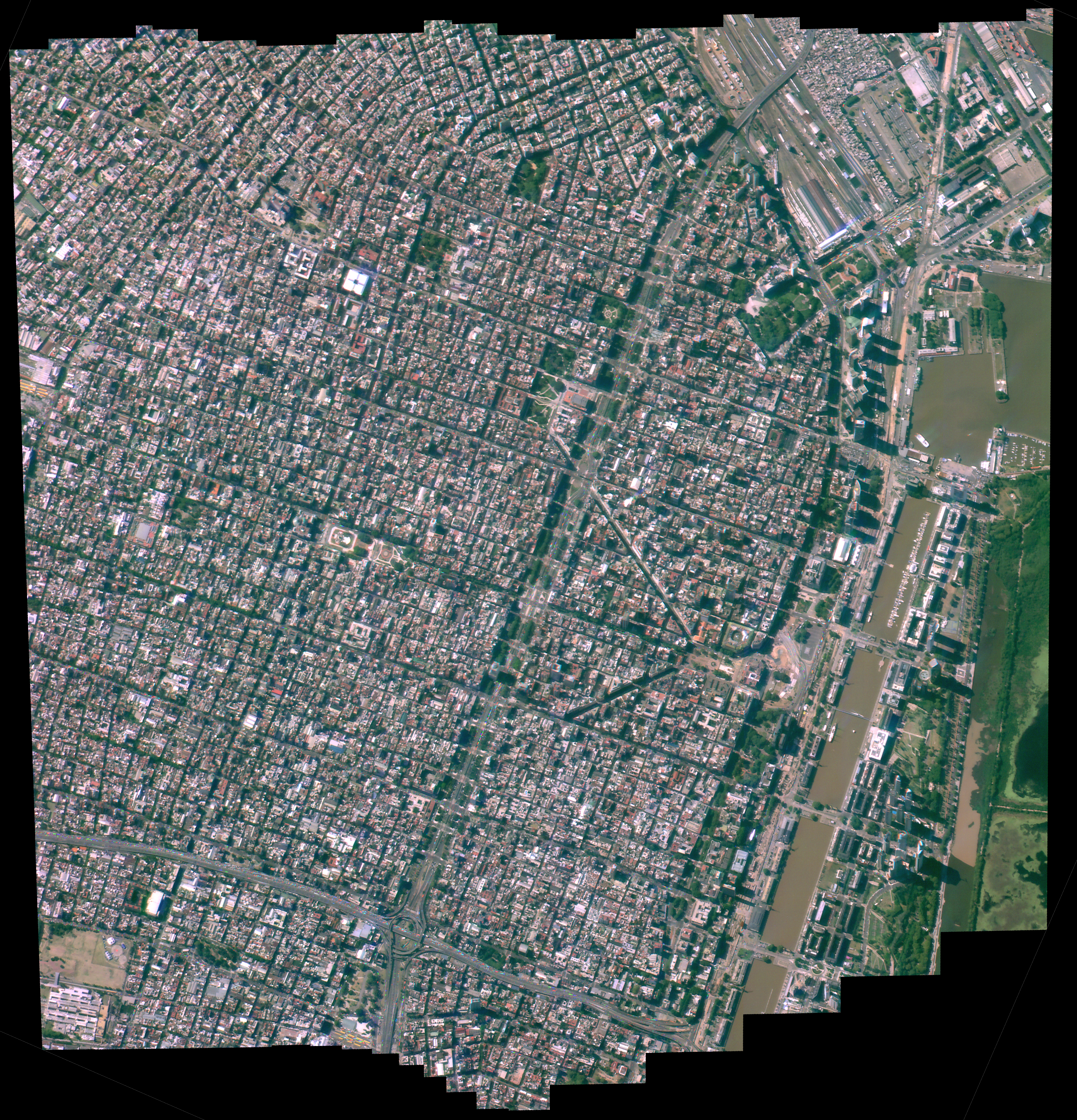
Buenos Aires as seen from one of the ÑuSat satellites

== See also ==
- Satellogic
- Planet Labs
- Spire Global
