= Tata Advanced Systems =

Indian aerospace and military manufacturer

Tata Advanced Systems Limited
- Type: Subsidiary
- Industry: Aerospace and Defence
- Founded: 2007; 19 years ago
- Headquarters: Hyderabad, Telangana, India
- Area served: India
- Key people: Banmali Agrawala (Chairman); Sukaran Singh (MD & CEO)
- Products: Aerostructures; Aero-engines; Fixed-wing aircraft; Fuel cell; Rotorcraft; Avionics; Armoured vehicles; Infantry fighting vehicles; Artillery weapons; Missile launchers; Radar and Sonar systems; Command and control systems; Unmanned aerial systems; Optronics; Security systems; Rugged systems; Portable fuel cells
- Revenue: ▲₹5,176 crore (US$540 million) (FY24)
- Net income: ▲₹177 crore (US$18 million) (FY24)
- Number of employees: 7978
- Parent: Tata Sons (100%)
- Website: www.tataadvancedsystems.com

Tata Advanced Systems Limited (TASL) is an Indian aerospace, military engineering and defence technology company. It is a fully owned subsidiary of Tata Sons, a holding company for the Tata Group.

== History ==
The company was established in 2006 as Tata Systems and Technologies Limited and renamed to Tata Advanced Systems Limited in 2008.

TASL entered into a joint venture with Sikorsky Aircraft Corporation to manufacture the Sikorsky S-92 helicopter in India for the domestic civil and military markets. The plan was to have a US$200 million manufacturing plant operational in Hyderabad by 2010. As production began, the first S-92 cabin was delivered in November 2010, and capacity was expected to increase to 36–48 cabins a year. By the end of July 2013, 39 cabins had been assembled.

The joint venture with Sikorsky has since been expanded to include the development of aerospace components for other original equipment manufacturers (OEMs). This facility, called Tara, also located in Hyderabad, was completed in 2011 and commenced production in 2012. Another TASL joint-venture, with Lockheed Martin, is producing aero structures for the Lockheed C-130 Hercules and the Lockheed C-130J Super Hercules in India. It is a 74:26 joint venture which currently assembles Hercules centre wing boxes and empennages. TASL will also establish a MRO facility in India of the C-130J. TASL's joint venture with Lockheed Martin is named Tata Lockheed Martin Aerostructures.

In partnership with Airbus Defence and Space, the company fielded the EADS CASA C-295 medium–lift tactical transport aircraft for the Indian Air Force's light-cargo fleet renewal programme, which the Indian government approved on 13 May 2015. Under the agreement, Tata Advanced Systems has been selected as the Indian Production Agency (IPA) by Airbus DS. Under the project, 16 complete aircraft will be imported, while 40 aircraft will be manufactured in India. The Final Assembly Line (FAL) complex was inaugurated in October 2024. The first ‘Make in India’ C295 will roll out of the Vadodara FAL in September 2026. The company has also entered an agreement to produce structures for the Pilatus PC-12NG from 2016 to 2026.

The aerospace and military division of Tata Motors was sold to Tata Advanced Systems on May 3, 2018. Lockheed Martin declared in September 2018 that, in partnership with TASL, it would manufacture wings for the General Dynamics F-16 Fighting Falcon. Inaugurated in 2018, the Hyderabad facility of Tata Boeing Aerospace Limited (TBAL), a joint venture between Boeing and Tata Advanced Systems, will serve as the exclusive global manufacturer of fuselages for AH-64 Apache helicopters supplied by Boeing to its clientele worldwide. On 10 February 2025, TBAL delivered the 300th fuselage for the AH-64 Apache from its facility in Hyderabad.

In 2018, TASL established the Tata Centre of Excellence for Aero Engines to manufacture LEAP engine components in India for CFM International, a joint venture between GE Aerospace and Safran Aircraft Engines. Tata Power SED was purchased by Tata Advanced Systems from Tata Power in 2020.

In early 2021, it was reported that Tata Advanced Systems of India had likely bought the intellectual property rights of the Grob G180 SPn aircraft for the development of a military variant to be offered to the Indian army as a signals intelligence gathering and surveillance platform. In February 2021, Lockheed Martin announced that they are teaming with Tata Advanced Systems for meeting the Indian Navy's proposed requirement for Naval Utility Helicopter (NUH). In September 2021 India has signed deal of buying C-295 Cargo aircraft and that will be made by Tata Advanced System. In 2022, TASL and GE Aerospace extended their long-term contract for the production and supply of various commercial aircraft engine components, which are to be manufactured at the Tata Centre of Excellence for Aero Engines.

On 29 March 2023, TASL was awarded a contract from Airbus to supply cargo and bulk cargo doors for the A320neo family. They will be manufactured at a new facility in Hyderabad, which will deploy advanced robotics and automation for the task. Each shipset would include two cargo doors and one bulk cargo door.

In 2024, Tata Advanced Systems announced that the company and Lockheed Martin are looking at further opportunities in India. This includes establishing a maintenance, repair and overhaul (MRO) facility in India to support the IAF's fleet of 12 C-130Js and other global Super Hercules fleets. It also includes expanding the C-130J manufacturing and assembly in India to produce aircraft for the IAF's Medium Transport Aircraft programme, which subject to U.S. government and Indian government approvals.

Following an armoured vehicle contract from the Royal Moroccan Armed Forces in 2024, Tata Advanced Systems will establish a plant in Casablanca. The first WhAPs are expected to be rolled out in 18 months, with the intention of catering to the broader African market. The production facility, which will be operational within a year, will be able to produce 100 combat vehicles yearly. In December 2024, TASL doubled the company's landholding in Nagpur’s MIHAN SEZ to 60 acres for expanding its aerospace manufacturing operations. TASL's existing Nagpur facility manufactures aircraft floor beams for both Boeing and Airbus at the same facility.

In April 2025, the company acquired land in Karnataka's Vemgal Industrial Area for setting up a final assembly line for aircraft manufacturing and MRO. Four production transfer agreements were signed on 5 June 2025, between Dassault Aviation and Tata Advanced Systems to manufacture the Rafale fighter aircraft fuselage in Hyderabad. This includes the front section, the central fuselage, the rear fuselage, and the lateral shells of the rear fuselage for India and other international markets.

== Major programmes ==
- Licence production of the C-295 in a JV with Airbus Defence and Space.
- Design, development and production of the TATA Kestrel for Indian Army.
- Upgradation and modernisation of 37 airfields across Air Force Stations, Naval Stations, and Coast Guard Civil Enclaves.
- Production and maintenance of the Pinaka Multi Barrel Rocket launchers, command posts and other support vehicles for Indian Army.
- Production and Maintenance of the Akash SAM launchers, command posts and other support vehicles for IAF.
- Production and maintenance of the MRSAM launchers, command posts and other support vehicles for IAF.
- Production and maintenance of the control systems for the Arihant-class submarine.
- Production and development of the Advanced Towed Artillery Gun System for Indian Army
- Design, development, and production of the Portable Diver Detection Sonar.
- Production and maintenance for the PDV Mk-II launcher.
- Development of the Advanced Loitering System-250 (ALS-250), a kamikaze drone with a range of 250 km with high payload capacity for munitions like anti-tank warhead.
- Development of the unmanned medium-altitude long-endurance UAV variant of the Grob G180 SPn.
- production of 400 ‘Made in India’ Apache attack helicopter fuselage.

== Products and services ==
=== Military vehicles ===
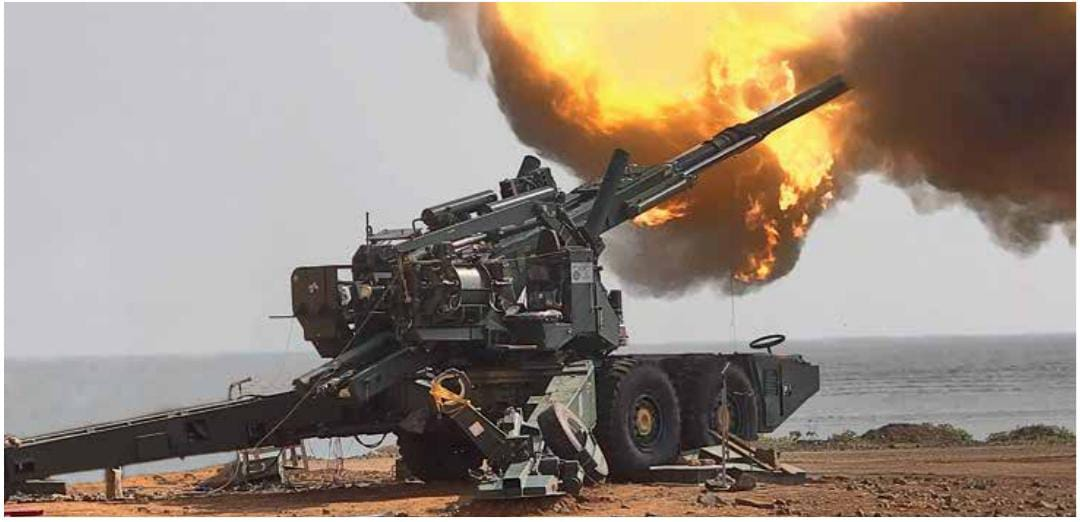
ATAGS towed-howitzer jointly developed by Tata Advanced Systems and DRDO.

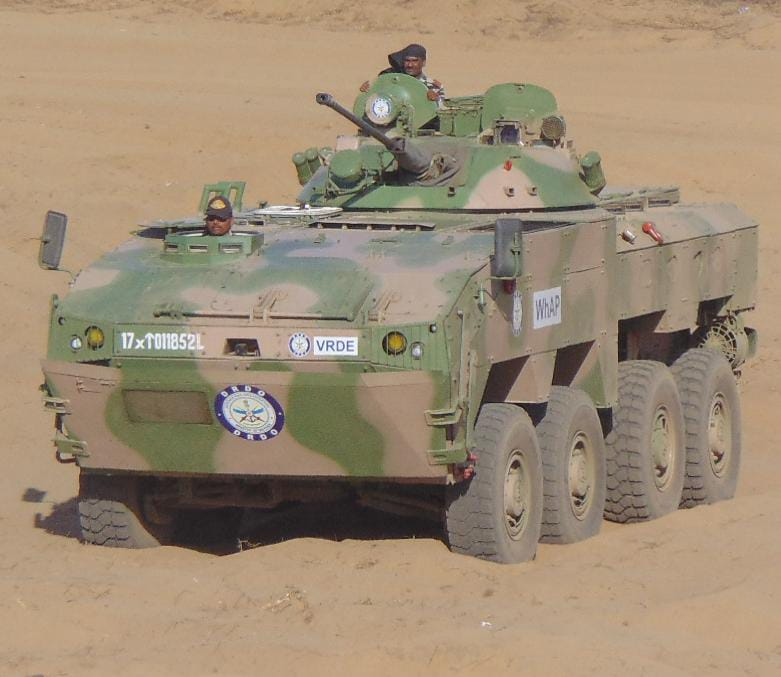
TATA Kestrel

- Tata LSV (Light Specialist Vehicle)
- Tata Mine Protected Vehicle (4×4)
- Tata 2 Stretcher Ambulance
- Tata 407 Troop Carrier
- Tata SA 1212 Troop Carrier
- Tata LPTA 713 TC (4x4)
- Tata LPT 709 E
- Tata SD 1015 TC (4x4)
- Tata LPTA 1615 TC (4x4)
- Tata LPTA 1615 TC (4x2)
- Tata LPTA 1621 TC (6x6)
- Tata LPTA 5252 TC (12x12)
- Tata 207
- TATA Kestrel

=== UAVs ===
TASL is bidding to develop and build unmanned aerial vehicles (UAVs) for the Indian Armed Forces for surveillance. It has agreements with Israel Aerospace Industries (IAI) and "Urban Aeronautics" for cooperation and co-development of UAVs in India. It has developed and successfully flight tested a long-range kamikaze drone known as ALS-50 which can strike beyond ranges of 50 km and turn back in case of an abandoned mission and will soon be in use by the Indian armed forces.

=== Rajak ===
TASL developed Rajak-XLR, an enhanced variant of Rajak-ULR, for the Regiment of Artillery. It consists of a long-range continuous zoom-type thermal camera, a long-range continuous zoom-type day camera, and a laser rangefinder for analysing the distance of the target. The system can detect vehicles within a range of 50 km including the type and humans within 40 km.

=== Lanza-N radar ===
TASL licence-manufactures Lanza-N L-band air surveillance radars for the frontline warships of the Indian Navy. The radar was designed & developed by Indra Sistemas. In 2019, the Indian Navy ordered 23 such radars from the Tata Advanced Systems at a cost of ₹12 billion (US$170.41 million). The delivery was to be completed by 2029. The first 3 units were to be directly delivered by Indra, while the rest of 20 units will be manufactured in India. By March 2023, the first radar was delivered to the Navy, and two units were under production. In July 2024, it was reported that INS Mysore (D60) has been retrofitted with the radar.

The first Made in India Lanza-N radar was built, delivered, and commissioned into an Indian Navy warship on 10 September 2025. The radar was accepted and inducted after rigorous sea trials where the performance was tested against multiple naval and aerial targets with varying radar cross sections. The radar will be integrated with other Indian Navy frigates, destroyers, and aircraft carriers following this. The Indian variant would be modified for optimised to optimise its operation in the very humid and hot conditions of the Indian Ocean. TASL is the first Indian company to produce a 3D Air Surveillance Radar (3D-ASR). TASL operates a radar assembly, integration, and test facility in Karnataka. Lanza-N is an air defence and anti-missile radar.

=== Satellites ===
TASL built TSAT-1A at the Vemagal facility in Karnataka in collaboration with Satellogic. It is the first private-sector-owned sub-metre resolution earth observation satellite in India. the satellite was launched aboard SpaceX's Falcon 9 Bandwagon-1 mission on 7 April 2024 at 23:16 GMT. TASL signed a deal with Satellogic, a US-based LEO satellite manufacturer, to build a production facility in India for LEO satellites.

== Aerospace ventures ==
=== Tata–Sikorsky Aerospace ===
In February 2007, the then United Technologies Corporation's subsidiary, Sikorsky Aircraft Corporation and India's Tata Advanced Systems (TASL) signed a Memorandum of Understanding (MoU) to create opportunities for aerospace operations in India. On June 12, 2009, Sikorsky signed an agreement with TASL for manufacturing helicopter cabins of S-92(R) in India for export and domestic markets. The first cabin would be delivered in late 2010 from a new greenfield manufacturing facility near Hyderabad, the then capital of Andhra Pradesh. On November 12, the companies signed another agreement to form a joint venture (which led to the formation Tata–Sikorsky Aerospace Limited) to manufacture aerospace components in India. The venture would be open to manufacture components for other OEMs in the aerospace sector as well. The joint venture's operations would be based in a second greenfield facility beside the cabin manufacturing building. The construction of the second facility, initially meant for production of over 5,000 "detailed aerospace components", is scheduled for completion by 2011 with production commencing from 2012.

The first consignment of S-92 cabins was delivered in November 2010. The facility is located in the Special Economic Zone (SEZ) in Adibatla. As of April 2012, Sikorsky planned to double the manufacturing capacity of helicopter cabins in the Hyderabad facility. The enhanced capacity would be enhanced in a phased manner with two cabins per month in June 2012 and then to 3 cabins per month or 36 units annually in December 2013. The workforce would be increased to match the planned capacity. As of May 2015, the joint venture was also producing 4,000 components besides the cabins which is expected to achieve an indigenous content of 80% by 2013. There were also plans to establish a helicopter manufacturing facility with a capacity of 2–3 S-92 helicopters monthly after 2015–16 in addition to other manufacturing facilities in China, Holland, Turkey and Columbia and other South American countries. On October 24, 2013, the joint venture delivered the first fully indigenous S-92 cabin which would be then shipped to the US for final assembly and delivery. Meanwhile, the company delivered the 50th cabin earlier that month. Its production capacity had been increased to four cabins per month in the first facility along with 5,000 different components in the second facility.

=== Tata–Lockheed Martin Aerostructures ===
==== C-130J projects ====
In July 2010, the then Foreign Investment Promotion Board under the Government of India cleared the proposal of Tata Group's wholly-owned subsidiary, Tata Advanced Systems (TASL), to form a joint venture with Lockheed Martin’s wholly owned subsidiary, Lockheed Martin Aeroframe Corporation (LMAC). The joint venture (JV) company will be Tata–Lockheed Martin Aerostructures Limited (TLMAL) where TASL and LMAC will initially hold a stake of 74% and 26%, respectively. To develop the infrastructures necessary for the JV's operation, TASL and LMAC will invest ₹42.82 crore (equivalent to ₹105 crore or US$11 million in 2026) and ₹121.27 crore (equivalent to ₹297 crore or US$31 million in 2026). As stated by TASL, the joint venture would have an export potential of ₹920 crore (US$201.2 million). The joint venture was as a part of offset obligation to the Indian Air Force’s deal to purchase 6 C-130J-30 tactical airlifter.

By late 2011, the joint venture started the production of airframe components for Lockheed Martin C-130J Super Hercules aircraft. The components were then shipped to Lockheed's C-130 final assembly line facility in Marietta, Georgia, for integration and delivery.

As of March 2014, Lockheed Martin was looking to establish an engine MRO facility in India to support the country's and South Asia's aviation market. This would be the company's third engine MRO facility besides its existing facilities in the US and Canada. A feasibility study for the purpose was underway within the company, and the firm is expected to confirm its decision by the year-end. As of then, the company had yet to decide on the facility's initial maintenance capacity, rate, its location — Hyderabad, Delhi, Bangalore, and Mumbai — and whether to develop the facility from scratch or undertake a joint development with an existing entity. Meanwhile, the company already has its presence in Adibatla SEZ near Hyderabad, operating as TMLAL, in order to manufacture aerostructures like centre wing boxes and empennages for defence aircraft.

On 16 September 2016, TLMAL delivered the 50th empennage assembly — including horizontal and vertical stabilisers along with leading edges and tip assemblies — and also completed manufacturing of 28 sets of centre wing box components — including front and rear beam assemblies, formers and trailing edge sections — for C-130J on or ahead of schedule. The company also established itself as the sole global supplier of both components for the aircraft.

On 18 April 2018, TMLAL inducted India's first-of-its-kind metal-to-metal-bonding facility, besides the existing infrastructure. The new facility spreads over an area of 4,700 m^{2} (1.2 acres) and employs a skilled workforce with a strength of over 80. Additionally, TLMAL also undertook an initiative to increase the indigenisation of the empennage assemblies by transferring the production responsibilities of 2,000 empennage parts from foreign entities to Tata–Sikorsky Aerospace Limited (TSAL), another Tata-Lockheed Martin joint venture. Overall, the joint venture employs 500 people and has an annual capacity of 24 C-130J empennages. As of then, 85 empennages built by TLMAL have been installed on C-130J aircraft delivered by Lockheed Martin to customers around the world, including the Indian Air Force.

TLMAL delivered the 100th, 150th, 200th and 250th empennage to Lockheed Martin on 20 February 2019, 20 October 2021, 9 August 2023 and 5 December 2025.

On 24 August 2021, Lockheed Martin was awarded a Follow-On Support II (FOS) contract worth $328.8 million from the Indian Air Force for its 12-aircraft C-130J-30 fleet for five years. For the entire duration of the contract, eight personnel from Lockheed Martin, General Electric (propeller manufacturer), and Rolls-Royce (engine manufacturer) will be stationed in India to support on-site technical maintenance of the fleet. Additionally, under the FOS II contract, five C-130J Hercules aircraft will undergo 12-year depot-level servicing at a Lockheed Martin-approved Heavy Maintenance Center (HMC), starting in 2022.

On 10 September 2024, Lockheed Martin and Tata Advanced Systems signed a teaming agreement to strengthen and expand their collaboration on the C-130J Super Hercules programme. The expansion includes the establishment of a Maintenance, Repair and Overhaul (MRO) facility to support the C-130J fleet of the Indian Air Force and other global users as well as, beyond manufacturing and assembling components, producing the entire aircraft in India to support Lockheed Martin's campaign for the Indian Air Force's Medium Transport Aircraft (MTA). The final assembly line would be set up in India only if Lockheed Martin gets the MTA contract and would complement the already-operational final assembly line in Marietta, Georgia, USA. Meanwhile, TLMAL also delivered over 220 empennages for C-130J.

The groundbreaking ceremony for the aforementioned MRO facility was held on 5 December 2025 at Bhatramarenahalli near the Kempegowda International Airport in Bengaluru. As per the schedule, the construction of the facility is expected to commence in 2026 with operationalisation planned in early 2027. The facility support not only C-130J but also KC-130J and C-130 B-H variants.

In March 2026, Ramco Systems announced that TASL has selected its aviation MRO software for the facility. The software will manage all aspects of the facility's operation, including contract and quote management, maintenance planning, hangar and component maintenance, supply chain management, engineering and quality, as well as customer billing. The MRO will be operationalised by December 2026.

==== F-16IN production proposal ====
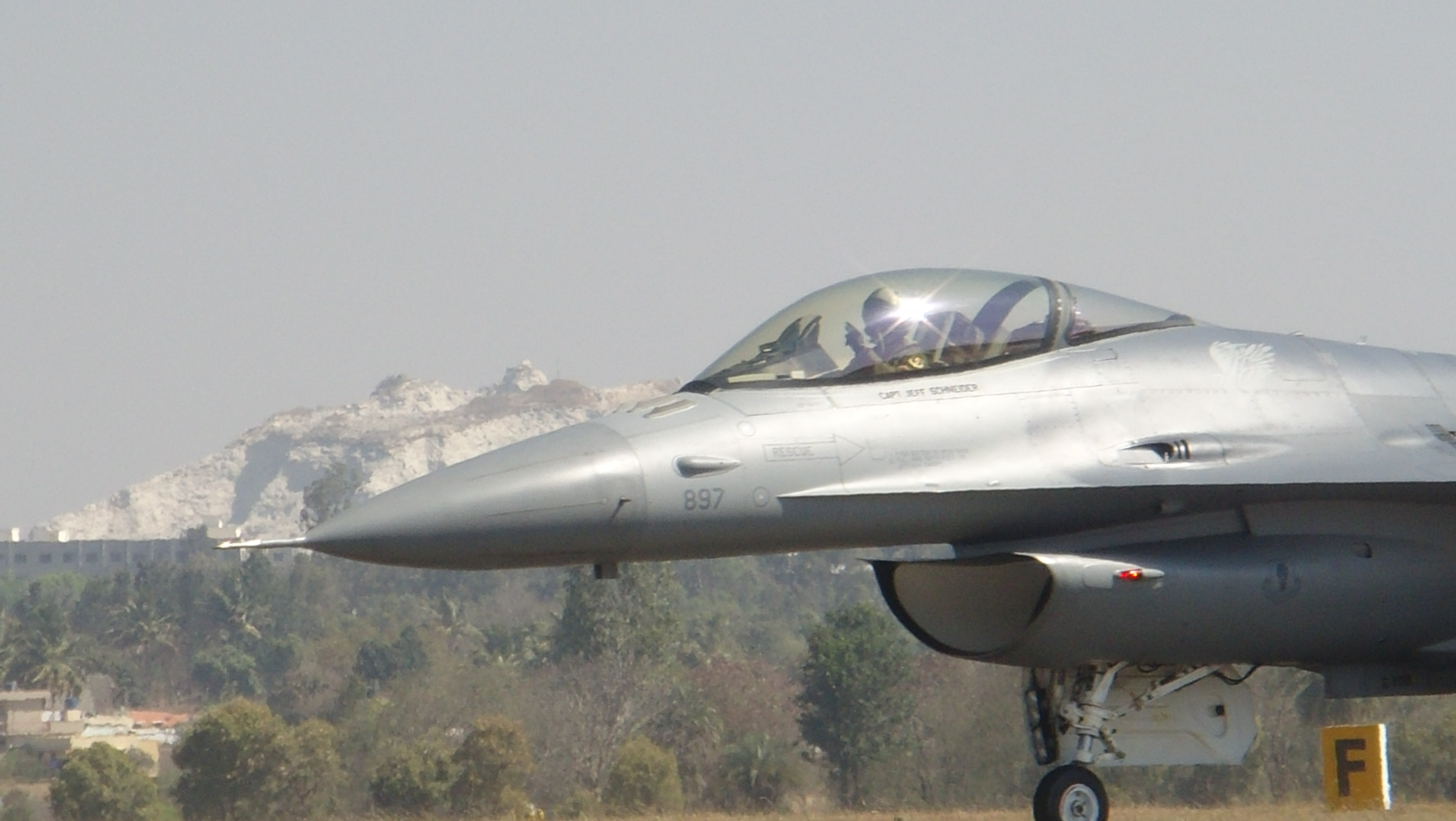
USAF F-16 Block 50 on ground taxiing to the runway for take-off at Aero India 2011, Yelahanka Air force Base Bangalore.

As of 2017, Lockheed Martin has agreed to sign a letter of intent with the Indian defence firm Tata Advanced Systems Limited to manufacture the jets in India if the Indian government accepts their tender for India's request for a purchase of single-engine aircraft to replace its aging MiG-series fighters. The new production line can be utilized to supply jets to India as well as for exporting them overseas. On 19 June 2017, during the Paris Air Show, Tata Advanced Systems Limited and Lockheed Martin signed an agreement to produce F-16 Block 70 aircraft in India under the latter's offer to provide the jet to the Indian Air Force under MMRCA. However, the Indian Air Force declined to buy the aircraft, and production never took place.

==== F-21 production proposal ====
Lockheed Martin unveiled the F-21 concept at the Aero India air show on 20 February 2019. The F-21 would include 114 "Indian Specific Enhancements". Lockheed Martin had offered the F-16IN variant earlier in the MMRCA tender and has replaced the offer with the current F-21 which is to be built in collaboration with Tata Advanced Systems in the available Hyderabad facility. However, the Indian Air Force declined to buy the aircraft, and production never took place.

=== Tata–Boeing Aerospace ===
==== B787 sub components ====
In August 2007, TAL Manufacturing Solutions Limited (TALMSL), then a wholly-owned subsidiary of Tata Motors, planned to acquire a land in a Special Economic Zone (SEZ) in Nagpur. The firm would set up a component manufacturing plant there and would probably aim at the aerospace sector. By February 2008, the company was setting up a manufacturing facility at MIHAN. TALMSL also announced that they will be a part of Boeing 787 Dreamliner's supply chain and will manufacture floor beams for the aircraft in its upcoming facility using state-of-the-art technology of advanced titanium and composite materials. The first deliveries were expected in early 2009. While Boeing awarded the maiden contract for Advanced Composite Floor Beam (ACFB) to TALMSL in 2011, the first batch was delivered in 2014. In September 2012, TALMSL was planning a brownfield expansion worth ₹250 crore (US$46.78 million) over an area of 190 acres (0.77 km^{2}) in addition to its existing facility in MIHAN. This facility was expected to be ready by 2017. On 27 August 2019, Boeing marked the delivery of 25,000th ACFB from TALMSL, now a TASL subsidiary.

==== AH-64 Apache fuselage ====
On 9 November 2015, Boeing and Tata Advanced Systems (TASL) announced a joint venture, named Tata–Boeing Aerospace (TBAL), to co-produce the AH-64's fuselage in India for the global market. On 18 June 2016, TBAL laid the foundation of the facility outside Hyderabad. In March 2018, it was inaugurated by Nirmala Sitharaman, the then Indian Defence Minister. On 1 June 2018, TBAL delivered the first Made-in-India fuselage ahead of schedule to Boeing's facility in Mesa, Arizona for final assembly. On 23 July 2021, TBAL delivered the 100th Indian-made fuselage. By then, the facility also started delivering secondary structure and vertical spar boxes for the AH-64. On 19 January 2023, TBAL delivered the first fuselage for the Indian Army's order.

By 2018, this facility covered an area of 14,000 m^{2} (3.5 acres) and was staffed by 350 workers at full production. The workforce grew to 900 by 2023. Of the fuselages delivered, 90% of the components were manufactured in India through more than 100 MSME suppliers by 2025. The 300th Apache fuselage was rolled out from the facility on 10 February 2025, while the 400th was rolled out on 7 September 2026.

==== B737 family subcomponents ====
In 2021, India's Tata Advanced Systems (TASL) joined the 737's supply chain by opening a new production line parallel to the existing production line to produce the fuselage of Boeing AH-64 Apache. On 6 August 2021, TASL announced that they were awarded the contract to supply 737's fan cowls to Boeing and were slated to cater up to 50% of the 737 fan cowl requirement to the latter from FY2025. On 14 February 2023, Tata Boeing Aerospace Limited (TBAL) shipped the first vertical fin structure for the Boeing 737 aircraft. The structures would be delivered to Boeing Renton Factory.

=== Dassault Rafale fuselage ===
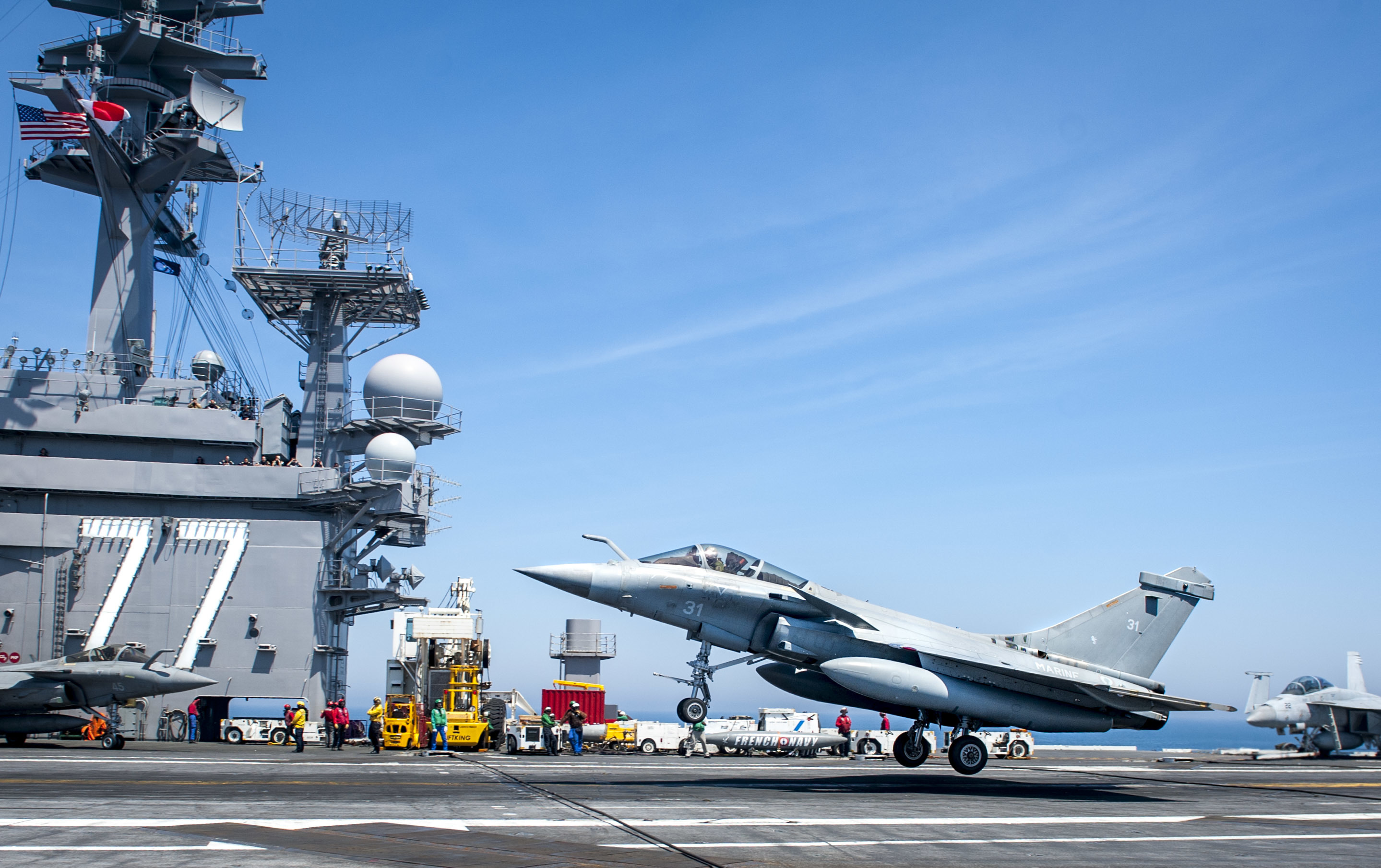
A French Navy Rafale M landing aboard USS George H.W. Bush - 11 May 2018

On 5 June 2025, Dassault Aviation announced its partnership with India's Tata Advanced Systems (TASL) for the production of Rafale's fuselage in India after signing four Production Transfer Agreements. The manufacturing will be taken up in TASL's Hyderabad facility. The first fuselage will roll out from fiscal year of 2028 with a production rate of two units per month. This will be the first time the Rafale's fuselage is manufactured outside of France. Since earlier, five different parts of Rafale is being manufactured by Dassault Reliance Aerospace Limited (DRAL) in Nagpur, India.
