= TSAT-1A =

Commercial Earth observation satellite owned by TSAL

- Operator: TASL
- Mission duration: 5 years (planned)

Spacecraft properties
- Manufacturer: TASL, Satellogic
- Launch mass: 50kg

Start of mission
- Launch date: 7 April 2024 23:16 GMT
- Rocket: Falcon 9
- Launch site: LC-39A Kennedy Space Center
- Contractor: SpaceX

TSAT-1A is an sub-metre resolution earth observation satellite built by TATA Advanced Systems Limited in collaboration with Satellogic. It was launched on the SpaceX Falcon 9 Bandwagon-1 mission on April 7, 2024 from the Kennedy Space Center in Florida. It is India's first military-grade geospatial satellite built entirely by the private sector.

In November 2023, TASL and Satellogic formed a partnership to develop and integrate an advanced earth observation satellite. TSAT-1A is a sub-meter resolution Earth observation satellite that orbits in low-earth orbit. It will provide military-grade imagery with a resolution of less than one meter per pixel.The satellite is equipped with a multispectral camera and edge processing capabilities. The satellite was built under Technology Transfer with Satellogic providing initial components, with which TASL built the satellite at its Vemagal facility in Karnataka.

TSAT-1A caters primarily to the government and armed forces, offering high-resolution military-grade imagery. The company also targets commercial customers. TASL intends to produce up to 25 low earth orbit satellites annually.

== Partnership ==
The contract between Tata Advanced Systems Limited (TASL) and Satellogic, signed in November 2023, covered training, knowledge transfer and local assembly of optical sub-meter-resolution Earth observation satellites in India, and TSAT-1A was planned as the first of them. The deal was Satellogic's second customer in its Space Systems program, after an agreement with an international space agency, and it marked the company's entry into the Indian defense and commercial market. Under the arrangement, Satellogic provided industry knowledge transfer, foundational components, intellectual-property licensing and support in constructing an assembly, integration and testing (AIT) facility in India. After launch, TASL's chief executive, Sukaran Singh, called the satellite "a first step" and thanked various Indian government authorities for the permissions required for the mission.

== Payload ==
TSAT-1A is based on Satellogic's NewSat Mark V design. It carries a four-band multispectral camera with 70 cm resolution and monochromatic full-motion video capability, along with a 29-band hyperspectral camera with 18 m resolution. According to Janes, the satellite can be used to gather intelligence for the Indian Armed Forces and to enhance surveillance of strategic areas of interest. TASL said it would deliver high-resolution optical images with increased collection capacity, dynamic range and low-latency delivery through its multispectral and hyperspectral capabilities. Satellogic states that the NewSat Mark V has a lifespan of three to four years.

== See also ==
- Space Industry of India
- Defence Space Agency
