= Chaiseri AWAV =

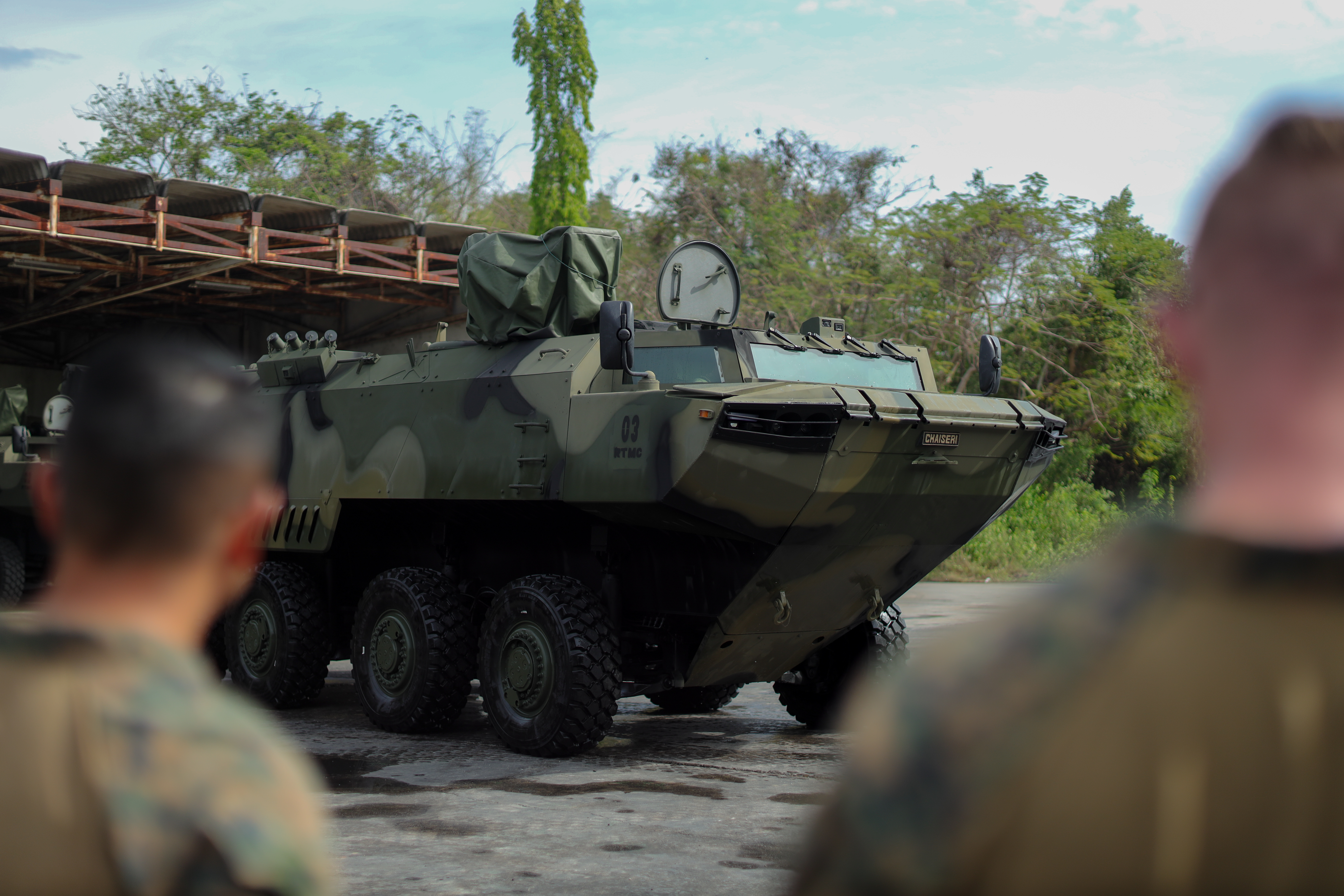
- AWAV on maintenance at Royal Thai Marine Corps Base Camp Jessada, Sattahip
- Type: Amphibious Armoured personnel carrier
- Place of origin: Thailand

Service history
- In service: 2024–present

Production history
- Manufacturer: Chaiseri Metal and Rubber
- Produced: 2023–present

Specifications
- Mass: 23.2 tonnes (curb); 25.7 tonnes (gross)
- Length: 9.2 m
- Width: 3.1 m
- Height: 3.0 m
- Crew: 3 (commander, driver, gunner) + 11 troops
- Armor: STANAG 4569 Level 2 (ballistic), Level 3b (mine)
- Engine: Caterpillar C13 (inline-6 diesel); 711 hp
- Transmission: Allison X300 automatic (4 forward, 2 reverse)
- Suspension: Independent, double wishbone, hydropneumatic suspension with ride height control
- Operational range: 800 km (road)
- Maximum speed: 110 km/h (68 mph) (road); 13 km/h (8.1 mph) (water)

The Chaiseri AWAV (Armoured Wheeled Amphibious Vehicle) is an 8x8 amphibious armoured personnel carrier (APC) designed and manufactured by the Thai defense company Chaiseri Metal and Rubber. It is engineered primarily for littoral operations, ship-to-shore transit, and coastal defense missions.

== Development ==
The AWAV was developed by Chaiseri to provide an agile, cost-effective alternative to larger, maintenance-intensive tracked amphibious assault vehicles. Unveiled at the Defense & Security 2023 exhibition in Bangkok, the vehicle was the result of a development programme undertaken in collaboration with the Royal Thai Marine Corps (RTMC). The design leverages Chaiseri's previous expertise with the First Win family of vehicles, incorporating a rearward-shifted engine, dual waterjet propulsion units, and a front-mounted wave shield to facilitate water navigation.

== Design ==
The AWAV is an 8x8 wheeled platform designed to transition rapidly between deep-water amphibious operations and overland deployment.

- Mobility: The vehicle is powered by a Caterpillar C13 diesel engine. The C13 is an inline-6, four-stroke cycle engine that provides 711 horsepower in this configuration. It is paired with an Allison X300 automatic transmission, featuring 4 forward and 2 reverse gears, allowing for road speeds of approximately 105–110 km/h and water speeds of 10–13 km/h. It features an independent, double-wishbone, hydro-pneumatic suspension system with dynamic ride-height control.
- Amphibious capability: The vehicle is equipped with two waterjet propulsion units at the rear and an integrated wave shield to maintain stability and speed during ship-to-shore transitions.
- Protection: The hull is constructed to meet STANAG 4569 Level 2 ballistic protection standards and Level 3b mine protection.
- Armament: The platform is modular and typically configured with remote weapon stations (RWS), such as the Guardian 1.5, which can be armed with a 12.7 mm machine gun, complemented by 76 mm smoke grenade launchers for multispectral screening.

== Operators ==
- Thailand: The Royal Thai Marine Corps (RTMC) is the primary operator. The RTMC awarded an initial THB448 million contract in 2023 for seven vehicles (delivered in September 2024), and a follow-on THB504 million contract in 2026 for an additional seven units. A third order for seven more vehicles valued at THB504 million was proposed, bringing the total to 21 vehicles.
- Philippines: In July 2026, the Philippine Navy awarded a contract to Chaiseri to supply five AWAVs for the Philippine Marine Corps' Peacekeeping Operations Group. This procurement marks the platform's first international export sale, with deliveries scheduled to conclude by 2027.

== Specifications ==
- Weight: 23.2 tonnes (curb); 25.7 tonnes (gross)
- Length: 9.2 m
- Width: 3.1 m
- Height: 3.0 m
- Crew: 3 (commander, driver, gunner) + 11 troops
- Operational Range: 800 km (road)

== See also ==
- First Win
- Chaiseri Metal and Rubber
- Amphibious warfare
