= Satellogic =

American space technology company

Satellogic Inc.
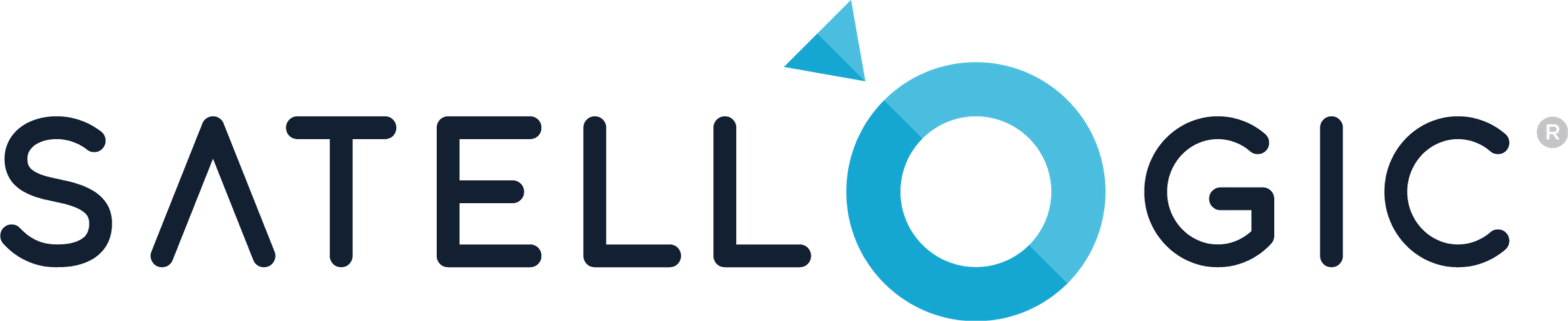
- Type: Public
- Traded as: Nasdaq: SATL
- Industry: Spacecraft design; Data Science; Earth observation satellite; Image processing
- Founded: 2010
- Founders: Emiliano Kargieman; Gerardo Richarte
- Headquarters: Delaware, USA (corporate HQ)
- Number of locations: List: Montevideo, Uruguay; Buenos Aires, Argentina; Cordoba, Argentina; Barcelona, Spain; Davidson, North Carolina, United States
- Number of employees: 140 (2024)
- Website: satellogic.com

Satellogic Inc. is an Argentine-U.S. company specializing in Earth-observation satellites, founded in 2010 by Emiliano Kargieman and Gerardo Richarte.

Satellogic began launching their Aleph-1 constellation of ÑuSat satellites in May 2016 and has, as of September 2025, launched more 50 ÑuSat satellites. Satellogic redomiciled to Delaware in 2025 to officially become a US company.

In January 2022 the company went public with a special-purpose acquisition company (CF Acquisition Corp. V) merger. Satellogic is a publicly traded company on the Nasdaq exchange.

== History ==
In the summer of 2010, after spending some time at the Ames Research Center in Mountain View, California, Emiliano Kargieman started developing the concepts that would become Satellogic. He realized there was a great opportunity: to bring to the satellite services industry many of the lessons learned during the last two decades of working with Information Technology, and build a platform that provides spatial information services, without major investments in infrastructure. Together with his friend and colleague, Gerardo Richarte, they started Satellogic.

Since 2010, the company has grown from a small start-up to a multinational company that has customers around the globe.

Satellogic made Argentina's first two nanosatelites, CubeBug-1 (nickname El Capitán Beto, COSPAR 2013-018D, launched 26 April 2013 on a Long March 2D launch vehicle) and CubeBug-2 (nickname Manolito, also known as LUSAT-OSCAR 74 or LO 74, COSPAR 2013-066AA, launched 21 November 2013 on a Dnepr launch vehicle). Their third satellite, BugSat 1, launched in June 2014. Both the CubeBug-1 and CubeBug-2 as well as the BugSat 1 satellite served as technology tests and demonstrations for the ÑuSat satellites. They also had amateur radio payloads.

The CubeBug project was sponsored by Argentinian Ministry of Science, Technology and Productive Innovation. Satellogic began launching their Aleph-1 constellation of ÑuSat satellites in May 2016.

On 19 December 2019, Satellogic announced they have received US$50 million in funding in the latest funding round. In January 2022 the company went public with a special-purpose acquisition company (CF Acquisition Corp. V) merger. In connection with the closing of the business combination and other transactions, Satellogic received gross proceeds of approximately $262 million to fund its satellite constellation. Satellogic planned to have 202 satellites in orbit by 2025 and expected revenue of $480 million in 2025. Former US Secretary of the Treasury Steven Mnuchin and Cantor Fitzgerald CEO Howard Lutnick invested in the SPAC merging with Satellogic and became major investors.

Satellogic announced a partnership with Palantir Technologies in 2022.

As of June 2024, Satellogic had 26 satellites in operation in space and staff of about 140 people. Its revenues for all of 2022 were $6-8 million, and for 2023 $10 million.

After President-elect Donald Trump announced in November 2024 that he would make Howard Lutnick the new US Secretary of Commerce, Lutnick resigned from the Satellogic board of directors. At the same time, his company Cantor Fitzgerald increased its stake in Satellogic.

== Technology ==
Satellogic is building a 200+ satellite constellation as a scalable Earth observation platform with the ability to remap the entire planet on a weekly basis at high resolution to provide geospatial insights.

Satellogic created a small, light, and inexpensive system that can be produced at scale. Each commercial satellite carries two payloads – one for high resolution multispectral imaging and another one for a hyperspectral camera of 30 m GSD and 150 km swath (at a 470 km altitude).

=== Satellite specifications ===
Satellogic's satellites are built to the following specifications:

Size:	51 x 57 x 82 cm
Dry Mass:	40 kg
Wet Mass:	50 kg
Development Cycle:	3 months
Design Life:	3-5 years

== Products and services ==
Satellogic is a Public Earth observation company listed on the NASDAQ (SATL) focused on building an information platform to solve the Earth's greatest challenges. Its business is structured around three main product lines:

Asset Monitoring: Uses high-resolution, sub‐meter imagery to support applications in defense and security, infrastructure management, agriculture, and environmental monitoring. Satellogic recently signed a contract with the NASA CSDA to provide access to Satellogic's NewSat imagery fleet and with the Brazilian Air Force. to provide access to it low latency tasking and delivery capabilities to manage their national security.

Constellation-as-a-Service: Offers a subscription-based model providing regular satellite imagery updates from a dedicated fleet, enabling assured access to imagery for mission critical applications. This business model enables nations to more rapidly develop their space capabilities and technology sectors through a comprehensive training and technology transfer/partnership model. As an example Albania purchased such a program in September 2022. Uzma of Malaysia and TATA Advanced Systems of India have also entered into similar agreements in December 2023 and November 2023, respectively.

Satellite Systems: Develops and sells satellite hardware equipped with sensors—including multispectral and hyperspectral cameras, full-motion video, inter-satellite radios for near real-time control and access, and onboard computing. Satellogic has delivered space technology to the Taiwan Space Agency under a contract signed in 2023. Further, Satellogic signed an agreement with IDT to support their US Office of Naval Research's (ONR) Slingshot Experimentation Series. One of Satellogic's strength in this field is space heritage, and a "spirit of innovation".

Imagery Access: Platform User Interface: Its platform, Aleph, enables users to place tasking orders and access the archive on-demand.

Platform Application Programing Interface: The company further provides access to its tasking feasibility analysis tools, low latency tasking and archive via a robust API, detailed in their developer site.

Imagery Products Satellogic provides sub-meter imagery with resolution up to 50cm Super Resolution based on 70cm native. All bands are captured at the same high resolution. Images are captured in four multi-spectral bands (R,G,B,NIR) with a swath width of 6.5m at nadir and can support single strip captures, multistrip captures and full motion video. Satellogic's developer's site provides more information on the product specifications. Satellogic's NewSat sensor can capture imagery in support of Non-Earth Imaging (NEI) as evidenced through its partnership with HEO Robotics.

Imagery Pricing Satellogic is one of the few satellite imagery providers who publishes their list pricing online.

Strategic Partnerships In December 2024, Satellogic signed a strategic partnership with Maxar Intelligence to bring Satellogic's data to the US government defense and intelligence market and other international allied nations.

=== Data services ===
Satellogic offers 1-meter resolution multispectral imaging and 30-meter resolution hyperspectral satellite imagery.

=== Geospatial analytics ===
Satellogic's data science and AI team convert images into layers available as data-services in its online platform, including object identification, classification, semantic change detection and predictive models within a broad range of industries including agriculture, forestry, energy, finance and insurance, as well as applications for the civilian area of governments, such as cartography, environmental monitoring and critical infrastructure, among others.

== Offices ==
Satellogic's R&D facilities are located in Buenos Aires and Córdoba, Argentina. The AIT facility is located in Montevideo, Uruguay. The data-technology center in Barcelona, Spain; a finance office in Charlotte, United States, and there is a business development center in Miami, United States.

== Satellite launches ==
As of February 2025, Satellogic has launched 53 satellites primarily from the US (with SpaceX). All current satellites in the operational fleet are from SpaceX launches.

Satellogic has launched 50 NewSat spacecraft, a 50 kg small satellite design optimized for high-capacity imaging. NewSat delivers 50 cm super-resolution imagery with a 6.5 km swath, capturing all spectral bands at their native resolution—eliminating the need for pan-sharpening. This preserves spectral integrity, avoiding the quality trade-offs common in sensors that rely on pan-sharpening to achieve similar resolution.

Since 2018, Satellogic has a tradition of naming their spacecraft after important women scientists. Satellogic maintains a listing of the women in STEM it has celebrated through satellite names.

On 19 January 2021, it was announced that SpaceX would become their preferred rideshare vendor, the first due in June 2021. In May 2022, a new multi-launch agreement with SpaceX for the next ~60 satellites was announced.

Satellite	Launch Vehicle	Launch Base Location	Launch Date
CubeBug-1, Capitán Beto	Long March 2D	Jiuquan, China	26 April 2013
CubeBug-2, Manolito	Dnepr	Yasny, Russia	21 November 2013
BugSat-1, Tita	Dnepr	Yasny, Russia	19 June 2014
ÑuSat-1, Fresco ÑuSat-2, Batata	Long March 4B	Taiyuan, China	30 May 2016
ÑuSat-3, Milanesat	Long March 4B	Jiuquan, China	15 June 2017
ÑuSat-4, Ada Lovelace ÑuSat-5, Maryam Mirzakhani	Long March 2D	Jiuquan, China	2 February 2018
ÑuSat-7, Sophie Germain ÑuSat-8, Marie Curie	Long March 2D	Taiyuan, China	15 January 2020
ÑuSat-6, Hypatia	Vega	Kourou, French Guiana	2 September 2020
ÑuSat-9, Alice Ball ÑuSat-10, Caroline Herschel ÑuSat-11, Cora Ratto ÑuSat-12, Dorothy Vaughan ÑuSat-13, Emmy Noether ÑuSat-14, Hedy Lamarr ÑuSat-15, Katherine Johnson ÑuSat-16, Lise Meitner Ñusat-17, Mary Jackson ÑuSat-18, Vera Rubin	Long March 6	Taiyuan, China	6 November 2020
ÑuSat-19, Rosalind Franklin ÑuSat-20, Grace Hopper ÑuSat-21, Elisa Bachofen ÑuSat-22, Sofya Kovalevskaya	Falcon 9 Block 5	Cape Canaveral, United States	30 June 2021
ÑuSat-23, Annie Maunder ÑuSat-24, Kalpana Chawla ÑuSat-25, Maria Telkes ÑuSat-26, Mary Somerville ÑuSat-27, Sally Ride	Falcon 9 Block 5	Cape Canaveral, United States	1 April 2022
ÑuSat-28, Alice Lee ÑuSat-29, Edith Clarke ÑuSat-30, Margherita Hack ÑuSat-31, Ruby Payne-Scott	Falcon 9 Block 5	Cape Canaveral, United States	25 May 2022
ÑuSat-32, Albania-1 ÑuSat-33, Albania-2 ÑuSat-34, Amelia Earhart ÑuSat-35, Williamina Fleming	Falcon 9 Block 5	Cape Canaveral, United States	3 January 2023
ÑuSat-36, Annie Jump Cannon ÑuSat-37, Joan Clarke ÑuSat-38, Maria Gaetana Agnesi ÑuSat-39, Tikvah Alper	Falcon 9 Block 5	Vandenberg, United States	15 April 2023
ÑuSat-40, Carolyn Shoemaker ÑuSat-41, Cecilia Payne-Gaposchkin ÑuSat-42, Maria Wonenburger ÑuSat-43, Rose Dieng-Kuntz	Falcon 9 Block 5	Vandenberg, United States	12 June 2023
ÑuSat-44, Maria Mitchell	Falcon 9 Block 5	Vandenberg, United States	4 March 2024
ÑuSat-46, TSAT-1A (in collaboration with TASL)	Falcon 9 Block 5	Cape Canaveral, United States	7 April 2024
ÑuSat-48, Henrietta Leavitt ÑuSat-49, Klára Dán von Neumann ÑuSat-50, Nancy Roman	Falcon 9 Block 5	Vandenberg, United States	16 August 2024

== See also ==
- ÑuSat
