= Robert Moody =

Canadian mathematician

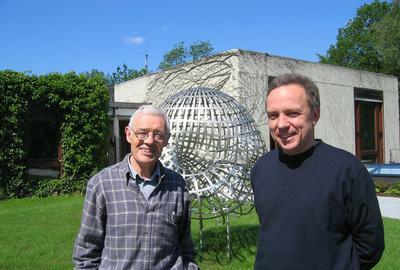
- Robert Moody (left)
- Born: November 28, 1941 (age 84)
- Education: University of Toronto; University of Saskatchewan
- Awards: Coxeter–James Prize (1978); Jeffery–Williams Prize (1995); Wigner Medal (1996); CRM-Fields-PIMS prize (1998)
- Scientific career
- Fields: Mathematics
- Workplaces: University of Saskatchewan; University of Alberta
- Doctoral advisor: Maria Wonenburger

Robert Vaughan Moody, OC FRSC (/ˈmuːdi/; born November 28, 1941) is a Canadian mathematician. He is the co-discoverer of Kac–Moody algebra, a Lie algebra, usually infinite-dimensional, that can be defined through a generalized root system.

"Almost simultaneously in 1967, Victor Kac in the USSR and Robert Moody in Canada developed what was to become Kac–Moody algebra. Kac and Moody noticed that if Wilhelm Killing's conditions were relaxed, it was still possible to associate to the Cartan matrix a Lie algebra which, necessarily, would be infinite dimensional." - A. J. Coleman

Born in Great Britain, he received a Bachelor of Arts in Mathematics in 1962 from the University of Saskatchewan, a Master of Arts in Mathematics in 1964 from the University of Toronto, and a Ph.D. in Mathematics in 1966 from the University of Toronto.

In 1966, he joined the Department of Mathematics as an assistant professor in the University of Saskatchewan. In 1970, he was appointed an associate professor and a professor in 1976. In 1989, he joined the University of Alberta as a professor in the Department of Mathematics.

In 1999, he was made an Officer of the Order of Canada. In 1980, he was made a fellow of the Royal Society of Canada. In 1996 Moody and Kac were co-winners of the Wigner Medal.

== Selected works ==
- Moody, R. V. (1967). "Lie algebras associated with generalized Cartan matrices" (PDF). Bull. Amer. Math. Soc. 73 (2): 217–222. doi:10.1090/s0002-9904-1967-11688-4. MR 0207783.
- Moody, R. V. (1975). "Macdonald identities and Euclidean Lie algebras". Proc. Amer. Math. Soc. 48 (1): 43–52. doi:10.1090/s0002-9939-1975-0442048-2. MR 0442048.
- with S. Berman: Berman, S.; Moody, R. V. (1979). "Lie algebra multiplicities". Proc. Amer. Math. Soc. 76 (2): 223–228. doi:10.1090/s0002-9939-1979-0537078-x. MR 0537078.
- with J. Patera: Moody, R. V.; Patera, J. (1982). "Fast recursion formula for weight multiplicities" (PDF). Bull. Amer. Math. Soc. (N.S.). 7 (1): 237–242. doi:10.1090/s0273-0979-1982-15021-2. MR 0656202.
- with Bremner & Patera: Tables of weight space multiplicities, Marcel Dekker 1983
- with A. Pianzola: Moody, R. V.; Pianzola, A. (1989). "On infinite root systems". Trans. Amer. Math. Soc. 315 (2): 661–696. doi:10.1090/s0002-9947-1989-0964901-8. MR 0964901.
- with S. Kass, J. Patera, & R. Slansky: Affine Lie Algebras, weight multiplicities and branching rules, 2 vols., University of California Press 1991 vol. 1 books.google
- with Pianzola: Lie algebras with triangular decompositions, Canadian Mathematical Society Series, John Wiley 1995
- with Baake & Grimm: Die verborgene Ordnung der Quasikristalle, Spektrum, Feb. 2002; What is Aperiodic Order?, Eng. trans. on arxiv.org
