= First Win =

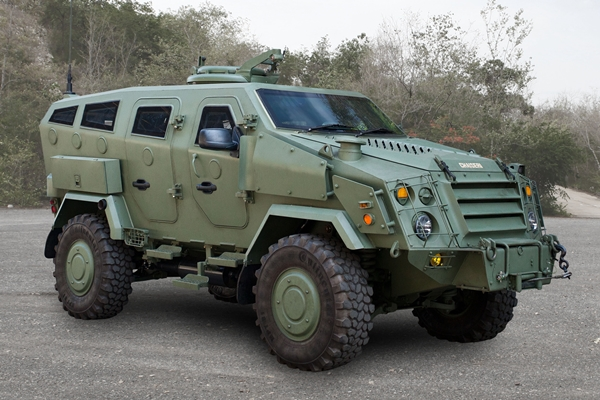
- First Win E (visualization)
- Type: Mine-Resistant Ambush Protected Vehicle
- Place of origin: Thailand

Service history
- Used by: See Operators
- Wars: 2025 Cambodia-Thailand conflict

Production history
- Designed: 2010
- Manufacturer: Chaiseri Metal and Rubber Co., Ltd. (Thailand); DefTech (Malaysia)
- Produced: 2010 – present

Specifications
- Mass: 11 tonnes (empty), 13 tonnes (full) (First Win); 12 tonnes (empty), 14 tonnes (full) (First Win II and First Win IFV); 12 tonnes (empty), 13.5 tonnes (full) (First Win AFV); 11.5 tonnes (empty), 13 tonnes (full) (First Win AIFV); 9 tonnes (empty), 10.5 tonnes (full) (First Win ALV)
- Length: 6.5 meters (First Win); 6.2 meters (First Win II and First Win IFV); 6.09 meters (First Win AFV and First Win AIFV); 5.56 meters (First Win ALV)
- Width: 2.45 meters (First Win, First Win II and First Win IFV); 2.59 meters (First Win AFV and First Win AIFV); 2.3 meters (First Win ALV)
- Height: 2.65 meters (First Win); 2.68 meters (First Win II); 2.56 meters (First Win AFV and First Win AIFV); 2.52 meters (First Win ALV); 2.75 meters (First Win IFV)
- Crew: 1+ 10 (First Win); 1 + 9 (First Win II and First Win IFV); 1 + 7 (First Win AFV and First Win ALV); 1+5 (First Win AIFV)
- Armor: Ballistic: STANAG lv. 2 (optional to lv. 3), mine protection: STANAG lv. 3 (First Win); Ballistic: STANAG lv. 2 (optional to lv. 3), mine protection: STANAG lv. 3b/4a (First Win II); Ballistic: STANAG lv. 1, mine protection: STANAG lv. 2 (First Win AFV); Ballistic: STANAG lv. 1 (optional to lv. 2), mine protection: STANAG lv. 2 (optional to lv. 3) (First Win AIFV); Ballistic: STANAG lv. 1 (optional to lv. 2), mine protection: STANAG lv. 1 (First Win ALV)
- Main armament: Varies: 7.62 mm MG, 0.5 cal HMG, 40 mm AGL
- Engine: Cummins Diesel Engine; 197-215 HP (First Win); 300 HP (First Win II); 330 HP (First Win AFV and First Win AIFV); 215 HP (First Win ALV)
- Transmission: Allison automatic transmission
- Suspension: 4x4
- Ground clearance: 0.4 meters (First Win); 0.36 meters (Axle) 0.49 meters (Hull) (First Win II); 0.48 meters (First Win AFV); 0.5 meters (First Win AIFV); 0.42 meters (First Win ALV)
- Maximum speed: 100 km/h (First Win); 110 km/h (First Win II, First Win AFV, First Win AIFV, First Win ALV and First Win IFV)

The First Win is a Thai Mine-Resistant Ambush Protected Vehicle with an all-welded steel monocoque V-hull produced by Thai defense contractor Chaiseri. The First Win is designed to provide high level protection against a variety of battlefield threats, including mines and improvised explosive devices. Gross vehicle weight is about 9 tonnes (20,000 lb) and it can carry up to 10 troops plus the driver.

Chaiseri hopes to export the First Win to foreign customers.

== History ==
The Royal Thai Army announced a first batch order of 21 First Wins in 2014. Five additional First Wins are being negotiated for acquisition. The Thai Ministry of Justice has ordered 18 First Wins for the Department of Special Investigation. The Royal Thai Police announced in 2016 that a requirement for a First Win acquisition with the Cummins 250 hp diesel engine instead of the 300 hp engine.

In 2017, Chaiseri has shown the First Win 2 in Defense and Security 2017.

In 2021, Chaiseri sold the First Win to Bhutan for use in peacekeeping operations.

On May 19, 2022, Chaiseri is offering the First Win to fulfill Philippine requirements for MRAP-type vehicles.

== Design ==
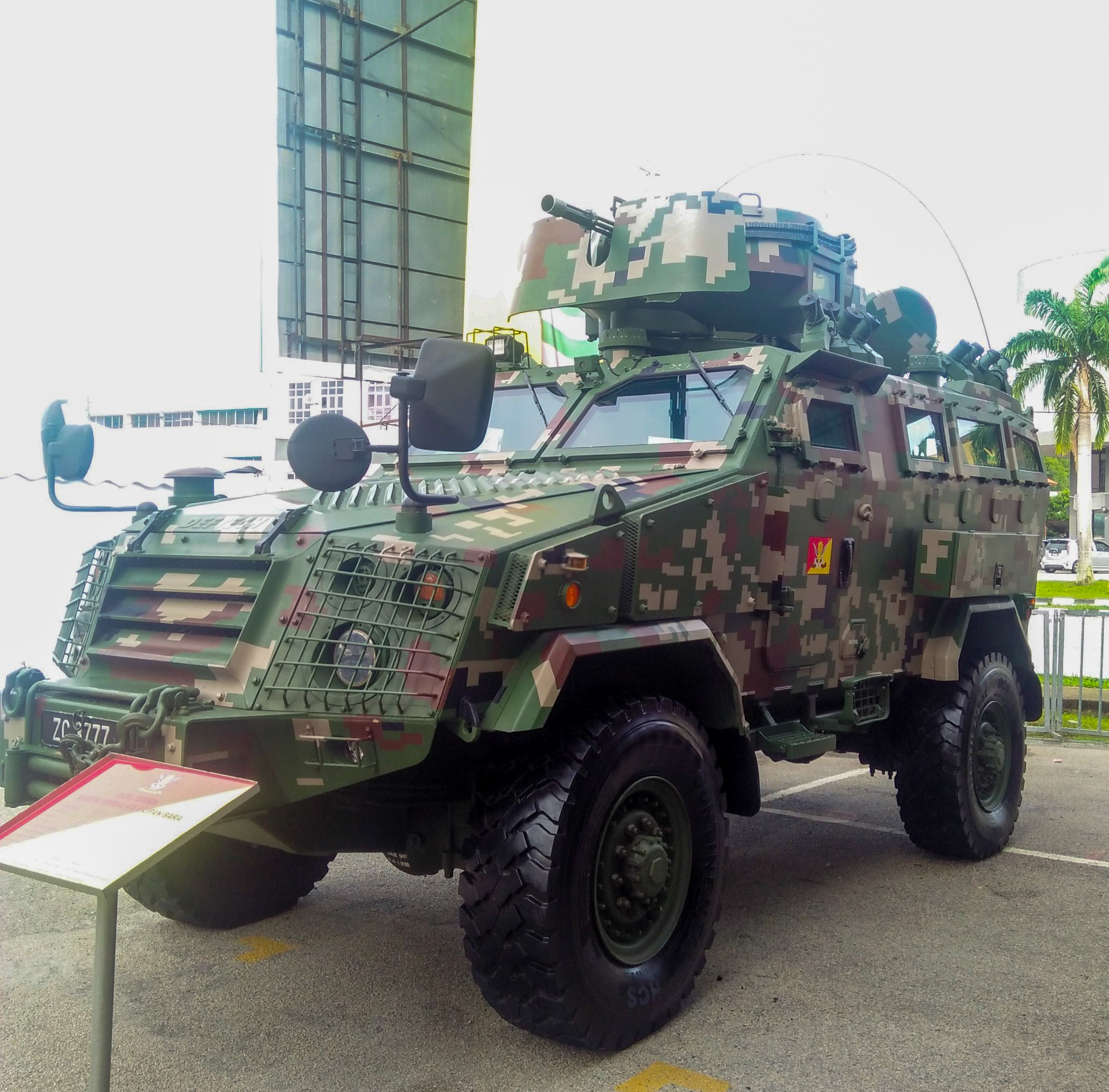
AV4 Lipanbara equipped with M134D-H Mini-gun of Malaysian Army in display.

A 7.62mm or .50 machine gun can be mounted on the roof, while firing ports allow use of small arms from inside. Remote Weapon System can also be installed upon requirement.

The First Win is powered by a Cummins diesel engine (300HP in the original configuration, 250HP in the E version) coupled with an Allison 3000 SP automatic transmission (Allison 2500 SP in the E version., providing maximum road speed of up to 100 km/h. The vehicle comes standard with powered steering, independent suspensions and run-flat tires. Ballistic protection is up to STANAG 4569 Level 2 and mine protection to Level 3B under the hull center and Level 4A under any station.

=== Variants ===
The following are manufactured by Chaiseri:

- First Win: The original model. Known as First Win Armored Multi-Purpose Vehicle.
- First Win II: Model developed from First Win ICV. To offer in the Royal Thai Navy 4x4 Armored Multi-Purpose Vehicle procurement project. And it's the same model that was exported to the Malaysian Army.
- First Win AAV (Armored Ambulance Vehicle): First shown at Bangkok International Motor Show 2021 same as First Win AFV. Developed from First Win II.
- First Win ACV (Armored Command Vehicle)
- First Win AFV (Armored Fighting Vehicle): First shown at Bangkok International Motor Show 2021. It is a wheeled armored vehicle used for tactical 4 x 4 combat or other missions. It is strong enough to withstand local conditions. With an attack and put a bomb Able to operate in the area quickly and safely. Can be modified to Armored personnel carrier (APC), Infantry Fighting Vehicle (IFV), Reconnaissance Vehicle (RV) and Armored Ambulance.
- First Win AIFV (Armored Infantry Fighting Vehicle): Model that won the Royal Thai Air Force light armored vehicle procurement project. Developed from First Win AFV.
- First Win ALV (Armored Light Vehicle): Can carry personnel with maneuverability in limited terrain. It is robust enough to withstand the operating conditions in an area of operation where there are armed attacks and improvised explosive devices. Can be equipped with a variety of weapons, including anti-tank guided weapons.
- First Win Anti-Riot: Used by the Royal Thai Police with a remote control weapon system turret on top. Has a capacity of eight occupants.
- First Win APCV (Armored Personnel Carrier Vehicle): First shown at Defense & Security 2015, with a lengthened body to accommodate more occupants.
- First Win ATV (Armored Tactical Vehicle): It is an Armored Vehicle used in reconnaissance missions, Operating in risk areas. The engine was moved to the rear of the car. For a curved frontal armor design to reflect projectiles fired from the front. reduce the direct impact.
- First Win ATV II: Slightly different on the front of the car from the First Win ATV.
- First Win-E: A more compact variant with gross vehicle weight of 10 tons, comparable to the HMMWV.
- First Win IFV (Infantry Fighting Vehicle): Equipped with automatic armed turrets can fire from inside the car. Developed from First Win II.
- First Win RV (Reconnaissance Vehicle): Introduced in 2019 at the 2019 Navy Training, it equipped M134 on top of a vehicle. And proposed to the Royal Thai Army to consider as a reconnaissance vehicle for infantry. Developed from First Win II.
- First Win MPV (Multipurpose Vehicle): Unveiled at Defense & Security 2022 show in Bangkok.
- AV4 Lipanbara: License built by DefTech for Malaysian Armed Forces and Royal Malaysian Police. 200 vehicle planned. It was renamed as Lipanbara by Malaysian Prime Minister Najib Razak when he visited the Deftech pavilion during Defence Services Asia 2016. The vehicle is named after a poisonous centipede found in Malaysia. AV4 Lipanbara was customized to fulfill the requirement of Malaysian Army standard. This included the installation of 300 hp engine, upgrade and strengthened armored protection up to STANAG 4569 level 3 and the fitted of M134D-H Mini-gun.
- Hanuman: Version made by Indonesia.
- Hisar: Version made in Pakistan by HIT.

== Operators ==
First Win operators in blue.

- Thailand:
  - Royal Thai Army - 21 First Wins ordered in March 2012. About 50 ordered in 2013. RTA's source has indicate interest in the smaller First Win-E. Other 200 confirmed ordered, at least 18 per year will be delivered.
  - Royal Thai Navy - 6 First Win II, with the first 2 being delivered in 2020 and the other 4 in 2021, Used by the Royal Thai Marine Corps.
  - Royal Thai Air Force - 2 First Win AIFV, Test to evaluate the use by Special Operations Regiment (Thailand)
  - Department of Special Investigation - 18 First Wins ordered in October 2015.
  - Department of Corrections - 3 First Win adapted version for transporting prisoners.
  - Office of the Narcotics Control Board - 3 First Win adapted version for the anti-narcotics mission.
  - Internal Security Operations Command - 10 purchased.
- Malaysia:
  - Malaysian Army - 20 in service from 200 planned. First six units will be built by Chaiseri at its facilities in Pathum Thani Province and delivered to Malaysia in the first quarter of 2016. The remaining vehicles will be produced under license by Malaysia's DRB-Hicom Defence Technologies (DefTech), designation of the vehicle was AV4 Lipanbara.
- Indonesia:
  - Indonesian Army - Unknown number in service. First unveiled at Indonesian Army Anniversary 2019.
- Bhutan:
  - 15 with First Win Command, First Win II, First Win ATV and First Win Ambulance, to be used in the United Nations Peacekeeping Mission under the United Nations Multidimensional Integrated Stabilization Mission (MINUSCA) at Central African Republic and elsewhere around the world.
  - 10 FW ATVs delivered to the Royal Bhutan Police on May 27, 2024.
- Pakistan:
  - On October 11 2024, Islamabad signed a memorandum of understanding with the Thai government, in order to acquire 100 Chaiseri First Win vehicles, designed for protection against ambushes and IEDs. These mine-resistant vehicles are set to enhance the Pakistan Army’s ability to operate in difficult environments, marking a significant step in the defence cooperation between Thailand and Pakistan. The vehicles are locally built by Heavy Industries Taxila as HIT Hisar. Induction started in 2026.

=== Cancelled orders ===
- Philippines:
  - Clark International Airport Authority - First Wins ordered in 2015. It's been reported in 2017 that the order was officially cancelled due to budget reasons.
