= BugSat 1 =

Argentine microsatellite

- Names: Tita
- Mission type: Technology demonstration
- Operator: Satellogic
- COSPAR ID: 2014-033E
- SATCAT no.: 40014

Spacecraft properties
- Spacecraft: Tita
- Bus: BugSat
- Manufacturer: Satellogic
- Launch mass: 25 kilograms (55 pounds)
- Dimensions: 27.5 by 50 by 50 centimeters (10.8 by 19.7 by 19.7 inches)

Start of mission
- Launch date: 19 June 2014
- Rocket: Dnepr
- Launch site: Dombarovsky Air Base, Yasny LC-370/13
- Contractor: ISC Kosmotras

Orbital parameters
- Reference system: Geocentric orbit
- Regime: Low Earth orbit
- Perigee altitude: 570.0 kilometers (354.2 miles)
- Apogee altitude: 612.8 kilometers (380.8 miles)
- Inclination: 97.9 °
- Period: 96.4 minutes

BugSat 1 (nickname Tita) is an Argentine microsatellite launched on 19 June 2014. The satellite is built in a flattened-box shape, optimized for piggy-back launch. All instruments are powered by solar cells mounted on the spacecraft body. The satellite is running the Debian operating system.

== Launch ==
BugSat 1 was launched in a multi-satellite launch from Dombarovsky Air Base, site 13, Russia, on 19 June 2014 by a Dnepr rocket. Although there has been no official release, amateur radio operators have succeeded in downloading status data from the satellite.

== Mission ==
The satellite is intended primarily for technology verification in space, mostly of Earth observation telescope. Also, after the end of the primary mission phase, the satellite will serve the amateur radio community by providing a digipeater service.

== See also ==
- 2014 in spaceflight
