= Chaiseri =

Thai arms manufacturing company

Chaiseri Metal and Rubber Co., Ltd.
- Native name: บริษัท ชัยเสรีเม็ททอลแอนด์รับเบอร์ จำกัด
- Type: Limited company
- Industry: Defence
- Founded: 1939; 87 years ago
- Headquarters: Pathum Thani, Thailand
- Area served: Worldwide
- Key people: Hiran Koolhiran (MD); Nopparat Kulhiran (VP)
- Products: Armoured fighting vehicle
- Website: Official website

Chaiseri Metal and Rubber Co., Ltd. also known as just Chaiseri is a Thai defense company. Describing itself as a "defense land system specialist", Chaiseri designs, manufactures, and upgrades armoured vehicles, their subsystems, and track systems.

Besides being a supplier to the Royal Thai Army, the company exports to 37 countries including several Arab states, Argentina, Bangladesh, Chile, Denmark, Malaysia, Norway, Pakistan, Philippines, Sweden, Russia, Singapore, Ukraine.

== History ==
Chaiseri got its start as a specialist in rubber and rubber-to-metal bonded parts such as torque rods and rubber bumpers for commercial cargo trucks. They then moved to producing track shoes and road wheels for Royal Thai Army tracked armoured vehicles.

Chaiseri then established a vehicle rebuild plant where they repaired and upgraded both wheeled and tracked vehicles, from small vehicles like M151 and Mercedes-Benz W460 to assault amphibious vehicles such as the AAVP7A1.

Chaiseri's business revolves around three product lines: its armoured defense vehicle, "First Win 4x4" (FW4x4). Chaiseri Run-Flat System permits wheeled vehicles with damaged tires to run 150 kilometres while flat. Chaiseri is a specialist in track systems and has aided in the design of many current track systems. Chaiseri Track System C108 enables track upgrades for tracked vehicles.

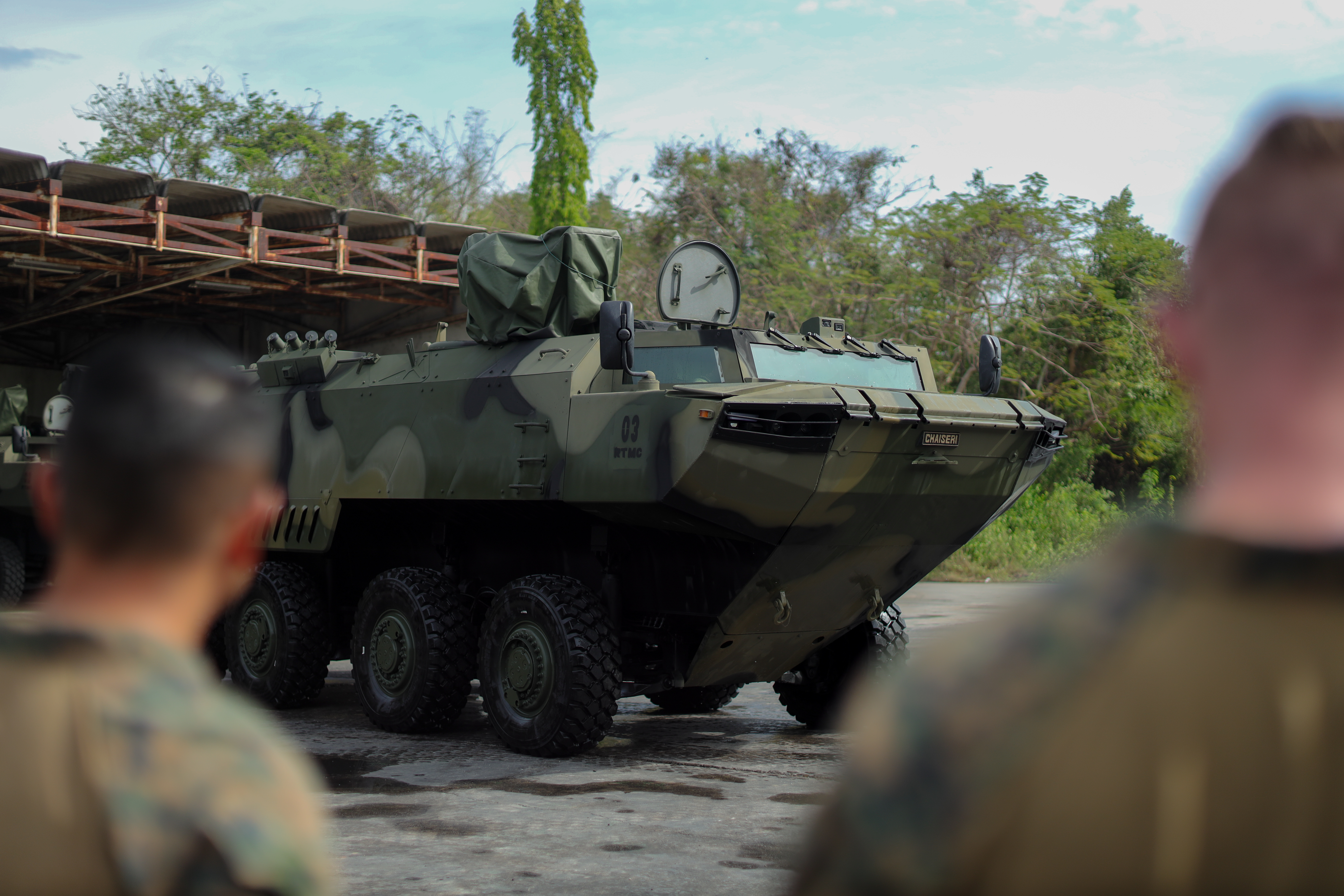
Armored Wheel Amphibious Vehicle during Exercise Cobra Gold 2025.

Chaiseri also manufactures Chaiseri AWAV (Armored Wheeled Amphibious Vehicle), an 8x8 amphibious APC.

== Awards ==
- Demark Design Excellence Award, 2011 for Chaiseri FW 4x4 armoured car.
- Prime Minister's Export Award, 2015 to Chaiseri for "Best Thai brand"
- Thailand Trust Mark
