= Maria Wonenburger =

Spanish mathematician (1927–2014)

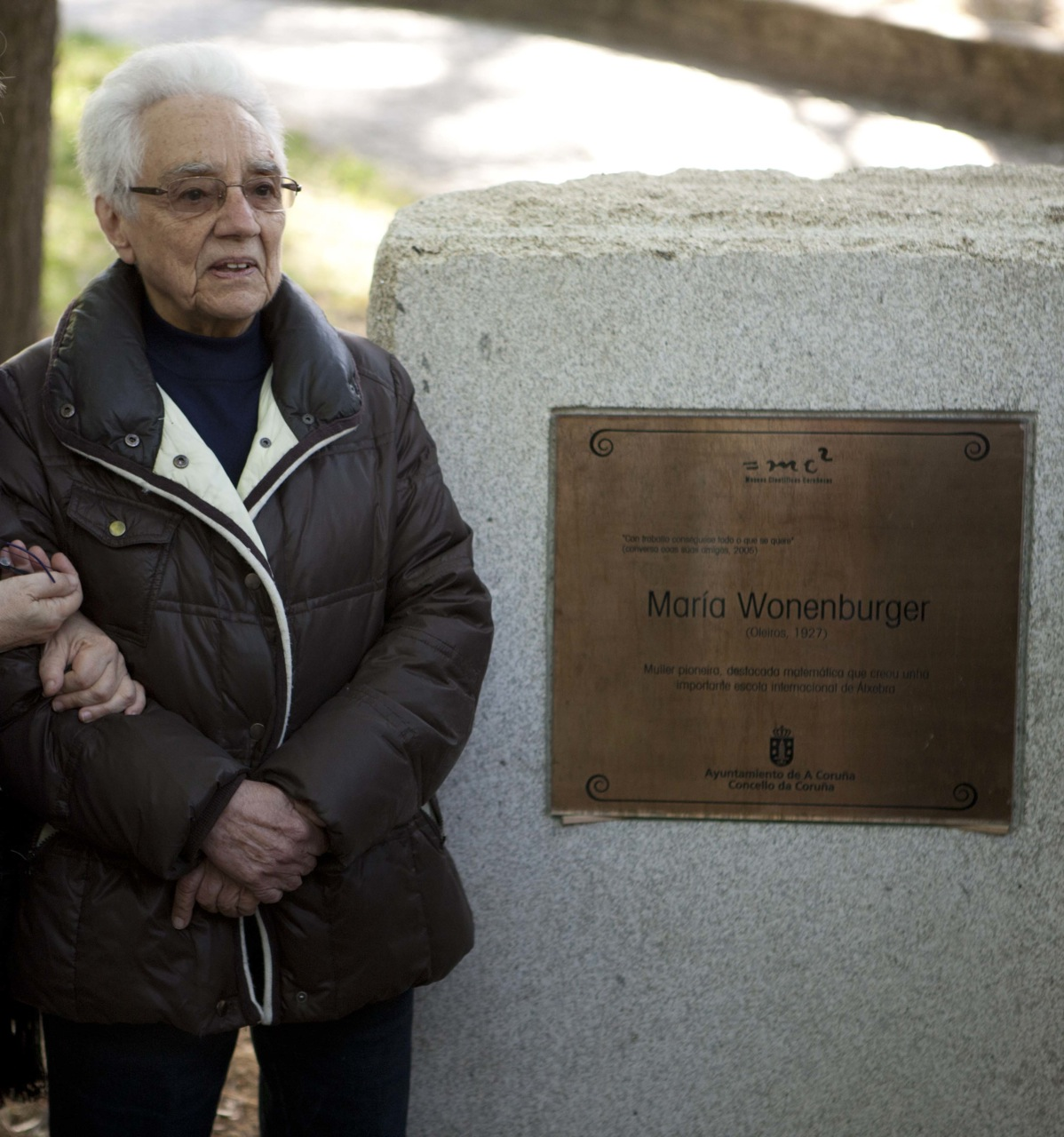
- Maria Wonenburger in 2011.
- Born: July 17, 1927; Montrove, Oleiros, Galicia
- Died: June 14, 2014 (aged 86); A Coruña, Galicia
- Education: Yale University (PhD)
- Scientific career
- Workplaces: University of Toronto; University of Buffalo; University of Indiana
- Thesis: On the Group of Similitudes and Its Projective Group (1957)
- Doctoral advisor: Nathan Jacobson
- Doctoral students: Robert Moody

María Josefa Wonenburger Planells (July 17, 1927 – June 14, 2014) was a Galician mathematician who did research in the United States and Canada. She is known for her work on group theory. She was the first Spaniard to obtain a Fulbright scholarship for doctoral studies in mathematics.

== Biography ==
Wonenburger's father's family was Alsatian and her mother's family was from Valencia. She had a passion for mathematics from an early age, though her parents wanted her to study engineering so that she could participate in the family business, a foundry. After completing her undergraduate studies at the Universidad Central de Madrid, now known as Complutense University of Madrid, she began her doctoral work there. A Fulbright scholar, her studies took her to Yale University where she completed her Ph.D. in 1957 under Nathan Jacobson. She returned to Spain three years later with a scholarship to Instituto de Matemáticas Jorge Juan del CSIC. At the end of the grant, she moved to Canada where her first PhD student was Robert Moody.

In 1966, she moved to the United States to teach at the University of Buffalo, and the following year, in 1967, she received a permanent post as a professor at the University of Indiana, where she remained until 1983. Because of her mother's illness, she returned to La Coruña in 1983, and remained away from the academic world, except some sporadic collaboration with institutions such as AGAPEMA. Her research mainly focused on group theory and the theory of Lie algebras. She studied the orthogonal group and its corresponding projective group. She directed eight doctoral theses; in addition to Moody, her students included Stephen Berman, Bette Warren, Edward George Gibson, and Richard Lawrence Marcuson.

== Honors and awards ==
Womnenburger was a member of the Royal Spanish Mathematical Society.

A school is named after her in Lugo, Galicia. She was also honored with a monolith in Santa Margarita park.

She received an honorary doctorate from the University of A Coruña.

In 2010, the Galician government and University of A Coruña established the María Josefa Wonenburger Planells Prize in her honor. The award recognizes women with achievements in science and technology.
