= Rose Dieng-Kuntz =

Senegalese computer scientist (1956–2008)

- Born: March 27, 1956; Dakar, Senegal
- Died: June 30, 2008 (aged 52)
- Education: École Polytechnique (PhD)
- Scientific career
- Fields: Computer science

Rose Dieng-Kuntz (March 27, 1956 – June 30, 2008) was a Senegalese computer scientist, who moved to France in 1976. She undertook significant research, becoming a major contributor to knowledge sharing and the semantic web, immediately after the availability of the World Wide Web. Winner of the Irène Joliot-Curie Prize, she was the first African woman to enroll in the celebrated French École polytechnique and her name is to be added to the Eiffel Tower.

== Early life and education ==
Rose Sophie Fatima Dieng-Kuntz was born on March 27, 1956, in Dakar, Senegal. Raised in a family of seven children, she excelled in her studies at Van Vollenhoven High School in Dakar, where she won several first prizes in the Senegalese General Competition and in 1972 passed her baccalauréat with highest honors.

In 1976, at the age of 20, she became the first African woman admitted to the École polytechnique in France. She continued her studies at the École Nationale Supérieure des Télécommunications (now Télécom Paris), where she earned an engineering degree in 1980. Dieng-Kuntz also completed a DEA (diploma of advanced studies) in computer science, followed by a PhD on the specification of parallelism at the University of Paris-Sud.

== Career ==
Her professional career began in 1985 at INRIA (National Institute for Research in Computer Science and Control), a French national research institution focusing on computer science, control theory and applied mathematics, where her research specialisation was on the sharing of knowledge over the World Wide Web.

In 1992, she became only the second woman to lead a research project at INRIA as scientific leader of the ACACIA research unit at INRIA Sophia Antipolis, a technology park near Nice in the south of France. Her research focused on knowledge sharing on the web, in the early days of the semantic web. ACACIA is an acronym for "Acquisition des Connaissances pour l'Assistance à la Conception par Interaction entre Agents" (knowledge acquisition for support in design by interaction between agents).

Michel Consard, director of INRIA Sophia Antopolis, emphasised Dieng-Kuntz's exceptional qualities as a researcher, in particular her foresight in investigating knowledge modelling and acquisition shortly after the invention of the World Wide Web and well before its widespread use.

Her key research focused on knowledge management and the semantic Web. Her interest in the semantic web began as early as 1998 when its importance to knowledge engineering was just beginning to emerge.

She was active in reaching out to students, and female students in particular, about her passion for science. In her words:

As far as the future is concerned, my vision is that of a web of knowledge linking individuals, organisations, countries and continents. The research we are aiming for seeks to improve cooperation between business and the community by building “knowledge webs,” a goal that is in phase with the Europe's target of evolving from an “information society” to a “knowledge society.”

When interviewed in January 2005 by Pierre Le Hir of Le Monde, Dieng-Kuntz confided that she was telling her life story "to show how a Black woman can thrive in scientific research as a welcome immigrant to France, and that there she can assume responsibilities and pass her passion on to young people, especially young women".

== Death and commemoration ==
She died in 2008 after a long illness. Her death received national media coverage. France's Minister of Higher Education and Research, Valérie Pécresse, expressed sadness, and released a statement announcing the death of Rose Dieng Kuntz: "France and the world of science have just lost a visionary mind and an immense talent".

== Awards and distinctions ==
- Irène Joliot-Curie Prize in 2005
- Chevalier de la Légion d’Honneur in 2006.

In 2026, Dieng-Kuntz was announced as one of 72 historical women in STEM whose names have been proposed to be added to the 72 men already celebrated on the Eiffel Tower as part of the Hypatia Project. It was at one time agreed that only French women should be included but Rose Dieng-Kuntz was one of the names that the original proposer of the idea, Benjamin Rigaud, said should be included in the initial list of just 40 names. The plan was announced by the Mayor of Paris, Anne Hidalgo following the recommendations of a committee led by Isabelle Vauglin of Femmes et Sciences and Jean-François Martins, representing the operating company which runs the Eiffel Tower.

== Selected publications ==
- (in English) (ed., in collaboration with Heinz Jürgen Müller), Computational conflicts : conflict modeling for distributed intelligent systems, 2000
- (in English) Designing cooperative systems: the use of theories and models, 2000
- (in English) (ed., in collaboration with Nada Mata), Knowledge management and organizational memories, 2002
- (in English) (ed., in collaboration with Parisa Ghodous and Geilson Loureiro), Leading the Web in concurrent engineering: next generation concurrent engineering
