= Royal Thai Naval Air Division =

Military unit

- กองบินทหารเรือ
- Royal Thai Navy Aircraft Marking
- Active: 7 December 1926
- Country: Thailand
- Branch: Royal Thai Navy
- Type: Naval aviation
- Size: 1,200 active personnel Approx. 49+ aircraft
- Anniversaries: 7 December

Insignia
- Roundel

The Royal Thai Naval Air Division or RTNAD (Thai: กองบินทหารเรือ) is the Naval aviation of the Royal Thai Navy. The division was officially established on 7 December 1926. The RTNAD has two air wings and one Flying Unit of HTMS Chakri Naruebet, operating 23 fixed-wing aircraft and 26 helicopters from U-Tapao, Songkhla, and Phuket. The First Royal Thai Navy wing has three squadrons; the Second Royal Thai Navy wing has three squadrons and another wing for HTMS Chakri Naruebet Flying Unit.

== History ==
The establishment Royal Thai Naval Air Division began in 1921, when the Admiral Prince Abhakara Kiartivongse gave an opinion to the Naval Command Council of Ministry of the Navy on 23 November 1921. The Naval Aviation Division was expedient to set up an air fleet using Sattahip as a base with 2 seaplanes. The Naval Command Council approved this proposal on 7 December 1926.

Later, the Royal Thai Naval Air Division has more aircraft living with Royal Thai Air Force Place there are some inconveniences so in 1957, the Navy built the Airport coming up at Ban Utapao, Rayong Province by using the navy budget during construction, the United States offered construction assistance and requested to use some parts of U-Tapao Royal Thai Navy Airfield in return.

== Structure ==
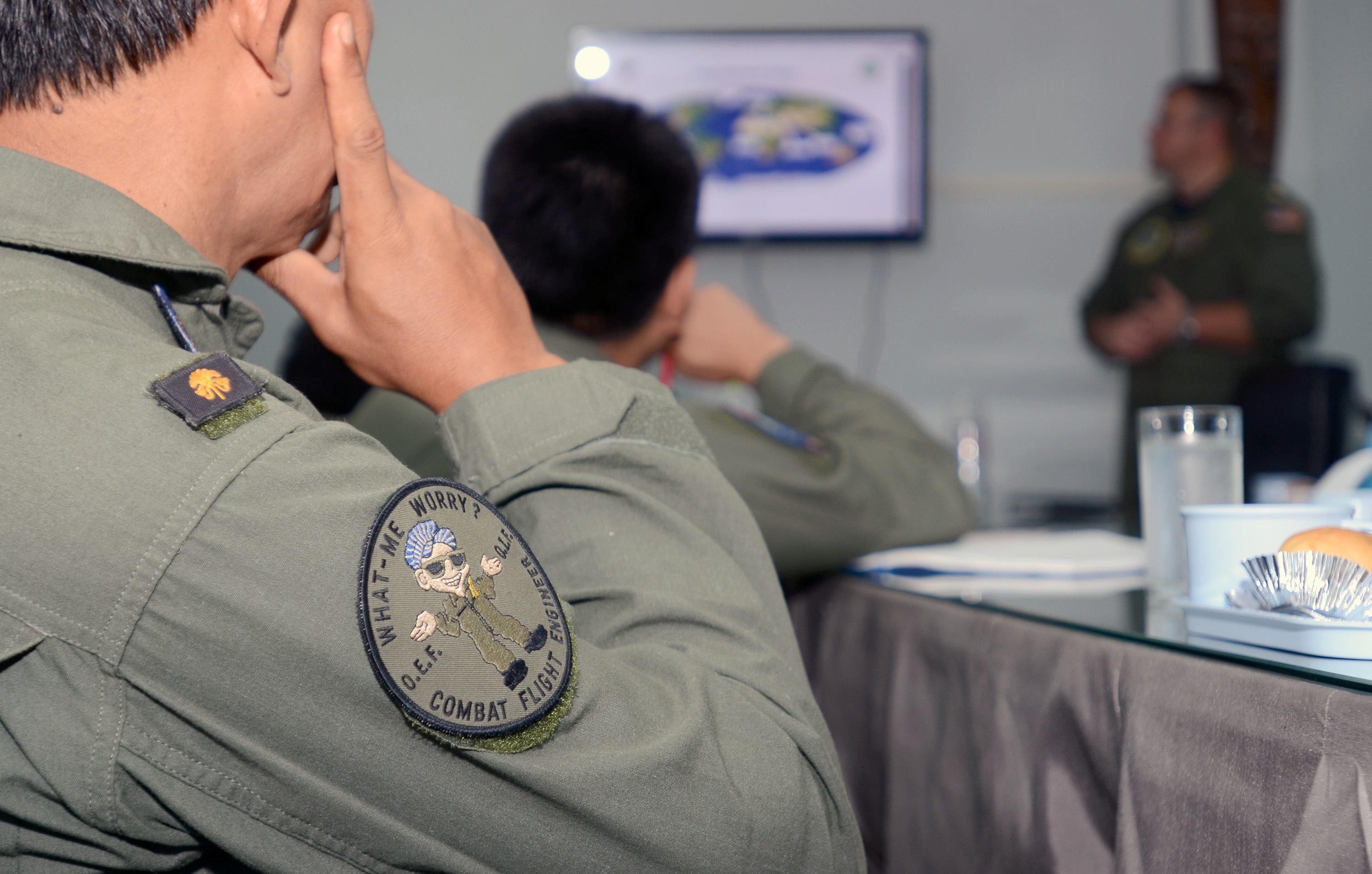
A Royal Thai Navy pilot shares best practices 4 June 2013

The headquarters of Royal Thai Naval Air Division has 10 commanding units as follows:

- Personnel Division
- Intelligence Division
- Operations Division
- Logistics Division
- Division of Communication and Information Technology
- Budget Division
- Technical Affairs and Flight Safety Division
- Division of Engineering Plans
- Administration Department
- Finance Department

=== Commands ===
Royal Thai Naval Air Division is a combat unit under commissioned of Royal Thai Fleet. The aviation division is divided into 6 regiments, corresponding to one additional command unit namely; Wing 1 Regiment, Wing 2 Regiment, Air Operations Control Regiment, The Flight Station Regiment, Aircraft Maintenance and Repair Center Regiment, Security Regiment and one additional command unit of HTMS Chakri Naruebet Flying Unit.

Royal Thai Navy Airfields
- Royal Thai Navy Airfields
  - U-Tapao RTNAF is used for operations over the northern Gulf of Thailand.
  - Songkhla RTNAF is used for operations over the southern Gulf of Thailand.
  - Phuket RTNAF is used for operations over the Andaman Sea (Indian Ocean).
  - Chanthaburi RTNAF used as a frontal operating airfield for the Royal Thai Marine Corps.
  - Narathiwat RTNAF is used as a frontal operating airfield for Royal Thai Marine Corps.
  - Nakorn Phanom RTNAF is used to support the Riverine Patrol Regiment based along the Mekong River.

Squadron	Status	Role	Type
Wing 1
101	Active	SAR	Maritime patrol aircraft
102	Active	ASuW and ASW	Maritime patrol aircraft
103	Active	Forward air control	Maritime patrol aircraft
104	Active	Maritime surveillance	Unmanned aerial vehicle
Wing 2
201	Active	Military transport	Maritime patrol aircraft
202	Active	Military transport	Helicopter
203	Active	ASuW and Military transport	Helicopter
HTMS Chakri Naruebet Flying Unit
1	Inactive		
2	Active	ASW, HADR and Military transport	Helicopter

=== Squadrons ===
The following squadrons are currently active with the Royal Thai Naval Division.

Squadron	Equipment	Wing	RTAF Base	Notes
101 Naval Air Squadron	Dornier 228	Naval Air Wing 1	U-Tapao	
102 Naval Air Squadron	Fokker F27	Naval Air Wing 1	U-Tapao	
103 Naval Air Squadron	Cessna 337 Super Skymaster	Naval Air Wing 1	U-Tapao	
104 Naval Air Squadron	Schiebel Camcopter S-100, Aeronautics Defense Orbiter	Naval Air Wing 1	U-Tapao	
201 Naval Air Squadron	Fokker F27, Embraer ERJ-135LR	Naval Air Wing 2	U-Tapao	
202 Naval Air Squadron	Bell 212, Eurocopter EC145	Naval Air Wing 2	U-Tapao	
203 Naval Air Squadron	Sikorsky S-76, Super Lynx 300	Naval Air Wing 2	U-Tapao	
1 HTMS Chakri Naruebet Flying Squadron		HTMS Chakri Naruebet Flying Unit	U-Tapao	
2 HTMS Chakri Naruebet Flying Squadron	SH-70B Seahawk, MH-60S Knighthawk	HTMS Chakri Naruebet Flying Unit	U-Tapao	

== Aircraft ==
=== Active aircraft ===
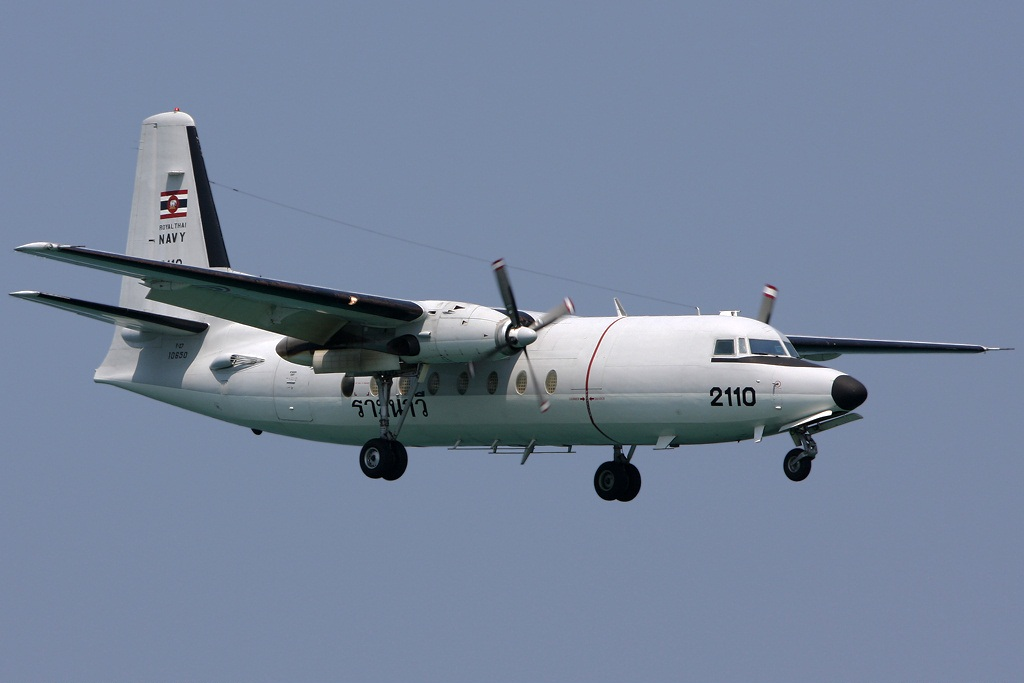
Royal Thai Navy Fokker27-MK 400

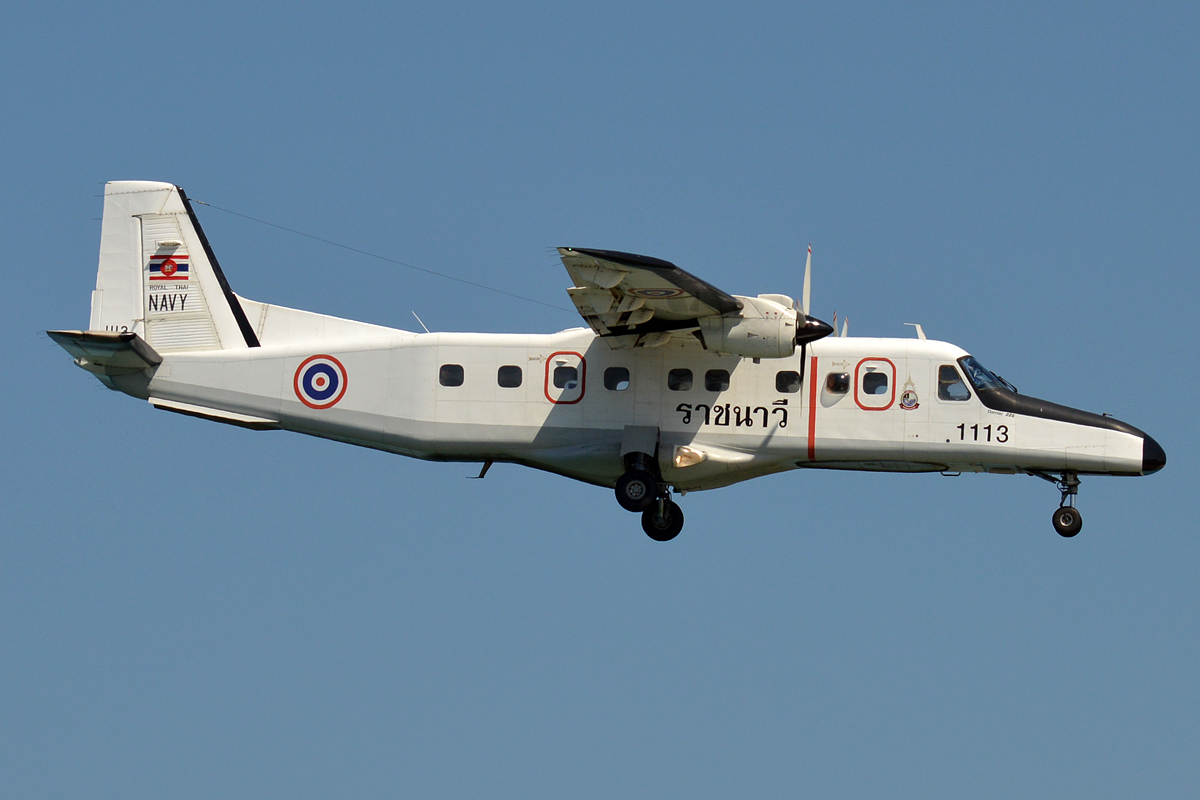
Dornier Do-228-212

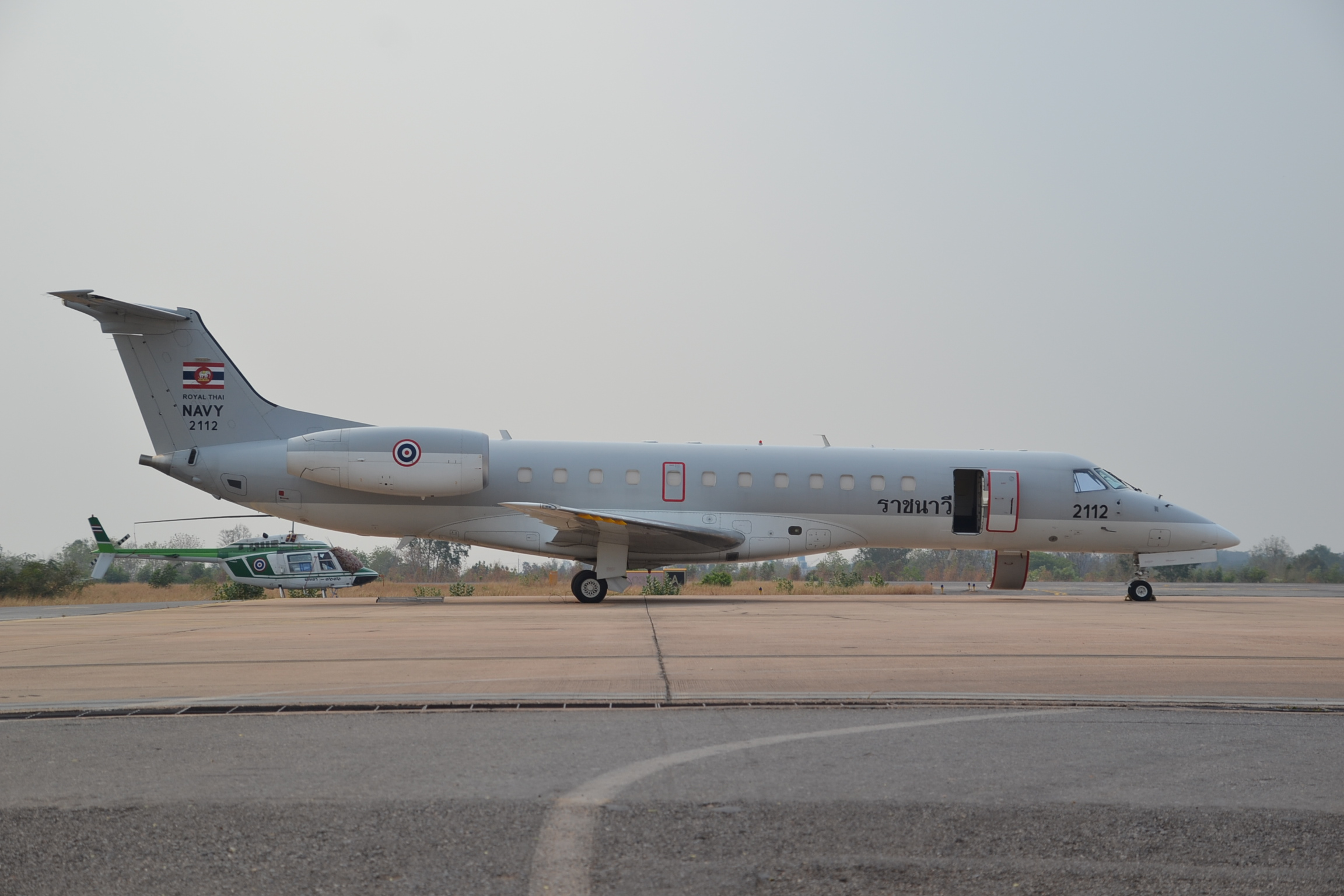
Embraer ERJ-135LR of the Royal Thai Navy

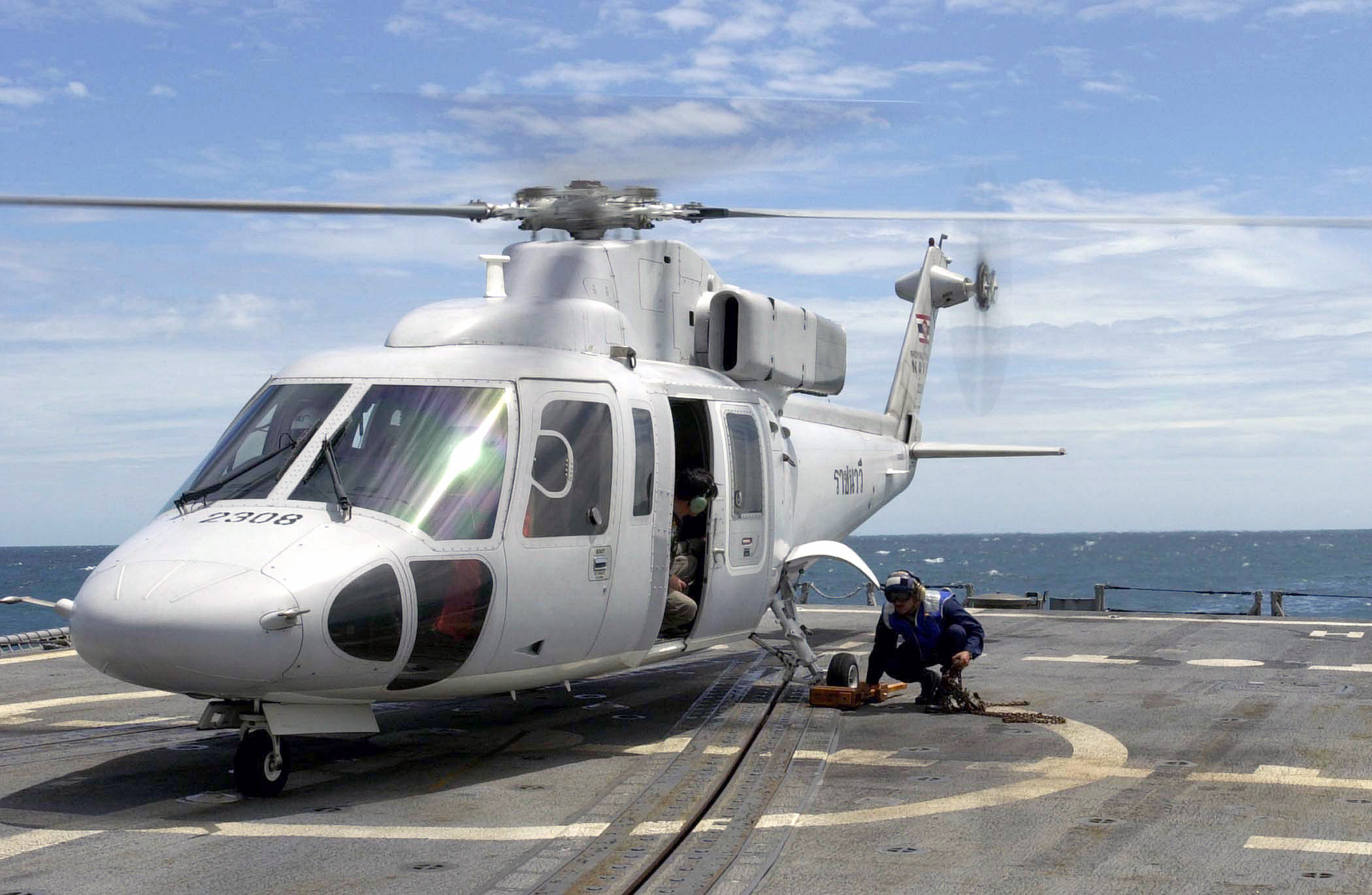
Royal Thai Navy Sikorksy S-76B

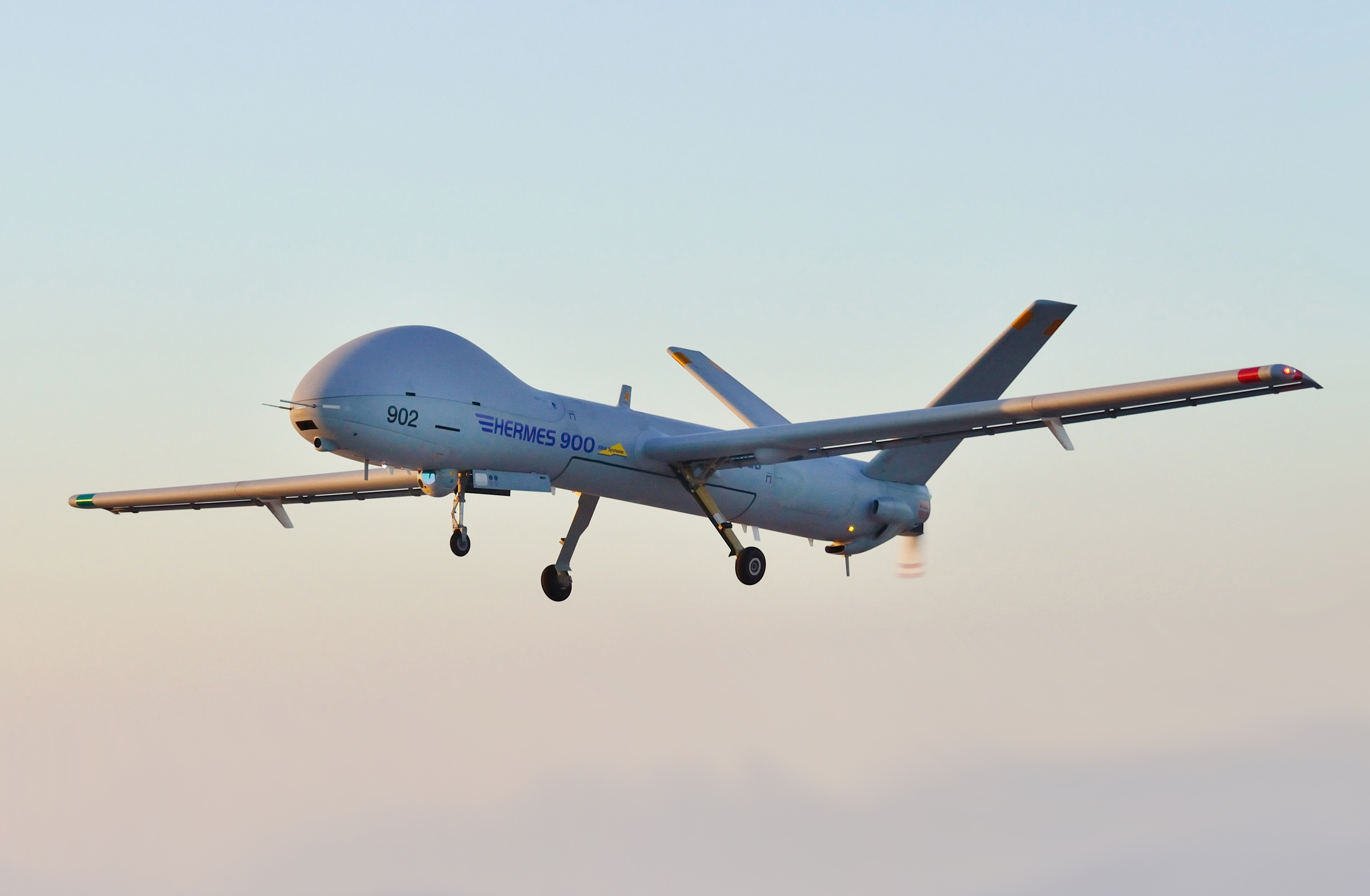
Elbit Hermes 900

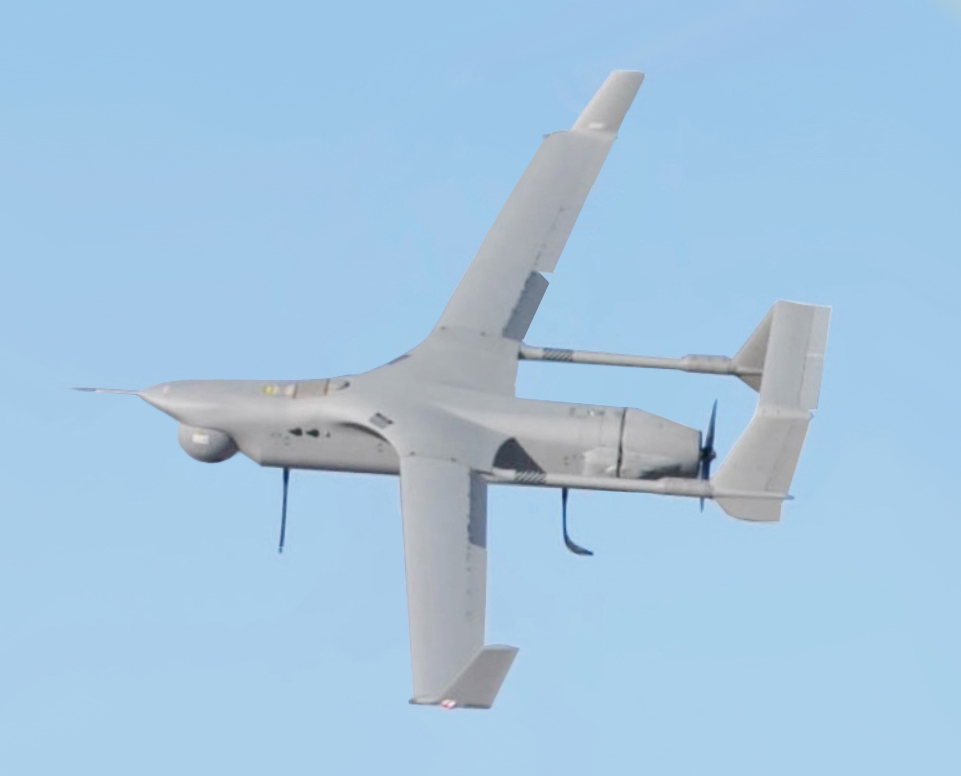
Boeing Insitu RQ-21 Blackjack

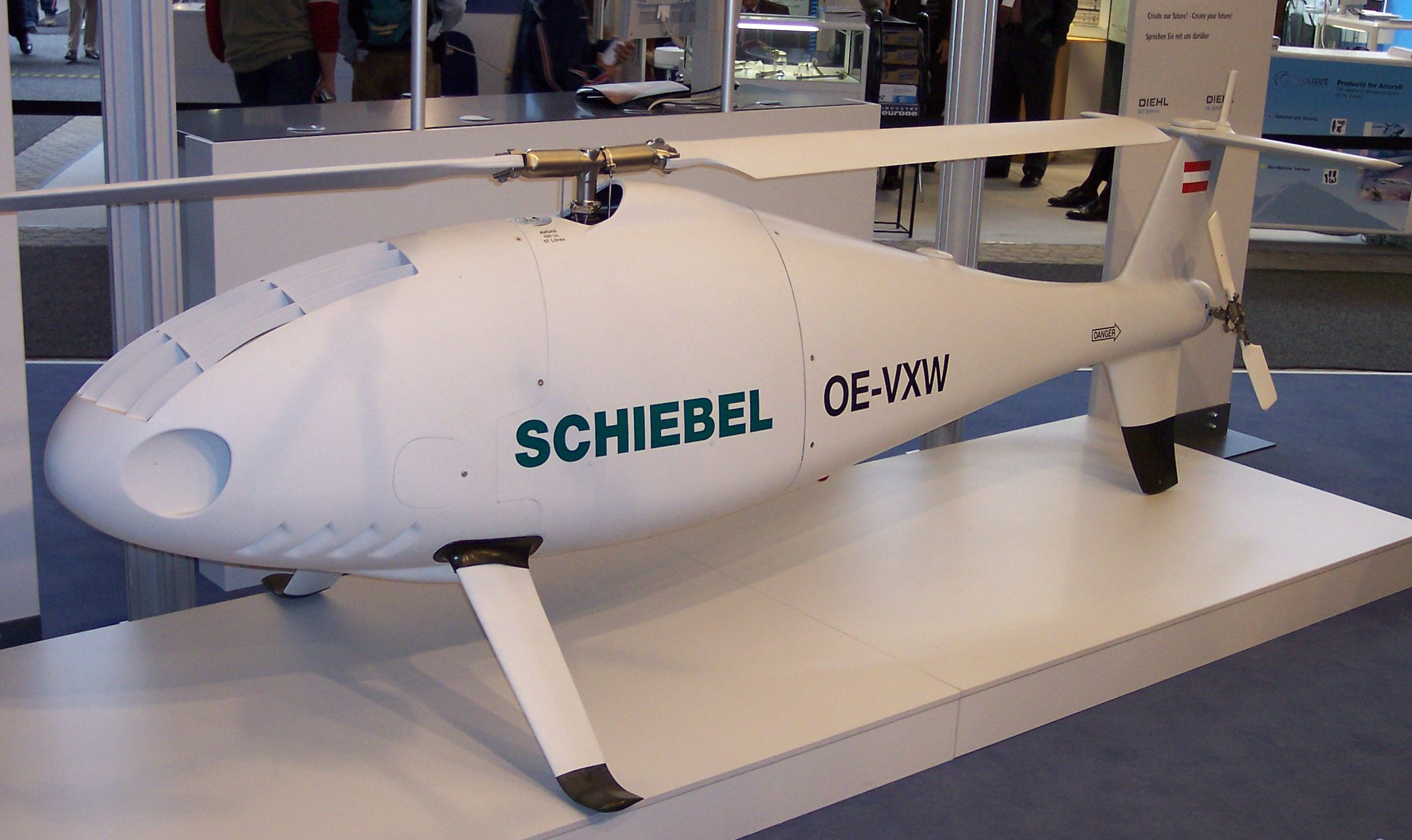
Camcopter S-100

Aircraft	Origin	Type	RTN Designation	In service	Notes
Maritime patrol aircraft
Airbus C295	France	Search and rescue	—	2	On order.
Dornier 228	Germany	Search and rescue	B.LW.1	7	Also used in Royal Rain Project.
Cessna 337 Super Skymaster	United States	FAC aircraft	B.TCh.1	4 3 2	H-SP SP G
NAX seaplane	Thailand	Search and rescue	—	4	Serial no.s NAX-01 to NAX-04, locally built by Naval Aircraft Experimental.
Military transport aircraft
Fokker F27	Netherlands	Military transport	B.LL.1	2 MK400	
Embraer ERJ-135LR	Brazil	VIP transport aircraft	B.LL.2	2	
Helicopter
S-70B-7 Seahawk	United States	Anti-submarine warfare	H.PD.1	6	HTMS Chakri Naruebet Flying Unit.
MH-60S Knighthawk	United States	Military transport	H.LL.5	2	HTMS Chakri Naruebet Flying Unit.
WestlandSuper Lynx 300	United Kingdom	Anti-surface warfare	H.TPh.1	2	
Eurocopter EC145	Germany	Military transport	H.LL.6	5	
Bell UH-1N Twin Huey	United States	Military transport	H.LL.2	7	
Sikorsky S-76B	United States	Search and rescue, Military transport	H.LL.4	5	
Surveillance Unmanned Aerial Vehicles
Aeronautics Orbiter 3B	Israel	Surveillance Unmanned Aerial Vehicles	—	Unknown	In use since 2020.
Elbit Hermes 900	Israel	Surveillance Unmanned Aerial Vehicles	—	Unknown	Ordered in 2022.
Aeronautics Defense Dominator	Israel	Surveillance Unmanned Aerial Vehicles	—	Unknown	[Documented by a few sources, not yet seen].
Boeing Insitu RQ-21 Blackjack	United States	Surveillance Unmanned Aerial Vehicles	—	Unknown	[Documented by a few sources, not yet seen].
DTI U-1 'Sky Scout'	Thailand	Surveillance Unmanned Aerial Vehicles	—	Unknown	It is unknown whether they are only in the army service. (In use since 2017.)
DTI D-Eyes 02	Thailand	Surveillance Unmanned Aerial Vehicles	—	Unknown	It is unknown whether they are only in the army service. (In use since 2017.)
VTOL Surveillance Unmanned Aerial Vehicles
TOP Falcon-V	China; Thailand	VTOL Surveillance Unmanned Aerial Vehicles	—	Unknown	In use since 2017.
Narai 3.0	Thailand	VTOL Surveillance Unmanned Aerial Vehicles	—	Unknown	In use since 2018. (In use with the Navy and Armed Forces HQ).
Schiebel Camcopter S-100	Austria	VTOL Surveillance Unmanned Aerial Vehicles	—	Unknown	In use since 2020.
NRDO MARCUS-B	Thailand	VTOL Surveillance Unmanned Aerial Vehicles	—	Unknown	In use since 2020. (For use on board the Chakri Naruebet aircraft carrier).

=== Historic aircraft ===
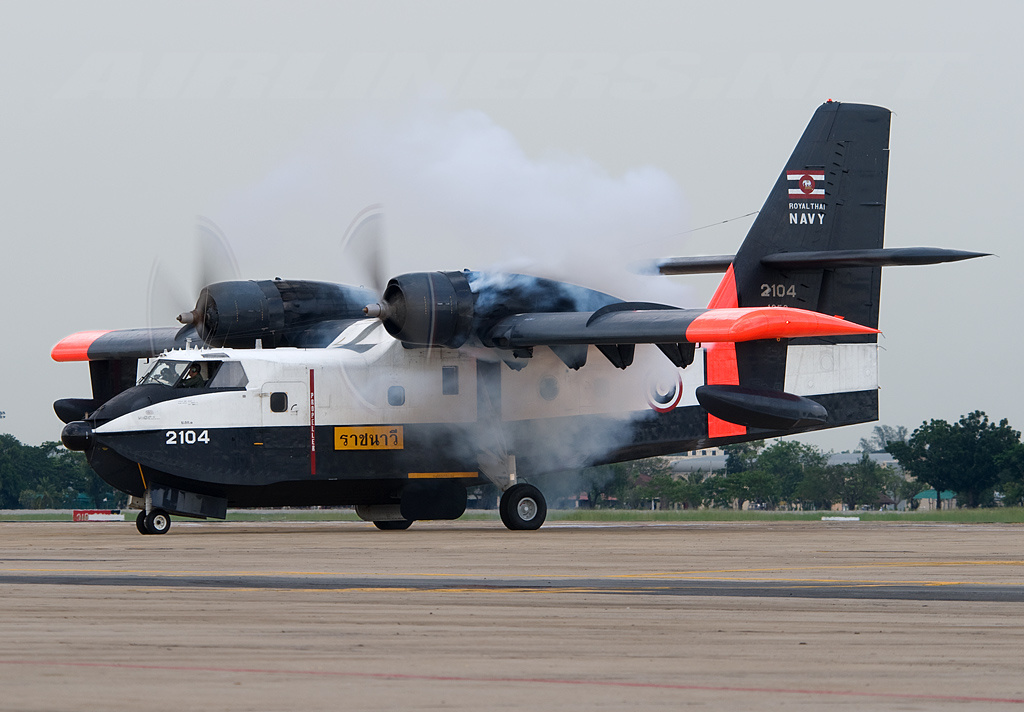
Canadair CL-215

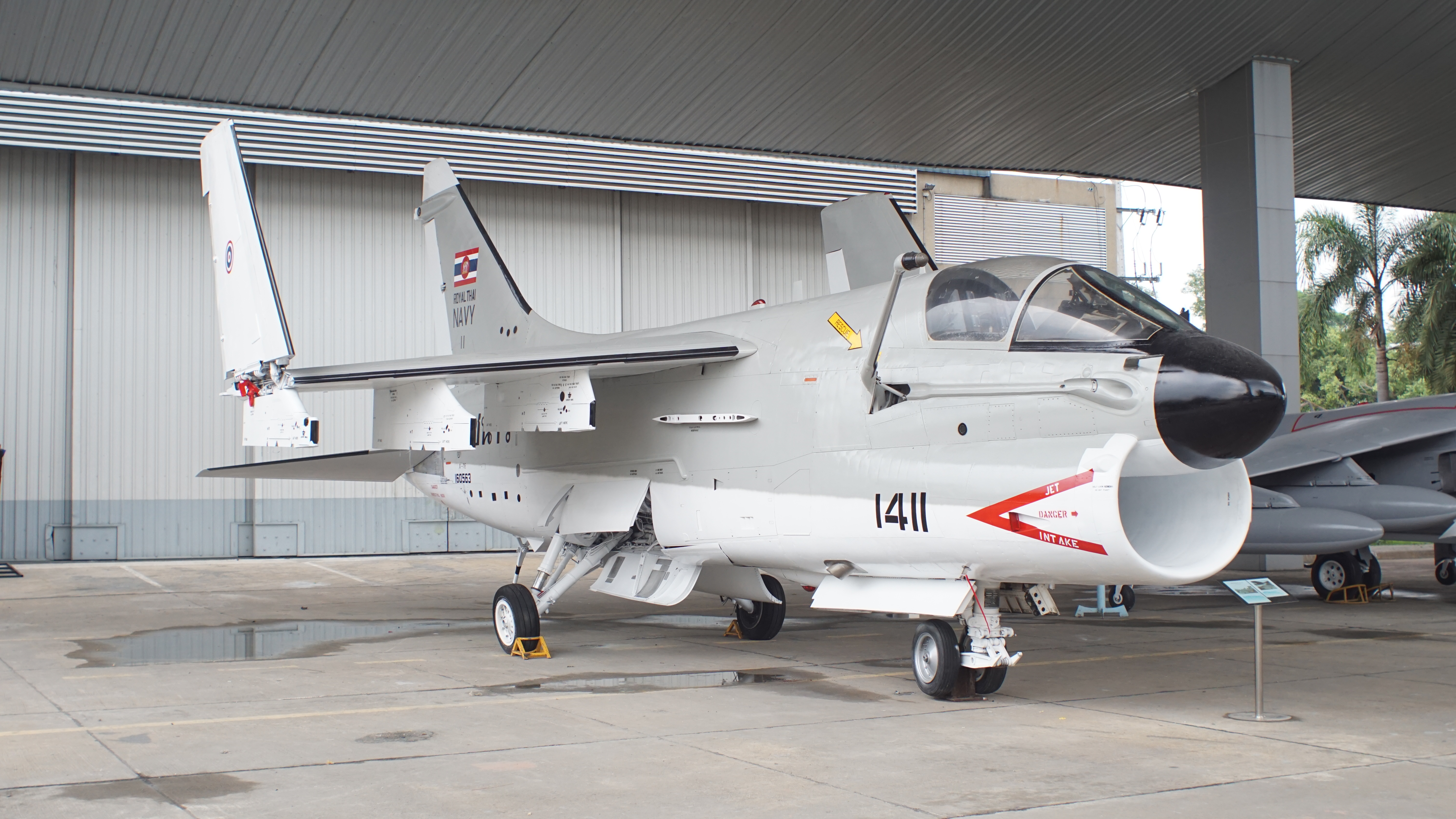
A-7E Corsair II

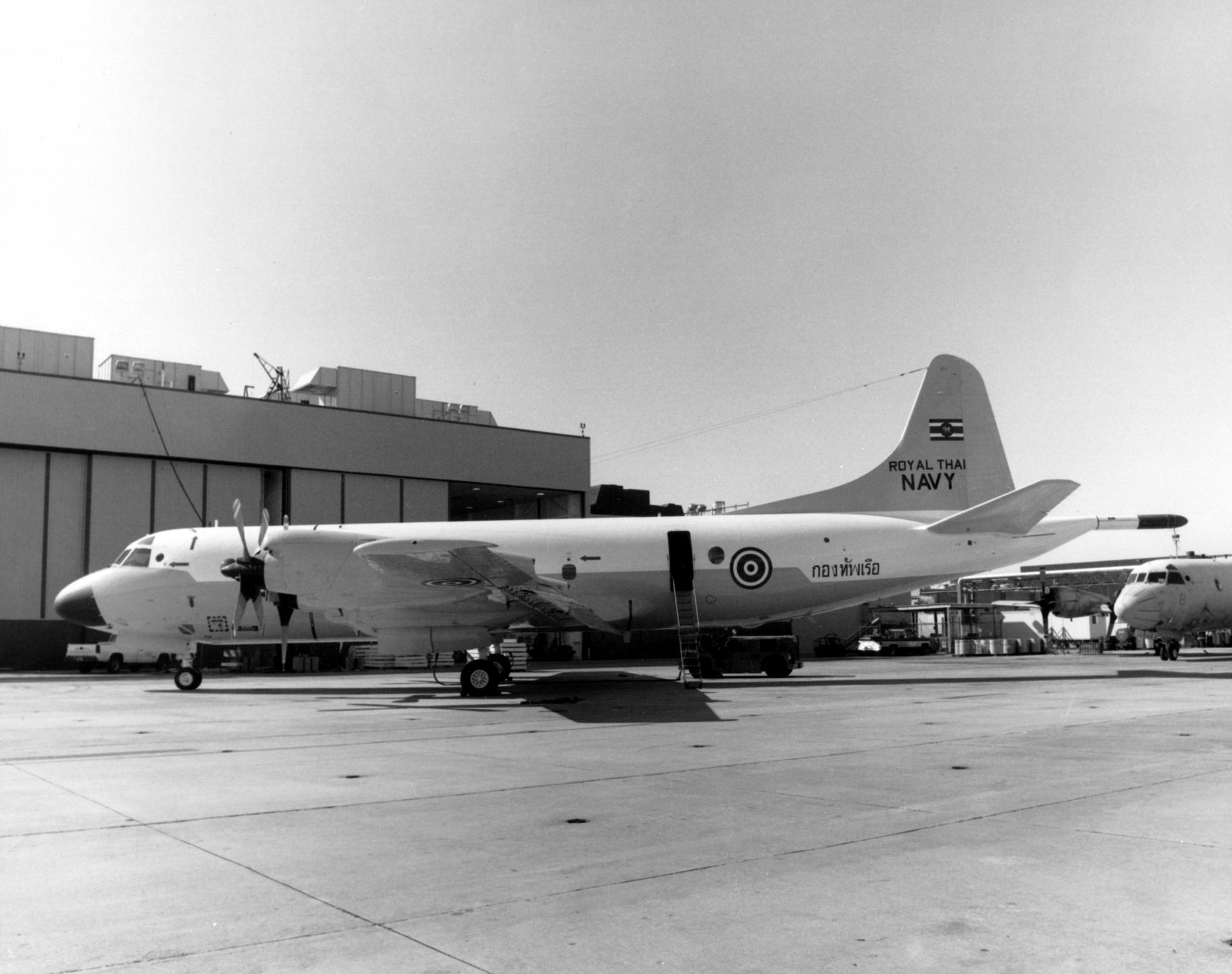
Lockheed P-3 Orion

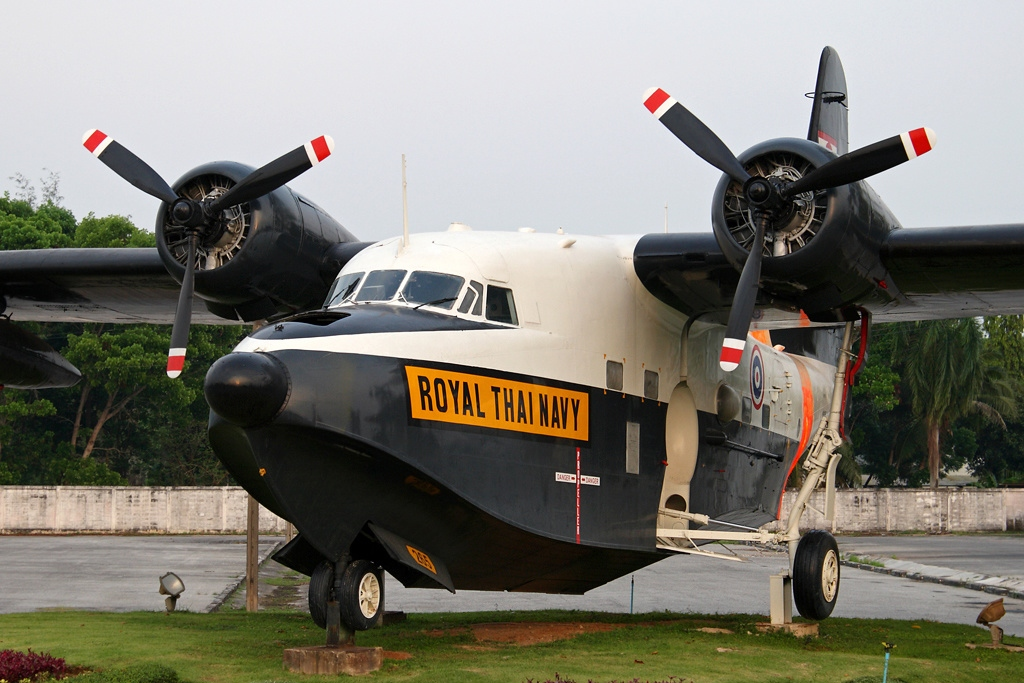
Grumman HU-16B Albatross

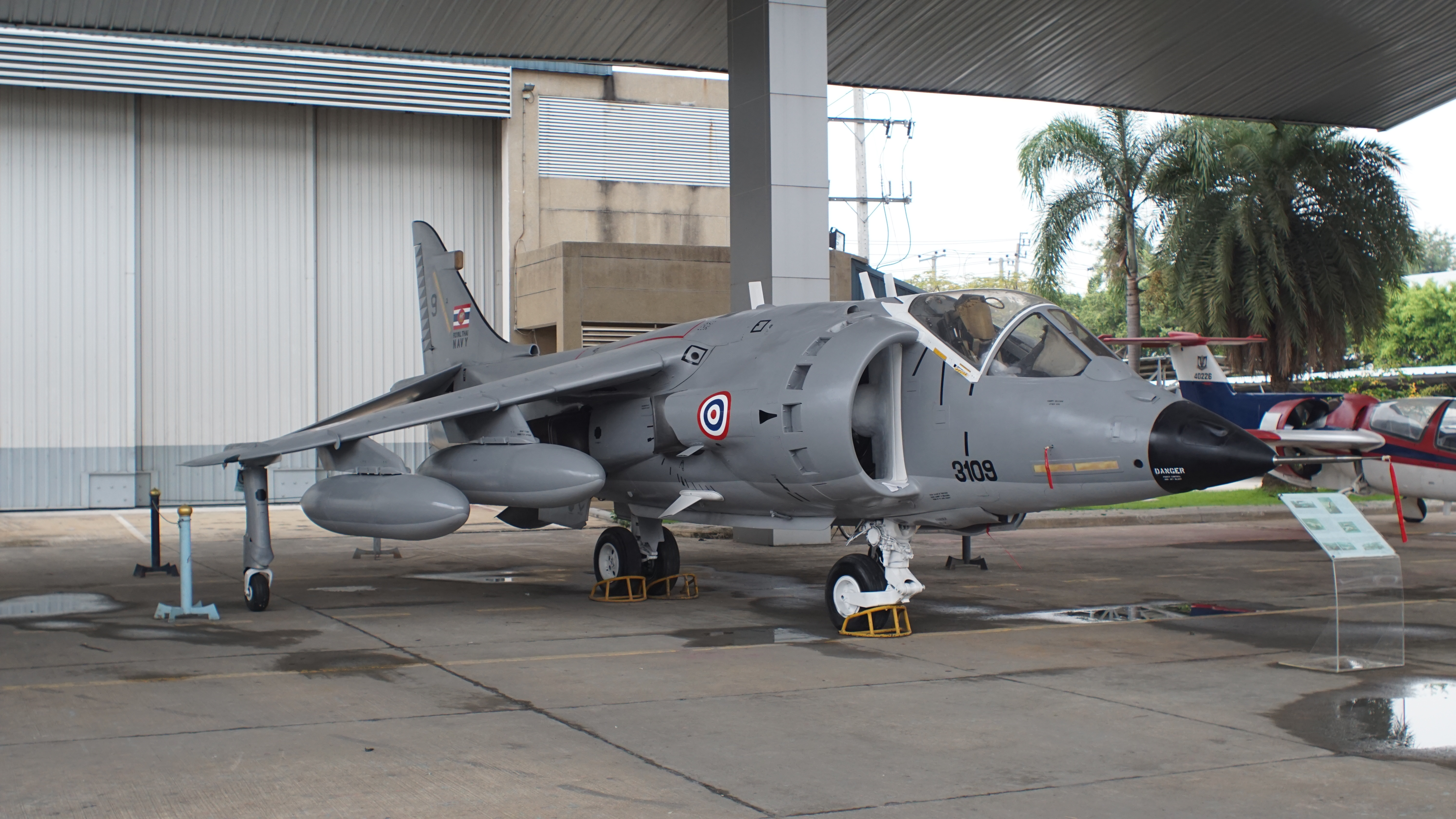
AV-8S Matador

Aircraft	Origin	Type	Service	Quantity	Notes
Avro 504N	Thailand; United Kingdom	Trainer	1929–1948	2	Built locally.
WS-103S	Japan	Reconnaissance	1938–1946	6	
Nakajima E8N	Japan	Reconnaissance	1938–1946	27	
Aichi E13A	Japan	Reconnaissance	1939-1945+	6	Three aircraft ordered in 1939 and three in 1941.
Beechcraft 35 Bonanza	United States	Reconnaissance	1948–1951	3	
Piper Pa-11	United States	Reconnaissance	1949–1951	2	
Fairey Firefly	United Kingdom	Fighter	1951-1951	12	10 F Mk. 1 and 2 T Mk. 2
de Havilland Tiger Moth	United Kingdom	Trainer	1951-1951	30	
Curtiss SB2C Helldiver	United States	Bomber	1951–1955	6	
Grumman HU-16D	United States	SAR	1962–1981	3	
Grumman S-2 Tracker	United States	ASW	1966–1999	12	
Cessna O-1G Bird Dog	United States	Reconnaissance	1968–1997	8	
Cessna U-17	United States	Reconnaissance	1974–1997	8	
Bell 205 UH-1H	United States	Utility helicopter	1975–??	4	
Douglas C-47 Skytrain	United States	Military transport	1978–1999	13	
Canadair CL-215	Canada	SAR	1978–2017	2	
GAF N.24A Normad	Australia	Military transport	1984–2015	5	
Fokker F27	Netherlands	Military transport	1984-2023	3	200 MAR Anti-submarine warfare version
Bell 214ST	United States	Utility helicopter	1987–2010	5	
LTV A-7E Corsair II	United States	Attack	1995–2007	21	All airframes stored.
Lockheed P-3 Orion	United States	ASW	1996–2014	5	Second-hand but modernized before delivery
Hawker Siddeley AV-8S Matador	United Kingdom	Attack	1997–2006	9	Second hand from the Spanish Navy Spanish Navy Air Army Used on HTMS Chakri Naruebet.

== Rank structure ==
Equivalent NATO Code	OF-10	OF-9	OF-8	OF-7	OF-6	OF-5	OF-4	OF-3	OF-2	OF-1		Cadet Officer
Officer ranks
Officer ranks	จอมพลเรือ	พลเรือเอก	พลเรือโท	พลเรือตรี	พลเรือจัตวา^{1}	นาวาเอก	นาวาโท	นาวาตรี	เรือเอก	เรือโท	เรือตรี	นักเรียนนายเรือ
Officer ranks	Admiral of the Fleet	Admiral	Vice Admiral	Rear Admiral	Commodore or Rear Admiral (lower half)^{1}	Captain	Commander	Lieutenant Commander	Lieutenant	Lieutenant; Junior Grade	Sub Lieutenant	Midshipman
Officer ranks	^{1}Rank on paper, not actually used in the Royal Thai Navy.

Equivalent NATO Code	OR-9		OR-8	OR-7	OR-5	OR-4	OR-3	OR-1
Enlisted ranks								No insignia
Enlisted ranks	พันจ่าเอกพิเศษ	พันจ่าเอก	พันจ่าโท	พันจ่าตรี	จ่าเอก	จ่าโท	จ่าตรี	พลทหาร
Enlisted ranks	Master Chief Petty; Officer	Senior Chief Petty; Officer	Chief Petty; Officer	Petty Officer; 1st class	Petty Officer; 2nd Class	Petty Officer; 3rd Class	Seaman	Seaman apprentice

== See also ==
- Admiral Prince Abhakara Kiartivongse
- Royal Thai Armed Forces Headquarters
- Military of Thailand
- Royal Thai Army Aviation Center
- Royal Thai Army
- Royal Thai Air Force
- Royal Thai Marine Corps
- Royal Thai Naval Academy
