= Paramilitary Marine Regiment =

Special operations force of the Royal Thai Marine Corps

Paramilitary Marine Regiment Royal Thai Navy
- กรมทหารพรานนาวิกโยธิน กองทัพเรือ
- Active: 1977–present
- Country: Thailand
- Branch: Royal Thai Navy
- Type: Paramilitary
- Size: Regiment (~1,622)
- Part of: Royal Thai Marine Corps
- Garrison/HQ: Sattahip, Chonburi
- Nicknames: นักรบดำ (Black Warrior) เหยี่ยวดำ (Black Kestrel) ประดู่เหล็ก (Iron Padauk)
- Colors: Black
- Mascot: Black Kite
- Engagements: Cold War; Communist insurgency in Thailand; Communist insurgency in Malaysia; Vietnamese border raids in Thailand; Southern Insurgency
- Website: marines paramilitary

The Paramilitary Marine Regiment, Royal Thai Navy or Thahan Phran Marines (Thai: กรมทหารพรานนาวิกโยธิน กองทัพเรือ) is a paramilitary marine forces in the Royal Thai Marine Corps (RTMC). It falls under the command of the RTMC, which has been approved in the establishment of the Thailand Ministry of Defence (MOD). It is considered to be the most powerful combat unit of the Royal Thai Marine Paramilitary Force.

The difference between the Royal Thai Army Paramilitary Forces and the Paramilitary Marine Forces is that the Paramilitary Marine Forces receive additional training in amphilibious warfare to fulfill the missions of the RTMC, which is the parent unit. However, they mostly operate in mountain forest areas.

Since the South Thailand insurgency crisis, the Paramilitary Marine Regiment has been intensifying its training in anti-irrgular forces with small unit tactics. They are currently one of the most important paramilitary forces of the Thai military, which plays a role in border security and counterinsurgency in the Southern Thailand.

== History ==
The Paramilitary Marine Regiment was originally founded during the years 1977-1978 due to a serious threat from a insurgent forces (Thailand uses the term communist terrorist) attack during the Communist insurgency in Thailand. Especially along the border it was organized by the local population because of a perception problem in the areas.

Royal Thai Armed Forces Headquarters (RTARF) has agreed to perform on June 21, 1978, Cabinet of Thailand including approved on July 18, 1978, by the Royal Thai Army Special Operation Center 315, a control unit supervisor and training in Pak Chong, Nakhon Ratchasima. After the training was completed, the Royal Thai Army Special Operation Center 315 assigned Paramilitary Marine Regiment to take over operational control with the Chanthaburi and Trat Border Defense Command (CTBDC).

The attire at that time was woodland camouflage while performing small unit combat duties against insurgent forces, and there was no fixed unit location. Before changing to black uniforms in the same style as the Royal Thai Army Paramilitary Forces, but still using the green camouflage beret as the identity of the Paramilitary Marine Forces.

After fighting to Communist insurgency in Thailand. Changed its mission to protect the country especially the eastern border area where has problems with drug smuggling and various illegal activities, and RTMC need to expand accordingly. They include Troops are stationed Marines and volunteers.

Paramilitary Marine Regiment was re-established in 2019 due to the Government of Thailand and Internal Security Operations Command (ISOC) has reduced forces in tackling the unrest in South Thailand insurgency.

The Royal Thai Navy (RTN) has approved the establishment of a Paramilitary Marine Regiment by The Cabinet of Thai on May 24, 2016, to coincide with the RTMC.

== Mission ==
- Border security and patrolling border areas in collaboration with Chanthaburi and Trat Border Defense Command (CTBDC), because the border area is adjacent to Kingdom of Cambodia and there is sensitivity in the matter of disputed areas, especially in the matter of using military force to protect the border.
- Counterinsurgency in South Thailand insurgency with a moderate policy rather than using violence.
- Helping people in collaboration with other agencies in the areas of responsibility who are affected by natural disasters.
- Protecting people along the border in the areas under the responsibility of the Royal Thai Navy.
- Protecting the Thailand southern border areas that borders Malaysia.
- Supporting amphibious warfare operations.
- Supporting suppress illegal acts in the border areas under responsibility with other law enforcement agencies.

== Organization ==
- Paramilitary Marine 16 Companies
- 1st Female Paramilitary Marine 1 Platoon

=== Paramilitary Marine Regiment ===
- 1st Paramilitary Marine Company
- 2nd Paramilitary Marine Company
- 3rd Paramilitary Marine Company
- 4th Paramilitary Marine Company
- 5th Paramilitary Marine Company
- 6th Paramilitary Marine Company
- 7th Paramilitary Marine Company
- 8th Paramilitary Marine Company
- 9th Paramilitary Marine Company
- 10th Paramilitary Marine Company
- 11th Paramilitary Marine Company
- 12th Paramilitary Marine Company
- 13th Paramilitary Marine Company
- 14th Paramilitary Marine Company
- 15th Paramilitary Marine Company
- 16th Paramilitary Marine Company
- 1st Female Paramilitary Marine Platoon

== Weapons ==
=== Small arms ===
Name	Type	Caliber	Origin	Notes
Type 86	Semi-automatic pistol	.45 ACP	Thailand	M1911A1 pistol produced under license.
Type 56-1	Assault rifle	7.62×39mm	China
Type 11	Assault rifle	5.56×45mm	Thailand	Thai license produced version of the Heckler & Koch HK33.
M16A1/A2/A4	Assault rifle	5.56×45mm	United States	Standard infantry rifle. Aging M16A1 will be replaced by IMI Tavor TAR-21 and M16A4.
M4A1 Carbine	Assault rifle	5.56×45mm	United States	Used by special forces. Some were equipped with SOPMOD kit.
M60 machine gun	General purpose machine gun	7.62×51mm	United States	Former main GPMG being replaced by FN MAG 58
Type 56 LMG	Light machine gun	7.62×39mm	China
M203	Underbarrel grenade launcher	40×46mm SR	United States
M79	Single-shot grenade launcher	40×46mm grenade	United States
Type 56 RPG	Rocket-propelled grenade		China
Type 69 RPG	Rocket-propelled grenade		China
