= Royal Thai Marine Corps =

Branch of the Thai armed forces

- หน่วยบัญชาการนาวิกโยธิน
- Royal Thai Marine Corps insignia
- Founded: 2 March 1913
- Country: Thailand
- Allegiance: King of Thailand
- Branch: Royal Thai Navy
- Type: Marines
- Size: 23,000 active personnel
- Garrison/HQ: RTMC headquarters, Sattahip, Chonburi
- Nickname: "นย." "Nor Yor" Abbreviation of Marines
- Mottos: กาย ใจ ชีวิต มอบเป็นราชพลี Body Heart Life given as Royal Sacrifice, เป็นนย. สักครั้งไซร้ จักฝังหฤทัยจนวายปราณ Being a Nor Yor (Marine) Once Will Be Remembered Until Death. (Once a Marine, Always a Marine).
- March: Royal Thai Marine Corps march
- Anniversaries: July 30

Commanders
- Commander- in-chief: Admiral Jirapol Wongwit
- Commander of the RTMC: Vice Admiral Apichart Sapprasert

Insignia
- Flag

The Royal Thai Marine Corps or RTMC (Thai: หน่วยบัญชาการนาวิกโยธิน) are the marines of the Royal Thai Navy (RTN). The Royal Thai Marine Corps was founded in 1932, when the first battalion was formed with the assistance of the United States Marine Corps (USMC). It was expanded to a regiment in 1940 and was in action against communist guerrillas throughout the 1950s and 1960s. During the 1960s the USMC assisted in its expansion into a brigade. The RTMC saw action on the Malaysian border in the 1970s, and has now been increased to four brigades.

== History ==
Historically, there was no distinction in the Kingdom of Siam between soldiers and marines, with the army performing both functions. The first "Thahan Ma-Rine", meaning "Marine Soldiers", were formed in 1833, during the reign of King Rama III. "Ma-Rine" was simply a transliteration of the English word. The development of the modern Thai Marine Corps can be divided into three periods:

=== Early years ===
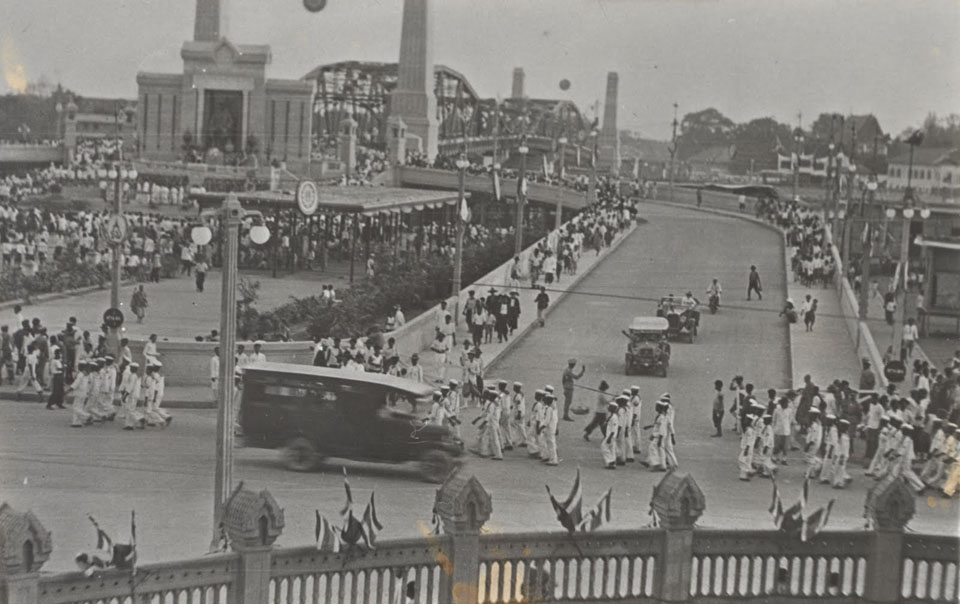
Sesquicentennial celebrations of The Revolution in 1932

The Marine Soldiers of the 19th and early 20th centuries were few in number and served mainly as a royal honor guard that provided security for the King whenever he traveled around the country.

On March 2, 1913, however, the Ministry of the Navy reorganized the Marine Soldiers. The Marine artillery platoon was attached to the Operation Command Department of Ships and Fortresses, while the Marine infantry platoon in Bangkok was attached to the Vehicle Division of the Department of the Navy Amphibious Assault Group.

The Revolution in 1932 transformed Thailand from an absolute monarchy to a constitutional monarchy. Shortly after, the Royal Thai Navy was reorganized, and the vehicle battalion became the Marine Corps Battalion of the Bangkok Navy Station. This is considered the first Marine Corps Battalion in Thailand.

=== Post–1932 Revolution (1932–1955) ===
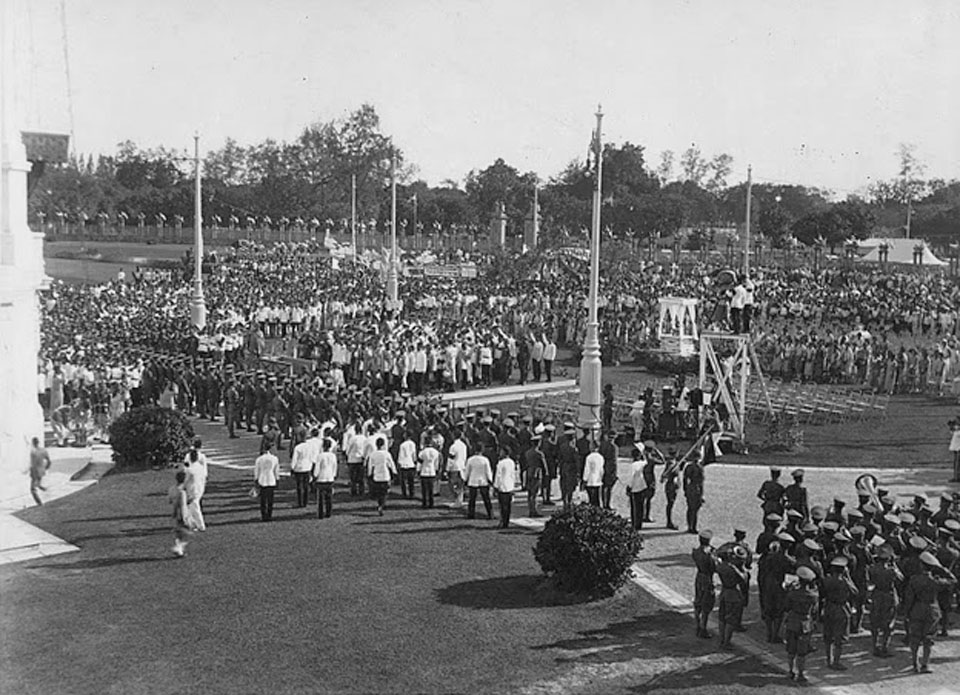
Sesquicentennial celebrations of The Revolution in 1932

The 2nd Marine Corps Battalion was established at Sattahip in 1937. Two years later, the 2nd Battalion was expanded into the Marine Corps Department. Shortly after that, a border dispute with French Indochina turned violent, and the Marine Corps Department's "Chanthaburi Division" was engaged in action with the French Foreign Legion (FFL) several times. During World War II, the Marine Corps sent troops to defend the southern border with British Malaya and also guarded Phuket Province from possible attack.

After Empire of Japan's surrender in September 1945, Thai marines helped disarm the Imperial Japanese Army (IJA) at Baan Pong District in Ratchaburi Province. In 1950, when communist violence in British Malaya spilled over into Thailand, Marine Corps Troop 6 was sent to help restore the peace in Narathiwat Province.

On June 29, 1951, the Thai government disbanded the Marine Corps Bureau, and Marine units were placed under the command the Army. This was in response to the Manhattan Rebellion in which part of the Navy (including Marines) rebelled against the ruling Army junta. However, this was during the Korean War, and both the United States Armed Forces and the Royal Thai Navy urged Thailand to reconsider.

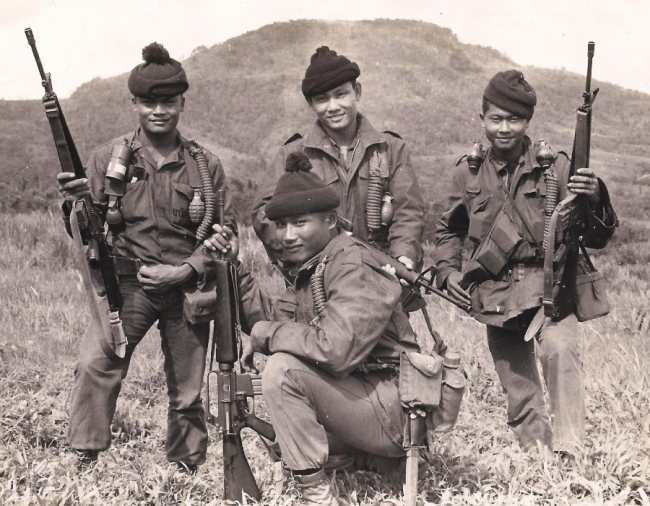
Thai marines group in Communist insurgency in Thailand

=== New Age (1955–present) ===
Four years later, the Thai Government acknowledged that a Marine Corps could perform a useful role in national defense. On July 30, 1955, the government created the Marine Corps Department. In 1961, tensions flared over the disputed temple of Preah Vihear, situated on the Thai side of a high cliff on the Cambodian border but shown on French maps as being in Cambodia. The Chanthaburi and Trat borders with Cambodia gave the Marine Corps Department its first assignment, safeguarding the coastline and southeastern border. Since 1970 the Marine Corps' Chanthaburi-Trat Task Force has been officially assigned the defense of this area.

During 1972 and 1973, Thai marines were involved in the "Operation Sam-Chai" anti-communist operations in Phetchabun Province and the "Pha-Phum" anti-communist operations in Chiang Rai Province. In 1973 and 1974, they took part in anti-communist operations in the southern provinces of Narathiwat, Pattani, and Yala.

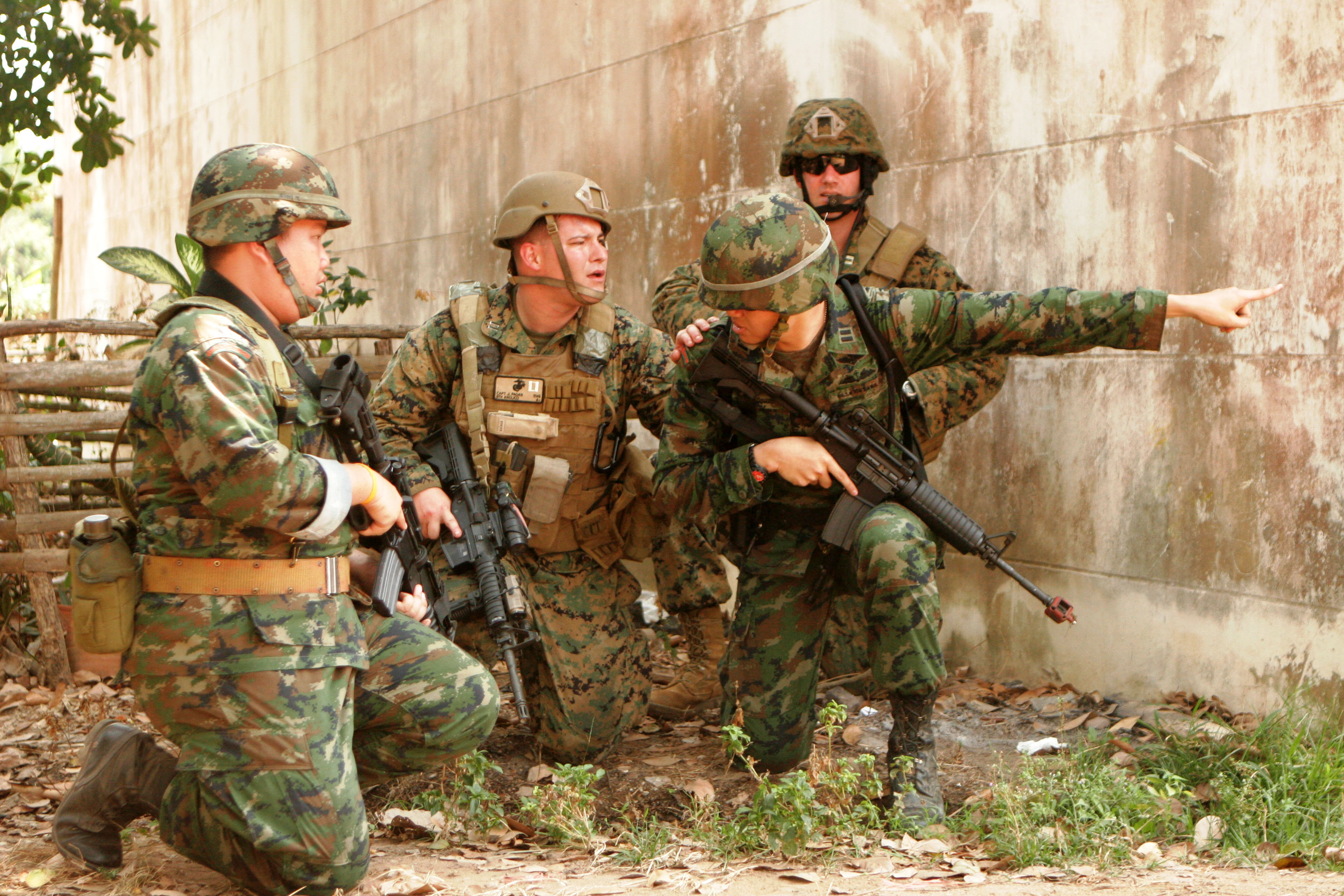
Royal Thai and US Marines eliminating hostile forces during a mock raid, 11 February 2011

Since 1975, RTMC have been assigned to Narathiwat as Reconnaissance Battalion (RECON). In 1977, they captured the communist camp at Krung-Ching in Nakhon Si Thammarat Province, and remaining there until 1981.

RTMC today are responsible for border security in Chanthaburi and Trat provinces. They have fought communist insurgents in engagements at Baan Hard Lek, Baan Koat Sai, Baan Nhong Kok, Baan Kradook Chang, Baan Chumrark, and in the battle of Hard Don Nai in Nakhon Phanom Province.

Since 1982, RTMC has been training with international marines, especially the United States Marine Corps, under the codename Cobra Gold (CG), which allows RTMC to gain many experience in new strategies and tactics to adapt to the current military situation. Meanwhile, marines from other nations participating in the training will gain experience in combat tactics and survival in the tropical rain forest.

At present, since 2004, Many Thai marines have died serving their country, and they continue to do so today, especially in the southern border provinces currently affected by the South Thailand insurgency, although they are trained more intensively in anti-irregular forces and counterinsurgency in urban areas. In real situations, Thai marines will be more flexible in their tactics according to the situation to minimize losses. Despite suffering significant casualties and losses, the Thai marines performed well especially in the difficult to reach drainage basin and jungle zone.

One of the Thai marines' most famous works during the South Thailand insurgency is Battle of Bacho. Despite being outnumbered and surrounded by superior Runda Kumpulan Kecil (RKK) insurgent forces, the Thai marines planned well to win the battle with no casualties. On the RKK side, a total of sixteen soldiers were killed during the attack on the 2nd Rifle Company Base, 32nd Task Force Narathiwat. This Battle of Bacho is considered the largest clash in which the death toll was from a group of insurgents who were fully armed.

A monument to their valor stands at the Royal Thai Navy base (aka Sattahip Naval Base) at Sattahip district, Chonburi province.

== United Nations Peacekeeping Operations ==
- United Nations Iraq–Kuwait Observation Mission
  - 1 Combat Engineer Company in Iraq
- United Nations Operation in Burundi
  - 1 Combat Engineer Company in Burundi
- (Sudan) United Nations–African Union Mission in Darfur
- United Nations Mission in Sudan
  - 1 Force Reconnaissance Company in Sudan
  - 1 Armored Company in Sudan

== Organization ==
=== Royal Thai Marine Corps Headquarters ===
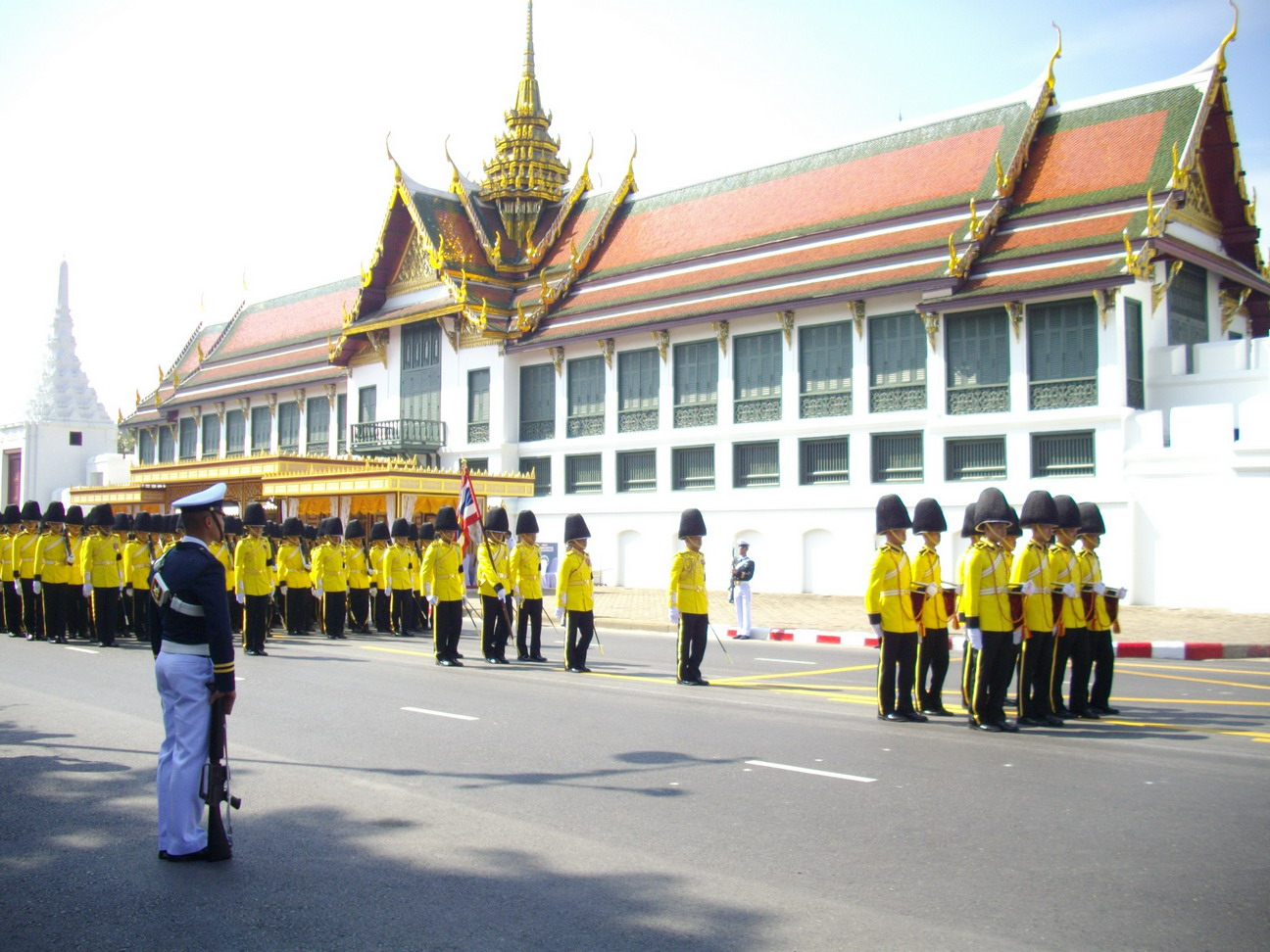
The 1st Marine Battalion, King's Guard

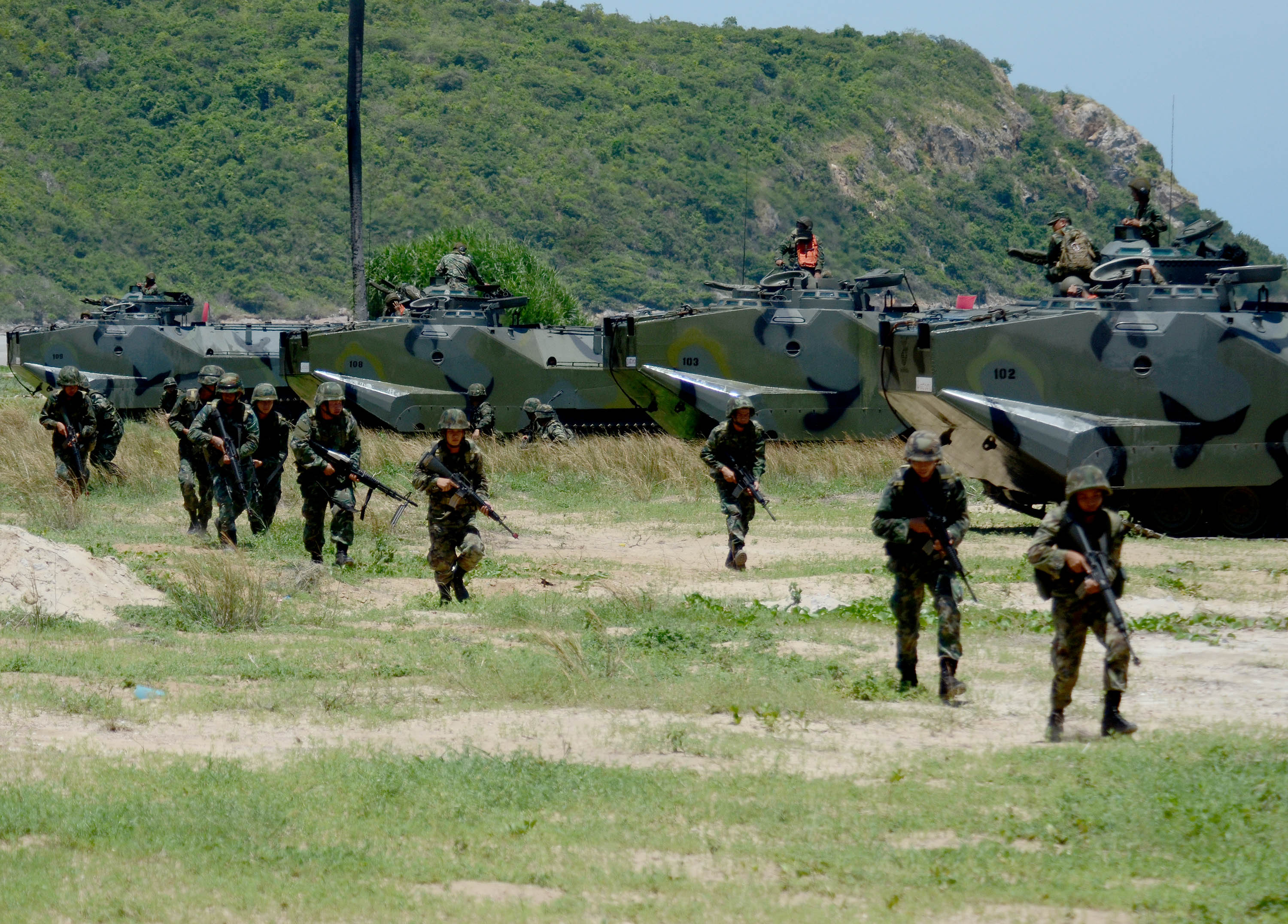
Royal Thai marines conduct amphibious assault at Hat Yao Beach in Thailand

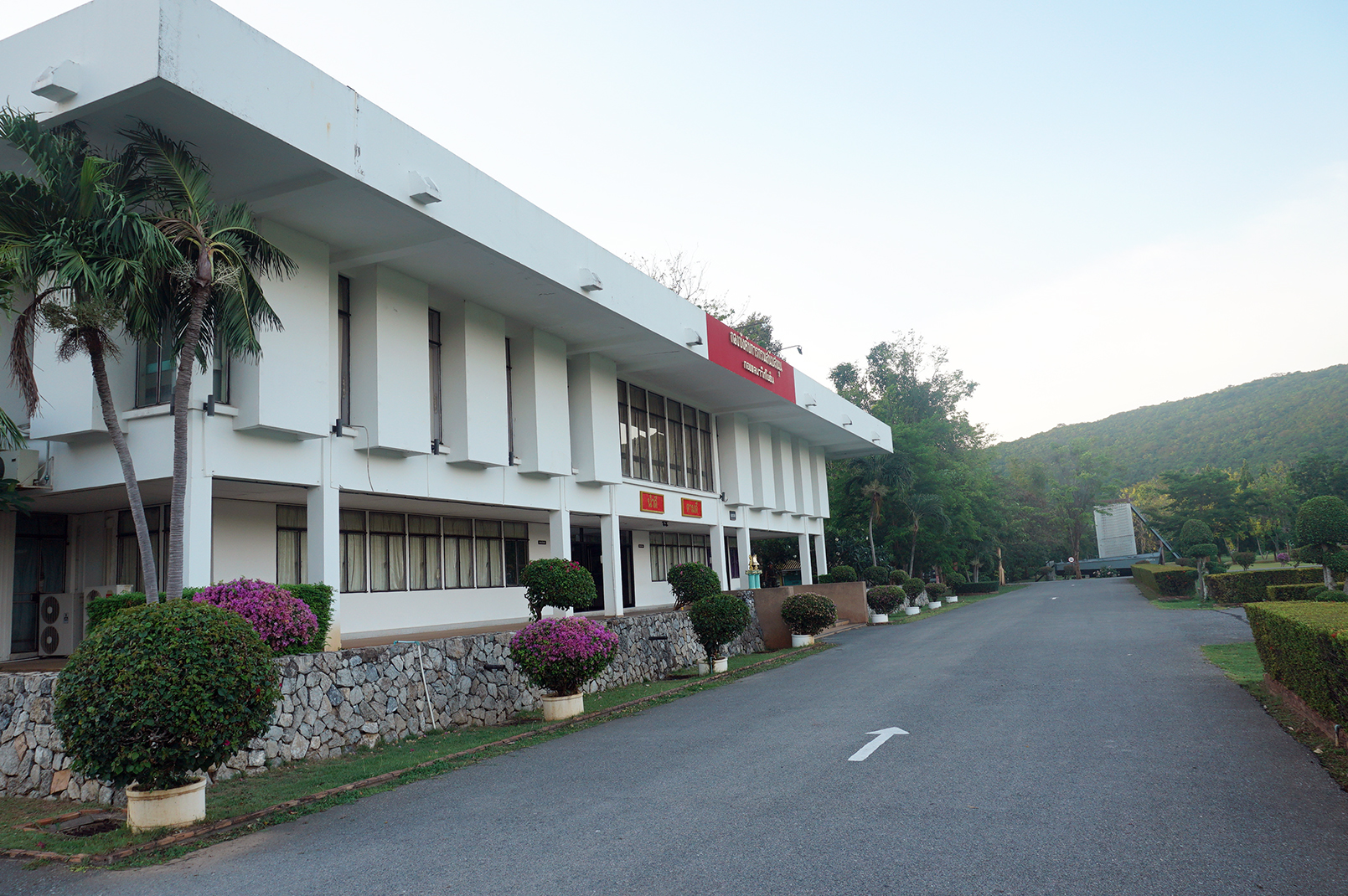
Marine Service Support Regiment

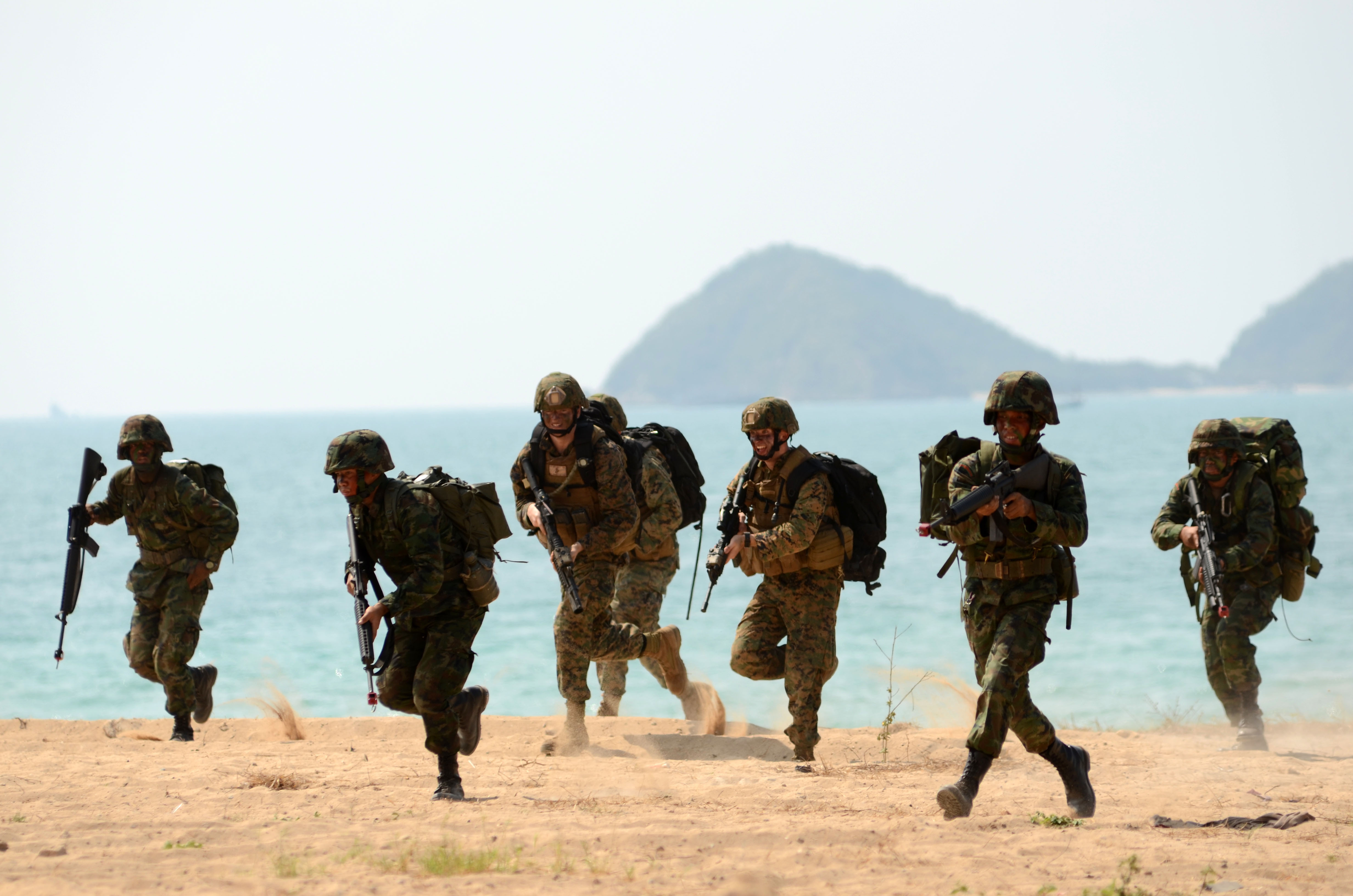
Royal Thailand Marines during Exercise Cobra Gold 2011

- Royal Thai Marine Corps Education Command
  - Marine Corps School
  - Recruit Training Division
  - Support Division
- RTMC: Marine Division
  - RTMC: 1st Marine Regiment
    - RTMC: 1st Infantry Battalion King's Guard
    - RTMC: 2nd Infantry Battalion
    - RTMC: 3rd Infantry Battalion
  - RTMC: 2nd Marine Regiment
    - RTMC: 4th Infantry Battalion
    - RTMC: 5th Infantry Battalion
    - RTMC: 6th Infantry Battalion
  - RTMC: 3rd Marine Regiment
    - RTMC: 7th Infantry Battalion
    - RTMC: 8th Infantry Battalion
    - RTMC: 9th Infantry Battalion King's Guard
  - RTMC: Marine Artillery Regiment
    - RTMC: 1st Artillery Battalion
    - RTMC: 2nd Artillery Battalion
    - RTMC: Air Defense Artillery Battalion
    - RTMC: 4th Artillery Battalion
  - RTMC: Marine Service Support Regiment
    - RTMC: Medical Battalion
    - RTMC: Dental Battalion
    - RTMC: Maintenance Battalion
    - RTMC: Transport Battalion
    - RTMC: Marine Assault Amphibious Vehicle Support Company
    - RTMC: Marine Band Platoon
  - RTMC Reconnaissance Battalion also known as (Force Recon/Marine Special Operations Force/RECON)
  - RTMC: Marine Assault Amphibian Vehicle Battalion: equipped with AAV-7A1 and BTR-3E1
  - RTMC: Marine Tank Battalion: equipped with Type 69-ll MBT
    - RTMC: Anti-Tank Company
  - RTMC: Marine Combat Engineer Battalion:
  - RTMC: Marine Signals Battalion
  - RTMC: Marine Military Police Company
- RTMC: Marine Security Regiment
- RTMC: Marine Psychological Operations Company
- RTMC: Marine Task Forces
  - RTMC: Marine 61st Special Operations Center
  - RTMC: Marines Task Unit 411
  - RTMC: Paramilitary Marine Regiment

== Miscellaneous ==
- The Royal Thai Marine Corps uses the Subskimmer

== Equipment ==
=== Infantry Equipment ===
Name	Origin	Image	Notes
Combat Helmet
M1	United States		Limited use, for ceremonial & training purpose only.
PASGT	United States		Standard issue.
MICH	United States		Large amount, some unit in Special Force and Recon widely use.
Load-bearing vest, Bulletproof vest
ALICE equipment	United States		Large amount, widely used.
CIRAS	United States		Used by Recon.
Combat Uniform
ERDL	United States		
ERDL	Thailand		Thailand version also in use, replaced.
Digital Woodland	Thailand		Standard issue.

=== Small arms ===
Name	Origin	Type	Caliber	Notes
Pistol
M1911	United States; Thailand	Semi-automatic pistol	.45 ACP	
Star Bonifacio Echeverria	Spain; Thailand	Semi-automatic pistol	.45 ACP	Royal Thai Army Ordnance Department Star Bonifacio Echeverria model M mod.
Colt Commander	United States	Semi-automatic pistol	.45 ACP.38 ACP	Colt Combat Commander.
Smith & Wesson Centennial	United States	Revolver	.38 ACP	
Star Bonifacio Echeverria	Spain	Semi-automatic pistol	.38 ACP	model M mod.
Carl Walther PPK	Germany	Semi-automatic pistol	.38 ACP 9×19mm Parabellum	
Browning Hi-Power	Belgium	Semi-automatic pistol	9×19mm Parabellum	Fabrique Nationale Browning High Power.
Assault rifle
M16A1/A2/A3	United States; Thailand	Assault rifle	5.56×45mm NATO	
M4A1/A3	United States	Assault rifle	5.56×45mm NATO	
Bushmaster M4	United States	Carbine	5.56×45mm NATO	
Colt AR-15	United States	Carbine	5.56×45mm NATO	
IWI Tavor	Israel	Assault rifle	5.56×45mm NATO	IWI TAVOR TAR-21
IWI X95	Israel	Assault rifle	5.56×45mm NATO	
Heckler & Koch G36	Germany	Assault rifle	5.56×45mm NATO	Used by recon.
Heckler & Koch HK416	Germany	Assault rifle	5.56×45mm NATO	Used by recon.
FN SCAR	Belgium	Automatic rifle	5.56×45mm NATO	Used by recon.
CQ M-311	China	Assault rifle	5.56×45mm NATO	
Shotguns
Remington Model 870	United States	Pump action Shotgun	12 gauge	
Remington Model 1100	United States	Semi-automatic shotgun	12 gauge	
Sniper rifle
Sako Defence Tikka	Finland	Sniper rifle	5.56×45mm.338 Lapua	
Machine guns
Madsen M-50	Denmark	Submachine gun	9×19mm Parabellum	
Micro Uzi	Israel	Submachine gun	9×19mm Parabellum	Micro Uzi
M249	United States	Light machine gun	5.56×45mm	
M60	United States	General-purpose machine gun	7.62×51mm	
M2 Browning	United States	Heavy machine gun	12.7×99mm	

=== Rocket, grenade and MANPAD ===
Name	Origin	Type	Notes
Rocket, grenade and MANPAD
M203	United States	Grenade launcher	
Armbrust	Germany	Anti-tank weapon	
M47 Dragon	United States	Anti-tank guided missile	
BGM-71 TOW	United States	Anti-tank guided missile	Use in Humvee.
M40A2	United States	Recoilless rifle	
QW-18	China	MANPAD	

=== Combat vehicles ===
Name	Origin	Type	Quantity	Notes
Combat vehicles
VN-16	China	Amphibious Infantry Fighting Vehicle	3 (+3)	3 ordered in June 2020 at approximate cost of US$13 million for the Royal Thai Marine Corps and delivered in May 2021. 6 plan
AAV-7A1	United States	Amphibious Infantry Fighting Vehicle	12	Variants include: AAVP-7A1, AAVC-7A1, AAVR-7A1. Upgraded locally by Chaiseri to match with the BAE Systems's AAV7A1 RAM/RS standard.
AWAV 8x8	Thailand	Amphibious Infantry Fighting Vehicle	7+(7+7)	8x8 manufactured by Chaiseri, it mounts a RCWS EM&E Guardian 1.5 (12.7mm) The Royal Thai Marine Corps purchased additional armor from Chaiseri Metal and Rubber Co., Ltd., at a price of 503,080,000 baht. Announced in 2026 (B.E. 2569).
R600	Thailand	Amphibious Infantry Fighting Vehicle	2	8x8
Sea Tiger AAPC	Thailand	Amphibious Infantry Fighting Vehicle	1	8x8
BTR-3E1	Ukraine	Armoured personnel carrier	12	8x8
HMV-150 Commando	United States	Armoured personnel carrier	24	HMV-150 has an 8.9 liters Cummins ISL engine with a new automatic transmission Allison 4500 with six gears, which were upgraded done by Panus Assembly.
First Win	Thailand	Armoured personnel carrier	8	4x4
Phantom 380-X	Thailand	Armoured personnel carrier	2	4x4

=== Logistic vehicles ===
Name	Origin	Type	Notes
Logistic vehicles
Humvee	United States	Military light utility vehicle	RTMC use M998, M1097A2, M997, M1025, M1045A2, M966.
M151	United States	Military light utility vehicle	RTMC use M151A2, M151A2 mounting TOW, M718A1, M825.
Ford Ranger	United States; Thailand	Pickup truck	
Isuzu Forward	Japan; Thailand	Truck	RTMC use SBR, TXD 4x2, TSD 4x4, TWD 6x6, HTW, FTR 4x4.
M35 2-1/2 ton cargo truck	United States	Military truck	RTMC use M35A2, M50A2, M49A2, M109A2.
M813	United States	Military truck	RTMC use M54A2, M543A2.

=== Field artillery ===
Name	Origin	Type	Quantity	Notes
Howitzer
M758 ATMG (variant of the ATMOS 2000)	Israel; Thailand	155mm Self-propelled howitzer	12	
GC-45 howitzer	Austria	155mm towed howitzer	18	
M101A1 mod	United States	105 mm towed howitzer	6	Improve the Nexter LG1 caliber.
M101A1	United States	105 mm towed howitzer	30	
GIAT LG1	France	105 mm towed howitzer	15	
Mortar
M120 mortar	Israel	120 mm Mortar	Unknown	
M29A1 mortar	United States	81 mm Mortar	Unknown	
M19 mortar	United States	60 mm Mortar	Unknown	
M224 mortar	United States	60 mm Mortar	Unknown	
Counter-battery radar
ARTHUR	Sweden	Counter-battery radar	Unknown	

== Historical equipment ==
=== Armoured fighting vehicles ===
Name	Origin	Type	Quantity	Notes
LVT	United States	Amphibious landing craft	16
M3 Half-track	United States	Half-track armored personnel carrier	12+

=== Field artillery ===
Name	Origin	Type	Quantity	Notes
M1A1	United States	75mm Pack howitzer	16+

== Combat Engagements ==
- World War II
  - Franco-Thai War
  - Pacific War
- Cold War
  - Communist insurgency in Thailand
  - Communist insurgency in Malaysia
  - Third Indochina War
  - Cambodian–Vietnamese War
  - Vietnamese border raids in Thailand
  - Thai–Laotian Border War
- 1999 East Timorese crisis
  - International Force East Timor
- Global war on terrorism
- Southern Insurgency
  - Battle of Bacho (2013)
- United Nations peacekeeping
  - United Nations Iraq–Kuwait Observation Mission
  - United Nations Operation in Burundi
  - United Nations–African Union Mission in Darfur
  - United Nations Mission in Sudan
- Cambodia–Thailand border dispute
  - 2025 Cambodia–Thailand clashes

== In popular culture ==
- Mercury Man is a 2006 Thai superhero martial arts action film. It is directed by Bhandit Thongdee with martial arts choreography by Panna Rittikrai of Ong-Bak, Tom-Yum-Goong and Born to Fight. Thai marines is control Afghan terrorist group in movies.

== Rank structure ==
Personnel of the RTMC use the uniform, ranks and insignia used by the personnel of the Royal Thai Navy, but with exceptions, such as:

- Personnel of the RTMC wear combat helmets as part of their ceremonial uniforms instead of sailor caps or peaked caps (except officers who wear peaked caps)
- Usually, Marines wear naval style insignia on the chest marks in their combat uniforms
- Marines wear in semi-formal situations the Navy's khaki dress uniform

Equivalent NATO Code	OF-10	OF-9	OF-8	OF-7	OF-6	OF-5	OF-4	OF-3	OF-2	OF-1		Cadet Officer
Officer ranks
Officer ranks	จอมพลเรือ	พลเรือเอก	พลเรือโท	พลเรือตรี	พลเรือจัตวา^{1}	นาวาเอก	นาวาโท	นาวาตรี	เรือเอก	เรือโท	เรือตรี	นักเรียนนายเรือ
Officer ranks	Admiral of the Fleet	Admiral	Vice Admiral	Rear Admiral	Commodore or Rear Admiral (lower half)^{1}	Captain	Commander	Lieutenant Commander	Lieutenant	Lieutenant; Junior Grade	Sub Lieutenant	Midshipman
Officer ranks	^{1}Rank on paper, not actually used in the Royal Thai Navy.

Equivalent NATO Code	OR-9		OR-8	OR-7	OR-5	OR-4	OR-3	OR-1
Enlisted ranks								No insignia
Enlisted ranks	พันจ่าเอกพิเศษ	พันจ่าเอก	พันจ่าโท	พันจ่าตรี	จ่าเอก	จ่าโท	จ่าตรี	พลทหาร
Enlisted ranks	Master Chief Petty; Officer	Senior Chief Petty; Officer	Chief Petty; Officer	Petty Officer; 1st class	Petty Officer; 2nd Class	Petty Officer; 3rd Class	Seaman	Seaman apprentice

== See also ==
- Royal Thai Navy
- Air and Coastal Defence Command
- RTMC Reconnaissance Battalion
- Royal Thai Naval Air Division
