= Compositions by Bhumibol Adulyadej =

Bhumibol Adulyadej (1927–2016), the late King of Thailand, had written more than 49 songs. His music is known in Thai as Phleng Phra Ratcha Niphon (Thai: เพลงพระราชนิพนธ์; lit. "Royal Composition"). He was influenced by jazz, but also wrote music in other genre such as waltz, march, and classical music.

The late king also authored English lyrics to five of his songs: "Echo", "Still on My Mind", "Old-Fashioned Melody", "No Moon", and "Dream Island". They are commonly known as "The Five Love Songs" as they were dedicated to his wife Queen Sirikit.

== Royal Compositions ==
1. Candlelight Blues/แสงเทียน
2. Love at Sundown/ยามเย็น
3. Falling Rain/สายฝน
4. Near Dawn/ใกล้รุ่ง
5. H.M. Blues/ชะตาชีวิต
6. Never Mind the Hungry Men's Blues/ดวงใจกับความรัก
7. Royal Guards/ราชวัลลภ
8. Blue Day/อาทิตย์อับแสง
9. Dream of Love Dream of You/เทวาพาคู่ฝัน
10. Sweet Words/คำหวาน
11. Maha Chulalongkorn/มหาจุฬาลงกรณ์
12. Love Light in My Heart/แก้วตาขวัญใจ
13. New Year Greeting/พรปีใหม่
14. Love Over Again/รักคืนเรือน
15. Twilight/ยามค่ำ
16. Smiles/ยิ้มสู้
17. The Colours March/มาร์ชธงไชยเฉลิมพล
18. Royal Guards March/มาร์ชราชวัลลภ
19. I Never Dream/เมื่อโสมส่อง
20. Love in Spring/ลมหนาว
21. Friday Night Rag/ศุกร์สัญลักษณ์
22. Oh I Say
23. Can't You Ever See–
24. Lay Kram Goes Dixie
25. Lullaby/ค่ำแล้ว
26. I Think of You/สายลม
27. When/ไกลกังวล/เกิดเป็นไทยตายเพื่อไทย
28. Magic Beams/แสงเดือน
29. Somewhere Somehow/ฝัน/เพลินภูพิงค์
30. Royal Marines March/มาร์ชราชนาวิกโยธิน
31. A Love Story/ภิรมย์รัก
32. Nature Waltz
33. The Hunter
34. Kinari Waltz
35. Alexandra/แผ่นดินของเรา
36. Pra Maha Mongkon/พระมหามงคล
37. Thammasat/ธรรมศาสตร์
38. Still on My Mind/ในดวงใจนิรันดร์
39. Old Fashioned Melody/เตือนใจ
40. No Moon/ไร้จันทร์/ไร้เดือน
41. Dream Island/เกาะในฝัน
42. Echo/แว่ว
43. Kasetsart/เกษตรศาสตร์
44. The Ultimate Dream/ความฝันอันสูงสุด
45. Fight!/เราสู้
46. Infantry Regiment 21/เรา - เหล่าราบ 21
47. Blues for Uthit
48. Rak/รัก
49. Menu Kai/เมนูไข่

=== Marches ===
In 1952, King Bhumibol Adulyadej composed the "Royal Marines March" (Thai: มาร์ชราชนาวิกโยธิน), the official march of the Royal Thai Marine Corps. It was the 30th composition by the king. It was first performed on 7 June 1959, during the visit of the American 7th Fleet to Thailand.

== See also ==
- Music of Thailand
