= Marine Artillery Regiment (Thailand) =

Military unit

Marine Artillery Regiment. Royal Thai Marine Division. Royal Thai Marine Corps.
- กรมทหารปืนใหญ่ กองพลนาวิกโยธิน หน่วยบัญชาการนาวิกโยธิน
- Founded: 31 January 1965 – Present.
- Country: Thailand
- Branch: Royal Thai Navy
- Type: Marines
- Size: Regiment
- Part of: Royal Thai Marine Corps
- Garrison/HQ: RTMC headquarters, Sattahip, Chonburi, Thailand
- March: เพลงมาร์ชกรมทหารปืนใหญ่ กองพลนาวิกโยธิน (March Marine Artillery Regiment)
- Mascot: Black Elephant
- Anniversaries: 31 January 1965
- Engagements: Cold War; Communist insurgency in Thailand; Communist insurgency in Malaysia; Vietnamese border raids in Thailand; Global war on terrorism; Southern Insurgency
- Website: (in Thai)

The Artillery Regiment Marine Division (Thai: กรมทหารปืนใหญ่ กองพลนาวิกโยธิน หน่วยบัญชาการนาวิกโยธิน) are the marines artillery combat support of the Royal Thai Marine Corps and Royal Thai Navy. Military units are supplied troops to support the various branches of the Royal Thai Navy. Even though they are marine artillerymen, but they are trained in combat skills, such as amphibious warfare, jungle combat tactics, living off the jungle, and other skills related to self-defense on the battlefield if the fire base is attacked or attacked while moving. However, they are trained protecting equipment, facilities and operations from threats or hazards in order to preserve operational effectiveness. Marines Artillery Regiment is also one of the forces participating in the mission of the unrest in South Thailand insurgency.

== History ==
On 31 January 1965, Marines Artillery Battalion led forces armed with artillery and light trajectory curve departure from Sattahip, Chonburi to the landing craft mechanized (LCM) at Trat, and then landed on the beach at Khlong Yai District, Trat, to prevent encroachment on the sovereignty of Cambodia so this is a major event and the heroism of the first Marines Artillery role in national defense and established Marines Artillery Regiment until today.

In 2017, 2nd Artillery Battalion, Marines Artillery Regiment is one of the agencies participating in the mission of the unrest in South Thailand insurgency the amphibious landing at Khok Khian, Muang Narathiwat, Marathiwat with HTMS Angthong and HTMS Mankang for shifting troops for the missions in South Thailand insurgency.

== Organization ==
- RTMC: Marines Service Support Regiment
  - RTMC: 1st Artillery Battalion
  - RTMC: 2nd Artillery Battalion
  - RTMC: Air Defense Artillery Battalion
  - RTMC: 4th Artillery Battalion
  - RTMC: Artillery Battalion Chanthaburi and Trat defense

== Equipment ==
=== Field artillery ===
Name	Type	Quantity	Origin	Notes
GC-45 howitzer	155 mm towed howitzer	12	Austria
GHN-45 A1 APU howitzer	155 mm towed howitzer	6	Austria
M101A1 mod	105 mm towed howitzer	6	United States	Improve the Nexter LG1 caliber.
M101A1	105 mm towed howitzer	30	United States
M120 mortar	120 mm mortar	?	Israel
M29A1 mortar	81 mm mortar	?	United States
M19 mortar	60 mm mortar	?	United States
M224 mortar	60 mm mortar	?	United States
