= Marine Service Support Regiment (Thailand) =

Marine Service Support Regiment Royal Thai Marine Division Royal Thai Marine Corps
- กรมสนับสนุน กองพลนาวิกโยธิน หน่วยบัญชาการนาวิกโยธิน
- Founded: 10 August 1978 - Present
- Country: Thailand
- Branch: Royal Thai Marine Corps
- Type: Marines combat service support
- Size: Regiment; Four battalion One company One platoon
- Part of: Marine Division
- Garrison/HQ: RTMC headquarters, Sattahip, Chonburi, Thailand
- Nickname: นย. ("Nor Yor") Marines
- Mottos: ประโยชน์ ประสิทธิภาพ ประหยัด (ฺBenefit Performance Save)
- Mascot: Seagulls
- Anniversaries: August 10th
- Engagements: Cold War; Communist insurgency in Thailand; Communist insurgency in Malaysia; Third Indochina War; Cambodian–Vietnamese War; Vietnamese border raids in Thailand; Thai–Laotian Border War; Persian Gulf War; 1999 East Timorese crisis; International Force East Timor; Global war on terrorism; Southern Insurgency; United Nations peacekeeping; United Nations Iraq–Kuwait Observation Mission; United Nations Operation in Burundi; United Nations–African Union Mission in Darfur; United Nations Mission in Sudan; 2004 Indian Ocean earthquake and tsunami; 2010 floods in Thailand and north Malaysia; 2011 Thailand floods; 2011 Southern Thailand floods; 2013 Southeast Asian floods; 2017 Southern Thailand floods
- Website: (in Thai)

The Marine Service Support Regiment or MSSR (Thai: กรมสนับสนุน กองพลนาวิกโยธิน) are the marines combat support of the Royal Thai Marine Corps and Royal Thai Navy. Military units are supplied troops to support the various branches of the Royal Thai Navy. Marine Service Support Regiment is also one of the forces participating in the mission of the unrest in South Thailand insurgency.

== History ==
On 10 August 1978 Royal Thai Navy has been established Marine Support Regiment, Marine Regiment to support and combat service of Royal Thai Marine. In 1989 has been transformed into the "Marine Service Support Regiment, Marine Division".

In 2017 Medical Battalion, Marine Service Support Regiment is one of the agencies participating in the mission of the unrest in South Thailand insurgency.

In 2018 Transport Battalion and Marine Assault Amphibious Vehicle Support Company, Marine Service Support Regiment. The amphibious landing at Khok Khian, Muang Narathiwat, Marathiwat with HTMS Angthong and HTMS Mankang for shifting troops for the missions in South Thailand insurgency.

== Organization ==
- RTMC: Marine Service Support Regiment
  - RTMC: Medical Battalion
  - RTMC: Dental Battalion
  - RTMC: Maintenance Battalion
  - RTMC: Transport Battalion
  - RTMC: Marine Assault Amphibious Vehicle Support Company
  - RTMC: Marine Band Platoon

== Gallery ==
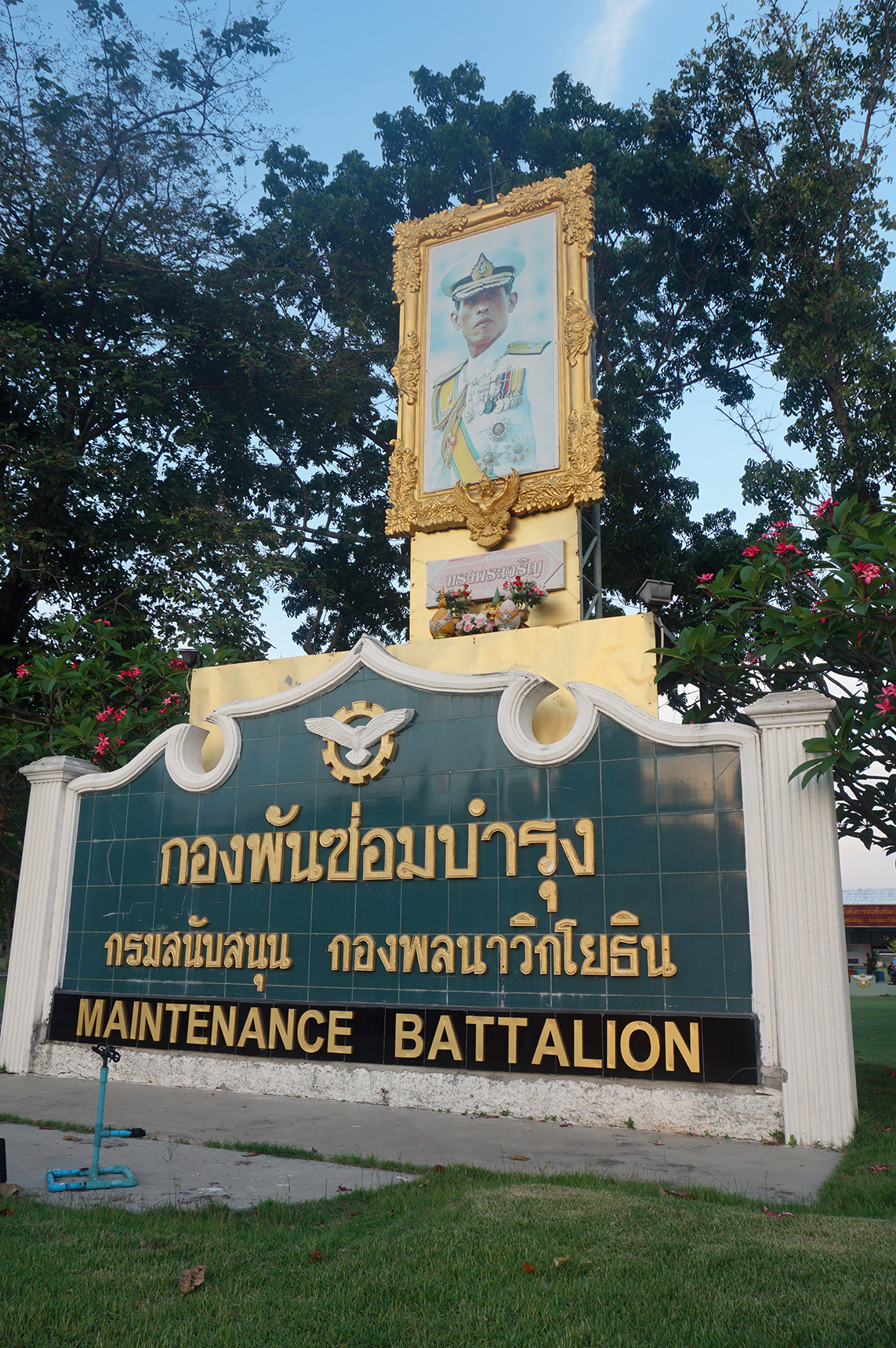

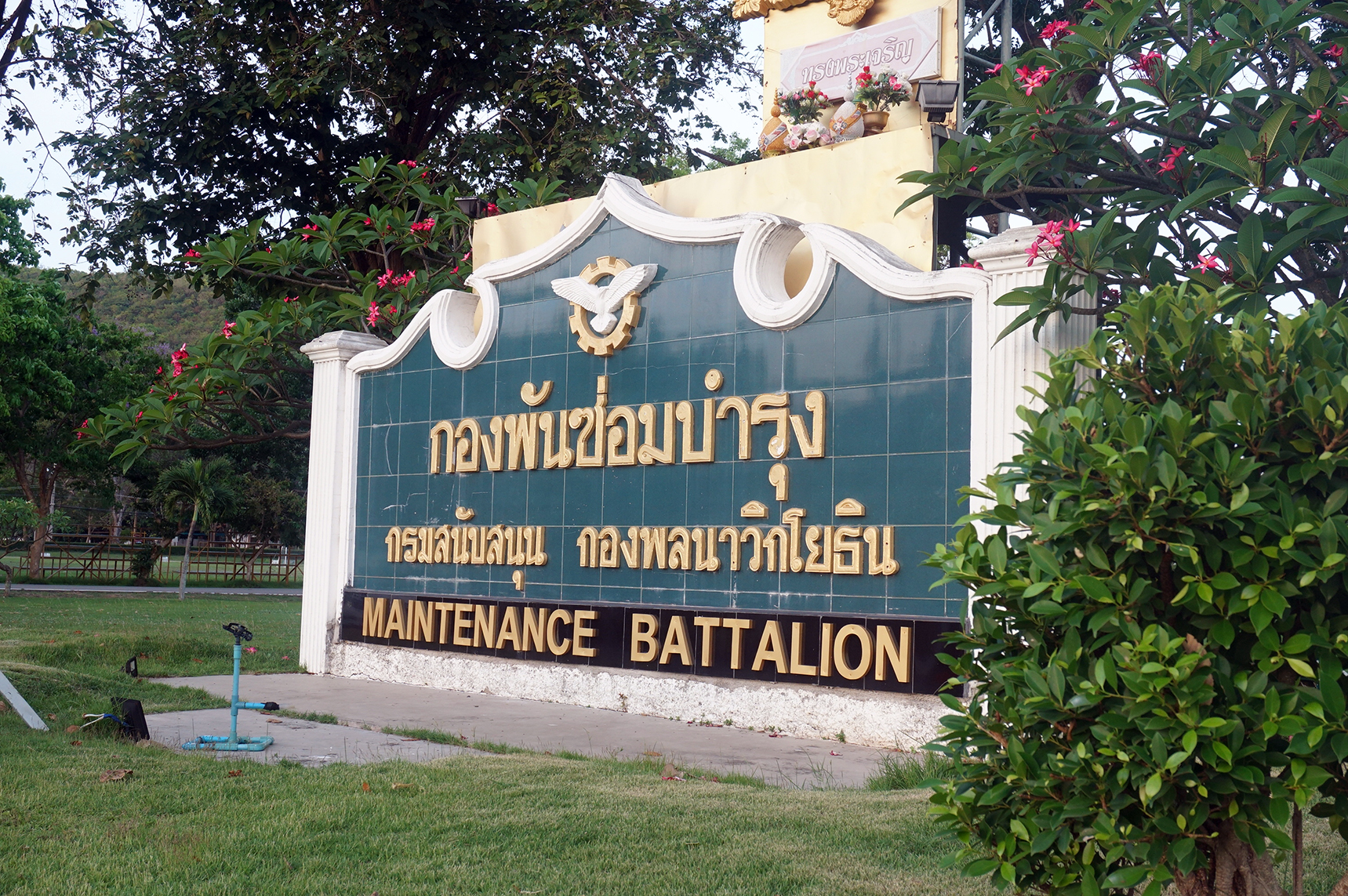

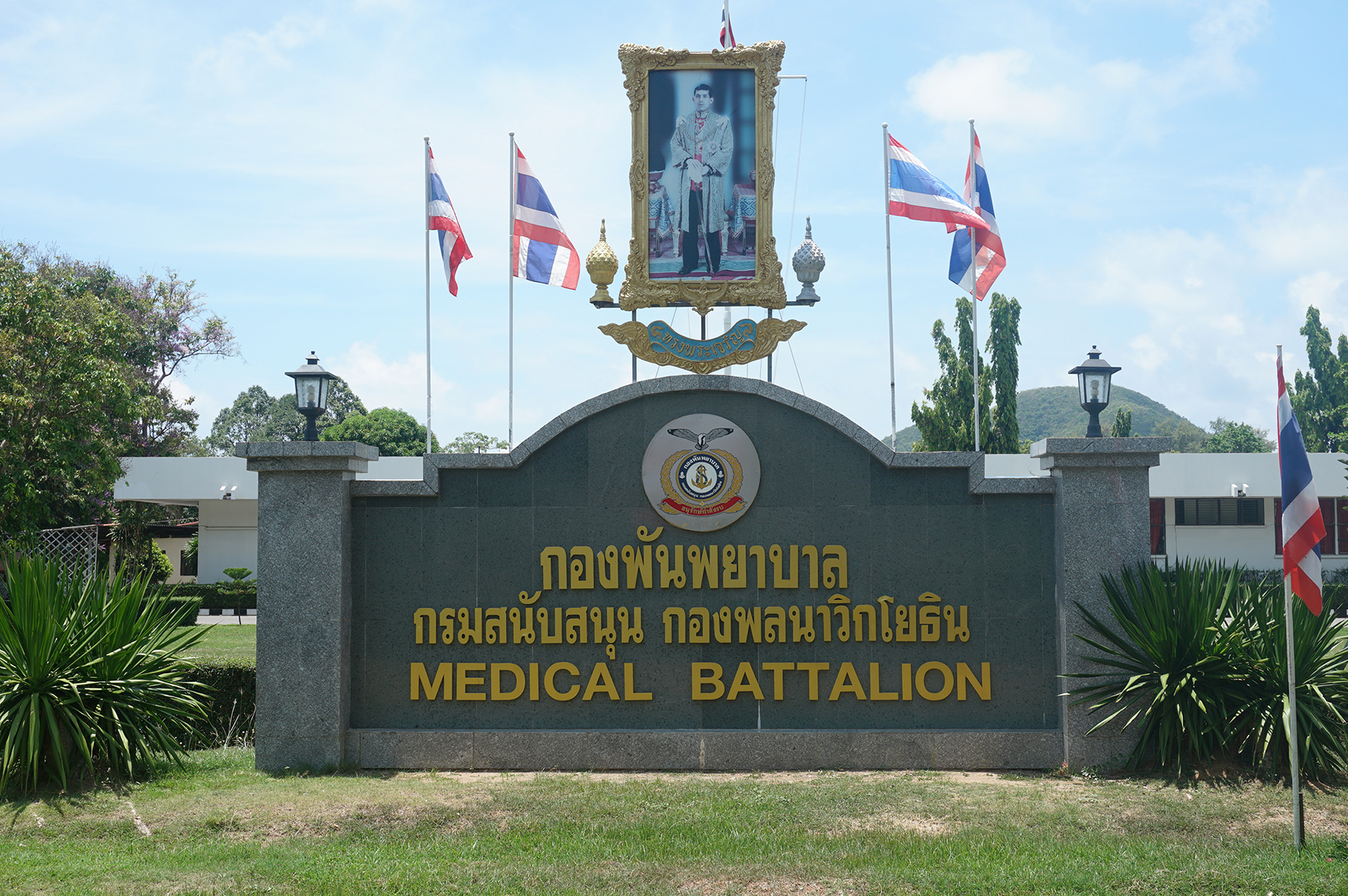

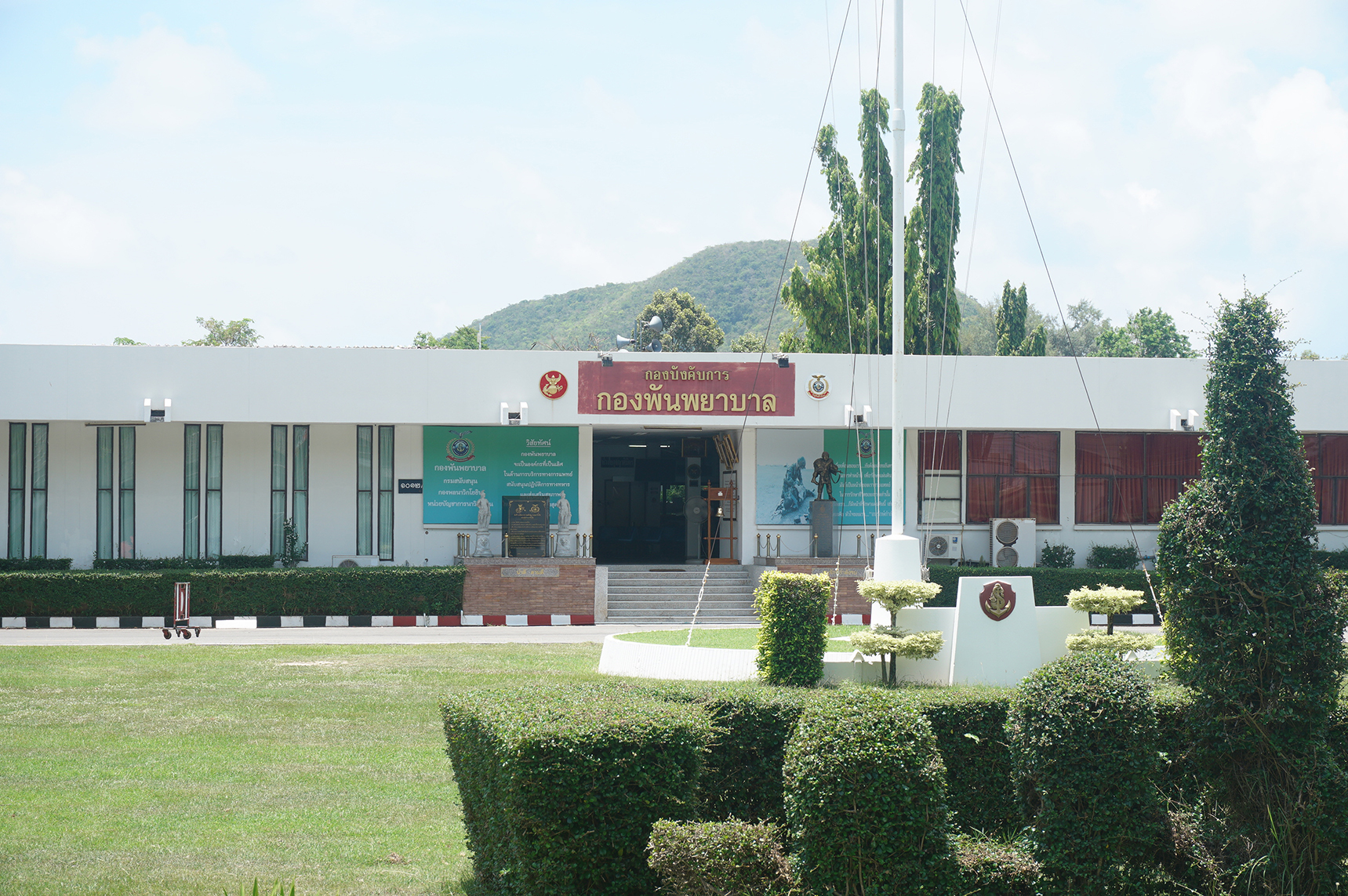

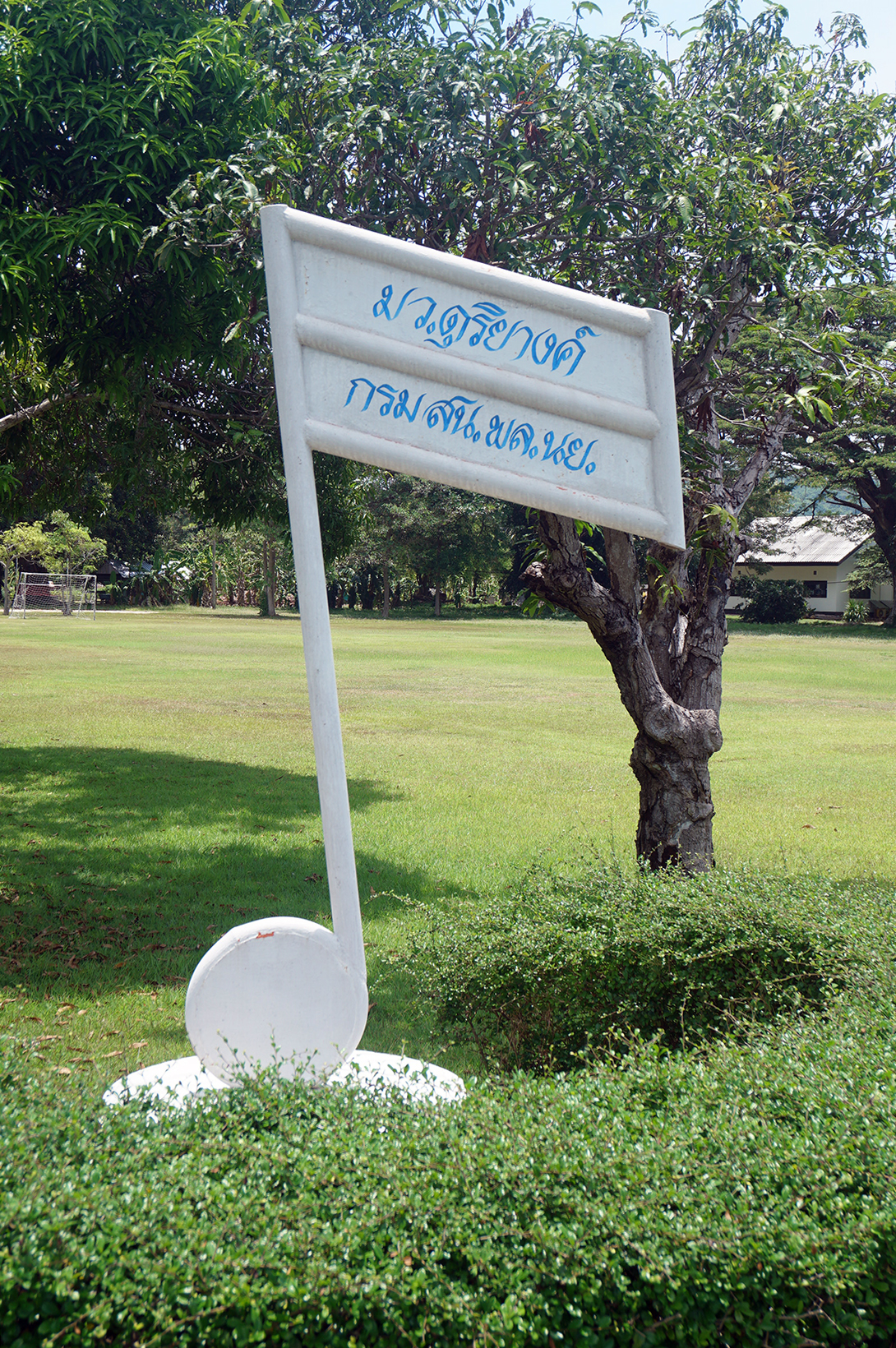

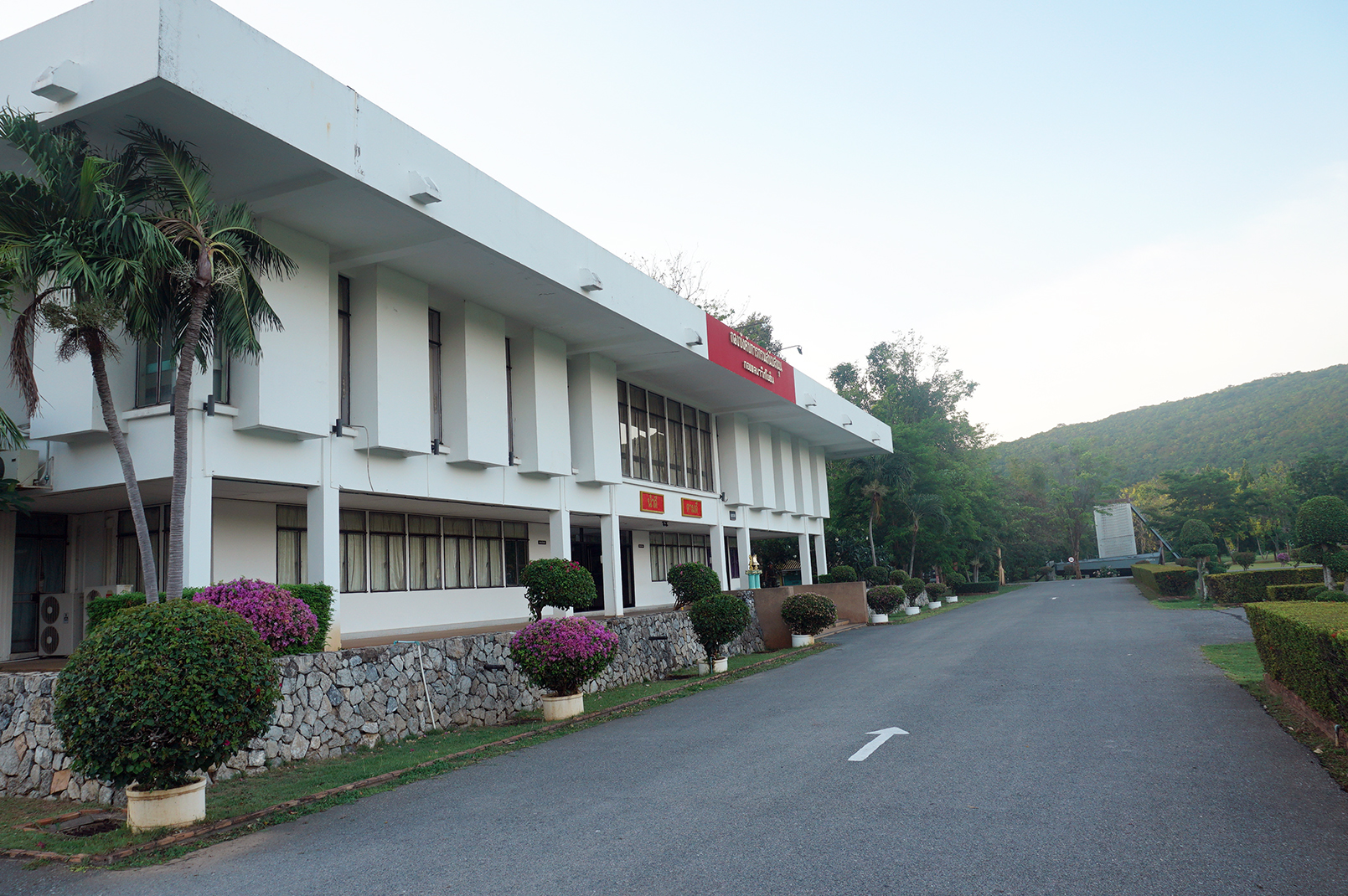

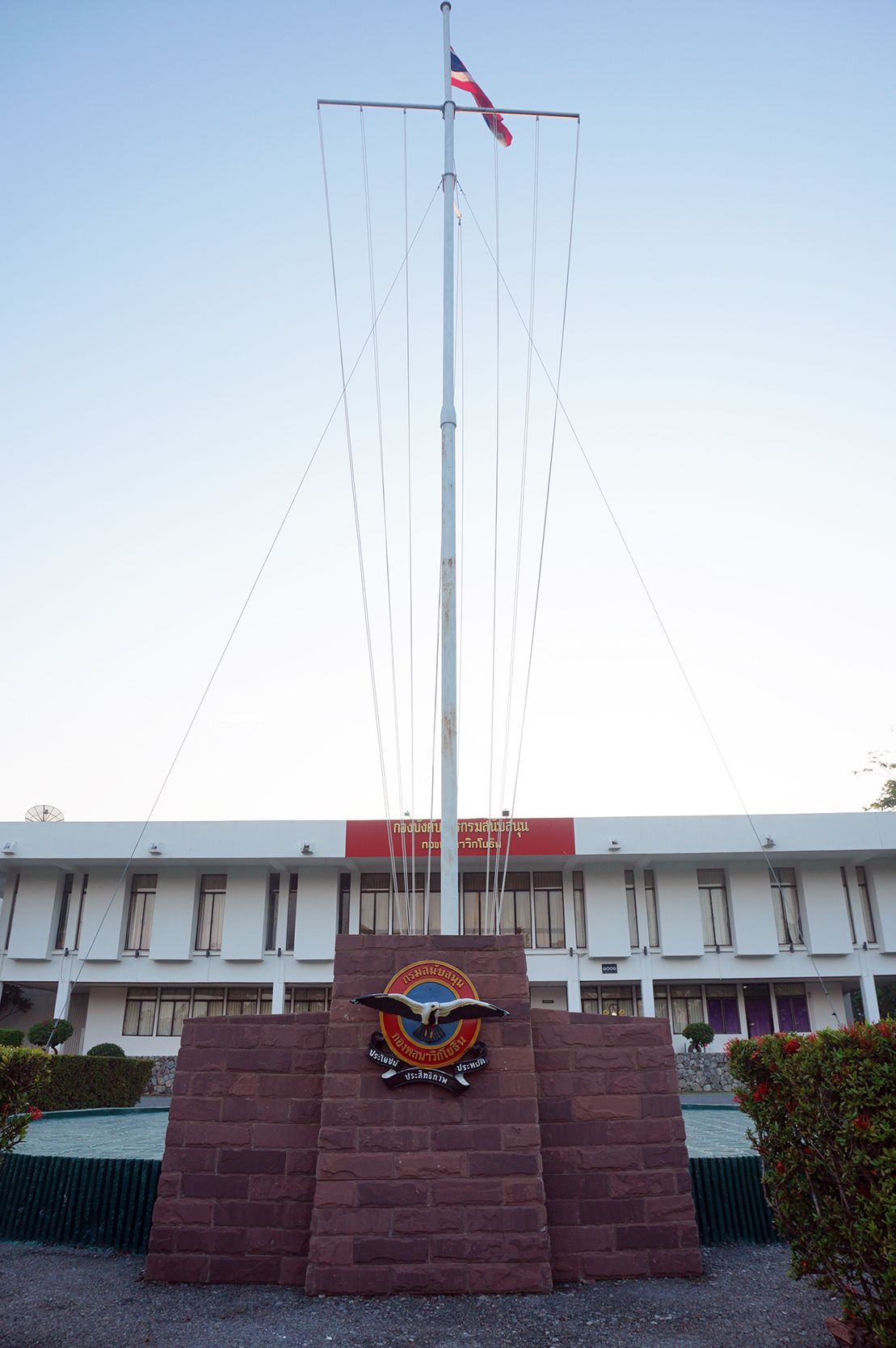

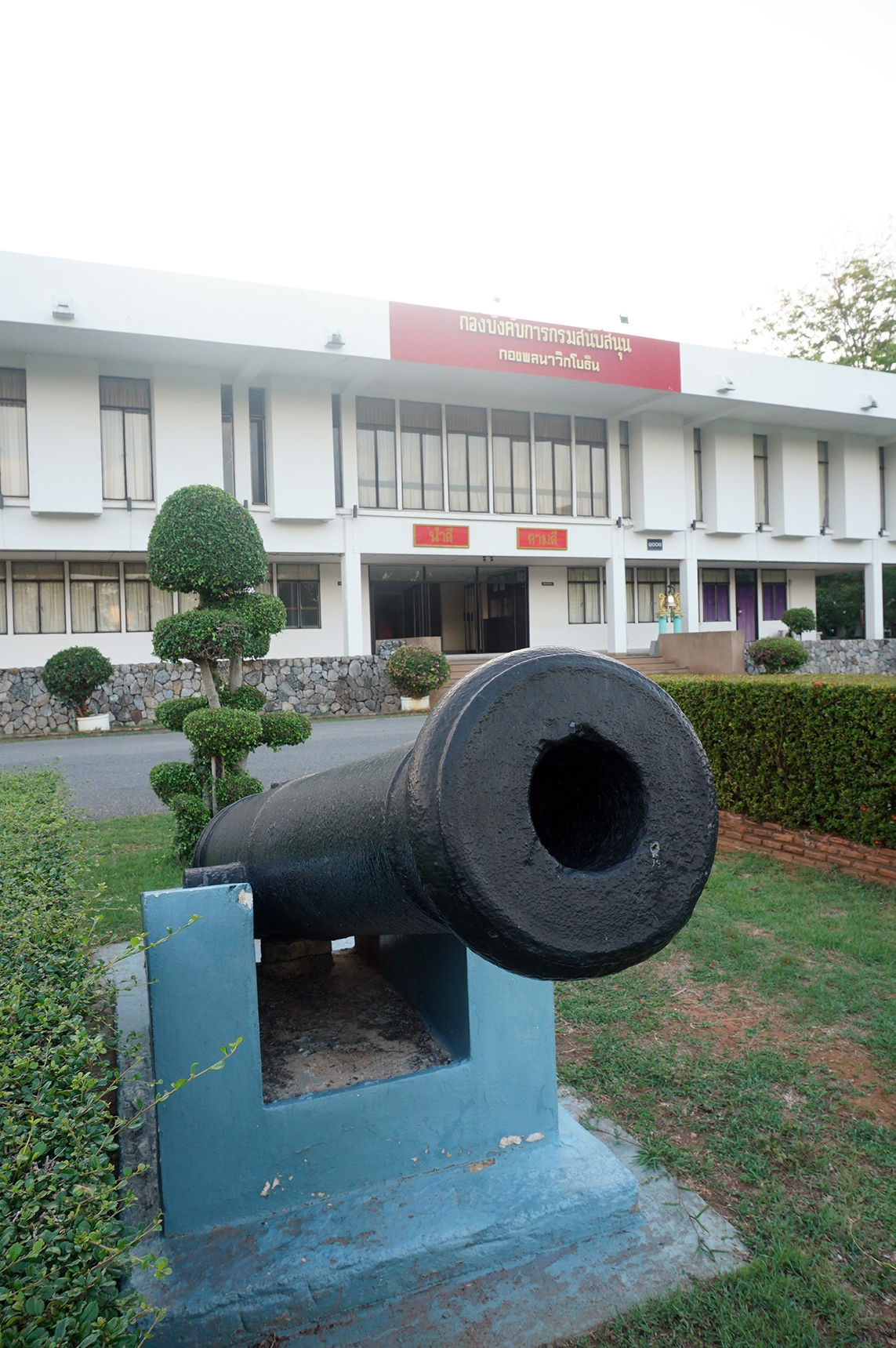

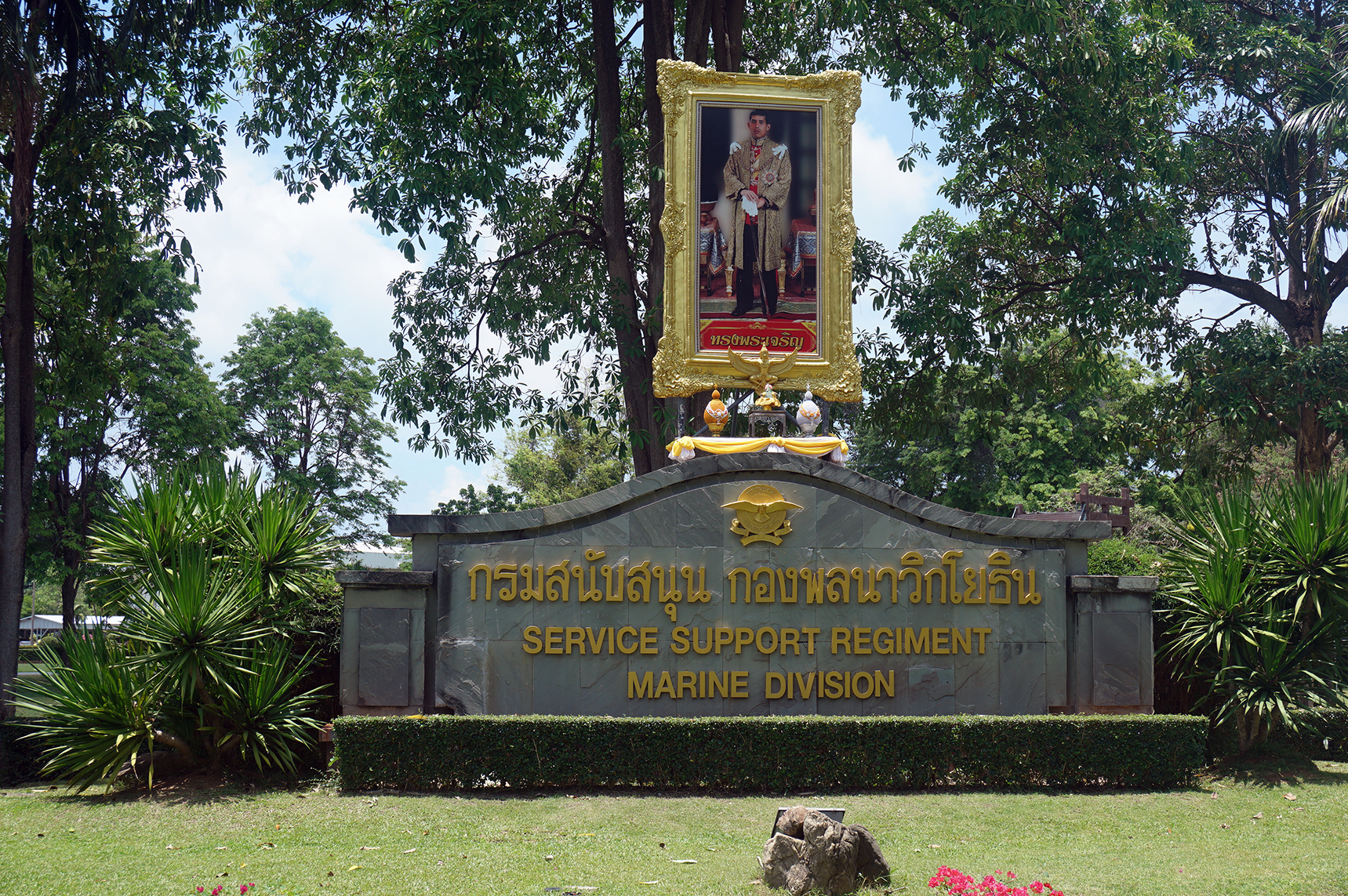
