= HXI =

HXI may refer to:

- Hard X-ray imager, instrument in the Advanced Space-based Solar Observatory
- HXI, division code for Huaxi District, China
- HXI, ARRL Radiogram handling instruction to deliver as a radiogram-ICS-213 message
- Yi Syllable HXI (ꉈ), one of the Yi Syllables
