= Kuafu project =

Chinese space project

The Kuafu project (simplified Chinese: 夸父计划; traditional Chinese: 夸父計劃; pinyin: Kuāfù Jìhuà) was a cancelled Chinese space project to establish a space weather forecasting system composed of three satellites, originally to be completed by 2012. As of the Solar Wind XIII conference in June 2012, the planned launch date was 2017. However, due to withdrawal first by Canada and then ESA, the project was postponed and effectively cancelled.

== Background ==
The project is named after Kuafu, a giant in Chinese mythology who chased the sun and died trying. One of these satellites would be placed at the Sun-Earth Lagrangian Point L1, while the other two would be placed in polar orbits. The later developed Chinese solar satellite series, the Advanced Space-based Solar Observatory (ASO-S) and the Solar Polar Orbit Observatory (SPO), although also unofficially known as Kuafu-1 (夸父一号) and Kuafu-2 (夸父二号), was unrelated to this project.

The project, also described as a Sino-Canadian-European space weather mission, was conceived as the first mission dedicated to studying space weather from its initiation at the Sun to the deposition of energy in the Earth's atmosphere. It was to consist of three spacecraft: KuaFu-A at the Sun–Earth L1 Lagrange point, and KuaFu-B1 and B2 in elliptical polar orbits around the Earth, with a phase difference equal to half an orbital period so that they could collect continuous images of the aurora and inner magnetosphere. KuaFu-A was meant to carry in situ instruments, including a magnetometer led by Imperial College London's Space and Atmospheric Physics group, that would measure particles and fields about an hour before they reached the Earth's magnetosphere.
