= Kuafu =

Character in Chinese mythology

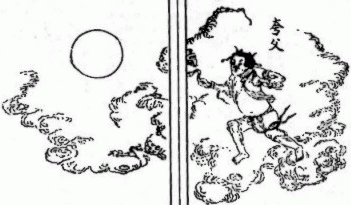
- Kuafu from a 17th-century print of the Shanhaijing, after original drawing by Hu Wenhuan.
- Chinese: 夸父
- Literal meaning: Handsome Father
Transcriptions
Standard Mandarin
- Hanyu Pinyin: Kuā Fù
- Wade–Giles: Kʻua^{1} Fu^{4}
- IPA: [kʰwá.fû]
Yue: Cantonese
- Jyutping: kwaa^{1} fu^{6}
Middle Chinese
- Middle Chinese: /kʰˠua bɨo^{X}/
Old Chinese
- Zhengzhang: /*kʰʷraː baʔ/

Illustration from the Complete Classics Collection of Ancient China (early 18th century)

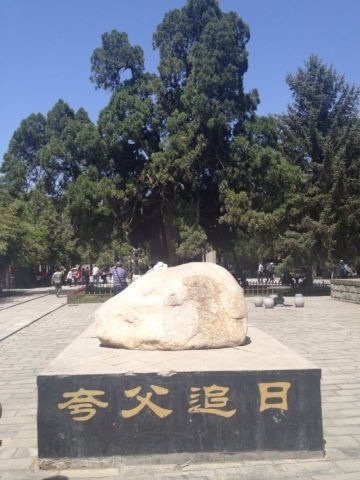
Stone carving at the Mausoleum of the First Qin Emperor, with inscription "Kua Fu Chases the Sun"

Kuafu (Chinese: 夸父) is a giant in Chinese mythology who wished to capture the Sun. He was a grandson of Houtu.

== Story ==
Kuafu is a giant. One day, Kuafu decided to chase and catch the Sun. He followed the Sun from the East to the West, draining the Yellow River and the Wei River (all rivers and lakes crossing his path) to quench his burning thirst. However, the big rivers were also unable to quench his thirst, and as he searched for more water, he eventually died of dehydration. The wooden club he was carrying grew into a vast forest of peach trees called the Deng Forest (鄧林).

In one version, Kuafu turns into a mountain range. This mountain range and the peach forest are said to be located in present day Lingbao.

In modern Chinese usage, the story of Kuafu chasing the Sun (夸父追日) is used to describe a person who is brave, overly optimistic, overestimating one's own abilities, and willing to overcome all the obstacles to reach the goal, but cannot achieve it.

== Tribe ==
"Kuafu" can also be taken to refer to his people, the Kuafu-shi (夸父氏) or "Clan of Kuafu". Since "shi" can mean both "clan" and "maiden name", as well as serving as a masculine honorific like "mister" or "sir", it is sometimes used in reference to his people or the individual.

During the battle of Banquan, Chi You's tribes allied themselves with the Kuafu tribe and the Sanmiao (三苗) tribe and attacked the Yan Emperor's tribe, driving them into the lands of the Yellow Emperor.

== See also ==
- Kuafu project, Chinese space program named after Kuafu
- Icarus, comparative character in Greek mythology
