= Solar Polar Orbit Observatory =

Planned Chinese solar orbiter

- Mission type: High-inclination solar orbiter
- Operator: Chinese Academy of Sciences (CAS)

Start of mission
- Launch date: 2029

The Solar Polar Orbit Observatory (SPO), nicknamed as Kuafu-2 (夸父二号) is a planned space probe aimed at studying the Sun at various latitudes. As the next mission after Advanced Space-based Solar Observatory (ASO-S), it will also be operated by the Chinese Academy of Sciences (CAS) as part of the Strategic Priority Program on Space Science (SPP) project led by National Space Science Center (NSSC) of CAS, a project under the National Space Science Medium- and Long-Term Development Plan, and aims to be the first heliocentric polar orbiter since NASA and ESA's Ulysses in 1990.

== Overview ==
Aiming to launch in 2029, the SPO's trajectory calls for the spacecraft to make a gravity assist of Earth in order to reach the orbit of Jupiter. There, it would flyby the planet to place it out of the ecliptic, and would subsequently make further assists off of Earth to lower its aphelion. Along the way, it would be making studies of the Sun's poles as it passed overhead.

The SPO is also slated to carry numerous instruments in order to capture the first imaging operations of the solar polar regions, as well as making a "cloud map" of interplanetary space around the Sun. Such instruments include an ultraviolet and x-ray telescope, several coronagraphs, and a radio spectrometer. Additionally, it plans on carrying a handful of ion analyzers as well as a magnetometer.

== See also ==
- Ulysses
- Solar Orbiter
- Advanced Space-based Solar Observatory
