= Advanced Space-based Solar Observatory =

Chinese satellite launched in 2022

ASO-S
- Mission type: Heliophysics
- Operator: CAS
- COSPAR ID: 2022-129A
- SATCAT no.: 54029
- Website: http://aso-s.pmo.ac.cn/en_index.jsp

Spacecraft properties
- Manufacturer: CAS
- Launch mass: 888 kg (1,958 lb)

Start of mission
- Launch date: 8 October 2022
- Rocket: CZ-2D
- Launch site: Jiuquan Satellite Launch Center

Orbital parameters
- Regime: Sun-synchronous orbit

The Advanced Space-based Solar Observatory, also known as ASO-S, and nicknamed as Kuafu-1 (夸父一号), is a satellite mission aimed at improving observations of solar activity.

== History ==
The satellite was launched using the CZ-2D rocket at 07:43:55 local time on October 9, 2022 (8 October 2022 at 23:43 UTC).

ASO-S was first proposed by the Chinese solar physics community in 2010 or 2011, and was formally approved by the Chinese Academy of Sciences in 2017. The mission is aimed at studying the Solar Magnetic Field, Coronal Mass Ejections and Solar flares.

The Chief Scientist is Weiqun Gan of the Purple Mountain Observatory, while the chief designer and the chief administrator are both associated with the National Space Science Center, which is part of the University of the Chinese Academy of Sciences.

The next mission is Solar Polar Orbit Observatory (SPO), nicknamed as Kuafu-2 (夸父二号). Both satellites are not part of the cancelled Kuafu project in 2010's.

== Instruments ==
- Full-Disc Vector Magnetograph (FMG); to observe the vector magnetic field of the sun's photosphere
- Hard X-ray imager (HXI); to observe non-thermal physical processes in solar flares
- The Lyman-alpha Solar Telescope (LST); to observe the formation and early evolution of coronal mass ejections
