= Yi Syllables =

- Range: U+A000..U+A48F (1,168 code points)
- Plane: BMP
- Scripts: Modern Yi syllabary
- Major alphabets: Nuosu (Yi)
- Assigned: 1,165 code points
- Unused: 3 reserved code points

Unicode version history
- 3.0 (1999): 1,165 (+1,165)

Unicode documentation
- Code chart ∣ Web page

Yi Syllables is a Unicode block containing the 1,165 characters (1,164 phonemic syllables plus 1 syllable iteration mark) of the Liangshan Standard Yi script for writing the Nuosu (or Northern Yi, Sichuan Yi) language.

== Syllables ==
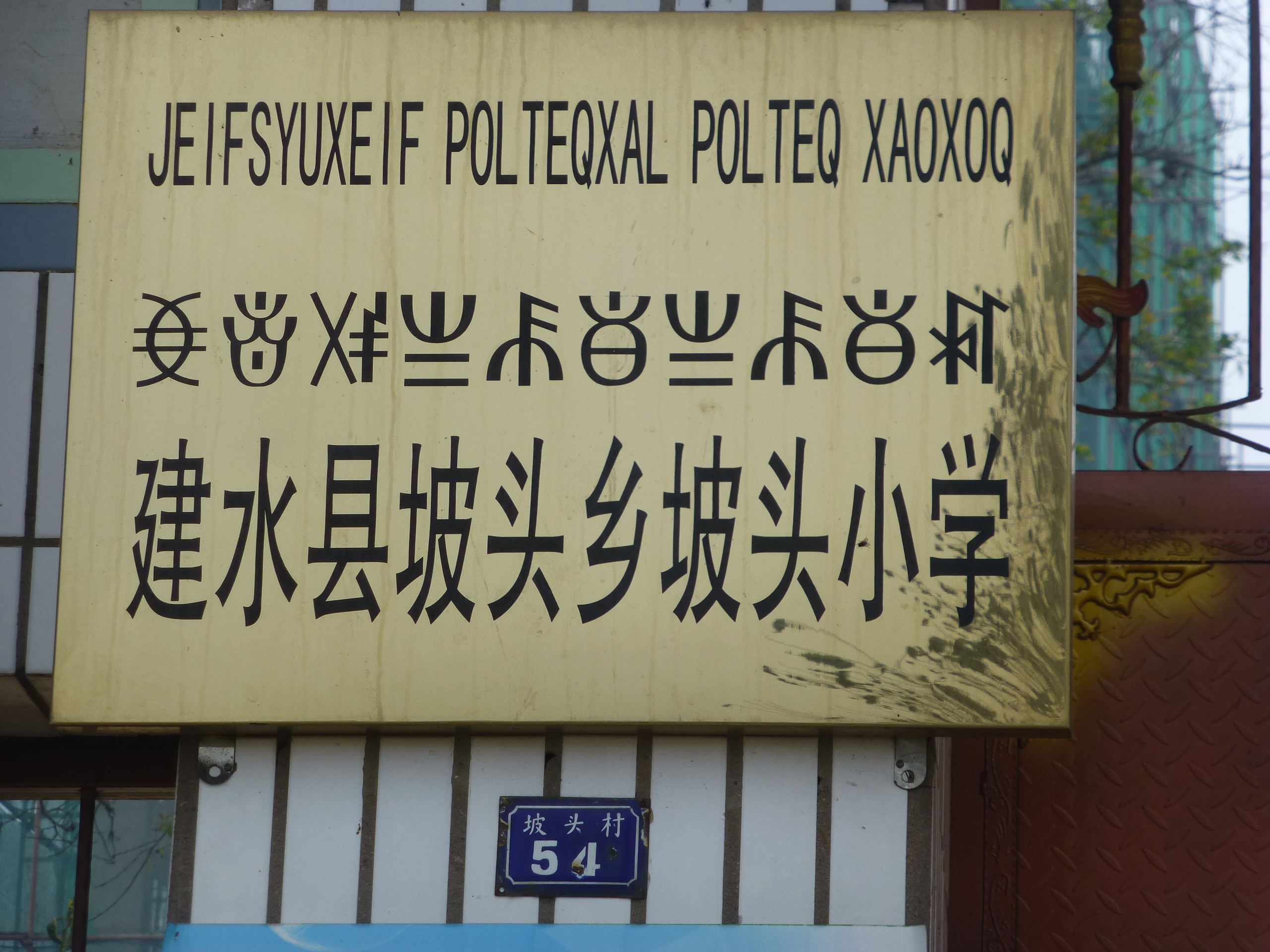
A sign in alphabetic Hani Pinyin (top), syllabic Yi (middle), and Chinese (bottom), on Potou Elementary School in Jianshui County, Yunnan. Note that the Yunnan Hani Pinyin romanization "JEIF·SYU·XEIF POL·TEQ·XAL POL·TEQ XAO·XOQ" shown at top for the Southern Yi (Hani) language used here in Yunnan province is different from the Sichuan Yi Pinyin romanization "JIEP·SHO·XIEP PO·TEP·XUO PO·TEP XUO·XOP" that would represent the text "ꏧꎴꑤ·ꁈꄯꑥ·ꁈꄯ·ꑥꑪ" written on the middle line with the syllabic Yi script, standardized for the Northern Yi (Nuosu) language spoken in Sichuan province. So the same modern Yi syllable "ꑦ", romanized distinctly either as "XAL" or "XAO" in the displayed Yunnan Hani Pinyin text, would be romanized only as "XUO" in standard Sichuan Yi Pinyin. This distinction is also kept and visible in the Chinese script displayed on the bottom line, which also distinguishes two syllables represented only as "ꄯ" in Syllabic Yi script, romanized as "TEQ" in Hani Pinyin or as "TEP" in Sichuan Yi Pinyin.

The Sichuan Yi Pinyin romanization shown below is simplified using only basic Latin letters, and pronunciations are accurate for the major Liangshan dialect of the Nuosu (Northern Yi) language spoken in the Sichuan Province, where the syllabary was first standardized in 1974, based on its dominant Liangshan dialect spoken in that province and for which an extensive dictionary was developed and published in 1980:

- the 43 initial consonants are noted with basic Latin consonants if possible, or distinctive consonant digraphs rather than with extended consonants (e.g. from IPA symbols or basic Latin consonants with diacritics);
- the 9 final vowels are noted with basic Latin vowels if possible, or distinctive vowel digraphs rather than with extended vowels (e.g. from IPA symbols or basic Latin with diacritics); the vowel length is not noted but is implied for compound vowels; the actual phonetic vowel (e.g. noted 'i' in Pinyin) may be very different depending on the initial consonant; some vowels are noted using a digraph with a final 'r';
- tones are noted after the final vowel by appending a 't' for the high tone, 'x' for the raising tone, 'p' for the low (or falling) tone, or their absence for the default mid tone (rather than with diacritics, digit-like modifier letters, or tone modifier marks); various Yi dialects spoken in China may use more than 4 tones for some syllables, but they are usually not semantically distinctive and unified using one of the 4 standardized tones (instead of the many existing variants or alternate logograms that were used in the Classical Yi logosyllabary). Another "Hani Pinyin" notation (also used in public displays, e.g. in the Yunnan Province for Southern Yi dialects) are noting tones with a trailing 'F', 'O', 'Q' or 'L', instead of 't', 'x' or 'p' in Yi Pinyin: this alternate Hani Pinyin system also represents consonants and vowels with different single letters or digraphs, but can distinguish more phonemic syllables than those unified in the current version of the modern Yi syllabary.
- Characters for the high tone (-t) are generally very different from those used for the low tone (-p), frequently based on a different radical. On the opposite, characters for the raising tone (-x) show an additional arc diacritic above the base character used for the similar syllable with the default mid tone, or above the character for the similar syllable with the low tone (-p) in 3 cases where there's no character for the mid tone in the standard syllabary.

Code	Character	Character name (formal alias)	Sichuan Yi Pinyin
U+A000	ꀀ	YI SYLLABLE IT	it
U+A001	ꀁ	YI SYLLABLE IX	ix
U+A002	ꀂ	YI SYLLABLE I	i
U+A003	ꀃ	YI SYLLABLE IP	ip
U+A004	ꀄ	YI SYLLABLE IET	iet
U+A005	ꀅ	YI SYLLABLE IEX	iex
U+A006	ꀆ	YI SYLLABLE IE	ie
U+A007	ꀇ	YI SYLLABLE IEP	iep
U+A008	ꀈ	YI SYLLABLE AT	at
U+A009	ꀉ	YI SYLLABLE AX	ax
U+A00A	ꀊ	YI SYLLABLE A	a
U+A00B	ꀋ	YI SYLLABLE AP	ap
U+A00C	ꀌ	YI SYLLABLE UOX	uox
U+A00D	ꀍ	YI SYLLABLE UO	uo
U+A00E	ꀎ	YI SYLLABLE UOP	uop
U+A00F	ꀏ	YI SYLLABLE OT	ot
U+A010	ꀐ	YI SYLLABLE OX	ox
U+A011	ꀑ	YI SYLLABLE O	o
U+A012	ꀒ	YI SYLLABLE OP	op
U+A013	ꀓ	YI SYLLABLE EX	ex
U+A014	ꀔ	YI SYLLABLE E	e
U+A015	ꀕ	YI SYLLABLE WU (YI SYLLABLE ITERATION MARK)	w (Iteration mark)
U+A016	ꀖ	YI SYLLABLE BIT	bit
U+A017	ꀗ	YI SYLLABLE BIX	bix
U+A018	ꀘ	YI SYLLABLE BI	bi
U+A019	ꀙ	YI SYLLABLE BIP	bip
U+A01A	ꀚ	YI SYLLABLE BIET	biet
U+A01B	ꀛ	YI SYLLABLE BIEX	biex
U+A01C	ꀜ	YI SYLLABLE BIE	bie
U+A01D	ꀝ	YI SYLLABLE BIEP	biep
U+A01E	ꀞ	YI SYLLABLE BAT	bat
U+A01F	ꀟ	YI SYLLABLE BAX	bax
U+A020	ꀠ	YI SYLLABLE BA	ba
U+A021	ꀡ	YI SYLLABLE BAP	bap
U+A022	ꀢ	YI SYLLABLE BUOX	buox
U+A023	ꀣ	YI SYLLABLE BUO	buo
U+A024	ꀤ	YI SYLLABLE BUOP	buop
U+A025	ꀥ	YI SYLLABLE BOT	bot
U+A026	ꀦ	YI SYLLABLE BOX	box
U+A027	ꀧ	YI SYLLABLE BO	bo
U+A028	ꀨ	YI SYLLABLE BOP	bop
U+A029	ꀩ	YI SYLLABLE BEX	bex
U+A02A	ꀪ	YI SYLLABLE BE	be
U+A02B	ꀫ	YI SYLLABLE BEP	bep
U+A02C	ꀬ	YI SYLLABLE BUT	but
U+A02D	ꀭ	YI SYLLABLE BUX	bux
U+A02E	ꀮ	YI SYLLABLE BU	bu
U+A02F	ꀯ	YI SYLLABLE BUP	bup
U+A030	ꀰ	YI SYLLABLE BURX	burx
U+A031	ꀱ	YI SYLLABLE BUR	bur
U+A032	ꀲ	YI SYLLABLE BYT	byt
U+A033	ꀳ	YI SYLLABLE BYX	byx
U+A034	ꀴ	YI SYLLABLE BY	by
U+A035	ꀵ	YI SYLLABLE BYP	byp
U+A036	ꀶ	YI SYLLABLE BYRX	byrx
U+A037	ꀷ	YI SYLLABLE BYR	byr
U+A038	ꀸ	YI SYLLABLE PIT	pit
U+A039	ꀹ	YI SYLLABLE PIX	pix
U+A03A	ꀺ	YI SYLLABLE PI	pi
U+A03B	ꀻ	YI SYLLABLE PIP	pip
U+A03C	ꀼ	YI SYLLABLE PIEX	piex
U+A03D	ꀽ	YI SYLLABLE PIE	pie
U+A03E	ꀾ	YI SYLLABLE PIEP	piep
U+A03F	ꀿ	YI SYLLABLE PAT	pat
U+A040	ꁀ	YI SYLLABLE PAX	pax
U+A041	ꁁ	YI SYLLABLE PA	pa
U+A042	ꁂ	YI SYLLABLE PAP	pap
U+A043	ꁃ	YI SYLLABLE PUOX	puox
U+A044	ꁄ	YI SYLLABLE PUO	puo
U+A045	ꁅ	YI SYLLABLE PUOP	puop
U+A046	ꁆ	YI SYLLABLE POT	pot
U+A047	ꁇ	YI SYLLABLE POX	pox
U+A048	ꁈ	YI SYLLABLE PO	po
U+A049	ꁉ	YI SYLLABLE POP	pop
U+A04A	ꁊ	YI SYLLABLE PUT	put
U+A04B	ꁋ	YI SYLLABLE PUX	pux
U+A04C	ꁌ	YI SYLLABLE PU	pu
U+A04D	ꁍ	YI SYLLABLE PUP	pup
U+A04E	ꁎ	YI SYLLABLE PURX	purx
U+A04F	ꁏ	YI SYLLABLE PUR	pur
U+A050	ꁐ	YI SYLLABLE PYT	pyt
U+A051	ꁑ	YI SYLLABLE PYX	pyx
U+A052	ꁒ	YI SYLLABLE PY	py
U+A053	ꁓ	YI SYLLABLE PYP	pyp
U+A054	ꁔ	YI SYLLABLE PYRX	pyrx
U+A055	ꁕ	YI SYLLABLE PYR	pyr
U+A056	ꁖ	YI SYLLABLE BBIT	bbit
U+A057	ꁗ	YI SYLLABLE BBIX	bbix
U+A058	ꁘ	YI SYLLABLE BBI	bbi
U+A059	ꁙ	YI SYLLABLE BBIP	bbip
U+A05A	ꁚ	YI SYLLABLE BBIET	bbiet
U+A05B	ꁛ	YI SYLLABLE BBIEX	bbiex
U+A05C	ꁜ	YI SYLLABLE BBIE	bbie
U+A05D	ꁝ	YI SYLLABLE BBIEP	bbiep
U+A05E	ꁞ	YI SYLLABLE BBAT	bbat
U+A05F	ꁟ	YI SYLLABLE BBAX	bbax
U+A060	ꁠ	YI SYLLABLE BBA	bba
U+A061	ꁡ	YI SYLLABLE BBAP	bbap
U+A062	ꁢ	YI SYLLABLE BBUOX	bbuox
U+A063	ꁣ	YI SYLLABLE BBUO	bbuo
U+A064	ꁤ	YI SYLLABLE BBUOP	bbuop
U+A065	ꁥ	YI SYLLABLE BBOT	bbot
U+A066	ꁦ	YI SYLLABLE BBOX	bbox
U+A067	ꁧ	YI SYLLABLE BBO	bbo
U+A068	ꁨ	YI SYLLABLE BBOP	bbop
U+A069	ꁩ	YI SYLLABLE BBEX	bbex
U+A06A	ꁪ	YI SYLLABLE BBE	bbe
U+A06B	ꁫ	YI SYLLABLE BBEP	bbep
U+A06C	ꁬ	YI SYLLABLE BBUT	bbut
U+A06D	ꁭ	YI SYLLABLE BBUX	bbux
U+A06E	ꁮ	YI SYLLABLE BBU	bbu
U+A06F	ꁯ	YI SYLLABLE BBUP	bbup
U+A070	ꁰ	YI SYLLABLE BBURX	bburx
U+A071	ꁱ	YI SYLLABLE BBUR	bbur
U+A072	ꁲ	YI SYLLABLE BBYT	bbyt
U+A073	ꁳ	YI SYLLABLE BBYX	bbyx
U+A074	ꁴ	YI SYLLABLE BBY	bby
U+A075	ꁵ	YI SYLLABLE BBYP	bbyp
U+A076	ꁶ	YI SYLLABLE NBIT	nbit
U+A077	ꁷ	YI SYLLABLE NBIX	nbix
U+A078	ꁸ	YI SYLLABLE NBI	nbi
U+A079	ꁹ	YI SYLLABLE NBIP	nbip
U+A07A	ꁺ	YI SYLLABLE NBIEX	nbiex
U+A07B	ꁻ	YI SYLLABLE NBIE	nbie
U+A07C	ꁼ	YI SYLLABLE NBIEP	nbiep
U+A07D	ꁽ	YI SYLLABLE NBAT	nbat
U+A07E	ꁾ	YI SYLLABLE NBAX	nbax
U+A07F	ꁿ	YI SYLLABLE NBA	nba
U+A080	ꂀ	YI SYLLABLE NBAP	nbap
U+A081	ꂁ	YI SYLLABLE NBOT	nbot
U+A082	ꂂ	YI SYLLABLE NBOX	nbox
U+A083	ꂃ	YI SYLLABLE NBO	nbo
U+A084	ꂄ	YI SYLLABLE NBOP	nbop
U+A085	ꂅ	YI SYLLABLE NBUT	nbut
U+A086	ꂆ	YI SYLLABLE NBUX	nbux
U+A087	ꂇ	YI SYLLABLE NBU	nbu
U+A088	ꂈ	YI SYLLABLE NBUP	nbup
U+A089	ꂉ	YI SYLLABLE NBURX	nburx
U+A08A	ꂊ	YI SYLLABLE NBUR	nbur
U+A08B	ꂋ	YI SYLLABLE NBYT	nbyt
U+A08C	ꂌ	YI SYLLABLE NBYX	nbyx
U+A08D	ꂍ	YI SYLLABLE NBY	nby
U+A08E	ꂎ	YI SYLLABLE NBYP	nbyp
U+A08F	ꂏ	YI SYLLABLE NBYRX	nbyrx
U+A090	ꂐ	YI SYLLABLE NBYR	nbyr
U+A091	ꂑ	YI SYLLABLE HMIT	hmit
U+A092	ꂒ	YI SYLLABLE HMIX	hmix
U+A093	ꂓ	YI SYLLABLE HMI	hmi
U+A094	ꂔ	YI SYLLABLE HMIP	hmip
U+A095	ꂕ	YI SYLLABLE HMIEX	hmiex
U+A096	ꂖ	YI SYLLABLE HMIE	hmie
U+A097	ꂗ	YI SYLLABLE HMIEP	hmiep
U+A098	ꂘ	YI SYLLABLE HMAT	hmat
U+A099	ꂙ	YI SYLLABLE HMAX	hmax
U+A09A	ꂚ	YI SYLLABLE HMA	hma
U+A09B	ꂛ	YI SYLLABLE HMAP	hmap
U+A09C	ꂜ	YI SYLLABLE HMUOX	hmuox
U+A09D	ꂝ	YI SYLLABLE HMUO	hmuo
U+A09E	ꂞ	YI SYLLABLE HMUOP	hmuop
U+A09F	ꂟ	YI SYLLABLE HMOT	hmot
U+A0A0	ꂠ	YI SYLLABLE HMOX	hmox
U+A0A1	ꂡ	YI SYLLABLE HMO	hmo
U+A0A2	ꂢ	YI SYLLABLE HMOP	hmop
U+A0A3	ꂣ	YI SYLLABLE HMUT	hmut
U+A0A4	ꂤ	YI SYLLABLE HMUX	hmux
U+A0A5	ꂥ	YI SYLLABLE HMU	hmu
U+A0A6	ꂦ	YI SYLLABLE HMUP	hmup
U+A0A7	ꂧ	YI SYLLABLE HMURX	hmurx
U+A0A8	ꂨ	YI SYLLABLE HMUR	hmur
U+A0A9	ꂩ	YI SYLLABLE HMYX	hmyx
U+A0AA	ꂪ	YI SYLLABLE HMY	hmy
U+A0AB	ꂫ	YI SYLLABLE HMYP	hmyp
U+A0AC	ꂬ	YI SYLLABLE HMYRX	hmyrx
U+A0AD	ꂭ	YI SYLLABLE HMYR	hmyr
U+A0AE	ꂮ	YI SYLLABLE MIT	mit
U+A0AF	ꂯ	YI SYLLABLE MIX	mix
U+A0B0	ꂰ	YI SYLLABLE MI	mi
U+A0B1	ꂱ	YI SYLLABLE MIP	mip
U+A0B2	ꂲ	YI SYLLABLE MIEX	miex
U+A0B3	ꂳ	YI SYLLABLE MIE	mie
U+A0B4	ꂴ	YI SYLLABLE MIEP	miep
U+A0B5	ꂵ	YI SYLLABLE MAT	mat
U+A0B6	ꂶ	YI SYLLABLE MAX	max
U+A0B7	ꂷ	YI SYLLABLE MA	ma
U+A0B8	ꂸ	YI SYLLABLE MAP	map
U+A0B9	ꂹ	YI SYLLABLE MUOT	muot
U+A0BA	ꂺ	YI SYLLABLE MUOX	muox
U+A0BB	ꂻ	YI SYLLABLE MUO	muo
U+A0BC	ꂼ	YI SYLLABLE MUOP	muop
U+A0BD	ꂽ	YI SYLLABLE MOT	mot
U+A0BE	ꂾ	YI SYLLABLE MOX	mox
U+A0BF	ꂿ	YI SYLLABLE MO	mo
U+A0C0	ꃀ	YI SYLLABLE MOP	mop
U+A0C1	ꃁ	YI SYLLABLE MEX	mex
U+A0C2	ꃂ	YI SYLLABLE ME	me
U+A0C3	ꃃ	YI SYLLABLE MUT	mut
U+A0C4	ꃄ	YI SYLLABLE MUX	mux
U+A0C5	ꃅ	YI SYLLABLE MU	mu
U+A0C6	ꃆ	YI SYLLABLE MUP	mup
U+A0C7	ꃇ	YI SYLLABLE MURX	murx
U+A0C8	ꃈ	YI SYLLABLE MUR	mur
U+A0C9	ꃉ	YI SYLLABLE MYT	myt
U+A0CA	ꃊ	YI SYLLABLE MYX	myx
U+A0CB	ꃋ	YI SYLLABLE MY	my
U+A0CC	ꃌ	YI SYLLABLE MYP	myp
U+A0CD	ꃍ	YI SYLLABLE FIT	fit
U+A0CE	ꃎ	YI SYLLABLE FIX	fix
U+A0CF	ꃏ	YI SYLLABLE FI	fi
U+A0D0	ꃐ	YI SYLLABLE FIP	fip
U+A0D1	ꃑ	YI SYLLABLE FAT	fat
U+A0D2	ꃒ	YI SYLLABLE FAX	fax
U+A0D3	ꃓ	YI SYLLABLE FA	fa
U+A0D4	ꃔ	YI SYLLABLE FAP	fap
U+A0D5	ꃕ	YI SYLLABLE FOX	fox
U+A0D6	ꃖ	YI SYLLABLE FO	fo
U+A0D7	ꃗ	YI SYLLABLE FOP	fop
U+A0D8	ꃘ	YI SYLLABLE FUT	fut
U+A0D9	ꃙ	YI SYLLABLE FUX	fux
U+A0DA	ꃚ	YI SYLLABLE FU	fu
U+A0DB	ꃛ	YI SYLLABLE FUP	fup
U+A0DC	ꃜ	YI SYLLABLE FURX	furx
U+A0DD	ꃝ	YI SYLLABLE FUR	fur
U+A0DE	ꃞ	YI SYLLABLE FYT	fyt
U+A0DF	ꃟ	YI SYLLABLE FYX	fyx
U+A0E0	ꃠ	YI SYLLABLE FY	fy
U+A0E1	ꃡ	YI SYLLABLE FYP	fyp
U+A0E2	ꃢ	YI SYLLABLE VIT	vit
U+A0E3	ꃣ	YI SYLLABLE VIX	vix
U+A0E4	ꃤ	YI SYLLABLE VI	vi
U+A0E5	ꃥ	YI SYLLABLE VIP	vip
U+A0E6	ꃦ	YI SYLLABLE VIET	viet
U+A0E7	ꃧ	YI SYLLABLE VIEX	viex
U+A0E8	ꃨ	YI SYLLABLE VIE	vie
U+A0E9	ꃩ	YI SYLLABLE VIEP	viep
U+A0EA	ꃪ	YI SYLLABLE VAT	vat
U+A0EB	ꃫ	YI SYLLABLE VAX	vax
U+A0EC	ꃬ	YI SYLLABLE VA	va
U+A0ED	ꃭ	YI SYLLABLE VAP	vap
U+A0EE	ꃮ	YI SYLLABLE VOT	vot
U+A0EF	ꃯ	YI SYLLABLE VOX	vox
U+A0F0	ꃰ	YI SYLLABLE VO	vo
U+A0F1	ꃱ	YI SYLLABLE VOP	vop
U+A0F2	ꃲ	YI SYLLABLE VEX	vex
U+A0F3	ꃳ	YI SYLLABLE VEP	vep
U+A0F4	ꃴ	YI SYLLABLE VUT	vut
U+A0F5	ꃵ	YI SYLLABLE VUX	vux
U+A0F6	ꃶ	YI SYLLABLE VU	vu
U+A0F7	ꃷ	YI SYLLABLE VUP	vup
U+A0F8	ꃸ	YI SYLLABLE VURX	vurx
U+A0F9	ꃹ	YI SYLLABLE VUR	vur
U+A0FA	ꃺ	YI SYLLABLE VYT	vyt
U+A0FB	ꃻ	YI SYLLABLE VYX	vyx
U+A0FC	ꃼ	YI SYLLABLE VY	vy
U+A0FD	ꃽ	YI SYLLABLE VYP	vyp
U+A0FE	ꃾ	YI SYLLABLE VYRX	vyrx
U+A0FF	ꃿ	YI SYLLABLE VYR	vyr
U+A100	ꄀ	YI SYLLABLE DIT	dit
U+A101	ꄁ	YI SYLLABLE DIX	dix
U+A102	ꄂ	YI SYLLABLE DI	di
U+A103	ꄃ	YI SYLLABLE DIP	dip
U+A104	ꄄ	YI SYLLABLE DIEX	diex
U+A105	ꄅ	YI SYLLABLE DIE	die
U+A106	ꄆ	YI SYLLABLE DIEP	diep
U+A107	ꄇ	YI SYLLABLE DAT	dat
U+A108	ꄈ	YI SYLLABLE DAX	dax
U+A109	ꄉ	YI SYLLABLE DA	da
U+A10A	ꄊ	YI SYLLABLE DAP	dap
U+A10B	ꄋ	YI SYLLABLE DUOX	duox
U+A10C	ꄌ	YI SYLLABLE DUO	duo
U+A10D	ꄍ	YI SYLLABLE DOT	dot
U+A10E	ꄎ	YI SYLLABLE DOX	dox
U+A10F	ꄏ	YI SYLLABLE DO	do
U+A110	ꄐ	YI SYLLABLE DOP	dop
U+A111	ꄑ	YI SYLLABLE DEX	dex
U+A112	ꄒ	YI SYLLABLE DE	de
U+A113	ꄓ	YI SYLLABLE DEP	dep
U+A114	ꄔ	YI SYLLABLE DUT	dut
U+A115	ꄕ	YI SYLLABLE DUX	dux
U+A116	ꄖ	YI SYLLABLE DU	du
U+A117	ꄗ	YI SYLLABLE DUP	dup
U+A118	ꄘ	YI SYLLABLE DURX	durx
U+A119	ꄙ	YI SYLLABLE DUR	dur
U+A11A	ꄚ	YI SYLLABLE TIT	tit
U+A11B	ꄛ	YI SYLLABLE TIX	tix
U+A11C	ꄜ	YI SYLLABLE TI	ti
U+A11D	ꄝ	YI SYLLABLE TIP	tip
U+A11E	ꄞ	YI SYLLABLE TIEX	tiex
U+A11F	ꄟ	YI SYLLABLE TIE	tie
U+A120	ꄠ	YI SYLLABLE TIEP	tiep
U+A121	ꄡ	YI SYLLABLE TAT	tat
U+A122	ꄢ	YI SYLLABLE TAX	tax
U+A123	ꄣ	YI SYLLABLE TA	ta
U+A124	ꄤ	YI SYLLABLE TAP	tap
U+A125	ꄥ	YI SYLLABLE TUOT	tuot
U+A126	ꄦ	YI SYLLABLE TUOX	tuox
U+A127	ꄧ	YI SYLLABLE TUO	tuo
U+A128	ꄨ	YI SYLLABLE TUOP	tuop
U+A129	ꄩ	YI SYLLABLE TOT	tot
U+A12A	ꄪ	YI SYLLABLE TOX	tox
U+A12B	ꄫ	YI SYLLABLE TO	to
U+A12C	ꄬ	YI SYLLABLE TOP	top
U+A12D	ꄭ	YI SYLLABLE TEX	tex
U+A12E	ꄮ	YI SYLLABLE TE	te
U+A12F	ꄯ	YI SYLLABLE TEP	tep
U+A130	ꄰ	YI SYLLABLE TUT	tut
U+A131	ꄱ	YI SYLLABLE TUX	tux
U+A132	ꄲ	YI SYLLABLE TU	tu
U+A133	ꄳ	YI SYLLABLE TUP	tup
U+A134	ꄴ	YI SYLLABLE TURX	turx
U+A135	ꄵ	YI SYLLABLE TUR	tur
U+A136	ꄶ	YI SYLLABLE DDIT	ddit
U+A137	ꄷ	YI SYLLABLE DDIX	ddix
U+A138	ꄸ	YI SYLLABLE DDI	ddi
U+A139	ꄹ	YI SYLLABLE DDIP	ddip
U+A13A	ꄺ	YI SYLLABLE DDIEX	ddiex
U+A13B	ꄻ	YI SYLLABLE DDIE	ddie
U+A13C	ꄼ	YI SYLLABLE DDIEP	ddiep
U+A13D	ꄽ	YI SYLLABLE DDAT	ddat
U+A13E	ꄾ	YI SYLLABLE DDAX	ddax
U+A13F	ꄿ	YI SYLLABLE DDA	dda
U+A140	ꅀ	YI SYLLABLE DDAP	ddap
U+A141	ꅁ	YI SYLLABLE DDUOX	dduox
U+A142	ꅂ	YI SYLLABLE DDUO	dduo
U+A143	ꅃ	YI SYLLABLE DDUOP	dduop
U+A144	ꅄ	YI SYLLABLE DDOT	ddot
U+A145	ꅅ	YI SYLLABLE DDOX	ddox
U+A146	ꅆ	YI SYLLABLE DDO	ddo
U+A147	ꅇ	YI SYLLABLE DDOP	ddop
U+A148	ꅈ	YI SYLLABLE DDEX	ddex
U+A149	ꅉ	YI SYLLABLE DDE	dde
U+A14A	ꅊ	YI SYLLABLE DDEP	ddep
U+A14B	ꅋ	YI SYLLABLE DDUT	ddut
U+A14C	ꅌ	YI SYLLABLE DDUX	ddux
U+A14D	ꅍ	YI SYLLABLE DDU	ddu
U+A14E	ꅎ	YI SYLLABLE DDUP	ddup
U+A14F	ꅏ	YI SYLLABLE DDURX	ddurx
U+A150	ꅐ	YI SYLLABLE DDUR	ddur
U+A151	ꅑ	YI SYLLABLE NDIT	ndit
U+A152	ꅒ	YI SYLLABLE NDIX	ndix
U+A153	ꅓ	YI SYLLABLE NDI	ndi
U+A154	ꅔ	YI SYLLABLE NDIP	ndip
U+A155	ꅕ	YI SYLLABLE NDIEX	ndiex
U+A156	ꅖ	YI SYLLABLE NDIE	ndie
U+A157	ꅗ	YI SYLLABLE NDAT	ndat
U+A158	ꅘ	YI SYLLABLE NDAX	ndax
U+A159	ꅙ	YI SYLLABLE NDA	nda
U+A15A	ꅚ	YI SYLLABLE NDAP	ndap
U+A15B	ꅛ	YI SYLLABLE NDOT	ndot
U+A15C	ꅜ	YI SYLLABLE NDOX	ndox
U+A15D	ꅝ	YI SYLLABLE NDO	ndo
U+A15E	ꅞ	YI SYLLABLE NDOP	ndop
U+A15F	ꅟ	YI SYLLABLE NDEX	ndex
U+A160	ꅠ	YI SYLLABLE NDE	nde
U+A161	ꅡ	YI SYLLABLE NDEP	ndep
U+A162	ꅢ	YI SYLLABLE NDUT	ndut
U+A163	ꅣ	YI SYLLABLE NDUX	ndux
U+A164	ꅤ	YI SYLLABLE NDU	ndu
U+A165	ꅥ	YI SYLLABLE NDUP	ndup
U+A166	ꅦ	YI SYLLABLE NDURX	ndurx
U+A167	ꅧ	YI SYLLABLE NDUR	ndur
U+A168	ꅨ	YI SYLLABLE HNIT	hnit
U+A169	ꅩ	YI SYLLABLE HNIX	hnix
U+A16A	ꅪ	YI SYLLABLE HNI	hni
U+A16B	ꅫ	YI SYLLABLE HNIP	hnip
U+A16C	ꅬ	YI SYLLABLE HNIET	hniet
U+A16D	ꅭ	YI SYLLABLE HNIEX	hniex
U+A16E	ꅮ	YI SYLLABLE HNIE	hnie
U+A16F	ꅯ	YI SYLLABLE HNIEP	hniep
U+A170	ꅰ	YI SYLLABLE HNAT	hnat
U+A171	ꅱ	YI SYLLABLE HNAX	hnax
U+A172	ꅲ	YI SYLLABLE HNA	hna
U+A173	ꅳ	YI SYLLABLE HNAP	hnap
U+A174	ꅴ	YI SYLLABLE HNUOX	hnuox
U+A175	ꅵ	YI SYLLABLE HNUO	hnuo
U+A176	ꅶ	YI SYLLABLE HNOT	hnot
U+A177	ꅷ	YI SYLLABLE HNOX	hnox
U+A178	ꅸ	YI SYLLABLE HNOP	hnop
U+A179	ꅹ	YI SYLLABLE HNEX	hnex
U+A17A	ꅺ	YI SYLLABLE HNE	hne
U+A17B	ꅻ	YI SYLLABLE HNEP	hnep
U+A17C	ꅼ	YI SYLLABLE HNUT	hnut
U+A17D	ꅽ	YI SYLLABLE NIT	nit
U+A17E	ꅾ	YI SYLLABLE NIX	nix
U+A17F	ꅿ	YI SYLLABLE NI	ni
U+A180	ꆀ	YI SYLLABLE NIP	nip
U+A181	ꆁ	YI SYLLABLE NIEX	niex
U+A182	ꆂ	YI SYLLABLE NIE	nie
U+A183	ꆃ	YI SYLLABLE NIEP	niep
U+A184	ꆄ	YI SYLLABLE NAX	nax
U+A185	ꆅ	YI SYLLABLE NA	na
U+A186	ꆆ	YI SYLLABLE NAP	nap
U+A187	ꆇ	YI SYLLABLE NUOX	nuox
U+A188	ꆈ	YI SYLLABLE NUO	nuo
U+A189	ꆉ	YI SYLLABLE NUOP	nuop
U+A18A	ꆊ	YI SYLLABLE NOT	not
U+A18B	ꆋ	YI SYLLABLE NOX	nox
U+A18C	ꆌ	YI SYLLABLE NO	no
U+A18D	ꆍ	YI SYLLABLE NOP	nop
U+A18E	ꆎ	YI SYLLABLE NEX	nex
U+A18F	ꆏ	YI SYLLABLE NE	ne
U+A190	ꆐ	YI SYLLABLE NEP	nep
U+A191	ꆑ	YI SYLLABLE NUT	nut
U+A192	ꆒ	YI SYLLABLE NUX	nux
U+A193	ꆓ	YI SYLLABLE NU	nu
U+A194	ꆔ	YI SYLLABLE NUP	nup
U+A195	ꆕ	YI SYLLABLE NURX	nurx
U+A196	ꆖ	YI SYLLABLE NUR	nur
U+A197	ꆗ	YI SYLLABLE HLIT	hlit
U+A198	ꆘ	YI SYLLABLE HLIX	hlix
U+A199	ꆙ	YI SYLLABLE HLI	hli
U+A19A	ꆚ	YI SYLLABLE HLIP	hlip
U+A19B	ꆛ	YI SYLLABLE HLIEX	hliex
U+A19C	ꆜ	YI SYLLABLE HLIE	hlie
U+A19D	ꆝ	YI SYLLABLE HLIEP	hliep
U+A19E	ꆞ	YI SYLLABLE HLAT	hlat
U+A19F	ꆟ	YI SYLLABLE HLAX	hlax
U+A1A0	ꆠ	YI SYLLABLE HLA	hla
U+A1A1	ꆡ	YI SYLLABLE HLAP	hlap
U+A1A2	ꆢ	YI SYLLABLE HLUOX	hluox
U+A1A3	ꆣ	YI SYLLABLE HLUO	hluo
U+A1A4	ꆤ	YI SYLLABLE HLUOP	hluop
U+A1A5	ꆥ	YI SYLLABLE HLOX	hlox
U+A1A6	ꆦ	YI SYLLABLE HLO	hlo
U+A1A7	ꆧ	YI SYLLABLE HLOP	hlop
U+A1A8	ꆨ	YI SYLLABLE HLEX	hlex
U+A1A9	ꆩ	YI SYLLABLE HLE	hle
U+A1AA	ꆪ	YI SYLLABLE HLEP	hlep
U+A1AB	ꆫ	YI SYLLABLE HLUT	hlut
U+A1AC	ꆬ	YI SYLLABLE HLUX	hlux
U+A1AD	ꆭ	YI SYLLABLE HLU	hlu
U+A1AE	ꆮ	YI SYLLABLE HLUP	hlup
U+A1AF	ꆯ	YI SYLLABLE HLURX	hlurx
U+A1B0	ꆰ	YI SYLLABLE HLUR	hlur
U+A1B1	ꆱ	YI SYLLABLE HLYT	hlyt
U+A1B2	ꆲ	YI SYLLABLE HLYX	hlyx
U+A1B3	ꆳ	YI SYLLABLE HLY	hly
U+A1B4	ꆴ	YI SYLLABLE HLYP	hlyp
U+A1B5	ꆵ	YI SYLLABLE HLYRX	hlyrx
U+A1B6	ꆶ	YI SYLLABLE HLYR	hlyr
U+A1B7	ꆷ	YI SYLLABLE LIT	lit
U+A1B8	ꆸ	YI SYLLABLE LIX	lix
U+A1B9	ꆹ	YI SYLLABLE LI	li
U+A1BA	ꆺ	YI SYLLABLE LIP	lip
U+A1BB	ꆻ	YI SYLLABLE LIET	liet
U+A1BC	ꆼ	YI SYLLABLE LIEX	liex
U+A1BD	ꆽ	YI SYLLABLE LIE	lie
U+A1BE	ꆾ	YI SYLLABLE LIEP	liep
U+A1BF	ꆿ	YI SYLLABLE LAT	lat
U+A1C0	ꇀ	YI SYLLABLE LAX	lax
U+A1C1	ꇁ	YI SYLLABLE LA	la
U+A1C2	ꇂ	YI SYLLABLE LAP	lap
U+A1C3	ꇃ	YI SYLLABLE LUOT	luot
U+A1C4	ꇄ	YI SYLLABLE LUOX	luox
U+A1C5	ꇅ	YI SYLLABLE LUO	luo
U+A1C6	ꇆ	YI SYLLABLE LUOP	luop
U+A1C7	ꇇ	YI SYLLABLE LOT	lot
U+A1C8	ꇈ	YI SYLLABLE LOX	lox
U+A1C9	ꇉ	YI SYLLABLE LO	lo
U+A1CA	ꇊ	YI SYLLABLE LOP	lop
U+A1CB	ꇋ	YI SYLLABLE LEX	lex
U+A1CC	ꇌ	YI SYLLABLE LE	le
U+A1CD	ꇍ	YI SYLLABLE LEP	lep
U+A1CE	ꇎ	YI SYLLABLE LUT	lut
U+A1CF	ꇏ	YI SYLLABLE LUX	lux
U+A1D0	ꇐ	YI SYLLABLE LU	lu
U+A1D1	ꇑ	YI SYLLABLE LUP	lup
U+A1D2	ꇒ	YI SYLLABLE LURX	lurx
U+A1D3	ꇓ	YI SYLLABLE LUR	lur
U+A1D4	ꇔ	YI SYLLABLE LYT	lyt
U+A1D5	ꇕ	YI SYLLABLE LYX	lyx
U+A1D6	ꇖ	YI SYLLABLE LY	ly
U+A1D7	ꇗ	YI SYLLABLE LYP	lyp
U+A1D8	ꇘ	YI SYLLABLE LYRX	lyrx
U+A1D9	ꇙ	YI SYLLABLE LYR	lyr
U+A1DA	ꇚ	YI SYLLABLE GIT	git
U+A1DB	ꇛ	YI SYLLABLE GIX	gix
U+A1DC	ꇜ	YI SYLLABLE GI	gi
U+A1DD	ꇝ	YI SYLLABLE GIP	gip
U+A1DE	ꇞ	YI SYLLABLE GIET	giet
U+A1DF	ꇟ	YI SYLLABLE GIEX	giex
U+A1E0	ꇠ	YI SYLLABLE GIE	gie
U+A1E1	ꇡ	YI SYLLABLE GIEP	giep
U+A1E2	ꇢ	YI SYLLABLE GAT	gat
U+A1E3	ꇣ	YI SYLLABLE GAX	gax
U+A1E4	ꇤ	YI SYLLABLE GA	ga
U+A1E5	ꇥ	YI SYLLABLE GAP	gap
U+A1E6	ꇦ	YI SYLLABLE GUOT	guot
U+A1E7	ꇧ	YI SYLLABLE GUOX	guox
U+A1E8	ꇨ	YI SYLLABLE GUO	guo
U+A1E9	ꇩ	YI SYLLABLE GUOP	guop
U+A1EA	ꇪ	YI SYLLABLE GOT	got
U+A1EB	ꇫ	YI SYLLABLE GOX	gox
U+A1EC	ꇬ	YI SYLLABLE GO	go
U+A1ED	ꇭ	YI SYLLABLE GOP	gop
U+A1EE	ꇮ	YI SYLLABLE GET	get
U+A1EF	ꇯ	YI SYLLABLE GEX	gex
U+A1F0	ꇰ	YI SYLLABLE GE	ge
U+A1F1	ꇱ	YI SYLLABLE GEP	gep
U+A1F2	ꇲ	YI SYLLABLE GUT	gut
U+A1F3	ꇳ	YI SYLLABLE GUX	gux
U+A1F4	ꇴ	YI SYLLABLE GU	gu
U+A1F5	ꇵ	YI SYLLABLE GUP	gup
U+A1F6	ꇶ	YI SYLLABLE GURX	gurx
U+A1F7	ꇷ	YI SYLLABLE GUR	gur
U+A1F8	ꇸ	YI SYLLABLE KIT	kit
U+A1F9	ꇹ	YI SYLLABLE KIX	kix
U+A1FA	ꇺ	YI SYLLABLE KI	ki
U+A1FB	ꇻ	YI SYLLABLE KIP	kip
U+A1FC	ꇼ	YI SYLLABLE KIEX	kiex
U+A1FD	ꇽ	YI SYLLABLE KIE	kie
U+A1FE	ꇾ	YI SYLLABLE KIEP	kiep
U+A1FF	ꇿ	YI SYLLABLE KAT	kat
U+A200	ꈀ	YI SYLLABLE KAX	kax
U+A201	ꈁ	YI SYLLABLE KA	ka
U+A202	ꈂ	YI SYLLABLE KAP	kap
U+A203	ꈃ	YI SYLLABLE KUOX	kuox
U+A204	ꈄ	YI SYLLABLE KUO	kuo
U+A205	ꈅ	YI SYLLABLE KUOP	kuop
U+A206	ꈆ	YI SYLLABLE KOT	kot
U+A207	ꈇ	YI SYLLABLE KOX	kox
U+A208	ꈈ	YI SYLLABLE KO	ko
U+A209	ꈉ	YI SYLLABLE KOP	kop
U+A20A	ꈊ	YI SYLLABLE KET	ket
U+A20B	ꈋ	YI SYLLABLE KEX	kex
U+A20C	ꈌ	YI SYLLABLE KE	ke
U+A20D	ꈍ	YI SYLLABLE KEP	kep
U+A20E	ꈎ	YI SYLLABLE KUT	kut
U+A20F	ꈏ	YI SYLLABLE KUX	kux
U+A210	ꈐ	YI SYLLABLE KU	ku
U+A211	ꈑ	YI SYLLABLE KUP	kup
U+A212	ꈒ	YI SYLLABLE KURX	kurx
U+A213	ꈓ	YI SYLLABLE KUR	kur
U+A214	ꈔ	YI SYLLABLE GGIT	ggit
U+A215	ꈕ	YI SYLLABLE GGIX	ggix
U+A216	ꈖ	YI SYLLABLE GGI	ggi
U+A217	ꈗ	YI SYLLABLE GGIEX	ggiex
U+A218	ꈘ	YI SYLLABLE GGIE	ggie
U+A219	ꈙ	YI SYLLABLE GGIEP	ggiep
U+A21A	ꈚ	YI SYLLABLE GGAT	ggat
U+A21B	ꈛ	YI SYLLABLE GGAX	ggax
U+A21C	ꈜ	YI SYLLABLE GGA	gga
U+A21D	ꈝ	YI SYLLABLE GGAP	ggap
U+A21E	ꈞ	YI SYLLABLE GGUOT	gguot
U+A21F	ꈟ	YI SYLLABLE GGUOX	gguox
U+A220	ꈠ	YI SYLLABLE GGUO	gguo
U+A221	ꈡ	YI SYLLABLE GGUOP	gguop
U+A222	ꈢ	YI SYLLABLE GGOT	ggot
U+A223	ꈣ	YI SYLLABLE GGOX	ggox
U+A224	ꈤ	YI SYLLABLE GGO	ggo
U+A225	ꈥ	YI SYLLABLE GGOP	ggop
U+A226	ꈦ	YI SYLLABLE GGET	gget
U+A227	ꈧ	YI SYLLABLE GGEX	ggex
U+A228	ꈨ	YI SYLLABLE GGE	gge
U+A229	ꈩ	YI SYLLABLE GGEP	ggep
U+A22A	ꈪ	YI SYLLABLE GGUT	ggut
U+A22B	ꈫ	YI SYLLABLE GGUX	ggux
U+A22C	ꈬ	YI SYLLABLE GGU	ggu
U+A22D	ꈭ	YI SYLLABLE GGUP	ggup
U+A22E	ꈮ	YI SYLLABLE GGURX	ggurx
U+A22F	ꈯ	YI SYLLABLE GGUR	ggur
U+A230	ꈰ	YI SYLLABLE MGIEX	mgiex
U+A231	ꈱ	YI SYLLABLE MGIE	mgie
U+A232	ꈲ	YI SYLLABLE MGAT	mgat
U+A233	ꈳ	YI SYLLABLE MGAX	mgax
U+A234	ꈴ	YI SYLLABLE MGA	mga
U+A235	ꈵ	YI SYLLABLE MGAP	mgap
U+A236	ꈶ	YI SYLLABLE MGUOX	mguox
U+A237	ꈷ	YI SYLLABLE MGUO	mguo
U+A238	ꈸ	YI SYLLABLE MGUOP	mguop
U+A239	ꈹ	YI SYLLABLE MGOT	mgot
U+A23A	ꈺ	YI SYLLABLE MGOX	mgox
U+A23B	ꈻ	YI SYLLABLE MGO	mgo
U+A23C	ꈼ	YI SYLLABLE MGOP	mgop
U+A23D	ꈽ	YI SYLLABLE MGEX	mgex
U+A23E	ꈾ	YI SYLLABLE MGE	mge
U+A23F	ꈿ	YI SYLLABLE MGEP	mgep
U+A240	ꉀ	YI SYLLABLE MGUT	mgut
U+A241	ꉁ	YI SYLLABLE MGUX	mgux
U+A242	ꉂ	YI SYLLABLE MGU	mgu
U+A243	ꉃ	YI SYLLABLE MGUP	mgup
U+A244	ꉄ	YI SYLLABLE MGURX	mgurx
U+A245	ꉅ	YI SYLLABLE MGUR	mgur
U+A246	ꉆ	YI SYLLABLE HXIT	hxit
U+A247	ꉇ	YI SYLLABLE HXIX	hxix
U+A248	ꉈ	YI SYLLABLE HXI	hxi
U+A249	ꉉ	YI SYLLABLE HXIP	hxip
U+A24A	ꉊ	YI SYLLABLE HXIET	hxiet
U+A24B	ꉋ	YI SYLLABLE HXIEX	hxiex
U+A24C	ꉌ	YI SYLLABLE HXIE	hxie
U+A24D	ꉍ	YI SYLLABLE HXIEP	hxiep
U+A24E	ꉎ	YI SYLLABLE HXAT	hxat
U+A24F	ꉏ	YI SYLLABLE HXAX	hxax
U+A250	ꉐ	YI SYLLABLE HXA	hxa
U+A251	ꉑ	YI SYLLABLE HXAP	hxap
U+A252	ꉒ	YI SYLLABLE HXUOT	hxuot
U+A253	ꉓ	YI SYLLABLE HXUOX	hxuox
U+A254	ꉔ	YI SYLLABLE HXUO	hxuo
U+A255	ꉕ	YI SYLLABLE HXUOP	hxuop
U+A256	ꉖ	YI SYLLABLE HXOT	hxot
U+A257	ꉗ	YI SYLLABLE HXOX	hxox
U+A258	ꉘ	YI SYLLABLE HXO	hxo
U+A259	ꉙ	YI SYLLABLE HXOP	hxop
U+A25A	ꉚ	YI SYLLABLE HXEX	hxex
U+A25B	ꉛ	YI SYLLABLE HXE	hxe
U+A25C	ꉜ	YI SYLLABLE HXEP	hxep
U+A25D	ꉝ	YI SYLLABLE NGIEX	ngiex
U+A25E	ꉞ	YI SYLLABLE NGIE	ngie
U+A25F	ꉟ	YI SYLLABLE NGIEP	ngiep
U+A260	ꉠ	YI SYLLABLE NGAT	ngat
U+A261	ꉡ	YI SYLLABLE NGAX	ngax
U+A262	ꉢ	YI SYLLABLE NGA	nga
U+A263	ꉣ	YI SYLLABLE NGAP	ngap
U+A264	ꉤ	YI SYLLABLE NGUOT	nguot
U+A265	ꉥ	YI SYLLABLE NGUOX	nguox
U+A266	ꉦ	YI SYLLABLE NGUO	nguo
U+A267	ꉧ	YI SYLLABLE NGOT	ngot
U+A268	ꉨ	YI SYLLABLE NGOX	ngox
U+A269	ꉩ	YI SYLLABLE NGO	ngo
U+A26A	ꉪ	YI SYLLABLE NGOP	ngop
U+A26B	ꉫ	YI SYLLABLE NGEX	ngex
U+A26C	ꉬ	YI SYLLABLE NGE	nge
U+A26D	ꉭ	YI SYLLABLE NGEP	ngep
U+A26E	ꉮ	YI SYLLABLE HIT	hit
U+A26F	ꉯ	YI SYLLABLE HIEX	hiex
U+A270	ꉰ	YI SYLLABLE HIE	hie
U+A271	ꉱ	YI SYLLABLE HAT	hat
U+A272	ꉲ	YI SYLLABLE HAX	hax
U+A273	ꉳ	YI SYLLABLE HA	ha
U+A274	ꉴ	YI SYLLABLE HAP	hap
U+A275	ꉵ	YI SYLLABLE HUOT	huot
U+A276	ꉶ	YI SYLLABLE HUOX	huox
U+A277	ꉷ	YI SYLLABLE HUO	huo
U+A278	ꉸ	YI SYLLABLE HUOP	huop
U+A279	ꉹ	YI SYLLABLE HOT	hot
U+A27A	ꉺ	YI SYLLABLE HOX	hox
U+A27B	ꉻ	YI SYLLABLE HO	ho
U+A27C	ꉼ	YI SYLLABLE HOP	hop
U+A27D	ꉽ	YI SYLLABLE HEX	hex
U+A27E	ꉾ	YI SYLLABLE HE	he
U+A27F	ꉿ	YI SYLLABLE HEP	hep
U+A280	ꊀ	YI SYLLABLE WAT	wat
U+A281	ꊁ	YI SYLLABLE WAX	wax
U+A282	ꊂ	YI SYLLABLE WA	wa
U+A283	ꊃ	YI SYLLABLE WAP	wap
U+A284	ꊄ	YI SYLLABLE WUOX	wuox
U+A285	ꊅ	YI SYLLABLE WUO	wuo
U+A286	ꊆ	YI SYLLABLE WUOP	wuop
U+A287	ꊇ	YI SYLLABLE WOX	wox
U+A288	ꊈ	YI SYLLABLE WO	wo
U+A289	ꊉ	YI SYLLABLE WOP	wop
U+A28A	ꊊ	YI SYLLABLE WEX	wex
U+A28B	ꊋ	YI SYLLABLE WE	we
U+A28C	ꊌ	YI SYLLABLE WEP	wep
U+A28D	ꊍ	YI SYLLABLE ZIT	zit
U+A28E	ꊎ	YI SYLLABLE ZIX	zix
U+A28F	ꊏ	YI SYLLABLE ZI	zi
U+A290	ꊐ	YI SYLLABLE ZIP	zip
U+A291	ꊑ	YI SYLLABLE ZIEX	ziex
U+A292	ꊒ	YI SYLLABLE ZIE	zie
U+A293	ꊓ	YI SYLLABLE ZIEP	ziep
U+A294	ꊔ	YI SYLLABLE ZAT	zat
U+A295	ꊕ	YI SYLLABLE ZAX	zax
U+A296	ꊖ	YI SYLLABLE ZA	za
U+A297	ꊗ	YI SYLLABLE ZAP	zap
U+A298	ꊘ	YI SYLLABLE ZUOX	zuox
U+A299	ꊙ	YI SYLLABLE ZUO	zuo
U+A29A	ꊚ	YI SYLLABLE ZUOP	zuop
U+A29B	ꊛ	YI SYLLABLE ZOT	zot
U+A29C	ꊜ	YI SYLLABLE ZOX	zox
U+A29D	ꊝ	YI SYLLABLE ZO	zo
U+A29E	ꊞ	YI SYLLABLE ZOP	zop
U+A29F	ꊟ	YI SYLLABLE ZEX	zex
U+A2A0	ꊠ	YI SYLLABLE ZE	ze
U+A2A1	ꊡ	YI SYLLABLE ZEP	zep
U+A2A2	ꊢ	YI SYLLABLE ZUT	zut
U+A2A3	ꊣ	YI SYLLABLE ZUX	zux
U+A2A4	ꊤ	YI SYLLABLE ZU	zu
U+A2A5	ꊥ	YI SYLLABLE ZUP	zup
U+A2A6	ꊦ	YI SYLLABLE ZURX	zurx
U+A2A7	ꊧ	YI SYLLABLE ZUR	zur
U+A2A8	ꊨ	YI SYLLABLE ZYT	zyt
U+A2A9	ꊩ	YI SYLLABLE ZYX	zyx
U+A2AA	ꊪ	YI SYLLABLE ZY	zy
U+A2AB	ꊫ	YI SYLLABLE ZYP	zyp
U+A2AC	ꊬ	YI SYLLABLE ZYRX	zyrx
U+A2AD	ꊭ	YI SYLLABLE ZYR	zyr
U+A2AE	ꊮ	YI SYLLABLE CIT	cit
U+A2AF	ꊯ	YI SYLLABLE CIX	cix
U+A2B0	ꊰ	YI SYLLABLE CI	ci
U+A2B1	ꊱ	YI SYLLABLE CIP	cip
U+A2B2	ꊲ	YI SYLLABLE CIET	ciet
U+A2B3	ꊳ	YI SYLLABLE CIEX	ciex
U+A2B4	ꊴ	YI SYLLABLE CIE	cie
U+A2B5	ꊵ	YI SYLLABLE CIEP	ciep
U+A2B6	ꊶ	YI SYLLABLE CAT	cat
U+A2B7	ꊷ	YI SYLLABLE CAX	cax
U+A2B8	ꊸ	YI SYLLABLE CA	ca
U+A2B9	ꊹ	YI SYLLABLE CAP	cap
U+A2BA	ꊺ	YI SYLLABLE CUOX	cuox
U+A2BB	ꊻ	YI SYLLABLE CUO	cuo
U+A2BC	ꊼ	YI SYLLABLE CUOP	cuop
U+A2BD	ꊽ	YI SYLLABLE COT	cot
U+A2BE	ꊾ	YI SYLLABLE COX	cox
U+A2BF	ꊿ	YI SYLLABLE CO	co
U+A2C0	ꋀ	YI SYLLABLE COP	cop
U+A2C1	ꋁ	YI SYLLABLE CEX	cex
U+A2C2	ꋂ	YI SYLLABLE CE	ce
U+A2C3	ꋃ	YI SYLLABLE CEP	cep
U+A2C4	ꋄ	YI SYLLABLE CUT	cut
U+A2C5	ꋅ	YI SYLLABLE CUX	cux
U+A2C6	ꋆ	YI SYLLABLE CU	cu
U+A2C7	ꋇ	YI SYLLABLE CUP	cup
U+A2C8	ꋈ	YI SYLLABLE CURX	curx
U+A2C9	ꋉ	YI SYLLABLE CUR	cur
U+A2CA	ꋊ	YI SYLLABLE CYT	cyt
U+A2CB	ꋋ	YI SYLLABLE CYX	cyx
U+A2CC	ꋌ	YI SYLLABLE CY	cy
U+A2CD	ꋍ	YI SYLLABLE CYP	cyp
U+A2CE	ꋎ	YI SYLLABLE CYRX	cyrx
U+A2CF	ꋏ	YI SYLLABLE CYR	cyr
U+A2D0	ꋐ	YI SYLLABLE ZZIT	zzit
U+A2D1	ꋑ	YI SYLLABLE ZZIX	zzix
U+A2D2	ꋒ	YI SYLLABLE ZZI	zzi
U+A2D3	ꋓ	YI SYLLABLE ZZIP	zzip
U+A2D4	ꋔ	YI SYLLABLE ZZIET	zziet
U+A2D5	ꋕ	YI SYLLABLE ZZIEX	zziex
U+A2D6	ꋖ	YI SYLLABLE ZZIE	zzie
U+A2D7	ꋗ	YI SYLLABLE ZZIEP	zziep
U+A2D8	ꋘ	YI SYLLABLE ZZAT	zzat
U+A2D9	ꋙ	YI SYLLABLE ZZAX	zzax
U+A2DA	ꋚ	YI SYLLABLE ZZA	zza
U+A2DB	ꋛ	YI SYLLABLE ZZAP	zzap
U+A2DC	ꋜ	YI SYLLABLE ZZOX	zzox
U+A2DD	ꋝ	YI SYLLABLE ZZO	zzo
U+A2DE	ꋞ	YI SYLLABLE ZZOP	zzop
U+A2DF	ꋟ	YI SYLLABLE ZZEX	zzex
U+A2E0	ꋠ	YI SYLLABLE ZZE	zze
U+A2E1	ꋡ	YI SYLLABLE ZZEP	zzep
U+A2E2	ꋢ	YI SYLLABLE ZZUX	zzux
U+A2E3	ꋣ	YI SYLLABLE ZZU	zzu
U+A2E4	ꋤ	YI SYLLABLE ZZUP	zzup
U+A2E5	ꋥ	YI SYLLABLE ZZURX	zzurx
U+A2E6	ꋦ	YI SYLLABLE ZZUR	zzur
U+A2E7	ꋧ	YI SYLLABLE ZZYT	zzyt
U+A2E8	ꋨ	YI SYLLABLE ZZYX	zzyx
U+A2E9	ꋩ	YI SYLLABLE ZZY	zzy
U+A2EA	ꋪ	YI SYLLABLE ZZYP	zzyp
U+A2EB	ꋫ	YI SYLLABLE ZZYRX	zzyrx
U+A2EC	ꋬ	YI SYLLABLE ZZYR	zzyr
U+A2ED	ꋭ	YI SYLLABLE NZIT	nzit
U+A2EE	ꋮ	YI SYLLABLE NZIX	nzix
U+A2EF	ꋯ	YI SYLLABLE NZI	nzi
U+A2F0	ꋰ	YI SYLLABLE NZIP	nzip
U+A2F1	ꋱ	YI SYLLABLE NZIEX	nziex
U+A2F2	ꋲ	YI SYLLABLE NZIE	nzie
U+A2F3	ꋳ	YI SYLLABLE NZIEP	nziep
U+A2F4	ꋴ	YI SYLLABLE NZAT	nzat
U+A2F5	ꋵ	YI SYLLABLE NZAX	nzax
U+A2F6	ꋶ	YI SYLLABLE NZA	nza
U+A2F7	ꋷ	YI SYLLABLE NZAP	nzap
U+A2F8	ꋸ	YI SYLLABLE NZUOX	nzuox
U+A2F9	ꋹ	YI SYLLABLE NZUO	nzuo
U+A2FA	ꋺ	YI SYLLABLE NZOX	nzox
U+A2FB	ꋻ	YI SYLLABLE NZOP	nzop
U+A2FC	ꋼ	YI SYLLABLE NZEX	nzex
U+A2FD	ꋽ	YI SYLLABLE NZE	nze
U+A2FE	ꋾ	YI SYLLABLE NZUX	nzux
U+A2FF	ꋿ	YI SYLLABLE NZU	nzu
U+A300	ꌀ	YI SYLLABLE NZUP	nzup
U+A301	ꌁ	YI SYLLABLE NZURX	nzurx
U+A302	ꌂ	YI SYLLABLE NZUR	nzur
U+A303	ꌃ	YI SYLLABLE NZYT	nzyt
U+A304	ꌄ	YI SYLLABLE NZYX	nzyx
U+A305	ꌅ	YI SYLLABLE NZY	nzy
U+A306	ꌆ	YI SYLLABLE NZYP	nzyp
U+A307	ꌇ	YI SYLLABLE NZYRX	nzyrx
U+A308	ꌈ	YI SYLLABLE NZYR	nzyr
U+A309	ꌉ	YI SYLLABLE SIT	sit
U+A30A	ꌊ	YI SYLLABLE SIX	six
U+A30B	ꌋ	YI SYLLABLE SI	si
U+A30C	ꌌ	YI SYLLABLE SIP	sip
U+A30D	ꌍ	YI SYLLABLE SIEX	siex
U+A30E	ꌎ	YI SYLLABLE SIE	sie
U+A30F	ꌏ	YI SYLLABLE SIEP	siep
U+A310	ꌐ	YI SYLLABLE SAT	sat
U+A311	ꌑ	YI SYLLABLE SAX	sax
U+A312	ꌒ	YI SYLLABLE SA	sa
U+A313	ꌓ	YI SYLLABLE SAP	sap
U+A314	ꌔ	YI SYLLABLE SUOX	suox
U+A315	ꌕ	YI SYLLABLE SUO	suo
U+A316	ꌖ	YI SYLLABLE SUOP	suop
U+A317	ꌗ	YI SYLLABLE SOT	sot
U+A318	ꌘ	YI SYLLABLE SOX	sox
U+A319	ꌙ	YI SYLLABLE SO	so
U+A31A	ꌚ	YI SYLLABLE SOP	sop
U+A31B	ꌛ	YI SYLLABLE SEX	sex
U+A31C	ꌜ	YI SYLLABLE SE	se
U+A31D	ꌝ	YI SYLLABLE SEP	sep
U+A31E	ꌞ	YI SYLLABLE SUT	sut
U+A31F	ꌟ	YI SYLLABLE SUX	sux
U+A320	ꌠ	YI SYLLABLE SU	su
U+A321	ꌡ	YI SYLLABLE SUP	sup
U+A322	ꌢ	YI SYLLABLE SURX	surx
U+A323	ꌣ	YI SYLLABLE SUR	sur
U+A324	ꌤ	YI SYLLABLE SYT	syt
U+A325	ꌥ	YI SYLLABLE SYX	syx
U+A326	ꌦ	YI SYLLABLE SY	sy
U+A327	ꌧ	YI SYLLABLE SYP	syp
U+A328	ꌨ	YI SYLLABLE SYRX	syrx
U+A329	ꌩ	YI SYLLABLE SYR	syr
U+A32A	ꌪ	YI SYLLABLE SSIT	ssit
U+A32B	ꌫ	YI SYLLABLE SSIX	ssix
U+A32C	ꌬ	YI SYLLABLE SSI	ssi
U+A32D	ꌭ	YI SYLLABLE SSIP	ssip
U+A32E	ꌮ	YI SYLLABLE SSIEX	ssiex
U+A32F	ꌯ	YI SYLLABLE SSIE	ssie
U+A330	ꌰ	YI SYLLABLE SSIEP	ssiep
U+A331	ꌱ	YI SYLLABLE SSAT	ssat
U+A332	ꌲ	YI SYLLABLE SSAX	ssax
U+A333	ꌳ	YI SYLLABLE SSA	ssa
U+A334	ꌴ	YI SYLLABLE SSAP	ssap
U+A335	ꌵ	YI SYLLABLE SSOT	ssot
U+A336	ꌶ	YI SYLLABLE SSOX	ssox
U+A337	ꌷ	YI SYLLABLE SSO	sso
U+A338	ꌸ	YI SYLLABLE SSOP	ssop
U+A339	ꌹ	YI SYLLABLE SSEX	ssex
U+A33A	ꌺ	YI SYLLABLE SSE	sse
U+A33B	ꌻ	YI SYLLABLE SSEP	ssep
U+A33C	ꌼ	YI SYLLABLE SSUT	ssut
U+A33D	ꌽ	YI SYLLABLE SSUX	ssux
U+A33E	ꌾ	YI SYLLABLE SSU	ssu
U+A33F	ꌿ	YI SYLLABLE SSUP	ssup
U+A340	ꍀ	YI SYLLABLE SSYT	ssyt
U+A341	ꍁ	YI SYLLABLE SSYX	ssyx
U+A342	ꍂ	YI SYLLABLE SSY	ssy
U+A343	ꍃ	YI SYLLABLE SSYP	ssyp
U+A344	ꍄ	YI SYLLABLE SSYRX	ssyrx
U+A345	ꍅ	YI SYLLABLE SSYR	ssyr
U+A346	ꍆ	YI SYLLABLE ZHAT	zhat
U+A347	ꍇ	YI SYLLABLE ZHAX	zhax
U+A348	ꍈ	YI SYLLABLE ZHA	zha
U+A349	ꍉ	YI SYLLABLE ZHAP	zhap
U+A34A	ꍊ	YI SYLLABLE ZHUOX	zhuox
U+A34B	ꍋ	YI SYLLABLE ZHUO	zhuo
U+A34C	ꍌ	YI SYLLABLE ZHUOP	zhuop
U+A34D	ꍍ	YI SYLLABLE ZHOT	zhot
U+A34E	ꍎ	YI SYLLABLE ZHOX	zhox
U+A34F	ꍏ	YI SYLLABLE ZHO	zho
U+A350	ꍐ	YI SYLLABLE ZHOP	zhop
U+A351	ꍑ	YI SYLLABLE ZHET	zhet
U+A352	ꍒ	YI SYLLABLE ZHEX	zhex
U+A353	ꍓ	YI SYLLABLE ZHE	zhe
U+A354	ꍔ	YI SYLLABLE ZHEP	zhep
U+A355	ꍕ	YI SYLLABLE ZHUT	zhut
U+A356	ꍖ	YI SYLLABLE ZHUX	zhux
U+A357	ꍗ	YI SYLLABLE ZHU	zhu
U+A358	ꍘ	YI SYLLABLE ZHUP	zhup
U+A359	ꍙ	YI SYLLABLE ZHURX	zhurx
U+A35A	ꍚ	YI SYLLABLE ZHUR	zhur
U+A35B	ꍛ	YI SYLLABLE ZHYT	zhyt
U+A35C	ꍜ	YI SYLLABLE ZHYX	zhyx
U+A35D	ꍝ	YI SYLLABLE ZHY	zhy
U+A35E	ꍞ	YI SYLLABLE ZHYP	zhyp
U+A35F	ꍟ	YI SYLLABLE ZHYRX	zhyrx
U+A360	ꍠ	YI SYLLABLE ZHYR	zhyr
U+A361	ꍡ	YI SYLLABLE CHAT	chat
U+A362	ꍢ	YI SYLLABLE CHAX	chax
U+A363	ꍣ	YI SYLLABLE CHA	cha
U+A364	ꍤ	YI SYLLABLE CHAP	chap
U+A365	ꍥ	YI SYLLABLE CHUOT	chuot
U+A366	ꍦ	YI SYLLABLE CHUOX	chuox
U+A367	ꍧ	YI SYLLABLE CHUO	chuo
U+A368	ꍨ	YI SYLLABLE CHUOP	chuop
U+A369	ꍩ	YI SYLLABLE CHOT	chot
U+A36A	ꍪ	YI SYLLABLE CHOX	chox
U+A36B	ꍫ	YI SYLLABLE CHO	cho
U+A36C	ꍬ	YI SYLLABLE CHOP	chop
U+A36D	ꍭ	YI SYLLABLE CHET	chet
U+A36E	ꍮ	YI SYLLABLE CHEX	chex
U+A36F	ꍯ	YI SYLLABLE CHE	che
U+A370	ꍰ	YI SYLLABLE CHEP	chep
U+A371	ꍱ	YI SYLLABLE CHUX	chux
U+A372	ꍲ	YI SYLLABLE CHU	chu
U+A373	ꍳ	YI SYLLABLE CHUP	chup
U+A374	ꍴ	YI SYLLABLE CHURX	churx
U+A375	ꍵ	YI SYLLABLE CHUR	chur
U+A376	ꍶ	YI SYLLABLE CHYT	chyt
U+A377	ꍷ	YI SYLLABLE CHYX	chyx
U+A378	ꍸ	YI SYLLABLE CHY	chy
U+A379	ꍹ	YI SYLLABLE CHYP	chyp
U+A37A	ꍺ	YI SYLLABLE CHYRX	chyrx
U+A37B	ꍻ	YI SYLLABLE CHYR	chyr
U+A37C	ꍼ	YI SYLLABLE RRAX	rrax
U+A37D	ꍽ	YI SYLLABLE RRA	rra
U+A37E	ꍾ	YI SYLLABLE RRUOX	rruox
U+A37F	ꍿ	YI SYLLABLE RRUO	rruo
U+A380	ꎀ	YI SYLLABLE RROT	rrot
U+A381	ꎁ	YI SYLLABLE RROX	rrox
U+A382	ꎂ	YI SYLLABLE RRO	rro
U+A383	ꎃ	YI SYLLABLE RROP	rrop
U+A384	ꎄ	YI SYLLABLE RRET	rret
U+A385	ꎅ	YI SYLLABLE RREX	rrex
U+A386	ꎆ	YI SYLLABLE RRE	rre
U+A387	ꎇ	YI SYLLABLE RREP	rrep
U+A388	ꎈ	YI SYLLABLE RRUT	rrut
U+A389	ꎉ	YI SYLLABLE RRUX	rrux
U+A38A	ꎊ	YI SYLLABLE RRU	rru
U+A38B	ꎋ	YI SYLLABLE RRUP	rrup
U+A38C	ꎌ	YI SYLLABLE RRURX	rrurx
U+A38D	ꎍ	YI SYLLABLE RRUR	rrur
U+A38E	ꎎ	YI SYLLABLE RRYT	rryt
U+A38F	ꎏ	YI SYLLABLE RRYX	rryx
U+A390	ꎐ	YI SYLLABLE RRY	rry
U+A391	ꎑ	YI SYLLABLE RRYP	rryp
U+A392	ꎒ	YI SYLLABLE RRYRX	rryrx
U+A393	ꎓ	YI SYLLABLE RRYR	rryr
U+A394	ꎔ	YI SYLLABLE NRAT	nrat
U+A395	ꎕ	YI SYLLABLE NRAX	nrax
U+A396	ꎖ	YI SYLLABLE NRA	nra
U+A397	ꎗ	YI SYLLABLE NRAP	nrap
U+A398	ꎘ	YI SYLLABLE NROX	nrox
U+A399	ꎙ	YI SYLLABLE NRO	nro
U+A39A	ꎚ	YI SYLLABLE NROP	nrop
U+A39B	ꎛ	YI SYLLABLE NRET	nret
U+A39C	ꎜ	YI SYLLABLE NREX	nrex
U+A39D	ꎝ	YI SYLLABLE NRE	nre
U+A39E	ꎞ	YI SYLLABLE NREP	nrep
U+A39F	ꎟ	YI SYLLABLE NRUT	nrut
U+A3A0	ꎠ	YI SYLLABLE NRUX	nrux
U+A3A1	ꎡ	YI SYLLABLE NRU	nru
U+A3A2	ꎢ	YI SYLLABLE NRUP	nrup
U+A3A3	ꎣ	YI SYLLABLE NRURX	nrurx
U+A3A4	ꎤ	YI SYLLABLE NRUR	nrur
U+A3A5	ꎥ	YI SYLLABLE NRYT	nryt
U+A3A6	ꎦ	YI SYLLABLE NRYX	nryx
U+A3A7	ꎧ	YI SYLLABLE NRY	nry
U+A3A8	ꎨ	YI SYLLABLE NRYP	nryp
U+A3A9	ꎩ	YI SYLLABLE NRYRX	nryrx
U+A3AA	ꎪ	YI SYLLABLE NRYR	nryr
U+A3AB	ꎫ	YI SYLLABLE SHAT	shat
U+A3AC	ꎬ	YI SYLLABLE SHAX	shax
U+A3AD	ꎭ	YI SYLLABLE SHA	sha
U+A3AE	ꎮ	YI SYLLABLE SHAP	shap
U+A3AF	ꎯ	YI SYLLABLE SHUOX	shuox
U+A3B0	ꎰ	YI SYLLABLE SHUO	shuo
U+A3B1	ꎱ	YI SYLLABLE SHUOP	shuop
U+A3B2	ꎲ	YI SYLLABLE SHOT	shot
U+A3B3	ꎳ	YI SYLLABLE SHOX	shox
U+A3B4	ꎴ	YI SYLLABLE SHO	sho
U+A3B5	ꎵ	YI SYLLABLE SHOP	shop
U+A3B6	ꎶ	YI SYLLABLE SHET	shet
U+A3B7	ꎷ	YI SYLLABLE SHEX	shex
U+A3B8	ꎸ	YI SYLLABLE SHE	she
U+A3B9	ꎹ	YI SYLLABLE SHEP	shep
U+A3BA	ꎺ	YI SYLLABLE SHUT	shut
U+A3BB	ꎻ	YI SYLLABLE SHUX	shux
U+A3BC	ꎼ	YI SYLLABLE SHU	shu
U+A3BD	ꎽ	YI SYLLABLE SHUP	shup
U+A3BE	ꎾ	YI SYLLABLE SHURX	shurx
U+A3BF	ꎿ	YI SYLLABLE SHUR	shur
U+A3C0	ꏀ	YI SYLLABLE SHYT	shyt
U+A3C1	ꏁ	YI SYLLABLE SHYX	shyx
U+A3C2	ꏂ	YI SYLLABLE SHY	shy
U+A3C3	ꏃ	YI SYLLABLE SHYP	shyp
U+A3C4	ꏄ	YI SYLLABLE SHYRX	shyrx
U+A3C5	ꏅ	YI SYLLABLE SHYR	shyr
U+A3C6	ꏆ	YI SYLLABLE RAT	rat
U+A3C7	ꏇ	YI SYLLABLE RAX	rax
U+A3C8	ꏈ	YI SYLLABLE RA	ra
U+A3C9	ꏉ	YI SYLLABLE RAP	rap
U+A3CA	ꏊ	YI SYLLABLE RUOX	ruox
U+A3CB	ꏋ	YI SYLLABLE RUO	ruo
U+A3CC	ꏌ	YI SYLLABLE RUOP	ruop
U+A3CD	ꏍ	YI SYLLABLE ROT	rot
U+A3CE	ꏎ	YI SYLLABLE ROX	rox
U+A3CF	ꏏ	YI SYLLABLE RO	ro
U+A3D0	ꏐ	YI SYLLABLE ROP	rop
U+A3D1	ꏑ	YI SYLLABLE REX	rex
U+A3D2	ꏒ	YI SYLLABLE RE	re
U+A3D3	ꏓ	YI SYLLABLE REP	rep
U+A3D4	ꏔ	YI SYLLABLE RUT	rut
U+A3D5	ꏕ	YI SYLLABLE RUX	rux
U+A3D6	ꏖ	YI SYLLABLE RU	ru
U+A3D7	ꏗ	YI SYLLABLE RUP	rup
U+A3D8	ꏘ	YI SYLLABLE RURX	rurx
U+A3D9	ꏙ	YI SYLLABLE RUR	rur
U+A3DA	ꏚ	YI SYLLABLE RYT	ryt
U+A3DB	ꏛ	YI SYLLABLE RYX	ryx
U+A3DC	ꏜ	YI SYLLABLE RY	ry
U+A3DD	ꏝ	YI SYLLABLE RYP	ryp
U+A3DE	ꏞ	YI SYLLABLE RYRX	ryrx
U+A3DF	ꏟ	YI SYLLABLE RYR	ryr
U+A3E0	ꏠ	YI SYLLABLE JIT	jit
U+A3E1	ꏡ	YI SYLLABLE JIX	jix
U+A3E2	ꏢ	YI SYLLABLE JI	ji
U+A3E3	ꏣ	YI SYLLABLE JIP	jip
U+A3E4	ꏤ	YI SYLLABLE JIET	jiet
U+A3E5	ꏥ	YI SYLLABLE JIEX	jiex
U+A3E6	ꏦ	YI SYLLABLE JIE	jie
U+A3E7	ꏧ	YI SYLLABLE JIEP	jiep
U+A3E8	ꏨ	YI SYLLABLE JUOT	juot
U+A3E9	ꏩ	YI SYLLABLE JUOX	juox
U+A3EA	ꏪ	YI SYLLABLE JUO	juo
U+A3EB	ꏫ	YI SYLLABLE JUOP	juop
U+A3EC	ꏬ	YI SYLLABLE JOT	jot
U+A3ED	ꏭ	YI SYLLABLE JOX	jox
U+A3EE	ꏮ	YI SYLLABLE JO	jo
U+A3EF	ꏯ	YI SYLLABLE JOP	jop
U+A3F0	ꏰ	YI SYLLABLE JUT	jut
U+A3F1	ꏱ	YI SYLLABLE JUX	jux
U+A3F2	ꏲ	YI SYLLABLE JU	ju
U+A3F3	ꏳ	YI SYLLABLE JUP	jup
U+A3F4	ꏴ	YI SYLLABLE JURX	jurx
U+A3F5	ꏵ	YI SYLLABLE JUR	jur
U+A3F6	ꏶ	YI SYLLABLE JYT	jyt
U+A3F7	ꏷ	YI SYLLABLE JYX	jyx
U+A3F8	ꏸ	YI SYLLABLE JY	jy
U+A3F9	ꏹ	YI SYLLABLE JYP	jyp
U+A3FA	ꏺ	YI SYLLABLE JYRX	jyrx
U+A3FB	ꏻ	YI SYLLABLE JYR	jyr
U+A3FC	ꏼ	YI SYLLABLE QIT	qit
U+A3FD	ꏽ	YI SYLLABLE QIX	qix
U+A3FE	ꏾ	YI SYLLABLE QI	qi
U+A3FF	ꏿ	YI SYLLABLE QIP	qip
U+A400	ꐀ	YI SYLLABLE QIET	qiet
U+A401	ꐁ	YI SYLLABLE QIEX	qiex
U+A402	ꐂ	YI SYLLABLE QIE	qie
U+A403	ꐃ	YI SYLLABLE QIEP	qiep
U+A404	ꐄ	YI SYLLABLE QUOT	quot
U+A405	ꐅ	YI SYLLABLE QUOX	quox
U+A406	ꐆ	YI SYLLABLE QUO	quo
U+A407	ꐇ	YI SYLLABLE QUOP	quop
U+A408	ꐈ	YI SYLLABLE QOT	qot
U+A409	ꐉ	YI SYLLABLE QOX	qox
U+A40A	ꐊ	YI SYLLABLE QO	qo
U+A40B	ꐋ	YI SYLLABLE QOP	qop
U+A40C	ꐌ	YI SYLLABLE QUT	qut
U+A40D	ꐍ	YI SYLLABLE QUX	qux
U+A40E	ꐎ	YI SYLLABLE QU	qu
U+A40F	ꐏ	YI SYLLABLE QUP	qup
U+A410	ꐐ	YI SYLLABLE QURX	qurx
U+A411	ꐑ	YI SYLLABLE QUR	qur
U+A412	ꐒ	YI SYLLABLE QYT	qyt
U+A413	ꐓ	YI SYLLABLE QYX	qyx
U+A414	ꐔ	YI SYLLABLE QY	qy
U+A415	ꐕ	YI SYLLABLE QYP	qyp
U+A416	ꐖ	YI SYLLABLE QYRX	qyrx
U+A417	ꐗ	YI SYLLABLE QYR	qyr
U+A418	ꐘ	YI SYLLABLE JJIT	jjit
U+A419	ꐙ	YI SYLLABLE JJIX	jjix
U+A41A	ꐚ	YI SYLLABLE JJI	jji
U+A41B	ꐛ	YI SYLLABLE JJIP	jjip
U+A41C	ꐜ	YI SYLLABLE JJIET	jjiet
U+A41D	ꐝ	YI SYLLABLE JJIEX	jjiex
U+A41E	ꐞ	YI SYLLABLE JJIE	jjie
U+A41F	ꐟ	YI SYLLABLE JJIEP	jjiep
U+A420	ꐠ	YI SYLLABLE JJUOX	jjuox
U+A421	ꐡ	YI SYLLABLE JJUO	jjuo
U+A422	ꐢ	YI SYLLABLE JJUOP	jjuop
U+A423	ꐣ	YI SYLLABLE JJOT	jjot
U+A424	ꐤ	YI SYLLABLE JJOX	jjox
U+A425	ꐥ	YI SYLLABLE JJO	jjo
U+A426	ꐦ	YI SYLLABLE JJOP	jjop
U+A427	ꐧ	YI SYLLABLE JJUT	jjut
U+A428	ꐨ	YI SYLLABLE JJUX	jjux
U+A429	ꐩ	YI SYLLABLE JJU	jju
U+A42A	ꐪ	YI SYLLABLE JJUP	jjup
U+A42B	ꐫ	YI SYLLABLE JJURX	jjurx
U+A42C	ꐬ	YI SYLLABLE JJUR	jjur
U+A42D	ꐭ	YI SYLLABLE JJYT	jjyt
U+A42E	ꐮ	YI SYLLABLE JJYX	jjyx
U+A42F	ꐯ	YI SYLLABLE JJY	jjy
U+A430	ꐰ	YI SYLLABLE JJYP	jjyp
U+A431	ꐱ	YI SYLLABLE NJIT	njit
U+A432	ꐲ	YI SYLLABLE NJIX	njix
U+A433	ꐳ	YI SYLLABLE NJI	nji
U+A434	ꐴ	YI SYLLABLE NJIP	njip
U+A435	ꐵ	YI SYLLABLE NJIET	njiet
U+A436	ꐶ	YI SYLLABLE NJIEX	njiex
U+A437	ꐷ	YI SYLLABLE NJIE	njie
U+A438	ꐸ	YI SYLLABLE NJIEP	njiep
U+A439	ꐹ	YI SYLLABLE NJUOX	njuox
U+A43A	ꐺ	YI SYLLABLE NJUO	njuo
U+A43B	ꐻ	YI SYLLABLE NJOT	njot
U+A43C	ꐼ	YI SYLLABLE NJOX	njox
U+A43D	ꐽ	YI SYLLABLE NJO	njo
U+A43E	ꐾ	YI SYLLABLE NJOP	njop
U+A43F	ꐿ	YI SYLLABLE NJUX	njux
U+A440	ꑀ	YI SYLLABLE NJU	nju
U+A441	ꑁ	YI SYLLABLE NJUP	njup
U+A442	ꑂ	YI SYLLABLE NJURX	njurx
U+A443	ꑃ	YI SYLLABLE NJUR	njur
U+A444	ꑄ	YI SYLLABLE NJYT	njyt
U+A445	ꑅ	YI SYLLABLE NJYX	njyx
U+A446	ꑆ	YI SYLLABLE NJY	njy
U+A447	ꑇ	YI SYLLABLE NJYP	njyp
U+A448	ꑈ	YI SYLLABLE NJYRX	njyrx
U+A449	ꑉ	YI SYLLABLE NJYR	njyr
U+A44A	ꑊ	YI SYLLABLE NYIT	nyit
U+A44B	ꑋ	YI SYLLABLE NYIX	nyix
U+A44C	ꑌ	YI SYLLABLE NYI	nyi
U+A44D	ꑍ	YI SYLLABLE NYIP	nyip
U+A44E	ꑎ	YI SYLLABLE NYIET	nyiet
U+A44F	ꑏ	YI SYLLABLE NYIEX	nyiex
U+A450	ꑐ	YI SYLLABLE NYIE	nyie
U+A451	ꑑ	YI SYLLABLE NYIEP	nyiep
U+A452	ꑒ	YI SYLLABLE NYUOX	nyuox
U+A453	ꑓ	YI SYLLABLE NYUO	nyuo
U+A454	ꑔ	YI SYLLABLE NYUOP	nyuop
U+A455	ꑕ	YI SYLLABLE NYOT	nyot
U+A456	ꑖ	YI SYLLABLE NYOX	nyox
U+A457	ꑗ	YI SYLLABLE NYO	nyo
U+A458	ꑘ	YI SYLLABLE NYOP	nyop
U+A459	ꑙ	YI SYLLABLE NYUT	nyut
U+A45A	ꑚ	YI SYLLABLE NYUX	nyux
U+A45B	ꑛ	YI SYLLABLE NYU	nyu
U+A45C	ꑜ	YI SYLLABLE NYUP	nyup
U+A45D	ꑝ	YI SYLLABLE XIT	xit
U+A45E	ꑞ	YI SYLLABLE XIX	xix
U+A45F	ꑟ	YI SYLLABLE XI	xi
U+A460	ꑠ	YI SYLLABLE XIP	xip
U+A461	ꑡ	YI SYLLABLE XIET	xiet
U+A462	ꑢ	YI SYLLABLE XIEX	xiex
U+A463	ꑣ	YI SYLLABLE XIE	xie
U+A464	ꑤ	YI SYLLABLE XIEP	xiep
U+A465	ꑥ	YI SYLLABLE XUOX	xuox
U+A466	ꑦ	YI SYLLABLE XUO	xuo
U+A467	ꑧ	YI SYLLABLE XOT	xot
U+A468	ꑨ	YI SYLLABLE XOX	xox
U+A469	ꑩ	YI SYLLABLE XO	xo
U+A46A	ꑪ	YI SYLLABLE XOP	xop
U+A46B	ꑫ	YI SYLLABLE XYT	xyt
U+A46C	ꑬ	YI SYLLABLE XYX	xyx
U+A46D	ꑭ	YI SYLLABLE XY	xy
U+A46E	ꑮ	YI SYLLABLE XYP	xyp
U+A46F	ꑯ	YI SYLLABLE XYRX	xyrx
U+A470	ꑰ	YI SYLLABLE XYR	xyr
U+A471	ꑱ	YI SYLLABLE YIT	yit
U+A472	ꑲ	YI SYLLABLE YIX	yix
U+A473	ꑳ	YI SYLLABLE YI	yi
U+A474	ꑴ	YI SYLLABLE YIP	yip
U+A475	ꑵ	YI SYLLABLE YIET	yiet
U+A476	ꑶ	YI SYLLABLE YIEX	yiex
U+A477	ꑷ	YI SYLLABLE YIE	yie
U+A478	ꑸ	YI SYLLABLE YIEP	yiep
U+A479	ꑹ	YI SYLLABLE YUOT	yuot
U+A47A	ꑺ	YI SYLLABLE YUOX	yuox
U+A47B	ꑻ	YI SYLLABLE YUO	yuo
U+A47C	ꑼ	YI SYLLABLE YUOP	yuop
U+A47D	ꑽ	YI SYLLABLE YOT	yot
U+A47E	ꑾ	YI SYLLABLE YOX	yox
U+A47F	ꑿ	YI SYLLABLE YO	yo
U+A480	ꒀ	YI SYLLABLE YOP	yop
U+A481	ꒁ	YI SYLLABLE YUT	yut
U+A482	ꒂ	YI SYLLABLE YUX	yux
U+A483	ꒃ	YI SYLLABLE YU	yu
U+A484	ꒄ	YI SYLLABLE YUP	yup
U+A485	ꒅ	YI SYLLABLE YURX	yurx
U+A486	ꒆ	YI SYLLABLE YUR	yur
U+A487	ꒇ	YI SYLLABLE YYT	yyt
U+A488	ꒈ	YI SYLLABLE YYX	yyx
U+A489	ꒉ	YI SYLLABLE YY	yy
U+A48A	ꒊ	YI SYLLABLE YYP	yyp
U+A48B	ꒋ	YI SYLLABLE YYRX	yyrx
U+A48C	ꒌ	YI SYLLABLE YYR	yyr

Note that the name for U+A015 is a misnomer, as the character is actually a syllable iteration mark corresponding to "w" in standard Yi romanization. This error was not detected in the early phases of discussions for encoding the script and during the review even by Chinese members, because the character was not part of published syllabary charts but found only within some texts; the Pinyin romanization 'wu' was found only when citing the sign isolately, but in Mandarin reading, the Pinyin 'wu' is just reads as a long 'u', which would be confusive with the distinct Yi syllable encoded for 'u' alone, keeping the 'w' silent as a null consonant, so its Yi Pinyin romanization is written as 'w' only). This error has been later acknowledged by Unicode, but only after the final release of Unicode 3.0. As the character names already standardized in the UCS encoding is a character property that is subject to the Unicode Standard Stability Policy and that cannot be changed, a clarifying annotation was added into the lists of name aliases of the Unicode character database and in the published character charts. With this clarification, the general category property for this character was also changed from 'Lo' (other letter, used by all other Yi syllabic letters) to 'Lm' (as a letter modifier) and given an additional "Extender" property (like U+3005 IDEOGRAPHIC ITERATION MARK): these properties are not normative but are documenting for the best known practices about character behaviors and usages.

== Block ==
Yi Syllables^{[1]}^{[2]} Official Unicode Consortium code chart (PDF)
	0	1	2	3	4	5	6	7	8	9	A	B	C	D	E	F
U+A00x	ꀀ	ꀁ	ꀂ	ꀃ	ꀄ	ꀅ	ꀆ	ꀇ	ꀈ	ꀉ	ꀊ	ꀋ	ꀌ	ꀍ	ꀎ	ꀏ
U+A01x	ꀐ	ꀑ	ꀒ	ꀓ	ꀔ	ꀕ	ꀖ	ꀗ	ꀘ	ꀙ	ꀚ	ꀛ	ꀜ	ꀝ	ꀞ	ꀟ
U+A02x	ꀠ	ꀡ	ꀢ	ꀣ	ꀤ	ꀥ	ꀦ	ꀧ	ꀨ	ꀩ	ꀪ	ꀫ	ꀬ	ꀭ	ꀮ	ꀯ
U+A03x	ꀰ	ꀱ	ꀲ	ꀳ	ꀴ	ꀵ	ꀶ	ꀷ	ꀸ	ꀹ	ꀺ	ꀻ	ꀼ	ꀽ	ꀾ	ꀿ
U+A04x	ꁀ	ꁁ	ꁂ	ꁃ	ꁄ	ꁅ	ꁆ	ꁇ	ꁈ	ꁉ	ꁊ	ꁋ	ꁌ	ꁍ	ꁎ	ꁏ
U+A05x	ꁐ	ꁑ	ꁒ	ꁓ	ꁔ	ꁕ	ꁖ	ꁗ	ꁘ	ꁙ	ꁚ	ꁛ	ꁜ	ꁝ	ꁞ	ꁟ
U+A06x	ꁠ	ꁡ	ꁢ	ꁣ	ꁤ	ꁥ	ꁦ	ꁧ	ꁨ	ꁩ	ꁪ	ꁫ	ꁬ	ꁭ	ꁮ	ꁯ
U+A07x	ꁰ	ꁱ	ꁲ	ꁳ	ꁴ	ꁵ	ꁶ	ꁷ	ꁸ	ꁹ	ꁺ	ꁻ	ꁼ	ꁽ	ꁾ	ꁿ
U+A08x	ꂀ	ꂁ	ꂂ	ꂃ	ꂄ	ꂅ	ꂆ	ꂇ	ꂈ	ꂉ	ꂊ	ꂋ	ꂌ	ꂍ	ꂎ	ꂏ
U+A09x	ꂐ	ꂑ	ꂒ	ꂓ	ꂔ	ꂕ	ꂖ	ꂗ	ꂘ	ꂙ	ꂚ	ꂛ	ꂜ	ꂝ	ꂞ	ꂟ
U+A0Ax	ꂠ	ꂡ	ꂢ	ꂣ	ꂤ	ꂥ	ꂦ	ꂧ	ꂨ	ꂩ	ꂪ	ꂫ	ꂬ	ꂭ	ꂮ	ꂯ
U+A0Bx	ꂰ	ꂱ	ꂲ	ꂳ	ꂴ	ꂵ	ꂶ	ꂷ	ꂸ	ꂹ	ꂺ	ꂻ	ꂼ	ꂽ	ꂾ	ꂿ
U+A0Cx	ꃀ	ꃁ	ꃂ	ꃃ	ꃄ	ꃅ	ꃆ	ꃇ	ꃈ	ꃉ	ꃊ	ꃋ	ꃌ	ꃍ	ꃎ	ꃏ
U+A0Dx	ꃐ	ꃑ	ꃒ	ꃓ	ꃔ	ꃕ	ꃖ	ꃗ	ꃘ	ꃙ	ꃚ	ꃛ	ꃜ	ꃝ	ꃞ	ꃟ
U+A0Ex	ꃠ	ꃡ	ꃢ	ꃣ	ꃤ	ꃥ	ꃦ	ꃧ	ꃨ	ꃩ	ꃪ	ꃫ	ꃬ	ꃭ	ꃮ	ꃯ
U+A0Fx	ꃰ	ꃱ	ꃲ	ꃳ	ꃴ	ꃵ	ꃶ	ꃷ	ꃸ	ꃹ	ꃺ	ꃻ	ꃼ	ꃽ	ꃾ	ꃿ
U+A10x	ꄀ	ꄁ	ꄂ	ꄃ	ꄄ	ꄅ	ꄆ	ꄇ	ꄈ	ꄉ	ꄊ	ꄋ	ꄌ	ꄍ	ꄎ	ꄏ
U+A11x	ꄐ	ꄑ	ꄒ	ꄓ	ꄔ	ꄕ	ꄖ	ꄗ	ꄘ	ꄙ	ꄚ	ꄛ	ꄜ	ꄝ	ꄞ	ꄟ
U+A12x	ꄠ	ꄡ	ꄢ	ꄣ	ꄤ	ꄥ	ꄦ	ꄧ	ꄨ	ꄩ	ꄪ	ꄫ	ꄬ	ꄭ	ꄮ	ꄯ
U+A13x	ꄰ	ꄱ	ꄲ	ꄳ	ꄴ	ꄵ	ꄶ	ꄷ	ꄸ	ꄹ	ꄺ	ꄻ	ꄼ	ꄽ	ꄾ	ꄿ
U+A14x	ꅀ	ꅁ	ꅂ	ꅃ	ꅄ	ꅅ	ꅆ	ꅇ	ꅈ	ꅉ	ꅊ	ꅋ	ꅌ	ꅍ	ꅎ	ꅏ
U+A15x	ꅐ	ꅑ	ꅒ	ꅓ	ꅔ	ꅕ	ꅖ	ꅗ	ꅘ	ꅙ	ꅚ	ꅛ	ꅜ	ꅝ	ꅞ	ꅟ
U+A16x	ꅠ	ꅡ	ꅢ	ꅣ	ꅤ	ꅥ	ꅦ	ꅧ	ꅨ	ꅩ	ꅪ	ꅫ	ꅬ	ꅭ	ꅮ	ꅯ
U+A17x	ꅰ	ꅱ	ꅲ	ꅳ	ꅴ	ꅵ	ꅶ	ꅷ	ꅸ	ꅹ	ꅺ	ꅻ	ꅼ	ꅽ	ꅾ	ꅿ
U+A18x	ꆀ	ꆁ	ꆂ	ꆃ	ꆄ	ꆅ	ꆆ	ꆇ	ꆈ	ꆉ	ꆊ	ꆋ	ꆌ	ꆍ	ꆎ	ꆏ
U+A19x	ꆐ	ꆑ	ꆒ	ꆓ	ꆔ	ꆕ	ꆖ	ꆗ	ꆘ	ꆙ	ꆚ	ꆛ	ꆜ	ꆝ	ꆞ	ꆟ
U+A1Ax	ꆠ	ꆡ	ꆢ	ꆣ	ꆤ	ꆥ	ꆦ	ꆧ	ꆨ	ꆩ	ꆪ	ꆫ	ꆬ	ꆭ	ꆮ	ꆯ
U+A1Bx	ꆰ	ꆱ	ꆲ	ꆳ	ꆴ	ꆵ	ꆶ	ꆷ	ꆸ	ꆹ	ꆺ	ꆻ	ꆼ	ꆽ	ꆾ	ꆿ
U+A1Cx	ꇀ	ꇁ	ꇂ	ꇃ	ꇄ	ꇅ	ꇆ	ꇇ	ꇈ	ꇉ	ꇊ	ꇋ	ꇌ	ꇍ	ꇎ	ꇏ
U+A1Dx	ꇐ	ꇑ	ꇒ	ꇓ	ꇔ	ꇕ	ꇖ	ꇗ	ꇘ	ꇙ	ꇚ	ꇛ	ꇜ	ꇝ	ꇞ	ꇟ
U+A1Ex	ꇠ	ꇡ	ꇢ	ꇣ	ꇤ	ꇥ	ꇦ	ꇧ	ꇨ	ꇩ	ꇪ	ꇫ	ꇬ	ꇭ	ꇮ	ꇯ
U+A1Fx	ꇰ	ꇱ	ꇲ	ꇳ	ꇴ	ꇵ	ꇶ	ꇷ	ꇸ	ꇹ	ꇺ	ꇻ	ꇼ	ꇽ	ꇾ	ꇿ
U+A20x	ꈀ	ꈁ	ꈂ	ꈃ	ꈄ	ꈅ	ꈆ	ꈇ	ꈈ	ꈉ	ꈊ	ꈋ	ꈌ	ꈍ	ꈎ	ꈏ
U+A21x	ꈐ	ꈑ	ꈒ	ꈓ	ꈔ	ꈕ	ꈖ	ꈗ	ꈘ	ꈙ	ꈚ	ꈛ	ꈜ	ꈝ	ꈞ	ꈟ
U+A22x	ꈠ	ꈡ	ꈢ	ꈣ	ꈤ	ꈥ	ꈦ	ꈧ	ꈨ	ꈩ	ꈪ	ꈫ	ꈬ	ꈭ	ꈮ	ꈯ
U+A23x	ꈰ	ꈱ	ꈲ	ꈳ	ꈴ	ꈵ	ꈶ	ꈷ	ꈸ	ꈹ	ꈺ	ꈻ	ꈼ	ꈽ	ꈾ	ꈿ
U+A24x	ꉀ	ꉁ	ꉂ	ꉃ	ꉄ	ꉅ	ꉆ	ꉇ	ꉈ	ꉉ	ꉊ	ꉋ	ꉌ	ꉍ	ꉎ	ꉏ
U+A25x	ꉐ	ꉑ	ꉒ	ꉓ	ꉔ	ꉕ	ꉖ	ꉗ	ꉘ	ꉙ	ꉚ	ꉛ	ꉜ	ꉝ	ꉞ	ꉟ
U+A26x	ꉠ	ꉡ	ꉢ	ꉣ	ꉤ	ꉥ	ꉦ	ꉧ	ꉨ	ꉩ	ꉪ	ꉫ	ꉬ	ꉭ	ꉮ	ꉯ
U+A27x	ꉰ	ꉱ	ꉲ	ꉳ	ꉴ	ꉵ	ꉶ	ꉷ	ꉸ	ꉹ	ꉺ	ꉻ	ꉼ	ꉽ	ꉾ	ꉿ
U+A28x	ꊀ	ꊁ	ꊂ	ꊃ	ꊄ	ꊅ	ꊆ	ꊇ	ꊈ	ꊉ	ꊊ	ꊋ	ꊌ	ꊍ	ꊎ	ꊏ
U+A29x	ꊐ	ꊑ	ꊒ	ꊓ	ꊔ	ꊕ	ꊖ	ꊗ	ꊘ	ꊙ	ꊚ	ꊛ	ꊜ	ꊝ	ꊞ	ꊟ
U+A2Ax	ꊠ	ꊡ	ꊢ	ꊣ	ꊤ	ꊥ	ꊦ	ꊧ	ꊨ	ꊩ	ꊪ	ꊫ	ꊬ	ꊭ	ꊮ	ꊯ
U+A2Bx	ꊰ	ꊱ	ꊲ	ꊳ	ꊴ	ꊵ	ꊶ	ꊷ	ꊸ	ꊹ	ꊺ	ꊻ	ꊼ	ꊽ	ꊾ	ꊿ
U+A2Cx	ꋀ	ꋁ	ꋂ	ꋃ	ꋄ	ꋅ	ꋆ	ꋇ	ꋈ	ꋉ	ꋊ	ꋋ	ꋌ	ꋍ	ꋎ	ꋏ
U+A2Dx	ꋐ	ꋑ	ꋒ	ꋓ	ꋔ	ꋕ	ꋖ	ꋗ	ꋘ	ꋙ	ꋚ	ꋛ	ꋜ	ꋝ	ꋞ	ꋟ
U+A2Ex	ꋠ	ꋡ	ꋢ	ꋣ	ꋤ	ꋥ	ꋦ	ꋧ	ꋨ	ꋩ	ꋪ	ꋫ	ꋬ	ꋭ	ꋮ	ꋯ
U+A2Fx	ꋰ	ꋱ	ꋲ	ꋳ	ꋴ	ꋵ	ꋶ	ꋷ	ꋸ	ꋹ	ꋺ	ꋻ	ꋼ	ꋽ	ꋾ	ꋿ
U+A30x	ꌀ	ꌁ	ꌂ	ꌃ	ꌄ	ꌅ	ꌆ	ꌇ	ꌈ	ꌉ	ꌊ	ꌋ	ꌌ	ꌍ	ꌎ	ꌏ
U+A31x	ꌐ	ꌑ	ꌒ	ꌓ	ꌔ	ꌕ	ꌖ	ꌗ	ꌘ	ꌙ	ꌚ	ꌛ	ꌜ	ꌝ	ꌞ	ꌟ
U+A32x	ꌠ	ꌡ	ꌢ	ꌣ	ꌤ	ꌥ	ꌦ	ꌧ	ꌨ	ꌩ	ꌪ	ꌫ	ꌬ	ꌭ	ꌮ	ꌯ
U+A33x	ꌰ	ꌱ	ꌲ	ꌳ	ꌴ	ꌵ	ꌶ	ꌷ	ꌸ	ꌹ	ꌺ	ꌻ	ꌼ	ꌽ	ꌾ	ꌿ
U+A34x	ꍀ	ꍁ	ꍂ	ꍃ	ꍄ	ꍅ	ꍆ	ꍇ	ꍈ	ꍉ	ꍊ	ꍋ	ꍌ	ꍍ	ꍎ	ꍏ
U+A35x	ꍐ	ꍑ	ꍒ	ꍓ	ꍔ	ꍕ	ꍖ	ꍗ	ꍘ	ꍙ	ꍚ	ꍛ	ꍜ	ꍝ	ꍞ	ꍟ
U+A36x	ꍠ	ꍡ	ꍢ	ꍣ	ꍤ	ꍥ	ꍦ	ꍧ	ꍨ	ꍩ	ꍪ	ꍫ	ꍬ	ꍭ	ꍮ	ꍯ
U+A37x	ꍰ	ꍱ	ꍲ	ꍳ	ꍴ	ꍵ	ꍶ	ꍷ	ꍸ	ꍹ	ꍺ	ꍻ	ꍼ	ꍽ	ꍾ	ꍿ
U+A38x	ꎀ	ꎁ	ꎂ	ꎃ	ꎄ	ꎅ	ꎆ	ꎇ	ꎈ	ꎉ	ꎊ	ꎋ	ꎌ	ꎍ	ꎎ	ꎏ
U+A39x	ꎐ	ꎑ	ꎒ	ꎓ	ꎔ	ꎕ	ꎖ	ꎗ	ꎘ	ꎙ	ꎚ	ꎛ	ꎜ	ꎝ	ꎞ	ꎟ
U+A3Ax	ꎠ	ꎡ	ꎢ	ꎣ	ꎤ	ꎥ	ꎦ	ꎧ	ꎨ	ꎩ	ꎪ	ꎫ	ꎬ	ꎭ	ꎮ	ꎯ
U+A3Bx	ꎰ	ꎱ	ꎲ	ꎳ	ꎴ	ꎵ	ꎶ	ꎷ	ꎸ	ꎹ	ꎺ	ꎻ	ꎼ	ꎽ	ꎾ	ꎿ
U+A3Cx	ꏀ	ꏁ	ꏂ	ꏃ	ꏄ	ꏅ	ꏆ	ꏇ	ꏈ	ꏉ	ꏊ	ꏋ	ꏌ	ꏍ	ꏎ	ꏏ
U+A3Dx	ꏐ	ꏑ	ꏒ	ꏓ	ꏔ	ꏕ	ꏖ	ꏗ	ꏘ	ꏙ	ꏚ	ꏛ	ꏜ	ꏝ	ꏞ	ꏟ
U+A3Ex	ꏠ	ꏡ	ꏢ	ꏣ	ꏤ	ꏥ	ꏦ	ꏧ	ꏨ	ꏩ	ꏪ	ꏫ	ꏬ	ꏭ	ꏮ	ꏯ
U+A3Fx	ꏰ	ꏱ	ꏲ	ꏳ	ꏴ	ꏵ	ꏶ	ꏷ	ꏸ	ꏹ	ꏺ	ꏻ	ꏼ	ꏽ	ꏾ	ꏿ
U+A40x	ꐀ	ꐁ	ꐂ	ꐃ	ꐄ	ꐅ	ꐆ	ꐇ	ꐈ	ꐉ	ꐊ	ꐋ	ꐌ	ꐍ	ꐎ	ꐏ
U+A41x	ꐐ	ꐑ	ꐒ	ꐓ	ꐔ	ꐕ	ꐖ	ꐗ	ꐘ	ꐙ	ꐚ	ꐛ	ꐜ	ꐝ	ꐞ	ꐟ
U+A42x	ꐠ	ꐡ	ꐢ	ꐣ	ꐤ	ꐥ	ꐦ	ꐧ	ꐨ	ꐩ	ꐪ	ꐫ	ꐬ	ꐭ	ꐮ	ꐯ
U+A43x	ꐰ	ꐱ	ꐲ	ꐳ	ꐴ	ꐵ	ꐶ	ꐷ	ꐸ	ꐹ	ꐺ	ꐻ	ꐼ	ꐽ	ꐾ	ꐿ
U+A44x	ꑀ	ꑁ	ꑂ	ꑃ	ꑄ	ꑅ	ꑆ	ꑇ	ꑈ	ꑉ	ꑊ	ꑋ	ꑌ	ꑍ	ꑎ	ꑏ
U+A45x	ꑐ	ꑑ	ꑒ	ꑓ	ꑔ	ꑕ	ꑖ	ꑗ	ꑘ	ꑙ	ꑚ	ꑛ	ꑜ	ꑝ	ꑞ	ꑟ
U+A46x	ꑠ	ꑡ	ꑢ	ꑣ	ꑤ	ꑥ	ꑦ	ꑧ	ꑨ	ꑩ	ꑪ	ꑫ	ꑬ	ꑭ	ꑮ	ꑯ
U+A47x	ꑰ	ꑱ	ꑲ	ꑳ	ꑴ	ꑵ	ꑶ	ꑷ	ꑸ	ꑹ	ꑺ	ꑻ	ꑼ	ꑽ	ꑾ	ꑿ
U+A48x	ꒀ	ꒁ	ꒂ	ꒃ	ꒄ	ꒅ	ꒆ	ꒇ	ꒈ	ꒉ	ꒊ	ꒋ	ꒌ			
Notes: 1. As of Unicode version 17.0; 2. Grey areas indicate non-assigned code points

== History ==
The following Unicode-related documents record the purpose and process of defining specific characters in the Yi Syllables block:

Version	Final code points (Note: Proposed code points and characters names may differ from final code points and names)	Count	L2 ID	WG2 ID	Document
3.0	U+A000..A48C	1,165		N921R	China's requirements for extensions to the repertoire of ISO/IEC 10646.1, 1993-10-26
3.0	U+A000..A48C	1,165		N965	Proposal for encoding Yi script on BMP of ISO/IEC 10646, 1994-01-01
3.0	U+A000..A48C	1,165	X3L2/94-098	N1033 (pdf, doc)	Umamaheswaran, V. S.; Ksar, Mike (1994-06-01), Unconfirmed Minutes of ISO/IEC JTC 1/SC 2/WG 2 Meeting 25, Falez Hotel, Antalya, Turkey, 1994-04-18--22
3.0	U+A000..A48C	1,165		N1074	Ross, Hugh McGregor (1994-09-22), A Simple Way of Coding and Implementing the Yi Syllabary
3.0	U+A000..A48C	1,165	X3L2/96-098	N1187	Everson, Michael (1995-03-24), Encoding the Yi script
3.0	U+A000..A48C	1,165	X3L2/96-099	N1415	Proposal fo[r] Encoding Yi Script on BMP of ISO/IEC 10646, 1996-06-11
3.0	U+A000..A48C	1,165		N1453	Ksar, Mike; Umamaheswaran, V. S. (1996-12-06), WG 2 Minutes - Quebec Meeting 31
3.0	U+A000..A48C	1,165	X3L2/96-123		Aliprand, Joan; Winkler, Arnold (1996-12-18), "4.2 Yi script", Preliminary Minutes - UTC #71 & X3L2 #168 ad hoc meeting, San Diego - December 5-6, 1996
3.0	U+A000..A48C	1,165	L2/97-020	N1481	Yi script encoding, 1996-12-30
3.0	U+A000..A48C	1,165	L2/97-046	N1531	Mao, Yong Gang (1997-03-19), Proposed Yi code table and name list for pDAM
3.0	U+A000..A48C	1,165	L2/97-030	N1503 (pdf, doc)	Umamaheswaran, V. S.; Ksar, Mike (1997-04-01), "8.4.1 Yi syllabary", Unconfirmed Minutes of WG 2 Meeting #32, Singapore; 1997-01-20--24
3.0	U+A000..A48C	1,165	L2/97-153	N1608	Yi Script high quality text for p_DAM, 1997-06-20
3.0	U+A000..A48C	1,165	L2/97-288	N1603	Umamaheswaran, V. S. (1997-10-24), "8.8", Unconfirmed Meeting Minutes, WG 2 Meeting # 33, Heraklion, Crete, Greece, 20 June – 4 July 1997
3.0	U+A000..A48C	1,165	L2/98-142		Whistler, Ken (1998-04-15), Comments on Text for Yi PDAM # 14
3.0	U+A000..A48C	1,165		N1831	Paterson, Bruce (1998-04-15), PDAM14 - Yi Script
3.0	U+A000..A48C	1,165	L2/98-158		Aliprand, Joan; Winkler, Arnold (1998-05-26), "Yi PDAM 14", Draft Minutes – UTC #76 & NCITS Subgroup L2 #173 joint meeting, Tredyffrin, Pennsylvania, April 20-22, 1998
3.0	U+A000..A48C	1,165		N1814 (html, doc)	Revised Proposal for Yi Characters and Yi Radicals, 1998-07-26
3.0	U+A000..A48C	1,165		N1863	Explanation of WG2 N1814 (Yi), 1998-09-16
3.0	U+A000..A48C	1,165		N1890	Whistler, Ken; Everson, Michael; Chen, Zhuang (1998-09-23), Report of Yi ad hoc committee
3.0	U+A000..A48C	1,165		N1925	Disposition of Comments - PDAM14 - Yi - SC2 N3214, 1998-11-02
3.0	U+A000..A48C	1,165		N1926	Paterson, Bruce (1998-11-02), Text FPDAM 14 - Yi - SC2 N3215
3.0	U+A000..A48C	1,165	L2/99-010	N1903 (pdf, html, doc)	Umamaheswaran, V. S. (1998-12-30), "8.1.6", Minutes of WG 2 meeting 35, London, U.K.; 1998-09-21--25
3.0	U+A000..A48C	1,165	L2/99-095.1	N1987-2	Irish comments on CD ISO/IEC 10646-1/FPDAM 14 (Yi), 1999-01-19
3.0	U+A000..A48C	1,165	L2/99-232	N2003	Umamaheswaran, V. S. (1999-08-03), "6.2.1 FPDAM14 - Yi syllables and Yi radicals", Minutes of WG 2 meeting 36, Fukuoka, Japan, 1999-03-09--15
3.0	U+A000..A48C	1,165	L2/04-293		West, Andrew (2004-07-19), Clarifications on the Usage of A015
3.0	U+A000..A48C	1,165	L2/04-325		West, Andrew (2004-08-03), Yi Syllable Foldings
3.0	U+A000..A48C	1,165	L2/06-157		McGowan, Rick (2006-05-12), "Proposed Additional Name Aliases (BETA FEEDBACK) [U+A015]", Comments on Public Review Issues (January 31, 2006 - May 12, 2006)
3.0	U+A000..A48C	1,165	L2/06-108		Moore, Lisa (2006-05-25), "B.11.10 [U+A015]", UTC #107 Minutes

== Notes ==
=== References ===
- Unicode chart Yi syllables (pdf) 5.0MB
