= 2008 in spaceflight =

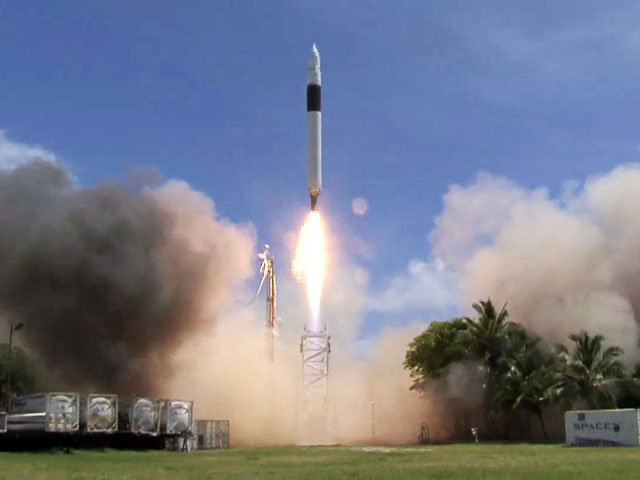
- First successful flight of a SpaceX Falcon 1

Orbital launches
- First: 15 January
- Last: 25 December
- Total: 69
- Successes: 66
- Failures: 2
- Partial failures: 1
- Catalogued: 67

National firsts
- Satellite: Venezuela; Vietnam
- Space traveller: South Korea

Rockets
- Maiden flights: Ariane 5ES; Long March 3C; PSLV-XL; Safir; Zenit-3SLB
- Retirements: H-IIA 2024

Crewed flights
- Orbital: 7
- Total travellers: 37

2008 in spaceflight

The year 2008 contained several significant events in spaceflight, including the first flyby of Mercury by a spacecraft since 1975, the discovery of water ice on Mars by the Phoenix spacecraft, which landed in May, the first Chinese spacewalk in September, the launch of the first Indian Lunar probe in October, and the first successful flight of a privately developed orbital launch vehicle by SpaceX's Falcon 1.

== Overview ==
The internationally accepted definition of a spaceflight is any flight which crosses the Kármán line, 100 kilometres above sea level. The first recorded spaceflight launch of the year occurred on 11 January, when a Black Brant was launched on a suborbital trajectory from White Sands, with the LIDOS ultraviolet astronomy payload. This was followed by the first orbital launch of the year on 15 January, by a Sea Launch Zenit-3SL, with the Thuraya 3 communications satellite. The launch marked the return to flight for Sea Launch following the explosion of a Zenit-3SL on the launch pad the previous January during an attempt to launch the NSS-8 satellite.

Five carrier rockets made their maiden flights in 2008; the Ariane 5ES, Long March 3C, Zenit-3SLB, PSLV-XL, and the operational version of the Falcon 1, with an uprated Merlin-1C engine. These were all derived from existing systems. The Blue Sparrow and Sejjil missiles also conducted their maiden flights, and the ATK Launch Vehicle made its only flight, but was destroyed by range safety after it went off course. In November, the baseline Proton-M was retired in favour of the Enhanced variant, first launched in 2007.

The first Vietnamese and Venezuelan satellites, Vinasat-1 and Venesat-1 respectively, were launched in 2008, while a failed Iranian launch was reported to have been that country's first indigenous orbital launch attempt. In September, SpaceX conducted the first successful orbital launch of a privately developed and funded liquid-fuelled carrier rocket, when the fourth Falcon 1 launched RatSat, following previous failures in 2006, 2007, and August.

== Space exploration ==
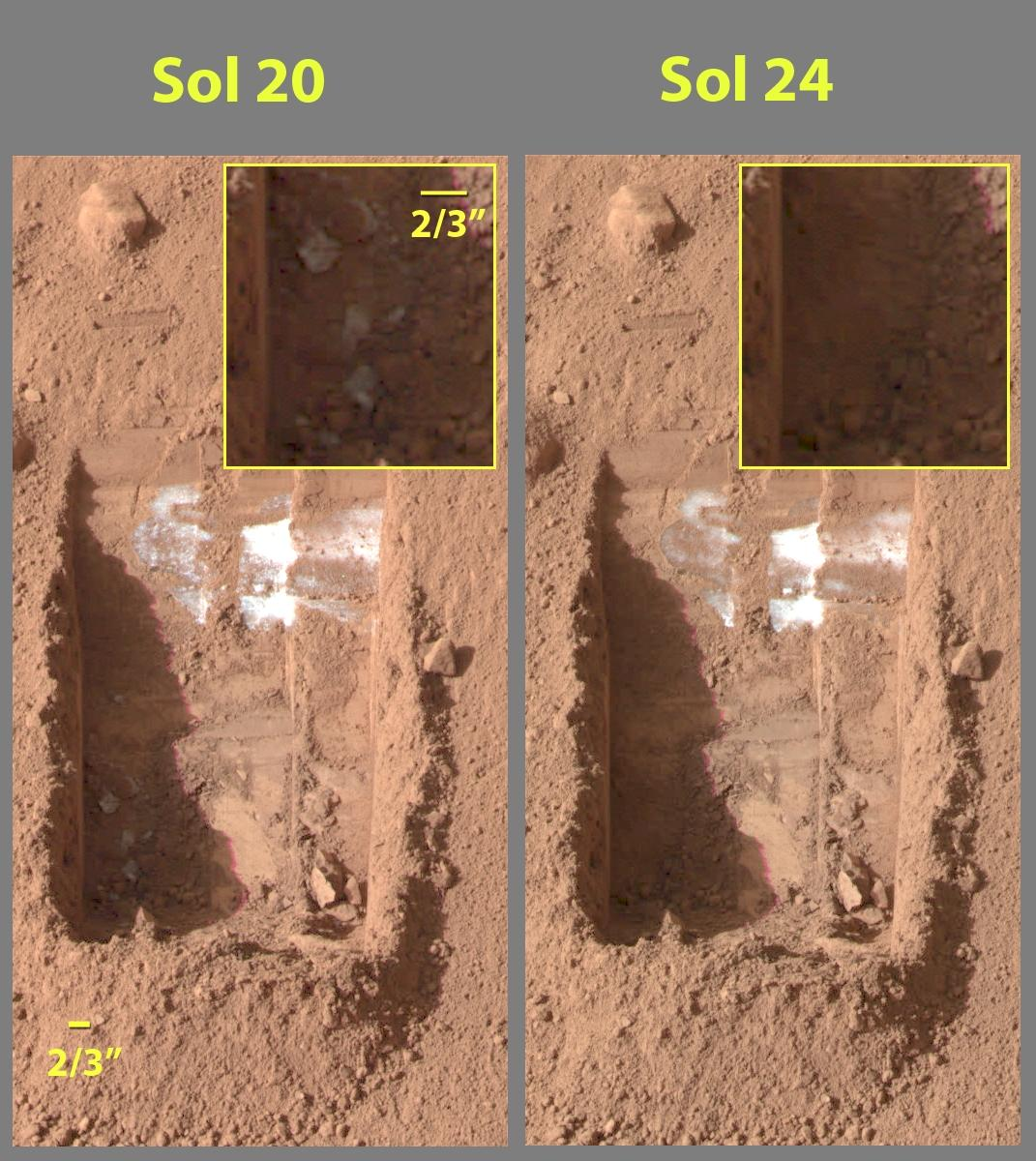
The discovery of water ice on Mars

India launched its first Lunar probe, Chandraayan-1, on 22 October, with the spacecraft entering selenocentric orbit on 8 November. On 16 November, the Moon Impact Probe was released, and crashed into the Lunar surface. Although no other spacecraft were launched beyond geocentric orbit in 2008, several significant events occurred in interplanetary flights which had been launched in previous years. MESSENGER conducted flybys of Mercury in January and October, the first spacecraft to do so since Mariner 10 in 1975. Cassini continued to make flybys of the moons of Saturn, including several close passes of Enceladus, one at a distance of 25 kilometres. In September Rosetta flew past the asteroid 2867 Šteins. On 25 May, the Phoenix spacecraft landed in the Green Valley on Mars, where it discovered water ice. Phoenix exceeded its design life of 90 days, finally failing on 10 November. The Ulysses spacecraft, launched in 1990, was also retired in 2008.

== Crewed spaceflight ==
Seven crewed flights were launched in 2008, one by China, two by Russia and four by the United States. In April, Yi So-yeon became the first South Korean to fly in space, aboard Soyuz TMA-12. On the same flight, Sergey Volkov became the first second-generation cosmonaut. Yi returned to Earth aboard Soyuz TMA-11, which nearly ended in disaster following a separation failure between the descent and service modules, resulting in a ballistic reentry. In September, China conducted its third crewed mission, Shenzhou 7, from which Zhai Zhigang and Liu Boming conducted the first Chinese spacewalk. Soyuz TMA-13, launched in October, was the hundredth flight of the Soyuz programme to carry a crew at some point in its mission.

Assembly of the International Space Station continued, with the delivery of the Columbus module by Space Shuttle Atlantis on mission STS-122 in February. March saw the launch of the Jules Verne Automated Transfer Vehicle, an uncrewed European spacecraft which was used to resupply the space station. Also in March, Space Shuttle Endeavour launched on STS-123 with the first component of the Japanese Experiment Module, the Experiment Logistics Module. STS-123 marked the final flight of the Spacelab programme, with a SpaceLab pallet used to carry the Canadian-built Dextre RMS extension. The second JEM component, the main pressurised module, was launched by STS-124, flown by Discovery in May. In November, Endeavour launched on the STS-126 logistics flight, with the Leonardo MPLM.

== Launch failures ==
On 14 March, a Proton-M with a Briz-M upper stage launched AMC-14. Several hours later, on 15 March, the Briz-M engine cut off prematurely during a burn, leaving the satellite in a medium Earth orbit. Following a small legal dispute, the satellite was sold, and raised to a geosynchronous orbit by its manoeuvring thrusters, at the expense of a large amount of its fuel and hence operational life.

On 3 August, SpaceX launched the third Falcon 1. Due to residual thrust caused by the upgraded Merlin-1C engine which was being flown for the first time, the first stage recontacted the second during staging, resulting in the rocket failing to reach orbit. The Trailblazer, PreSat and NanoSail-D satellites were lost in the failure, as was a space burial capsule, containing the remains of several hundred people, including astronaut Gordon Cooper, actor James Doohan, writer and director John Meredyth Lucas and Apollo mission planner Mareta West.

On 16 August, Iran launched a Safir, which though officially successful, was reported to have failed due to a second stage malfunction. The purpose of this launch is in doubt, as before the launch it was claimed that it would place the Omid into orbit, whilst following the launch, it was reported that a boilerplate payload had been launched. Other reports indicated that the launch was only a suborbital test of the rocket. If this was an orbital launch attempt, it was the first Iranian attempt to launch a satellite.

On 22 August, the inaugural launch of the Alliant Techsystems ALV X-1 was terminated 27 seconds after launch from Wallops Flight Facility when it veered off course. Both hypersonic physics experiments on board were destroyed.

== Summary of launches ==
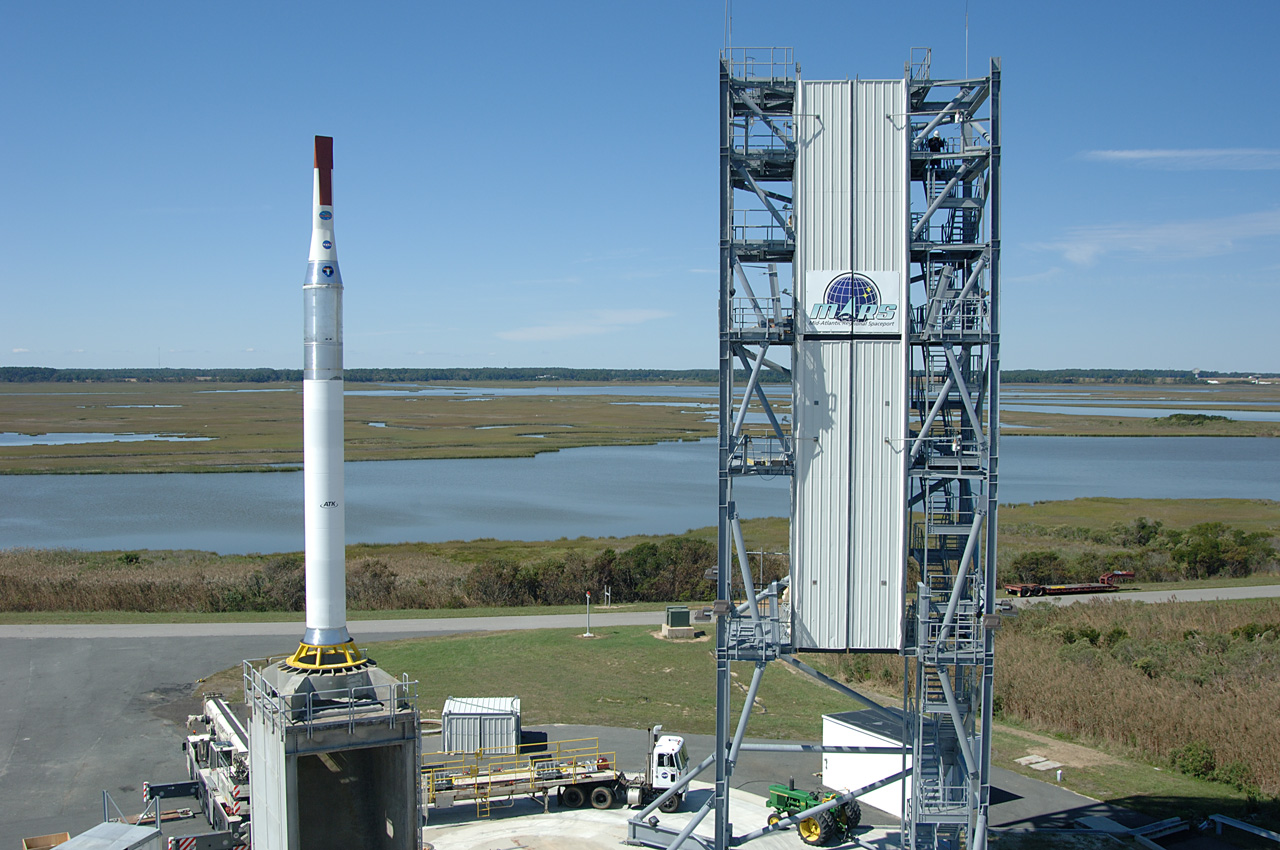
The ATK Launch Vehicle, launched on a suborbital flight in August

In total, sixty nine orbital launches were made in 2008, with sixty seven reaching orbit, and two outright failures if the Iranian launch in August is counted. This is an increase of one orbital launch attempt on 2007, with two more launches reaching orbit, which continues a trend of increasing launch rates seen since 2006. The final launch of the year was conducted on 25 December, by a Proton-M with three GLONASS navigation satellites for the Russian government.

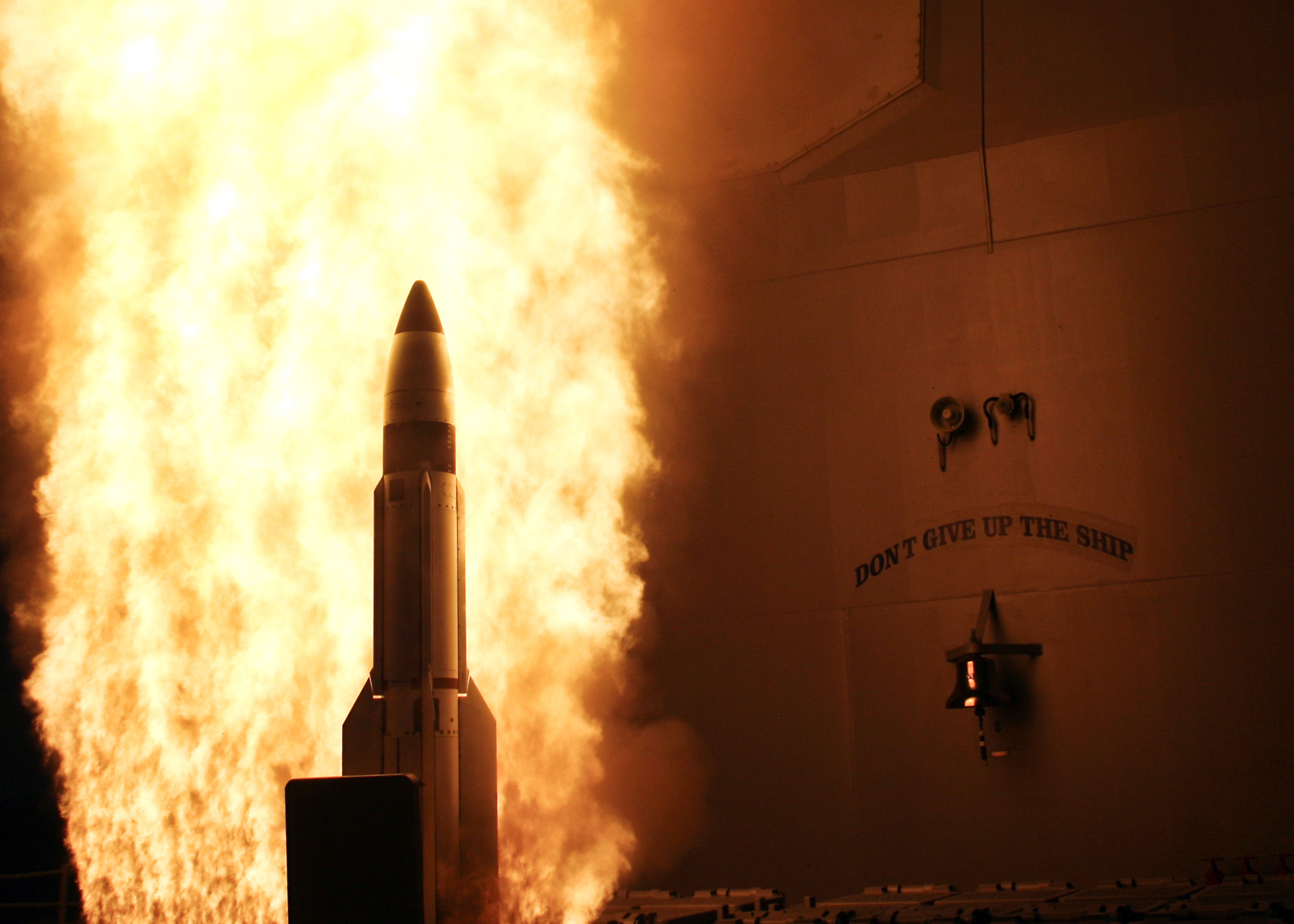
Launch of an SM-3 missile to destroy USA-193

Suborbital spaceflight in 2008 saw a number of sounding rocket and missile launches. On 21 February, a RIM-161 Standard Missile 3 was used as an anti-satellite weapon to destroy the USA-193 satellite. USA-193 was a US spy satellite which had failed immediately after launch in 2006.

=== By country ===
China conducted twelve orbital launches of a planned fifteen. Europe had intended to conduct seven launches of Ariane 5 rockets, and the maiden flight of the Vega rocket, however payload delays pushed one of the Arianes into 2009, and the Vega was delayed due to development issues. India had originally scheduled five to seven launches, however only three of these were conducted, mostly due to delays with the launch of Chandraayan-1. Japan scheduled three launches for 2008, of which one was launched; an H-IIA with WINDS in February. Russia and the former Soviet Union conducted twenty six launches, not including the international Sea and Land launch programmes, which conducted six. Fourteen launches were conducted by the United States, which had originally announced plans to launch many more, however technical issues with several rockets, particularly the Atlas V, Delta II and Falcon 1, caused a number of delays. The Atlas problems, combined with a series of delays to the launch of NRO L-26 on a Delta IV, resulted in just two of ten planned EELV launches being conducted. Two of six planned Space Shuttle launches were also delayed to 2009, one due to problems with External Tank delivery, and another due to a major systems failure on the Hubble Space Telescope, which it was to have serviced. Israel was not reported to have scheduled, or conducted an orbital launch attempt.

== Orbital launches ==
- ← Jan
- Feb
- Mar
- Apr
- May
- Jun
- Jul
- Aug
- Sep
- Oct
- Nov
- Dec →

Date and time (UTC)	Rocket	Flight number	Launch site		LSP	
Date and time (UTC)	Payload (⚀ = CubeSat)	Operator	Orbit	Function	Decay (UTC)	Outcome
Date and time (UTC)	Remarks					
=== January ===
15 January; 11:49	(Ukraine) Zenit-3SL		(Norway) Ocean Odyssey		(United Nations) Sea Launch	
15 January; 11:49	(United States) Thuraya 3	Thuraya	Geosynchronous	Communications	In orbit	Operational
21 January; 03:45	(India) PSLV-CA		(India) Satish Dhawan FLP		(India) ISRO	
21 January; 03:45	(Israel) TecSAR (Polaris)	IAI	Low Earth	Reconnaissance	In orbit	Operational
28 January; 00:18	(Russia) Proton-M / Briz-M		(Kazakhstan) Baikonur Site 200/39		(Russia) Roskosmos	
28 January; 00:18	(Russia) Ekspress AM-33	RSCC	Geosynchronous	Communications	In orbit	Operational
← Jan; Feb; Mar; Apr; May; Jun; Jul; Aug; Sep; Oct; Nov; Dec →; === February ===
5 February; 13:02:54	(Russia) Soyuz-U		(Kazakhstan) Baikonur Site 1/5		(Russia) Roscosmos	
5 February; 13:02:54	(Russia) Progress M-63	Roscosmos	Low Earth (ISS)	ISS logistics	7 April; 11:50	Successful
5 February; 13:02:54	ISS flight 28P					
7 February; 19:45:30	(United States) Space Shuttle Atlantis		(United States) Kennedy LC-39A		(United States) United Space Alliance	
7 February; 19:45:30	(United States) STS-122	NASA	Low Earth (ISS)	ISS assembly	20 February; 14:07:10	Successful
7 February; 19:45:30	(United Nations) Columbus	ESA	Low Earth (ISS)	ISS assembly	In orbit	Operational
7 February; 19:45:30	Crewed flight with seven astronauts					
11 February; 11:34	(Russia) Proton-M / Briz-M		(Kazakhstan) Baikonur Site 200/39		(Russia) (United States) International Launch Services	
11 February; 11:34	(Norway) Thor-5	Telenor	Geosynchronous	Communications	In orbit	Operational
23 February; 08:55	(Japan) H-IIA 2024		(Japan) Tanegashima LA-Y		(Japan) Mitsubishi	
23 February; 08:55	(Japan) WINDS (Kizuna)	JAXA / NICT	Geosynchronous	Communications; Technology	In orbit	Successful
← Jan; Feb; Mar; Apr; May; Jun; Jul; Aug; Sep; Oct; Nov; Dec →; === March ===
9 March; 04:03:07	Unknown		(France) Kourou ELA-3		(France) Arianespace	
9 March; 04:03:07	Jules Verne ATV	ESA	Low Earth (ISS)	ISS logistics	29 September; 13:31	Successful
9 March; 04:03:07	Maiden flight of Ariane 5ES and ATV					
11 March; 06:28:14	(United States) Space Shuttle Endeavour		(United States) Kennedy LC-39A		(United States) United Space Alliance	
11 March; 06:28:14	(United States) STS-123	NASA	Low Earth (ISS)	ISS assembly	27 March; 00:39:08	Successful
11 March; 06:28:14	(United States) Spacelab MD002	NASA	Low Earth (STS/ISS)	ISS logistics	27 March; 00:39:08	Successful
11 March; 06:28:14	(United Nations) JEM ELM-PF	JAXA	Low Earth (ISS)	ISS assembly	In orbit	Operational
11 March; 06:28:14	(United Nations) Dextre (SPDM)	MDA Corporation	Low Earth (ISS)	ISS assembly	In orbit	Operational
11 March; 06:28:14	Crewed flight with seven astronauts Final flight of Spacelab programme, pallet used to transport Dextre					
13 March; 10:02	(United States) Atlas V 411		(United States) Vandenberg SLC-3E		(United States) United Launch Alliance	
13 March; 10:02	(United States) USA-200 (Improved Trumpet)	NRO	Molniya	ELINT	In orbit	Operational
13 March; 10:02	NRO Launch 28, first Atlas V launch from Vandenberg					
14 March; 23:18:55	(Russia) Proton-M / Briz-M		(Kazakhstan) Baikonur Site 200/39		(Russia) (United States) International Launch Services	
14 March; 23:18:55	(United States) AMC-14	SES Americom	Geosynchronous	Communications	In orbit	Operational; Partial launch failure
14 March; 23:18:55	Upper stage malfunction during second burn left spacecraft in wrong orbit Initial recovery attempted but abandoned due to legal issues. Later sold and recovery efforts restarted.					
15 March; 06:10	(United States) Delta II 7925-9.5		(United States) Cape Canaveral SLC-17A		(United States) United Launch Alliance	
15 March; 06:10	(United States) USA-201 (GPS IIR-19/M6)	US Air Force	Medium Earth	Navigation	In orbit	Operational
15 March; 06:10	80th consecutive successful Delta II launch.					
19 March; 22:47:59	(Ukraine) Zenit-3SL		(Norway) Ocean Odyssey		(United Nations) Sea Launch	
19 March; 22:47:59	(United States) DirecTV-11	DirecTV	Geosynchronous	Communications	In orbit	Operational
27 March; 17:15	(Russia) Kosmos-3M		(Russia) Plesetsk Site 132/1		(Russia) (Germany) COSMOS International	
27 March; 17:15	(Germany) SAR-Lupe 4	Bundeswehr	Low Earth (SSO)	Reconnaissance	In orbit	Operational
← Jan; Feb; Mar; Apr; May; Jun; Jul; Aug; Sep; Oct; Nov; Dec →; === April ===
8 April; 11:16:39	(Russia) Soyuz-FG		(Kazakhstan) Baikonur Site 1/5		(Russia) Roscosmos	
8 April; 11:16:39	(Russia) Soyuz TMA-12	Roscosmos	Low Earth (ISS)	ISS Expedition 17	24 October; 03:37	Successful
8 April; 11:16:39	Crewed flight with three cosmonauts, including first South Korean in space and first second-generation cosmonaut Docked on 10 April at 12:57 GMT					
14 April; 20:12:00	(United States) Atlas V 421		(United States) Cape Canaveral SLC-41		(United States) United Launch Alliance	
14 April; 20:12:00	(United States) ICO G1	ICO	Geosynchronous	Communications	In orbit	Operational
14 April; 20:12:00	Heaviest single commercial satellite to be placed in GSO. Heaviest satellite to be launched by an Atlas rocket.					
16 April; 17:01	(United States) Pegasus-XL		(Marshall Islands) (United States) Stargazer, Kwajalein Atoll		(United States) Orbital Sciences	
16 April; 17:01	(United States) C/NOFS	STP/NASA	Low Earth	Electrodynamics	28 November 2015	Successful
18 April; 22:17	Unknown		(France) Kourou ELA-3		(France) Arianespace	
18 April; 22:17	(Vietnam) Vinasat-1	VNPT	Geosynchronous	Communications	In orbit	Operational
18 April; 22:17	(Brazil) Star One C2	Star One	Geosynchronous	Communications	In orbit	Operational
18 April; 22:17	First Vietnamese satellite					
25 April; 15:35	(China) Long March 3C		(China) Xichang LA-2		(China) CNSA	
25 April; 15:35	(China) Tianlian I-01	CNSA	Geosynchronous	Communications	In orbit	Operational
25 April; 15:35	Maiden flight of Long March 3C					
26 April; 22:16:02	(Russia) Soyuz-FG / Fregat		(Kazakhstan) Baikonur Site 31/6		(France) (Russia) Starsem	
26 April; 22:16:02	GIOVE-B	ESA	Medium Earth	Navigation; Technology demonstration	In orbit	Operational
28 April; 03:53:51	(India) PSLV-C		(India) Satish Dhawan SLP		(India) ISRO	
28 April; 03:53:51	(India) Cartosat-2A	ISRO	Low Earth	Earth observation	In orbit	Operational
28 April; 03:53:51	(India) TWSAT (IMS-1)	ISRO	Low Earth	Earth observation	In orbit	Operational
28 April; 03:53:51	(Germany) RUBIN-8	OHB System	Low Earth	Technology demonstration	In orbit	Operational
28 April; 03:53:51	⚀ (Denmark) AAUSAT-II	Aalborg	Low Earth	Radiation	In orbit	Operational
28 April; 03:53:51	⚀ (Canada) CanX-2	UTIAS	Low Earth	Technology demonstration	In orbit	Operational
28 April; 03:53:51	⚀ (Canada) CanX-6	UTIAS/COM DEV	Low Earth	Technology demonstration	In orbit	Operational
28 April; 03:53:51	⚀ (Germany) COMPASS-1	Aachen	Low Earth	Earth observation Technology demonstration	In orbit	Operational
28 April; 03:53:51	⚀ (Japan) CUTE-1.7 + APD II	Tokodai	Low Earth	Technology demonstration	In orbit	Operational
28 April; 03:53:51	⚀ (Netherlands) Delfi-C3	Delft	Low Earth	Technology demonstration	13 November 2023	Successful
28 April; 03:53:51	⚀ (Japan) SEEDS-2	Nihon	Low Earth	Technology demonstration	In orbit	Operational
28 April; 03:53:51	All payloads except CartoSat, TWSAT and RUBIN were CubeSats, launched under designation NSL-4, except CanX-6 which was NSL-5. RUBIN-8 intentionally remained attached to upper stage					
28 April; 05:00	(Ukraine) Zenit-3SLB		(Kazakhstan) Baikonur Site 45/1		(United Nations) Land Launch	
28 April; 05:00	(Israel) AMOS-3 (AMOS-60)	SCL	Geosynchronous	Communications	In orbit	Operational
28 April; 05:00	First Land Launch flight and maiden flight of Zenit-3SLB. Reached incorrect orbit due to carrier rocket underperformance. Corrected by satellite through use of spare fuel, without affecting operational life.					
← Jan; Feb; Mar; Apr; May; Jun; Jul; Aug; Sep; Oct; Nov; Dec →; === May ===
14 May; 20:22:54	(Russia) Soyuz-U		(Kazakhstan) Baikonur Site 1/5		(Russia) Roscosmos	
14 May; 20:22:54	(Russia) Progress M-64	Roscosmos	Low Earth (ISS)	ISS logistics	8 September	Successful
14 May; 20:22:54	ISS flight 29P					
21 May; 09:43	(Ukraine) Zenit-3SL		(Norway) Ocean Odyssey		(United Nations) Sea Launch	
21 May; 09:43	(United Nations) Galaxy 18	Intelsat	Geosynchronous	Communications	In orbit	Operational
23 May; 15:20:09	(Russia) Rokot / Briz-KM		(Russia) Plesetsk Site 133/3		(Russia) RVSN RF	
23 May; 15:20:09	(Russia) Kosmos 2437 (Rodnik)	VKS	Low Earth	Communications	In orbit	Operational
23 May; 15:20:09	(Russia) Kosmos 2438 (Rodnik)	VKS	Low Earth	Communications	In orbit	Operational
23 May; 15:20:09	(Russia) Kosmos 2439 (Rodnik)	VKS	Low Earth	Communications	In orbit	Operational
23 May; 15:20:09	(Russia) Yubeleiny	NPO PM	Low Earth	Technology demonstration	In orbit	Operational
27 May; 03:02	(China) Long March 4C		(China) Taiyuan LC-1		(China) CASC	
27 May; 03:02	(China) Fengyun 3A	CMA	Sun-synchronous	Weather	In orbit	Operational
31 May; 21:02:12	(United States) Space Shuttle Discovery		(United States) Kennedy LC-39A		(United States) United Space Alliance	
31 May; 21:02:12	(United States) STS-124	NASA	Low Earth (ISS)	ISS assembly	14 June; 15:15	Successful
31 May; 21:02:12	(United Nations) JEM-PM	JAXA	Low Earth (ISS)	ISS assembly	In orbit	Operational
31 May; 21:02:12	Crewed flight with seven astronauts					
← Jan; Feb; Mar; Apr; May; Jun; Jul; Aug; Sep; Oct; Nov; Dec →; === June ===
9 June; 12:15	(China) Long March 3B		(China) Xichang LC-2		(China) CASC	
9 June; 12:15	(China) Chinasat 9	CNPT	Geosynchronous	Communications	In orbit	Operational
11 June; 16:05	(United States) Delta II 7920H-10C		(United States) Cape Canaveral SLC-17B		(United States) United Launch Alliance	
11 June; 16:05	(United States) FGST (GLAST)	NASA	Low Earth	Gamma-ray astronomy	In orbit	Operational
12 June; 22:05:02	Unknown		(France) Kourou ELA-3		(France) Arianespace	
12 June; 22:05:02	(United Kingdom) Skynet 5C	MoD	Geosynchronous	Communications	In orbit	Operational
12 June; 22:05:02	(Turkey) Turksat 3A	Türksat	Geosynchronous	Communications	In orbit	Operational
19 June; 06:36	(Russia) Kosmos-3M		(Russia) Kapustin Yar Site 107		(Russia) (Germany) COSMOS International	
19 June; 06:36	(United States) Orbcomm CDS-3	Orbcomm	Low Earth	Communications	In orbit	Spacecraft failure
19 June; 06:36	(United States) Orbcomm QL-1	Orbcomm	Low Earth	Communications	In orbit	Operational
19 June; 06:36	(United States) Orbcomm QL-2	Orbcomm	Low Earth	Communications	In orbit	Spacecraft failure
19 June; 06:36	(United States) Orbcomm QL-3	Orbcomm	Low Earth	Communications	In orbit	Operational
19 June; 06:36	(United States) Orbcomm QL-4	Orbcomm	Low Earth	Communications	In orbit	Spacecraft failure
19 June; 06:36	(United States) Orbcomm QL-5	Orbcomm	Low Earth	Communications	In orbit	Spacecraft failure
19 June; 06:36	Spacecraft affected by communications problems, four had failed by December 2009.					
20 June; 07:46:25	(United States) Delta II 7320		(United States) Vandenberg SLC-2W		(United States) United Launch Alliance	
20 June; 07:46:25	(United States) Jason-2 (OSTM)	NASA	Low Earth	Oceanography	In orbit	Operational
26 June; 23:59	(Russia) Proton-K / DM-2 (?? DM-3)		(Kazakhstan) Baikonur Site 81/24		(Russia) RVSN RF	
26 June; 23:59	(Russia) Kosmos 2440 (Prognoz)	VKS	Geosynchronous	Missile defence	In orbit	Operational
← Jan; Feb; Mar; Apr; May; Jun; Jul; Aug; Sep; Oct; Nov; Dec →; === July ===
7 July; 21:47	Unknown		(France) Kourou ELA-3		(France) Arianespace	
7 July; 21:47	(Saudi Arabia) Badr-6	Arabsat	Geosynchronous	Communications	In orbit	Operational
7 July; 21:47	(Bermuda) ProtoStar-1	ProtoStar	Geosynchronous	Communications	In orbit	Operational
16 July; 05:20:59	(Ukraine) Zenit-3SL		(Norway) Ocean Odyssey		(United Nations) Sea Launch	
16 July; 05:20:59	(United States) Echostar 11	Echostar	Geosynchronous	Communications	In orbit	Operational
22 July; 02:40:09	(Russia) Kosmos-3M		(Russia) Plesetsk Site 132/1		(Russia) (Germany) COSMOS International	
22 July; 02:40:09	(Germany) SAR-Lupe 5	Bundeswehr	Low Earth (SSO)	Reconnaissance	In orbit	Operational
26 July; 18:31	(Russia) Soyuz-2.1b		(Russia) Plesetsk Site 43/4		(Russia) RVSN RF	
26 July; 18:31	(Russia) Kosmos 2441 (Persona)	VKS	Low Earth (SSO)	Reconnaissance	In orbit	Spacecraft failure
26 July; 18:31	Spacecraft lost due to electrical malfunction					
← Jan; Feb; Mar; Apr; May; Jun; Jul; Aug; Sep; Oct; Nov; Dec →; === August ===
3 August; 03:34	(United States) Falcon 1		(Marshall Islands) Omelek		(United States) SpaceX	
3 August; 03:34	(United States) Trailblazer	ORS / MDA	Intended: Low Earth	Technology demonstration	~T+140 seconds	Launch failure
3 August; 03:34	⚀ (United States) PreSat	Santa Clara / NASA	Intended: Low Earth	Biological	~T+140 seconds	Launch failure
3 August; 03:34	⚀ (United States) NanoSail-D	Santa Clara / NASA	Intended: Low Earth	Solar sail	~T+140 seconds	Launch failure
3 August; 03:34	(United States) Explorers	Celestis	Intended: Low Earth	Space burial	~T+140 seconds	Launch failure
3 August; 03:34	First and second stage recontact due to residual thrust. PreSAT and NanoSail-D CubeSats, Celestis burial payload included remains of astronaut Gordon Cooper, actor James Doohan, writer and director John Meredyth Lucas, and Apollo mission planner Mareta West					
14 August; 20:44	Unknown		(France) Kourou ELA-3		(France) Arianespace	
14 August; 20:44	(Japan) Superbird 7	SCC	Geosynchronous	Communications	In orbit	Operational
14 August; 20:44	(United States) AMC-21	SES Americom	Geosynchronous	Communications	In orbit	Operational
16 August; 19:32	(Iran) Safir	LBS.2001	(Iran) Semnan		(Iran) ISA	
16 August; 19:32	(Iran) DemoSat	ISA	Intended: Low Earth	Test flight	16 August	Launch failure
16 August; 19:32	Reported to have been first Iranian orbital launch attempt. Officially successful, however no objects were left in orbit. Unofficial reports of a second stage malfunction. Also reported to have been a suborbital test, or an attempt to launch the Omid satellite, instead of an orbital test launch.					
18 August; 22:43	(Russia) Proton-M / Briz-M Enhanced		(Kazakhstan) Baikonur Site 200/39		(Russia) (United States) International Launch Services	
18 August; 22:43	(United Kingdom) Inmarsat-4 F3	Inmarsat	Geosynchronous	Communications	In orbit	Operational
29 August; 07:15:58	(Ukraine) Dnepr		(Kazakhstan) Baikonur Site 109/95		(Russia) ISC Kosmotras	
29 August; 07:15:58	(Germany) Tachys (RapidEye-1)	RapidEye / Planet Labs	Low Earth (SSO)	Earth observation	In orbit	Successful
29 August; 07:15:58	(Germany) Mati (RapidEye-2)	RapidEye / Planet Labs	Low Earth (SSO)	Earth observation	In orbit	Successful
29 August; 07:15:58	(Germany) Choma (RapidEye-3)	RapidEye / Planet Labs	Low Earth (SSO)	Earth observation	In orbit	Successful
29 August; 07:15:58	(Germany) Choros (RapidEye-4)	RapidEye / Planet Labs	Low Earth (SSO)	Earth observation	In orbit	Successful
29 August; 07:15:58	(Germany) Trochia (RapidEye-5)	RapidEye / Planet Labs	Low Earth (SSO)	Earth observation	In orbit	Successful
← Jan; Feb; Mar; Apr; May; Jun; Jul; Aug; Sep; Oct; Nov; Dec →; === September ===
6 September; 03:25	(China) Long March 2C		(China) Taiyuan LC-1		(China) CASC	
6 September; 03:25	(China) Huan Jing 1A	CNSA	Low Earth (SSO)	Earth observation	In orbit	Operational
6 September; 03:25	(China) Huan Jing 1B	CNSA	Low Earth (SSO)	Earth observation	In orbit	Operational
6 September; 18:50:57	(United States) Delta II 7420		(United States) Vandenberg SLC-2W		(United States) United Launch Alliance	
6 September; 18:50:57	(United States) GeoEye 1 (Orbview 5)	GeoEye	Low Earth (SSO)	Earth observation	In orbit	Operational
10 September; 19:50:02	(Russia) Soyuz-U		(Kazakhstan) Baikonur Site 1/5		(Russia) Roscosmos	
10 September; 19:50:02	(Russia) Progress M-65	Roscosmos	Low Earth (ISS)	ISS logistics	7 December; 08:48:47	Successful
10 September; 19:50:02	ISS flight 30P					
19 September; 21:48	(Russia) Proton-M / Briz-M		(Kazakhstan) Baikonur Site 200/39		(Russia) (United States) International Launch Services	
19 September; 21:48	(Canada) Nimiq-4	Telesat Canada	Geosynchronous	Communications	In orbit	Operational
24 September; 09:27:59	(Ukraine) Zenit-3SL		(Norway) Ocean Odyssey		(United Nations) Sea Launch	
24 September; 09:27:59	(United Nations) Galaxy 19	Intelsat	Geosynchronous	Communications	In orbit	Operational
25 September; 08:49:37	(Russia) Proton-M / DM-2		(Kazakhstan) Baikonur Site 81/24		(Russia) RVSN RF	
25 September; 08:49:37	(Russia) Kosmos 2442 (GLONASS)	VKS	Medium Earth	Navigation	In orbit	Operational
25 September; 08:49:37	(Russia) Kosmos 2443 (GLONASS)	VKS	Medium Earth	Navigation	In orbit	Operational
25 September; 08:49:37	(Russia) Kosmos 2444 (GLONASS)	VKS	Medium Earth	Navigation	In orbit	Operational
25 September; 13:10	(China) Long March 2F		(China) Jiuquan LA-4/SLS-1		(China) CASC	
25 September; 13:10	(China) Shenzhou 7	CMSA	Low Earth	Crewed flight	28 September; 09:37:40	Successful
25 September; 13:10	(China) Ban Xing	CMSA	Low Earth	Technology demonstration	30 October 2009	Successful
25 September; 13:10	(China) Shenzhou 7-GC	CMSA	Low Earth	Technology demonstration	4 January 2010	Successful
25 September; 13:10	Crewed flight with three yǔhángyuán, crew conducted first Chinese EVA; Ban Xing deployed from Shenzhou on 27 September at 11:27 GMT, GC separated on 28 September at 08:48 to begin independent mission					
28 September; 23:15	(United States) Falcon 1		(Marshall Islands) Omelek		(United States) SpaceX	
28 September; 23:15	(United States) RatSat	SpaceX	Low Earth	Boilerplate	In orbit	Successful
28 September; 23:15	Launched boilerplate payload. First privately funded and developed liquid fuelled rocket to reach orbit.					
← Jan; Feb; Mar; Apr; May; Jun; Jul; Aug; Sep; Oct; Nov; Dec →; === October ===
1 October; 06:37:16	(Ukraine) Dnepr		(Russia) Dombarovskiy		(Russia) ISC Kosmotras	
1 October; 06:37:16	(Thailand) THEOS	GISTDA	Low Earth	Earth observation	In orbit	Operational
12 October; 07:01	(Russia) Soyuz-FG		(Kazakhstan) Baikonur Site 1/5		(Russia) Roscosmos	
12 October; 07:01	(Russia) Soyuz TMA-13	Roscosmos	Low Earth (ISS)	ISS Expedition 18	8 April 2009; 07:16	Successful
12 October; 07:01	Crewed flight with three cosmonauts, including a space tourist. 100th flight of the Soyuz programme to be crewed at some point in its mission					
19 October; 17:47:23	(United States) Pegasus-XL/Star-27		(Marshall Islands) (United States) Stargazer, Kwajalein Atoll		(United States) Orbital Sciences	
19 October; 17:47:23	(United States) IBEX	NASA	High Earth	Solar	In orbit	Operational
22 October; 00:52:11	(India) PSLV-XL		(India) Satish Dhawan SLP		(India) ISRO	
22 October; 00:52:11	(India) Chandrayaan-1	ISRO	Selenocentric	Lunar orbiter	In orbit	Partial spacecraft failure
22 October; 00:52:11	(India) MIP	ISRO	Selenocentric	Lunar impactor	14 November	Successful
22 October; 00:52:11	First Indian lunar spacecraft, failed on 28 August 2009 after less than half of planned mission duration, maiden flight of PSLV-XL					
25 October; 01:15	(China) Long March 4B		(China) Taiyuan LC-2		(China) CASC	
25 October; 01:15	(China) Shijian 6-03A	CNSA	Low Earth	Technology demonstration	In orbit	Operational
25 October; 01:15	(China) Shijian 6-03B	CNSA	Low Earth	Technology demonstration	In orbit	Operational
25 October; 01:15	First launch from Taiyuan LC-2					
25 October; 02:28	(United States) Delta II 7420-10		(United States) Vandenberg SLC-2W		(United States) United Launch Alliance	
25 October; 02:28	(Italy) COSMO-3	ASI	Low Earth (SSO)	Earth observation	In orbit	Operational
29 October; 16:53:53	(China) Long March 3B/E		(China) Xichang LC-2		(China) CASC	
29 October; 16:53:53	(Venezuela) VeneSat-1 (Simón Bolívar)	VMoST	Geosynchronous	Communications	In orbit	Successful; Partial spacecraft failure
29 October; 16:53:53	First Venezuelan satellite. Lost in March 2020 due to the failure of both solar array drives.					
← Jan; Feb; Mar; Apr; May; Jun; Jul; Aug; Sep; Oct; Nov; Dec →; === November ===
5 November; 00:15	(China) Long March 2D		(China) Jiuquan Satellite Launch Center SLS-2		(China) CASC	
5 November; 00:15	(China) Chuang Xin 1B	CNSA	Low Earth	Weather	In orbit	Operational
5 November; 00:15	(China) Shiyan 3	CNSA	Low Earth	Technology demonstration	In orbit	Operational
5 November; 20:44	(Russia) Proton-M / Briz-M		(Kazakhstan) Baikonur Site 200/39		(Russia) (United States) International Launch Services	
5 November; 20:44	(Luxembourg) Astra 1M	SES Astra	Geosynchronous	Communications	In orbit	Operational
5 November; 20:44	Final flight of standard Proton-M					
14 November; 15:50	(Russia) Soyuz-U		(Russia) Plesetsk Site 16/2		(Russia) RVSN RF	
14 November; 15:50	(Russia) Kosmos 2445 (Kobalt-M)	VKS	Low Earth	Optical imaging	23 February 2009; 16:15	Successful
15 November; 00:55:39	(United States) Space Shuttle Endeavour		(United States) Kennedy LC-39A		(United States) United Space Alliance	
15 November; 00:55:39	(United States) STS-126	NASA	Low Earth (ISS)	ISS assembly	30 November; 21:25:06	Successful
15 November; 00:55:39	(Italy) (United States) Leonardo MPLM	ASI / NASA	Low Earth (ISS)	ISS logistics	30 November; 21:25:06	Successful
15 November; 00:55:39	(United States) PSSC	U.S. Air Force	Low Earth	Technology demonstration	17 February 2010; 17:31	Successful
15 November; 00:55:39	Crewed flight with seven astronauts, PSSC deployed from Shuttle at 20:33 GMT on 29 November and operated for 110 days.					
26 November; 12:38:27	(Russia) Soyuz-U		(Kazakhstan) Baikonur Site 1/5		(Russia) Roscosmos	
26 November; 12:38:27	(Russia) Progress M-01M	Roscosmos	Low Earth (ISS)	ISS logistics	8 February 2009; 08:20	Successful
26 November; 12:38:27	First flight of modernised Progress spacecraft, Kurs anomaly necessitated manual docking. ISS flight 31P					
← Jan; Feb; Mar; Apr; May; Jun; Jul; Aug; Sep; Oct; Nov; Dec →; === December ===
1 December; 04:42	(China) Long March 2D		(China) Jiuquan Satellite Launch Center SLS-2		(China) CASC	
1 December; 04:42	(China) Yaogan-4	CNSA	Low Earth (SSO)	Earth observation	In orbit	Operational
2 December; 05:00	(Russia) Molniya-M/2BL		(Russia) Plesetsk Site 16/2		(Russia) RVSN RF	
2 December; 05:00	(Russia) Kosmos 2446 (Oko)	VKS	Molniya	Missile defence	In orbit	Operational
10 December; 13:43:00	(Russia) Proton-M / Briz-M Enhanced		(Kazakhstan) Baikonur Site 200/39		(Russia) (United States) International Launch Services	
10 December; 13:43:00	(Canada) Ciel-2	Ciel	Geosynchronous	Communications	In orbit	Operational
15 December; 03:22	(China) Long March 4B		(China) Taiyuan LC-2		(China) CASC	
15 December; 03:22	(China) Yaogan-5	CNSA	Low Earth (SSO)	Earth observation	2 September 2014	Successful
20 December; 22:35	Unknown		(France) Kourou ELA-3		(France) Arianespace	
20 December; 22:35	(France) Hot Bird 9	Eutelsat	Geosynchronous	Communications	In orbit	Operational
20 December; 22:35	(France) Eutelsat W2M	Eutelsat	Geosynchronous	Communications	In orbit	Spacecraft failure
23 December; 00:54	(China) Long March 3A		(China) Xichang LC-2		(China) CASC	
23 December; 00:54	(China) Fengyun 2E	CMA	Geosynchronous	Meteorology	In orbit	Operational
25 December; 10:43	(Russia) Proton-M / DM-2 Enhanced		(Kazakhstan) Baikonur Site 81/24		(Russia) RVSN RF	
25 December; 10:43	(Russia) Kosmos 2447 (GLONASS)	VKS	Medium Earth	Navigation	In orbit	Operational
25 December; 10:43	(Russia) Kosmos 2448 (GLONASS)	VKS	Medium Earth	Navigation	In orbit	Operational
25 December; 10:43	(Russia) Kosmos 2449 (GLONASS)	VKS	Medium Earth	Navigation	In orbit	Operational
25 December; 10:43	First flight of Proton-M Enhanced with DM-2 upper stage, last orbital launch from Baikonur to be conducted by the Russian military					

- ← Jan
- Feb
- Mar
- Apr
- May
- Jun
- Jul
- Aug
- Sep
- Oct
- Nov
- Dec →

== Suborbital launches ==
- ← Jan
- Feb
- Mar
- Apr
- May
- Jun
- Jul
- Aug
- Sep
- Oct
- Nov
- Dec →

Date and time (UTC)	Rocket	Flight number	Launch site		LSP	
Date and time (UTC)	Payload (⚀ = CubeSat)	Operator	Orbit	Function	Decay (UTC)	Outcome
Date and time (UTC)	Remarks					
=== January-March ===
11 January; 05:32	(Canada) Black Brant IX		(United States) White Sands LC-36		(United States) NASA	
11 January; 05:32	(United States) LIDOS	JHU	Suborbital	UV Astronomy	05:42	Successful
11 January; 05:32	Apogee: 315 kilometres (196 mi)					
17 January	(Israel) Jericho III		(Israel) Palmachim		(Israel) Israeli Air Force	
17 January		Israeli Air Force	Suborbital	Missile test	17 January	Successful
18 January; 07:30	(Canada) Black Brant XII		(Norway) Andøya		(United States) NASA	
18 January; 07:30	(United States) SCIFER-2	Cornell/Dartmouth	Suborbital	Ionospheric research	18 January	Successful
18 January; 07:30	Apogee: 1,460 kilometres (910 mi)					
25 January	(Pakistan) Shaheen-I		(Pakistan) Sonmiani		Pakistan Army	
25 January		Pakistan Army	Suborbital	Missile test	25 January	Successful
31 January; 19:14	(Brazil) (United States) VS-30-Orion		(Norway) Andøya		(Germany) (Norway) DLR/Andøya	
31 January; 19:14	(United Kingdom) HotPay-2	University of Leeds	Suborbital	Ionospheric research	31 January	Successful
31 January; 19:14	Apogee: 380.6 kilometres (236.5 mi)					
4 February	(Iran) Safir		(Iran) Semnan		(Iran) ISA	
4 February	(Iran) Kavoshgar-1	ISA	Suborbital	Test flight	4 February	Successful
6 February; 09:14:40	(Japan) S-310		(Japan) Uchinoura		(Japan) JAXA	
6 February; 09:14:40		JAXA	Suborbital	Ionospheric research	6 February	Successful
7 February; 11:30	(Brazil) VSB-30		(Sweden) Esrange		(Germany) DLR / ESA	
7 February; 11:30	(Germany) TEXUS-44	DLR / ESA	Suborbital	Microgravity	7 February	Successful
7 February; 11:30	Apogee: 264 kilometres (164 mi)					
21 February; 03:26	(United States) RIM-161 Standard Missile 3		(United States) USS Lake Erie		(United States) U.S. Navy / MDA	
21 February; 03:26	(United States) ASAT	MDA	Suborbital	Satellite intercept	03:29	Successful
21 February; 03:26	Destroyed USA-193 satellite					
21 February; 06:15	(Brazil) VSB-30		(Sweden) Esrange		(Germany) DLR / ESA	
21 February; 06:15	(Germany) TEXUS-45	DLR / ESA	Suborbital	Microgravity	21 February	Successful
26 February; 07:28	(India) K-15 Sagarika		(India) INS Kalinga		(India) Indian Navy	
26 February; 07:28		Indian Navy	Suborbital	Missile test	26 February	Successful
23 March; 04:45	(India) Agni 1		(India) Integrated Test Range LC-4		(India) Indian Army	
23 March; 04:45		SFC / DRDO	Suborbital	Missile test	23 March	Successful
28 March	(Brazil) VSB-30		(Norway) Andøya		(Norway) Andøya	
28 March	(Norway) Mini-DUSTY 14	Andøya	Suborbital	Ionospheric research	28 March	Successful
=== April-June ===
2 April; 08:01	(United States) LGM-30G Minuteman III		(United States) Vandenberg LF-09		(United States) U.S. Air Force	
2 April; 08:01	(United States) GT-196GM	U.S. Air Force	Suborbital	Missile test	2 April	Successful
2 April; 08:01	Travelled 6,759 kilometres (4,200 mi) downrange					
14 April; 16:58	(Canada) Black Brant IX		(United States) White Sands LC-36		(United States) NASA	
14 April; 16:58	(United States) SEE	UCB LASP	Suborbital	UV Astronomy	17:08	Successful
15 April	(Israel) Blue Sparrow		F-15 Eagle, Israel		(Israel) Israeli Air Force	
15 April		Israeli Air Force	Suborbital	Test flight	15 April	Successful
15 April	Maiden flight of Blue Sparrow.					
19 April	(Pakistan) Shaheen-II		(Pakistan) Sonmiani		Pakistan Army	
19 April		Pakistan Army	Suborbital	Missile test	19 April	Successful
21 April	(Pakistan) Shaheen-II		(Pakistan) Sonmiani		Pakistan Army	
21 April		Pakistan Army	Suborbital	Missile test	21 April	Successful
1 May; 05:30	(Canada) Black Brant IX		(United States) White Sands LC-36		(United States) NASA	
1 May; 05:30		JHU	Suborbital	UV Astronomy	05:40	Successful
7 May; 04:26	(India) Agni-III		(India) Integrated Test Range LC-4		(India) Indian Army	
7 May; 04:26		SFC/DRDO	Suborbital	Missile test	04:41	Successful
8 May	(United States) UGM-133 Trident II		(United States) USS Nebraska		(United States) U.S. Navy	
8 May		U.S. Navy	Suborbital	Missile test	8 May	Successful
8 May	(United States) UGM-133 Trident II		(United States) USS Nebraska		(United States) U.S. Navy	
8 May		U.S. Navy	Suborbital	Missile test	8 May	Successful
15 May; 04:00	(Brazil) VSB-30		(Sweden) Esrange		(Sweden) (Germany) SSC/DLR	
15 May; 04:00	(Sweden) MASER-11	SSC/ESA	Suborbital	Microgravity	15 May	Successful
15 May; 04:00	Apogee: 252 kilometres (157 mi)					
22 May; 10:04	(United States) LGM-30G Minuteman III		(United States) Vandenberg LF-10		(United States) U.S. Air Force	
22 May; 10:04	(United States) GT-197GM	U.S. Air Force/NNSA	Suborbital	Missile test	22 May	Successful
22 May; 10:04	Long range test					
23 May; 05:00	(India) Prithvi		(India) Integrated Test Range		(India) Indian Army	
23 May; 05:00		Indian Army	Suborbital	Missile test	23 May	Successful
23 May; 05:00	User test					
29 May	(China) JL-2		(China) P629 submarine, Yellow Sea		(China) PLAN	
29 May		PLAN	Suborbital	Missile test	29 May	Successful
5 June; 18:13	(United States) TR-SRBM	FTM-14	(United States) USS Tripoli, Kauai		(United States) U.S. Navy / MDA	
5 June; 18:13		MDA	Suborbital	AEGIS target	5 June	Successful
5 June; 18:13	Destroyed after re-entry by endoatmospheric SM-2 missile launch					
13 June	(United States) MRT		(United States) Barking Sands		(United States) U.S. Navy / MDA	
13 June		MDA	Suborbital	AEGIS target	13 June	Successful
13 June	Used for simulated test, not intercepted					
13 June	(United States) MRT		(United States) Barking Sands		(United States) U.S. Navy / MDA	
13 June		MDA	Suborbital	AEGIS target	13 June	Successful
13 June	Used for simulated test, not intercepted					
26 June; 02:16	(United States) TRBM	FTT-09	(United States) C-17, Pacific Ocean		(United States) U.S. Air Force	
26 June; 02:16		MDA	Suborbital	THAAD Target	26 June	Successful
26 June; 02:16	Intercepted after re-entry by THAAD launched from KMR at 02:22 GMT.					
26 June; 19:57	(Canada) Black Brant XI		(United States) Wallops Island		(United States) NASA	
26 June; 19:57		MDA	Suborbital	Technology demonstration	26 June	Successful
30 June	(United States) Nike-Orion		(Norway) Andøya		(Norway) Andøya	
30 June	(Norway) (Germany) ECOMA 2008-1	Andøya / DLR	Suborbital	Aeronomy	30 June	Successful
=== July-September ===
7 July; 21:30	(United States) Nike-Orion		(Norway) Andøya		(Norway) Andøya	
7 July; 21:30	(Norway) (Germany) ECOMA 2008-2	Andøya / DLR	Suborbital	Aeronomy	7 July	Successful
7 July; 21:30	Apogee: 125 kilometres (78 mi)					
9 July	(Iran) Shahab-3		(Iran) Strait of Hormuz		(Iran) IRGC	
9 July		IRGC	Suborbital	Missile test	9 July	Successful
9 July	Part of Great Prophet III exercise.					
9 July	(Iran) Shahab-2		(Iran) Strait of Hormuz		(Iran) IRGC	
9 July		IRGC	Suborbital	Missile test	9 July	Successful
9 July	Part of Great Prophet III exercise, missile type not confirmed.					
9 July	(Iran) Shahab-1		(Iran) Strait of Hormuz		(Iran) IRGC	
9 July		IRGC	Suborbital	Missile test	9 July	Successful
9 July	Part of Great Prophet III exercise, missile type not confirmed.					
10 July	(Iran) Shahab-3		(Iran) Strait of Hormuz		(Iran) IRGC	
10 July		IRGC	Suborbital	Missile test	10 July	Successful
10 July	Part of Great Prophet III exercise, missile type not confirmed.					
12 July; 10:46	(United States) Nike-Orion		(Norway) Andøya		(Norway) Andøya	
12 July; 10:46	(Norway) (Germany) ECOMA 2008-3	Andøya / DLR	Suborbital	Aeronomy	12 July	Successful
12 July; 10:46	Apogee: 123 kilometres (76 mi)					
14 July; 10:10	(United States) Terrier-Orion		(United States) Wallops Island LP-1		(United States) NASA	
14 July; 10:10	(United States) SubTEC-II	NASA / Wallops	Suborbital	Technology demonstration	14 July	Successful
18 July; 22:47	(United States) UGM-27 Polaris (STARS		(United States) Kodiak Island		(United States) U.S. Air Force	
18 July; 22:47	(United States) FTX-03	MDA	Suborbital	Target	18 July	Successful
18 July; 22:47	Radar targeting test only, missile not intercepted					
1 August	(Russia) R-29		(Russia) Ryazan, Barents Sea		(Russia) VMF	
1 August		VMF	Suborbital	Missile test	1 August	Successful
2 August; 08:30	(Japan) S-520		(Japan) Uchinoura		(Japan) JAXA	
2 August; 08:30		JAXA/Teikyo	Suborbital	Microgravity	2 August	Successful
2 August; 08:30	Apogee: 293 kilometres (182 mi)					
13 August; 08:01	(United States) LGM-30G Minuteman III		(United States) Vandenberg		(United States) U.S. Air Force	
13 August; 08:01	(United States) GT-195GM	U.S. Air Force	Suborbital	Missile test	13 August	Successful
13 August; 08:01	Travelled about 6,790 kilometres (4,220 mi) downrange.					
22 August; 09:10	(United States) ALV		(United States) MARS LP-0B		(United States) Alliant Techsystems	
22 August; 09:10	(United States) SOAREX-VI	NASA	Suborbital	Technology demonstration	T+27 seconds	Launch failure
22 August; 09:10	(United States) Hy-BoLT	NASA	Suborbital	Aerodynamics	T+27 seconds	Launch failure
22 August; 09:10	Only flight of ALV, veered off course to the South and destroyed by RSO					
25 August	(United States) UGM-133 Trident II		(United States) USS Louisiana, Pacific Ocean		(United States) U.S. Navy	
25 August		U.S. Navy	Suborbital	Missile test	25 August	Successful
25 August	(United States) UGM-133 Trident II		(United States) USS Louisiana, Pacific Ocean		(United States) U.S. Navy	
25 August		U.S. Navy	Suborbital	Missile test	25 August	Successful
28 August	(Russia) RT-2PM Topol (RS-12M)		(Russia) Plesetsk		(Russia) RVSN RF	
28 August		RVSN RF	Suborbital	Missile test	28 August	Successful
18 September; 02:05		FTT-10	(United States) Kauai		(United States) MDA	
18 September; 02:05		MDA	Suborbital	Target	18 September	Launch failure
18 September; 02:05	Two THAAD intercept launches cancelled.					
18 September; 14:45	(Russia) RSM-56 Bulava (R-30)		(Russia) Dmitri Donskoi, White Sea		(Russia) VMF	
18 September; 14:45		VMF	Suborbital	Missile test	15:05	Successful
24 September; 06:57	(United States) Chimera (Minuteman/Minotaur II)		(United States) Vandenberg LF-06		(United States) Orbital Sciences	
24 September; 06:57	(United States) NFIRE 2b	MDA	Suborbital	Target	24 September	Successful
24 September; 06:57	Tracked by NFIRE satellite					
=== October-December ===
11 October	(Russia) R-29RMU Sineva		(Russia) Tula, Barents Sea		(Russia) VMF	
11 October		VMF	Suborbital	Missile test	11 October	Successful
11 October	Long-range test					
12 October; 07:24	(Russia) RT-2PM Topol (RS-12M)		(Russia) Plesetsk		(Russia) RVSN RF	
12 October; 07:24		RVSN RF	Suborbital	Missile test	07:50	Successful
12 October	(Russia) R-29R Vysota		(Russia) Zelenograd, Sea of Okhotsk		(Russia) VMF	
12 October		VMF	Suborbital	Missile test	12 October	Successful
12 October	(Russia) R-29RM Shtil		(Russia) Yekaterinburg, Barents Sea		(Russia) VMF	
12 October		VMF	Suborbital	Missile test	12 October	Successful
20 October; 08:39	(Canada) Black Brant IX		(United States) White Sands LC-36		(United States) NASA	
20 October; 08:39		NRL	Suborbital	UV Astronomy	08:49	Successful
22 October; 09:10	(Russia) RS-18 UR-100N		(Kazakhstan) Baikonur		(Russia) RVSN RF	
22 October; 09:10		RVSN RF	Suborbital	Missile test	22 October	Successful
22 October; 12:30	(United States) Nike-Orion		(Sweden) Esrange		(Sweden) (Germany) EuroLaunch	
22 October; 12:30	(Sweden) (Germany) REXUS-4	SSC / DLR	Suborbital	Student research	22 October	Successful
22 October; 12:30	Apogee: 175 kilometres (109 mi)					
1 November		Pacific Blitz	(United States) Barking Sands		(United States) U.S. Navy	
1 November		U.S. Navy	Suborbital	Target	1 November	Successful
1 November	Intercepted by SM-3 missile, part of Pacific Blitz exercise					
1 November	(United States) RIM-161 SM-3	Pacific Blitz	(United States) USS Paul Hamilton, Pacific Ocean		(United States) U.S. Navy	
1 November		U.S. Navy	Suborbital	Intercept test	1 November	Successful
1 November	Intercepted target missile, part of Pacific Blitz exercise					
1 November		Pacific Blitz	(United States) Barking Sands		(United States) U.S. Navy	
1 November		U.S. Navy	Suborbital	Target	1 November	Successful
1 November	Intercept by SM-3 missile failed. Part of Pacific Blitz exercise					
1 November	(United States) RIM-161 SM-3	Pacific Blitz	(United States) USS Hopper, Pacific Ocean		(United States) U.S. Navy	
1 November		U.S. Navy	Suborbital	Intercept test	1 November	Spacecraft failure
1 November	Sensor fault resulted in failure to intercept target missile. Part of Pacific Blitz exercise					
5 November; 09:00	(United States) LGM-30G Minuteman III		(United States) Vandenberg		(United States) U.S. Air Force	
5 November; 09:00	(United States) GT-198GM	U.S. Air Force	Suborbital	Missile test	5 November	Successful
5 November; 09:00	Travelled 6,740 kilometres (4,190 mi) downrange					
12 November; 05:56	(India) Shaurya		(India) Integrated Test Range LC-3		(India) DRDO	
12 November; 05:56		Indian Army	Suborbital	Missile test	12 November	Successful
12 November	(Iran) Sejjil		Iran		(Iran) IRGC AF	
12 November		IRGC AF	Suborbital	Missile test	12 November	Successful
12 November	Maiden flight of Sejjil missile					
13 November; 09:06	(France) M51		(France) CEL		(France) FOST	
13 November; 09:06		FOST	Suborbital	Missile test	13 November	Successful
14 November	(Canada) Black Brant IX		(United States) White Sands LC-36		(United States) NASA	
14 November		NRL	Suborbital	Solar	14 November	Successful
19 November; 02:18		JFTM-2	(United States) Barking Sands		(United States) U.S. Navy	
19 November; 02:18		U.S. Navy / JMSDF	Suborbital	Target	19 November	Successful
19 November; 02:18	Intercept by SM-3 missile failed					
19 November; 02:21	(United States) RIM-161 SM-3	JFTM-2	(Japan) JDS Chōkai, Pacific Ocean		(Japan) JMSDF	
19 November; 02:21		JMSDF	Suborbital	Interceptor	19 November	Spacecraft failure
19 November; 02:21	Infrared sensor fault, failed to intercept target					
26 November; 13:24	(Russia) RS-24 Yars		(Russia) Plesetsk		(Russia) RVSN RF	
26 November; 13:24		RVSN RF	Suborbital	Missile test	26 November	Successful
26 November	(Iran) Kavoshgar-2		(Iran) Semnan		(Iran) ISA	
26 November	(Iran) Kavoshgar-2	ISA	Suborbital	Test flight	26 November	Successful
26 November	Payload recovered by parachute					
28 November	(Russia) RSM-56 Bulava (R-30)		(Russia) Dmitri Donskoi, White Sea		(Russia) VMF	
28 November		VMF	Suborbital	Missile test	28 November	Successful
5 December; 10:35:10	(Brazil) (United States) VS-30-Orion		(Norway) SvalRak		(Norway) Andøya	
5 December; 10:35:10	(Norway) ICI-2	Oslo	Suborbital	Auroral	10:45	Successful
5 December; 10:35:10	Apogee: 330 kilometres (210 mi)					
5 December; 20:04	(United States) UGM-27 Polaris (STARS)	FTG-05	(United States) Kodiak Island		(United States) U.S. Air Force	
5 December; 20:04		MDA	Suborbital	Target	20:29	Partial spacecraft failure
5 December; 20:04	Decoy target failed to deploy, intercepted by GBI					
5 December; 20:21	(United States) Ground Based Interceptor	FTG-05	(United States) Vandenberg		(United States) U.S. Air Force	
5 December; 20:21		MDA	Suborbital	Target	20:29	Successful
5 December; 20:21	Intercepted Polaris					
23 December; 03:00	(Russia) RSM-56 Bulava		(Russia) Dmitry Donskoi		(Russia) VMF	
23 December; 03:00		VMF	Suborbital	Missile test	23 December	Launch failure
23 December; 03:00	Self-destruct system activated after missile went off course.					

- ← Jan
- Feb
- Mar
- Apr
- May
- Jun
- Jul
- Aug
- Sep
- Oct
- Nov
- Dec →

== Deep Space Rendezvous ==
Date (GMT)	Spacecraft	Event	Remarks
5 January	Cassini	40th flyby of Titan	Closest approach: 1,010 kilometres (630 mi)
14 January	MESSENGER	1st flyby of Mercury	Closest approach: 200 kilometres (120 mi) at 19:04 GMT
22 February	Cassini	41st flyby of Titan	Closest approach: 1,000 kilometres (620 mi)
12 March	Cassini	3rd flyby of Enceladus	Closest approach: 52 kilometres (32 mi)
25 March	Cassini	42nd flyby of Titan	Closest approach: 1,000 kilometres (620 mi)
12 May	Cassini	43rd flyby of Titan	Closest approach: 1,000 kilometres (620 mi)
25 May	Phoenix	Landing on Mars	Region D, Arctic area - Green Valley, near the Heimdal crater: 68.2188°N 125.7492°W. Touchdown at 23:38 GMT. Successful
28 May	Cassini	44th flyby of Titan	Closest approach: 1,400 kilometres (870 mi)
31 July	Cassini	45th flyby of Titan	Closest approach: 1,613 kilometres (1,002 mi)
11 August	Cassini	4th flyby of Enceladus	Closest approach: 54 kilometres (34 mi)
5 September	Rosetta	Flyby of 2867 Šteins	Closest approach: 800 kilometres (500 mi)
6 October	MESSENGER	2nd flyby of Mercury	
9 October	Cassini	5th flyby of Enceladus	Closest approach: 25 kilometres (16 mi)
31 October	Cassini	6th flyby of Enceladus	Closest approach: 200 kilometres (120 mi)
3 November	Cassini	46th flyby of Titan	Closest approach: 1,100 kilometres (680 mi)
8 November	Chandrayaan-1	Injection into Selenocentric orbit	Periselene: 504 kilometres (313 mi), Aposelene: 7,502 kilometres (4,662 mi)
14 November	MIP	Landing on the Moon	Lunar Impactor
19 November	Cassini	47th flyby of Titan	Closest approach: 1,023 kilometres (636 mi)
5 December	Cassini	48th flyby of Titan	Closest approach: 960 kilometres (600 mi)
21 December	Cassini	49th flyby of Titan	Closest approach: 970 kilometres (600 mi)

Distant, non-targeted flybys of Dione, Enceladus, Mimas, Tethys and Titan by Cassini occurred throughout the year.

== EVAs ==
Start date/time	Duration	End time	Spacecraft	Crew	Function	Remarks
30 January; 09:56	7 hours 10 minutes	17:06	Expedition 16 (ISS Quest)	(United States) Peggy Whitson (United States) Daniel M. Tani	Replace motor and bearing in solar array joint	
11 February; 14:13	7 hours 58 minutes	22:11	STS-122 (ISS Quest)	(United States) Rex J. Walheim (United States) Stanley G. Love	Install Power Data Grapple Fixture on Columbus	Originally to have been conducted by Walheim and Hans Schlegel, Love replaced Schlegel on medical grounds.
13 February; 14:27	6 hours 45 minutes	21:12	STS-122 (ISS Quest)	(United States) Rex J. Walheim (Germany) Hans Schlegel	Replace depleted nitrogen tank	
15 February; 12:07	7 hours 25 minutes	20:32	STS-122 (ISS Quest)	(United States) Rex J. Walheim (United States) Stanley G. Love	Install experiments on Columbus, load failed gyroscope onto Shuttle for return to Earth	
14 March; 01:18	7 hours 1 minute	08:19	STS-123 (ISS Quest)	(United States) Richard M. Linnehan (United States) Garrett Reisman	Install Kibo ELM-PS and start Dextre assembly	
15 March; 23:49	7 hours 8 minutes	16 March; 06:57	STS-123 (ISS Quest)	(United States) Richard M. Linnehan (United States) Michael Foreman	Dextre assembly	
17 March; 22:52	6 hours 53 minutes	18 March; 05:44	STS-123 (ISS Quest)	(United States) Richard M. Linnehan (United States) Robert L. Behnken	Dextre assembly, install MISSE-6 experiment, and store spare parts outside the ISS	MISSE installation failed
20 March; 22:04	6 hours 24 minutes	21 March; 04:08	STS-123 (ISS Quest)	(United States) Robert L. Behnken (United States) Michael Foreman	Test heat shield repair techniques	
22 March; 20:34	6 hours 2 minutes	23 March; 02:36	STS-123 (ISS Quest)	(United States) Robert L. Behnken (United States) Michael Foreman	Store OBSS on ISS, retry MISSE-6 installation	
3 June; 16:22	6 hours 48 minutes	23:10	STS-124 (ISS Quest)	(United States) Mike Fossum (United States) Ron Garan	Install JEM Pressurised Module, Inspect SARJ, retrieve OBSS.	
5 June; 15:04	7 hours 11 minutes	22:15	STS-124 (ISS Quest)	(United States) Mike Fossum (United States) Ron Garan	Adjust covers on JEM, Inspect SARJ.	
8 June; 13:55	6 hours 33 minutes	20:28	STS-124 (ISS Quest)	(United States) Mike Fossum (United States) Ron Garan	Replace nitrogen tank, inspect SARJ.	
10 July; 18:48	6 hours 18 minutes	11 July; 01:06	Expedition 17 (ISS Pirs)	(Russia) Sergei Volkov (Russia) Oleg Kononenko	Remove pyrotechnic bolt from Soyuz TMA-12 for inspection.	
15 July; 17:08	5 hours 54 minutes	23:02	Expedition 17 (ISS Pirs)	(Russia) Sergei Volkov (Russia) Oleg Kononenko	Install docking targeting equipment, rotate exposed experiments	
27 September; 08:38	22 minutes	09:00	Shenzhou 7	(China) Zhai Zhigang (full) (China) Liu Boming (stand-up)	Test spacesuit, collect experiment	First Chinese EVA
18 November; 18:09	6 hours 52 minutes	19 November; 01:01	STS-126 (ISS Quest)	(United States) Heidemarie Stefanyshyn-Piper (United States) Stephen G. Bowen	Transferred an empty nitrogen tank assembly from ESP3 to the shuttle's cargo bay, transferred a new flex hose rotary coupler to ESP3 for future use, removed an insulation cover on the Kibo Exposed Facility berthing mechanism, began cleaning and lubrication of the starboard SARJ, and replacement of its 11 trundle bearing assemblies.	
20 November; 17:58	6 hours 45 minutes	21 November; 00:43	STS-126 (ISS Quest)	(United States) Heidemarie Stefanyshyn-Piper (United States) Robert S. Kimbrough	Relocated the two CETA carts from the starboard side of the Mobile Transporter to the port side, lubricated the station robotic arm's latching end effector A snare bearings, continued cleaning and lubrication of the starboard SARJ	Conducted on tenth anniversary of the launch of the ISS
22 November; 18:01	6 hours 57 minutes	23 November; 00:58	STS-126 (ISS Quest)	(United States) Heidemarie Stefanyshyn-Piper (United States) Stephen G. Bowen	Completed cleaning and lubrication of all but one of the trundle bearing assemblies (TBA) on the starboard SARJ.	
24 November; 18:24	6 hours 7 minutes	25 November; 00:31	STS-126 (ISS Quest)	(United States) Stephen G. Bowen (United States) Robert S. Kimbrough	Completed replacement of trundle bearing assemblies on starboard SARJ, lubricated the port SARJ, installed a video camera, re-installed insulation covers on the Kibo External Facility berthing mechanism, performed Kibo robotic arm grounding tab maintenance, installed spacewalk handrails on Kibo, installed Global Positioning Satellite (GPS) antennae on Kibo, photographed radiators, and photographed trailing umbilical system cables.	
23 December; 00:51	5 hours 38 minutes	06:29	Expedition 18 (ISS Pirs)	(United States) Michael Fincke (Russia) Yuri Lonchakov	Install Langmuir probe, EXPOSE-R and IPI-SM experiments.	EXPOSE-R installation failed

== Orbital launch statistics ==
=== By country ===
For the purposes of this section, the yearly tally of orbital launches by country assigns each flight to the country of origin of the rocket, not to the launch services provider or the spaceport.

Country	Launches	Successes	Failures	Partial failures
China	11	11	0	0
France	6	6	0	0
India	3	2	0	1
Iran	1 (Note: First orbital launch attempt)	0	1	0
Japan	1	1	0	0
Russia	24	23	0	1
Ukraine	8	8	0	0
United States	15	14	1	0
World	69	65	2	2

=== By rocket ===
- Ariane 5
- Atlas V
- Delta II
- Delta IV
- Delta IV Heavy
- Falcon 1
- Long March 2
- Long March 3
- Long March 4
- Pegasus
- PSLV
- Molniya-M
- Soyuz-U
- Soyuz-FG
- Soyuz-2
- Kosmos-3M
- Dnepr
- Space Shuttle
- Proton-K
- Proton-M
- Rokot
- Zenit-3SL/SLB
- Others

==== By family ====
Family	Country	Launches	Successes	Failures	Partial failures	Remarks
Ariane	France	6	6	0	0	
Atlas	United States	2	2	0	0	
Delta	United States	5	5	0	0	
Falcon	United States	2	1	1	0	
H-II	Japan	1	1	0	0	
Long March	China	11	11	0	0	
Pegasus	United States	2	2	0	0	
PSLV	India	3	3	0	0	
R-7	Russia	10	10	0	0	
R-14	Russia	3	3	0	0	
R-36	Ukraine	2	2	0	0	
Safir	Iran	1	0	1	0	Maiden flight
Space Shuttle	United States	4	4	0	0	
Universal Rocket	Russia	11	10	0	1	
Zenit	Ukraine	6	6	0	0	

==== By type ====
Rocket	Country	Family	Launches	Successes	Failures	Partial failures	Remarks
Ariane 5	France	Ariane	6	6	0	0	
Atlas V	United States	Atlas	2	2	0	0	
Delta II	United States	Delta	5	5	0	0	
Dnepr	Ukraine	R-36	2	2	0	0	
H-IIA	Japan	H-II	1	1	0	0	
Falcon 1	United States	Falcon	2	1	1	0	
Kosmos	Russia	R-12/R-14	3	3	0	0	
Long March 2	China	Long March	4	4	0	0	
Long March 3	China	Long March	4	4	0	0	
Long March 4	China	Long March	3	3	0	0	
Molniya	Russia	R-7	1	1	0	0	
Pegasus	United States	Pegasus	2	2	0	0	
PSLV	India	PSLV	3	3	0	0	
Proton	Russia	Universal Rocket	10	9	0	1	
Safir	Iran	Safir	1	0	1	0	Maiden flight
Soyuz	Russia	R-7	8	8	0	0	
Soyuz-2	Russia	R-7	1	1	0	0	
Space Shuttle	United States	Space Shuttle	4	4	0	0	
UR-100	Russia	Universal Rocket	1	1	0	0	
Zenit	Ukraine	Zenit	6	6	0	0	

==== By configuration ====
Rocket	Country	Type	Launches	Successes	Failures	Partial failures	Remarks
Ariane 5 ES	France	Ariane 5	1	1	0	0	Maiden flight
Ariane 5 ECA	France	Ariane 5	5	5	0	0	
Atlas V 411	United States	Atlas V	1	1	0	0	
Atlas V 421	United States	Atlas V	1	1	0	0	
Delta II 7320	United States	Delta II	1	1	0	0	
Delta II 7420	United States	Delta II	2	2	0	0	
Delta II 7920H	United States	Delta II	1	1	0	0	
Delta II 7925	United States	Delta II	1	1	0	0	
Dnepr	Ukraine	Dnepr	2	2	0	0	
H-IIA 2024	Japan	H-IIA	1	1	0	0	
Falcon 1	United States	Falcon 1	2	1	1	0	First successful launch
Kosmos-3M	Russia	Kosmos	3	3	0	0	
Long March 2C	China	Long March 2	1	1	0	0	
Long March 2D	China	Long March 2	2	2	0	0	
Long March 2F	China	Long March 2	1	1	0	0	
Long March 3A	China	Long March 3	1	1	0	0	
Long March 3B	China	Long March 3	1	1	0	0	
Long March 3B/E	China	Long March 3	1	1	0	0	
Long March 3C	China	Long March 3	1	1	0	0	Maiden flight
Long March 4B	China	Long March 4	2	2	0	0	
Long March 4C	China	Long March 4	1	1	0	0	
Molniya-M / 2BL	Russia	Molniya	1	1	0	0	
Pegasus-XL	United States	Pegasus	2	2	0	0	
Proton-K / DM-2	Russia	Proton	1	1	0	0	
Proton-M / DM-2	Russia	Proton	2	2	0	0	
Proton-M / Briz-M	Russia	Proton	7	6	0	1	
PSLV-CA	India	PSLV	2	2	0	0	
PSLV-XL	India	PSLV	1	1	0	0	Maiden flight
Rokot / Briz-KM	Russia	UR-100	1	1	0	0	
Safir	Iran	Safir	1	0	1	0	Maiden flight
Soyuz-2.1b	Russia	Soyuz-2	1	1	0	0	
Soyuz-FG	Russia	Soyuz	2	2	0	0	
Soyuz-FG / Fregat	Russia	Soyuz	1	1	0	0	
Soyuz-U	Russia	Soyuz	5	5	0	0	
Space Shuttle	United States	Space Shuttle	4	4	0	0	
Zenit-3SL	Ukraine	Zenit	5	5	0	0	
Zenit-3SLB	Ukraine	Zenit	1	1	0	0	Maiden flight

=== By launch site ===
- Jiuquan
- Taiyuan
- Xichang
- Kourou
- Satish Dhawan
- Ocean Odyssey
- Semnan
- Tanegashima
- Baikonour
- Kwajalein
- Dombarovsky
- Kapustin Yar
- Plesetsk
- Cape Canaveral
- Kennedy
- Vandenberg

Site	Country	Launches	Successes	Failures	Partial failures	Remarks
Baikonur	Kazakhstan	19	18	0	1	
Cape Canaveral	United States	3	3	0	0	
Dombarovsky	Russia	1	1	0	0	
Jiuquan	China	3	3	0	0	
Kapustin Yar	Russia	1	1	0	0	
Kennedy	United States	4	4	0	0	
Kwajalein	Marshall Islands	4	3	1	0	Two launches used Stargazer aircraft
Kourou	France	6	6	0	0	
Ocean Odyssey	(United Nations) International	5	5	0	0	
Plesetsk	Russia	6	6	0	0	
Satish Dhawan	India	3	3	0	0	
Semnan	Iran	1	0	1	0	First orbital launch attempt
Taiyuan	China	4	4	0	0	
Tanegashima	Japan	1	1	0	0	
Vandenberg	United States	4	4	0	0	
Xichang	China	4	4	0	0	
Total		69	66	2	1	

=== By orbit ===
- Transatmospheric
- Low Earth
- Low Earth (ISS)
- Low Earth (SSO)
- Low Earth (retrograde)
- Medium Earth
- Geosychronous
  (transfer)
- Inclined GSO
- High Earth
- Heliocentric

Orbital regime	Launches	Successes	Failures	Accidentally achieved	Remarks
Transatmospheric	0	0	0	0	
Low Earth	36	34	2	0	11 to ISS
Medium Earth / Molniya	6	6	0	0	
Geosynchronous / GTO	25	25	0	0	
High Earth / Lunar transfer	2	2	0	0	
Heliocentric / Planetary transfer	0	0	0	0	
Total	69	67	2	0	

== See also ==
- List of human spaceflights, 2000-present
- Suborbital spaceflight in 2008
- Timeline of spaceflight
