= Kosmos 2446 =

Russian military early warning satellite

- Mission type: Early warning
- COSPAR ID: 2008-062A
- SATCAT no.: 33447
- Mission duration: 4 years

Spacecraft properties
- Spacecraft type: US-K
- Launch mass: 1,900 kilograms (4,200 lb)

Start of mission
- Launch date: 2 December 2008, 05:03 UTC
- Rocket: Molniya-M/2BL
- Launch site: Plesetsk Cosmodrome

End of mission
- Decay date: May 6th, 2017

Orbital parameters
- Reference system: Geocentric
- Regime: Molniya
- Perigee altitude: 522 kilometres (324 mi)
- Apogee altitude: 39,190 kilometres (24,350 mi)
- Inclination: 62.8 degrees
- Period: 704.78 minutes

Kosmos 2446 (Russian: Космос 2446 meaning Cosmos 2446) is a Russian US-K missile early warning satellite which was launched in 2008 as part of the Russian Space Forces' Oko programme. The satellite is designed to identify missile launches using optical telescopes and infrared sensors.

Kosmos 2446 was launched from Site 16/2 at Plesetsk Cosmodrome in Russia. A Molniya-M carrier rocket with a 2BL upper stage was used to perform the launch, which took place at 05:03 UTC on 2 December 2008. The launch successfully placed the satellite into a molniya orbit. It subsequently received its Kosmos designation, and the international designator 2008-062A. The United States Space Command assigned it the Satellite Catalog Number 33447.

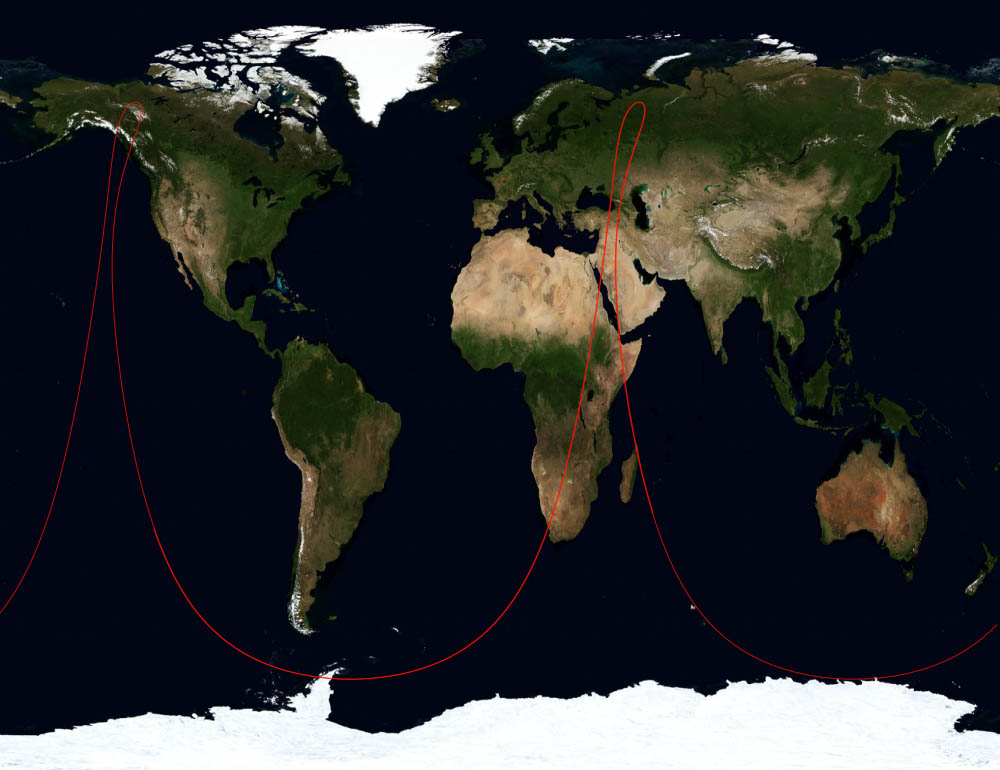
Ground track of Kosmos 2446

== See also ==
- List of Kosmos satellites (2251–2500)
- List of R-7 launches (2005–2009)
- 2008 in spaceflight
