= RapidEye =

German geospatial information provider

BlackBridge
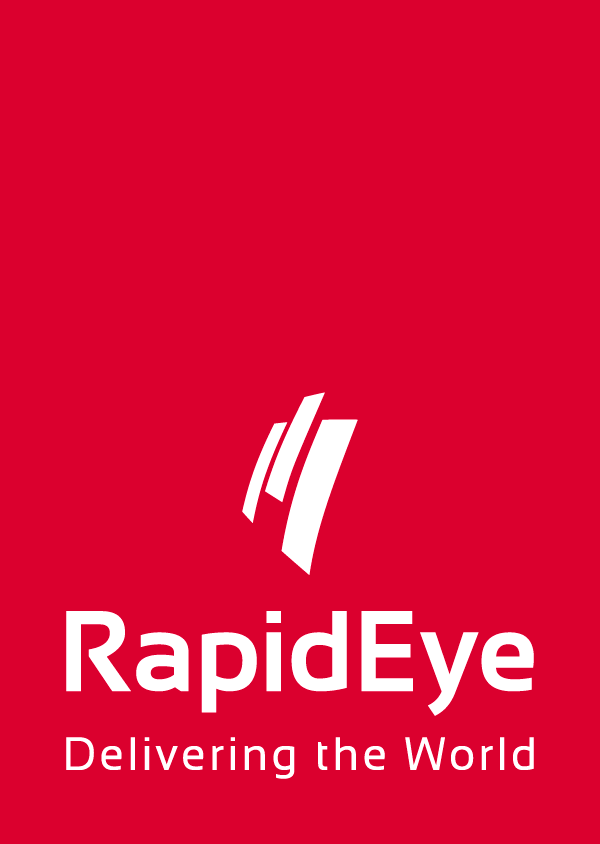
- Company type: Corporation
- Industry: Earth observation
- Founded: 1998
- Defunct: 6 November 2013
- Headquarters: Berlin, Germany
- Area served: Worldwide
- Key people: Dr. Manfred Krischke, founder
- Number of employees: ~110
- Website: BlackBridge.com/rapideye

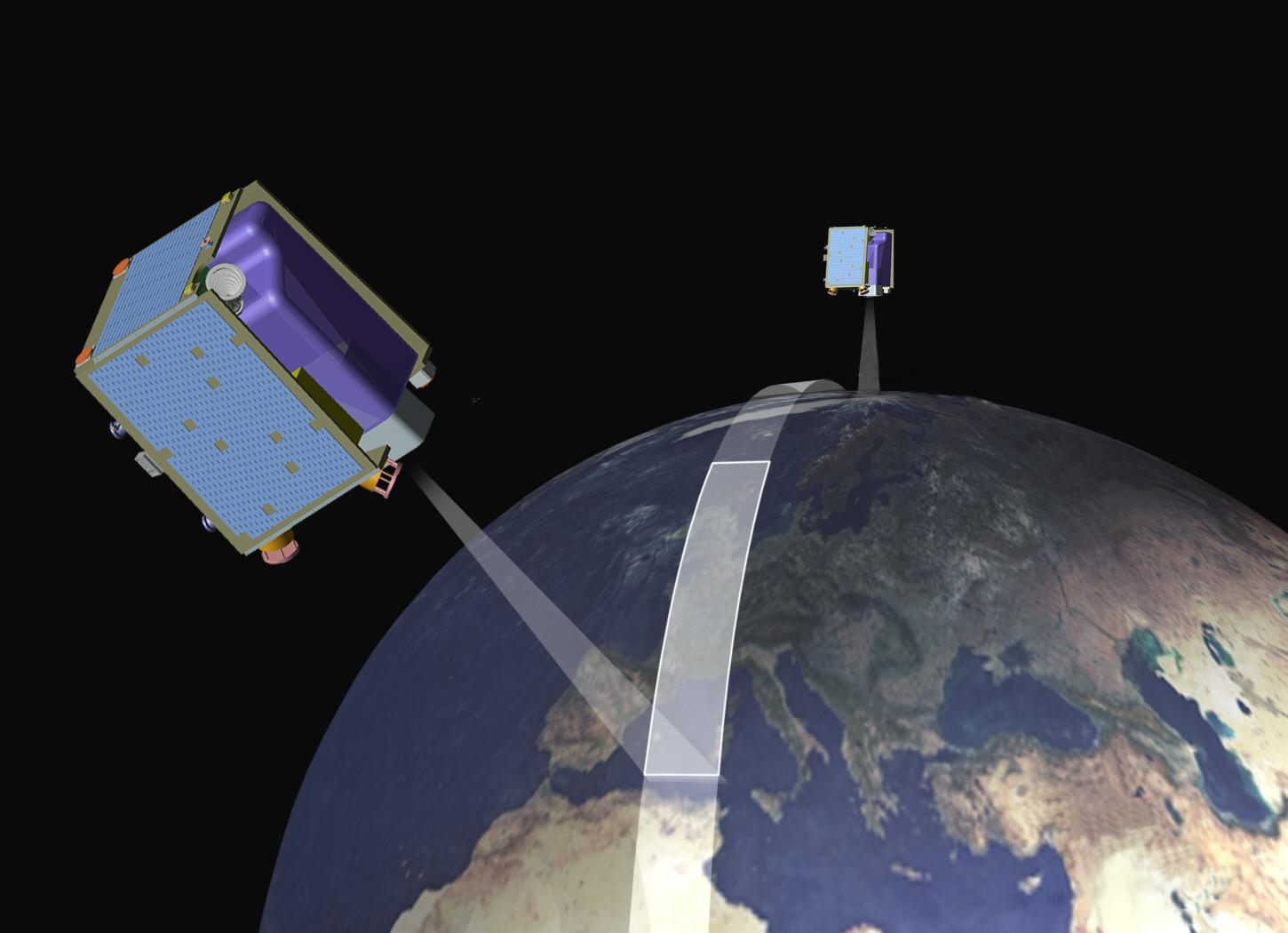
Two of 5 RapidEye satellites

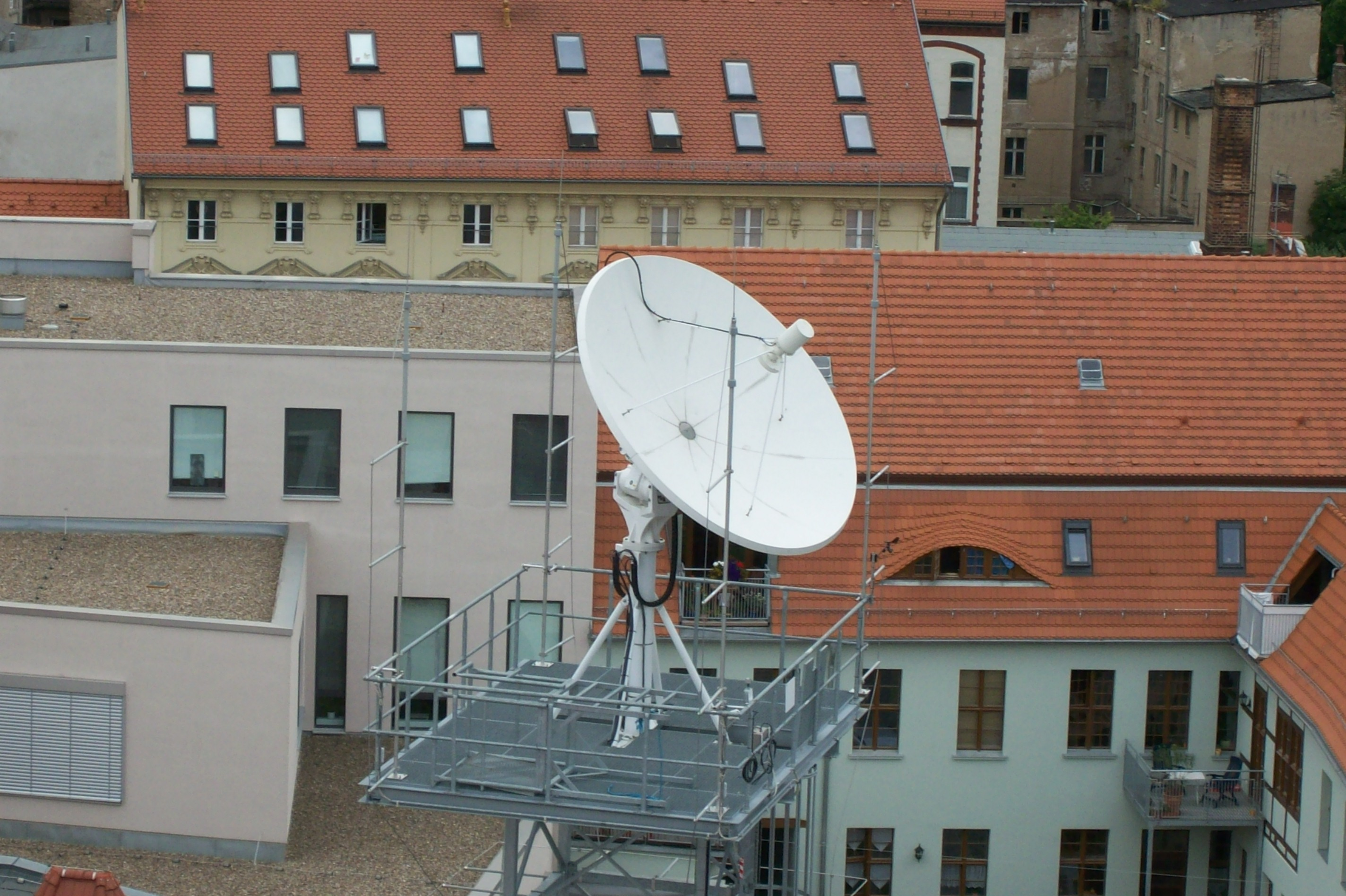
RapidEye's S-band antenna

RapidEye AG was a German geospatial information provider focused on assisting in management decision-making through services based on their own Earth-observation imagery. The company operated a five-satellite constellation producing 5-meter resolution imagery that was designed and implemented by MacDonald Dettwiler (now MDA) of Richmond, Canada.

Today, RapidEye refers to the constellation of 5 Earth-observation satellites owned by Planet Labs. The RapidEye constellation was retired by Planet Labs in 2020.

== History ==
1996: The RapidEye business concept was designed by Kayser-Threde GmbH, based on a call for ideas from the DLR (German Aerospace Agency), on how to commercialize remote sensing in Germany.

1998: RapidEye was established as an independent company in Munich with seed financing from a few private investors and Vereinigte Hagelversicherung, a German agricultural insurance provider.

2004: In 2004, funding was secured for the RapidEye satellite constellation and ground segment with the help of the European Union, the State of Brandenburg (Germany), a banking consortium consisting of Commerzbank, EDC (Export Development Canada) and KfW Banking Group. Through a contract with the CCC (Canadian Commercial Corporation) MDA was awarded the contract as the prime contractor to build RapidEye's satellite system. Originally located in Munich, the company relocated 60 km southwest of Berlin to Brandenburg an der Havel in 2004.

2008: RapidEye earned ISO 9001:2000 certification in April from TÜV Nord. On 29 August 2008, a Dnepr rocket (a refurbished ICBM), was successfully launched from Baikonur in Kazakhstan, carrying RapidEye's constellation of five Earth-observation satellites designed and implemented by MacDonald Dettwiler (now MDA) of Richmond, Canada.

2009: After the satellites completed their MPAR phase (consisting of testing and calibration) they became commercially operational in February 2009.

2011: RapidEye files for bankruptcy protection on 30 May.

2011: Blackbridge Ltd. of Lethbridge, Alberta, Canada acquired RapidEye AG on 29 August.

2012: On 18 December 2012 the company announced that it has successfully relocated the company headquarters to Berlin, Germany.

2013: On 6 November 2013 RapidEye officially changed its name to BlackBridge.

2014: Blackbridge Ltd. announced a new constellation called RapidEye+. The constellation was never developed.

2015: Planet Labs acquired RapidEye.

2020: In April 2020, Planet Labs retired the RapidEye constellation.

== Satellites ==
The constellation consisted of the following satellites: RapidEye 1 (codename Tachys, COSPAR 2008-040C), RapidEye 2 (codename Mati, COSPAR 2008-040A), RapidEye 3 (codename Choma, COSPAR 2008-040D), RapidEye 4 (codename Choros, COSPAR 2008-040E), and RapidEye 5 (codename Trochia, COSPAR 2008-040B). All five satellites were launched simultaneously on a Dnepr rocket on 28 August 2008. All of the satellites share a common orbit; they are separated in orbit by 19-minute intervals.

Five identical satellites are built by Surrey Satellite Technology Ltd. (SSTL) of Guildford, subcontracted by MacDonald Dettwiler (MDA). Each satellite was based on an evolution of the flight-proven SSTL-100 bus, measured less than one cubic meter, and weighed 150 kg (bus + payload).

Each of RapidEye's five satellites contained identical sensors, were equally calibrated, and traveled on the same orbital plane (at an altitude of 630 km). Together, the five satellites were capable of collecting over 4 million km^{2} of 5 m resolution, 5-band color imagery every day.

The Jena-Optronik multi-spectral imager, the Jena Spaceborne Scanner JSS 56, was a pushbroom sensor carried on each satellite. Each sensor was capable of collecting image data in five distinct bands of the electromagnetic spectrum: blue (440–510 nm), green (520–590 nm), red (630–690 nm), red-edge (690–730 nm) and near-infrared (760–880 nm). The nominal resolution on the ground was 6.5 meters, corresponding to NIIRS 2.

RapidEye's satellites were the first commercial satellites to include the red-edge band, which is sensitive to changes in chlorophyll content. Studies show that this band can assist in monitoring vegetation health, improve species separation, and help in measuring protein and nitrogen content in biomass.

== Technical specifications ==
Overview

- Number of satellites: 5
- Spacecraft lifetime: 7 years
- Orbit altitude: 630 km in Sun-synchronous orbit
- Global revisit time: Daily (off-nadir) / 5.5 days (at nadir)
- Inclination: 97.8° (solar-synchron)
- Equator crossing time: 11:00 am local time (approximately)
- Ground sampling distance (nadir): 6,5 m
- Pixel size (orthorectified): 5 m
- Visual radiometric resolution: 8 bit
- Analytic radiometric resolution: 16 bit
- Swath width: 77 km
- On-board data storage: Up to 1500 km of image data per orbit
- Image capture capacity: 5 million km^{2} per day

Sensor performance specifications
440–510 nm (blue)
520–590 nm (green)
630–685 nm (red)
690–730 nm (red edge)
760–850 nm (near IR)

== Applications ==
Imagery from the RapidEye constellation provided geospatial information to the following industries:

Agriculture – The RapidEye constellation was capable of field based, regional or global scale agricultural monitoring on a frequent revisit cycle. The information derived from the imagery could assist farmers in precision farming operations, agricultural insurers in damage assessment and risk management, or governments in food security and environmental compliance monitoring.

Forestry – Satellite-based information is increasingly being used by governments and commercial operators to assess forest status, evaluate management strategies, measure the environmental and economical sustainability of forest operations, and monitor illegal logging and deforestation.

Security and emergency – Fast turnaround of imagery showing current ground conditions following a natural or man-made disaster is essential for crisis management authorities in assessing the situation and better coordinating rescue teams.

Environment – Satellite imagery can provide valuable information to governmental agencies or industries that monitor the environmental impact of human activities.

Spatial solutions – RapidEye satellite imagery was used as background imagery for a variety of purposes including mapping, navigation, flight simulation, gaming and as an integral component in geospecific 3D modeling.

Energy and infrastructure – The RapidEye constellation was used to monitor pipeline and transmission corridors and identify problems on the ground such as vegetation encroachment, nearby buildings, development of roads, and leaks. It provided land cover and land use classification data to telecommunication firms to assist in planning their antenna network.
