= Mareta West =

American astrogeologist

- Born: August 9, 1915
- Died: November 2, 1998 (aged 83)

Mareta Nelle West (August 9, 1915 – November 2, 1998) was an American astrogeologist who in the 1960s chose the site of the first crewed lunar landing, Apollo 11. She was the first female astrogeologist. Her cremated remains were launched into space.

== Early life ==
West was born August 9, 1915, in Elk City, Oklahoma, to Luther and Myrtie West. West was a third-generation Oklahoman, her grandparents having moved to Indian Territory in 1889. She moved to Oklahoma City as a child and graduated from Classen High School. She earned her bachelor's degree in geology from the University of Oklahoma in 1937, where she was a member of Kappa Kappa Gamma sorority.

West married Albert Reichard on April 21, 1939. They had divorced by the time of the 1940 United States Census.

== Career ==
In the 1940s, West worked as a petroleum geologist in the oil and gas industry. She worked in Oklahoma City for eleven years before joining the United States Geological Survey in Flagstaff, Arizona, in 1964, two years after the agency was founded. She was the first woman astrogeologist. She was elected as a Fellow of the American Association for the Advancement of Science in 1966.

West was the only woman on the Geology Experiment Team for Apollo 11. She chose the site of the first crewed lunar landing, and worked on selection of landing sites for subsequent Apollo missions.

She continued to work on lunar and Martian geography into the 1970s, writing and co-writing several articles and publications. After retirement, West moved back to Oklahoma City, where she actively participated in community and philanthropic causes. She died on November 2, 1998.

== Cremated remains launched into space ==
Her cremated remains were launched into space aboard a SpaceLoft-XL rocket on April 28, 2007, as part of the first commercial attempt to launch human remains for lunar "burial". This was a sub-orbital launch, and the cremains were recovered afterwards. A second attempt to launch the cremains was made on August 2, 2008, aboard a Falcon 1 rocket. The intended destination of this flight was low Earth orbit, but the rocket failed two minutes after launch.

== Publications ==
- Nuclear Power Reactor Sites in the Southeastern United States, 1978.
- West Side of the Moon
