= Great Prophet III =

2008 Iranian missile tests and war games

Great Prophet III (Payambar-e Azam 3; Persian: پیامبر اعظم 3) was an Iranian missile test and war games exercise, conducted by Iran's Islamic Revolutionary Guards. It began in the early morning of 9 July 2008, when Iran claimed nine missiles were simultaneously test-fired, including a long-range Shahab-3. Further tests, which one report claimed included another Shahab-3 launch, were conducted on 10 July. The exercise was reported to be a response to Israeli and American military exercises which the Iranian government believed to be related to a proposed attack on facilities related to Iran's nuclear programmes.

The commander of the Iran's Revolutionary Guards' air force, Hossein Salami, said that the test proved that "our missiles are ready for shooting at any place and any time, quickly and with accuracy". However, Iranian Minister for Defence Mostafa Mohammad-Najjar insisted that the missiles are "only intended for those who dare attack Iran". After the test, prices of oil and gold, already at or near all time highs, increased worldwide. Oil hit a new record (over $147 per barrel) on Friday, 11 July 2008, continuing a weekly string of records.

== Disputes ==
=== Photograph ===
Several sources have alleged that one of the photos of the actual launch was doctored by the Sepah News website, which is affiliated with the Iranian Revolutionary Guards. The photo was originally published by Agence France-Presse's news wire attributing it to Sepah News, and was later determined to be digitally altered. The altered photo showed a fourth Zelzal missile being launched that was digitally cloned over the top of a failed missile. Michele McNally of The New York Times said the alterations were done "rather sloppily in some places" and James Brown, a journalism professor from Indiana University, described the alterations as "amateurish". Agence France-Presse issued a correction to its wire release on 10 July warning that the photo was "apparently digitally altered."

=== Types of missile ===
On 12 July 2008, The New York Times claimed that numerous deceptions in the weapon test had occurred, including doctored photos and videos that showed multiple different angles of the same launches to make the launches appear more numerous. Experts who analysed the Shahab-3 launch alleged that the shorter ranged Shahab-3A was used instead of the Shahab-3B, as claimed by the Iranians. The Associated Press also claimed that no new capabilities had been demonstrated and that the Shahab-3 tested was not different in size from those tested in 1998. US officials also claimed that the video released looked "remarkably similar to previous tests."

The Chicago Tribune reported that Charles Vick, an analyst with GlobalSecurity.org, has claimed that the second Shahab-3 fired was actually a short range Scud-C missile. He also claimed the tests as, "basically a demonstration of all the weapon systems they bought from Russia, China or North Korea over the last decade."

== International reaction ==
- China – A spokesman for China's foreign ministry expressed "concern about these developments", and a "hope that measures taken by all sides will be to the benefit of regional peace and stability".
- France – A spokesman for the French foreign ministry stated that "these missile tests can only reinforce the concerns of the international community at a time when Iran is separately developing a nuclear programme".
- Germany – A spokesman for the German government described the tests as "a bad-will gesture", and "regrettable".
- Israel – A spokesman for the Israeli Prime Minister stated that "Israel has no desire for conflict or hostilities with Iran, but the Iranian nuclear programme and the Iranian ballistic missile programme must be of grave concern to the entire international community". Israel's housing minister stated in parliament that "Israel should prepare itself to do what is needed to do".
- Japan – The Japanese Cabinet Secretary called for "self-restraint on this kind of action, which only puts regional peace and stability at a disadvantage". He also referred to the G8 summit which was being held in Japan at the time, asking "what kind of international sense they have in launching purposely on the last day of the summit".
- Russia – Russian deputy foreign minister Sergei Kisliak called for diplomatic talks to be held in light of the tests, saying that "the signal that we have received in essence is that Iran is ready for negotiations".
- United Kingdom – The British government stated that the test was "unwelcome", and that it "underlines the need for Iran to comply with its international obligations on the nuclear issue".
- United States – White House spokesman Gordon Johndroe stated that "The Iranian regime only furthers the isolation of the Iranian people from the international community when it engages in this sort of activity", and US Secretary of State Condoleezza Rice claimed that the test showed "evidence that the missile threat is not an imaginary one". She also stated that it justified American plans to install missile defence systems in Eastern Europe, as did Republican presidential candidate John McCain. Democratic candidate Barack Obama described the Iranian missile programme as a "great threat".

== See also ==
- Great Prophet IX
