= Svalbard Rocket Range =

Rocket launch site in Svalbard, Norway

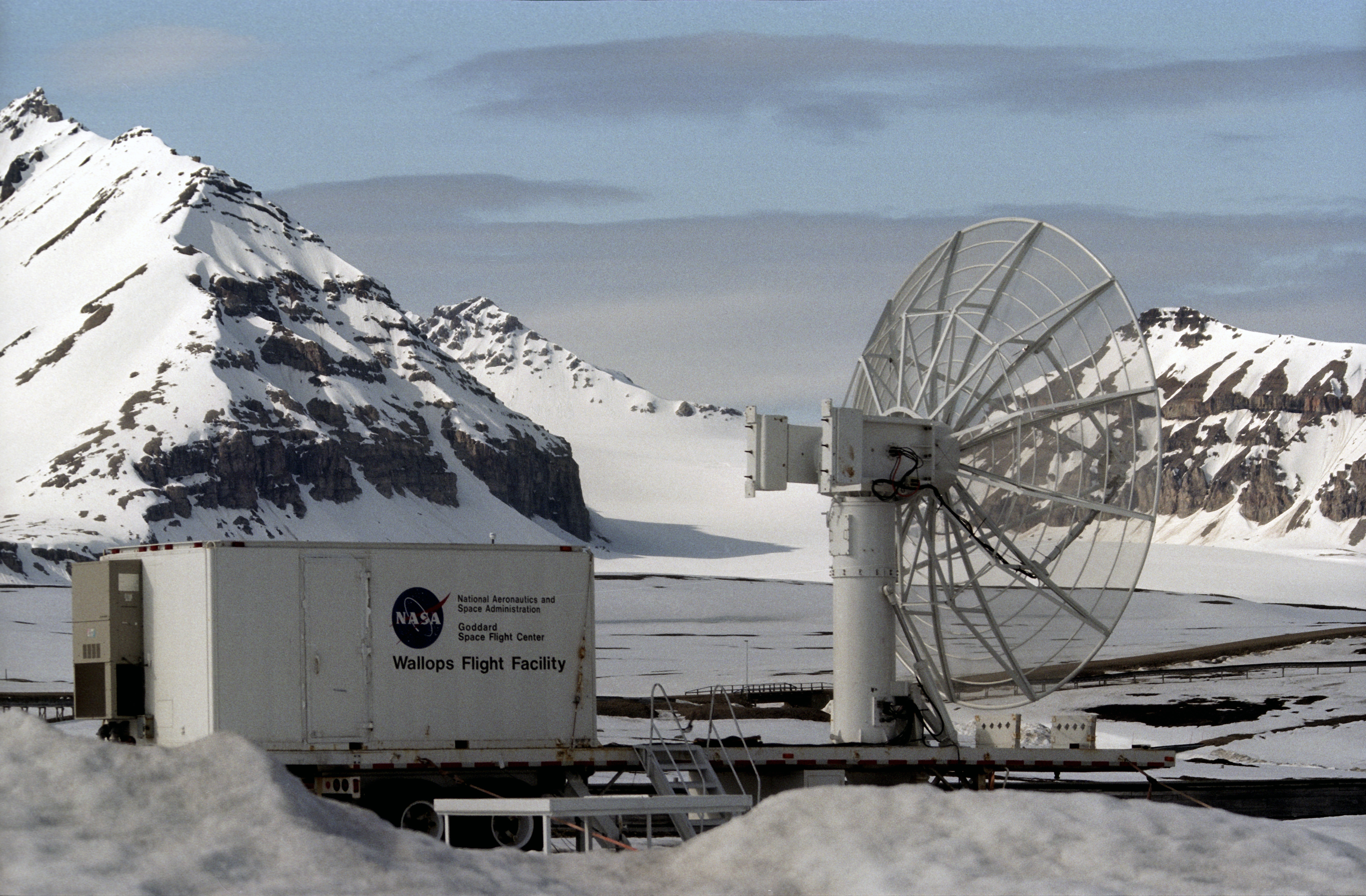
- The Svalbard Rocket Range is used by agencies such as NASA to launch sounding rockets

Agency overview
- Abbreviation: SvalRak
- Formed: 1993
- Type: Space agency
- Headquarters: 78°55′53″N 11°51′01″E
- Owner: Andøya Space Center
- Website: https://nyalesundresearch.no/members/andoya-space-center-asc-norway/

Map
- Location within Svalbard

The Svalbard Rocket Range or SvalRak as it is named, is a launch site for sounding rockets at Ny-Ålesund in Svalbard, Norway. The site has been in use since 1997 and is owned by Andøya Space Center, which is owned by the Norwegian Ministry of Trade, Industry and Fisheries and the Kongsberg Group. SvalRak's location at the 79th parallel north makes it well-suited for launching rockets to investigate Earth's magnetic field. It is used mostly by American, Japanese and Norwegian researchers. It is the world's northernmost launch site.

== History ==
Planning of a launch site in Ny-Ålesund started in 1993, a location chosen because of its ideal location to study the polar cusp. Construction of the site started in the summer of 1997. The Norwegian Institute for Air Research, which conducts air measurements in Ny-Ålesund, was concerned that the rockets could pollute their measurements. A test rocket was launched on 15 November. The first proper launch was an Indian Rohini RH-300 MkII sounding rocket purchased from ISRO and christened Isbjørn 1 (Polar Bear 1). This rocket contained instruments from University Centre in Svalbard, the University of Tromsø and the Norwegian Defence Research Establishment. The 510-kilogram (1,120 lb) rocket had a payload of 70 kilograms (150 lb) and reached 120 kilometers (75 mi) altitude. It was followed by two Black Brant rockets for the National Aeronautics and Space Administration which reached an altitude of 500 kilometers (310 mi).

== Use ==
SvalRak is the world's northernmost rocket launch site, and is located at the 79th parallel north. This makes it an ideal location for sending instruments into Earth's magnetic field and the polar cups, cleft and cup. It is also used for studying the Magnetopause and aurora borealis, for which Ny-Ålesund is the most convenient location because of its ease of access. It is owned by Andøya Space Center, which is owned by the Norwegian Ministry of Trade, Industry and Fisheries (90 percent) and the Kongsberg Group (10 percent). SvalRak has no permanent staff in Ny-Ålesund. The main users are American, Japanese and to a less extent Norwegian scientists.

== Launches ==
SvalRak originally held permission to fire four rockets every two years. Forty-one rockets had been launched by 2004, with a peak altitude of 1,108 kilometers (688 mi). The site was upgraded in 2018.

Date	Vehicle	Description	Agency	Apogee (km)
1997 November 20	RH-300 Mk II	ISBJORN-1 Ionosphere mission	NDRE	71
1997 November 20	Viper 3A	ISBJORN-2 (MD-5) Aeronomy mission	NDRE	97
1997 December 2	Black Brant IX	Plasma mission	NASA	433
1997 December 3	Black Brant IX	Plasma mission	NASA	446
2000 December 4	SS-520	Ionosphere mission	ISAS	1108
2001 July 16	Viper 3A	ROMA Aeronomy mission	DLR	108
2001 July 19	Viper 3A	ROMA Aeronomy mission	DLR	105
2001 July 22	Viper 3A	ROMA Aeronomy mission	DLR	100
2001 July 22	Viper 3A	ROMA Aeronomy mission	DLR	100
2001 July 25	Viper 3A	ROMA Aeronomy mission	DLR	100
2001 July 28	Viper 3A	ROMA Aeronomy mission	DLR	100
2001 July 31	Viper 3A	ROMA Aeronomy mission	DLR	100
2001 July 31	Viper 3A	ROMA Aeronomy mission	DLR	100
2001 August 2	Viper 3A	ROMA Aeronomy mission	DLR	100
2001 August 6	Viper 3A	ROMA Aeronomy mission	DLR	100
2001 August 9	Viper 3A	ROMA Aeronomy mission	DLR	100
2001 August 12	Viper 3A	ROMA Aeronomy mission	DLR	100
2001 August 17	Viper 3A	ROMA Aeronomy mission	DLR	100
2001 August 17	Viper 3A	ROMA Aeronomy mission	DLR	100
2001 August 20	Viper 3A	ROMA Aeronomy mission	DLR	100
2001 August 20	Viper 3A	ROMA Aeronomy mission	DLR	100
2001 August 23	Viper 3A	ROMA Aeronomy mission	DLR	100
2001 August 27	Viper 3A	ROMA Aeronomy mission	DLR	100
2001 August 28	Viper 3A	ROMA Aeronomy mission	DLR	100
2001 August 28	Viper 3A	ROMA Aeronomy mission	DLR	100
2001 August 29	Viper 3A	ROMA Aeronomy mission	DLR	100
2001 September 1	Viper 3A	ROMA Aeronomy mission	DLR	100
2001 September 5	Viper 3A	ROMA Aeronomy mission	DLR	100
2001 September 6	Viper 3A	ROMA Aeronomy mission	DLR	100
2001 September 8	Viper 3A	ROMA Aeronomy mission	DLR	100
2001 September 11	Viper 3A	ROMA Aeronomy mission	DLR	100
2001 September 11	Viper 3A	ROMA Aeronomy mission	DLR	100
2001 September 14	Viper 3A	ROMA Aeronomy mission	DLR	100
2001 September 14	Viper 3A	ROMA Aeronomy mission	DLR	100
2001 September 14	Viper 3A	ROMA Aeronomy mission	DLR	100
2002 December 14	Black Brant 10CM1	Plasma mission	NASA	772
2003 July 1	Improved Orion	ROMA 2003 Aeronomy mission	DLR	85
2003 July 4	Improved Orion	ROMA 2003 Aeronomy mission	DLR	85
2003 July 6	Improved Orion	ROMA 2003 Aeronomy mission	DLR	85
2003 November 28	Nike Improved Orion	FAILURE: Failure	NDRE	12
2004 January 22	Black Brant 10CM1	SERSIO Plasma mission	NASA	790
2008 December 5	VS-30/Orion	ARR ICI-2	Sweden	
2011 December 3	VS-30/Orion	ICI-3	Sweden	354
