= Rodnik =

Brand of Russian vodka

- Product type: Vodka
- Country: Russia
- Introduced: 1895

Rodnik is a brand of Russian vodka. The brand's distillery is in Samara, Russia.

== History ==
The distillery was founded in 1895.
