= COSMOS International =

Russian-German launch service provider and satellite manufacturer

COSMOS International or COSMOS International Satellitenstart GmbH is a joint Russian-German launch service provider and satellite manufacturer. A partnership between OHB System, Fuchs Gruppe and PO Polyot, COSMOS commercially markets launches using the Kosmos-3M rocket, which are subcontracted to the Russian Space Forces.

The organisation conducted its first launch on 28 April 1999, placing ABRIXAS and MegSat into orbit, on a single rocket. It has been responsible for the launches of SAR-Lupe satellites for Germany's Bundeswehr (defence force).

== See also ==
- Eurockot
- Starsem
- International Launch Services
- Sea Launch
