= Charles P. Vick =

American space analyst

- Born: Charles P. Vick; 1946 (age 78–79); United States
- Occupation(s): Space historian, policy analyst

Charles P. Vick is an American space historian and policy analyst, with a focus on Soviet, Russian, and Chinese space and ballistic missile systems.

Vick is a senior technical and policy analysis at GlobalSecurity.org.

== Career ==
He earned an Associate of Applied Science degree in mechanical engineering technology from Old Dominion University in 1970. From 1971 to 1975 he worked as a consultant on the Soviet space program for the Congressional Research Service, followed by employments at Bechtel, the U.S. Space & Rocket Center, and the Federation of American Scientists. In 2003, he joined GlobalSecurity.org.

One of Vick's specialities are drawing reconstructions of secret space projects. In the early 1980s he was the first to publicly present his attempted drawings of the then still secret Soviet N1 and Proton rockets. He was also among the first to publish about Soviet Nuclear power satellites, and the potential usage of space-based radars to track submarines by their effect on surface waves.

In 1993 Vick and Apollo historian W. David Woods started an effort to publish the diaries of Vasily Mishin, who was the General Chief designer for the Soviet crewed lunar program from the mid-1960s to 1974.
