= INS Kalinga =

Coordinates: 17°51′28.53″N 83°24′55.72″E

- Part of Eastern Naval Command
- Visakhapatnam, Andhra Pradesh
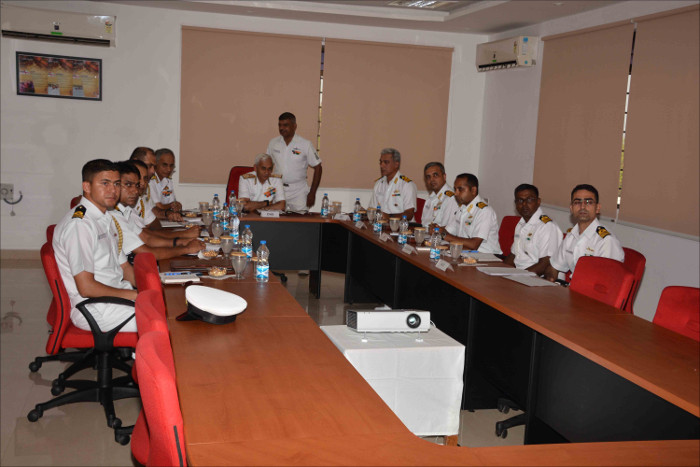
- Admiral Sunil Lanba attending a briefing at INS Kalinga on 10 March 2018.

Site information
- Type: Naval station
- Controlled by: Indian Navy
- Condition: Active

Site history
- Built: 21 November 1985
- In use: 1985-present

Garrison information
- Occupants: Eastern Naval Command

INS Kalinga is an Indian Navy establishment reporting to the Eastern Naval Command. It is responsible for preparing, storing and delivering advanced missiles to ships of the Eastern Fleet. INS Kalinga was commissioned on 21 November 1985. Over the past 36 years, the establishment has grown into a fully-fledged Station with co-located units such as MARCOS (E), NAD (V), NAI (V) and MES. The station is spread over an area of 734.1 acres and consists of over 900 service and civilian personnel with their families. INS Kalinga is located on the Visakhapatnam - Bheemunipatnam beach road about 40 kilometers northeast of the Visakhapatnam Naval Base.

The establishment has married accommodations for officers, sailors, DSC personnel and civilians. It has medical facilities at a sickbay, LCA auditorium and community hall for movie and general activities, a Library-with-reading room, and KV and NKG schools for education facilities. In the field of sport, it has a badminton court, tennis court, basketball court, football ground, volleyball court and swimming pool. Kalinga station has night landing facilities at an existing helipad.

== See also ==
Indian navy

- List of Indian Navy bases
- List of active Indian Navy ships

Integrated commands and units

- Armed Forces Special Operations Division
- Defence Cyber Agency
- Integrated Defence Staff
- Integrated Space Cell
- Indian Nuclear Command Authority
- Indian Armed Forces
- Special Forces of India

Other lists

- Strategic Forces Command
- List of Indian Air Force stations
- List of Indian Navy bases
- India's overseas military bases
