= Near Field Infrared Experiment =

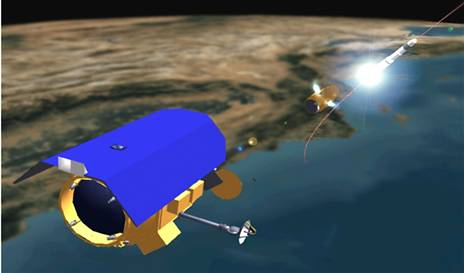
- NFIRE satellite
- Names: NFIRE
- COSPAR ID: 2007-014A
- SATCAT no.: 31140

Start of mission
- Launch date: 06:48, April 24, 2007 (UTC)
- Rocket: Minotaur rocket
- Launch site: MARS LP-0B

End of mission
- Decay date: November 4, 2015

Orbital parameters
- Reference system: Geocentric
- Eccentricity: 0.01551
- Perigee altitude: 255 km (158 mi)
- Apogee altitude: 464 km (288 mi)
- Inclination: 48.2°
- Period: 91.7 min

The Near Field Infrared Experiment (NFIRE) was a satellite that was proposed and developed by the Missile Defense Agency, a division of the United States Department of Defense. It was launched atop a Minotaur rocket, from Wallops Island, at 06:48 GMT on 24 April 2007. Though primarily designed to gather data on exhaust plumes from rockets, the satellite was also intended to contain a kill vehicle similar to kinds intended for the Strategic Defense Initiative. A missile was then to be fired at and nearly miss the instrumented kill vehicle. This feature was later removed.

NFIRE was funded by $44 million in FY2004. In 2004, the United States House of Representatives instructed the Missile Defense Agency, MDA, to remove the kill vehicle from the planned 2006 NFIRE launch, approving $68 million in FY2005 subject to that condition. The Senate Appropriations Committee reviewing the NFIRE program, however, urged the MDA to return the missile defense interceptor (kill vehicle) to the originally scheduled test, despite the controversial perception of this leading to the deployment of weapons in space. The committee, which approved $13.7 million for the NFIRE program in FY06, told the MDA to "complete development and mission integration of the deployable NFIRE Kill Vehicle."

The MDA removed the kill vehicle portion of the planned test, saying it posed a risk of technical failure, and replaced it with a laser communications payload from Tesat-Spacecom.

NFIRE reentered the Earth's atmosphere on November 4, 2015.
