= Orion (rocket) =

American sounding rocket

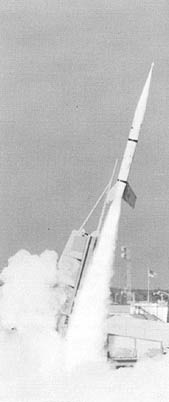
- One of the first Orion rockets (HAWK at the time) shortly after launch.
- Function: sounding rocket
- Manufacturer: NASA
- Country of origin: United States

Size
- Height: 5.60 m
- Diameter: 0.35 m
- Mass: 400 kg
- Stages: 1

Launch history
- Launch sites: Wallops, White Sands, Poker Flat, Andoya, Esrange, Barreira do Inferno

First stage
- Thrust: 7 kN

Orion is the designation of a small American sounding rocket. The Orion has a length of 5.60 meters, a diameter of 0.35 m, a launch weight of 400 kg, a launch thrust of 7 kN and a ceiling of 85 kilometers. The Orion, built by NASA Goddard Space Flight Center's Wallops Flight Facility, is also used as an upper stage of sounding rockets, usually paired with a Terrier missile as the first stage, although Nike, Taurus and VS-30 rockets are also used.

Two Orion versions exist:

- Orion, using a Aerojet M22E8 dual-thrust motor (from the MIM-23A Hawk missile).
- Improved Orion using a Aerojet M112 dual-thrust motor (from the MIM-23B I-Hawk missile).

The sounding rocket is launched from Wallops Flight Facility, White Sands, Poker Flat Rocket Range, Andoya Rocket Range, Esrange and Barreira do Inferno.

== Incidents ==
A lightning storm over the Wallops launch pad on 9 June 1987 ignited a NASA Orion rocket and 2 other sounding rockets. The Orion flew horizontally about 300 feet into the ocean. The sounding rockets rose to around 15,000 feet altitude, then fell about 2 miles from the launch pad. No persons were hurt in the incident.

== Gallery ==
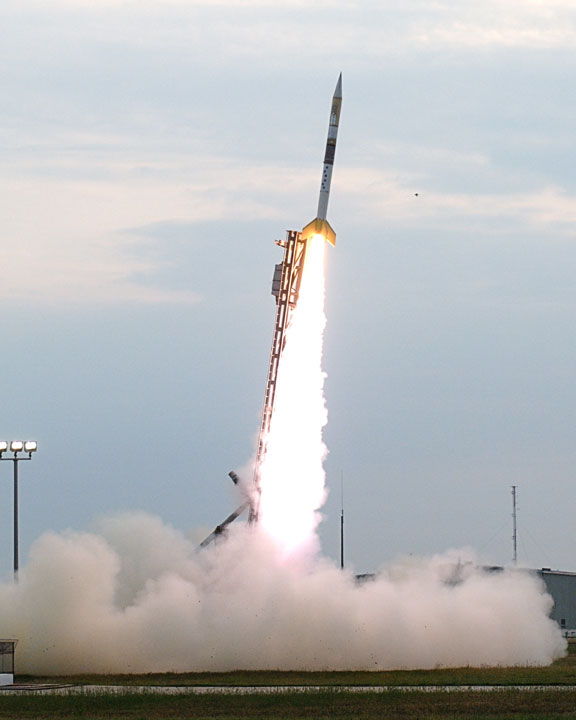
Orion carrying experiments developed by students (June 8, 2006)

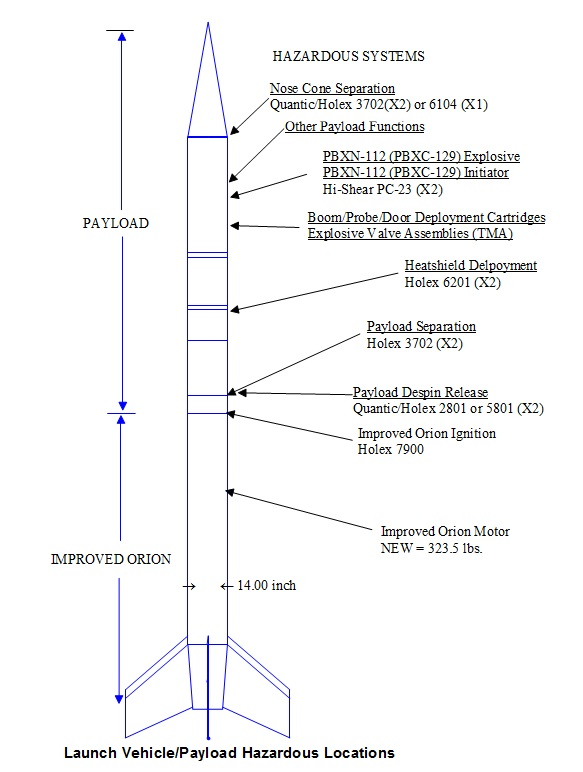
Improved Orion scheme

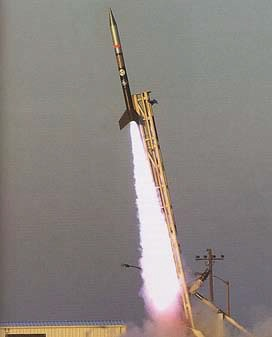
Improved Orion just after launch.

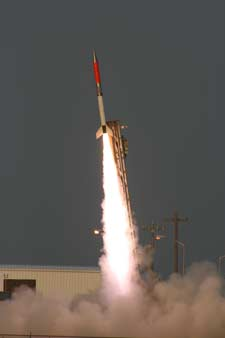
Improved Orion launch
