= 2009 in spaceflight =

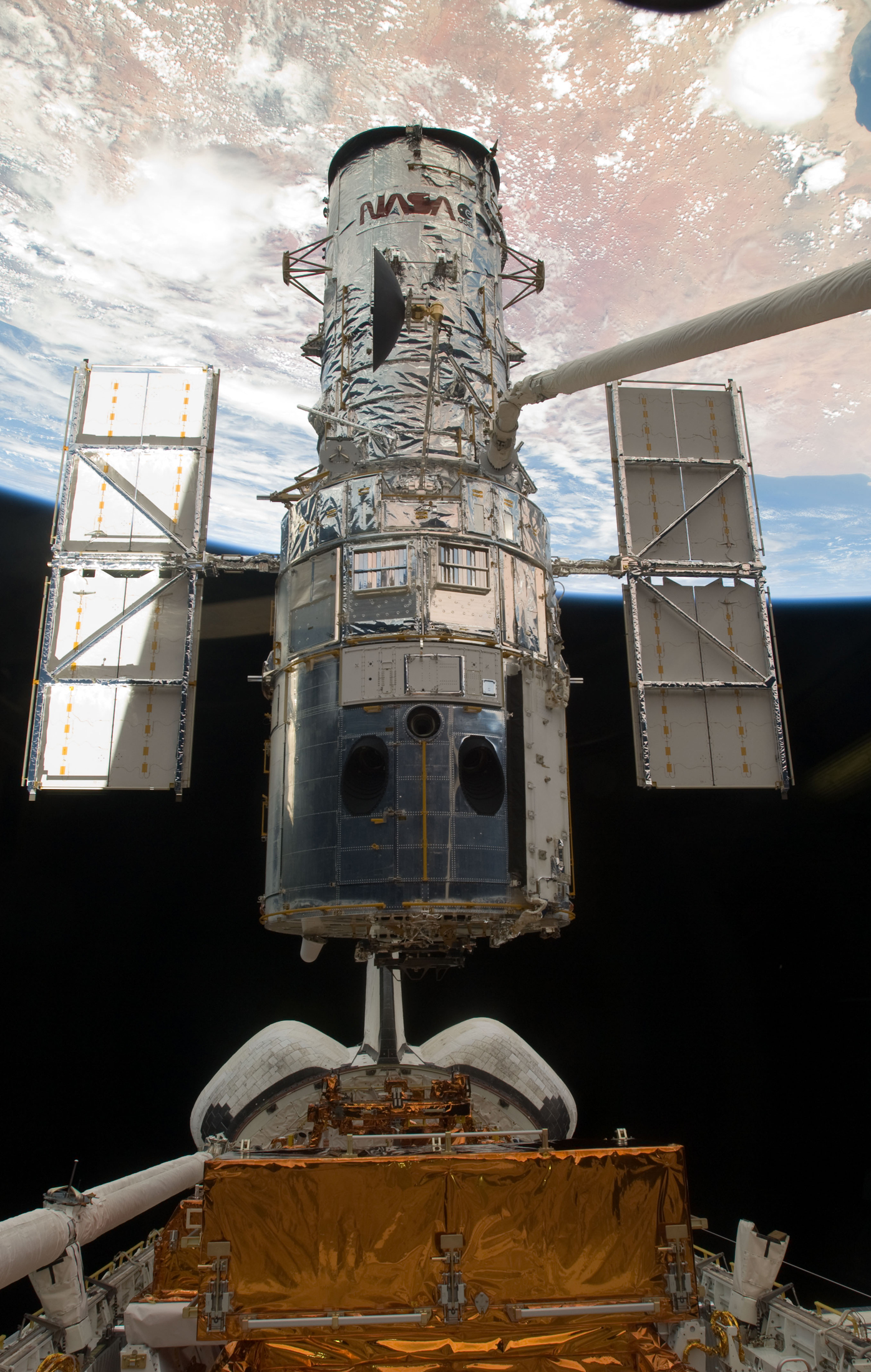
- The Hubble Space Telescope was serviced for the last time during the STS-125 mission

Orbital launches
- First: 18 January
- Last: 29 December
- Total: 78
- Successes: 73
- Failures: 4
- Partial failures: 1
- Catalogued: 75

National firsts
- Spaceflight: New Zealand
- Satellite: Switzerland
- Orbital launch: Iran

Rockets
- Maiden flights: Delta IV-M+ (5,4); H-IIB; Naro-1; Taurus-XL 3110; Unha-2
- Retirements: Ariane 5GS; Falcon 1 Tsyklon-3

Crewed flights
- Orbital: 9
- Total travellers: 46

2009 in spaceflight

Several significant events in spaceflight occurred in 2009, including Iran conducting its first indigenous orbital launch, the first Swiss satellite being launched and New Zealand launching its first sounding rocket. The H-IIB and Naro-1 rockets conducted maiden flights, whilst the Tsyklon-3, Falcon 1 and Ariane 5GS were retired from service. The permanent crew of the International Space Station increased from three to six in May, and in the last few months of the year, Japan's first resupply mission to the outpost, HTV-1, was conducted successfully.

== Overview ==
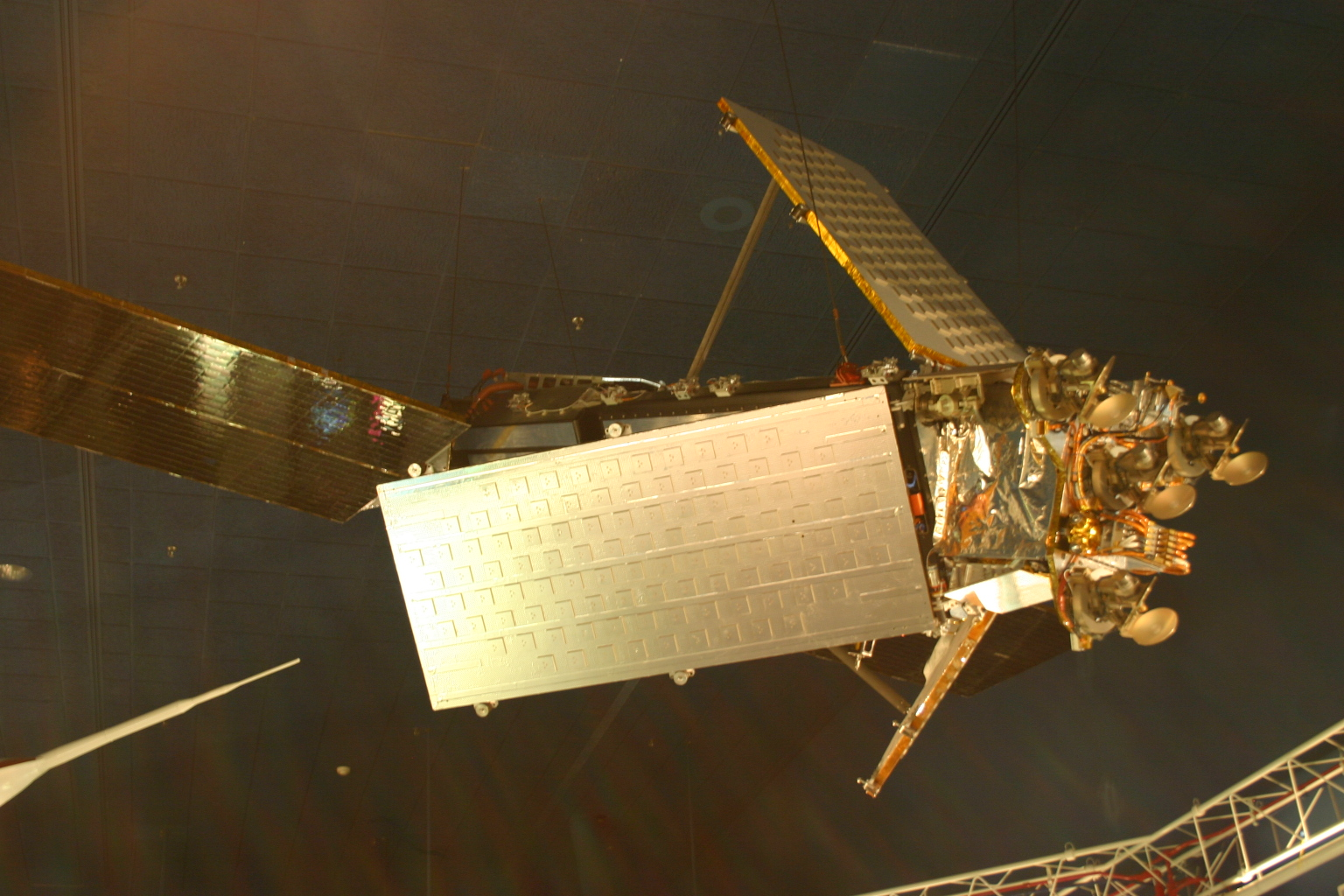
An Iridium satellite

The internationally accepted definition of a spaceflight is any flight which crosses the Kármán line, 100 kilometres above sea level. The first spaceflight launch of the year was that of a Delta IV Heavy, carrying the USA-202 ELINT satellite, which launched from Cape Canaveral Air Force Station at 02:47 GMT on 18 January. This was also the first orbital launch of the year.

On 2 February, Iran conducted its first successful orbital launch, when a Safir was used to place the Omid satellite into low Earth orbit.

At 16:56 GMT on 10 February, the first major collision between two satellites in orbit occurred, resulting in the destruction of Kosmos 2251 and Iridium 33, launched in 1993 and 1997 respectively. Up until the collision, Iridium 33 was operational, and an active part of the Iridium network of satellites, whilst Kosmos 2251 was an inactive piece of space junk.

On 25 August, the Russo- South Korean Naro-1 rocket made its maiden flight on 25 August, marking South Korea's first involvement in conducting a satellite launch attempt, however the rocket failed to reach orbit after its payload fairing malfunctioned.

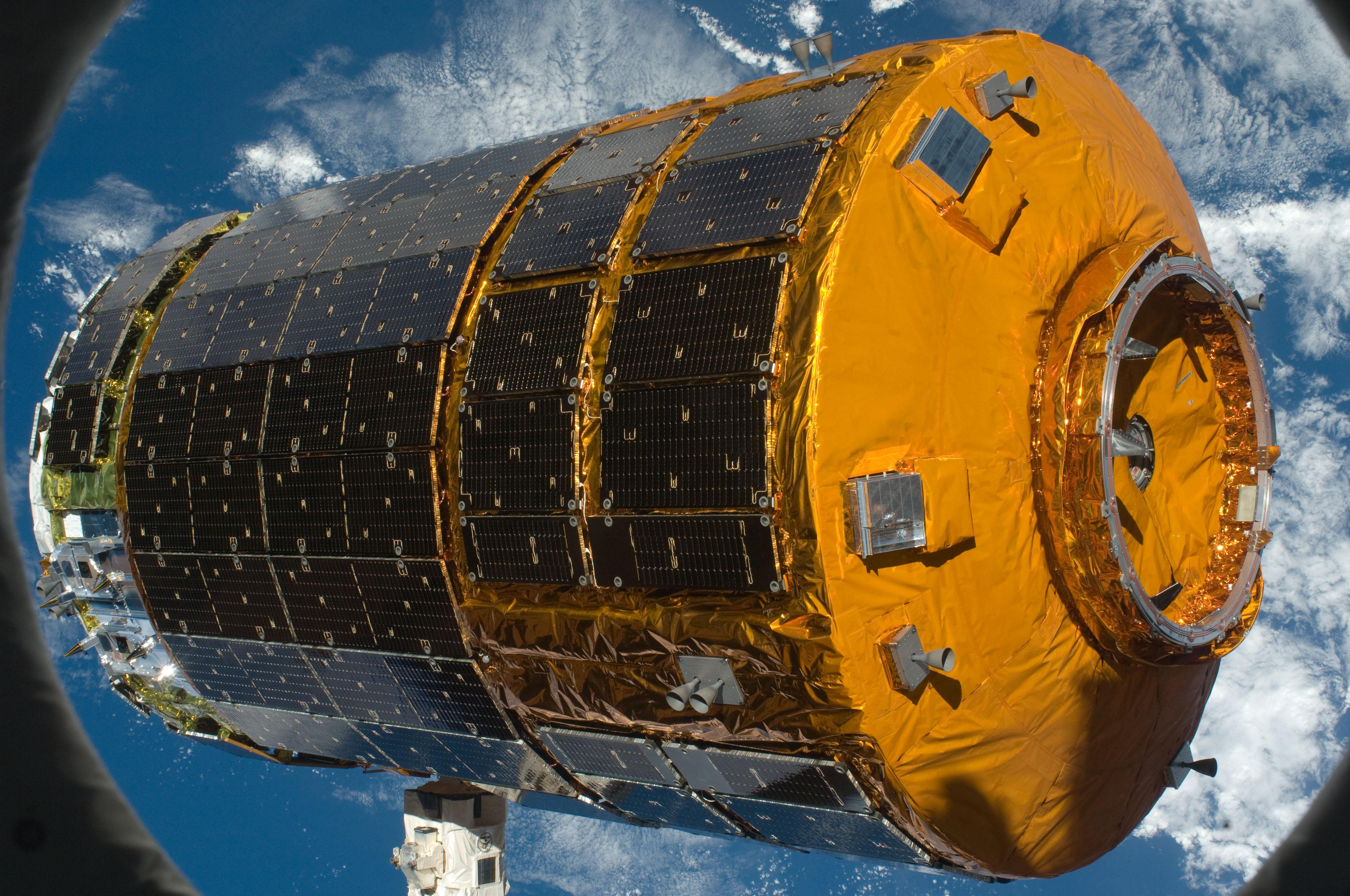
HTV-1 arriving at the ISS

The first flight of the SpaceX Falcon 9 carrier rocket was scheduled to occur in November, but was delayed to February 2010 to allow more time for preparations. The SpaceX Dragon, a commercial uncrewed logistics spacecraft which was developed as part of NASA's COTS programme, was also scheduled to make its first flight in 2009, however its launch has also slipped to 2010 as a result of knock-on delays. The first H-II Transfer Vehicle, HTV-1, was successfully launched on the maiden flight of the H-IIB carrier rocket on 10 September. The first Swiss satellite, SwissCube-1, was launched on 23 September aboard a PSLV.

On 18 December, the Ariane 5GS made its final flight, delivering the Helios-IIB satellite into a Sun-synchronous orbit. The last orbital launch of the year was conducted eleven days later, on 29 December, when a Proton-M with a Briz-M upper stage launched the DirecTV-12 satellite.

== Space exploration ==
Although no planetary probes were launched in 2009, four astronomical observatories were placed into orbit. The Kepler spacecraft, which was launched by a Delta II on 7 March, entered an Earth-trailing heliocentric orbit from where it will search for exoplanets. On 14 May, and Ariane 5ECA launched the Herschel and Planck spacecraft. Both were placed at the L_{2} Lagrangian point between the Earth and Sun, from where they will be used for astronomy. Herschel carries an infrared telescope whilst Planck carries an optical one. The fourth observatory to be launched was the Wide-field Infrared Survey Explorer, or WISE, which is a replacement for the Wide Field Infrared Explorer which failed shortly after launch. WISE was launched into a Sun-synchronous orbit by a Delta II on 14 December, and will be used for infrared astronomy. Repairs made to the Hubble Space Telescope during STS-125 restored it to full operations after a series of malfunctions in 2008.

Two lunar probes were launched in 2009; the Lunar Reconnaissance Orbiter and Lunar Crater Observation and Sensing Satellite were launched on a single Atlas V rocket on 18 June. LRO entered selenocentric orbit and began a series of experiments, whilst LCROSS remained attached to the Centaur upper stage of the carrier rocket, and flew past the Moon. After orbiting the Earth twice, LCROSS separated from the upper stage and both it and the Centaur impacted the Cabeus crater at the South Pole of the Moon, on 9 October. By observing the Centaur's impact, LCROSS was able to confirm the presence of water on the Moon. Several other Lunar probes ceased operations in 2009; Okina impacted the far side of the Moon on 12 February, Chang'e 1 was deorbited on 1 March, having completed its operations. Kaguya was also deorbited following a successful mission, impacting near Gill crater on 12 June. The Chandrayaan-1 spacecraft failed on 29 August, having operated for less than half of its design life.

The Mars Science Laboratory and Fobos-Grunt missions to Mars had been scheduled for launch at the end of 2009, however both were delayed to 2011 to allow more time for the spacecraft to be developed. Fobos-Grunt, a sample return mission to Mars' natural satellite Phobos, would have carried the first Chinese planetary probe, Yinghuo-1.

Several flybys occurred in 2009, with Cassini continuing to orbit Saturn, passing close to a number of its natural satellites. In February, Dawn passed within 549 kilometres (341 mi) of Mars, during a gravity assist manoeuvre for its journey to the asteroid belt. In September, MESSENGER made its third and final flyby of Mercury before entering orbit in 2011. Whilst the primary objective of the flyby, achieving a gravitational assist, was successful, the spacecraft entered safe mode shortly before its closest approach, which prevented it recording data as it flew away from the planet. In November, the Rosetta spacecraft performed its third and final gravity assist flyby of Earth.

== Crewed spaceflight ==
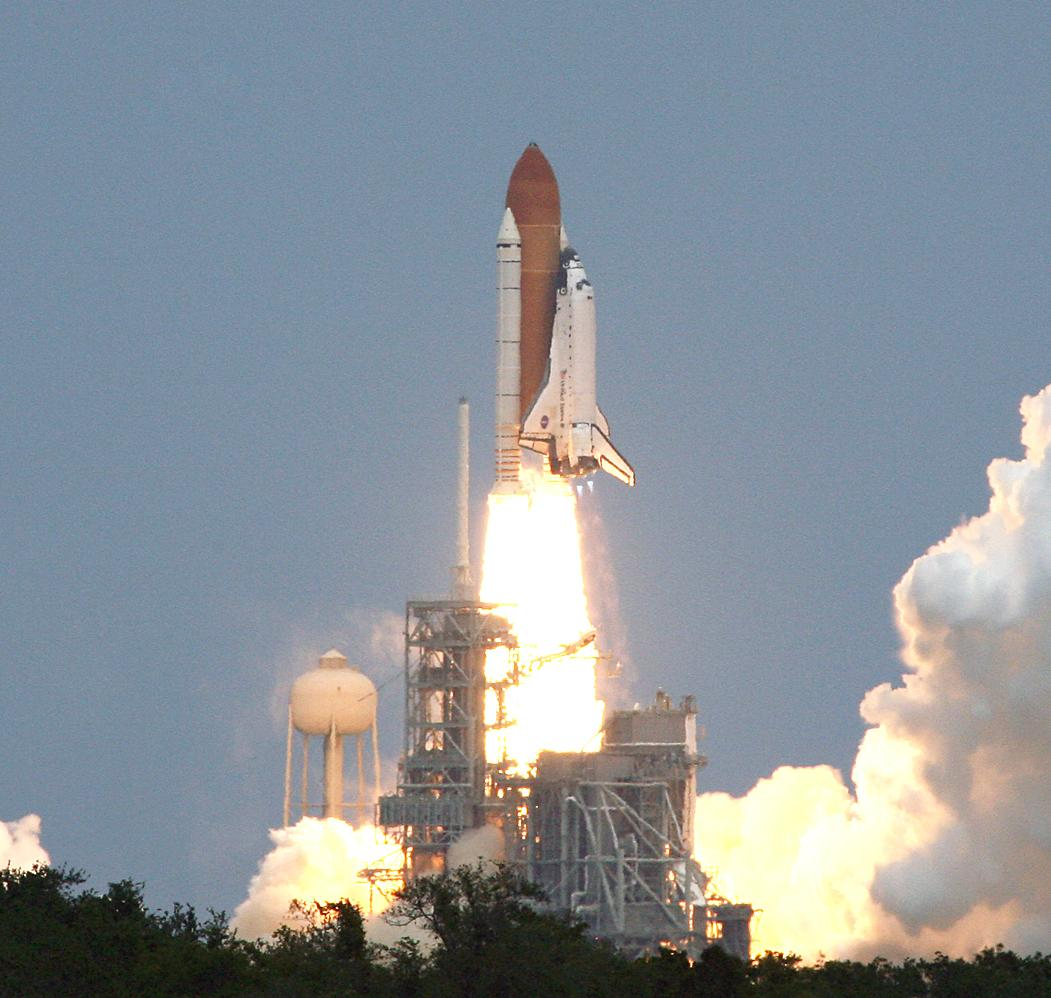
Launch of Space Shuttle Atlantis on STS-125, the last Hubble servicing flight

Nine crewed launches occurred in 2009, the most since 1997. STS-119, using Space Shuttle Discovery, was launched on 15 March. It installed the last set of solar arrays on the International Space Station. Soyuz TMA-14, the 100th crewed Soyuz launch, delivered the Expedition 19 crew in March. In May, Space Shuttle Atlantis conducted the final mission to service the Hubble Space Telescope, STS-125. Several days later, Soyuz TMA-15 launched with the ISS Expedition 20 crew, brought the total ISS crew size up to six for the first time. This was also the 100th crewed spaceflight of the Soyuz programme, excluding the original Soyuz T-10 mission which failed to reach space. In July, Space Shuttle Endeavour delivered the final component of the Japanese Experiment Module on mission STS-127. STS-128, using Discovery in August, delivered supplies using the Leonardo MPLM. September saw the launch of Soyuz TMA-16, with the ISS Expedition 21 crew. This was the 100th crewed Soyuz mission reach orbit. In November, Space Shuttle Atlantis flew mission STS-129, delivering two EXPRESS Logistics Carriers to the ISS. The final crewed flight of the year, Soyuz TMA-17, was launched on 20 December with the ISS Expedition 22 crew.

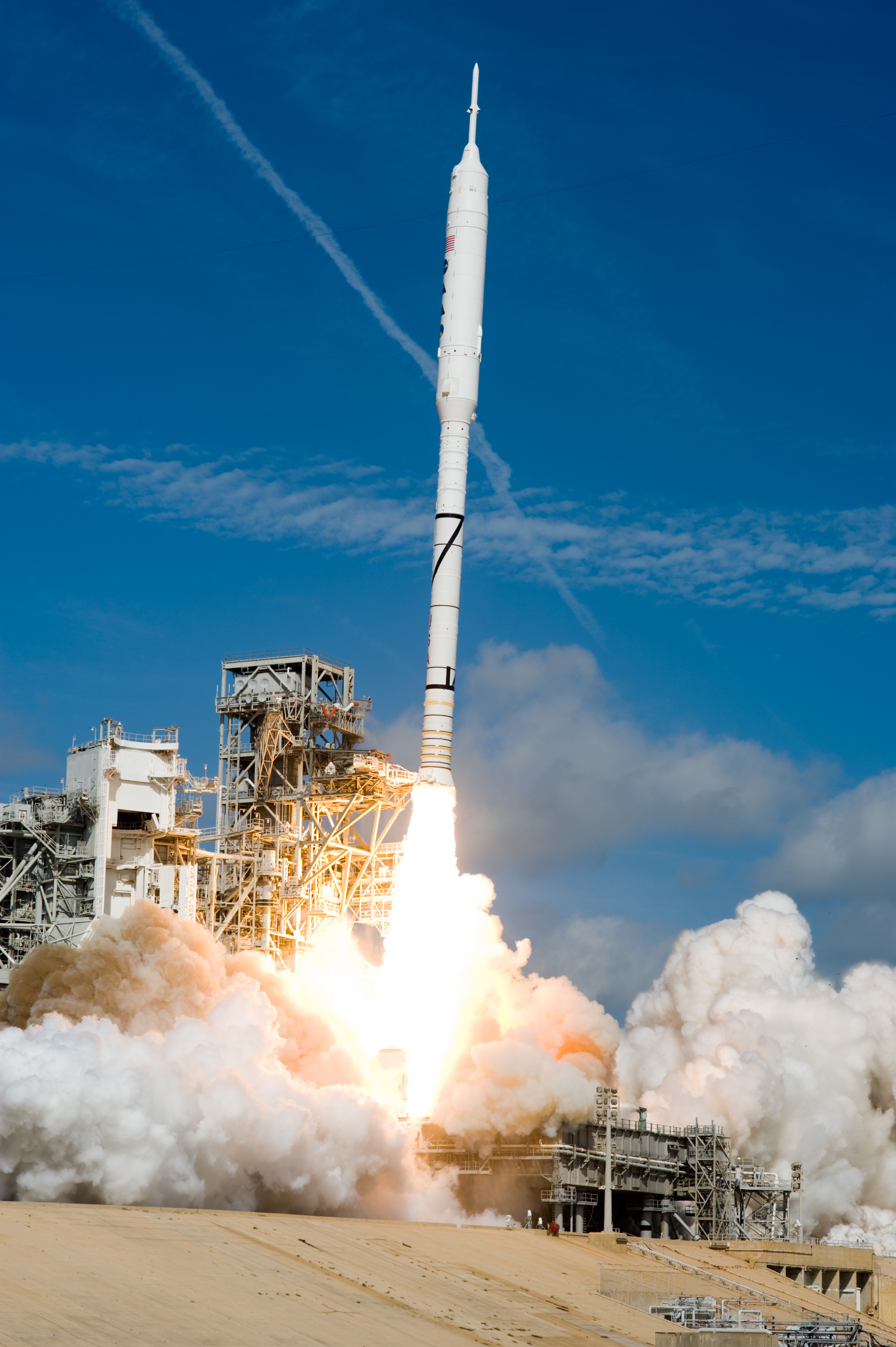
The launch of Ares I-X

Although not a spaceflight in its own right, the Ares I-X test flight was conducted on 28 October, with the rocket lifting off from Launch Complex 39B of the Kennedy Space Center at 15:30 GMT. The flight was successful and reached an altitude of around 46 kilometres (29 mi), within the upper atmosphere. A parachute failure during descent resulted in some damage to the first stage, which was recovered.

== Launch failures ==
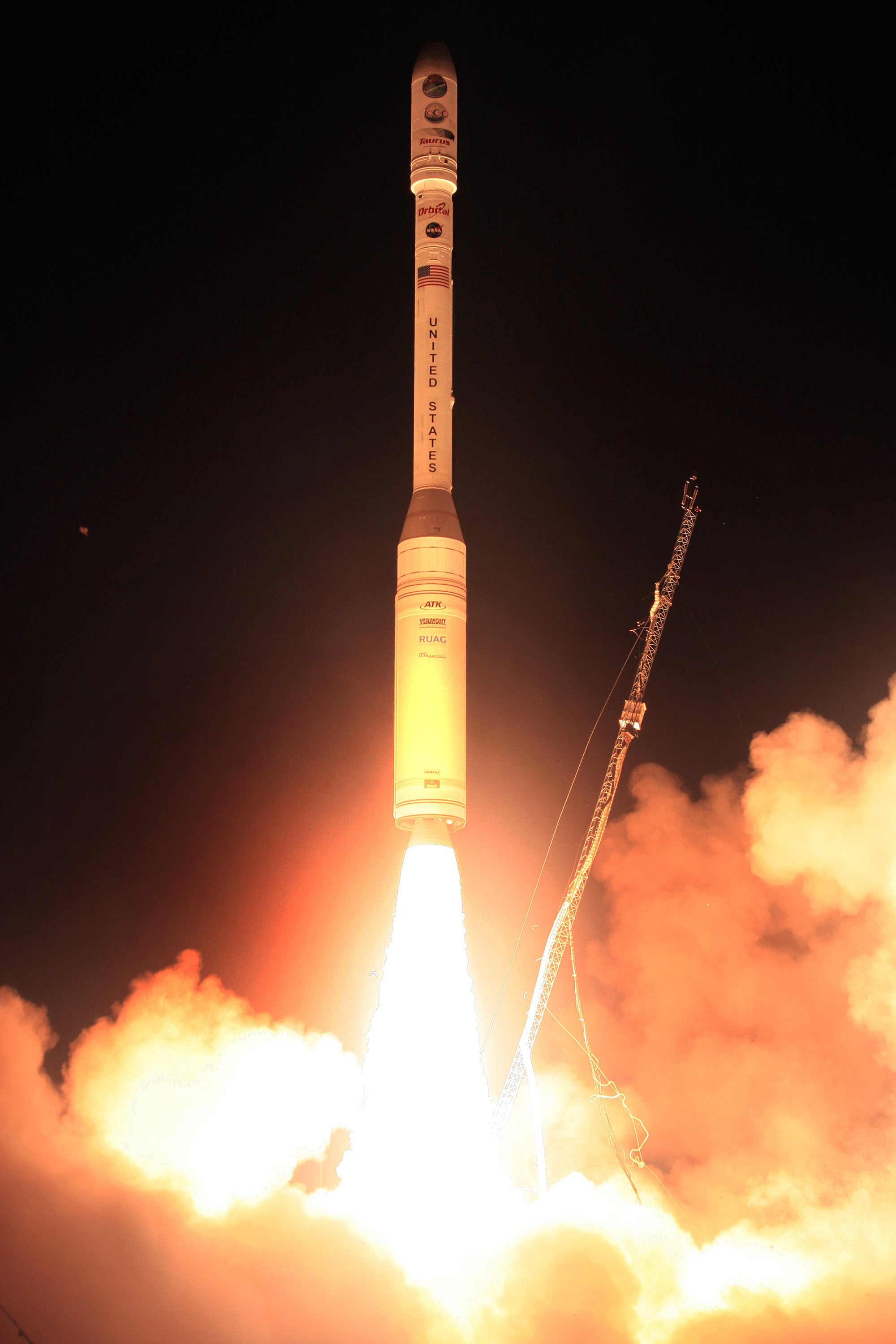
OCO launches on a Taurus

Four orbital launch failures occurred in 2009. On 24 February, a Taurus-XL launched from the Vandenberg Air Force Base in California, United States, with the Orbiting Carbon Observatory. The payload fairing did not separate from the rocket, leaving the upper stage with too much mass to reach orbit. The stage, with spacecraft and fairing still attached, reentered the atmosphere, coming down off the coast of Antarctica. The second failure was a controversial North Korean launch attempt using an Unha rocket to launch the Kwangmyŏngsŏng-2 communications satellite. The launch was conducted on 5 April, and North Korea maintains that it successfully reached orbit, however no objects from the launch were tracked as having orbital velocity, and US radar systems tracking the rocket detected that it failed at around the time of third stage ignition, with debris falling in the Pacific Ocean.

A Soyuz-2.1a suffered a failure during the launch of Meridian 2 on 21 May, due to the premature cutoff of the second core stage of the carrier rocket. The satellite was placed in a lower than planned orbit, which it was initially expected to be able to correct by means of its onboard propulsion system, and the launch was reported to be a partial failure. By the time of the next Meridian launch in 2010 it had been confirmed that the satellite could not correct its own orbit, and that the mission was a failure. On 25 August, the Naro-1 rocket was launched on its maiden flight, however one half of the payload fairing failed to separate, and it did not reach orbit.

On 31 August a Long March 3B placed the Palapa-D satellite into a lower than expected orbit after its third stage gas generator burned through, resulting in an engine failure at the start of the second burn. The satellite was able to raise itself to its correct orbit at the expense of fuel which would have been used for five or six years of operations.

== Summary of launches ==
In total, seventy eight orbital launches were attempted in 2009, with seventy five catalogued as having reached orbit, and the three outright launch failures, including the North Korean launch, not being catalogued. This is an increase of nine attempts compared to 2008, and eight more launches reached orbit. This continues a four-year trend of increasing annual launch rates. The United States National Space Science Data Center catalogued 123 spacecraft placed into orbit by launches which occurred in 2009.

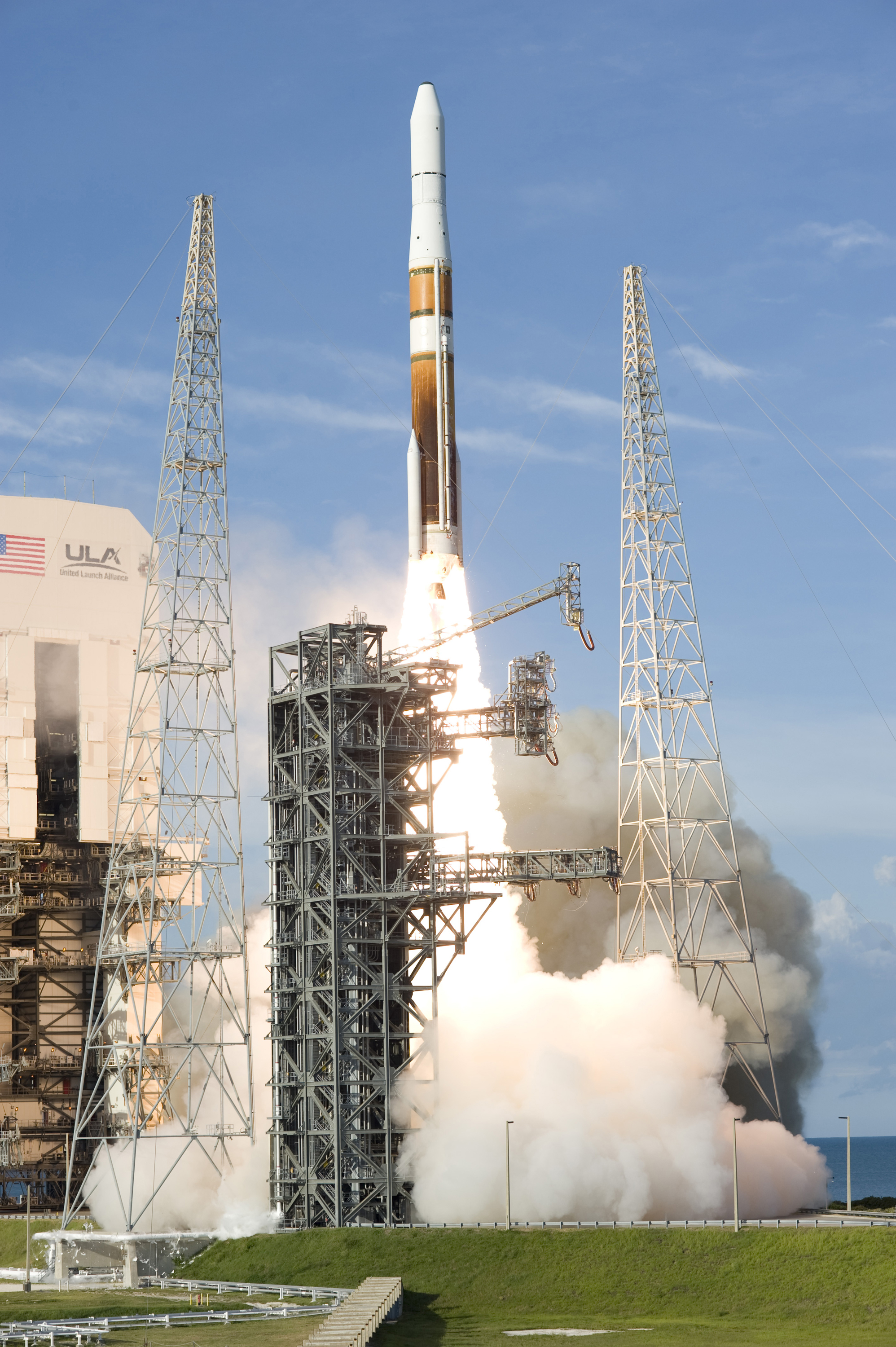
Launch of a Delta IV-M+(4,2) EELV with GOES 14

Suborbital spaceflight in 2009 saw a number of sounding rocket and missile launches. New Zealand's Ātea-1 sounding rocket was launched on 30 November, marking that country's first suborbital flight. Russia twice attempted launches of its Bulava missile, however both launches failed. The second failure, which occurred on 9 December, resulted in a spiral pattern which was observed in the sky over Norway. The SpaceLoft-XL rocket experienced another launch failure during its third flight, on 2 May. The payload section separated from the rocket whilst it was still burning, and as a result the vehicle did not reach space. It had been carrying samples of cremated human remains for Celestis, and student experiments.

=== By country ===
China conducted six launches in 2009; satellite problems early in the year followed by the fallout of the August partial launch failure resulted in many planned launches slipping into 2010. Europe launched seven Ariane 5 rockets, six in the ECA configuration and one in the GS configuration. It had also intended to launch the first Vega rocket, however this was delayed due to ongoing development issues, which had already left the project several years behind schedule. India conducted two launches of Polar Satellite Launch Vehicles, however the first flight of a new variant of the Geosynchronous Satellite Launch Vehicle with an Indian-built upper stage slipped into 2010. Japan conducted three launches; two using the H-IIA, plus the first H-IIB. Russia and the former Soviet Union conducted twenty nine launches, not including the international Sea and Land launch programmes, which conducted four, and the single Naro-1 launch conducted in cooperation with South Korea.

The United States made twenty four launch attempts, with the Evolved Expendable Launch Vehicles accounting for eight; the most EELV launches in a single year to date. Eight Delta II launches were also made, including its last mission with a GPS satellite, and its last flight with a payload for the United States armed forces. As the Delta II programme wound down, Space Launch Complex 17A at the Cape Canaveral Air Force Station, one of the oldest operational launch pads in the world, was deactivated. SpaceX launched a single Falcon 1, which successfully placed an operational satellite into orbit for the first time. This was the final flight of the Falcon 1, which was subsequently retired from service in favour of the Falcon 1e. At the start of the year, a mockup Falcon 9 was erected on its launch pad at Canaveral, however the type's maiden flight slipped into 2010.

Sea Launch only conducted a single launch in 2009; a Zenit-3SL launched Sicral 1B in April. In June, the company was declared bankrupt, and subsequently it lost a number of launch contracts. By the end of the year it was expecting to resume launches in 2010. Its subsidiary, Land Launch, conducted three launches. Iran made its first successful indigenous orbital launch, however planned follow-up launches had not been conducted by the end of the year. North Korea made one launch which it claimed had successfully placed a satellite into orbit, however no such satellite was detected by any country capable of doing so. Israel was not reported to have scheduled or conducted an orbital launch attempt.

== Orbital launches ==
- ← Jan
- Feb
- Mar
- Apr
- May
- Jun
- Jul
- Aug
- Sep
- Oct
- Nov
- Dec →

Date and time (UTC)	Rocket	Flight number	Launch site		LSP	
Date and time (UTC)	Payload (⚀ = CubeSat)	Operator	Orbit	Function	Decay (UTC)	Outcome
Date and time (UTC)	Remarks					
=== January ===
18 January; 02:47	(United States) Delta IV Heavy		(United States) Cape Canaveral SLC-37B		(United States) United Launch Alliance	
18 January; 02:47	(United States) USA-202 / Orion 6	NRO	Geosynchronous	ELINT	In orbit	Operational
18 January; 02:47	NROL-26 mission.					
23 January; 03:54	(Japan) H-IIA 202		(Japan) Tanegashima LA-Y1		(Japan) Mitsubishi	
23 January; 03:54	(Japan) Ibuki (GOSAT)	JAXA	Low Earth (SSO)	Climatology	In orbit	Operational
23 January; 03:54	(Japan) SDS-1	JAXA	Low Earth (SSO)	Technology demonstration	In orbit	Successful
23 January; 03:54	(Japan) Sohla-1 (Maido-1)	SOHLA	Low Earth (SSO)	Technology demonstration	In orbit	Successful
23 January; 03:54	(Japan) Raijin (Sprite-Sat)	Tohoku University	Low Earth (SSO)	Sprite research	In orbit	Spacecraft failure
23 January; 03:54	(Japan) Kagayaki	Sorun	Low Earth (SSO)	Technology demonstration	In orbit	Spacecraft failure
23 January; 03:54	(Japan) Hitomi (PRISM)	University of Tokyo	Low Earth (SSO)	Technology demonstration	In orbit	Operational
23 January; 03:54	(Japan) Kukai (STARS)	Kagawa University	Low Earth (SSO)	Technology demonstration	In orbit	Spacecraft failure
23 January; 03:54	(Japan) Kiseki (KKS-1)	TMCIT	Low Earth (SSO)	Technology demonstration	In orbit	Spacecraft failure
23 January; 03:54	Raijin failed to respond to commands from ground following electromagnetic boom deployment, Kagayaki failed to contact ground, STARS tether deployment failed, Kiseki failed to respond to commands from ground.					
30 January; 13:30	(Ukraine) Tsyklon-3		(Russia) Plesetsk Site 32/2		(Russia) Roscosmos	
30 January; 13:30	(Russia) Koronas-Foton	Roscosmos / MEPhI / NIIEM	Low Earth	Heliophysics	In orbit	Spacecraft failure
30 January; 13:30	Final flight of Tsyklon-3 rocket, satellite problems during mid-2009, loss of signal in early December due to power system malfunction. Declared a total loss in April 2010.					
← Jan; Feb; Mar; Apr; May; Jun; Jul; Aug; Sep; Oct; Nov; Dec →; === February ===
2 February; 18:36	(Iran) Safir	GBS.0092	(Iran) Semnan		(Iran) ISA	
2 February; 18:36	(Iran) Omid	ISA	Low Earth	Technology demonstration	25 April	Successful
2 February; 18:36	First successful Iranian orbital launch					
6 February; 10:22:01	(United States) Delta II 7320-10C		(United States) Vandenberg SLC-2W		(United States) United Launch Alliance	
6 February; 10:22:01	(United States) NOAA-19 (NOAA-N')	NOAA / NASA	Low Earth (SSO)	Meteorology	In orbit	Operational
10 February; 05:49:46	(Russia) Soyuz-U		(Kazakhstan) Baikonur Site 31/6		(Russia) Roscosmos	
10 February; 05:49:46	(Russia) Progress M-66	Roscosmos	Low Earth (ISS)	ISS logistics	18 May; 15:14:45	Successful
10 February; 05:49:46	ISS flight 32P					
11 February; 00:03	(Russia) Proton-M / Briz-M Enhanced		(Kazakhstan) Baikonur Site 200/39		(Russia) Khrunichev	
11 February; 00:03	(Russia) Ekspress-AM44	RSCC	Geosynchronous	Communication	In orbit	Operational
11 February; 00:03	(Russia) Ekspress-MD1	RSCC	Geosynchronous	Communications	In orbit	Operational
12 February; 22:09:00	(France) Ariane 5 ECA		(France) Kourou ELA-3		(France) Arianespace	
12 February; 22:09:00	(France) Hot Bird 10	Eutelsat	Geosynchronous	Communications	In orbit	Operational
12 February; 22:09:00	(Netherlands) NSS-9	SES New Skies	Geosynchronous	Communications	In orbit	Operational
12 February; 22:09:00	(France) Spirale-A	CNES	Highly elliptical	Technology demonstration	In orbit	Operational
12 February; 22:09:00	(France) Spirale-B	CNES	Highly elliptical	Technology demonstration	In orbit	Operational
24 February; 09:55:30	(United States) Taurus-XL 3110		(United States) Vandenberg LC-576E		(United States) Orbital Sciences	
24 February; 09:55:30	(United States) OCO	NASA	Intended: Low Earth (SSO)	Climatology	24 February	Launch failure
24 February; 09:55:30	Maiden flight of Taurus-XL 3110, payload fairing failed to separate, failed to reach orbit. Satellite was to have been part of A-train constellation					
26 February; 18:29:55	(Ukraine) Zenit-3SLB		(Kazakhstan) Baikonur Site 45/1		(United Nations) Land Launch	
26 February; 18:29:55	(Canada) Telstar 11N	Telesat	Geosynchronous	Communications	In orbit	Operational
28 February; 04:10	(Russia) Proton-K / DM-2		(Kazakhstan) Baikonur Site 81/24		(Russia) Khrunichev	
28 February; 04:10	(Russia) Raduga-1	VKS	Geosynchronous	Communications	In orbit	Operational
← Jan; Feb; Mar; Apr; May; Jun; Jul; Aug; Sep; Oct; Nov; Dec →; === March ===
7 March; 03:49:57	(United States) Delta II 7925-10L		(United States) Cape Canaveral SLC-17B		(United States) United Launch Alliance	
7 March; 03:49:57	(United States) Kepler	NASA	Heliocentric	Exoplanetary science	In orbit	Operational
7 March; 03:49:57	Exosolar planet research, operating in an Earth-trailing orbit					
15 March; 23:43:44	(United States) Space Shuttle Discovery		(United States) Kennedy LC-39A		(United States) United Space Alliance	
15 March; 23:43:44	(United States) STS-119	NASA	Low Earth (ISS)	ISS assembly	28 March; 19:13	Successful
15 March; 23:43:44	(United Nations) ITS S6 Truss	NASA	Low Earth (ISS)	ISS assembly	In orbit	Operational
15 March; 23:43:44	Crewed flight with seven astronauts.					
17 March; 14:21	(Russia) Rokot / Briz-KM		(Russia) Plesetsk Site 133/3		rocket= (France) (Russia) Eurockot	
17 March; 14:21	GOCE	ESA	Low Earth	Gravitational research	11 November 2013; 00:16	Successful
24 March; 08:34:00	(United States) Delta II 7925-9.5		(United States) Cape Canaveral SLC-17A		(United States) United Launch Alliance	
24 March; 08:34:00	(United States) USA-203 (GPS IIR-20/M7)	U.S. Air Force	Medium Earth	Navigation	In orbit	Partial spacecraft failure Operational
26 March; 11:49:06	(Russia) Soyuz-FG		(Kazakhstan) Baikonur Site 1/5		(Russia) Roscosmos	
26 March; 11:49:06	(Russia) Soyuz TMA-14	Roscosmos	Low Earth (ISS)	Expedition 19	11 October; 04:32	Successful
26 March; 11:49:06	Crewed flight with three cosmonauts. First space tourist to make two flights.					
← Jan; Feb; Mar; Apr; May; Jun; Jul; Aug; Sep; Oct; Nov; Dec →; === April ===
3 April; 16:24	(Russia) Proton-M / Briz-M Enhanced		(Kazakhstan) Baikonur Site 200/39		(Russia) (United States) International Launch Services	
3 April; 16:24	(France) Eutelsat W2A	Eutelsat	Geosynchronous	Communications	In orbit	Operational
4 April; 00:31	(United States) Atlas V 421		(United States) Cape Canaveral SLC-41		(United States) United Launch Alliance	
4 April; 00:31	(United States) USA-204 (WGS-2)	U.S. Air Force	Geosynchronous	Communications	In orbit	Operational
5 April; 02:30:15	(North Korea) Unha-2		(North Korea) Tonghae		(North Korea) KCST	
5 April; 02:30:15	(North Korea) Kwangmyŏngsŏng-2	KCST	Intended: Low Earth	Technology demonstration	5 April	Launch failure
5 April; 02:30:15	North Korea claimed the launch was successful; however, no objects were tracked in orbit.					
14 April; 16:16	(China) Long March 3C		(China) Xichang LA-2		(China) CNSA	
14 April; 16:16	(China) Compass-G2	CNSA	Geosynchronous	Navigation	In orbit	Spacecraft failure
14 April; 16:16	Failed in orbit shortly after launch. Towed to a high graveyard orbit by Shijian-21 on 22 January 2022.					
20 April; 01:15	(India) PSLV-CA		(India) Satish Dhawan SLP		(India) ISRO	
20 April; 01:15	(India) RISAT-2	ISRO	Low Earth	Radar imaging	30 October 2022; 00:06	Successful
20 April; 01:15	(India) ANUSAT	Anna University	Low Earth	Technology demonstration	18 April 2012	Successful
20 April; 08:16	(Ukraine) Zenit-3SL		(Norway) Ocean Odyssey		(United Nations) Sea Launch	
20 April; 08:16	(Italy) Sicral-1B	ASI	Geosynchronous	Communications	In orbit	Operational
22 April; 02:55	(China) Long March 2C		(China) Taiyuan LC-1		(China) CASC	
22 April; 02:55	(China) Yaogan-6	CNSA	Low Earth (SSO)	Earth observation	In orbit	Operational
29 April; 16:58	(Russia) Soyuz-U		(Russia) Plesetsk Site 16/2		(Russia) VKS	
29 April; 16:58	(Russia) Kosmos 2450 (Kobal't-M)	VKS	Low Earth	Optical reconnaissance	27 July	Successful
← Jan; Feb; Mar; Apr; May; Jun; Jul; Aug; Sep; Oct; Nov; Dec →; === May ===
5 May; 20:24:25	(United States) Delta II 7920-10C		(United States) Vandenberg SLC-2W		(United States) United Launch Alliance	
5 May; 20:24:25	(United States) USA-205 (STSS-ATRR)	U.S. Air Force / MDA	Low Earth (SSO)	Missile defence Technology demonstration	In orbit	Operational
7 May; 18:37	(Russia) Soyuz-U		(Kazakhstan) Baikonur Site 1/5		(Russia) Roscosmos	
7 May; 18:37	(Russia) Progress M-02M	Roscosmos	Low Earth (ISS)	ISS logistics	13 July; 16:28:47	Successful
7 May; 18:37	ISS flight 33P					
11 May; 18:01	(United States) Space Shuttle Atlantis		(United States) Kennedy LC-39A		(United States) United Space Alliance	
11 May; 18:01	(United States) STS-125	NASA	Low Earth (HST)	HST servicing flight	24 May; 15:39	Successful
11 May; 18:01	Crewed flight with seven astronauts, final Space Shuttle mission to the Hubble Space Telescope.					
14 May; 13:12	(France) Ariane 5 ECA		(France) Kourou ELA-3		(France) Arianespace	
14 May; 13:12	Herschel	ESA	Sun–Earth L_{2}	Infrared astronomy	In orbit	Operational
14 May; 13:12	Planck	ESA	Sun–Earth L_{2}	Space telescope	In orbit	Operational
16 May; 00:57	(Russia) Proton-M / Briz-M Enhanced		(Kazakhstan) Baikonur Site 200/39		(Russia) (United States) International Launch Services	
16 May; 00:57	(Bermuda) ProtoStar II	ProtoStar	Geosynchronous	Communications	In orbit	Operational
19 May; 23:55	(United States) Minotaur I		(United States) MARS LP-0B		(United States) Orbital Sciences	
19 May; 23:55	(United States) TacSat-3	USAF-RL	Low Earth	Technology demonstration	30 April 2012	Successful
19 May; 23:55	(United States) PharmaSat	NASA	Low Earth	Biological	14 August 2012	Successful
19 May; 23:55	⚀ (United States) AeroCube 3	Aerospace Corporation	Low Earth	Technology demonstration	6 January 2011	Successful
19 May; 23:55	⚀ (United States) HawkSat I	HISS	Low Earth	Technology demonstration	4 September 2011	Successful
19 May; 23:55	⚀ (United States) CP6	CalPoly	Low Earth	Technology demonstration	6 October 2011	Successful
19 May; 23:55	All payloads except TacSat-3 and Pharmasat are CubeSats.					
21 May; 21:53	(Russia) Soyuz-2.1a / Fregat		(Russia) Plesetsk Site 43/4		(Russia) RVSN RF	
21 May; 21:53	(Russia) Meridian 2	VKS	Intended: Molniya; Achieved: Medium Earth	Communications	23 April 2021; 04:48	Launch failure
21 May; 21:53	Core vehicle second stage shut down five seconds early, attempt to compensate using Fregat resulted in propellent depletion during second of three burns Satellite reached a lower orbit than expected, and despite being expected to be recoverable to fully operational status was unable to recover.					
27 May; 10:34:42	(Russia) Soyuz-FG		(Kazakhstan) Baikonur Site 1/5		(Russia) Roscosmos	
27 May; 10:34:42	(Russia) Soyuz TMA-15	Roscosmos	Low Earth (ISS)	Expedition 20	1 December; 07:17	Successful
27 May; 10:34:42	Crewed flight with three cosmonauts, established first permanent six-man crew on the ISS.					
← Jan; Feb; Mar; Apr; May; Jun; Jul; Aug; Sep; Oct; Nov; Dec →; === June ===
18 June; 21:32	(United States) Atlas V 401		(United States) Cape Canaveral SLC-41		(United States) United Launch Alliance	
18 June; 21:32	(United States) LRO	NASA	Selenocentric	Lunar orbiter	In orbit	Operational
18 June; 21:32	(United States) LCROSS	NASA	High Earth (TLI)	Lunar impactor	9 October; 11:37	Successful
18 June; 21:32	LCROSS observed the upper stage impacting the Cabeus crater on the Moon at 11:31 on 9 October shortly before its own impact into the same crater. The LCROSS spacecraft confirmed the presence of water at the Lunar South Pole.					
21 June; 21:50	(Ukraine) Zenit-3SLB		(Kazakhstan) Baikonur Site 45/1		(United Nations) Land Launch	
21 June; 21:50	(Malaysia) MEASAT-3a	MEASAT	Geosynchronous	Communications	In orbit	Operational
27 June; 22:51	(United States) Delta IV-M+ (4,2)		(United States) Cape Canaveral SLC-37B		(United States) United Launch Alliance	
27 June; 22:51	(United States) GOES-O (GOES-14)	NOAA / NASA	Geosynchronous	Meteorology	In orbit	Operational
30 June; 19:10	(Russia) Proton-M / Briz-M Enhanced		(Kazakhstan) Baikonur Site 200/39		(Russia) (United States) International Launch Services	
30 June; 19:10	(United States) Sirius FM-5 (RadioSat-5)	Sirius XM	Geosynchronous	Communications	In orbit	Operational
← Jan; Feb; Mar; Apr; May; Jun; Jul; Aug; Sep; Oct; Nov; Dec →; === July ===
1 July; 17:52	(France) Ariane 5 ECA		(France) Kourou ELA-3		(France) Arianespace	
1 July; 17:52	(United States) TerreStar-1	TerreStar	Geosynchronous	Communications	In orbit	Operational
6 July; 01:26	(Russia) Rokot / Briz-KM		(Russia) Plesetsk Site 133/3		(Russia) VKS	
6 July; 01:26	(Russia) Kosmos 2451 (Rodnik)	VKS	Low Earth	Communications	In orbit	Operational
6 July; 01:26	(Russia) Kosmos 2452 (Rodnik)	VKS	Low Earth	Communications	In orbit	Operational
6 July; 01:26	(Russia) Kosmos 2453 (Rodnik)	VKS	Low Earth	Communications	In orbit	Operational
14 July; 03:35	(United States) Falcon 1		(Marshall Islands) Omelek		(United States) SpaceX	
14 July; 03:35	(Malaysia) RazakSat-1 (MACSat)	ATSB	Low Earth	Earth observation	In orbit	Spacecraft failure
14 July; 03:35	Final flight of Falcon 1.					
15 July; 22:03	(United States) Space Shuttle Endeavour		(United States) Kennedy LC-39A		(United States) United Space Alliance	
15 July; 22:03	(United States) STS-127	NASA	Low Earth (ISS)	ISS assembly	31 July; 14:48	Successful
15 July; 22:03	(United Nations) JEM-EF	JAXA	Low Earth (ISS)	ISS assembly	In orbit	Operational
15 July; 22:03	(United States) AggieSat 2	NASA	Low Earth	Technology demonstration	17 March 2010; 18:26	Partial spacecraft failure Successful
15 July; 22:03	(United States) BEVO-1	NASA	Low Earth	Technology demonstration	17 March 2010; 18:26	Partial spacecraft failure Successful
15 July; 22:03	(United States) Castor	NRL	Low Earth	Atmospheric science	18 August 2010; 17:48	Successful
15 July; 22:03	(United States) Pollux	NRL	Low Earth	Atmospheric science	29 March 2010	Successful
15 July; 22:03	Crewed flight with seven astronauts, AggieSat 2 and BEVO-1 collectively designated Dragonsat, Castor and Pollux collectively designated ANDE-2, both deployed on 30 July; Dragonsat at 12:34:30 UTC and ANDE-2 at 17:23:02; Dragonsat satellites failed to separate from each other.					
21 July; 03:57:43	(Russia) Kosmos-3M		(Russia) Plesetsk Site 132/1		(Russia) RVSN RF	
21 July; 03:57:43	(Russia) Kosmos 2454 (Parus)	VKS	Low Earth	Navigation; Communications	In orbit	Operational
21 July; 03:57:43	(Russia) Sterkh-1	Roscosmos	Low Earth	Communications; Search and rescue	In orbit	Spacecraft failure
24 July; 10:56:51	(Russia) Soyuz-U		(Kazakhstan) Baikonur Site 1/5		(Russia) Roscosmos	
24 July; 10:56:51	(Russia) Progress M-67	Roscosmos	Low Earth (ISS)	ISS logistics	27 September; 10:19:11	Successful
24 July; 10:56:51	Final flight of original Progress-M; ISS flight 34P					
29 July; 18:46	(Ukraine) Dnepr		(Kazakhstan) Baikonur Site 109/95		(Russia) ISC Kosmotras	
29 July; 18:46	(United Arab Emirates) DubaiSat-1	EIAST	Low Earth (SSO)	Earth observation	In orbit	Operational
29 July; 18:46	(Spain) Deimos-1	Deimos Space	Low Earth (SSO)	Earth observation	In orbit	Operational
29 July; 18:46	(United Kingdom) UK-DMC 2	BNSC (2009-2010); UKSA (2010—)	Low Earth (SSO)	Earth observation	In orbit	Operational
29 July; 18:46	(Spain) Nanosat 1B	INTA	Low Earth (SSO)	Earth observation	In orbit	Operational
29 July; 18:46	(Argentina) AprizeSat-3	LatinSat	Low Earth (SSO)	Communications	In orbit	Operational
29 July; 18:46	(Argentina) AprizeSat-4	LatinSat	Low Earth (SSO)	Communications	In orbit	Operational
← Jan; Feb; Mar; Apr; May; Jun; Jul; Aug; Sep; Oct; Nov; Dec →; === August ===
11 August; 19:47	(Russia) Proton-M / Briz-M		(Kazakhstan) Baikonur Site 200/39		(Russia) (United States) International Launch Services	
11 August; 19:47	(China) AsiaSat 5	AsiaSat	Geosynchronous	Communications	In orbit	Operational
17 August; 10:35:00	(United States) Delta II 7925-9.5		(United States) Cape Canaveral SLC-17A		(United States) United Launch Alliance	
17 August; 10:35:00	(United States) USA-206 (GPS IIR-21/M8)	U.S. Air Force	Medium Earth	Navigation	In orbit	Operational
17 August; 10:35:00	Final launch from SLC-17A, final GPS IIR launch, final flight of Delta II 7925					
21 August; 22:09	(France) Ariane 5 ECA		(France) Kourou ELA-3		(France) Arianespace	
21 August; 22:09	(Japan) JCSAT-12	SKY Perfect JSAT Group	Geosynchronous	Communications	In orbit	Operational
21 August; 22:09	(Australia) Optus D3	Optus	Geosynchronous	Communications	In orbit	Operational
25 August; 08:00	(Russia) (South Korea) Naro-1		(South Korea) Naro		(Russia) (South Korea) Khrunichev / KARI	
25 August; 08:00	(South Korea) STSAT-2A	KARI	Intended: Low Earth	Technology demonstration	25 August	Launch failure
25 August; 08:00	Maiden flight of Naro-1, first South Korean orbital launch attempt (with Russian assistance). First flight of Angara Universal Rocket Module (used as first stage), half of payload fairing failed to separate, failed to reach orbit.					
29 August; 03:59	(United States) Space Shuttle Discovery		(United States) Kennedy LC-39A		(United States) United Space Alliance	
29 August; 03:59	(United States) STS-128	NASA	Low Earth (ISS)	ISS assembly	11 September; 00:53	Successful
29 August; 03:59	(Italy) (United States) Leonardo MPLM	ASI / NASA	Low Earth (ISS)	ISS logistics	11 September; 00:53	Successful
29 August; 03:59	Crewed flight with seven astronauts.					
31 August; 09:28	(China) Long March 3B		(China) Xichang		(China) CASC	
31 August; 09:28	(Indonesia) Palapa-D	Indosat	Geosynchronous	Communications	In orbit	Partial launch failure Operational
31 August; 09:28	Third stage failed during restart due to gas generator burn-through.					
← Jan; Feb; Mar; Apr; May; Jun; Jul; Aug; Sep; Oct; Nov; Dec →; === September ===
8 September; 21:35	(United States) Atlas V 401		(United States) Cape Canaveral SLC-41		(United States) United Launch Alliance	
8 September; 21:35	(United States) USA-207 (PAN)	NRO	Geosynchronous	Reconnaissance	In orbit	Operational
10 September; 17:01:46	(Japan) H-IIB		(Japan) Tanegashima LA-Y2		(Japan) JAXA	
10 September; 17:01:46	(Japan) HTV-1	JAXA	Low Earth (ISS)	ISS logistics	1 November; 21:26	Successful
10 September; 17:01:46	Maiden flight of H-IIB and H-II Transfer Vehicle, first launch from LA-Y2.					
17 September; 15:55:07	(Russia) Soyuz-2.1b / Fregat		(Kazakhstan) Baikonur Site 31/6		(Russia) Roscosmos	
17 September; 15:55:07	(Russia) Meteor-M No.1	Roscosmos	Low Earth (SSO)	Meteorology	In orbit	Successful
17 September; 15:55:07	(Russia) BLITS	Roscosmos	Low Earth (SSO)	Geodesy, satellite laser ranging	In orbit	Operational
17 September; 15:55:07	(Russia) (European Union) IRIS	NPO Lavochkin / EADS Astrium	Low Earth (SSO)	Technology demonstration	12 March 2021	Successful
17 September; 15:55:07	(Russia) Sterkh-2	Roscosmos	Low Earth (SSO)	Communications; Search and rescue	In orbit	Spacecraft failure
17 September; 15:55:07	(South Africa) SumbandilaSat	Stellenbosch	Low Earth (SSO)	Technology demonstration	10 December 2021	Spacecraft failure; Partial success
17 September; 15:55:07	(Russia) UGATUSAT	UGATU	Low Earth (SSO)	Earth observation	In orbit	Spacecraft failure
17 September; 15:55:07	(Russia) Universitetsky-Tatyana-2	MSU	Low Earth (SSO)	Technology demonstration	In orbit	Spacecraft failure; Partial success
17 September; 15:55:07	Meteor M-1 was a replacement for Meteor-3M No.1. IRIS intentionally remained attached to upper stage.					
17 September; 19:19:19	(Russia) Proton-M / Briz-M Enhanced		(Kazakhstan) Baikonur Site 200/39		(Russia) (United States) International Launch Services	
17 September; 19:19:19	(Canada) Nimiq 5	Telesat Canada	Geosynchronous	Communications	In orbit	Operational
23 September; 06:21	(India) PSLV-CA		(India) Satish Dhawan FLP		(India) ISRO	
23 September; 06:21	(India) Oceansat-2	ISRO	Low Earth (SSO)	Oceanography	In orbit	Operational
23 September; 06:21	(Germany) Rubin 9.1	OHB-System	Low Earth (SSO)	Technology demonstration	In orbit	Successful
23 September; 06:21	(Germany) Rubin 9.2	OHB-System	Low Earth (SSO)	Technology demonstration	In orbit	Successful
23 September; 06:21	⚀ (Germany) BeeSat-1	TU Berlin	Low Earth (SSO)	Technology demonstration	In orbit	Operational
23 September; 06:21	⚀ (Turkey) ITU-pSat1	ITU	Low Earth (SSO)	Technology demonstration	In orbit	Operational
23 September; 06:21	⚀ (Switzerland) SwissCube-1	EPFL	Low Earth (SSO)	Atmospheric science	In orbit	Operational
23 September; 06:21	⚀ (Germany) UWE-2	Würzburg	Low Earth (SSO)	Technology demonstration	In orbit	Operational
23 September; 06:21	First Swiss satellite, Rubin payloads intentionally remained attached to upper stage.					
25 September; 12:20	(United States) Delta II 7920-10C		(United States) Cape Canaveral SLC-17B		(United States) United Launch Alliance	
25 September; 12:20	(United States) USA-208 (STSS-Demo 1)	U.S. Air Force	Low Earth	Technology demonstration Missile defence	In orbit	Successful
25 September; 12:20	(United States) USA-209 (STSS-Demo 2)	U.S. Air Force	Low Earth	Technology demonstration Missile defence	In orbit	Successful
30 September; 07:14	(Russia) Soyuz-FG		(Kazakhstan) Baikonur Site 1/5		(Russia) Roscosmos	
30 September; 07:14	(Russia) Soyuz TMA-16	Roscosmos	Low Earth (ISS)	Expedition 21	18 March 2010	Successful
30 September; 07:14	Crewed flight with three cosmonauts					
← Jan; Feb; Mar; Apr; May; Jun; Jul; Aug; Sep; Oct; Nov; Dec →; === October ===
1 October; 21:59	(France) Ariane 5 ECA		(France) Kourou ELA-3		(France) Arianespace	
1 October; 21:59	(Spain) Amazonas-2	Hispasat	Geosynchronous	Communications	In orbit	Operational
1 October; 21:59	(Germany) COMSATBw-1	Bundeswehr	Geosynchronous	Communications	In orbit	Operational
8 October; 18:51	(United States) Delta II 7920		(United States) Vandenberg SLC-2W		(United States) United Launch Alliance	
8 October; 18:51	(United States) WorldView-2	DigitalGlobe	Low Earth (SSO)	Earth observation	In orbit	Operational
15 October; 01:14	(Russia) Soyuz-U		(Kazakhstan) Baikonur Site 1/5		(Russia) Roscosmos	
15 October; 01:14	(Russia) Progress M-03M	Roscosmos	Low Earth (ISS)	ISS logistics	27 April 2010; 18:50:56	Successful
15 October; 01:14	ISS flight 35P					
18 October; 16:12	(United States) Atlas V 401		(United States) Vandenberg SLC-3E		(United States) United Launch Alliance	
18 October; 16:12	(United States) USA-210 (DMSP-5D3 F18)	U.S. Air Force / NOAA	Low Earth (SSO)	Meteorology	In orbit	Operational
29 October; 20:00	(France) Ariane 5 ECA		(France) Kourou ELA-3		(France) Arianespace	
29 October; 20:00	(Norway) Thor-6	Telenor	Geosynchronous	Communications	In orbit	Operational
29 October; 20:00	(Netherlands) NSS-12	SES World Skies	Geosynchronous	Communications	In orbit	Operational
← Jan; Feb; Mar; Apr; May; Jun; Jul; Aug; Sep; Oct; Nov; Dec →; === November ===
2 November; 01:50	(Russia) Rokot / Briz-KM		(Russia) Plesetsk Site 133/3		rocket= (France) (Russia) Eurockot	
2 November; 01:50	SMOS	ESA	Low Earth (SSO)	Earth observation	In orbit	Operational
2 November; 01:50	Proba-2	ESA	Low Earth (SSO)	Earth observation	In orbit	Operational
10 November; 14:22	(Russia) Soyuz-U		(Kazakhstan) Baikonur Site 1/5		(Russia) Roscosmos	
10 November; 14:22	(Russia) Progress M-MIM2	Roscosmos	Low Earth (ISS)	Orbital tug	8 December; 05:27	Successful
10 November; 14:22	(United Nations) Poisk (MRM-2)	Roscosmos	Low Earth (ISS)	ISS assembly	In orbit	Operational
10 November; 14:22	ISS flight 5R					
12 November; 02:45	(China) Long March 2C		(China) Jiuquan LA-4		(China) CASC	
12 November; 02:45	(China) Shijian 11-01	CASC	Low Earth (SSO)	Technology demonstration	In orbit	Operational
16 November; 19:28	(United States) Space Shuttle Atlantis		(United States) Kennedy LC-39A		(United States) United Space Alliance	
16 November; 19:28	(United States) STS-129	NASA	Low Earth (ISS)	ISS assembly	27 November; 14:44	Successful
16 November; 19:28	(United Nations) ExPRESS-1	NASA	Low Earth (ISS)	ISS logistics	In orbit	Operational
16 November; 19:28	(United Nations) ExPRESS-2	NASA	Low Earth (ISS)	ISS logistics	In orbit	Operational
16 November; 19:28	Crewed flight, launching with six astronauts, and landing with seven.					
20 November; 10:44	(Russia) Soyuz-U		(Russia) Plesetsk Site 16/2		(Russia) RVSN RF	
20 November; 10:44	(Russia) Kosmos 2455 (Lotos-S)	VKS	Low Earth	ELINT	In orbit	Operational
23 November; 06:55	(United States) Atlas V 431		(United States) Cape Canaveral SLC-41		(United States) United Launch Alliance	
23 November; 06:55	(United Nations) Intelsat 14	Intelsat	Geosynchronous	Communications	In orbit	Operational
24 November; 14:19	(Russia) Proton-M / Briz-M Enhanced		(Kazakhstan) Baikonur Site 200/39		(Russia) (United States) International Launch Services	
24 November; 14:19	(France) Eutelsat W7	Eutelsat	Geosynchronous	Communications	In orbit	Operational
28 November; 01:21	(Japan) H-IIA 202		(Japan) Tanegashima LA-Y1		(Japan) Mitsubishi	
28 November; 01:21	(Japan) IGS Optical 3	CSICE	Low Earth (SSO)	Reconnaissance	In orbit	Successful
30 November; 21:00	(Ukraine) Zenit-3SLB		(Kazakhstan) Baikonur Site 45/1		(United Nations) Land Launch	
30 November; 21:00	(United Nations) Intelsat 15	Intelsat	Geosynchronous	Communications	In orbit	Operational
← Jan; Feb; Mar; Apr; May; Jun; Jul; Aug; Sep; Oct; Nov; Dec →; === December ===
6 December; 01:47	(United States) Delta IV-M+ (5,4)		(United States) Cape Canaveral SLC-37B		(United States) United Launch Alliance	
6 December; 01:47	(United States) USA-211 (WGS-3)	U.S. Air Force	Geosynchronous	Communications	In orbit	Successful
6 December; 01:47	Maiden flight of Delta IV-M+ (5,4), final Block I WGS satellite.					
9 December; 08:42	(China) Long March 2D		(China) Jiuquan SLS-2		(China) CASC	
9 December; 08:42	(China) Yaogan-7	CNSA	Low Earth (SSO)	Earth observation	In orbit	Operational
14 December; 10:38	(Russia) Proton-M / DM-2 Enhanced		(Kazakhstan) Baikonur Site 81/24		(Russia) Khrunichev	
14 December; 10:38	(Russia) Kosmos 2456 (Glonass-M 730)	VKS	Medium Earth	Navigation	In orbit	Operational
14 December; 10:38	(Russia) Kosmos 2457 (Glonass-M 733)	VKS	Medium Earth	Navigation	In orbit	Operational
14 December; 10:38	(Russia) Kosmos 2458 (Glonass-M 734)	VKS	Medium Earth	Navigation	In orbit	Operational
14 December; 14:09	(United States) Delta II 7320		(United States) Vandenberg SLC-2W		(United States) United Launch Alliance	
14 December; 14:09	(United States) WISE	NASA	Low Earth (SSO)	Infrared astronomy	In orbit	Operational
15 December; 02:31	(China) Long March 4C		(China) Taiyuan LC-2		(China) CASC	
15 December; 02:31	(China) Yaogan-8	CNSA	Low Earth (SSO)	Earth observation	In orbit	Operational
15 December; 02:31	(China) Xiwang 1	CNSA	Low Earth (SSO)	Amateur radio	In orbit	Operational
18 December; 16:26	(France) Ariane 5GS		(France) Kourou ELA-3		(France) Arianespace	
18 December; 16:26	(France) Helios IIB	DGA	Low Earth (SSO)	Reconnaissance	In orbit	Operational
18 December; 16:26	Final flight of Ariane 5GS.					
20 December; 21:52	(Russia) Soyuz-FG		(Kazakhstan) Baikonur Site 1/5		(Russia) Roscosmos	
20 December; 21:52	(Russia) Soyuz TMA-17	Roscosmos	Low Earth (ISS)	Expedition 22	2 June 2010; 03:25	Successful
20 December; 21:52	Crewed flight with three cosmonauts.					
29 December; 00:22	(Russia) Proton-M / Briz-M Enhanced		(Kazakhstan) Baikonur Site 200/39		(Russia) (United States) International Launch Services	
29 December; 00:22	(United States) DirecTV-12	DirecTV	Geosynchronous	Communications	In orbit	Operational

- ← Jan
- Feb
- Mar
- Apr
- May
- Jun
- Jul
- Aug
- Sep
- Oct
- Nov
- Dec →

== Suborbital flights ==
Date and time (UTC)	Rocket	Flight number	Launch site		LSP	
Date and time (UTC)	Payload (⚀ = CubeSat)	Operator	Orbit	Function	Decay (UTC)	Outcome
Date and time (UTC)	Remarks					
26 January; 00:15	(Japan) S-310		(Norway) Andøya LA-U3		(Japan) ISAS	
26 January; 00:15	(Japan) Delta-2	JAXA/Nagoya	Suborbital	Auroral	26 January	Successful
29 January; 09:49	(Canada) Black Brant IX		(United States) Poker Flat		(United States) NASA	
29 January; 09:49	(United States) ACES-I	University of Iowa	Suborbital	Auroral	09:59	Successful
29 January; 09:51	(Canada) Black Brant VB		(United States) Poker Flat		(United States) NASA	
29 January; 09:51	(United States) ACES-II	University of Iowa	Suborbital	Auroral	10:01	Successful
13 February	(United States) UGM-133 Trident II D5		(United States) USS Alabama, Pacific Ocean		(United States) U.S. Navy	
13 February		U.S. Navy	Suborbital	Missile test	13 February	Successful
18 February; 09:52:00	(United States) Terrier-Orion		(United States) Poker Flat		(United States) NASA	
18 February; 09:52:00		Clemson	Suborbital	Atmospheric	18 February	Successful
18 February; 10:29:00	(United States) Terrier-Orion		(United States) Poker Flat		(United States) NASA	
18 February; 10:29:00		Clemson	Suborbital	Atmospheric	18 February	Successful
18 February; 10:59:00	(United States) Terrier-Orion		(United States) Poker Flat		(United States) NASA	
18 February; 10:59:00		Clemson	Suborbital	Atmospheric	18 February	Successful
18 February; 11:47:00	(United States) Terrier-Orion		(United States) Poker Flat		(United States) NASA	
18 February; 11:47:00		Clemson	Suborbital	Atmospheric	18 February	Successful
25 February; 10:45	(Canada) Black Brant IX		(United States) White Sands LC-36		(United States) NASA	
25 February; 10:45	(United States) CIBER	Caltech	Suborbital	IR Astronomy	10:55	Successful
February	(United States) UGM-133 Trident II D5		(United States) Submarine, Pacific Ocean		(United States) U.S. Navy	
February		U.S. Navy	Suborbital	Missile test	February	Successful
6 March; 10:54	(India) Dhanush		(India) Ship, Indian Ocean		(India) DRDO	
6 March; 10:54		DRDO	Suborbital	Target	6 March	Successful
6 March; 10:54	Target for successful Prithvi interceptor test, apogee: 120 kilometres (75 mi)					
18 March; 00:25	(United States) TRBM	FTT-10a	(United States) USS Tripoli, Barking Sands		(United States) U.S. Army	
18 March; 00:25		U.S. Army/MDA	Suborbital	Target	18 March	Successful
18 March; 00:25	Intercepted by THAAD launched at 00:30 UTC					
18 March; 00:30	(United States) THAAD	FTT-10a	(United States) Barking Sands		(United States) U.S. Army	
18 March; 00:30		U.S. Army/MDA	Suborbital	ABM test	18 March	Successful
18 March; 00:30	Intercepted target missile					
18 March; 00:30	(United States) THAAD	FTT-10a	(United States) Barking Sands		(United States) U.S. Army	
18 March; 00:30		U.S. Army/MDA	Suborbital	ABM test	18 March	Successful
18 March; 00:30	Backup interceptor, destroyed by range safety after first missile succeeded					
20 March; 11:04	(Canada) Black Brant XII		(United States) Poker Flat		(United States) NASA	
20 March; 11:04	(United States) Cascades-2	Dartmouth	Suborbital	Auroral	20 March	Successful
25 March; 13:25	(United States) Hera		(United States) Fort Wingate LC-96		(United States) U.S. Army	
25 March; 13:25		U.S. Army	Suborbital	Target	25 March	Successful
25 March; 13:25	Target for MIM-104 Patriot PAC-3 test, interceptor failed					
7 April	(Israel) Blue Sparrow		F-15 Eagle, Israel		(Israel) Israeli Air Force	
7 April		Israeli Air Force	Suborbital	Arrow-2 target	7 April	Successful
7 April	Arrow-2 target, successfully intercepted					
7 April	(Israel) Arrow-2		(Israel) Negev		Israel Aerospace Industries	
7 April		IAI/Israel Defense Forces	Suborbital	ABM Test	7 April	Successful
7 April	Successful intercept of a Blue Sparrow target over the Mediterranean					
10 April; 09:10	(Russia) RS-12M Topol		(Russia) Plesetsk		(Russia) RVSN RF	
10 April; 09:10		RVSN RF	Suborbital	Missile test	10 April	Successful
17 April; 11:17	(United States) FalconLaunch		(United States) White Sands		(United States) US Air Force Academy	
17 April; 11:17	(United States) FalconLAUNCH VII	US Air Force Academy	Suborbital	Technology demonstration	17 April	Successful
17 April; 11:17	Apogee: 108 kilometres (67 mi), first student-built rocket to reach space					
2 May; 14:02	(United States) SpaceLoft XL		(United States) Spaceport America		(United States) UP Aerospace	
2 May; 14:02	(United States) SL-3	NMSGC	Suborbital	Student research	2 May	Launch failure
2 May; 14:02	(United States) Discovery	Celestis	Suborbital	Space burial	2 May	Launch failure
2 May; 14:02	Failed to reach space due to premature payload separation whilst rocket was still burning					
7 May; 02:42:00	(United States) Terrier-Orion		(Australia) Woomera		(Australia) DSTO	
7 May; 02:42:00	(Australia) (United States) HiFIRE 0	DSTO/AFRL	Suborbital	Technology demonstration	7 May	Successful
19 May; 04:36	(India) Agni II		(India) Integrated Test Range		(India) Indian Army/DRDO	
19 May; 04:36		Indian Army/DRDO	Suborbital	Missile test	+127 seconds	Launch failure
19 May; 04:36	Loss of control, landed in sea 203 kilometres (126 mi) downrange					
20 May	(Iran) Sejjil-2		(Iran) Semnan		(Iran) IRGC	
20 May		IRGC	Suborbital	Missile test	20 May	Successful
20 May	Apogee: 800 kilometres (500 mi)					
22 May; 10:32	(United States) Nike-Orion		(Sweden) Esrange		(European Union) EuroLaunch	
22 May; 10:32	(Germany) MAPHEUS	DLR	Suborbital	Technology demonstration	22 May	Successful
22 May; 10:32	Apogee: 140.8 kilometres (87.5 mi)					
26 May	(United States) UGM-133 Trident II D5		(United Kingdom) HMS Victorious		(United Kingdom) Royal Navy	
26 May		Royal Navy	Suborbital	Missile test	26 July	Successful
28 May; 16:52	(United States) Terrier-Orion		(United States) Wallops Island		(United States) NASA	
28 May; 16:52	(United States) SOAREX VII	NASA	Suborbital		28 May	Successful
29 May	(United States) Improved Orion		(Brazil) Alcântara		(Brazil) AEB	
29 May	(Brazil) Maracati 1	INPE	Suborbital	Microgravity	29 May	Successful
6 June	(United States) Terrier-Lynx		(United States) San Nicolas		(United States) U.S. Air Force	
6 June		U.S. Air Force	Suborbital	YAL-1 target	6 June	Successful
6 June	Apogee: 100 kilometres (62 mi)					
13 June	(United States) Terrier-Lynx		(United States) San Nicolas		(United States) U.S. Air Force	
13 June		U.S. Air Force	Suborbital	YAL-1 target	13 June	Successful
13 June	Apogee: 100 kilometres (62 mi)					
26 June; 09:30	(United States) Terrier-Orion		(United States) Wallops Island LA-2		(United States) NASA	
26 June; 09:30	(United States) RockOn!	University of Colorado	Suborbital	Student research	09:45	Successful
27 June; 07:30	(Canada) Black Brant IX		(United States) White Sands LC-36		(United States) NASA	
27 June; 07:30	(United States) DICE	University of Colorado	Suborbital	UV Astronomy	07:40	Spacecraft failure
29 June; 10:01	(United States) LGM-30G Minuteman III		(United States) Vandenberg		(United States) U.S. Air Force	
29 June; 10:01	(United States) GT-199GM	U.S. Air Force	Suborbital	Missile test	29 June	Successful
5 July	(North Korea) Hwasong-7		(North Korea) Kittaeryong		(North Korea) Korean People's Army Strategic Force	
5 July	(North Korea)	Korean People's Army Strategic Force	Suborbital	Missile test	5 July	Successful
5 July	Apogee: 150 kilometres (93 mi).					
5 July	(North Korea) Hwasong-7		(North Korea) Kittaeryong		(North Korea) Korean People's Army Strategic Force	
5 July	(North Korea)	Korean People's Army Strategic Force	Suborbital	Missile test	5 July	Successful
5 July	Apogee: 150 kilometres (93 mi).					
13 July; 01:20	(Russia) R-29RMU Sineva		(Russia) K-84 Ekaterinburg, North Pole		(Russia) VMF	
13 July; 01:20		VMF	Suborbital	Missile test	13 July	Successful
13 July; 01:20	Carried ten re-entry vehicles, impacted Kura Test Range					
13 July; 23:50	(Russia) R-29RMU Sineva		(Russia) K-117 Bryansk, North Pole		(Russia) VMF	
13 July; 23:50		VMF	Suborbital	Missile test	14 July	Successful
13 July; 23:50	Carried ten re-entry vehicles, impacted Chizha test site					
16 July	(Russia) RSM-56 Bulava		(Russia) TK-208 Dmitri Donskoi, White Sea		(Russia) VMF	
16 July		VMF	Suborbital	Missile test	16 July	Launch failure
16 July	First stage malfunction					
22 July; 03:40	(United States) LRALT		C-17 Globemaster III, Pacific Ocean		(United States) MDA	
22 July; 03:40		MDA/IMDO	Suborbital	ABM target	22 July	Successful
22 July; 03:40	Target for Arrow test, interceptor launch scrubbed					
31 July; 03:40		FTM-17	(United States) Kauai		(United States) MDA	
31 July; 03:40		MDA	Suborbital	ABM target	31 July	Successful
31 July; 03:40	Target for Stellar Avenger test, intercept successful					
31 July; 03:42	(United States) RIM-161 SM-3	FTM-17	(United States) USS Hopper		(United States) MDA	
31 July; 03:42	(United States) Stellar Avenger	MDA	Suborbital	ABM test	31 July	Successful
31 July; 04:00		FTM-17	(United States) Kauai		(United States) MDA	
31 July; 04:00		MDA	Suborbital	ABM target	31 July	Successful
31 July; 04:00	Radar target for exercise after Stellar Avenger, not intercepted					
11 August; 04:50	(Canada) Black Brant IX		(United States) San Nicolas		(United States) NASA	
11 August; 04:50	(United States) MARTI	U.S. Air Force	Suborbital	ABL target	11 August	Successful
17 August; 12:52:00	(Canada) Black Brant IX		(United States) Wallops Island		(United States) NASA	
17 August; 12:52:00	(United States) IRVE-II	NASA	Suborbital	Technology demonstration	17 August	Successful
23 August; 16:01	(United States) LGM-30G Minuteman III		(United States) Vandenberg		(United States) U.S. Air Force	
23 August; 16:01	(United States) GT-200GM	U.S. Air Force	Suborbital	Missile test	23 August	Successful
23 August; 16:01	Travelled 6,743 kilometres (4,190 mi) downrange					
3 September	(United States) UGM-133 Trident II D5		(United States) USS West Virginia, Eastern Range		(United States) U.S. Navy	
3 September		U.S. Navy	Suborbital	Missile test	3 September	Successful
3 September	Apogee: 1,000 kilometres (620 mi)					
4 September	(United States) UGM-133 Trident II D5		(United States) USS West Virginia, Eastern Range		(United States) U.S. Navy	
4 September		U.S. Navy	Suborbital	Missile test	4 September	Successful
4 September	Apogee: 1,000 kilometres (620 mi)					
14 September; 17:40	(Canada) Black Brant IX		(United States) White Sands LC-36		(United States) NASA	
14 September; 17:40	(United States) HERSCHEL	NRL	Suborbital	Solar	14 September	Successful
19 September; 23:32	(Canada) Black Brant XII		(United States) Wallops Island LP-1		(United States) NASA	
19 September; 23:32	(United States) CARE	NRL	Suborbital	Aeronomy	19 September	Successful
27 September	(Iran) Shahab 1		Iran		(Iran) IRGC	
27 September		IRGC	Suborbital	Missile test	27 September	Successful
27 September	Part of Great Prophet IV exercise, apogee: 100 kilometres (62 mi)					
27 September	(Iran) Shahab 2		Iran		(Iran) IRGC	
27 September		IRGC	Suborbital	Missile test	27 September	Successful
27 September	Part of Great Prophet IV exercise, apogee: 100 kilometres (62 mi)					
28 September	(Iran) Shahab 3		Iran		(Iran) IRGC	
28 September		IRGC	Suborbital	Missile test	28 September	Successful
28 September	Part of Great Prophet IV exercise, apogee: 500 kilometres (310 mi)					
28 September	(Iran) Sejjil-1		Iran		(Iran) IRGC	
28 September		IRGC	Suborbital	Missile test	28 September	Successful
28 September	Part of Great Prophet IV exercise, apogee: 800 kilometres (500 mi)					
6 October	(Russia) R-29R Volna		(Russia) K-433 Svyatoy Georgiy Pobedonosets, Sea of Okhotsk		(Russia) VMF	
6 October		VMF	Suborbital	Missile test	6 October	Successful
6 October	Carried four re-entry vehicles					
7 October	(Russia) R-29R Volna		(Russia) K-44 Ryazan, Sea of Okhotsk		(Russia) VMF	
7 October		VMF	Suborbital	Missile test	7 October	Successful
7 October	Carried four re-entry vehicles					
12 October	(India) Prithvi 2		(India) Odisha		(India) Indian Air Force	
12 October		Indian Air Force	Suborbital	Target	12 October	Successful
16 October	(United States) ARAV-B (Terrier-Oriole)		(United States) Kauai		(United States) MDA	
16 October	(United States) FTX-06 Event 2	MDA	Suborbital	ABM target	16 October	Successful
16 October	Radar target, not intercepted					
16 October	(United States) ARAV-B (Terrier-Oriole)		(United States) Kauai		(United States) MDA	
16 October	(United States) FTX-06 Event 3	MDA	Suborbital	ABM target	16 October	Successful
16 October	Radar target, not intercepted					
28 October; 04:00		JFTM-3	(United States) Kauai		(United States) MDA	
28 October; 04:00		JMSDF/MDA	Suborbital	ABM target	28 October	Successful
28 October; 04:00	Apogee: 150 kilometres (93 mi), intercepted by SM-3					
28 October; 04:04	(United States) RIM-161 SM-3	JFTM-3	(Japan) JDS Myōkō, Pacific Ocean		(Japan) JMSDF	
28 October; 04:04		JMSDF	Suborbital	ABM test	28 October	Successful
28 October; 04:04	Apogee: 150 kilometres (93 mi), intercepted target					
1 November	(Russia) R-29RMU Sineva		(Russia) K-117 Bryansk, Barents Sea		(Russia) VMF	
1 November		VMF	Suborbital	Missile test	1 November	Successful
1 November	Carried four re-entry vehicles					
5 November	(United States) ARAV-C (Talos-Castor)		(United States) Kauai		(United States) MDA	
5 November	(United States) FTX-06 Event 4	MDA	Suborbital	ABM target	5 November	Successful
5 November	Radar target, not intercepted					
14 November; 02:30	(Canada) Black Brant IX		(United States) White Sands LC-36		(United States) NASA	
14 November; 02:30	(United States) CyXESS	Colorado	Suborbital	X-ray astronomy	14 November	Successful
22 November; 11:15	(Brazil) VSB-30		(Sweden) Esrange		(European Union) EuroLaunch	
22 November; 11:15	(European Union) TEXUS-46	ESA	Suborbital	Microgravity	22 November	Successful
22 November; 11:15	Apogee: 252 kilometres (157 mi)					
23 November; 14:20	(India) Agni II		(India) Integrated Test Range		(India) Indian Army/DRDO	
23 November; 14:20		Indian Army/DRDO	Suborbital	Missile test	23 November	Launch failure
23 November; 14:20	Loss of control after second stage separation					
29 November; 09:00	(Brazil) VSB-30		(Sweden) Esrange		EuroLaunch	
29 November; 09:00	(European Union) TEXUS-47	ESA	Suborbital	Microgravity	29 November	Successful
29 November; 09:00	Apogee: 264 kilometres (164 mi)					
30 November; 01:38	(New Zealand) Ātea-1		(New Zealand) Great Mercury Island		(New Zealand) Rocket Lab	
30 November; 01:38	(New Zealand) Manu Karere	Rocket Lab	Suborbital	Test flight	30 November	Successful
30 November; 01:38	Apogee: 120 kilometres (75 mi), maiden flight of Ātea-1, first spaceflight to be conducted by New Zealand					
9 December; 06:45	(Russia) RSM-56 Bulava		(Russia) TK-208 Dmitri Donskoi, White Sea		(Russia) VMF	
9 December; 06:45		VMF	Suborbital	Missile test	9 December	Launch failure
9 December; 06:45	Loss of control during third stage burn, caused spiral patterns in the sky above Norway					
10 December; 11:35	(Russia) RS-12M Topol		(Russia) Kapustin Yar		(Russia) RVSN RF	
10 December; 11:35		RVSN RF	Suborbital	Missile test	10 December	Successful
11 December	(United States) LRALT	FTT-11	C-17 Globemaster III, Pacific Ocean		(United States) MDA	
11 December		MDA/IMDO	Suborbital	ABM target	11 December	Launch failure
11 December	Target for THAAD					
13 December	(India) Dhanush		(India) INS Subhadra		(India) Indian Navy	
13 December		Indian Navy	Suborbital	Target	13 December	Successful
16 December	(Iran) Sejjil-2		Iran		(Iran) IRGC	
16 December		IRGC	Suborbital	Missile test	16 December	Successful
16 December	Apogee: 800 kilometres (500 mi)					
17 December; 03:25	(United States) Terrier-Orion		(United States) Wallops Island		(United States) NASA	
17 December; 03:25	(United States) HAROH	ERAU	Suborbital	Aeronomy	17 December	Successful
19 December	(United States) UGM-133 Trident II D5		(United States) USS Alaska		(United States) US Navy	
19 December		U.S. Navy	Suborbital	Test flight	19 December	Successful
19 December	Demonstration and Shakedown Operation					
24 December	(Russia) R-36M2 Voyevoda		(Russia) Dombarovsky		(Russia) RVSN RF	
24 December		RVSN RF	Suborbital	Missile test	24 December	Successful

== Deep space rendezvous ==
Date	Spacecraft	Event	Remarks
7 February	Cassini	50th flyby of Titan	Closest approach: 960 kilometres (600 mi)
12 February	Okina	Lunar impact	Farside of the Moon
17 February	Dawn	Flyby of Mars	Gravity assist, closest approach 549 kilometres (341 mi) at 00:28 GMT
1 March	Chang'e 1	Lunar impact	Deorbited at 07:36 and impacted at 08:13
27 March	Cassini	51st flyby of Titan	Closest approach: 960 kilometres (600 mi)
4 April	Cassini	52nd flyby of Titan	Closest approach: 4,150 kilometres (2,580 mi)
20 April	Cassini	53rd flyby of Titan	Closest approach: 3,600 kilometres (2,200 mi)
5 May	Cassini	54th flyby of Titan	Closest approach: 3,244 kilometres (2,016 mi)
21 May	Cassini	55th flyby of Titan	Closest approach: 965 kilometres (600 mi)
6 June	Cassini	56th flyby of Titan	Closest approach: 965 kilometres (600 mi)
10 June	Kaguya	Lunar Impact	at 18:25 UTC, around Gill crater.
22 June	Cassini	57th flyby of Titan	Closest approach: 955 kilometres (593 mi)
23 June	LRO	Selenocentric orbit insertion	Orbital insersion burn lasted from 09:47 to 10:26 UTC
23 June	LCROSS/Centaur	Lunar flyby	Gravity assist to align for impact in October, closest approach: 3,200 kilometres (2,000 mi) at 10:30:33 UTC
8 July	Cassini	58th flyby of Titan	Closest approach: 965 kilometres (600 mi)
24 July	Cassini	59th flyby of Titan	Closest approach: 955 kilometres (593 mi)
9 August	Cassini	60th flyby of Titan	Closest approach: 970 kilometres (600 mi)
25 August	Cassini	61st flyby of Titan	Closest approach: 970 kilometres (600 mi)
17 September	Artemis P1	Lunar flyby	Closest approach: 43,875 kilometres (27,263 mi) at 00:49 UTC
30 September	MESSENGER	3rd flyby of Mercury	Gravity assist, closest approach: 229 kilometres (142 mi)
9 October	AV-020 Centaur	Lunar impact	2,000-kilogram (4,400 lb) upper stage of the Atlas V rocket used to launch LRO and LCROSS. Impacted Cabeus crater at Lunar South Pole. Impact occurred at 11:31 UTC, and was observed by LCROSS.
9 October	LCROSS (S-S/C)	Lunar impact	700-kilogram (1,500 lb) shepherding spacecraft. Detached from Centaur at 01:50 UTC, and impacted same crater at 11:37.
12 October	Cassini	62nd flyby of Titan	Closest approach: 1,300 kilometres (810 mi)
2 November	Cassini	7th flyby of Enceladus	Closest approach: 103 kilometres (64 mi)
13 November	Rosetta	3rd flyby of Earth	Gravity assist
21 November	Cassini	8th flyby of Enceladus	Closest approach: 1,607 kilometres (999 mi)
8 December	Artemis P1	Lunar flyby	Closest approach: 16,101 kilometres (10,005 mi) at 01:25 UTC
12 December	Cassini	63rd flyby of Titan	Closest approach: 4,850 kilometres (3,010 mi)
28 December	Cassini	64th flyby of Titan	Closest approach: 955 kilometres (593 mi)

Distant, non-targeted flybys of Dione, Mimas, Rhea, Tethys and Titan by Cassini occurred throughout the year.

== EVAs ==
Start date/time	Duration	End time	Spacecraft	Crew	Remarks
10 March; 16:22	4 hours 49 minutes	21:11	Expedition 18; ISS Pirs	(Russia) Yuri Lonchakov (United States) Michael Fincke	Installed the EXPOSE-R experiment, removed tape straps from a docking target on the Pirs docking compartment, inspected and photographed the exterior of the Russian portion of the station.
19 March; 17:16	6 hours 7 minutes	23:23	STS-119; ISS Quest	(United States) Steven Swanson (United States) Richard R. Arnold	Installed the S6 truss to the S5 truss, connected S5/S6 umbilicals, released launch restraints, removed keel pins, stored and removed thermal covers, and deployed the S6 photovoltaic radiator.
21 March; 16:51	6 hours 30 minutes	23:21	STS-119; ISS Quest	(United States) Steven Swanson (United States) Joseph M. Acaba	Advanced preparation of worksite for STS-127, installation of an unpressurised cargo carrier attachment system on the P3 truss, installation of a Global Positioning System antenna to the Kibo laboratory, and infrared imagery of panels of the radiators on the P1 and S1 trusses. Cargo carrier installation unsuccessful
23 March; 15:37	6 hours 27 minutes	22:04	STS-119; ISS Quest	(United States) Joseph M. Acaba (United States) Richard R. Arnold	Relocation of a crew equipment cart, complete the deployment of a cargo carrier, lubricated the station robotic arm's latching end effector B snare bearings, and finish swapping electrical relays to the station's gyroscopes. Cargo carrier deployment unsuccessful
14 May; 12:52	7 hours 20 minutes	20:12	STS-125; Atlantis	(United States) John M. Grunsfeld (United States) Andrew J. Feustel	HST servicing: Replaced the WFPC-2 with WFC-3, replaced the Science Instrument Command and Data Handling Unit, lubricated three shroud doors, installed SCM.
15 May; 12:49	7 hours 56 minutes	20:46	STS-125; Atlantis	(United States) Michael J. Massimino (United States) Michael T. Good	HST servicing: Replaced rate sensing gyroscopes, removed one of two batteries.
16 May; 13:35	6 hours 36 minutes	20:11	STS-125; Atlantis	(United States) John M. Grunsfeld (United States) Andrew J. Feustel	HST servicing: Replaced COSTAR with COS. Repaired ACS, performed get-ahead tasks from EVA-5.
17 May; 13:45	8 hours 2 minutes	21:47	STS-125; Atlantis	(United States) Michael J. Massimino (United States) Michael T. Good	HST servicing: Repaired Space Telescope Imaging Spectrograph.
18 May; 13:20	7 hours 2 minutes	20:22	STS-125; Atlantis	(United States) John M. Grunsfeld (United States) Andrew J. Feustel	HST servicing: Final HST servicing EVA, final EVA from Space Shuttle. Replaced second battery, installed FGS-3, replaced some insulation and a low-gain antenna cover.
5 June; 07:52	4 hours 54 minutes	12:46	Expedition 20; ISS Pirs	(Russia) Gennady Padalka (United States) Michael R. Barratt	Prepared the Zvezda service module transfer compartment for the arrival of the Poisk module, installed docking antenna for the module, photographed antenna for evaluation on the ground, and photographed the Strela-2 crane. First use of the Orlan-MK spacesuit.
10 June; 06:55	12 minutes	07:07	Expedition 20; ISS Zvezda	(Russia) Gennady Padalka (United States) Michael R. Barratt	Internal spacewalk in the depressurised Zvezda transfer compartment, replaced one of the Zvezda hatches with a docking cone, in preparation for the docking of Poisk, later this year.
18 July; 16:19	5 hours 32 minutes	21:51	STS-127; ISS Quest	(United States) David Wolf (United States) Timothy L. Kopra	JEF installed and P3 nadir UCCAS deployed. S3 zenith outboard PAS deploy postponed due to time constraints.
20 July; 15:27	6 hours 53 minutes	22:20	STS-127; ISS Quest	(United States) David Wolf (United States) Thomas Marshburn	Transferred Orbital Replacement Units (ORUs) from the Shuttle Integrated Cargo Carrier (ICC) to the External Stowage Platform-3 (ESP-3). Transferred materials included a spare high-gain antenna, cooling-system pump module and spare parts for the Mobile Servicing System. JEF Visual Equipment (JEF-VE) installation on the forward section was postponed due to time constraints.
22 July; 14:32	5 hours 59 minutes	20:31	STS-127; ISS Quest	(United States) David Wolf (United States) Christopher Cassidy	JPM preparation work, ICS-EF MLI, and P6 battery replacement (2 of 6 units). EVA was cut short due to high levels of CO_{2} in Cassidy's suit.
24 July; 13:54	7 hours 12 minutes	21:06	STS-127; ISS Quest	(United States) Christopher Cassidy (United States) Thomas Marshburn	P6 battery replacement (final 4 of 6).
27 July; 11:33	4 hours 54 minutes	16:27	STS-127; ISS Quest	(United States) Christopher Cassidy (United States) Thomas Marshburn	SPDM thermal cover adjustment, Z1 patch panel reconfiguration, JEM visual equipment (JEM-VE) installation (forward and aft), and JEM-LTA reconfigurations. S3 Nadir PAS (outboard) deployment postponed to later mission.
1 September; 21:49	6 hours 35 minutes	2 September; 04:24	STS-128; ISS Quest	(United States) John D. Olivas (United States) Nicole P. Stott	Prepared for the replacement of an empty ammonia tank on the station's port truss by releasing its bolts. Retrieved the MISSE-6 and EuTEF experiments mounted outside Columbus, and stowed them in the Shuttle's payload bay for their return to Earth. Nicole Stott becomes the tenth woman to conduct a spacewalk.
3 September; 22:13	6 hours 39 minutes	4 September; 04:51	STS-128; ISS Quest	(United States) John D. Olivas (Sweden) Christer Fuglesang	Removed the new ammonia tank from the shuttle's payload bay and replaced it with the used tank from the station. The new tank, weighing about 1,800 pounds (820 kg), was the most mass ever moved by spacewalking astronauts. With this spacewalk, Christer Fuglesang became the first person, who is not from either an American or Russian space program, to have participated in four or more spacewalks.
5 September; 20:39	7 hours 1 minute	6 September; 03:40	STS-128; ISS Quest	(United States) John D. Olivas (Sweden) Christer Fuglesang	Prepared for the arrival of Tranquility by attaching cables between the starboard truss and Unity, the area where Tranquility will be installed. The spacewalkers also replaced a communications sensor device, installed two new GPS antennas, deployed the PAS on the S3 truss, and replaced a circuit breaker.
19 November; 14:24	6 hours 37 minutes	21:01	STS-129; ISS Quest	(United States) Michael Foreman (United States) Robert Satcher	Installed a spare antenna on the station's truss and a bracket for ammonia lines on Unity. Lubricated the grapple mechanism on the Payload Orbital Replacement Unit Attachment Device on the Mobile Base System and lubricated the snares of the hand of the station's Japanese robotic arm. Deployed the S3 outboard Payload Attach System.
21 November; 14:31	6 hours 8 minutes	20:39	STS-129; ISS Quest	(United States) Michael Foreman (United States) Randolph Bresnik	Installed the GATOR (Grappling Adaptor to On-Orbit Railing) bracket to Columbus and an additional ham radio antenna. Installed on the truss an antenna for wireless helmet camera video. Relocated the Floating Potential Measurement Unit that records electrical potential around the station as it orbits the Earth. Deployed two brackets to attach cargo on the truss.
23 November; 13:24	5 hours 42 minutes	19:06	STS-129; ISS Quest	(United States) Robert Satcher (United States) Randolph Bresnik	Installed a new High Pressure Gas Tank (HPGT) on the Quest airlock. Installed MISSE-7A and 7B on ELC-2. Strapped two micrometeoroid and orbital debris (MMOD) shields to External Stowage Platform #2. Relocated foot restraint, released a bolt on Ammonia Tank Assembly, installed insulated covers on cameras on mobile servicing system and Canadarm 2's end effector. Worked heater cables on docking adapter.

== Orbital launch statistics ==
=== By country ===
For the purposes of this section, the yearly tally of orbital launches by country assigns each flight to the country of origin of the rocket, not to the launch services provider or the spaceport.

Country	Launches	Successes	Failures	Partial failures
China	6	5	0	1
France	7	7	0	0
India	2	2	0	0
Iran	1	1 (Note: First successful orbital launch)	0	0
Japan	3	3	0	0
North Korea	1	0	1	0
Russia	27	26	1	0
South Korea	1 (Note: With Russian assistance)	0	1	0
Ukraine	6	6	0	0
United States	24	23	1	0
World	78	73	4	1

=== By rocket ===
- Ariane 5
- Atlas V
- Delta II
- Delta IV
- Delta IV Heavy
- H-IIA
- H-IIB
- Long March 2
- Long March 3
- Long March 4
- Minotaur I
- Taurus
- PSLV
- Soyuz-U
- Soyuz-FG
- Soyuz-2
- Dnepr
- Tsyklon-3
- Space Shuttle
- Proton-K
- Proton-M
- Rokot
- Zenit-3SL/SLB
- Others

==== By family ====
Family	Country	Launches	Successes	Failures	Partial failures	Remarks
Angara	Russia	1	0	1	0	Maiden flight
Ariane	France	7	7	0	0	
Atlas	United States	5	5	0	0	
Delta	United States	11	11	0	0	
Falcon	United States	1	1	0	0	
H-II	Japan	3	3	0	0	
Long March	China	6	5	0	1	
Minotaur	United States	2	1	1	0	
PSLV	India	2	2	0	0	
R-7	Russia	13	12	1	0	
R-14	Russia	1	1	0	0	
R-36	Ukraine	2	2	0	0	
Safir	Iran	1	1	0	0	First successful launch
Space Shuttle	United States	5	5	0	0	
Unha	North Korea	1	0	1	0	
Universal Rocket	Russia	13	13	0	0	
Zenit	Ukraine	4	4	0	0	

==== By type ====
Rocket	Country	Family	Launches	Successes	Failures	Partial failures	Remarks
Ariane 5	France	Ariane	7	7	0	0	
Atlas V	United States	Atlas	5	5	0	0	
Delta II	United States	Delta	8	8	0	0	
Delta IV	United States	Delta	3	3	0	0	
Dnepr	Ukraine	R-36	1	1	0	0	
Falcon 1	United States	Falcon	1	1	0	0	Final flight
H-IIA	Japan	H-II	2	2	0	0	
H-IIB	Japan	H-II	1	1	0	0	Maiden flight
Kosmos	Russia	R-12/R-14	1	1	0	0	
Long March 2	China	Long March	3	3	0	0	
Long March 3	China	Long March	2	1	0	1	
Long March 4	China	Long March	1	1	0	0	
Minotaur I	United States	Minotaur	1	1	0	0	
Naro	Russia; South Korea	Angara	1	0	1	0	Maiden flight
Proton	Russia	Universal Rocket	10	10	0	0	
PSLV	India	PSLV	2	2	0	0	
Safir	Iran	Safir	1	1	0	0	
Soyuz	Russia	R-7	11	11	0	0	
Soyuz-2	Russia	R-7	2	1	1	0	
Space Shuttle	United States	Space Shuttle	5	5	0	0	
Taurus	United States	Minotaur	1	0	1	0	
Tsyklon	Ukraine	R-36	1	1	0	0	Final flight
Unha	North Korea	Unha	1	0	1	0	
UR-100	Russia	Universal Rocket	3	3	0	0	
Zenit	Ukraine	Zenit	4	4	0	0	

==== By configuration ====
Rocket	Country	Type	Launches	Successes	Failures	Partial failures	Remarks
Ariane 5 ECA	France	Ariane 5	6	6	0	0	
Ariane 5 GS	France	Ariane 5	1	1	0	0	Final flight
Atlas V 401	United States	Atlas V	3	3	0	0	
Atlas V 421	United States	Atlas V	1	1	0	0	
Atlas V 431	United States	Atlas V	1	1	0	0	
Delta II 7320	United States	Delta II	2	2	0	0	
Delta II 7920	United States	Delta II	3	3	0	0	
Delta II 7925	United States	Delta II	3	3	0	0	Final flight
Delta IV-M+ (4,2)	United States	Delta IV	1	1	0	0	
Delta IV-M+ (5,4)	United States	Delta IV	1	1	0	0	Maiden flight
Delta IV Heavy	United States	Delta IV	1	1	0	0	
Dnepr	Ukraine	Dnepr	1	1	0	0	
Falcon 1	United States	Falcon	1	1	0	0	
H-IIA 202	Japan	H-IIA	2	2	0	0	
H-IIB	Japan	H-IIB	1	1	0	0	Maiden flight
Kosmos-3M	Russia	Kosmos	1	1	0	0	
Long March 2C	China	Long March 2	2	2	0	0	
Long March 2D	China	Long March 2	1	1	0	0	
Long March 3B	China	Long March 3	1	0	0	1	
Long March 3C	China	Long March 3	1	1	0	0	
Long March 4C	China	Long March 3	1	1	0	0	
Minotaur I	United States	Minotaur I	1	1	0	0	
Naro-1	Russia; South Korea	Naro	1	0	1	0	Maiden flight
Proton-K / DM-2	Russia	Proton	1	1	0	0	
Proton-M / DM-2	Russia	Proton	1	1	0	0	
Proton-M / Briz-M	Russia	Proton	8	8	0	0	
PSLV-CA	India	PSLV	2	2	0	0	
Rokot / Briz-KM	Russia	UR-100	3	3	0	0	
Safir	Iran	Safir	1	1	0	0	
Soyuz-2.1a / Fregat	Russia	Soyuz-2	1	0	1	0	
Soyuz-2.1b / Fregat	Russia	Soyuz-2	1	1	0	0	
Soyuz-FG	Russia	Soyuz	4	4	0	0	
Soyuz-U	Russia	Soyuz	7	7	0	0	
Space Shuttle	United States	Space Shuttle	5	5	0	0	
Taurus-XL 3110	United States	Taurus	1	0	1	0	
Tsyklon-3	Ukraine	Tsyklon	1	1	0	0	Final flight
Unha	North Korea	Unha	1	0	1	0	
Zenit-3SL	Ukraine	Zenit	1	1	0	0	
Zenit-3SLB	Ukraine	Zenit	3	3	0	0	

=== By launch site ===
- Jiuquan
- Taiyuan
- Xichang
- Kourou
- Satish Dhawan
- Ocean Odyssey
- Semnan
- Tanegashima
- Baikonur
- Kwajalein
- Tonghae
- Plesetsk
- Naro
- Cape Canaveral
- Kennedy
- MARS
- Vandenberg

Site	Country	Launches	Successes	Failures	Partial failures	Remarks
Baikonur	Kazakhstan	24	24	0	0	
Cape Canaveral	United States	11	11	0	0	
Jiuquan	China	2	2	0	0	
Kennedy	United States	5	5	0	0	
Kwajalein	Marshall Islands	1	1	0	0	
Kourou	France	7	7	0	0	
MARS	United States	1	1	0	0	
Ocean Odyssey	(United Nations) International	1	1	0	0	
Naro	South Korea	1	0	1	0	First launch
Plesetsk	Russia	8	7	1	0	
Satish Dhawan	India	2	2	0	0	
Semnan	Iran	1	1	0	0	
Taiyuan	China	2	2	0	0	
Tanegashima	Japan	3	3	0	0	
Tonghae	North Korea	1	0	1	0	
Vandenberg	United States	6	5	1	0	
Xichang	China	2	1	0	1	
Total		78	73	4	1	

=== By orbit ===
- Transatmospheric
- Low Earth
- Low Earth (ISS)
- Low Earth (SSO)
- Low Earth (retrograde)
- Medium Earth
- Geosychronous
  (transfer)
- Inclined GSO
- High Earth
- Heliocentric

Orbital regime	Launches	Successes	Failures	Accidentally achieved	Remarks
Transatmospheric	0	0	0	0	
Low Earth	45	42	3	0	14 to ISS
Medium Earth / Molniya	4	3	1	1	
Geosynchronous / GTO	26	26	0	0	
High Earth / Lunar transfer	1	1	0	0	
Heliocentric / Planetary transfer	2	2	0	0	
Total	78	74	4	1	

== See also ==
- List of human spaceflights
- Suborbital spaceflight in 2009
- Timeline of spaceflight
