= Universitetsky-Tatyana-2 =

Research & Educational Satellite

- Mission type: Technology demonstration; Education
- Operator: MGU
- COSPAR ID: 2009-049D
- SATCAT no.: 35868
- Mission duration: 3 months, 30 days

Spacecraft properties
- Launch mass: 98 kg (216 lb)

Start of mission
- Launch date: 17 September 2009, 15:55:07 UTC
- Rocket: Soyuz-2-1b/Fregat
- Launch site: Baikonur Site 31/6

End of mission
- Last contact: 16 January 2010

Orbital parameters
- Reference system: Geocentric
- Regime: Low Earth
- Perigee altitude: 820 kilometres (510 mi)
- Apogee altitude: 827 kilometres (514 mi)
- Inclination: 98.54 degrees
- Period: 101.22 minutes
- Epoch: 6 July 2014, 02:36:45 UTC

Universitetsky-Tatyana-2 was a small research and educational satellite mainly developed by Taiwan (National Cheng Kung University and National Central University) and Russia Moscow State University and launched on 17 September 2009 from Baikonur Cosmodrome on a Soyuz-2.1b rocket. This satellite was equally sponsored by Taiwan and Russia. Along with teamwork supported by Mexico and South Korea, the two Taiwanese institutions particularly contributed satellite computing systems, flight programmes as well as thermotic, magnetic, and digital data processing devices.

== Mission objectives ==
The satellite was part of an international research and educational youth program of near-Earth space exploration. The mission's objectives were:

- Investigating light phenomena in the Earth's atmosphere due to the effect of galaxy cosmic rays and high-energy charged particles;
- Investigating en-route radiation conditions;
- Investigating variations of the Earth's gravitational and magnetic fields.

Over the course of its mission, Universitetsky-Tatyana-2 detected over 1000 flashes in the Earth's atmosphere.

== End of mission ==
The Universitetsky-Tatyana-2 spacecraft ended operations on 16 January 2010 due to a failure in the attitude control system.

== See also ==
- 2009 in spaceflight
