= Gill (lunar crater) =

Impact crater on the Moon

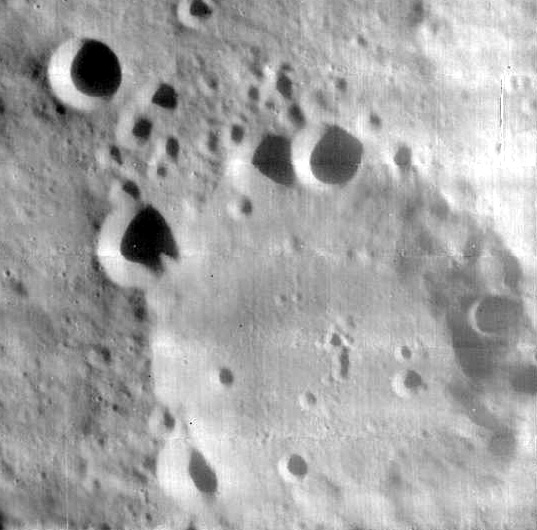
- Lunar Orbiter 4 image
- Coordinates: 63.9°S 75.9°E
- Diameter: 66 km
- Depth: 3.73 km (2.32 mi)
- Colongitude: 286° at sunrise
- Eponym: David Gill

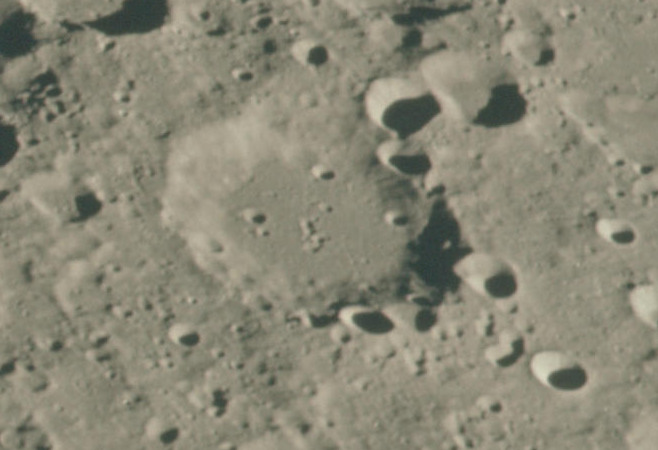
Oblique view of Gill from Apollo 15, facing southwest

Gill is a lunar impact crater that is located near the southeastern limb of the Moon. Due to its proximity to the edge of the Moon as seen from the Earth, this crater is viewed nearly from the side and it can become hidden from sight due to libration. The crater lies to the southwest of the irregular Mare Australe, and southeast of the prominent crater Pontécoulant. To the southwest of Gill is the crater Helmholtz.

This is an old, eroded crater formation with an outer rim that is uneven from a history of impacts. A joined pair of small craters lie along the northern rim, and Gill A intrudes slightly into the western outer rim. The interior floor is relatively level, and is marked by several craterlets.

On June 11, 2009, the Japanese SELENE lunar orbiter spacecraft was deliberately crashed into the surface of the Moon to the southeast of Gill. The impact site was at selenographic coordinates 65.5 S, 80.4 E. The flash from the impact was successfully observed from Mount Abu Observatory in Guru Shikhar, India. and by the Anglo-Australian Telescope.

This crater is named after British astronomer David Gill (1843–1914).

== Satellite craters ==
By convention these features are identified on lunar maps by placing the letter on the side of the crater midpoint that is closest to Gill.

Gill	Latitude	Longitude	Diameter (km)	Diameter (mi)
A	63.6° S	72.9° E	13 km	8 mi
B	61.7° S	69.9° E	31 km	19 mi
C	62.2° S	67.4° E	30 km	19 mi
D	63.4° S	79.8° E	15 km	9 mi
E	63.3° S	70.4° E	13 km	8 mi
F	63.8° S	65.1° E	23 km	14 mi
G	63.5° S	68.2° E	32 km	20 mi
H	63.9° S	70.2° E	8 km	5 mi
