= USA-207 =

American communications satellite

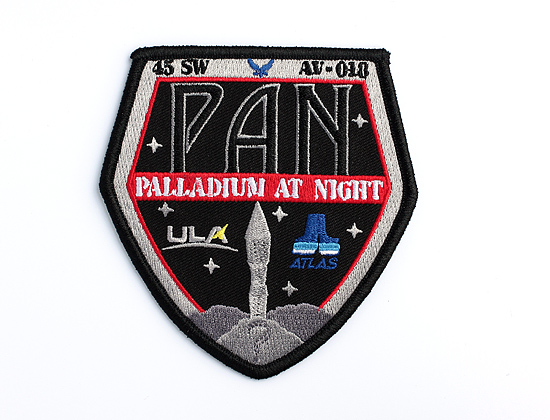
- PAN mission patch
- Mission type: SIGINT
- COSPAR ID: 2009-047A
- SATCAT no.: 35815

Spacecraft properties
- Bus: A2100
- Manufacturer: Lockheed Martin

Start of mission
- Launch date: 8 September 2009, 21:35:00 UTC
- Rocket: Atlas V 401
- Launch site: Cape Canaveral SLC-41
- Contractor: ULA

Orbital parameters
- Reference system: Geocentric
- Regime: Geostationary
- Perigee altitude: 35,778 kilometers (22,231 mi)
- Apogee altitude: 35,807 kilometers (22,249 mi)
- Inclination: 0.09 degrees
- Period: 1436.12 minutes
- Epoch: 10 January 2015, 14:22:18 UTC

USA-207, international COSPAR code 2009-047A, also known as PAN, officially meaning Palladium at Night, NEMESIS I, or P360 is a classified American SIGINT satellite, which was launched in September 2009. The US government has not confirmed which of its intelligence agencies operate the satellite, but leaked documents from the Snowden files point to the NSA. The spacecraft was constructed by Lockheed Martin, and is based on the A2100 satellite bus, using commercial off-the-shelf components. The contract to build PAN was awarded in October 2006, with the satellite initially scheduled to launch 30 months later, in March 2009.

PAN was launched by United Launch Alliance using an Atlas V 401 carrier rocket, with the serial number AV-018. The launch, from Space Launch Complex 41 at the Cape Canaveral Air Force Station, occurred at 21:35 GMT on 8 September 2009, at the start of a 129-minute launch window. PAN successfully separated from the rocket just under two hours after liftoff.

PAN has shown an unusual history of frequent relocations during the first 5 years of its operations, moving between at least 9 different orbital slots since launch. With each move, it was placed close to another commercial communications satellite. From 2013 onwards it was located at 47.7 deg E., over East Africa, staying in that position for several years. In February 2021 it started a slow drift eastwards.

== Gallery ==
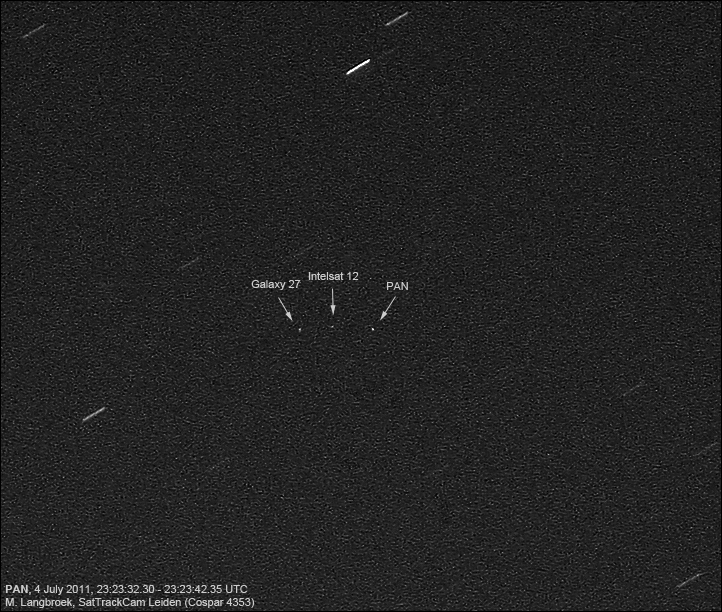
The geostationary satellite PAN (2009-047A), along with two other (commercial) geostationary satellites photographed on 4 July 2011 (photo: Marco Langbroek, Leiden, the Netherlands)
