= SELENE =

Japanese lunar orbiter spacecraft

Kaguya
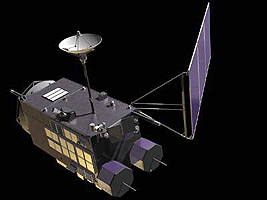
- Mission type: Lunar orbiter
- Operator: JAXA
- COSPAR ID: 2007-039A
- SATCAT no.: 32054
- Mission duration: 1 year and 9 months (launch date to decay date)

Spacecraft properties
- Manufacturer: NEC Toshiba Space Systems
- Launch mass: Total: 3,020 kilograms (6,660 lb) * Main orbiter (Kaguya): 2,914 kilograms (6,424 lb) * Relay Satellite (Okina): 53 kilograms (117 lb) * VLBI Satellite (Ouna): 53 kilograms (117 lb)
- Power: 3,486 watts

Start of mission
- Launch date: September 14, 2007, 01:31:01 UTC
- Rocket: H-IIA 2022 F13
- Launch site: Tanegashima Yoshinobu 1
- Contractor: Mitsubishi

End of mission
- Disposal: Deorbited (Moon impact)
- Decay date: June 10, 2009, 18:25 UTC

Orbital parameters
- Reference system: Selenocentric
- Periselene altitude: 281 kilometres (175 mi)
- Aposelene altitude: 231,910 kilometres (144,100 mi)
- Inclination: 29.9 degrees
- Period: 7109.28 seconds
- Epoch: September 29, 2007

Lunar orbiter
- Orbital insertion: October 3, 2007
- Impact site: 65.50°S 80.4°E

Instruments
- X-ray Spectrometer (XRS); Gamma-ray spectrometer (GRS); Multi-band Imager (MI); Spectral Profiler (SP); Terrain Camera (TC); Lunar Radar Sounder (LRS); Laser Altimeter (LALT); Lunar Magnetometer (LMAG); Charged Particle Spectrometer (CPS); Plasma energy Angle and Composition Experiment (PACE); Radio Science (RS); Upper-atmosphere and Plasma Imager (UPI); Relay Satellite aboard Okina (RSAT); VLBI Radio source aboard Okina and Ouna (VRAD); High Definition Television cameras (HDTV)

SELENE (/ˈsɛlɪniː/; Selenological and Engineering Explorer), better known in Japan by its nickname Kaguya (かぐや), was the second Japanese lunar orbiter spacecraft following the Hiten probe. Produced by the Institute of Space and Astronautical Science (ISAS) and the National Space Development Agency (NASDA), the spacecraft was launched on September 14, 2007. After orbiting the Moon for a year and eight months, the main orbiter was instructed to impact on the lunar surface near the crater Gill on June 10, 2009.

== Nickname ==
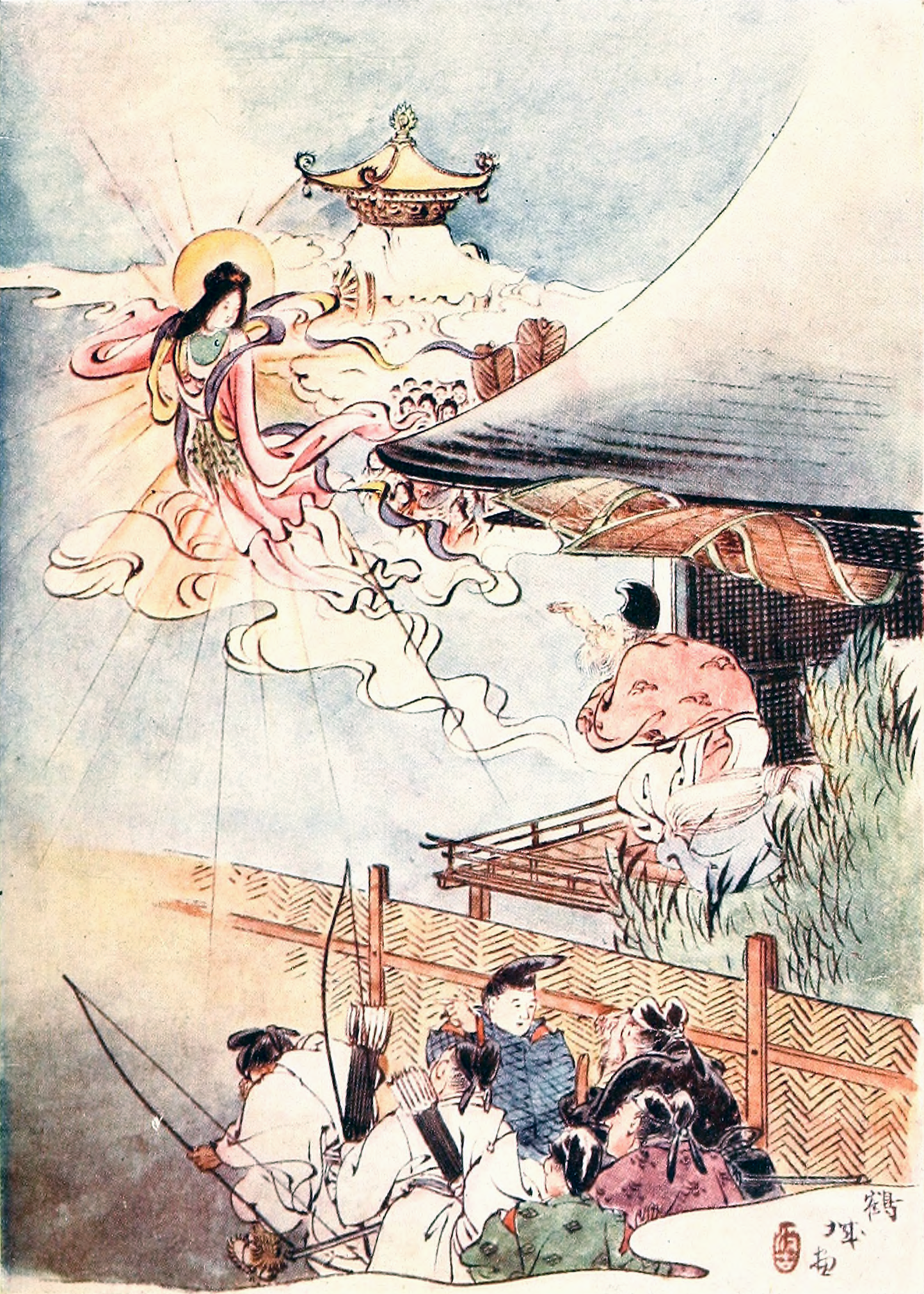
"The Receding Princess" from The Japanese Fairy Book, 1908

The orbiter's nickname, Kaguya, was selected by the general public. It comes from the name of a lunar princess in the ancient Japanese folktale The Tale of the Bamboo Cutter. After their successful release, its sub-satellites, Rstar and Vstar, were named Okina and Ouna, also derived from characters in the tale.

== Mission objectives ==
The main scientific objectives of the mission were to:

- Study the origins of the Moon and its geologic evolution
- Obtain information about the lunar surface environment

== Launch ==
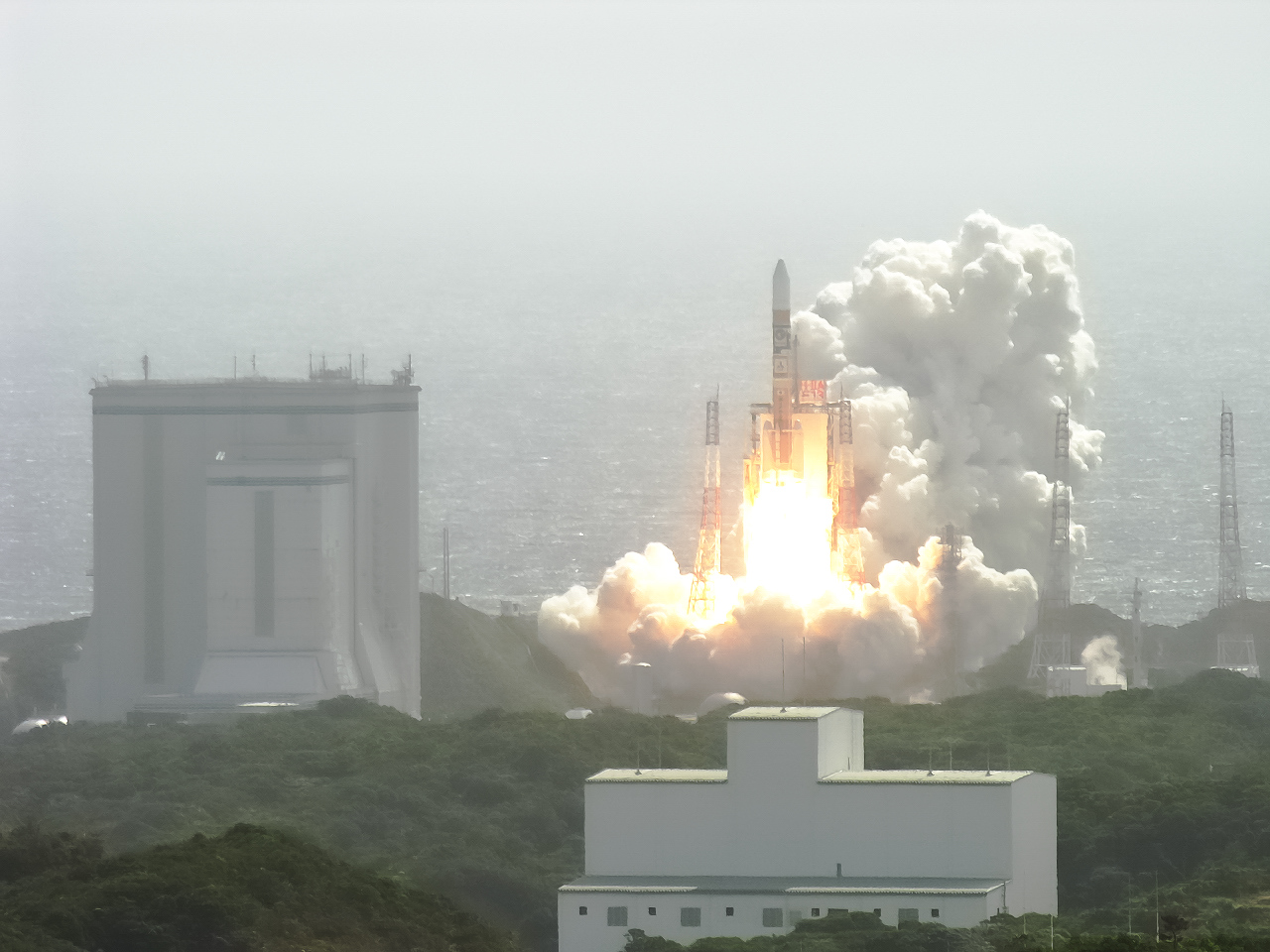
Launch of H-IIA F13 carrying SELENE (Photo by Narita Masahiro)

SELENE launched on September 14, 2007, at 01:31:01 UTC on an H-IIA (Model H2A2022) carrier rocket from Tanegashima Space Center into a 281.55-kilometre (174.95 mi) (perigee) / 232,960-kilometre (144,750 mi) (apogee) geocentric parking orbit. The total launch mass was 3,020 kilograms (6,660 lb).

The SELENE mission was originally scheduled to launch in 2003, but rocket failures on another mission and technical difficulties delayed the launch until 2007. Launch was planned for August 16, 2007, but was postponed when some electronic components were found to be installed incorrectly.

== Lunar operations ==
On October 3, it entered an initial 101-to-11,741-kilometre (63 to 7,296 mi) polar lunar orbit. On October 9, the relay satellite was released into a 100-to-2,400-kilometre (62 to 1,491 mi) orbit, while on October 12 the VLBI satellite was released into a 100-to-800-kilometre (62 to 497 mi) one. Finally, by October 19, the orbiter was in a circular 100-kilometre (62 mi) orbit. The nominal mission duration was one year plus possible extensions.

On October 31, 2007, Kaguya deployed its Lunar Magnetometer, Lunar Radar Sounder, Earth-looking Upper Atmosphere and Plasma Imager. On December 21, 2007, Kaguya began regular operations after all fifteen observation experiments had been satisfactorily verified.

Kaguya completed the planned operation by the end of October 2008 and began extended operations planned to continue through March 2009. It would then be sent into a circular 50-kilometre (31 mi) orbit, and finally to an elliptical 20-to-100-kilometre (12 to 62 mi) one, with a controlled impact occurring by August 2009. Because of a degraded reaction wheel, the plan was changed so that on February 1, 2009, the orbit was lowered to 50 kilometres (31 mi) ± 20 kilometres (12 mi), and impact with lunar surface occurred at 18:25 UTC on June 10, 2009.

== Design ==
The mission featured three separate spacecraft:

=== Main orbiter ===
- Shape: octagonal prism
- Mass: 2,914 kilograms (6,424 lb)
- Size: 2.1 x 2.1 x 4.8 m (6.9 x 6.9 x 16 ft)
- Attitude control: Three-axis stabilized
- Power: 3.5 kW (Max.)
- Mission period: 1 year
- Mission orbit: Circular, 100-kilometre (62 mi)
- Inclination: 90 degrees

=== Okina (small relay satellite) ===
Okina (formerly Rstar) and Ouna (formerly Vstar) were octagonal prisms to support radio science. Okina relayed radio communications between the orbiter and the Earth when the orbiter was behind the Moon. This allowed, for the first time, the direct Doppler shift measurements needed to precisely map the gravitational field of the lunar farside; previously, the farside gravity field could only be inferred by nearside measurements. The relay satellite impacted the lunar farside near the Mineur D crater at 19:46 JST (10:46 UTC) on February 12, 2009.

- Function: two-way radio science relay, orbiter-earth
- Mass: 53 kilograms (117 lb)
- Size: 1.0 x 1.0 x 0.65 m (3.3 x 3.3 x 2.1 ft)
- Attitude control: spin-stabilized
- Power: 70 W
- Initial orbit: 100 to 2,400 kilometres (62 to 1,491 mi)
- Inclination: 90 degrees

=== Ouna (VLBI satellite) ===
Ouna used Very Long Baseline Interferometry as a second way to map the Moon's gravity field. It was especially useful at the lunar limb, where the gravitational acceleration is perpendicular to the line of sight to Earth, making Doppler measurements unsuitable.

- Function: VLBI radio science
- Mass: 53 kilograms (117 lb)
- Size: 1.0 x 1.0 x 0.65 m (3.3 x 3.3 x 2.1 ft)
- Attitude control: spin-stabilized
- Power: 70 W
- Initial orbit: 100 to 800 kilometres (62 to 497 mi)
- Inclination: 90 degrees

== Instruments ==
First optical still captured by the onboard HDTV camera. Earth is seen at a distance of 11,000 km.

SELENE carried 13 scientific instruments "to obtain scientific data of the lunar origin and evolution and to develop the technology for the future lunar exploration":

- Terrain camera (TC) (resolution 10 meters [33 ft] per pixel)
- X-ray fluorescence spectrometer (XRS)
- Lunar magnetometer (LMAG)
- Spectral profiler (SP) (resolution per pixel: 562 x 400 m [1840 x 1310 ft])
- Multi-band imager (MI) (resolution of visible light 20 [66 ft] meters per pixel, near-infrared 62 meters [200 ft] per pixel)
- Laser altimeter (LALT)
- Lunar radar sounder (LRS)
- Gamma ray spectrometer (GRS)
- Charged particle spectrometer (CPS)
- Plasma analyzer (PACE)
- Upper atmosphere and plasma imager (UPI)
- Radio wave repeater (RSAT) aboard Okina
- Radio wave source for VLBI (VRAD) aboard Okina and Ouna

Two 2.2 megapixel CCD HDTV cameras, one wide-angle and one telephoto, were also on board, primarily for public outreach. The HDTV system, developed by NHK (Japan Broadcasting Corporation), produced over 1.3 TB of video and stills over 19 months.

JAXA collected names and messages that were carried on SELENE through their "Wish Upon the Moon" campaign. 412,627 names and messages were printed on a sheet measuring 280 mm x 160 mm (11 x 6.3 in) at 70 μm (0.0003 in) per character. The sheet was installed under the photovoltaic modules and cooling panels beneath the multi-layered insulation.

== Results ==
Major results include:

- Improved lunar global topography maps. This detailed altitude and geological data was provided to Google for free to make Google Moon 3-D.
- Detailed gravity map of the far side of the Moon.
- First optical observation of the permanently shadowed interior of the crater Shackleton at the lunar south pole.
- Evidence of Earth's oxygen being transported to the Moon via magnetospheric ions.

== Other lunar probes ==
SELENE was part of a renewed global interest in lunar exploration; it was "the largest lunar mission since the Apollo program". It followed Japan's first lunar probe, Hagoromo, launched in 1990. China launched its Chang'e 1 lunar explorer on October 24, 2007, followed by India's October 22, 2008 launch of Chandrayaan-1 and the United States Lunar Reconnaissance Orbiter in June 2009. The United States, European countries (ESA), Russia, Japan, India and China are planning future crewed lunar exploration missions or lunar outpost construction on the Moon between 2018 and 2025.

== See also ==
- SELENE-2
- List of missions to the Moon
- Exploration of the Moon
