= Sejjil =

Iranian Intermediate Range Ballistic Missile

Sejil
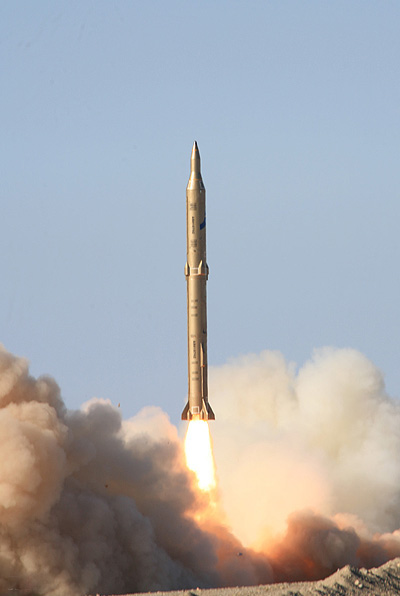
- Type: Intermediate-range ballistic missile
- Place of origin: Iran

Service history
- In service: Not disclosed
- Used by: Iran

Production history
- Manufacturer: Iran

Specifications
- Mass: 22.5 tonnes
- Length: 18.2 m
- Diameter: 1.25 m
- Warhead weight: 500–1,500 kg
- Propellant: Solid fuel
- Operational range: 2,000 (but see text)
- Accuracy: to 50m
- Launch platform: Mobile launcher

Sejil, or Sejjil, (Persian: سجیل, lit. 'brimstone') is an Iranian two-staged solid-fueled intermediate-range ballistic missile. The Sejil is a replacement for Iran's Shahab liquid-fueled ballistic missiles.

Multiple sources report that the Sejjil is a rename of Iran's Ashura missile. As of 2026, the Sejjil is one of Iran's three longest-range missiles, along with the Shahab-3 and Emad missiles.

== Nomenclature ==
Sejjil (Persian: سجیل literally translates as 'baked clay.' The missile is also referred to by the alternative name "Sejjil-2," which has been used since 2009. In 2009, Iranian defense minister Mostafa Mohammad-Najjar claimed that the Sejjil-2 differed in guidance systems and sensors. There are no discernible differences between the two, and the Iranian press appears to use the names "Sejjil" and "Sejjil-2" interchangeably, according to Foundation for Defense of Democracies in 2023.

== Design ==
The Sejil is a two-stage, solid-propellant, surface-to-surface missile (SSM) produced by Iran with a reported 2,000 km (1,200 mi) range. Institute for the Study of War and Defense Intelligence Agency report a 2,000 km range, but Iran Watch reports a range of up to 2,500 km.

According to Jane's Information Group, details of the design other than the number of stages and that it uses solid fuel have not been released. Uzi Rubin, former director of Israel's Ballistic Missile Defense Organization, indicated that, "Unlike other Iranian missiles, the Sajil bears no resemblance to any North Korean, Russian, Chinese or Pakistani (missile technology). It demonstrates a significant leap in Iran's missile capabilities." Rubin went on to state that the Sejil " ... places Iran in the realm of multiple-stage missiles, which means that they are on the way to having intercontinental ballistic missile (ICBM) capabilities ..." The CEP is unknown.

The missile utilizes composite solid fuel and unlike the Shahab-3 medium-range ballistic missile (MRBM), which is launched only vertically, the Sejil could be launched at a variable angle. As a weapon, Sejil presents much more challenge to Iran's potential enemies, as solid-fuel missiles can be launched with much less notice than liquid-fueled missiles, making them more difficult to strike prior to launch.

Iran claims that if launched from the city of Natanz, it could reach Tel Aviv in less than seven minutes.

== Variants ==
- Sejil-2: According to CSIS Missile Threat, it is unclear if there is an independent Sejil-2 variant, or whether the name is simply a reference by Iran to testing in 2009 of the original Sejil.
- Sejil-3: According to CSIS Missile Threat, unconfirmed reports about the development of a Sejil-3 state that it would reportedly have three stages, a maximum range of 4,000 km, and a launch weight of 38,000 kg.
Sejil-2 missile images

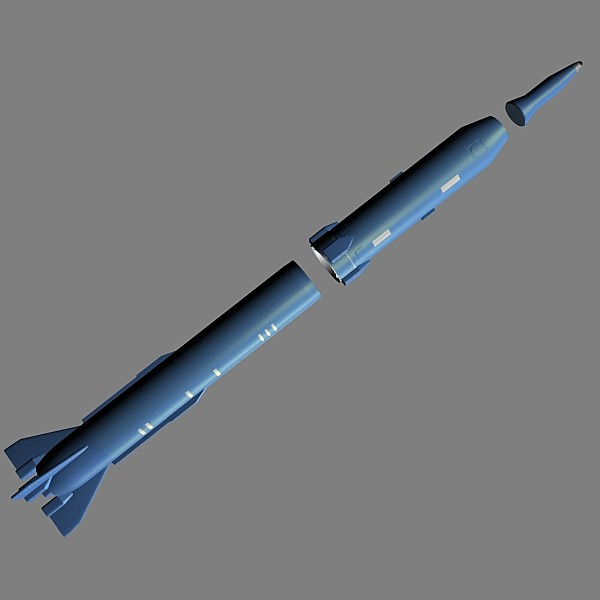
Artist's impression

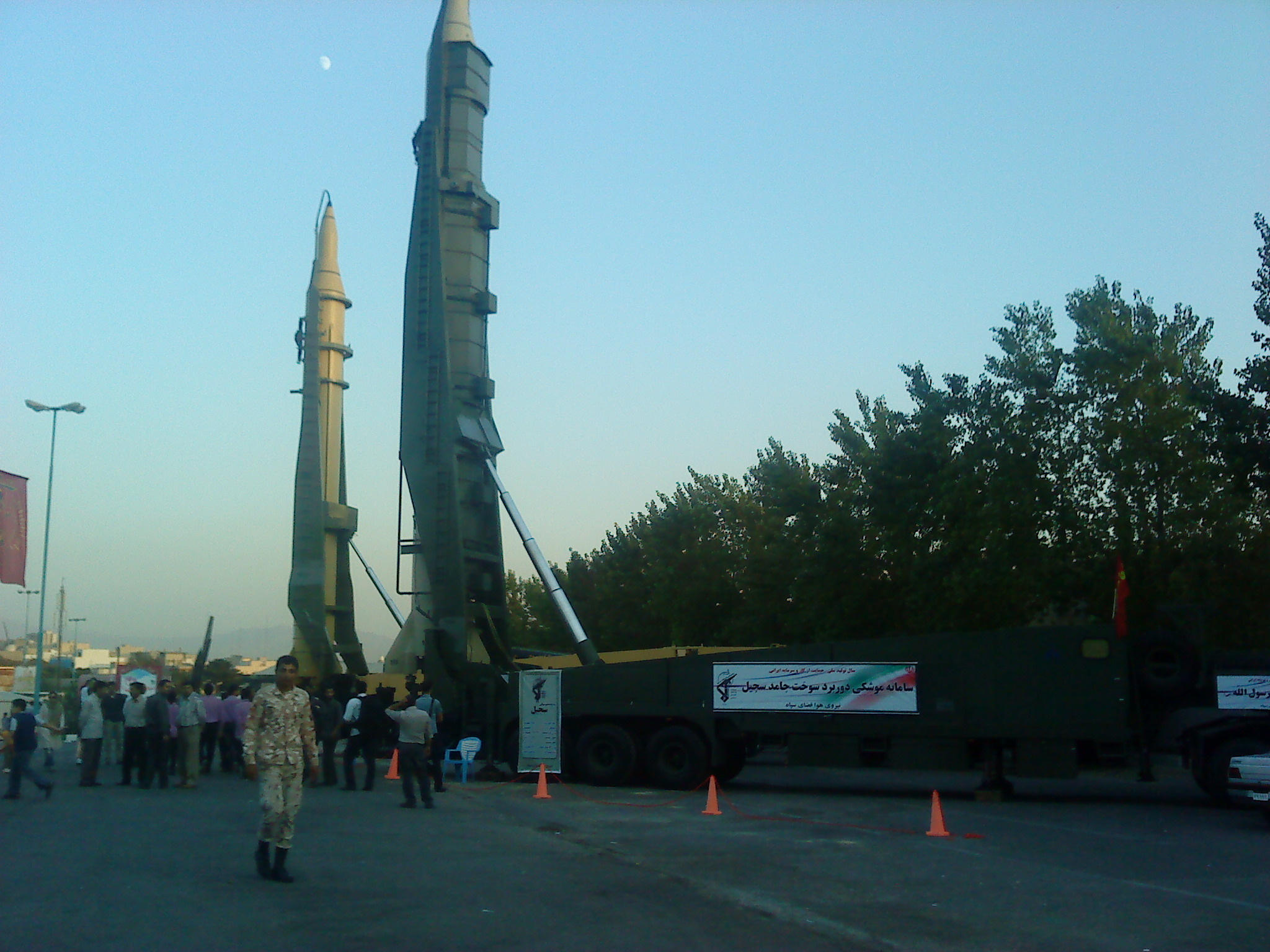
Sejil (right) and Qiam (left) missile

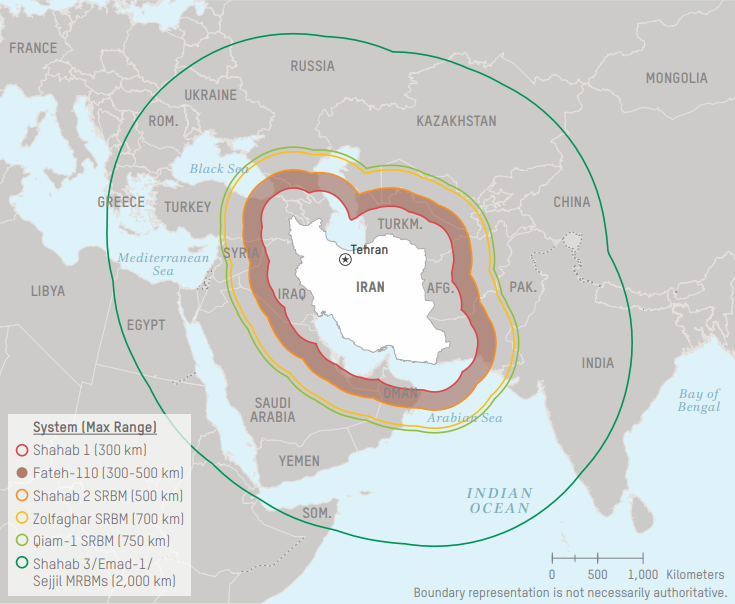
Map of range of Sejil missiles and other missiles

== Operational history ==
Under its prior name of Ashura, the missile underwent an unsuccessful test in November 2007, where the second statge failed to deploy. A successful test launch took place on 13 November 2008. Its range, if confirmed, would allow it to strike targets as far away as Israel and southeastern Europe. A Sejjil-2 missile underwent a successful test on 20 May 2009. An Obama administration official, Gary Samore, described the 20 May test as "a significant technical development." There were several later tests. In December 2009, Iran reported that they had test fired an upgraded Sejjil version with a shorter launch time. There were no reported tests between 2012 and 2020, and in 2014 the Sejjil was described as "not deployed" by Center for Strategic and International Studies, an American think tank.

The decade-long hiatus in testing was broken in January 2021, when three Sejjil missiles were shown in Iranian's Great Prophet XV military drills and two or more were launched. The cause of the significant delay in testing is unknown. The missile was tested again in December 2021.

On 25 March 2025, Iran showed Sejjil missiles in a new underground missile base, alongside Kheibar Shekan, Emad, Haj Qassem, and Ghadr missiles. The location was undisclosed. On June 18, 2025, during the Twelve-Day War the IRGC claimed to have fired a Sejjil missile at Israel; Israel claims the missile was intercepted with fragments causing minor damage to a vehicle. Analysts said this may have reflected a need to use longer-range missiles from deeper within Iranian territory. Iran may have tested a Sejjil missile at Semnan Space Center on 18 September 2025, but other missiles cannot be ruled out. In March 2026, Iran claimed to have launched a Sejjil missile at Israel.

== See also ==
- Ballistic missile program of Iran
- Military of Iran
- Iranian military industry
- List of military equipment manufactured in Iran
- Iran's missile forces
- Fateh-110
- Equipment of the Iranian Army
- Science and technology in Iran
- Twelve-Day War
