= 2006 in spaceflight =

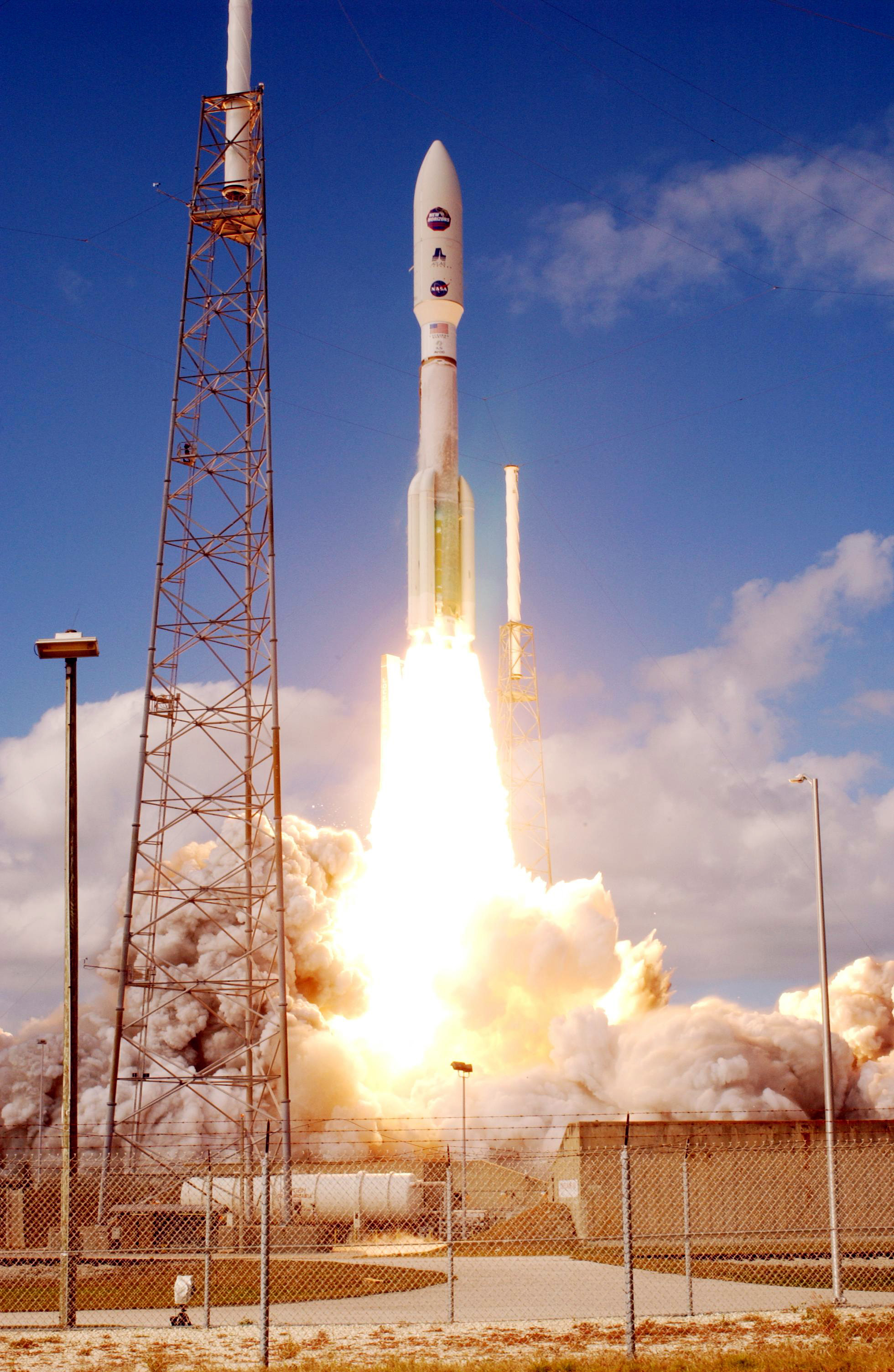
- Launch of New Horizons, the first probe to Pluto, on the first Atlas V 551

Orbital launches
- First: 19 January
- Last: 27 December
- Total: 67
- Successes: 62
- Failures: 5
- Partial failures: 0
- Catalogued: 63 (Note: ArabSat-4A was catalogued but re-entered after a few weeks in wrong orbit)

National firsts
- Satellite: Kazakhstan
- Space traveller: Brazil; Iran; Sweden

Rockets
- Maiden flights: Atlas V 411; Atlas V 551; Long March 4B-II (4C); Falcon 1 H-IIA 204; Soyuz-2.1b
- Retirements: Tsyklon-2; M-V

Crewed flights
- Orbital: 5
- Total travellers: 26

2006 in spaceflight

This article outlines notable events occurring in 2006 in spaceflight, including major launches and EVAs. 2006 saw Brazil, Iran, and Sweden all get a national into space for the first time.

== Launches ==
- ← Jan
- Feb
- Mar
- Apr
- May
- Jun
- Jul
- Aug
- Sep
- Oct
- Nov
- Dec →

| Date and time (UTC) | Rocket | Flight number | Launch site | | LSP | |
| Date and time (UTC) | Payload (⚀ = CubeSat) | Operator | Orbit | Function | Decay (UTC) | Outcome |
| Date and time (UTC) | Remarks | | | | | |
|---|---|---|---|---|---|---|
=== January ===
| 19 January; 19:00:00 | (United States) Atlas V 551 | | (United States) Cape Canaveral SLC-41 | | (Russia) (United States) International Launch Services | |
| 19 January; 19:00:00 | (United States) New Horizons | NASA | Galactocentric | Pluto flyby | In orbit | Operational |
| 19 January; 19:00:00 | Maiden flight of Atlas V 551, first spacecraft to visit Pluto and explored the Kuiper belt. First spacecraft launched directly to Sun-escape velocity | | | | | |
| 24 January; 01:33 | (Japan) H-IIA 2022 | | (Japan) Tanegashima LA-Y1 | | (Japan) JAXA | |
| 24 January; 01:33 | (Japan) Daichi (ALOS) | JAXA | Sun-synchronous | Remote Sensing | In orbit | Partial spacecraft failure Operational |
| 24 January; 01:33 | Poor quality images returned due to attitude control and noise problems was resolved by software adjustment. | | | | | |
=== February ===
| 15 February; 23:34:55 | (Ukraine) Zenit-3SL | | (Norway) Ocean Odyssey | | (United Nations) Sea Launch | |
| 15 February; 23:34:55 | (United States) EchoStar X | EchoStar | Geosynchronous | Communications | In orbit | Operational |
| 18 February; 06:27 | (Japan) H-IIA 2024 | | (Japan) Tanegashima LA-Y1 | | (Japan) RSC | |
| 18 February; 06:27 | (Japan) MTSAT-2 | MILT/JMA | Geosynchronous | ATC/Weather | In orbit | Operational |
| 18 February; 06:27 | Last launch conducted by RSC | | | | | |
| 21 February; 21:28:00 | (Japan) M-V | | (Japan) Uchinoura | | (Japan) JAXA | |
| 21 February; 21:28:00 | (Japan) Akari (ASTRO-F) | JAXA | Sun-synchronous | IR astronomy | 11 April 2023; 04:44 | Successful |
| 21 February; 21:28:00 | ⚀ (Japan) Cute-1.7+APD | TiTech | Low Earth | Amateur radio | 24 October 2009 | Successful |
| 21 February; 21:28:00 | Cute-1.7+APD is a 2U CubeSat | | | | | |
| 28 February; 20:10:00 | (Russia) Proton-M/Briz-M | | (Kazakhstan) Baikonur Site 200/39 | | (Russia) (United States) International Launch Services | |
| 28 February; 20:10:00 | (Saudi Arabia) Arabsat 4A | Arabsat | Intended: Geosynchronous; Achieved: Medium Earth | Communications | 24 March | Launch failure |
| 28 February; 20:10:00 | Upper stage malfunction left payload in useless orbit, deorbited after attempts to raise orbit failed | | | | | |
=== March ===
| 11 March; 22:33 | (France) Ariane 5ECA | | (France) Kourou ELA-3 | | (France) Arianespace | |
| 11 March; 22:33 | (Spain) Spainsat | Hisdesat | Geosynchronous | Communications | In orbit | Operational |
| 11 March; 22:33 | (France) Hot Bird 7A | Eutelsat | Geosynchronous | Communications | In orbit | Operational |
| 22 March; 14:03 | (United States) Pegasus-XL | | (United States) Stargazer, Vandenberg | | (United States) Orbital Sciences | |
| 22 March; 14:03 | (United States) ST-5A | NASA | Low Earth | Technology | In orbit | Successful |
| 22 March; 14:03 | (United States) ST-5B | NASA | Low Earth | Technology | In orbit | Successful |
| 22 March; 14:03 | (United States) ST-5C | NASA | Low Earth | Technology | In orbit | Successful |
| 22 March; 14:03 | All three satellites deactivated on 30 June | | | | | |
| 24 March; 22:30 | (United States) Falcon 1 | | (Marshall Islands) Omelek | | (United States) SpaceX | |
| 24 March; 22:30 | (United States) FalconSat 2 | USAF Academy | Intended: Low Earth | Plasma research | T+60 seconds | Launch failure |
| 24 March; 22:30 | Maiden flight of Falcon 1, rocket lost power shortly after launch due to engine fire caused by corrosion of a nut on a fuel line. | | | | | |
| 30 March; 02:30:20 | (Russia) Soyuz-FG | | (Kazakhstan) Baikonur Site 1/5 | | (Russia) Roskosmos | |
| 30 March; 02:30:20 | (Russia) Soyuz TMA-8 | Roskosmos | Low Earth (ISS) | ISS Expedition 13 | 29 September; 01:13 | Successful |
| 30 March; 02:30:20 | Crewed orbital flight with 3 cosmonauts, first Brazilian in space | | | | | |
=== April ===
| 12 April; 23:29:59 | (Ukraine) Zenit-3SL | | (Norway) Ocean Odyssey | | (United Nations) Sea Launch | |
| 12 April; 23:29:59 | (Japan) JCSAT-5A (JCSAT-9, N-STAR d) | JCSAT | Geosynchronous | Communications | In orbit | Operational |
| 15 April; 01:40:00 | (United States) Minotaur I | | (United States) Vandenberg SLC-8 | | (United States) Orbital Sciences | |
| 15 April; 01:40:00 | (United States) (Taiwan) COSMIC-FM1 (FORMOSAT-3A) | NASA / NSPO | Low Earth | Meteorology | In orbit | Successful |
| 15 April; 01:40:00 | (United States) (Taiwan) COSMIC-FM2 (FORMOSAT-3B) | NASA / NSPO | Low Earth | Meteorology | In orbit | Partial spacecraft failure Successful |
| 15 April; 01:40:00 | (United States) (Taiwan) COSMIC-FM3 (FORMOSAT-3C) | NASA / NSPO | Low Earth | Meteorology | In orbit | Partial spacecraft failure Successful |
| 15 April; 01:40:00 | (United States) (Taiwan) COSMIC-FM4 (FORMOSAT-3D) | NASA / NSPO | Low Earth | Meteorology | In orbit | Successful |
| 15 April; 01:40:00 | (United States) (Taiwan) COSMIC-FM5 (FORMOSAT-3E) | NASA / NSPO | Low Earth | Meteorology | In orbit | Successful |
| 15 April; 01:40:00 | (United States) (Taiwan) COSMIC-FM6 (FORMOSAT-3F) | NASA / NSPO | Low Earth | Meteorology | In orbit | Successful |
| 15 April; 01:40:00 | Power system and solar panel malfunctions on FM2 and FM3, control issues with FM6 during 2007. Constellation deactivated on 1 May 2020 after 14 years in operation. | | | | | |
| 20 April; 20:27:00 | (United States) Atlas V 411 | | (United States) Cape Canaveral SLC-41 | | (Russia) (United States) International Launch Services | |
| 20 April; 20:27:00 | (Luxembourg) Astra 1KR | SES Astra | Geosynchronous | Communications | In orbit | Operational |
| 20 April; 20:27:00 | Maiden flight of Atlas V 411, final ILS Atlas launch | | | | | |
| 24 April; 16:03:25 | (Russia) Soyuz-U | | (Kazakhstan) Baikonur Site 1/5 | | (Russia) Roskosmos | |
| 24 April; 16:03:25 | (Russia) Progress M-56 | Roskosmos | Low Earth (ISS) | Logistics | 18 September | Successful |
| 24 April; 16:03:25 | ISS flight 21P | | | | | |
| 25 April; 16:47:16 | (Russia) Start-1 | | (Russia) Svobodny Site 5 | | (Russia) United Start | |
| 25 April; 16:47:16 | (Israel) EROS B | ImageSat | Low Earth (polar) | Imaging | In orbit | Operational |
| 25 April; 16:47:16 | Final launch from Svobodny Cosmodrome | | | | | |
| 26 April; 22:48 | (China) Long March 4B-II (4C) | | (China) Taiyuan LC-1 | | (China) CNSA | |
| 26 April; 22:48 | (China) Yaogan 1 | CAST | Low Earth | Imaging | In orbit | Operational |
| 26 April; 22:48 | Maiden flight of Long March 4B-II, redesignated Long March 4C by November 2007 | | | | | |
| 28 April; 10:02:16 | (United States) Delta II 7420-10C | | (United States) Vandenberg SLC-2W | | (United States) Boeing IDS | |
| 28 April; 10:02:16 | (United States) (France) CALIPSO | NASA/CNES | Sun-synchronous | Climatology | In orbit | Operational |
| 28 April; 10:02:16 | (United States) CloudSat | NASA | Sun-synchronous | Climatology | In orbit | Successful |
| 28 April; 10:02:16 | Both satellites part of the A-train constellation, spacecraft study aerosols and clouds respectively | | | | | |
=== May ===
| 3 May; 17:38 | (Russia) Soyuz-U | | (Russia) Plesetsk Site 16/2 | | (Russia) RVSN | |
| 3 May; 17:38 | (Russia) Kosmos 2420 (Kobal't-M) | VKS | Low Earth | Optical imaging | In orbit | Operational |
| 24 May; 22:11:00 | (United States) Delta IV-M+ (4,2) | | (United States) Cape Canaveral SLC-37B | | (United States) Boeing IDS | |
| 24 May; 22:11:00 | (United States) GOES 13 (GOES-N) | NASA / NOAA / U.S. Space Force | Geosynchronous | Meteorology | In orbit | Operational |
| 24 May; 22:11:00 | Decommissioned in 2018; reactivated in September 2020 to serve as the Electro-Optical Infrared Weather System – Geostationary (EWS-G1) satellite for the U.S. Space Force. | | | | | |
| 26 May; 18:50 | (Russia) Shtil' | | (Russia) K-84 Ekaterinburg, Barents Sea | | (Russia) VMF | |
| 26 May; 18:50 | (Russia) Kompass 2 | Roskosmos | Low Earth | Earthquake detection | 28 December 2011 | Partial spacecraft failure |
| 26 May; 18:50 | Control and power problems made satellite unusable. Written off on 29 May 2006. Problems cleared by November, and satellite re-activated. | | | | | |
| 27 May; 21:09 | rocket= (France) Ariane 5 ECA | | (France) Kourou ELA-3 | | (France) Arianespace | |
| 27 May; 21:09 | (Mexico) Satmex 6 | Satmex | Geosynchronous | Communications | In orbit | Successful |
| 27 May; 21:09 | (Thailand) Thaicom 5 | Shin Satellite | Geosynchronous | Communications | 26 February 2020; 09:52 | Successful |
| 27 May; 21:09 | Record for heaviest dual-payload to geosynchronous transfer orbit, stood until May 2007. | | | | | |
=== June ===
| 15 June; 08:00:00 | (Russia) Soyuz-U | | (Kazakhstan) Baikonur Site 1/5 | | (Russia) Roskosmos | |
| 15 June; 08:00:00 | (Russia) Resurs-DK-1 | Roskosmos | Low Earth | Remote sensing | In orbit | Operational |
| 17 June; 22:44:05 | (Russia) Proton-K/DM-3 | | (Kazakhstan) Baikonur Site 200/39 | | (Russia) Khrunichev | |
| 17 June; 22:44:05 | (Kazakhstan) KazSat-1 | JSC KazSat | Geosynchronous | Communications | In orbit | Spacecraft failure |
| 17 June; 22:44:05 | First Kazakh satellite, satellite suffered control problems and was unusable by October 2008 | | | | | |
| 18 June; 07:50 | (Ukraine) Zenit-3SL | | (Norway) Ocean Odyssey | | (United Nations) Sea Launch | |
| 18 June; 07:50 | (United States) Galaxy 16 | Intelsat | Geosynchronous | Communications | In orbit | Operational |
| 18 June; 07:50 | Launched for PanAmSat, transferred to Intelsat before entry into service due to merger | | | | | |
| 21 June; 22:15 | (United States) Delta II 7925 | | (United States) Cape Canaveral SLC-17A | | (United States) Boeing IDS | |
| 21 June; 22:15 | (United States) USA-187 (MiTEx-A) | US Air Force/DARPA | Geostationary | Technology | In orbit | Operational |
| 21 June; 22:15 | (United States) USA-188 (MiTEx-B) | US Air Force/DARPA | Geostationary | Technology | In orbit | Operational |
| 21 June; 22:15 | (United States) USA-189 (MiTEx Carrier) | NRL/DARPA | Geostationary | Technology | In orbit | Operational |
| 24 June; 15:08:18 | (Russia) Soyuz-U | | (Kazakhstan) Baikonur Site 1/5 | | (Russia) Roskosmos | |
| 24 June; 15:08:18 | (Russia) Progress M-57 | Roskosmos | Low Earth (ISS) | Logistics | 17 January 2007 | Successful |
| 24 June; 15:08:18 | ISS flight 22P | | | | | |
| 25 June; 04:00 | (Ukraine) Tsyklon-2 | | (Kazakhstan) Baikonur Site 90/20 | | (Russia) VKS | |
| 25 June; 04:00 | (Russia) Kosmos 2421 (US-PU) | VMF | Low Earth | ELINT | 20 March 2008 | Partial spacecraft failure |
| 25 June; 04:00 | Final flight of Tsyklon-2 rocket. One of satellite's solar panels failed to deploy, ceased operations in February or March 2008 and destroyed in orbit on 20 March. Spacecraft carried KONUS-A gamma-ray astronomy experiment for Roskosmos | | | | | |
| 28 June; 03:30:00 | (United States) Delta IV-M+ (4,2) | | (United States) Vandenberg SLC-6 | | (United States) Boeing IDS | |
| 28 June; 03:30:00 | (United States) USA-184 (Improved Trumpet) | NRO | Molniya | ELINT | In orbit | Operational |
| 28 June; 03:30:00 | First EELV launch from Vandenberg, carried SBIRS-HEO-1 and TWINS-A instruments for the US Air Force and NASA respectively, NRO Launch 22 | | | | | |
=== July ===
| 4 July; 18:37:55 | (United States) Space Shuttle Discovery | | (United States) Kennedy LC-39B | | (United States) United Space Alliance | |
| 4 July; 18:37:55 | (United States) STS-121 | NASA | Low Earth (ISS) | ISS assembly | 17 July; 13:14 | Successful |
| 4 July; 18:37:55 | (Italy) (United States) Leonardo MPLM | ASI/NASA | Low Earth (ISS) | Logistics | 17 July; 13:14 | Successful |
| 4 July; 18:37:55 | Crewed flight with 7 astronauts, second Return to Flight mission after Columbia accident | | | | | |
| 4 July; 20:01 | (North Korea) Taepodong-2 (Unha-1) | | (North Korea) Musudan-ri | | (North Korea) KPA | |
| 4 July; 20:01 | (North Korea) Kwangmyŏngsŏng-2 (unconfirmed) | KPA | Intended: Low Earth (unconfirmed) | Weather/Communication | +42 seconds | Launch failure |
| 4 July; 20:01 | Maiden flight of Taepodong-2, rocket failed shortly after launch, reaching an apogee of 40 kilometres (25 mi), intended as an orbital launch attempt, but later North Korea claimed for a suborbital missile self-destruct test and destruction success (not launch failure), third of seven North Korean launches in fourteen hours | | | | | |
| 10 July; 12:08 | (India) GSLV | | (India) Satish Dhawan SLP | | (India) ISRO | |
| 10 July; 12:08 | (India) INSAT 4C | ISRO | Intended: Geostationary | Communications | T+60 seconds | Launch failure |
| 10 July; 12:08 | Loss of control due to LRB engine failure, self-destructed 60 seconds into flight | | | | | |
| 12 July; 14:53:36 | (Ukraine) Dnepr | | (Russia) Dombarovskiy | | (Russia) ISC Kosmotras | |
| 12 July; 14:53:36 | (United States) Genesis I | Bigelow | Low Earth | Technology | In orbit | Operational |
| 12 July; 14:53:36 | First uncrewed prototype of a commercial space station module | | | | | |
| 21 July; 04:20:03 | (Russia) Molniya-M | | (Russia) Plesetsk Site 16/2 | | (Russia) VKS | |
| 21 July; 04:20:03 | (Russia) Kosmos 2422 (Oko) | VKS | Molniya | Missile defense | 22 November 2019; 20:15 | Successful |
| 26 July; 19:43:05 | (Ukraine) Dnepr | | (Kazakhstan) Baikonur Site 109/95 | | (Russia) ISC Kosmotras | |
| 26 July; 19:43:05 | (Belarus) BelKA | NAS | Intended: Low Earth | Observation | T+74 seconds | Launch failure |
| 26 July; 19:43:05 | (Italy) Unisat-4 | Sapienza | Intended: Low Earth | Technology | T+74 seconds | Launch failure |
| 26 July; 19:43:05 | (Russia) Baumanets | Roskosmos | Intended: Low Earth | Technology | T+74 seconds | Launch failure |
| 26 July; 19:43:05 | (Italy) PicPot | PoliTo | Intended: Low Earth | Technology | T+74 seconds | Launch failure |
| 26 July; 19:43:05 | (United States) (France) SACRED | Arizona; Montpelier; Alcatel | Intended: Low Earth | Radiation | T+74 seconds | Launch failure |
| 26 July; 19:43:05 | (United States) ION | Illinois | Intended: Low Earth | Technology; Ionospheric | T+74 seconds | Launch failure |
| 26 July; 19:43:05 | (United States) Rincon 1 | Arizona | Intended: Low Earth | Technology | T+74 seconds | Launch failure |
| 26 July; 19:43:05 | (United States) ICECube-1 | Cornell | Intended: Low Earth | Technology | T+74 seconds | Launch failure |
| 26 July; 19:43:05 | (United States) KUTESat Pathfinder | Kansas | Intended: Low Earth | Technology | T+74 seconds | Launch failure |
| 26 July; 19:43:05 | (Japan) SEEDS | Nichidai | Intended: Low Earth | Amateur radio | T+74 seconds | Launch failure |
| 26 July; 19:43:05 | (Norway) nCube-1 | NSSP | Intended: Low Earth | Technology | T+74 seconds | Launch failure |
| 26 July; 19:43:05 | (South Korea) HAUSAT-1 | HAU | Intended: Low Earth | Technology | T+74 seconds | Launch failure |
| 26 July; 19:43:05 | (United States) MEROPE | Montana | Intended: Low Earth | Technology | T+74 seconds | Launch failure |
| 26 July; 19:43:05 | (United States) CP2 | CalPoly | Intended: Low Earth | Technology | T+74 seconds | Launch failure |
| 26 July; 19:43:05 | (United States) AeroCube-1 | Aerospace | Intended: Low Earth | Technology | T+74 seconds | Launch failure |
| 26 July; 19:43:05 | (United States) CP1 | CalPoly | Intended: Low Earth | Technology | T+74 seconds | Launch failure |
| 26 July; 19:43:05 | (United States) Mea Huaka'i (Voyager) | Hawaii | Intended: Low Earth | Technology | T+74 seconds | Launch failure |
| 26 July; 19:43:05 | (United States) ICECube-2 | Cornell | Intended: Low Earth | Technology | T+74 seconds | Launch failure |
| 26 July; 19:43:05 | First-stage engine hydraulic pump failure, thrust termination system activated | | | | | |
| 28 July; 07:05:43 | (Russia) Rokot/Briz-KM | | (Russia) Plesetsk Site 133/3 | | (European Union) (Russia) Eurockot | |
| 28 July; 07:05:43 | (South Korea) Arirang-2 (KOMPSAT-2) | KARI | Low Earth | Earth Observation | In orbit | Operational |
=== August ===
| 4 August; 21:48:00 | (Russia) Proton-M/Briz-M | | (Kazakhstan) Baikonur Site 200/39 | | (Russia) (United States) International Launch Services | |
| 4 August; 21:48:00 | (European Union) Hot Bird 8 | Eutelsat | Geosynchronous | Communications | In orbit | Operational |
| 11 August; 22:15 | (France) Ariane 5ECA | | (France) Kourou ELA-3 | | (France) Arianespace | |
| 11 August; 22:15 | (Japan) JCSat 10 | JSAT | Geosynchronous | Communications | In orbit | Operational |
| 11 August; 22:15 | (France) Syracuse 3B | DGA | Geosynchronous | Communications | In orbit | Operational |
| 22 August; 03:27:01 | (Ukraine) Zenit-3SL | | (Norway) Ocean Odyssey | | (United Nations) Sea Launch | |
| 22 August; 03:27:01 | (South Korea) Koreasat 5 | KT/ADD | Geosynchronous | Communications | In orbit | Operational |
=== September ===
| 9 September; 07:00 | (China) Long March 2C | | (China) Jiuquan LA-4/SLS-2 | | (China) CNSA | |
| 9 September; 07:00 | (China) Shijian 8 | CASC | Low Earth | Biological | 24 September; 02:43 | Successful |
| 9 September; 07:00 | Investigated exposure of seeds to microgravity and radiation, spacecraft recovered after reentry | | | | | |
| 9 September; 15:14:55 | (United States) Space Shuttle Atlantis | | (United States) Kennedy LC-39B | | (United States) United Space Alliance | |
| 9 September; 15:14:55 | (United States) STS-115 | NASA | Low Earth (ISS) | ISS assembly | 21 September; 10:21 | Successful |
| 9 September; 15:14:55 | (United Nations) ITS P3/4 Truss | NASA | Low Earth (ISS) | ISS component | In orbit | Operational |
| 9 September; 15:14:55 | Crewed orbital flight with 6 astronauts, first ISS assembly mission since 2002 | | | | | |
| 11 September; 04:35 | (Japan) H-IIA 202 | | (Japan) Tanegashima LA-Y1 | | (Japan) JAXA | |
| 11 September; 04:35 | (Japan) IGS-3A | CSICE | Low Earth | Optical imaging | 29 October 2016 | |
| 12 September; 16:02 | (China) Long March 3A | | (China) Taiyuan LC-1 | | (China) CNSC | |
| 12 September; 16:02 | (China) ChinaSat 22A | ChinaSat | Geosynchronous | Communications | In orbit | Operational |
| 14 September; 13:41:00 | (Russia) Soyuz-U | | (Kazakhstan) Baikonur Site 31/6 | | (Russia) VKS | |
| 14 September; 13:41:00 | (Russia) Kosmos 2423 (Don) | VKS | Low Earth | Optical imaging | 17 November | Successful |
| 14 September; 13:41:00 | Ceased operations on 14 November, self-destructed 3 days later | | | | | |
| 18 September; 04:08:42 | (Russia) Soyuz-FG | | (Kazakhstan) Baikonur Site 1/5 | | (Russia) Roskosmos | |
| 18 September; 04:08:42 | (Russia) Soyuz TMA-9 | Roskosmos | Low Earth (ISS) | ISS Expedition 14 | 21 April 2007; 12:31 | Successful |
| 18 September; 04:08:42 | Crewed orbital flight with 3 cosmonauts including the first female space tourist and Iranian-born space traveller | | | | | |
| 22 September; 21:36:00 | (Japan) M-V | | (Japan) Uchinoura | | (Japan) JAXA | |
| 22 September; 21:36:00 | (Japan) Hinode (SOLAR-B) | JAXA | Sun-synchronous | Solar | In orbit | Operational |
| 22 September; 21:36:00 | (Japan) HIT-SAT | HIT | Low Earth | Technology | 18 June 2008; 08:48 | Successful |
| 22 September; 21:36:00 | (Japan) SSSAT | JAXA | | Solar sail | 26 September | Spacecraft failure |
| 22 September; 21:36:00 | Final flight of M-V rocket and Mu family, SSSat failed to establish communications with ground | | | | | |
| 25 September; 18:50 | (United States) Delta II 7925 | | (United States) Cape Canaveral SLC-17A | | (United States) Boeing IDS | |
| 25 September; 18:50 | (United States) USA-190 (GPS IIR-15/M2) | US Air Force | Medium Earth | Navigation | In orbit | Operational |
=== October ===
| 13 October; 20:56 | (France) Ariane 5ECA | | (France) Kourou ELA-3 | | (France) Arianespace | |
| 13 October; 20:56 | (United States) DirecTV-9S | DirecTV | Geosynchronous | Communications | In orbit | Operational |
| 13 October; 20:56 | (Australia) Optus D1 | Optus | Geosynchronous | Communications | In orbit | Operational |
| 13 October; 20:56 | (Japan) LDREX-2 | JAXA | Geosynchronous transfer | Technology | 30 September 2010; 02:23 | Successful |
| 19 October; 16:28:13 | (Russia) Soyuz-2.1a/Fregat | | (Kazakhstan) Baikonur Site 31/6 | | (European Union) (Russia) Starsem | |
| 19 October; 16:28:13 | (European Union) MetOp-A | EUMETSAT | Sun-synchronous | Weather | In orbit | Operational |
| 19 October; 16:28:13 | Maiden flight of Soyuz-2.1a/Fregat | | | | | |
| 23 October; 13:40:36 | (Russia) Soyuz-U | | (Russia) Baikonur Site 1/5 | | (Russia) Roskosmos | |
| 23 October; 13:40:36 | (Russia) Progress M-58 | Roskosmos | Low Earth (ISS) | Logistics | 27 March 2007; 22:44 | Successful |
| 23 October; 13:40:36 | ISS flight 23P, antenna stowage issues on 26 October initially prevented full mechanical docking, second attempt was successful. | | | | | |
| 23 October; 23:34 | (China) Long March 4B | | (China) Taiyuan LC-1 | | (China) CNSA | |
| 23 October; 23:34 | (China) Shijian 6-02A | CASC | Low Earth | Environmental | In orbit | Operational |
| 23 October; 23:34 | (China) Shijian 6-02B | CASC | Low Earth | Environmental | In orbit | Operational |
| 26 October; 00:52:00 | (United States) Delta II 7925 | | (United States) Cape Canaveral SLC-17B | | (United States) Boeing IDS | |
| 26 October; 00:52:00 | (United States) STEREO-A | NASA | Heliocentric | Solar | In orbit | Operational |
| 26 October; 00:52:00 | (United States) STEREO-B | NASA | Heliocentric | Solar | In orbit | Operational |
| 28 October; 16:20 | (China) Long March 3B | | (China) Xichang LA-2 | | (China) CASC | |
| 28 October; 16:20 | (China) Sinosat-2 | Sinosat | Intended: Geosynchronous; Achieved: Subsynchronous | Communications | In orbit | Spacecraft failure |
| 28 October; 16:20 | Solar panels and communications antenna failed to deploy | | | | | |
| 30 October; 23:48:59 | (Ukraine) Zenit-3SL | | (Norway) Ocean Odyssey | | (United Nations) Sea Launch | |
| 30 October; 23:48:59 | (United States) XM-4 "Blues" | XM Satellite Radio | Geosynchronous | Communications | In orbit | Operational |
=== November ===
| 4 November; 13:53 | (United States) Delta IV-M | | (United States) Vandenberg SLC-6 | | (United States) Boeing IDS | |
| 4 November; 13:53 | (United States) USA-191 (DMSP F17) | US Air Force/NOAA | Sun-synchronous | Weather | In orbit | Operational |
| 8 November; 20:01:00 | (Russia) Proton-M/Briz-M | | (Kazakhstan) Baikonur Site 200/39 | | (Russia) (United States) International Launch Services | |
| 8 November; 20:01:00 | (Saudi Arabia) Badr-4 (ARABSAT 4B) | ARABSAT | Geosynchronous | Communications | In orbit | Operational |
| 17 November; 19:12:00 | (United States) Delta II 7925 | | (United States) Cape Canaveral SLC-17A | | (United States) Boeing IDS | |
| 17 November; 19:12:00 | (United States) USA-192 (GPS IIR-16/M3) | US Air Force | Medium Earth | Navigation | In orbit | Operational |
=== December ===
| 8 December; 00:53 | (China) Long March 3A | 3A-Y11 | (China) Xichang LC-2 | | (China) CASC | |
| 8 December; 00:53 | (China) Fengyun 2D | CMA | Geosynchronous | Meteorology | In orbit | Operational |
| 8 December; 22:08 | rocket= (France) Ariane 5 ECA | | (France) Kourou ELA-3 | | (France) Arianespace | |
| 8 December; 22:08 | (United States) WildBlue 1 | WildBlue | Geosynchronous | Communications | In orbit | Operational |
| 8 December; 22:08 | (United States) AMC-18 | SES Americom | Geosynchronous | Communications | In orbit | Operational |
| 10 December; 01:47:35 | (United States) Space Shuttle Discovery | | (United States) Kennedy LC-39B | | (United States) United Space Alliance | |
| 10 December; 01:47:35 | (United States) STS-116 | NASA | Low Earth (ISS) | ISS assembly | 22 December; 22:32 | Successful |
| 10 December; 01:47:35 | (United States) Spacehab LSM | NASA | Low Earth (STS) | Logistics | 22 December; 22:32 | Successful |
| 10 December; 01:47:35 | (United Nations) ITS P5 Truss | NASA | Low Earth (ISS) | ISS component | In orbit | Operational |
| 10 December; 01:47:35 | (United States) ANDE-MAA | US Naval Academy | Low Earth | Technology demonstration | 9 February 2007 | Partial spacecraft failure |
| 10 December; 01:47:35 | (United States) ANDE-FACL | US Naval Academy | Low Earth | Technology demonstration | 9 February 2007 | Successful |
| 10 December; 01:47:35 | (United States) RAFT1 | US Naval Academy | Low Earth | Calibration | In orbit | Operational |
| 10 December; 01:47:35 | (United States) MARScom (NMARS) | US Naval Academy | Low Earth | Calibration | In orbit | Operational |
| 10 December; 01:47:35 | (United States) MEPSI-2 | DARPA | Low Earth | Technology demonstration | 8 March 2007 | Successful |
| 10 December; 01:47:35 | Crewed orbital flight with 7 astronauts, including the first Swedish space traveller; ISS crew exchange. ANDE-MAA failed to deploy after becoming stuck in launch canister, but still transmitted data; RAFT1, MARScom, and MEPSI-2 were cubesats. | | | | | |
| 11 December; 23:28:43 | (Russia) Proton-M / Briz-M | | (Kazakhstan) Baikonur Site 200/39 | | (Russia) (United States) International Launch Services | |
| 11 December; 23:28:43 | (Malaysia) MEASAT-3 | MEASAT | Geosynchronous | Communications | In orbit | Operational |
| 14 December; 21:00:00 | (United States) Delta II 7920-10 | | (United States) Vandenberg SLC-2W | | (United States) United Launch Alliance | |
| 14 December; 21:00:00 | (United States) USA-193 | NRO | Low Earth | Reconnaissance; Technology demonstration | 21 February 2008; 03:29 | Spacecraft failure |
| 14 December; 21:00:00 | NRO Launch 21, first launch to be conducted by United Launch Alliance. Satellite failed to contact ground, destroyed by SM-3 ASAT on 21 February 2008. | | | | | |
| 16 December; 12:00:00 | (United States) Minotaur I | | (United States) MARS LP-0B | | (United States) Orbital Sciences | |
| 16 December; 12:00:00 | (United States) TacSat-2 | NRL | Low Earth | Optical imaging Technology demonstration | 5 February 2011 | Successful |
| 16 December; 12:00:00 | ⚀ (United States) GeneSat-1 | NASA | Low Earth | Biological science | 4 August 2010; 20:43 | Successful |
| 16 December; 12:00:00 | First launch from Mid-Atlantic Regional Spaceport. Little or no imagery returned by TacSat due to political dispute. TacSat lost contact with ground in January 2008. | | | | | |
| 18 December; 06:32 | (Japan) H-IIA 204 | | (Japan) Tanegashima LA-Y1 | | (Japan) JAXA | |
| 18 December; 06:32 | (Japan) Kiku-8 (ETS-VIII) | JAXA | Geosynchronous | Technology demonstration | In orbit | Successful |
| 18 December; 06:32 | Maiden flight of H-IIA 204, full spacecraft antenna deployment one day late. | | | | | |
| 19 December; 14:00:19 | (Russia) Kosmos-3M | | (Russia) Plesetsk Site 132/1 | | (Germany) (Russia) COSMOS International | |
| 19 December; 14:00:19 | (Germany) SAR-Lupe 1 | Bundeswehr | Low Earth (SSO) | Earth observation | In orbit | Operational |
| 24 December; 08:34:44 | (Russia) Soyuz-2.1a / Fregat | | (Russia) Plesetsk Site 43/4 | | (Russia) VKS | |
| 24 December; 08:34:44 | (Russia) Meridian 1 (11L) | VKS | Molniya | Communications | 6 July 2021; 12:20 | Successful |
| 25 December; 20:18:12 | (Russia) Proton-K / DM-2 | | (Russia) Baikonur Site 81/24 | | (Russia) VKS | |
| 25 December; 20:18:12 | (Russia) Kosmos 2424 (GLONASS-M) | KNITs | Medium Earth | Navigation | In orbit | Operational |
| 25 December; 20:18:12 | (Russia) Kosmos 2425 (GLONASS-M) | KNITs | Medium Earth | Navigation | In orbit | Operational |
| 25 December; 20:18:12 | (Russia) Kosmos 2426 (GLONASS-M) | KNITs | Medium Earth | Navigation | In orbit | Operational |
| 27 December; 14:23:38 | (Russia) Soyuz-2.1b / Fregat | | (Kazakhstan) Baikonur Site 31/6 | | rocket= (France) (Russia) Starsem | |
| 27 December; 14:23:38 | (France) CoRoT | CNES | Low Earth (Polar) | Exoplanetology; Asteroseismology | In orbit | Successful |
| 27 December; 14:23:38 | Maiden flight of Soyuz-2.1b/Fregat. | | | | | |

- ← Jan
- Feb
- Mar
- Apr
- May
- Jun
- Jul
- Aug
- Sep
- Oct
- Nov
- Dec →

== Suborbital launches ==
- ← Jan
- Feb
- Mar
- Apr
- May
- Jun
- Jul
- Aug
- Sep
- Oct
- Nov
- Dec →

| Date and time (UTC) | Rocket | Flight number | Launch site | | LSP | |
| Date and time (UTC) | Payload (⚀ = CubeSat) | Operator | Orbit | Function | Decay (UTC) | Outcome |
| Date and time (UTC) | Remarks | | | | | |
|---|---|---|---|---|---|---|
=== January ===
| 18 January; 11:48 | Taiwan Sounding Rocket | Sounding Rocket V | (Taiwan) Jiu Peng Air Base | | (Taiwan) NSPO | |
| 18 January; 11:48 | (Taiwan) Ion probe, 3-axis flux-gate magnetometer | NSPO/NCU | Suborbital | Ionospheric research, technology test | 11:57 | Successful |
| 18 January; 11:48 | Apogee: 282 kilometres (175 mi) | | | | | |
| 22 January; 04:00 | (Japan) S-310 | | (Japan) Uchinoura | | (Japan) JAXA | |
| 22 January; 04:00 | (Japan) Furoshiki | JAXA | Suborbital | Technology | 22 January | Successful |
| 22 January; 04:00 | Apogee: 130 kilometres (81 mi) | | | | | |
=== February ===
| 6 February | (China) Dong Feng 21 | | (China) Xichang | | (China) PLA | |
| 6 February | | PLA | Suborbital | ASAT | 6 February | Spacecraft failure |
| 6 February | Apogee: 800 kilometres (500 mi), missed satellite | | | | | |
| 8 February; 18:47 | (Canada) Black Brant IX | | (United States) White Sands LC-36 | | (United States) NASA | |
| 8 February; 18:47 | (United States) MOSES | | Suborbital | Solar | 8 February | Successful |
| 8 February; 18:47 | Apogee: 282 kilometres (175 mi) | | | | | |
| 16 February; 08:01 | (United States) LGM-30G Minuteman III | | (United States) Vandenberg LF-10 | | (United States) US Air Force | |
| 16 February; 08:01 | (United States) SERV-3 | US Air Force | Suborbital | Missile test | 16 February | Successful |
| 16 February; 08:01 | Apogee: 1,300 kilometres (810 mi) | | | | | |
| 23 February; 16:09 | (United States) UGM-27 Polaris (STARS) | | (United States) Kodiak | | (United States) Sandia | |
| 23 February; 16:09 | (United States) FT-03-1 | | Suborbital | Target | 23 February | Successful |
| 23 February; 16:09 | Apogee: 1,000 kilometres (620 mi) | | | | | |
=== March ===
| 8 March; 08:45 | (United States) RIM-161 Standard Missile 3 | | (United States) USS Lake Erie, PMRF | | (United States) US Navy | |
| 8 March; 08:45 | (United States) (Japan) JCTV-1 | US Navy/MDA/JMSDF | Suborbital | Missile test | 8 March | Successful |
| 8 March; 08:45 | Apogee: 150 kilometres (93 mi) | | | | | |
| 25 March; 03:15 | (United States) Terrier-Orion | | (Australia) Woomera LA-2 | | (Australia) Queensland | |
| 25 March; 03:15 | (Australia) Hyshot-3 | Queensland | Suborbital | Hypersonic research | 03:25 | Successful |
| 25 March; 03:15 | Apogee: 325 kilometres (202 mi) | | | | | |
| 30 March; 02:40 | (United States) Terrier-Orion | | (Australia) Woomera LA-2 | | (Australia) Queensland | |
| 30 March; 02:40 | (Australia) (Japan) Hyshot-4 | Queensland/JAXA | Suborbital | Hypersonic research | 30 March | Launch failure |
| 30 March; 02:40 | Apogee: 290 kilometres (180 mi), nosecone failed to separate | | | | | |
=== April ===
| 7 April; 13:00 | (United States) LGM-30G Minuteman III | | (United States) Vandenberg LF-26 | | (United States) US Air Force | |
| 7 April; 13:00 | (United States) GT-190GM | US Air Force | Suborbital | Missile test | 7 April | Successful |
| 7 April; 13:00 | Long-range test, aimed at Guam, apogee: 1,300 kilometres (810 mi) | | | | | |
| 12 April; 18:10 | (Canada) Black Brant IX | | (United States) White Sands LC-36 | | (United States) NASA | |
| 12 April; 18:10 | (United States) EUNIS | NASA | Suborbital | Solar | 12 April | Successful |
| 12 April; 18:10 | Apogee: 318 kilometres (198 mi) | | | | | |
| 13 April | (United States) SR19-SR19 | | (United States) PMRF | | (United States) Sandia | |
| 13 April | (United States) FTC-02B | MDA | Suborbital | Target | 13 April | Successful |
| 13 April | Apogee: 200 kilometres (120 mi) | | | | | |
| 22 April; 16:40 | (Russia) Kosmos-3MR | | (Russia) Kapustin Yar Site 107/1 | | (Russia) RVSN | |
| 22 April; 16:40 | (Russia) PBS-2 | RVSN | Suborbital | REV test | 22 April | Successful |
| 22 April; 16:40 | Apogee: 675 kilometres (419 mi) | | | | | |
| 28 April | (United States) SR19-SR19 | | (United States) PMRF | | (United States) Sandia | |
| 28 April | (United States) FTC-02 | MDA | Suborbital | Target | 28 April | Successful |
| 28 April | Apogee: 200 kilometres (120 mi) | | | | | |
| 29 April | (Pakistan) Shaheen-II | | (Pakistan) Sonmiani | | Army of Pakistan | |
| 29 April | | Army of Pakistan | Suborbital | Target | 29 April | Successful |
| 29 April | Apogee: 300 kilometres (190 mi) | | | | | |
=== May ===
| 2 May; 06:16 | (United States) Maxus (Castor 4B) | | (Sweden) Esrange | | (European Union) EuroLaunch | |
| 2 May; 06:16 | (Sweden) MAXUS 9 | ESA/SSC | Suborbital | Microgravity | 2 May | Successful |
| 2 May; 06:16 | Apogee: 702 kilometres (436 mi) | | | | | |
| 10 May; 08:12 | (Brazil) VSB-30 | | (Sweden) Esrange | | (European Union) EuroLaunch | |
| 10 May; 08:12 | (Germany) (Sweden) TEXUS-43 | DLR/SSC | Suborbital | Microgravity | 10 May | Successful |
| 10 May; 08:12 | Apogee: 237 kilometres (147 mi) | | | | | |
| 11 May | (United States) THAAD | | (United States) White Sands | | (United States) US Army | |
| 11 May | (United States) FTT-02 | MDA | Suborbital | ABM test | 11 May | Successful |
| 11 May | Apogee: 100 kilometres (62 mi), simulated intercept | | | | | |
| 22 May; 09:30 | (United States) Terrier-Orion | | (United States) White Sands | | (United States) NASA | |
| 22 May; 09:30 | (United States) ACS | NASA | Suborbital | Test | 22 May | Successful |
| 22 May; 09:30 | Apogee: 150 kilometres (93 mi) | | | | | |
| 22 May | (Iran) Shahab-3 | | (Iran) Shahrood | | (Iran) IRG | |
| 22 May | | IRG | Suborbital | Missile test | 22 May | Successful |
| 22 May | Apogee: 150 kilometres (93 mi) | | | | | |
=== June ===
| 5 June; 16:05 | (United States) Terrier-Orion | | (United States) White Sands | | (United States) NASA | |
| 5 June; 16:05 | | NAWC | Suborbital | Target | 5 June | Successful |
| 5 June; 16:05 | Apogee: 130 kilometres (81 mi) | | | | | |
| 7 June; 22:00 | (United States) Terrier-Orion | | (United States) PMRF | | (United States) NASA | |
| 7 June; 22:00 | | NAWC | Suborbital | Target | 7 June | Successful |
| 7 June; 22:00 | Apogee: 130 kilometres (81 mi) | | | | | |
| 8 June; 16:00 | (United States) Terrier-Orion | | (United States) White Sands | | (United States) NASA | |
| 8 June; 16:00 | (United States) DUNDEE | NAWC | Suborbital | Target | 8 June | Successful |
| 8 June; 16:00 | Apogee: 130 kilometres (81 mi) | | | | | |
| 14 June; 08:22 | (United States) LGM-30G Minuteman III | | (United States) Vandenberg LF-04 | | (United States) US Air Force | |
| 14 June; 08:22 | (United States) GT-191GM | US Air Force | Suborbital | Missile test | 14 June | Successful |
| 14 June; 08:22 | Carried three Mk. 21 re-entry vehicles, Apogee: 1,300 kilometres (810 mi) | | | | | |
| 22 June; 22:00 | (United States) MRT (Castor 4B) | | (United States) PMRT | | (United States) US Navy | |
| 22 June; 22:00 | (United States) FTM-10 Target | US Navy/MDA | Suborbital | Target | 22 June | Successful |
| 22 June; 22:00 | Intercepted by SM-3, apogee: 150 kilometres (93 mi) | | | | | |
| 22 June; 22:04 | (United States) RIM-161 Standard Missile 3 | | (United States) USS Shiloh, PMRF | | (United States) US Navy | |
| 22 June; 22:04 | (United States) FTM-10 | US Navy/MDA | Suborbital | ABM test | 22 June | Successful |
| 22 June; 22:04 | Intercepted MRT, apogee: 150 kilometres (93 mi) | | | | | |
| 23 June; 23:02 | (United States) Terrier-Orion | | (United States) PMRF | | (United States) NASA | |
| 23 June; 23:02 | (United States) TRACKEX | NAWC/MDA | Suborbital | Target | 23 June | Successful |
| 23 June; 23:02 | Apogee: 130 kilometres (81 mi) | | | | | |
| 30 June; 06:25 | (Russia) R-29RMU Sineva | | (Russia) K-84 Ekaterinburg, Barents Sea | | (Russia) VMF | |
| 30 June; 06:25 | | VMF | Suborbital | Missile test | 30 June | Successful |
| 30 June; 06:25 | Apogee: 1,000 kilometres (620 mi) | | | | | |
=== July ===
| 1 July; 06:39 | (United States) Terrier-Orion | | (Norway) Andøya | | (United States) Andøya/NASA | |
| 1 July; 06:39 | (United States) / (Norway) SPIRIT-III | ESPRIT | Suborbital | Ionospheric; Plasma research | 1 July | Successful |
| 1 July; 06:39 | Apogee: 200 kilometres (120 mi) | | | | | |
| 1 July; 06:39 | (United States) Terrier-Orion | | (Norway) Andøya | | (Norway) Andøya | |
| 1 July; 06:39 | (Norway) HotPay-1 | Andøya | Suborbital | Aeronomy | 1 July | Launch failure |
| 1 July; 06:39 | Apogee: 40 kilometres (25 mi) | | | | | |
| 4 July; 18:32 | (North Korea) Hwasong-6 | | (North Korea) Kittaeryong | | (North Korea) KPA | |
| 4 July; 18:32 | | KPA | Suborbital | Missile test | 4 July | Successful |
| 4 July; 18:32 | Apogee: 150 kilometres (93 mi), first of seven North Korean launches in fourteen hours | | | | | |
| 4 July; 19:04 | (North Korea) Hwasong-7 | | (North Korea) Kittaeryong | | (North Korea) KPA | |
| 4 July; 19:04 | | KPA | Suborbital | Missile test | 4 July | Successful |
| 4 July; 19:04 | Apogee: 150 kilometres (93 mi), second of seven North Korean launches in fourteen hours | | | | | |
| 4 July; 22:31 | (North Korea) Hwasong-7 | | (North Korea) Kittaeryong | | (North Korea) KPA | |
| 4 July; 22:31 | | KPA | Suborbital | Missile test | 4 July | Successful |
| 4 July; 22:31 | Apogee: 150 kilometres (93 mi), fourth of seven North Korean launches in fourteen hours | | | | | |
| 4 July; 22:12 | (North Korea) Hwasong-6 | | (North Korea) Kittaeryong | | (North Korea) KPA | |
| 4 July; 22:12 | | KPA | Suborbital | Missile test | 4 July | Successful |
| 4 July; 22:12 | Apogee: 150 kilometres (93 mi), fifth of seven North Korean launches in fourteen hours | | | | | |
| 4 July; 23:20 | (North Korea) Hwasong-7 | | (North Korea) Kittaeryong | | (North Korea) KPA | |
| 4 July; 23:20 | | KPA | Suborbital | Missile test | 4 July | Successful |
| 4 July; 23:20 | Apogee: 150 kilometres (93 mi), sixth of seven North Korean launches in fourteen hours | | | | | |
| 5 July; 08:20 | (North Korea) Hwasong-7 | | (North Korea) Kittaeryong | | (North Korea) KPA | |
| 5 July; 08:20 | | KPA | Suborbital | Missile test | 5 July | Successful |
| 5 July; 08:20 | Apogee: 150 kilometres (93 mi), last of seven North Korean launches in fourteen hours | | | | | |
| 9 July; 05:33 | (India) Agni III | | (India) Integrated Test Range LC-4 | | (India) DRDO | |
| 9 July; 05:33 | | DRDO | Suborbital | Missile test | 9 July | Successful |
| 9 July; 05:33 | Apogee: 100 kilometres (62 mi) | | | | | |
| 12 July; 11:17 | (United States) Hera | | (United States) White Sands | | (United States) US Army | |
| 12 July; 11:17 | (United States) FFT-4 Target | US Army/MDA | Suborbital | Target | 12 July | Successful |
| 12 July; 11:17 | Apogee: 300 kilometres (190 mi), Intercepted after reentry by endoatmospheric THAAD launched at 11:20 | | | | | |
| 21 July; 10:14 | (United States) LGM-30G Minuteman III | | (United States) Vandenberg LF-09 | | (United States) US Air Force | |
| 21 July; 10:14 | (United States) GT-192GM | US Air Force | Suborbital | Missile test | 21 July | Successful |
| 21 July; 10:14 | Carried three Mk.21 reentry vehicles, apogee: 1,300 kilometres (810 mi) | | | | | |
=== August ===
| 3 August; 10:38 | (Russia) RT-2PM Topol (RS-12M) | | (Russia) Plesetsk | | (Russia) (United States) RVSN | |
| 3 August; 10:38 | | RVSN | Suborbital | Missile test | 11:04 | Successful |
| 3 August; 10:38 | Apogee: 1,000 kilometres (620 mi), impacted Kura Test Range | | | | | |
| 21 August; 14:30 | (Canada) Black Brant IX | | (United States) White Sands LC-36 | | (United States) NASA | |
| 21 August; 14:30 | | MDA | Suborbital | Target | 21 August | Successful |
| 21 August; 14:30 | Apogee: 380 kilometres (240 mi) | | | | | |
| 25 August; 14:30 | (Canada) Black Brant IX | | (United States) White Sands LC-36 | | (United States) NASA | |
| 25 August; 14:30 | | MDA | Suborbital | Target | 21 August | Successful |
| 25 August; 14:30 | Apogee: 382 kilometres (237 mi), THAAD target | | | | | |
=== September ===
| 1 September; 17:22 | (United States) UGM-27 Polaris (STARS) | | (United States) Kodiak | | (United States) Sandia | |
| 1 September; 17:22 | (United States) GMD FTG-02 target | MDA | Suborbital | Target | 1 September | Successful |
| 1 September; 17:22 | Apogee: 1,000 kilometres (620 mi), intercepted by GBI | | | | | |
| 1 September; 17:39 | (United States) Orbital Boost Vehicle | | (United States) Vandenberg LF-23 | | (United States) Orbital Sciences/MDA | |
| 1 September; 17:39 | (United States) GMD FTG-02 | MDA | Suborbital | ABM test | 1 September | Successful |
| 1 September; 17:39 | Apogee: 1,000 kilometres (620 mi), intercepted STARS | | | | | |
| 4 September | (China) Dong Feng 31 | | (China) Taiyuan | | (China) PLA | |
| 4 September | | PLA | Suborbital | Missile test | 4 September | Successful |
| 4 September | Apogee: 1,000 kilometres (620 mi) | | | | | |
| 7 September; 15:50 | (Russia) RSM-56 Bulava (R-30) | | (Russia) RFS Dmitriy Donskoy, White Sea | | (Russia) VMF | |
| 7 September; 15:50 | | VMF | Suborbital | Missile test | 7 September | Launch failure |
| 7 September; 15:50 | Apogee: 1 kilometre (0.62 mi), first stage malfunction | | | | | |
| 9 September; 11:20 | (Russia) R-29RMU Sineva | | (Russia) K-84 Ekaterinburg, North Pole | | (Russia) VMF | |
| 9 September; 11:20 | | VMF | Suborbital | Missile test | 9 September | Successful |
| 9 September; 11:20 | Apogee: 1,000 kilometres (620 mi) | | | | | |
| 9 September; 22:17:00 | (United States) Nike-Orion | | (Norway) Andøya | | (Norway) Andøya | |
| 9 September; 22:17:00 | (Norway) (Germany) ECOMA-1 | Andøya/DLR | Suborbital | Atmospheric | 9 September | Successful |
| 9 September; 22:17:00 | Apogee: 130 kilometres (81 mi) | | | | | |
| 10 September; 14:50 | (Russia) R-29R Volna | | (Russia) K-433 Svyaity Georgiy, Simushir | | (Russia) VMF | |
| 10 September; 14:50 | | VMF | Suborbital | Missile test | 10 September | Successful |
| 10 September; 14:50 | Apogee: 1,000 kilometres (620 mi) | | | | | |
| 13 September; 10:30 | (United States) Hera | | (United States) White Sands | | (United States) US Army | |
| 13 September; 10:30 | (United States) FFT-5 Target | US Army/MDA | Suborbital | Target | 13 September | Successful |
| 13 September; 10:30 | Apogee: 300 kilometres (190 mi), THAAD target | | | | | |
| 17 September; 21:06:46 | (United States) Nike-Orion | | (Norway) Andøya | | (Norway) Andøya | |
| 17 September; 21:06:46 | (Norway) (Germany) ECOMA-2 | Andøya/DLR | Suborbital | Atmospheric | 17 September | Successful |
| 17 September; 21:06:46 | Apogee: 129 kilometres (80 mi) | | | | | |
| 23 September; 15:17:54 | (Canada) Black Brant XI | | (United States) Wallops Island | | (United States) NASA | |
| 23 September; 15:17:54 | | NASA | Suborbital | Test | 23 September | Successful |
| 23 September; 15:17:54 | Apogee: 300 kilometres (190 mi) | | | | | |
| 25 September; 20:14 | (United States) SpaceLoft XL | | (United States) Spaceport America | | (United States) UP Aerospace | |
| 25 September; 20:14 | | Various | Suborbital | Various | T+60 seconds | Launch failure |
| 25 September; 20:14 | Maiden flight of SpaceLoft XL sounding rocket, first flight from Spaceport America, rocket went out of control and failed to reach space, apogee: 12 kilometres (7.5 mi) | | | | | |
=== October ===
| 25 October; 13:05 | (Russia) RSM-56 Bulava (R-30) | | (Russia) RFS Dmitriy Donskoy, Beloye More | | (Russia) VMF | |
| 25 October; 13:05 | | VMF | Suborbital | Missile test | 25 October | Launch failure |
| 25 October; 13:05 | Apogee: 100 kilometres (62 mi), first stage malfunction | | | | | |
| 28 October; 17:58:00 | (Canada) Black Brant IX | | (United States) White Sands LC-36 | | (United States) NASA | |
| 28 October; 17:58:00 | (United States) LASP | | Suborbital | Solar | 28 October | Successful |
| 28 October; 17:58:00 | Apogee: 300 kilometres (190 mi) | | | | | |
=== November ===
| 2 November | (Iran) Shahab-3 | | (Iran) Shahrood | | (Iran) IRG | |
| 2 November | | IRG | Suborbital | Missile test | 2 November | Successful |
| 2 November | Apogee: 150 kilometres (93 mi) | | | | | |
| 7 November; 19:30 | (Canada) Black Brant IX | | (United States) White Sands LC-36 | | (United States) NASA | |
| 7 November; 19:30 | (United States) USC-7 | | Suborbital | Solar | 7 November | Successful |
| 7 November; 19:30 | Apogee: 300 kilometres (190 mi) | | | | | |
| 9 November; 08:51 | (France) M51 | | (France) Biscarosse | | (France) French Navy | |
| 9 November; 08:51 | | French Navy | Suborbital | Missile test | 9 November | Successful |
| 9 November; 08:51 | Apogee: 1,000 kilometres (620 mi) | | | | | |
| 9 November; 11:35 | (Russia) UR-100NU | | (Kazakhstan) Baikonur Site 175/2 | | (Russia) RVSN | |
| 9 November; 11:35 | | RVSN | Suborbital | Missile test | 9 November | Successful |
| 9 November; 11:35 | Apogee: 1,000 kilometres (620 mi) | | | | | |
| 16 November | (United States) Terrier-Orion | | (United States) PMRF | | (United States) US Navy | |
| 16 November | (United States) ARAV-B | US Navy | Suborbital | Target | 16 November | Successful |
| 16 November | Apogee: 150 kilometres (93 mi) | | | | | |
| 16 November | (Pakistan) Ghauri | | (Pakistan) Tilla | | Army of Pakistan | |
| 16 November | (Pakistan) Haft-5 | Army of Pakistan | Suborbital | Missile test | 16 November | Successful |
| 16 November | Apogee: 100 kilometres (62 mi) | | | | | |
| 21 November; 02:00 | (Canada) Black Brant IX | | (United States) White Sands LC-36 | | (United States) NASA | |
| 21 November; 02:00 | (United States) CyXESS | | Suborbital | XR Astronomy | 21 November | Successful |
| 21 November; 02:00 | Apogee: 300 kilometres (190 mi) | | | | | |
| 21 November | (United States) UGM-133 Trident II (D5) | | (United States) USS Maryland, ETR | | (United States) US Navy | |
| 21 November | | US Navy | Suborbital | Missile test | 21 November | Successful |
| 21 November | Apogee: 1,000 kilometres (620 mi) | | | | | |
| 21 November | (United States) UGM-133 Trident II (D5) | | (United States) USS Maryland, ETR | | (United States) US Navy | |
| 21 November | | US Navy | Suborbital | Missile test | 21 November | Successful |
| 21 November | Apogee: 1,000 kilometres (620 mi) | | | | | |
| 26 November | (India) Prithvi | | (India) Integrated Test Range LC-3 | | (India) DRDO | |
| 26 November | | DRDO | Suborbital | Missile test | 26 November | Successful |
| 26 November | Apogee: 100 kilometres (62 mi) | | | | | |
| 27 November; 04:45 | (India) Prithvi | | (India) Integrated Test Range LC-3 | | (India) DRDO | |
| 27 November; 04:45 | | DRDO | Suborbital | Target | 27 November | Successful |
| 27 November; 04:45 | Apogee: 100 kilometres (62 mi), intercepted by another Prithvi | | | | | |
| 27 November; 04:46 | (India) Prithvi | | (India) Integrated Test Range LC-4 | | (India) DRDO | |
| 27 November; 04:46 | | DRDO | Suborbital | ABM test | 27 November | Successful |
| 27 November; 04:46 | Apogee: 100 kilometres (62 mi), intercepted another Prithvi | | | | | |
| 29 November | (Pakistan) Shaheen-I | | (Pakistan) Sonmiani | | Army of Pakistan | |
| 29 November | (Pakistan) Haft-4 | Army of Pakistan | Suborbital | Target | 29 November | Successful |
| 29 November | Apogee: 100 kilometres (62 mi) | | | | | |
=== December ===
| 7 December | (United States) Aries | | (United States) PMRF | | (United States) U.S. Navy | |
| 7 December | (United States) FTM-11 Target | U.S. Navy / MDA | Suborbital | Target | 7 December | Successful |
| 7 December | Apogee: 300 kilometres (190 mi), AEGIS target | | | | | |
| 24 December | (Russia) RSM-56 Bulava (R-30) | | (Russia) RFS Dmitriy Donskoy, Beloye More | | (Russia) VMF | |
| 24 December | (Russia) | VMF | Suborbital | Missile test | 24 December | Launch failure |
| 24 December | Apogee: 1 kilometre (0.62 mi), first stage malfunction. | | | | | |
=== Unknown date ===
| Unknown | (United States) UGM-133 Trident II (D5) | | (United States) Submarine, WTR | | (United States) U.S. Navy | |
| Unknown | (United States) | U.S. Navy | Suborbital | Missile test | | Successful |
| Unknown | Apogee: 1,000 kilometres (620 mi) | | | | | |
| Unknown | (United States) UGM-133 Trident II (D5) | | (United States) Submarine, WTR | | (United States) U.S. Navy | |
| Unknown | (United States) | U.S. Navy | Suborbital | Missile test | | Successful |
| Unknown | Apogee: 1,000 kilometres (620 mi) | | | | | |

- ← Jan
- Feb
- Mar
- Apr
- May
- Jun
- Jul
- Aug
- Sep
- Oct
- Nov
- Dec →

== Deep Space Rendezvous in 2006 ==
| Date (GMT) | Spacecraft | Event | Remarks |
|---|---|---|---|
| 15 January | Stardust | First sample return mission from comet | space capsule landing on Earth with cometary samples |
| 15 January | Cassini | 10th flyby of Titan | Closest approach: 2,042 kilometres (1,269 mi) |
| 27 February | Cassini | 11th flyby of Titan | Closest approach: 1,812 kilometres (1,126 mi) |
| 10 March | Mars Reconnaissance Orbiter | Areocentric orbit injection | |
| 18 March | Cassini | 12th flyby of Titan | Closest approach: 1,947 kilometres (1,210 mi) |
| 11 April | Venus Express | Cytherean orbit injection | |
| 30 April | Cassini | 13th flyby of Titan | Closest approach: 1,853 kilometres (1,151 mi) |
| 20 May | Cassini | 14th flyby of Titan | Closest approach: 1,879 kilometres (1,168 mi) |
| 2 July | Cassini | 15th flyby of Titan | Closest approach: 1,911 kilometres (1,187 mi) |
| 22 July | Cassini | 16th flyby of Titan | Closest approach: 950 kilometres (590 mi) |
| 4 September | SMART-1 | Lunar impact | |
| 7 September | Cassini | 17th flyby of Titan | Closest approach: 950 kilometres (590 mi) |
| 23 September | Cassini | 18th flyby of Titan | Closest approach: 950 kilometres (590 mi) |
| 9 October | Cassini | 19th flyby of Titan | Closest approach: 950 kilometres (590 mi) |
| 23 October | MESSENGER | 1st flyby of Venus | Gravity assist |
| 25 October | Cassini | 20th flyby of Titan | Closest approach: 950 kilometres (590 mi) |
| 12 December | Cassini | 21st flyby of Titan | Closest approach: 950 kilometres (590 mi) |
| 28 December | Cassini | 22nd flyby of Titan | Closest approach: 1,500 kilometres (930 mi) |

== EVAs ==
| Start date/time | Duration | End time | Spacecraft | Crew | Function | Remarks |
|---|---|---|---|---|---|---|
| 3 February; 09:55 | 5 hours 43 minutes | 16:27 | Expedition 12; ISS Pirs | (United States) William S. McArthur (Russia) Valery Tokarev | Released SuitSat-1, retrieved the Biorisk experiment, photographed a sensor for a micrometeoroid experiment, and tied off the surviving umbilical of the Mobile Transporter. | |
| 1 June; 23:48 | 6 hours 31 minutes | 2 June; 06:19 | Expedition 13; ISS Pirs | (Russia) Pavel Vinogradov (United States) Jeffrey Williams | Repaired a vent for the Elektron unit, retrieved a Biorisk experiment, retrieved a contamination-monitoring device from Zvezda, and replaced a malfunctioning camera on the Mobile Base System. | |
| 8 July; 13:17 | 7 hours 31 minutes | 20:48 | STS-121; ISS Quest | (United Kingdom) / (United States) Piers Sellers (United States) Michael E. Fossum | Installed a blade blocker in the zenith Interface Umbilical Assembly (IUA) to protect the undamaged power, data and video cable, rerouted the cable to prepare for the second EVA. Tested the combination of the Shuttle's Canadarm(SRMS) and the Orbiter Boom Sensor System as a platform for astronauts to make repairs to a damaged orbiter. | |
| 10 July; 12:14 | 6 hours 47 minutes | 19:01 | STS-121; ISS Quest | (United Kingdom) / (United States) Piers Sellers (United States) Michael E. Fossum | Restored the Mobile Transporter to full operation, and delivered a spare pump module for the station's cooling system. | |
| 12 July; 07:11 | 6 hours 20 minutes | 13:31 | STS-121; ISS Quest | (United Kingdom) / (United States) Piers Sellers (United States) Michael E. Fossum | Used an infrared camera to shoot 20 seconds of video of selected reinforced carbon-carbon (RCC) panels on the shuttle wing's leading edge, and then moved to the payload bay to test a shuttle tile repair material known as NOAX on pre-damaged shuttle tiles that were flown in a test container. | |
| 3 August; 14:04 | 5 hours 54 minutes | 19:58 | Expedition 13; ISS Quest | (United States) Jeffrey Williams (Germany) Thomas Reiter | Installed the Floating Potential Measurement Unit, two MISSE containers, a controller for a thermal radiator rotary joint on the S1 truss, a starboard jumper and spool positioning device on S1, a light on the truss railway handcart, and installed and replaced a malfunctioning GPS antenna. Tested an infrared camera designed to detect damage in a shuttle's thermal protection tiles. Inspection and photography of a scratch on the Quest airlock hatch. | |
| 12 September; 10:17 | 5 hours 26 minutes | 15:43 | STS-115; ISS Quest | (United States) Joseph R. Tanner (United States) Heidemarie Stefanyshyn-Piper | Initial installation of the P3/P4 truss. Connected power cables on the truss, released the launch restraints on the solar array blanket box, the Beta Gimbal Assembly, and the solar array wings. Configured the Solar Alpha Rotary Joint, and removed two circuit interrupt devices to prepare for STS-116. | Piper became the 7th American and the 8th female spacewalker. |
| 13 September; 09:05 | 7 hours 11 minutes | 16:16 | STS-115; ISS Quest | (United States) Daniel C. Burbank (Canada) Steven MacLean | Continued installation of the P3/4 truss onto the station, and activated the SARJ. | |
| 15 September; 10:00 | 6 hours 42 minutes | 16:42 | STS-115; ISS Quest | (United States) Joseph R. Tanner (United States) Heidemarie Stefanyshyn-Piper | Installed a radiator onto the P3/4 truss, powered up a cooling radiator for the new solar arrays, replaced an S-Band radio antenna, and installed insulation for another antenna. Tanner took photos of the shuttle's wings using an infrared camera. | |
| 22 November; 23:17 | 5 hours 38 minutes | 23 November; 04:55 | Expedition 14; ISS Pirs | (Russia) Mikhail Tyurin (United States) Michael Lopez-Alegria | "Orbiting golf shot" event sponsored by a Canadian golf company. Lopez-Alegria put the tee on the ladder outside Pirs, while Tyurin set up a camera, and then performed the golf shot. Inspected and photographed a Kurs antenna, relocated an ATV WAL antenna, installed a BTN neutron experiment, and jettisoned two thermal covers from the BTN. | |
| 12 December; 20:31 | 6 hours 36 minutes | 13 December; 03:07 | STS-116; ISS Quest | (United States) Robert Curbeam (Sweden) Christer Fuglesang | Installed the P5 Truss, and replaced a video camera on the S1 truss. | |
| 14 December; 19:41 | 5 hours | 15 December; 00:41 | STS-116; ISS Quest | (United States) Robert Curbeam (Sweden) Christer Fuglesang | Reconfigured channels 2–3 on the P3/P4 truss to take advantage of the new solar arrays, relocated two handcarts that run along the station's main truss, put a thermal cover on the station's robotic arm, and installed bags of tools for future spacewalkers. | |
| 16 December; 19:25 | 7 hours 31 minutes | 17 December; 02:57 | STS-116; ISS Quest | (United States) Robert Curbeam (United States) Sunita Williams | Reconfigured channels 1 and 4 on the P3/P4 truss to take advantage of the new solar arrays, installed a robotic arm grapple fixture, and positioned three bundles ofdebris shield panels outside Zvezda. Additional time was spent trying to help retract the P6 solar array panel by shaking the panel's blanket box from its base. | Williams became the 8th American and the 9th female spacewalker. |
| 18 December; 19:00 | 6 hours 38 minutes | 19 December; 01:38 | STS-116; ISS Quest | (United States) Robert Curbeam (Sweden) Christer Fuglesang | Assisted ground controllers with retracting the P6 solar array panels. | |

== Orbital launch statistics ==
=== By country ===
For the purposes of this section, the yearly tally of orbital launches by country assigns each flight to the country of origin of the rocket, not to the launch services provider or the spaceport.

| Country | Launches | Successes | Failures | Partial failures |
|---|---|---|---|---|
| China | 6 | 6 | 0 | 0 |
| France | 5 | 5 | 0 | 0 |
| India | 1 | 0 | 1 | 0 |
| Japan | 6 | 6 | 0 | 0 |
| North Korea | 1 (Note: Disputed) | 0 | 1 | 0 |
| Russia | 22 | 21 | 1 | 0 |
| Ukraine | 8 | 7 | 1 | 0 |
| United States | 18 | 17 | 1 | 0 |
| World | 67 | 62 | 5 | 0 |

=== By rocket ===
- Ariane 5
- Atlas V
- Delta II
- Delta IV
- Delta IV Heavy
- H-IIA
- Long March 2
- Long March 3
- Long March 4
- Minotaur I
- M-V
- Molniya-M
- Soyuz-U
- Soyuz-FG
- Soyuz-2
- Dnepr
- Tsyklon-2
- Space Shuttle
- Proton-K
- Proton-M
- Rokot
- Zenit-3SL
- Others

==== By family ====
| Rocket | Country | Launches | Successes | Failures | Partial failures | Remarks |
|---|---|---|---|---|---|---|
| Ariane | France | 5 | 5 | 0 | 0 | |
| Atlas | United States | 2 | 2 | 0 | 0 | |
| Delta | United States | 9 | 9 | 0 | 0 | |
| Falcon | United States | 1 | 0 | 1 | 0 | Maiden flight |
| GSLV | India | 1 | 0 | 1 | 0 | |
| H-II | Japan | 4 | 4 | 0 | 0 | |
| Long March | China | 6 | 6 | 0 | 0 | |
| Minotaur | United States | 2 | 2 | 0 | 0 | |
| Mu | Japan | 2 | 2 | 0 | 0 | Final flight |
| Pegasus | United States | 1 | 1 | 0 | 0 | |
| R-7 | Russia | 12 | 12 | 0 | 0 | |
| R-14 | Russia | 1 | 1 | 0 | 0 | |
| R-29 | Russia | 1 | 1 | 0 | 0 | |
| R-36 | Ukraine | 3 | 2 | 1 | 0 | |
| Space Shuttle | United States | 3 | 3 | 0 | 0 | |
| Topol | Russia | 1 | 1 | 0 | 0 | |
| Unha | North Korea | 1 | 0 | 1 | 0 | Maiden flight, disputed |
| Universal Rocket | Russia | 7 | 6 | 1 | 0 | |
| Zenit | Ukraine | 5 | 5 | 0 | 0 | |

==== By type ====
| Rocket | Country | Family | Launches | Successes | Failures | Partial failures | Remarks |
|---|---|---|---|---|---|---|---|
| Ariane 5 | France | Ariane | 5 | 5 | 0 | 0 | |
| Atlas V | United States | Atlas | 2 | 2 | 0 | 0 | |
| Delta II | United States | Delta | 6 | 6 | 0 | 0 | |
| Delta IV | United States | Delta | 3 | 3 | 0 | 0 | |
| Dnepr | Ukraine | R-36 | 2 | 1 | 1 | 0 | |
| Falcon 1 | United States | Falcon | 1 | 0 | 1 | 0 | Maiden flight |
| GSLV | India | GSLV | 1 | 0 | 1 | 0 | |
| H-IIA | Japan | H-II | 4 | 4 | 0 | 0 | |
| Kosmos | Russia | R-12/R-14 | 1 | 1 | 0 | 0 | |
| Long March 2 | China | Long March | 1 | 1 | 0 | 0 | |
| Long March 3 | China | Long March | 3 | 3 | 0 | 0 | |
| Long March 4 | China | Long March | 2 | 2 | 0 | 0 | |
| M-V | Japan | Mu | 2 | 2 | 0 | 0 | Final flight |
| Minotaur I | United States | Minotaur | 2 | 2 | 0 | 0 | |
| Molniya | Russia | R-7 | 1 | 1 | 0 | 0 | |
| Pegasus | United States | Pegasus | 1 | 1 | 0 | 0 | |
| Proton | Russia | Universal Rocket | 6 | 5 | 1 | 0 | |
| Shtil' | Russia | R-29 | 1 | 1 | 0 | 0 | |
| Soyuz | Russia | R-7 | 8 | 8 | 0 | 0 | |
| Soyuz-2 | Russia | R-7 | 3 | 3 | 0 | 0 | |
| Space Shuttle | United States | Space Shuttle | 3 | 3 | 0 | 0 | |
| Start-1 | Russia | Topol | 1 | 1 | 0 | 0 | |
| Tsyklon | Ukraine | R-36 | 1 | 1 | 0 | 0 | |
| Unha | North Korea | Unha | 1 | 0 | 1 | 0 | Maiden flight, disputed |
| UR-100 | Russia | Universal Rocket | 1 | 1 | 0 | 0 | |
| Zenit | Ukraine | Zenit | 5 | 5 | 0 | 0 | |

==== By configuration ====
| Rocket | Country | Type | Launches | Successes | Failures | Partial failures | Remarks |
|---|---|---|---|---|---|---|---|
| Ariane 5 ECA | France | Ariane 5 | 5 | 5 | 0 | 0 | |
| Atlas V 411 | United States | Atlas V | 1 | 1 | 0 | 0 | Maiden flight |
| Atlas V 551 | United States | Atlas V | 1 | 1 | 0 | 0 | Maiden flight |
| Delta II 7420 | United States | Delta II | 1 | 1 | 0 | 0 | |
| Delta II 7920 | United States | Delta II | 1 | 1 | 0 | 0 | |
| Delta II 7925 | United States | Delta II | 4 | 4 | 0 | 0 | |
| Delta IV M | United States | Delta IV | 1 | 1 | 0 | 0 | Final flight |
| Delta IV M+ (4,2) | United States | Delta IV | 2 | 2 | 0 | 0 | |
| Dnepr | Ukraine | Dnepr | 2 | 1 | 1 | 0 | |
| Falcon 1 | United States | Falcon 1 | 1 | 0 | 1 | 0 | Maiden flight |
| GSLV Mk I | India | GSLV | 1 | 0 | 1 | 0 | |
| H-IIA 202 | Japan | H-IIA | 1 | 1 | 0 | 0 | |
| H-IIA 204 | Japan | H-IIA | 1 | 1 | 0 | 0 | Maiden flight |
| H-IIA 2022 | Japan | H-IIA | 1 | 1 | 0 | 0 | |
| H-IIA 2024 | Japan | H-IIA | 1 | 1 | 0 | 0 | |
| Kosmos-3M | Russia | Kosmos | 1 | 1 | 0 | 0 | |
| Long March 2C | China | Long March 2 | 1 | 1 | 0 | 0 | |
| Long March 3A | China | Long March 3 | 2 | 2 | 0 | 0 | |
| Long March 3B | China | Long March 3 | 1 | 1 | 0 | 0 | |
| Long March 4B | China | Long March 4 | 1 | 1 | 0 | 0 | |
| Long March 4B-II | China | Long March 4 | 1 | 1 | 0 | 0 | Maiden flight, later Long March 4C |
| M-V | Japan | M-V | 2 | 2 | 0 | 0 | Final flight |
| Minotaur I | United States | Minotaur I | 2 | 2 | 0 | 0 | |
| Molniya-M / 2BL | Russia | Molniya | 1 | 1 | 0 | 0 | |
| Pegasus-XL | United States | Pegasus | 1 | 1 | 0 | 0 | |
| Proton-K / DM-2 | Russia | Proton | 1 | 1 | 0 | 0 | |
| Proton-K / DM-3 | Russia | Proton | 1 | 1 | 0 | 0 | |
| Proton-M / Briz-M | Russia | Proton | 4 | 3 | 1 | 0 | |
| Rokot / Briz-KM | Russia | UR-100 | 1 | 1 | 0 | 0 | |
| Shtil' | Russia | Shtil' | 1 | 1 | 0 | 0 | |
| Soyuz-2.1a / Fregat | Russia | Soyuz-2 | 2 | 2 | 0 | 0 | Maiden flight, first orbital launch of Soyuz-2 |
| Soyuz-2.1b / Fregat | Russia | Soyuz-2 | 1 | 1 | 0 | 0 | Maiden flight of Soyuz-2.1b |
| Soyuz-FG | Russia | Soyuz | 2 | 2 | 0 | 0 | |
| Soyuz-U | Russia | Soyuz | 6 | 6 | 0 | 0 | |
| Space Shuttle | United States | Space Shuttle | 3 | 3 | 0 | 0 | |
| Start-1 | Russia | Start-1 | 1 | 1 | 0 | 0 | |
| Tsyklon-2 | Ukraine | Tsyklon | 1 | 1 | 0 | 0 | Final flight |
| Unha | North Korea | Unha | 1 | 0 | 1 | 0 | Maiden flight, disputed |
| Zenit-3SL | Ukraine | Zenit | 5 | 5 | 0 | 0 | |

=== By launch site ===
- Jiuquan
- Taiyuan
- Xichang
- Kourou
- Satish Dhawan
- Ocean Odyssey
- Tanegashima
- Uchinoura
- Baikonur
- Kwajalein
- Tonghae
- Barents Sea
- Dombarovsky
- Plesetsk
- Svobodny
- Cape Canaveral
- Kennedy
- MARS
- Vandenberg

| Site | Country | Launches | Successes | Failures | Partial failures | Remarks |
|---|---|---|---|---|---|---|
| Baikonur | Kazakhstan | 17 | 15 | 2 | 0 | |
| Barents | Russia | 1 | 1 | 0 | 0 | Launched from Ekaterinburg submarine |
| Cape Canaveral | United States | 7 | 7 | 0 | 0 | |
| Dombarovsky | Russia | 1 | 1 | 0 | 0 | First launch |
| Jiuquan | China | 1 | 1 | 0 | 0 | |
| Kennedy | United States | 3 | 3 | 0 | 0 | |
| Kwajalein | Marshall Islands | 1 | 0 | 1 | 0 | |
| Kourou | France | 5 | 5 | 0 | 0 | |
| MARS | United States | 1 | 1 | 0 | 0 | First launch |
| Ocean Odyssey | (United Nations) International | 5 | 5 | 0 | 0 | |
| Plesetsk | Russia | 5 | 5 | 0 | 0 | |
| Satish Dhawan | India | 1 | 0 | 1 | 0 | |
| Svobodny | Russia | 1 | 1 | 0 | 0 | Final launch |
| Taiyuan | China | 2 | 2 | 0 | 0 | |
| Tanegashima | Japan | 4 | 4 | 0 | 0 | |
| Tonghae | North Korea | 1 | 0 | 1 | 0 | |
| Uchinoura | Japan | 2 | 2 | 0 | 0 | |
| Vandenberg | United States | 6 | 6 | 0 | 0 | One launch used Stargazer aircraft |
| Xichang | China | 3 | 3 | 0 | 0 | |
| Total | | 67 | 62 | 5 | 0 | |

=== By orbit ===
- Transatmospheric
- Low Earth
- Low Earth (ISS)
- Low Earth (SSO)
- Low Earth (retrograde)
- Medium Earth
- Geosychronous
  (transfer)
- Inclined GSO
- High Earth
- Heliocentric
- Solar escape

| Orbital regime | Launches | Successes | Failures | Accidentally achieved | Remarks |
|---|---|---|---|---|---|
| Transatmospheric | 0 | 0 | 0 | 0 | |
| Low Earth | 35 | 32 | 3 | 0 | 8 to ISS |
| Medium Earth / Molniya | 6 | 6 | 0 | 1 | |
| Geosynchronous / GTO | 24 | 22 | 2 | 0 | |
| High Earth / Lunar transfer | 0 | 0 | 0 | 0 | |
| Heliocentric / Planetary transfer | 1 | 1 | 0 | 0 | |
| Solar escape | 1 | 1 | 0 | 0 | |
| Total | 67 | 62 | 5 | 1 | |
