= 2005 in spaceflight =

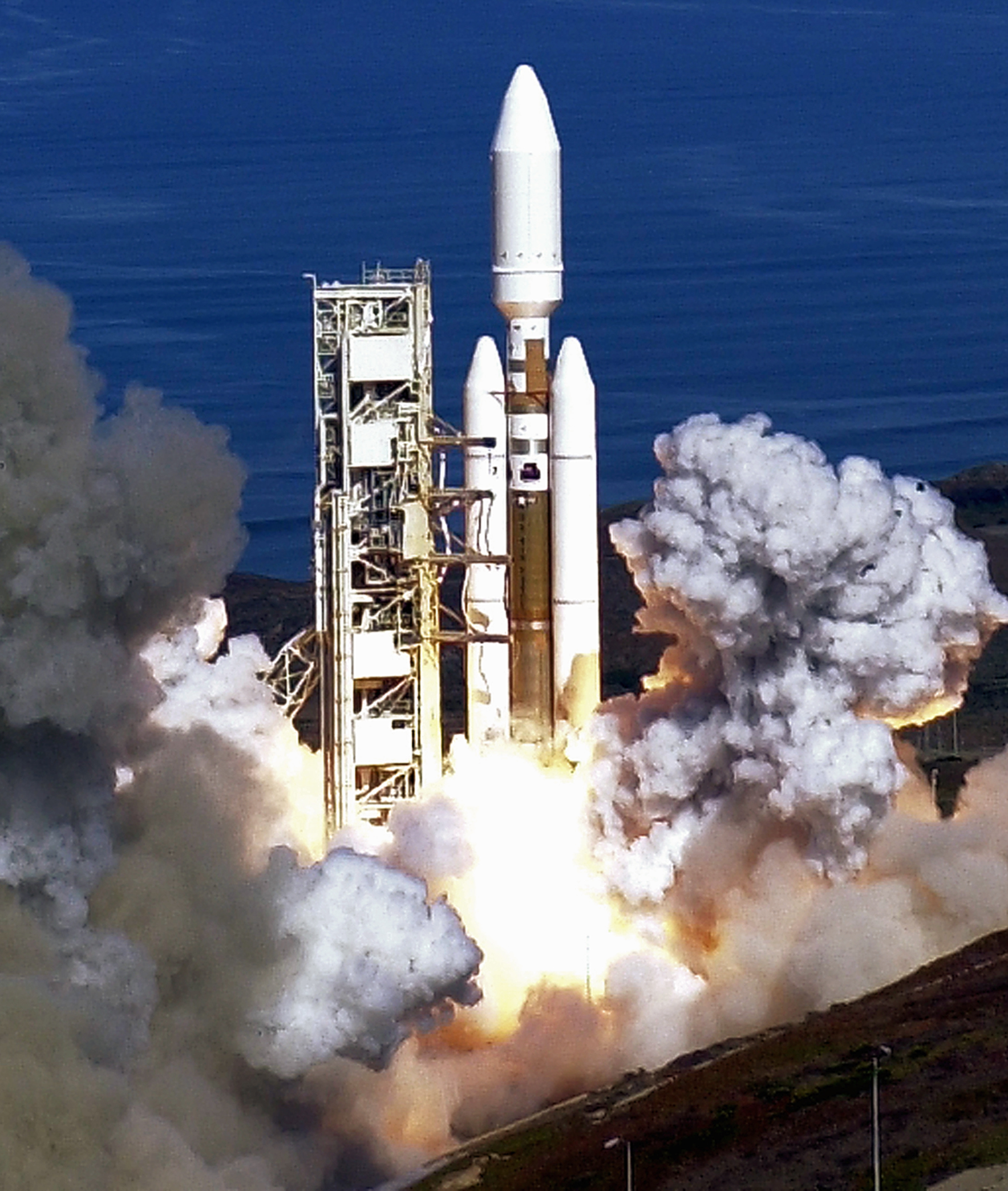
- Launch of the last Titan rocket, a Titan IVB, from Vandenberg SLC-4E

Orbital launches
- First: 12 January
- Last: 29 December
- Total: 55
- Successes: 52
- Failures: 3
- Partial failures: 0
- Catalogued: 52

National firsts
- Satellite: Iran

Rockets
- Maiden flights: Ariane 5GS; Atlas V 431; H-IIA 2022
- Retirements: Atlas IIIB; Titan IVB

Crewed flights
- Orbital: 4
- Total travellers: 15

2005 in spaceflight

This article outlines notable events occurring in 2005 in spaceflight, including major launches and EVAs. 2005 saw Iran launch its first satellite.

== Orbital launches ==
- ← Jan
- Feb
- Mar
- Apr
- May
- Jun
- Jul
- Aug
- Sep
- Oct
- Nov
- Dec →

Date and time (UTC)	Rocket	Flight number	Launch site		LSP	
Date and time (UTC)	Payload (⚀ = CubeSat)	Operator	Orbit	Function	Decay (UTC)	Outcome
Date and time (UTC)	Remarks					
=== January ===
12 January; 18:47:08	(United States) Delta II 7925		(United States) Cape Canaveral SLC-17B		(United States) Boeing IDS	
12 January; 18:47:08	(United States) Deep Impact	NASA	Heliocentric	Comet flyby	In orbit	Successful
12 January; 18:47:08	(United States) Deep Impact impactor	NASA	Heliocentric	Comet impactor	4 July; 05:52	Successful
12 January; 18:47:08	Visited 9P/Tempel. Impactor impacted comet to test composition, main probe subsequently reused for EPOXI mission to study extrasolar planets and conduct a flyby of comet 103P/Hartley. Stardust-NExT mission will fly past comet to inspect the crater caused by the impactor, as debris thrown up prevented Deep Impact from doing so.					
20 January; 03:00:07	(Russia) Kosmos-3M		(Russia) Plesetsk Site 132/1		(Russia)	
20 January; 03:00:07	(Russia) Kosmos 2414 (Parus)		Low Earth	Navigation	In orbit	Operational
20 January; 03:00:07	(Russia) Universitetsky-Tatyana (RS-23)	MGU	Low Earth	Technology	In orbit	Successful
20 January; 03:00:07	Universitetsky-Tatyana ceased operations at around 21:00 UTC on 6 March 2007					
=== February ===
3 February; 02:27:32	(Russia) Proton-M/Briz-M		(Kazakhstan) Baikonur Site 81/24		(Russia) (United States) International Launch Services	
3 February; 02:27:32	(United States) AMC-12 (WORLDSAT 2)	SES Americom	Geosynchronous	Communication	In orbit	Operational
3 February; 07:41	(United States) Atlas IIIB		(United States) Cape Canaveral SLC-36B		(Russia) (United States) International Launch Services	
3 February; 07:41	(United States) USA-181 (NOSS-3 F3A)	NRO	Low Earth	ELINT	In orbit	Operational
3 February; 07:41	(United States) USA-181 (NOSS-3 F3B)	NRO	Low Earth	ELINT	In orbit	Operational
3 February; 07:41	NRO Launch 23 "Canis Minor", final flight of Atlas IIIB					
12 February; 21:03:01	(France) Ariane 5ECA		(France) Kourou ELA-3		(France) Arianespace	
12 February; 21:03:01	(United States) XTAR-EUR	XTAR	Geosynchronous	Communication	In orbit	Operational
12 February; 21:03:01	(France) Maqsat-B2	Arianespace	Geosynchronous transfer	Technology	3 December 2012	Successful
12 February; 21:03:01	(Netherlands) Sloshsat-FLEVO	SRON	Geosynchronous transfer	Microgravity	In orbit	Successful
12 February; 21:03:01	Sloshsat-FLEVO deployed from Maqsat-B2					
26 February; 09:25	(Japan) H-IIA 2022		(Japan) Tanegashima LA-Y1		(Japan) JAXA	
26 February; 09:25	(Japan) Himawari 6 (MTSAT 1R)	MLIT/JMA	Geosynchronous	ATC/Weather	In orbit	Operational
26 February; 09:25	Maiden flight of H-IIA 2022					
28 February; 19:09:18	(Russia) Soyuz-U		(Kazakhstan) Baikonur Site 1/5		(Russia) Roskosmos	
28 February; 19:09:18	(Russia) Progress M-52	Roskosmos	Low Earth (ISS)	Logistics	16 June; 00:02	Successful
28 February; 19:09:18	(Russia) TNS-0	RNII KP	Low Earth	Technology	30 August	Successful
28 February; 19:09:18	ISS flight 17P, TNS-0 deployed from the International Space Station at 08:30 UTC on 28 March, during an EVA					
=== March ===
1 March; 03:50:59	(Ukraine) Zenit-3SL		(Norway) Ocean Odyssey		(United Nations) Sea Launch	
1 March; 03:50:59	(United States) XM-3 "Rhythm"	XM	Geosynchronous	Communications	In orbit	Operational
11 March; 21:42	(United States) Atlas V 431		(United States) Cape Canaveral SLC-41		(Russia) (United States) International Launch Services	
11 March; 21:42	(United Kingdom) Inmarsat-4 F1	Inmarsat	Geosynchronous	Communications	In orbit	Operational
11 March; 21:42	Maiden flight of Atlas V 431					
29 March; 22:31L00	(Russia) Proton-K/DM-2M		(Kazakhstan) Baikonur Site 200/39		(Russia) VKS	
29 March; 22:31L00	(Russia) Ekspress AM-2	RSCC	Geosynchronous	Communications	In orbit	Operational
=== April ===
11 April; 13:35	(United States) Minotaur I		(United States) Vandenberg SLC-8		(United States) Orbital Sciences	
11 April; 13:35	(United States) USA-165 (XSS-11)	USAFRL	Low Earth	Technology	11 November 2013	Successful
12 April; 12:00	(China) Long March 3B		(China) Xichang LA-2		(China) CASC	
12 April; 12:00	(China) Apstar VI	APT	Geosynchronous	Communications	In orbit	Operational
15 April; 00:46:25	(Russia) Soyuz-FG		(Kazakhstan) Baikonur Site 1/5		(Russia) Roskosmos	
15 April; 00:46:25	(Russia) Soyuz TMA-6	Roskosmos	Low Earth (ISS)	Expedition 11	11 October; 01:09:00	Successful
15 April; 00:46:25	Crewed orbital flight with 3 cosmonauts					
15 April; 17:26:50	(United States) Pegasus-XL		(United States) Stargazer, Vandenberg		(United States) Orbital Sciences	
15 April; 17:26:50	(United States) DART	NASA	Low Earth	Technology	7 May 2016; 08:32	Spacecraft failure
15 April; 17:26:50	Rendezvous with MUBLCOM communications satellite failed due to navigation malfunction which led to satellites colliding in orbit. Deactivated eleven hours after launch.					
26 April; 07:31:29	(Ukraine) Zenit-3SL		(Norway) Ocean Odyssey		(United Nations) Sea Launch	
26 April; 07:31:29	(United States) Spaceway 1	DirecTV	Geosynchronous	Communications	In orbit	Operational
30 April; 00:50	(United States) Titan IV(405)B		(United States) Cape Canaveral SLC-40		(United States) Lockheed Martin	
30 April; 00:50	(United States) USA-182 (Lacrosse 5)	NRO	Low Earth	Radar imaging	In orbit	Operational
30 April; 00:50	NRO Launch 16, final Titan launch from Cape Canaveral					
=== May ===
5 May; 04:45	(India) PSLV		(India) Satish Dhawan SLP		(India) ISRO	
5 May; 04:45	(India) CARTOSAT-1	ISRO	Sun-synchronous	Remote sensing	In orbit	Operational
5 May; 04:45	(India) HAMSAT (VUSat-Oscar 52)	AMSAT-India	Sun-synchronous	Amateur radio	In orbit	Operational
20 May; 10:22:01	(United States) Delta II 7320		(United States) Vandenberg SLC-2W		(United States) Boeing IDS	
20 May; 10:22:01	(United States) NOAA-18 (NOAA-N)	NOAA	Sun-synchronous	Weather	In orbit	Operational
22 May; 17:59:08	(Russia) Proton-M/Briz-M		(Kazakhstan) Baikonur Site 200/39		(Russia) (United States) International Launch Services	
22 May; 17:59:08	(United States) DirecTV-8	DirecTV	Geosynchronous	Communications	In orbit	Operational
31 May; 12:00	(Russia) Soyuz-U		(Kazakhstan) Baikonur Site 1/5		(Russia) Roskosmos	
31 May; 12:00	(Russia) Foton-M2	Roskosmos/ESA	Low Earth	Microgravity	16 June	Successful
31 May; 12:00	Recovered intact					
=== June ===
16 June; 23:09:34	(Russia) Soyuz-U		(Kazakhstan) Baikonur Site 1/5		(Russia) Roskosmos	
16 June; 23:09:34	(Russia) Progress M-53	Roskosmos	Low Earth (ISS)	Logistics	7 September; 14:12:40	Successful
16 June; 23:09:34	ISS flight 18P					
21 June; 00:49:37	(Russia) Molniya-M/ML		(Russia) Plesetsk Site 16/2		(Russia) VKS	
21 June; 00:49:37	(Russia) Molniya-3K #12L	VKS	Intended: Molniya	Communications	+6 minutes	Launch failure
21 June; 00:49:37	Failed to achieve orbit following third stage malfunction					
21 June; 19:46:09	(Russia) Volna		(Russia) K-496 Borisoglebsk, Barents Sea		(Russia) VMF	
21 June; 19:46:09	(United States) Cosmos 1	Planetary Society	Intended: Low Earth	Technology	21 June	Launch failure
21 June; 19:46:09	Experimental solar sail, first stage engine failure 83 seconds after launch					
23 June; 14:03:00	(Ukraine) Zenit-3SL		(Norway) Ocean Odyssey		(United Nations) Sea Launch	
23 June; 14:03:00	(United Nations) Intelsat Americas 8 (2005–2007); Galaxy 28 (2007—)	Intelsat	Geosynchronous	Communications	In orbit	Operational
23 June; 14:03:00	Originally ordered as Telstar 8 for Loral Space & Communications, sold to Intelsat before launch					
24 June; 19:41:00	(Russia) Proton-K/DM-2		(Kazakhstan) Baikonur Site 200/39		(Russia) VKS	
24 June; 19:41:00	(Russia) Ekspress AM-3	RSCC	Geosynchronous	Communications	In orbit	Operational
=== July ===
5 July; 22:40	(China) Long March 2D		(China) Jiuquan LA-4/SLS-1		(China) CASC	
5 July; 22:40	(China) Shijian 7	CASC	Low Earth	Scientific	In orbit	Operational
10 July; 03:30	(Japan) M-V		(Japan) Uchinoura		(Japan) JAXA	
10 July; 03:30	(Japan) Suzaku (ASTRO-EII)	JAXA	Low Earth	X-ray astronomy	5 January 2025	Successful
26 July; 14:39:00	(United States) Space Shuttle Discovery		(United States) Kennedy LC-39B		(United States) United Space Alliance	
26 July; 14:39:00	(United States) STS-114	NASA	Low Earth (ISS)	ISS assembly	9 August; 12:11:22	Successful
26 July; 14:39:00	(Italy) (United States) Raffaello MPLM	ASI/NASA	Low Earth (ISS)	Logistics	9 August; 12:11:22	Successful
26 July; 14:39:00	Crewed orbital flight with seven astronauts, first Return to Flight mission after Columbia accident, Orbiter required repairs whilst in orbit.					
=== August ===
2 August; 07:30	(China) Long March 2C		(China) Jiuquan		(China) CNSA	
2 August; 07:30	(China) FSW-21 (FSW-3 #4)	CNSA	Low Earth	Remote sensing	28 August; 23:38	Successful
2 August; 07:30	Recovered after reentry					
11 August; 08:20:44	(France) Ariane 5GS		(France) Kourou ELA-3		(France) Arianespace	
11 August; 08:20:44	(Thailand) Thaicom 4 (iPSTAR)	Shin Satellite	Geosynchronous	Communications	In orbit	Operational
11 August; 08:20:44	Maiden flight of Ariane 5GS					
12 August; 11:43:00	(United States) Atlas V 401		(United States) Cape Canaveral SLC-41		(Russia) (United States) International Launch Services	
12 August; 11:43:00	(United States) Mars Reconnaissance Orbiter	NASA	Areocentric	Mars orbiter	In orbit	Operational
13 August; 23:28:26	(Russia) Soyuz-FG/Fregat		(Kazakhstan) Baikonur Site 31/6		(France) (Russia) Starsem	
13 August; 23:28:26	(United States) Galaxy 14	PanAmSat (2005–2006); Intelsat (2006—)	Geosynchronous	Communications	In orbit	Operational
23 August; 21:09:59	(Ukraine) Dnepr		(Kazakhstan) Baikonur Site 109/95		(Russia) ISC Kosmotras	
23 August; 21:09:59	(Japan) Kirari (OICETS)	JAXA	Low Earth	Technology	In orbit	Successful
23 August; 21:09:59	(Japan) Reimei (INDEX)	JAXA	Low Earth	Technology	In orbit	Operational
23 August; 21:09:59	Kirari deactivated on 24 September 2009					
26 August; 18:34:28	(Russia) Rokot / Briz-KM		(Russia) Plesetsk Site 133/3		(Russia) VKS	
26 August; 18:34:28	(Russia) Monitor-E	Roscosmos	Low Earth (SSO)	Earth observation	22 September 2020; 00:00	Successful
26 August; 18:34:28	Control issues shortly after launch, resolved within a few months.					
29 August; 18:45	(China) Long March 2D		(China) Jiuquan LA-4		(China) CASC	
29 August; 18:45	(China) FSW-22 (FSW-3 #5)	CNSA	Low Earth	Reconnaissance	17 October	Successful
=== September ===
2 September; 09:50	(Russia) Soyuz-U		(Kazakhstan) Baikonur Site 31/6		(Russia) VKS	
2 September; 09:50	(Russia) Kosmos 2415 (Yantar-1KFT/Kometa)	VKS	Low Earth	Optical imaging	15 October; 21:44	Successful
2 September; 09:50	1,700th launch of R-7 derived rocket, film capsule and camera recovered after reentry					
8 September; 13:07:54	(Russia) Soyuz-U		(Kazakhstan) Baikonur Site 1/5		(Russia) Roskosmos	
8 September; 13:07:54	(Russia) Progress M-54	Roskosmos	Low Earth (ISS)	Logistics	3 March 2006; 13:05	Successful
8 September; 13:07:54	(Russia) (United States) RadioSkaf (SuitSat/AO-54)	AMSAT	Low Earth	Amateur radio	7 September 2006; 16:00	Partial spacecraft failure
8 September; 13:07:54	ISS flight 19P. RadioSkaf integrated into Orlan-M No. 14 to form SuitSat, which was deployed from the ISS at 23:05 UTC on 3 February 2006, during an EVA. SuitSat transmissions significantly weaker than expected.					
8 September; 21:53:40	(Russia) Proton-M/Briz-M		(Kazakhstan) Baikonur Site 200/39		(Russia) (United States) International Launch Services	
8 September; 21:53:40	(Canada) Anik F1R	Telesat	Geosynchronous	Communications	In orbit	Operational
23 September; 02:24:29	(United States) Minotaur I		(United States) Vandenberg SLC-8		(United States) Orbital Sciences	
23 September; 02:24:29	(United States) USA-185 (STP-R1/Streak)	DARPA	Low Earth	Technology	In orbit	Operational
26 September; 03:37:00	(United States) Delta II 7925-9.5		(United States) Cape Canaveral SLC-17A		(United States) Boeing IDS	
26 September; 03:37:00	(United States) USA-183 (GPS IIR-14/M1)	US Air Force	Medium Earth	Navigation	In orbit	Operational
=== October ===
1 October; 03:54:53	(Russia) Soyuz-FG		(Kazakhstan) Baikonur Site 1/5		(Russia) Roskosmos	
1 October; 03:54:53	(Russia) Soyuz TMA-7	Roskosmos	Low Earth (ISS)	Expedition 12	8 April 2006; 23:48	Successful
1 October; 03:54:53	Crewed orbital flight with three cosmonauts					
8 October; 15:02:00	(Russia) Rokot/Briz-KM		(Russia) Plesetsk Site 133/3		(France) (Russia) Eurockot	
8 October; 15:02:00	CryoSat	ESA	Intended: Low Earth	Environmental	8 October	Launch failure
8 October; 15:02:00	Second stage failed to shut down and separate, failed to orbit.					
12 October; 01:00	(China) Long March 2F		(China) Jiuquan LA-4/SLS-1		(China) CALT	
12 October; 01:00	(China) Shenzhou 6	CMSA	Low Earth	Technology/Biological	16 October; 04:32:50	Successful
12 October; 01:00	Carried two crewmembers, first Chinese spaceflight with multiple crew					
13 October; 22:32:00	(France) Ariane 5GS		(France) Kourou ELA-3		(France) Arianespace	
13 October; 22:32:00	(France) Syracuse 3A	DGA	Geosynchronous	Communications	In orbit	Operational
13 October; 22:32:00	(United States) Galaxy 15	PanAmSat (2005–2006); Intelsat (2006—)	Geosynchronous	Communications	In orbit	Spacecraft failure
19 October; 18:05	(United States) Titan IV(404)B		(United States) Vandenberg SLC-4E		(United States) Lockheed Martin	
19 October; 18:05	(United States) USA-186 (Improved Crystal)	NRO	Low Earth	Reconnaissance	In orbit	Operational
19 October; 18:05	NRO Launch 20, Final flight of Titan IVB and the Titan family of rockets.					
27 October; 06:52:26	(Russia) Kosmos-3M		(Russia) Plesetsk Site 132/1		(Russia) NPO Polyot	
27 October; 06:52:26	Beijing-1 (China-DMC+4)	Tsinghua	Low Earth	Optical imaging	In orbit	Operational
27 October; 06:52:26	(United Kingdom) TopSat	MoD	Low Earth	Optical imaging	In orbit	Operational
27 October; 06:52:26	(Iran) Sinah-1	ISA	Low Earth	Remote sensing	In orbit	Operational
27 October; 06:52:26	SSETI Express (XO-53)	SSETI/ESA	Low Earth	Technology, CubeSat deployer	In orbit	Spacecraft failure
27 October; 06:52:26	⚀ (Japan) CubeSat XI-V (CO-58)	University of Tokyo	Low Earth	Technology	In orbit	Operational
27 October; 06:52:26	⚀ (Germany) UWE-1	UWE	Low Earth	Technology	In orbit	Successful
27 October; 06:52:26	⚀ (Norway) nCUBE-2	NSSP	Low Earth	Amateur radio	In orbit	Spacecraft failure
27 October; 06:52:26	(Russia) Mozhaets-5 (RS-25)	Mozhaiskiy/NPO PM	Low Earth	Technology; Amateur radio	In orbit	Spacecraft failure
27 October; 06:52:26	(Germany) Rubin-5-ASOLANT	OHB System/AATiS	Low Earth	Technology	In orbit	Successful
27 October; 06:52:26	Sinah-1 was the first Iranian satellite, SSETI Express lost due to power failure twelve and a half hours after launch as solar arrays were unable to recharge batteries; Mozhaets 5 failed to separate from the carrier rocket, NCUBE-2 failed to contact the ground and Rubin-5 remained intentionally attached to the carrier rocket. UWE-1 operated until 17 November.					
=== November ===
8 November; 14:06:59	(Ukraine) Zenit-3SL		(Norway) Ocean Odyssey		(United Nations) Sea Launch	
8 November; 14:06:59	(United Kingdom) Inmarsat-4 F2	Inmarsat	Geosynchronous	Communications	In orbit	Operational
9 November; 03:33:34	(Russia) Soyuz-FG / Fregat		(Kazakhstan) Baikonur Site 31/6		(France) (Russia) Starsem	
9 November; 03:33:34	Venus Express	ESA	Cytherocentric	Venus orbiter	Late January 2015	Successful
16 November; 23:46:00	(France) Ariane 5 ECA		(France) Kourou ELA-3		(France) Arianespace	
16 November; 23:46:00	(United States) Spaceway-2	DirecTV	Geosynchronous	Communications	In orbit	Operational
16 November; 23:46:00	(Indonesia) Telkom-2	PT Telkom	Geosynchronous	Communications	In orbit	Successful
=== December ===
21 December; 18:38:20	(Russia) Soyuz-U		(Kazakhstan) Baikonur Site 1/5		(Russia) Roskosmos	
21 December; 18:38:20	(Russia) Progress M-55	Roskomsos	Low Earth (ISS)	Logistics	19 June 2006; 17:53	Successful
21 December; 18:38:20	ISS flight 20P					
21 December; 19:34:20	(Russia) Kosmos-3M		(Russia) Plesetsk Site 132/1		(Russia) VKS	
21 December; 19:34:20	(Russia) Gonets-M No.1	Gonets Satellite System	Low Earth	Communications	In orbit	Operational
21 December; 19:34:20	(Russia) Kosmos 2416 (Rodnik)	VKS	Low Earth	Communications	In orbit	Operational
21 December; 22:33	(France) Ariane 5GS		(France) Kourou ELA-3		(France) Arianespace	
21 December; 22:33	Meteosat-9 (MSG-2)	Eumetsat	Geosynchronous	Weather	In orbit	Operational
21 December; 22:33	(India) INSAT-4A	ISRO	Geosynchronous	Communications	In orbit	Operational
25 December; 05:07:10	(Russia) Proton-K/DM-2		(Kazakhstan) Baikonur Site 81/24		(Russia) VKS	
25 December; 05:07:10	(Russia) Kosmos 2417 (GLONASS-M)	VKS	Medium Earth	Navigation	In orbit	Operational
25 December; 05:07:10	(Russia) Kosmos 2418 (GLONASS-M)	VKS	Medium Earth	Navigation	In orbit	Operational
25 December; 05:07:10	(Russia) Kosmos 2419 (GLONASS)	VKS	Medium Earth	Navigation	In orbit	Operational
28 December; 05:19	(Russia) Soyuz-FG/Fregat		(Kazakhstan) Baikonur Site 31/6		(France) (Russia) Starsem	
28 December; 05:19	GIOVE A	ESA	Medium Earth	Navigation; Technology	In orbit	Successful
28 December; 05:19	The satellite was deactivated on 24 November 2021.					
29 December; 02:28	(Russia) Proton-M/Briz-M		(Kazakhstan) Baikonur Site 200/39		(Russia) (United States) International Launch Services	
29 December; 02:28	(United States) AMC-23 (2005–2007); GE-23 (2007—)	SES Americom (2005–2007); SAT-GE (2007—)	Geosynchronous	Communication	In orbit	Operational
29 December; 02:28	Originally ordered by GE Americom as GE-2i, transferred to SES Americom before launch and renamed AMC-13, then transferred to Worldsat as Worldsat-3 before being transferred back to SES Americom as AMC-23 in early 2005. Transferred to SAT-GE when it split from SES Americom in 2007.					

- ← Jan
- Feb
- Mar
- Apr
- May
- Jun
- Jul
- Aug
- Sep
- Oct
- Nov
- Dec →

== Suborbital launches ==
- ← Jan
- Feb
- Mar
- Apr
- May
- Jun
- Jul
- Aug
- Sep
- Oct
- Nov
- Dec →

Date and time (UTC)	Rocket	Flight number	Launch site		LSP	
Date and time (UTC)	Payload (⚀ = CubeSat)	Operator	Orbit	Function	Decay (UTC)	Outcome
Date and time (UTC)	Remarks					
=== January ===
18 January; 13:58:00	(United States) Super Loki		(Norway) Andøya		(Germany) DLR	
18 January; 13:58:00	(Germany) ROMA 2005 RWCH05	DLR	Suborbital	Weather	18 January	Successful
18 January; 16:07	(United States) Super Loki		(Norway) Andøya		(Germany) DLR	
18 January; 16:07	(Germany) ROMA 2005 RWCH08	DLR	Suborbital	Weather	18 January	Successful
18 January; 17:57	(United States) Super Loki		(Norway) Andøya		(Germany) DLR	
18 January; 17:57	(Germany) ROMA 2005 RWCH11	DLR	Suborbital	Weather	18 January	Successful
20 January; 09:16	(United States) Super Loki		(Norway) Andøya		(Germany) DLR	
20 January; 09:16	(Germany) ROMA 2005 RWCH14	DLR	Suborbital	Weather	18 January	Successful
=== February ===
1 February	(France) M45		(France) Biscarosse		(France) French Navy	
1 February		French Navy	Suborbital	Missile test	1 February	Successful
1 February	Apogee: 800 kilometres (500 mi)					
2 February; 20:57:00	(United States) Terrier-Orion		(United States) Barking Sands		(United States) NASA	
2 February; 20:57:00		NAWC	Suborbital	Target	2 February	Successful
2 February; 20:57:00	Apogee: 130 kilometres (81 mi)					
14 February; 06:22	(United States) UGM-27 Polaris (STARS)		(United States) Kodiak		(United States) SMDC	
14 February; 06:22	(United States) IFT-14 Target	MDA	Suborbital	Target	14 February	Successful
14 February; 06:22	Apogee: 1,000 kilometres (620 mi), interceptor launch cancelled					
24 February; 21:03	(United States) Aries		(United States) Barking Sands		(United States) US Navy	
24 February; 21:03	(United States) FTM-04-1 Target	MDA	Suborbital	Target	24 February	Successful
24 February; 21:03	Apogee: 150 kilometres (93 mi), intercepted by SM-3					
24 February; 21:04	(United States) RIM-161 Standard Missile 3		(United States) USS Lake Erie		(United States) MDA	
24 February; 21:04	(United States) FTM-04-1 Interceptor	MDA	Suborbital	Aegis test	24 February	Successful
24 February; 21:04	"Stellar Dragon", apogee: 150 kilometres (93 mi), intercepted Aries					
=== March ===
1 March; 23:13:00	(United States) Terrier-Orion		(United States) Barking Sands		(United States) NASA	
1 March; 23:13:00		NAWC	Suborbital	Target	1 March	Successful
1 March; 23:13:00	Apogee: 130 kilometres (81 mi)					
2 March; 04:00:14	(United States) UGM-133 Trident II D5		(United States) USS Tennessee, ETR LP-5		(United States) US Navy	
2 March; 04:00:14		US Navy	Suborbital	Missile test	2 March	Successful
2 March; 04:00:14	Apogee: 1,000 kilometres (620 mi), FCET-33					
2 March; 05:09:16	(United States) UGM-133 Trident II D5		(United States) USS Tennessee, ETR LP-5		(United States) US Navy	
2 March; 05:09:16		US Navy	Suborbital	Missile test	2 March	Successful
2 March; 05:09:16	Apogee: 1,000 kilometres (620 mi), FCET-33					
2 March; 21:11:00	(United States) Terrier-Orion		(United States) Barking Sands		(United States) NASA	
2 March; 21:11:00		NAWC	Suborbital	Target	2 March	Successful
2 March; 21:11:00	Apogee: 130 kilometres (81 mi)					
2 March; 22:05:00	(United States) Terrier-Oriole		(United States) Barking Sands		(United States) NASA	
2 March; 22:05:00		NAWC	Suborbital	Target	2 March	Successful
2 March; 22:05:00	Apogee: 300 kilometres (190 mi)					
6 March; 10:31:17	(Canada) Black Brant XII		(United States) Poker Flat LC-4		(United States) NASA	
6 March; 10:31:17	(United States) CASCADES	Dartmouth	Intended: Suborbital	Auroral	6 March	Launch failure
6 March; 10:31:17	Third stage failed to ignite, apogee: 29 kilometres (18 mi)					
15 March; 05:45:00	(United States) Improved Orion		(United States) Poker Flat LC-3		(United States) NASA	
15 March; 05:45:00	(United States) DUST	Dartmouth	Suborbital	Micrometeoroids	15 March	Successful
15 March; 05:45:00	Apogee: 105 kilometres (65 mi)					
15 March; 07:45:00	(United States) Improved Orion		(United States) Poker Flat LC-2		(United States) NASA	
15 March; 07:45:00	(United States) DUST	Dartmouth	Suborbital	Micrometeoroids	15 March	Successful
15 March; 07:45:00	Apogee: 105 kilometres (65 mi)					
19 March	(Pakistan) Shaheen-II		(Pakistan) Sonmiani		Army of Pakistan	
19 March		Army of Pakistan	Suborbital	Missile test	19 March	Successful
19 March	Apogee: 300 kilometres (190 mi)					
=== April ===
8 April; 05:56	(India) RH-300 Mk.II		(India) Satish Dhawan		(India) ISRO	
8 April; 05:56		PRL	Suborbital	Aeronomy	8 April	Successful
8 April; 05:56	Apogee: 130 kilometres (81 mi)					
8 April; 17:30	(United States) Castor 4B MRT		(United States) C-17, Pacific Ocean		(United States) Orbital Sciences	
8 April; 17:30		Orbital Sciences	Suborbital	Test flight	8 April	Successful
8 April; 17:30	Apogee: 300 kilometres (190 mi)					
=== May ===
2 May; 05:00	(United Kingdom) Skylark 7		(Sweden) Esrange Skylark Tower		(United Kingdom) Sounding Rocket Services	
2 May; 05:00	Maser-10	ESA	Suborbital	Microgravity	2 May	Successful
2 May; 05:00	Final Skylark launch, apogee: 252 kilometres (157 mi)					
5 May; 09:35:00	(United States) Terrier-Orion		(United States) Wallops		(United States) NASA	
5 May; 09:35:00	(United States) MCAFT-1/IBSi	IBSi	Suborbital	Biological	5 May	Successful
5 May; 09:35:00	Apogee: 156 kilometres (97 mi)					
27 May	(Russia) R-17 Elbrus (B)		(Syria) Minakh		(Syria) Syrian Army	
27 May		Syrian Army	Suborbital	Missile test	27 May	Successful
27 May	Apogee: 100 kilometres (62 mi)					
27 May	(Russia) R-17 Elbrus (D)		(Syria) Minakh		(Syria) Syrian Army	
27 May		Syrian Army	Suborbital	Missile test	27 May	Successful
27 May	Apogee: 100 kilometres (62 mi)					
27 May	(Russia) R-17 Elbrus (D)		(Syria) Minakh		(Syria) Syrian Army	
27 May		Syrian Army	Suborbital	Missile test	27 May	Launch failure
27 May	Disintegrated over Turkey					
=== June ===
12 June	(China) Ju Lang 2		(China) Submarine, Yellow Sea		(China) PLAN	
12 June		PLAN	Suborbital	Missile test	12 June	Successful
28 June; 22:54	(United States) Terrier-ASAS		(United States) Wallops		(United States) NASA	
28 June; 22:54		NASA	Suborbital	Test flight	28 June	Successful
=== July ===
4 July; 08:41	(United States) Improved Orion		(Norway) Andøya		(Norway) FFI	
4 July; 08:41	(Norway) IMEF	Oslo	Suborbital	Aeronomy/Ionospheric	4 July	Successful
4 July; 08:41	Apogee: 100 kilometres (62 mi)					
7 July; 16:20:00	(Canada) Black Brant IX		(United States) White Sands		(United States) NASA	
7 July; 16:20:00	(United States) VAULT 3	NRL	Suborbital	Solar	7 July	Successful
7 July; 16:20:00	(China) Dong Feng 21		(China) Xichang		(China) PLA	
7 July; 16:20:00		PLA	Suborbital	ASAT test	7 July	Launch failure
7 July; 16:20:00	Intercept failed					
21 July; 08:01	(United States) LGM-30G Minuteman III		(United States) Vandenberg LF-10		(United States) US Air Force	
21 July; 08:01	(United States) SERV-1	US Air Force	Suborbital	Missile test	21 July	Successful
=== August ===
3 August; 18:45	(Canada) Black Brant IX		(United States) White Sands		(United States) NASA	
3 August; 18:45	(United States) USC-6	USCLA	Suborbital	Solar	3 August	Successful
3 August	(United States) Castor 4B		(United States) Barking Sands		(United States) US Army	
3 August	(United States) CHCM-1	US Army	Suborbital	Test flight	3 August	Successful
3 August	Apogee: 400 kilometres (250 mi)					
17 August; 07:06	(Russia) R-29RMU Sineva		(Russia) Severodvinsk, Barents Sea		(Russia) VMF	
17 August; 07:06		VMF	Suborbital	Missile test	17 August	Successful
17 August; 07:06	Apogee: 1,000 kilometres (620 mi)					
18 August	(United States) Castor 4B		(United States) Barking Sands		(United States) US Army	
18 August	(United States) CHCM-1	US Army	Suborbital	Test flight	18 August	Successful
18 August	Apogee: 400 kilometres (250 mi)					
26 August; 08:01	(United States) LGM-30G Minuteman III		(United States) Vandenberg LF-26		(United States) US Air Force	
26 August; 08:01	(United States) GT-188GM/SERV-2	US Air Force	Suborbital	Missile test	26 August	Successful
26 August; 08:01	Apogee: 1,300 kilometres (810 mi)					
=== September ===
7 September; 08:53	(United States) LGM-30G Minuteman III		(United States) Vandenberg LF-04		(United States) US Air Force	
7 September; 08:53	(United States) GT-187-1GM	US Air Force	Suborbital	Missile test	7 September	Successful
7 September; 08:53	Apogee: 1,300 kilometres (810 mi)					
14 September; 08:01	(United States) LGM-30G Minuteman III		(United States) Vandenberg LF-09		(United States) US Air Force	
14 September; 08:01	(United States) GT-189GM/ALCS	US Air Force	Suborbital	Missile test	14 September	Successful
14 September; 08:01	Apogee: 1,300 kilometres (810 mi)					
26 September	(United States) LRALT		(United States) C-17, Midway		(United States) MDA	
26 September		MDA	Suborbital	Target	26 September	Successful
26 September	Apogee: 300 kilometres (190 mi), test of COBRA DANE radar system					
27 September; 13:22	(Russia) RSM-56 Bulava		(Russia) Dmitri Donskoi, White Sea		(Russia) VMF	
27 September; 13:22		VMF	Suborbital	Missile test	27 September	Successful
27 September; 13:22	Apogee: 1,000 kilometres (620 mi), maiden flight of Bulava, launched whilst submarine was surfaced					
30 September; 07:06	(Russia) R-29R Volna		(Russia) Svyatoy Georgiy Pobedonosets, Okhotsk Sea		(Russia) VMF	
30 September; 07:06		VMF	Suborbital	Missile test	30 September	Successful
30 September; 07:06	Apogee: 1,000 kilometres (620 mi)					
=== October ===
7 October; 21:30	(Russia) Volna		(Russia) Borisoglebsk, Barents Sea		(Russia) VMF	
7 October; 21:30	(Russia) IRDT-2R	ESA/NPO Lavochkin	Suborbital	Technology	6 October	Spacecraft failure
7 October; 21:30	Apogee: 200 kilometres (120 mi), recovery failed					
10 October; 21:10:08	(United States) UGM-133 Trident II D5		(United Kingdom) HMS Vanguard, ETR		(United Kingdom) Royal Navy	
10 October; 21:10:08		Royal Navy	Suborbital	Missile test	10 October	Successful
10 October; 21:10:08	Apogee: 1,000 kilometres (620 mi), DASO-8					
20 October; 07:30	(Russia) RS-18B UR-100NU		(Kazakhstan) Baikonur Site 175/2		(Russia) RVSN	
20 October; 07:30		RVSN	Suborbital	Missile test	20 October	Successful
20 October; 07:30	Apogee: 1,000 kilometres (620 mi)					
27 October; 13:45	(Brazil) (United States) VS-30/Orion		(Norway) Andøya		(Germany) DLR	
27 October; 13:45	(Germany) SHEFEX	DLR	Suborbital	Test flight	27 October	Successful
27 October; 13:45	Apogee: 211 kilometres (131 mi)					
=== November ===
1 November; 17:10	(Russia) RT-2PM Topol		(Russia) Kapustin Yar		(Russia) RVSN	
1 November; 17:10	(Russia) IP-10	RVSN	Suborbital	Missile test	1 November	Successful
1 November; 17:10	Apogee: 1,000 kilometres (620 mi)					
2 November; 22:34	(United States) Terrier Mk.70-Oriole		(United States) Barking Sands		(United States) NASA	
2 November; 22:34		NAWC	Suborbital	Target	2 November	Successful
2 November; 22:34	Apogee: 300 kilometres (190 mi)					
14 November; 20:30	(United States) Terrier-Improved Orion		(United States) White Sands		(United States) NASA	
14 November; 20:30		NAWC	Suborbital	Target	14 November	Successful
14 November; 20:30	Apogee: 130 kilometres (81 mi)					
18 November; 18:12	(United States) Castor 4B (MRT)		(United States) Barking Sands		(United States) U.S. Navy	
18 November; 18:12	(United States) FTM-04-2 Target	U.S. Navy	Suborbital	Target	18 November	Successful
18 November; 18:12	Apogee: 150 kilometres (93 mi), intercepted by SM-3.					
18 November; 18:16	(United States) RIM-161 Standard Missile 3		(United States) USS Lake Erie		(United States) U.S. Navy	
18 November; 18:16	(United States) FTM-04-2 Interceptor	U.S. Navy	Suborbital	Aegis test	18 November	Successful
18 November; 18:16	"Stellar Valkyrie", apogee: 150 kilometres (93 mi), intercepted MRT.					
18 November; 20:13	(United States) Terrier-Improved Orion		(United States) White Sands		(United States) NASA	
18 November; 20:13		NAWC	Suborbital	Target	18 November	Successful
18 November; 20:13	Apogee: 130 kilometres (81 mi)					
22 November	(United States) THAAD		(United States) White Sands		(United States) Lockheed Martin	
22 November	(United States) FTT-1	Lockheed Martin	Suborbital	Test flight	22 November	Successful
22 November	Apogee: 100 kilometres (62 mi)					
29 November; 07:44	(Russia) RT-2PM Topol		(Russia) Plesetsk		(Russia) RVSN	
29 November; 07:44		RVSN	Suborbital	Missile test	29 November	Successful
29 November; 07:44	Apogee: 1,000 kilometres (620 mi)					
=== December ===
9 December; 19:02:42	(United States) UGM-133 Trident II D5		(United States) Submarine, ETR LP-5		(United States) US Navy	
9 December; 19:02:42		US Navy	Suborbital	Missile test	9 December	Successful
9 December; 19:02:42	Apogee: 1,000 kilometres (620 mi), FCET-34					
14 December; 03:04	(United States) Orbital Boost Vehicle		(Marshall Islands) Meck		(United States) MDA	
14 December; 03:04	(United States) FT-1	MDA	Suborbital	GBI test	14 December	Successful
14 December; 03:04	Apogee: 1,800 kilometres (1,100 mi)					
20 December; 19:30	(United States) Terrier-Orion		(United States) Wallops		(United States) NASA	
20 December; 19:30		NASA	Suborbital	Technology	20 December	Successful
20 December; 19:30	Apogee: 100 kilometres (62 mi)					
21 December; 05:19	(Russia) RSM-56 Bulava		(Russia) Dmitri Donskoi, White Sea		(Russia) VMF	
21 December; 05:19		VMF	Suborbital	Missile test	21 December	Successful
21 December; 05:19	Apogee: 1,000 kilometres (620 mi), first submerged Bulava launch					
=== Unknown date ===
Unknown	(India) RH-300 Mk.II		(India) Satish Dhawan		(India) ISRO	
Unknown		ISRO	Suborbital	Test flight		Successful
Unknown	Apogee: 130 kilometres (81 mi)					
Unknown	(United States) UGM-133 Trident II D5		(United States) Submarine, WTR		(United States) US Navy	
Unknown		US Navy	Suborbital	Missile test		Successful
Unknown	Apogee: 1,000 kilometres (620 mi)					

- ← Jan
- Feb
- Mar
- Apr
- May
- Jun
- Jul
- Aug
- Sep
- Oct
- Nov
- Dec →

== Deep Space Rendezvous ==
Date (GMT)	Spacecraft	Event	Remarks
14 January	Cassini	Flyby of Titan	Closest approach: 60,000 kilometres (37,000 mi)
14 January	Huygens	First soft landing on planet's satellite outside Moon and on Titan	
15 February	Cassini	3rd flyby of Titan	Closest approach: 950 kilometres (590 mi)
17 February	Cassini	Flyby of Enceladus	Closest approach: 1,180 kilometres (730 mi)
4 March	Rosetta	1st flyby of the Earth	Gravity assist
9 March	Cassini	Flyby of Enceladus	Closest approach: 500 kilometres (310 mi)
31 March	Cassini	4th flyby of Titan	Closest approach: 2,523 kilometres (1,568 mi)
16 April	Cassini	5th flyby of Titan	Closest approach: 950 kilometres (590 mi)
4 July	Deep Impact	First impact to comet	Projectile impacts 9P/Tempel 1
14 July	Cassini	Flyby of Enceladus	Closest approach: 1,000 kilometres (620 mi)
2 August	MESSENGER	Flyby of the Earth	Gravity assist
22 August	Cassini	6th flyby of Titan	Closest approach: 4,015 kilometres (2,495 mi)
7 September	Cassini	7th flyby of Titan	Closest approach: 950 kilometres (590 mi)
12 September	Hayabusa	Arrival at asteroid 25143 Itokawa	
26 September	Cassini	Flyby of Hyperion	Closest approach: 990 kilometres (620 mi)
11 October	Cassini	Flyby of Dione	Closest approach: 500 kilometres (310 mi)
28 October	Cassini	8th flyby of Titan	Closest approach: 1,446 kilometres (899 mi)
12 November	MINERVA	Failed to land on Itokawa	
19 November	Hayabusa	Accidentally landed on Itokawa; The first asteroid ascent	Stayed for 30 min
25 November	Hayabusa	Made a touch-and-go on Itokawa for sampling	Status unclear
26 November	Cassini	Flyby of Rhea	Closest approach: 500 kilometres (310 mi)
26 December	Cassini	9th flyby of Titan	Closest approach: 10,429 kilometres (6,480 mi)

== EVAs ==
Start date/time (UTC)	Duration	End time (UTC)	Spacecraft	Crew	Remarks
26 January; 07:43	5 hours 28 minutes	13:11	Expedition 10; ISS Pirs	(United States) Leroy Chiao (Russia) Salizhan Sharipov	Completed the installation of the Universal Work Platform, mounted the European commercial experiment Rokviss (Robotic Components Verification on ISS) and its antenna, installed the Russian Biorisk experiment, and relocated a Japanese exposure experiment.
28 March; 06:25	4 hours 30 minutes	10:55	Expedition 10; ISS Pirs	(United States) Leroy Chiao (Russia) Salizhan Sharipov	Installed navigational and communications equipment for the arrival of the first Automated Transfer Vehicle (ATV), and deployed the 5-kilogram (11-pound) Russian TNS-0 nanosatellite.
30 July; 09:48	6 hours 50 minutes	17:36	STS-114; Discovery	(Japan) Soichi Noguchi (United States) Stephen Robinson	Performed using Shuttle airlock whilst docked to the ISS. Demonstrated shuttle thermal protection repair techniques and enhancements to the Station's attitude control system. installed a base and cabling for an External Stowage Platform, rerouted power to Control Moment Gyroscope-2 (CMG-2), retrieved two exposure experiments, and replaced a faulty global positioning system antenna on the station.
1 August; 08:42	7 hours 14 minutes	15:56	STS-114; Discovery	(Japan) Soichi Noguchi (United States) Stephen Robinson	Performed using Shuttle airlock whilst docked to the ISS. Removed faulty CMG-1 from the Z1 truss, installed faulty CMG-1 into Discovery's payload bay, and installed new CMG-1 onto the Z1 truss segment.
3 August; 08:48	6 hours 1 minute	14:49	STS-114; Discovery	(Japan) Soichi Noguchi (United States) Stephen Robinson	Performed using Shuttle airlock whilst docked to the ISS. Photographed and inspected Discovery's heat shield, removed two protruding gap fillers from between tiles in the forward area of the orbiter's underside, and installed amateur radio satellite PCSAT2.
18 August; 19:02	4 hours 58 minutes	19 August; 00:00	Expedition 11; ISS Pirs	(Russia) Sergei Krikalyov (United States) John L. Phillips	Retrieved one of three canisters from the Biorisk experiment, removed Micro-Particles Capturer experiment and Space Environment Exposure Device from Zvezda, retrieved Matroska experiment, installed an ATV docking television camera.
7 November; 15:32	5 hours 22 minutes	20:54	Expedition 12; ISS Quest	(United States) William S. McArthur (Russia) Valery Tokarev	Installed and set up the P1 Truss camera, retrieved a failed Rotary Joint Motor Controller (RJMC), jettisoned a Floating Potential Probe, and removed and replaced a remote power controller module on the Mobile Transporter. First Quest-based spacewalk since April 2003.

== Orbital launch statistics ==
=== By country ===
For the purposes of this section, the yearly tally of orbital launches by country assigns each flight to the country of origin of the rocket, not to the launch services provider or the spaceport.

Country	Launches	Successes	Failures	Partial failures
China	5	5	0	0
France	5	5	0	0
India	1	1	0	0
Japan	2	2	0	0
Russia	25	22	3	0
Ukraine	5	5	0	0
United States	12	12	0	0
World	55	52	3	0

=== By rocket ===
- Ariane 5
- Atlas III
- Atlas V
- Delta II
- Long March 2
- Long March 3
- Minotaur I
- Molniya-M
- Soyuz-U
- Soyuz-FG
- Kosmos-3M
- Titan IV
- Proton-K
- Proton-M
- Rokot
- Zenit-3SL
- Others

==== By family ====
Family	Country	Launches	Successes	Failures	Partial failures	Remarks
Ariane	France	5	5	0	0	
Atlas	United States	3	3	0	0	
Delta	United States	3	3	0	0	
H-II	Japan	1	1	0	0	
Long March	China	5	5	0	0	
Minotaur	United States	2	2	0	0	
Mu	Japan	1	1	0	0	
Pegasus	United States	1	1	0	0	
PSLV	India	1	1	0	0	
R-7	Russia	12	11	1	0	
R-14	Russia	3	3	0	0	
R-29	Russia	1	0	1	0	
R-36	Ukraine	1	1	0	0	
Space Shuttle	United States	1	1	0	0	
Titan	United States	2	2	0	0	Final flight
Universal Rocket	Russia	9	8	1	0	
Zenit	Ukraine	4	4	0	0	

==== By type ====
Rocket	Country	Family	Launches	Successes	Failures	Partial failures	Remarks
Ariane 5	France	Ariane	5	5	0	0	
Atlas III	United States	Atlas	1	1	0	0	Final flight
Atlas V	United States	Atlas	2	2	0	0	
Delta II	United States	Delta	3	3	0	0	
Dnepr	Ukraine	R-36	1	1	0	0	
H-IIA	Japan	H-II	1	1	0	0	
Kosmos	Russia	R-12/R-14	3	3	0	0	
Long March 2	China	Long March	4	4	0	0	
Long March 3	China	Long March	1	1	0	0	
Minotaur I	United States	Minotaur	2	2	0	0	
M-V	Japan	Mu	1	1	0	0	
Molniya	Russia	R-7	1	0	1	0	
Pegasus	United States	Pegasus	1	1	0	0	
PSLV	India	PSLV	1	1	0	0	
Proton	Russia	Universal Rocket	7	7	0	0	
Soyuz	Russia	R-7	11	11	0	0	
Space Shuttle	United States	Space Shuttle	1	1	0	0	
Titan IV	United States	Titan	2	2	0	0	Final flight
UR-100	Russia	Universal Rocket	2	1	1	0	
Volna	Russia	R-29	1	0	1	0	
Zenit	Ukraine	Zenit	4	4	0	0	

==== By configuration ====
Rocket	Country	Type	Launches	Successes	Failures	Partial failures	Remarks
Ariane 5 ECA	France	Ariane 5	2	2	0	0	
Ariane 5 GS	France	Ariane 5	3	3	0	0	Maiden flight
Atlas IIIB	United States	Atlas III	1	1	0	0	Final flight
Atlas V 401	United States	Atlas V	1	1	0	0	
Atlas V 431	United States	Atlas V	1	1	0	0	Maiden flight
Delta II 7320	United States	Delta II	1	1	0	0	
Delta II 7925	United States	Delta II	2	2	0	0	
Dnepr	Ukraine	Dnepr	1	1	0	0	
H-IIA 2022	Japan	H-IIA	1	1	0	0	Maiden flight
Kosmos-3M	Russia	Kosmos	3	3	0	0	
Long March 2C	China	Long March 2	1	1	0	0	
Long March 2D	China	Long March 2	2	2	0	0	
Long March 2F	China	Long March 2	1	1	0	0	
Long March 3B	China	Long March 3	1	1	0	0	
Minotaur I	United States	Minotaur I	2	2	0	0	
M-V	Japan	M-V	1	1	0	0	
Molniya-M / ML	Russia	Molniya	1	0	1	0	Final flight
Pegasus-XL	United States	Pegasus	1	1	0	0	
PSLV-G	India	PSLV	1	1	0	0	
Proton-K / DM-2	Russia	Proton	2	2	0	0	
Proton-K / DM-2M	Russia	Proton	1	1	0	0	
Proton-M / Briz-M	Russia	Proton	4	4	0	0	
Rokot / Briz-KM	Russia	UR-100	2	1	1	0	
Soyuz-FG	Russia	Soyuz	2	2	0	0	
Soyuz-FG / Fregat	Russia	Soyuz	3	3	0	0	
Soyuz-U	Russia	Soyuz	6	6	0	0	
Space Shuttle	United States	Space Shuttle	1	1	0	0	
Titan IV-B (404B)	United States	Titan IV	1	1	0	0	Final flight
Titan IV-B (405B)	United States	Titan IV	1	1	0	0	Final flight
Volna	Russia	Volna	1	0	1	0	Maiden flight
Zenit-3SL	Ukraine	Zenit	4	4	0	0	

=== By launch site ===
- Jiuquan
- Taiyuan
- Xichang
- Kourou
- Satish Dhawan
- Ocean Odyssey
- Tanegashima
- Uchinoura
- Baikonur
- Barents Sea
- Plesetsk
- Cape Canaveral
- Kennedy Space Center
- Vandenberg

Site	Country	Launches	Successes	Failures	Partial failures	Remarks
Baikonur	Kazakhstan	19	19	0	0	
Barents Sea	Russia	1	0	1	0	Launched from Borisoglebsk submarine
Cape Canaveral	United States	6	6	0	0	
Jiuquan	China	4	4	0	0	
Kennedy	United States	1	1	0	0	
Kourou	France	5	5	0	0	
Ocean Odyssey	(United Nations) International	4	4	0	0	
Plesetsk	Russia	6	4	2	0	
Satish Dhawan	India	1	1	0	0	
Tanegashima	Japan	1	1	0	0	
Uchinoura	Japan	1	1	0	0	
Vandenberg	United States	5	5	0	0	One launch used Stargazer aircraft
Xichang	China	1	1	0	0	
Total		55	52	3	0	

=== By orbit ===
- Transatmospheric
- Low Earth
- Low Earth (ISS)
- Low Earth (SSO)
- Low Earth (retrograde)
- Medium Earth
- Geosychronous
  (transfer)
- Inclined GSO
- High Earth
- Heliocentric

Orbital regime	Launches	Successes	Failures	Accidentally achieved	Remarks
Transatmospheric	0	0	0	0	
Low Earth	29	27	2	0	7 to ISS
Medium Earth / Molniya	4	3	1	0	
Geosynchronous / GTO	19	19	0	0	
High Earth / Lunar transfer	0	0	0	0	
Heliocentric / Planetary transfer	3	3	0	0	
Total	55	52	3	0	
