= NUTS 1 (satellite) =

Satellite

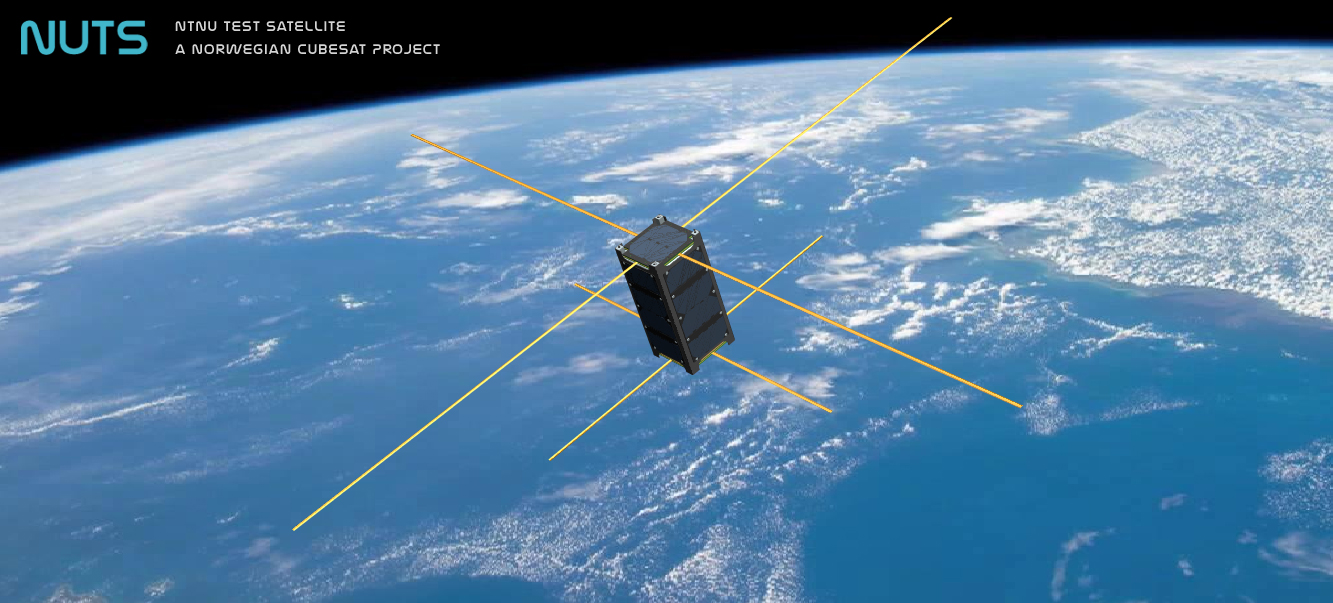
- Image showing artists rendition of NUTS 1 in orbit
- Mission type: Atmospheric studies
- Operator: NUTS project - NTNU

Spacecraft properties
- Manufacturer: NTNU
- Launch mass: 2.66 kg (5.9 lb)

End of mission
- Decay date: Launch + <20 years

Orbital parameters
- Reference system: Geocentric
- Regime: Low Earth
- Inclination: 98° Polar planned
- Period: Approx 1 hour planned

NUTS-1 (NTNU Test Satellite) was a Norwegian 2U CubeSat created by the NUTS student satellite project at the Norwegian University of Science and Technology (NTNU). The satellite was developed by students from several engineering and science disciplines. It was one of three CubeSats part of the Norwegian student space program ANSAT, the other two are the CubeStar and the HiNCube. From NTNUs CubeSat projects NUTS-1 is a successor of the nCube-1 and nCube-2 projects. The mission was stopped, and the small satellite activities are continued by the Orbit NTNU student organization and the HYPSO mission from NTNU Small Satellite Lab.

== Specifications ==
The satellite is based on the standardized CubeSat dimensions made to fit into a specialized deployer. 2U or double means the satellite will be 2 standard cuboid units long. Outside dimensions are locked to the standards interface, but internal dimensions are created on a platform uniquely developed for the satellite. Electronics will be based on a non-standard backplane design, in contrast to common stacked Printed Circuit Board designs.

== Subsystems ==
The subsystems of NUTS-1 is in designed, constructed and built by the students in the projects, using few off the shelf parts. Commercially based single electronic components are used throughout the system. The satellite is structured into the subsystems below.

=== Structure ===
NUTS-1 is built with lightweight fiber reinforced plastic, to make frame and supporting structures as lightweight as possible. CubeSats are commonly built around an aerospace aluminum alloy, using polymers in space is challenging in relation to the effects of space on the material.

=== Onboard computer ===
The OBC system will use an Atmel AVR32 UC3 with access to external flash and RAM, running a FreeRTOS lightweight operating system.

=== Communication ===
The NUTS antenna system will consist of a VHF and a UHF circular polarized turnstile antenna. Communication will be done on standard ham radio bands.

=== Electric power system ===
NUTS-1 will use high efficiency solar cells covering 5 of 6 sides of the satellite, the solar cells will charge a battery-pack and supply power to the on-board electronics.

=== Attitude determination and control system ===
NUTS-1 attitude determination and control system (ADCS) will consist of magnetorquers, wound copper coil around each axis that will act relative to the magnetic field of the Earth. Gyros and magnetometers will be used in combination with the solar panels to calculate the orientation.

=== Payload ===
The satellite is planned to carry an IR-camera to capture images of atmospheric fluid gravity waves.

A wireless bus is also implemented as a secondary payload for testing purposes.

== Launch ==
The satellite was planned to be launched in a P-POD (Poly-pico orbital deployer) or a similar deployer as an auxiliary payload. The CubeSat was previously planned to be launched in 2016.

== See also ==
- List of CubeSats
