= NCube (satellites) =

Norwegian satellites

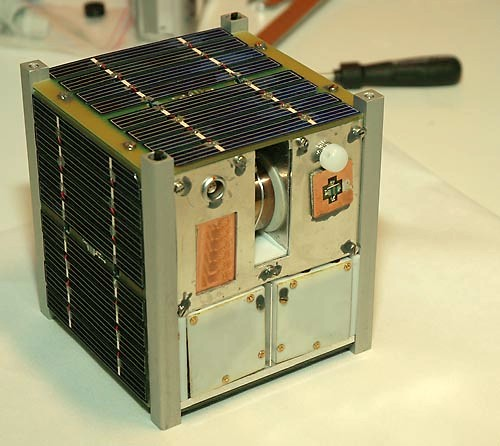
The Norwegian satellite NCube-2

NCube (Norwegian CubeSat) was a series of two Norwegian satellites, made by students at several Norwegian universities and university colleges. Due to problems during launch (NCube-1) and deployment into orbit (NCube-2), neither of the satellites became operational.

Both satellites were built to the CubeSat picosatellite standard, which defined their mass and size (10 cm cube). This standard allows one or more cube satellites to be launched by 'piggybacking' with a larger satellite. In this way the smaller satellites get a cheap ride into orbit.

The goal of the NCube satellites was to stimulate interest in science and increase competence in space technology among students and educational institutions. Moreover, enhance cooperation between educational institutions and industry and exchange of knowledge between educational institutions in north and south of Norway.

The second goal was to communicate with amateur radio ground stations, and to test a space-born Automatic Identification System (AIS) receiver for tracking ships and reindeer. The AIS payload was built from a COTS CMX586 GMSK modem and an 8Mhz Atmel AVR 8-bit microcontroller. Kongsberg Seatex provided technical support to the project. The company later became the main supplier of AIS receiver hardware for the fleet of professional Norwegian AIS satellites.

Project development began in 2001. The original launch deadline was March 2004.

NCube-2 was launched into orbit onboard a Kosmos-3M on 27 October 2005 from Plesetsk Cosmodrome. No signal was ever received from the satellite and it may have become stuck in the deployment mechanism.

On July 26, 2006, NCube-1 was launched onboard a Dnepr which failed to reach orbit.

As of 2013, NTNU was developing a 2U CubeSat called NUTS-1.

== See also ==
- List of CubeSats
