= HYPSO =

Norwegian satellite

HYPSO project
- Mission type: Remote sensing of ocean color

Spacecraft properties
- Manufacturer: NTNU SSL

Orbital parameters
- Regime: Low Earth

HYPSO (Hyperspectral imaging satellite) is a Norwegian 6U CubeSat created by several people at SSL(SmallSat Lab) at Norwegian University of Science and Technology (NTNU). The satellite has been engineered by masters and phd students moslty from the IE institute.
