= ION (satellite) =

Failed CubeSat satellite

The Illinois Observing Nanosatellite (ION) is the first CubeSat mission developed by the students of University of Illinois at Urbana-Champaign. The satellite was lost in the failure of the Dnepr launch on 26 July 2006. Completed in April 2005 as a part of the Illinois Tiny Satellite Initiative, the satellite took almost four years to be designed, built and tested by an interdisciplinary team of student engineers. The payloads included a photometer, a micro-thruster and a camera.

== Mission objectives ==
The science and technology objectives of the ION-1 mission were aimed at advancing key enabling technologies for CubeSats:

1. Measurement of oxygen intensity in Earth's ionosphere to understand how energy transfers occur across large regions
2. Test the MicroVacuum Arc Thruster (μVAT), a versatile small satellite propulsion technology for lateral movement and fine-control of attitude
3. Test the SID processor board designed specifically for small satellites in low Earth orbit (LEO)
4. Test a small CMOS camera for Earth imaging
5. Demonstrate attitude stabilization on a CubeSat

== Future missions at UIUC ==
ION-1 was built using the IlliniSat-1 bus. The upgraded IlliniSat-2 bus is now under development for missions such as Lower Atmosphere Ionosphere Coupling Experiment (LAICE) and the CubeSail, both to be launched in 2016.
