= Vandenberg Launch Facility 10 =

Coordinates: 34.8506°N 120.5940°W

Launch Facility 10
- Interactive map of Launch Facility 10
- Launch site: Vandenberg Space Force Base
- Short name: LF-10
- Operator: US Air Force
- Total launches: 40
- Launch pad: 1
Launch history
- Status: Active
- First launch: 12 July 1987; Minuteman III
- Last launch: 21 May 2025; Minuteman III
- Associated rockets: Minuteman III

Vandenberg Space Force Base Launch Facility 10 (LC-10) is a US Air Force Intercontinental ballistic missile launch facility on Vandenberg SFB, California, USA. It is a launch site for the land-based LGM-30 Minuteman ICBMs.
