= Starsem =

- Industry: engineering, technical studies
- Founded: 1996; 30 years ago
- Headquarters: Évry, France
- Owners: ArianeGroup (35%); Arianespace (15%); Roscosmos (25%); Progress Rocket Space Centre (25%)
- Website: starsem.com

Starsem is a French-Russian company that was created in 1996 to commercialise the Soyuz launcher internationally. Starsem is headquartered in Évry, France (near Paris) and has the following shareholders:

- ArianeGroup (35%)
- Arianespace (15%)
- Roscosmos (25%)
- Progress Rocket Space Centre (25%)

== Consequences of the Russia-Ukraine war ==
After Russia invaded Ukraine in February 2022, all Soyuz launches performed via Starsem were suspended indefinitely. This is also evident from the lack of news releases on the Starsem website since then, with the last headline from February 15, 2022.
