= 2007 in spaceflight =

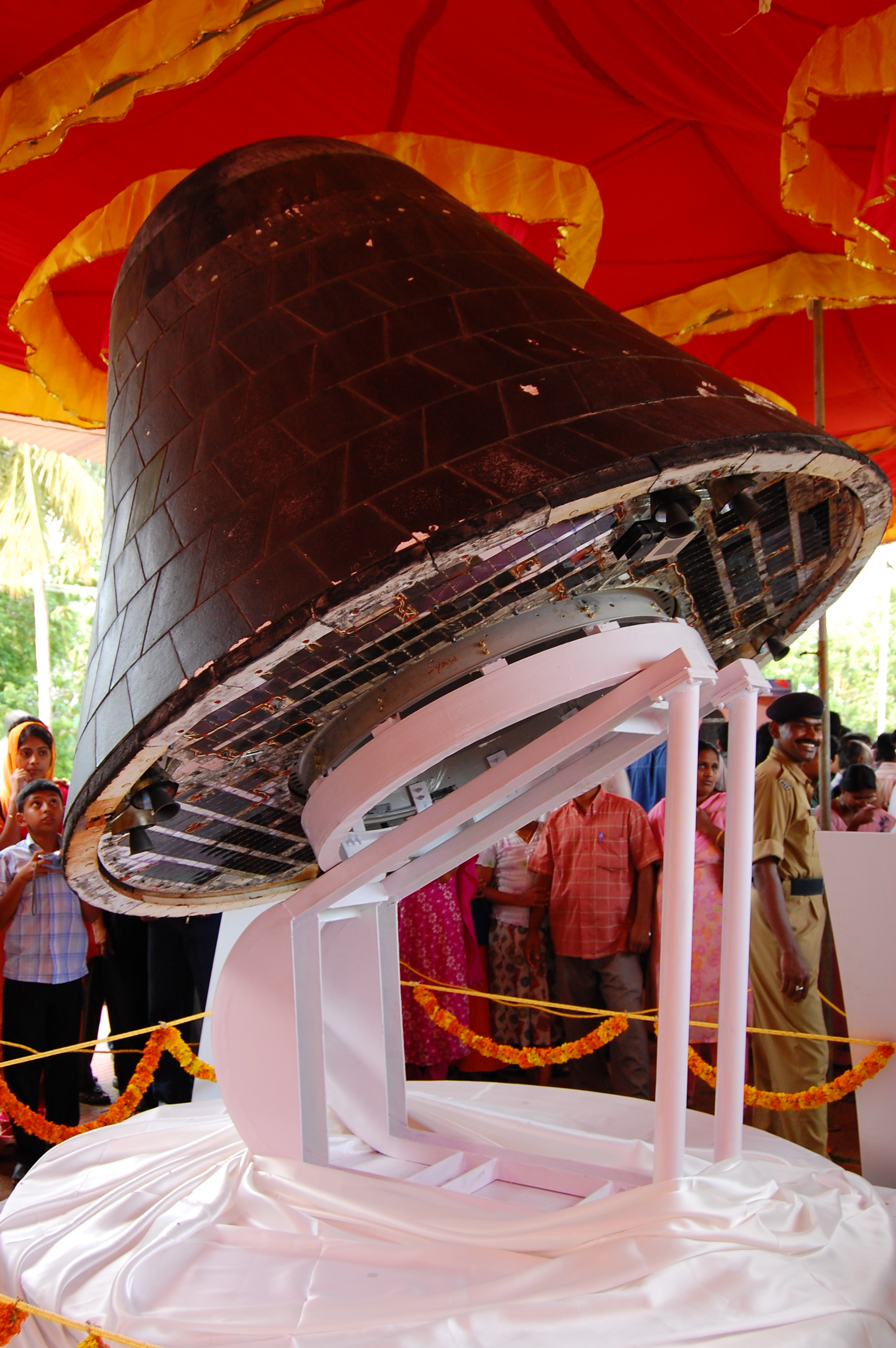
- SRE-1, the first Indian recovered spacecraft, on public display at Thiruvananthapuram

Orbital launches
- First: 10 January
- Last: 25 December
- Total: 68
- Successes: 63
- Failures: 3
- Partial failures: 2
- Catalogued: 65

National firsts
- Satellite: Colombia; Mauritius
- Space traveller: Malaysia

Rockets
- Maiden flights: Atlas V 421; Long March 3B/E; Proton-M Enhanced; PSLV-CA; Shavit-2; Zenit-2M
- Retirements: H-IIA 2022

Crewed flights
- Orbital: 5
- Total travellers: 27

2007 in spaceflight

The year 2007 contained several significant events in spaceflight, including a Chinese ASAT test, the launches of the US Phoenix and Dawn missions to study Mars and Asteroid belt respectively, Japan's Kaguya Lunar orbiter, and the first Chinese Lunar probe, Chang'e 1.

The internationally accepted definition of a spaceflight is any flight which crosses the Kármán line, 100 kilometres above sea level. The first recorded spaceflight launch of the year occurred on 10 January, when a PSLV, launched from the Satish Dhawan Space Centre, placed four spacecraft into low Earth orbit. One of these spacecraft was SRE-1, which returned to Earth twelve days later, in the first Indian attempt to recover a satellite after re-entry.

Several carrier rockets made their maiden flights in 2007; the PSLV-CA, Long March 3B/E, Shavit-2, Zenit-2M, Proton-M Enhanced. These were all modernised or upgraded versions of existing systems. The RS-24 missile also conducted its first launch, and the Atlas V made its first flight in the 421 configuration. The first Colombian and Mauritian satellites, Libertad 1 and Rascom-QAF 1 respectively, were launched in 2007, although a helium leak reduced Rascom's operational lifetime by thirteen years.

== Space exploration ==
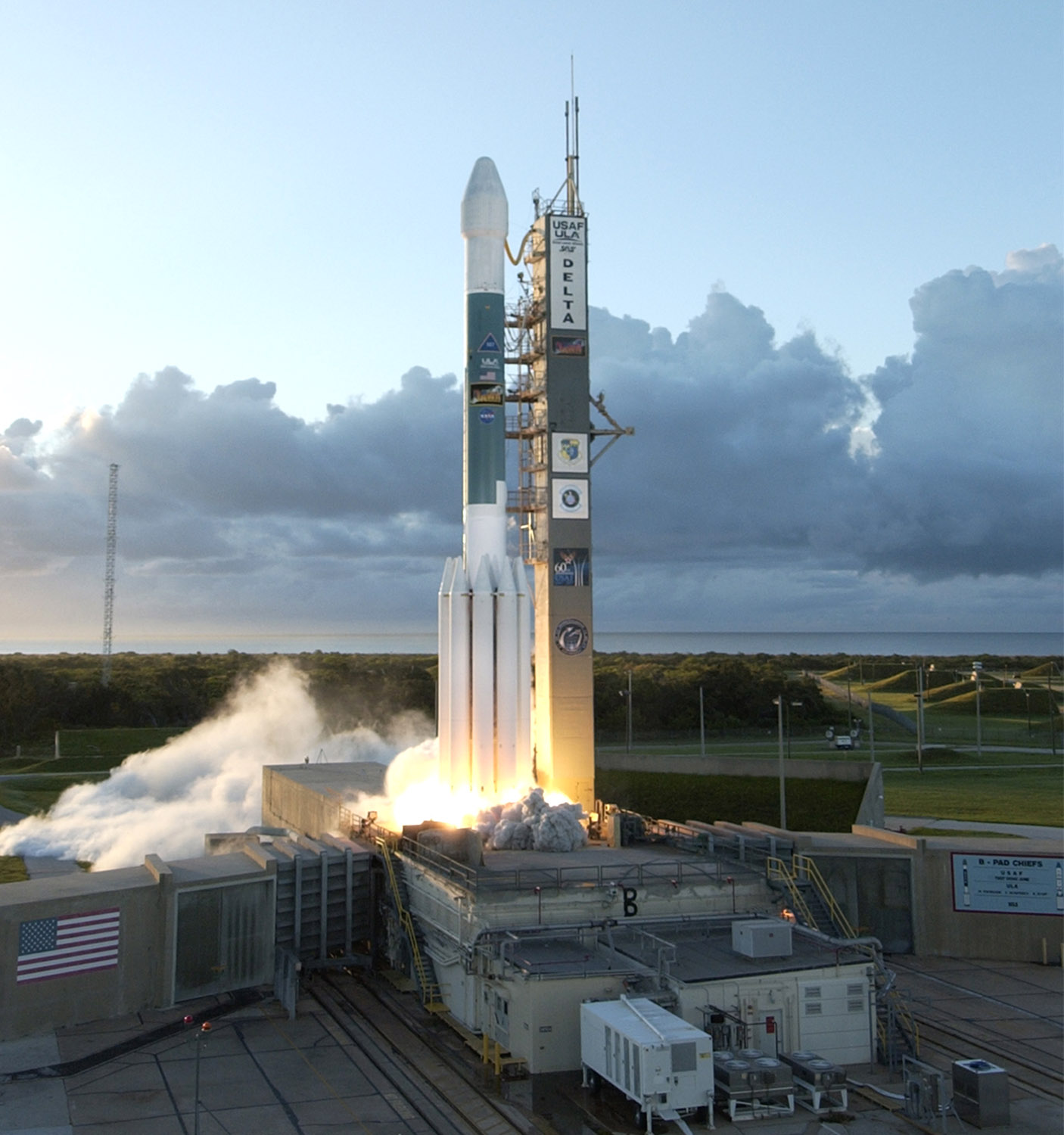
The launch of a Delta II Heavy with the Dawn spacecraft.

Several spacecraft were launched to explore the Moon. Japan's Kaguya orbiter, along with the smaller Okina and Ouna relay spacecraft, was launched on 14 September. The spacecraft entered Selenocentric orbit on 3 October. China launched its first Lunar probe, Chang'e 1, on 24 October, with the spacecraft entering Selenocentric orbit on 5 November. In 2009, two satellites launched into highly elliptical Earth orbits in 2007 as part of the THEMIS mission were also sent to the Moon. They are expected to arrive in October 2010.

In August, the NASA Phoenix spacecraft was launched towards Mars, followed by the Dawn mission to the Asteroid belt in September. Cassini continued to make flybys of the moons of Saturn, mostly focussing on Titan. In November, Rosetta flew past Earth, where it was mistaken for an asteroid, and given the provisional designation 2007 VN_{84}.

== Crewed spaceflight ==
Five crewed flights were launched in 2007, two by Russia and three by the United States. Russia flew two Soyuz missions to the International Space Station for crew rotation. Soyuz TMA-10, launched on 7 April, carried the Expedition 15 crew to the Station. Space tourist Charles Simonyi was also launched on this flight, and landed aboard Soyuz TMA-9 a few days later. When TMA-10 returned to Earth in October, it made the first of two consecutive ballistic re-entries of Soyuz spacecraft, due to problems with separation bolts. Soyuz TMA-11, launched on 10 October, carried the Expedition 16 crew, and the first Malaysian in space, Sheikh Muszaphar Shukor, who was selected for flight under the Angkasawan programme. He landed aboard Soyuz TMA-10. When TMA-11 landed in 2008, it also made a ballistic descent.

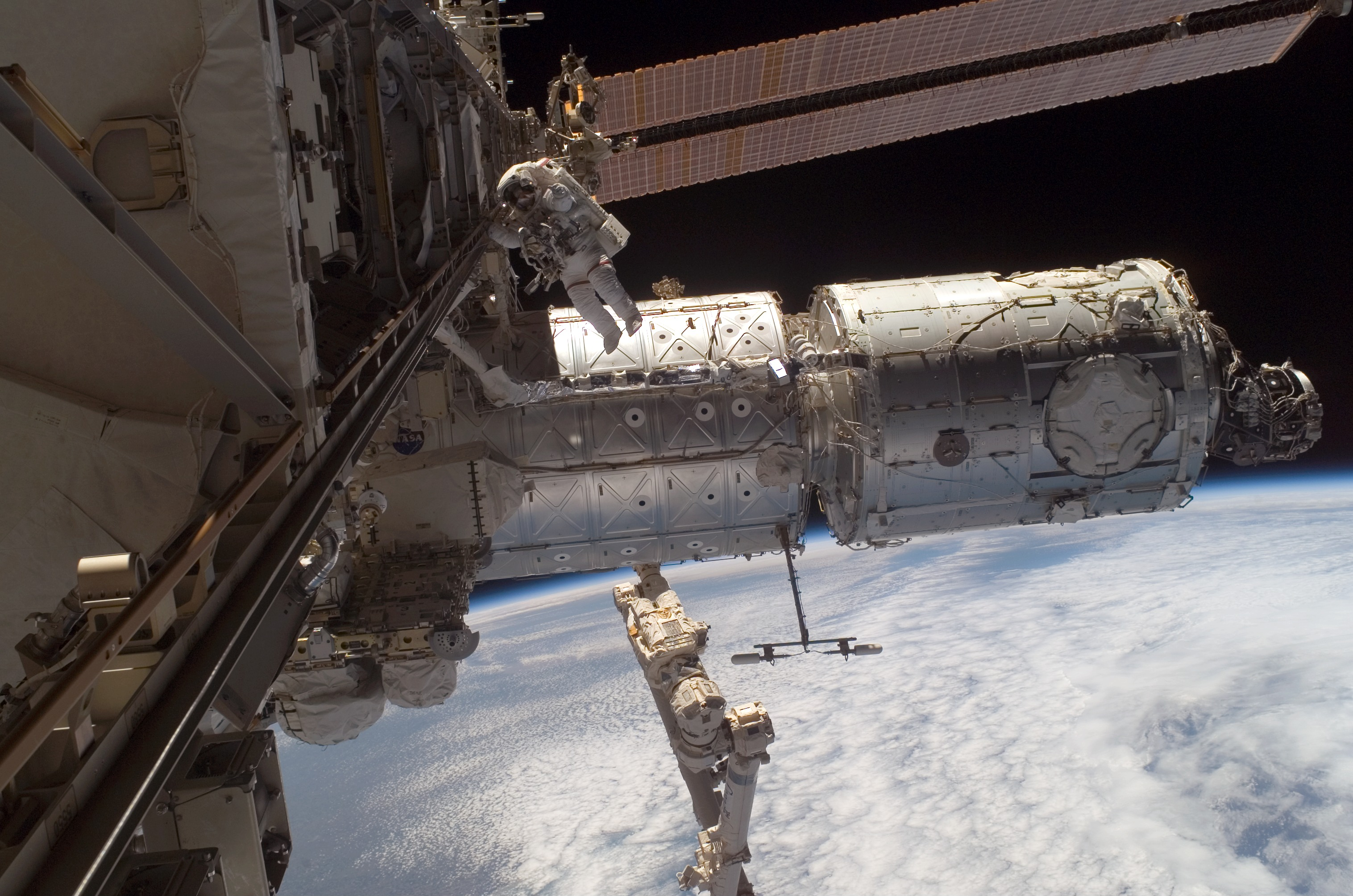
The newly installed Harmony node of the ISS

2007 also saw the continued assembly of the International Space Station, by US Space Shuttle flights. On 8 June Atlantis made the first Shuttle launch of the year, STS-117, with seven astronauts, and the S3/4 truss segment of the ISS. It was the first Shuttle to launch from Complex 39A at the Kennedy Space Center since STS-107 in 2003. Launch had previously been delayed from February due to Hail damage to the External Tank, which required a rollback to repair in the Vehicle Assembly Building. In August, Endeavour launched on its first mission since 2002, STS-118. This carried the S5 truss segment, and marked the final flight of the Spacehab module, which was used to carry supplies. NASA's first Educator Astronaut, Barbara Morgan flew aboard STS-118. Morgan had previously been a backup for Christa McAuliffe, who was killed in the Challenger accident in 1986. STS-120, launched on 23 October using Discovery, carried the Harmony node, the first pressurised ISS component to be launched since Pirs in September 2001. Attempts to launch Atlantis in December on STS-122 were scrubbed, and the launch was delayed to 2008 after ECO sensors in the External Tank failed.

== Launch failures ==
Three orbital launch attempts in 2007, involving a Zenit, a Falcon 1, and a Proton failed, and two others, an Atlas V and a GSLV, resulted in partial failures. On 30 January, a Sea Launch Zenit-3SL exploded on the Ocean Odyssey launch platform, seconds after ignition. The failure destroyed the NSS-8 satellite, and caused considerable damage to the Odyssey platform. It was later determined that the failure had been caused by debris in the turbopump. As a result of downtime to conduct repairs, and bad sea conditions at the end of the year, Sea Launch did not conduct another launch until 2008.

On 21 March, SpaceX launched the second Falcon 1. Due to the failure of the maiden flight, the launch was conducted as a demonstration flight without a functional payload. The launch failed to reach orbit due to a chain of events, starting with an error in setting the fuel mix ratio, which resulted in first stage underperformance, and the rocket being too low at the time of first stage separation. Additional atmospheric drag at this altitude caused recontact between the stages, setting up a fuel slosh in the second stage. This resulted in the premature cutoff of the second stage, and the rocket failed to reach orbit. This was the last launch of the Falcon 1 with the ablatively cooled Merlin-1A engine, which was replaced with the regeneratively cooled Merlin-1C for subsequent flights, starting in August 2008. As several test objectives were completed, SpaceX claimed that the launch was a success overall, and declared the Falcon 1 operational.

The Atlas family ended a run of eighty consecutive successful launches over fourteen years, after a partial failure of an Atlas V launched on 15 June. A faulty valve caused a fuel leak in the Centaur upper stage, resulting in a premature cutoff at the end of its second burn. This resulted in the USA-194 satellites being delivered into a lower orbit than planned. The spacecraft were able to correct the orbit using their manoeuvring engines.

The fifth GSLV was launched on 2 September, with the INSAT-4CR satellite. This was the first GSLV launch since the failure in July 2006. The rocket underperformed, and placed the satellite into an orbit with a lower apogee and greater inclination than planned. This required the spacecraft to use fuel reserved for stationkeeping to raise itself to the correct orbit, at the expense of its operational lifetime.

On 5 September, a Proton-M with a Briz-M upper stage failed to place the JCSAT-11 into orbit, after the second stage of the carrier rocket failed to separate from the first. It was later established that damaged cabling had been the cause of the malfunction.

== Summary of launches ==
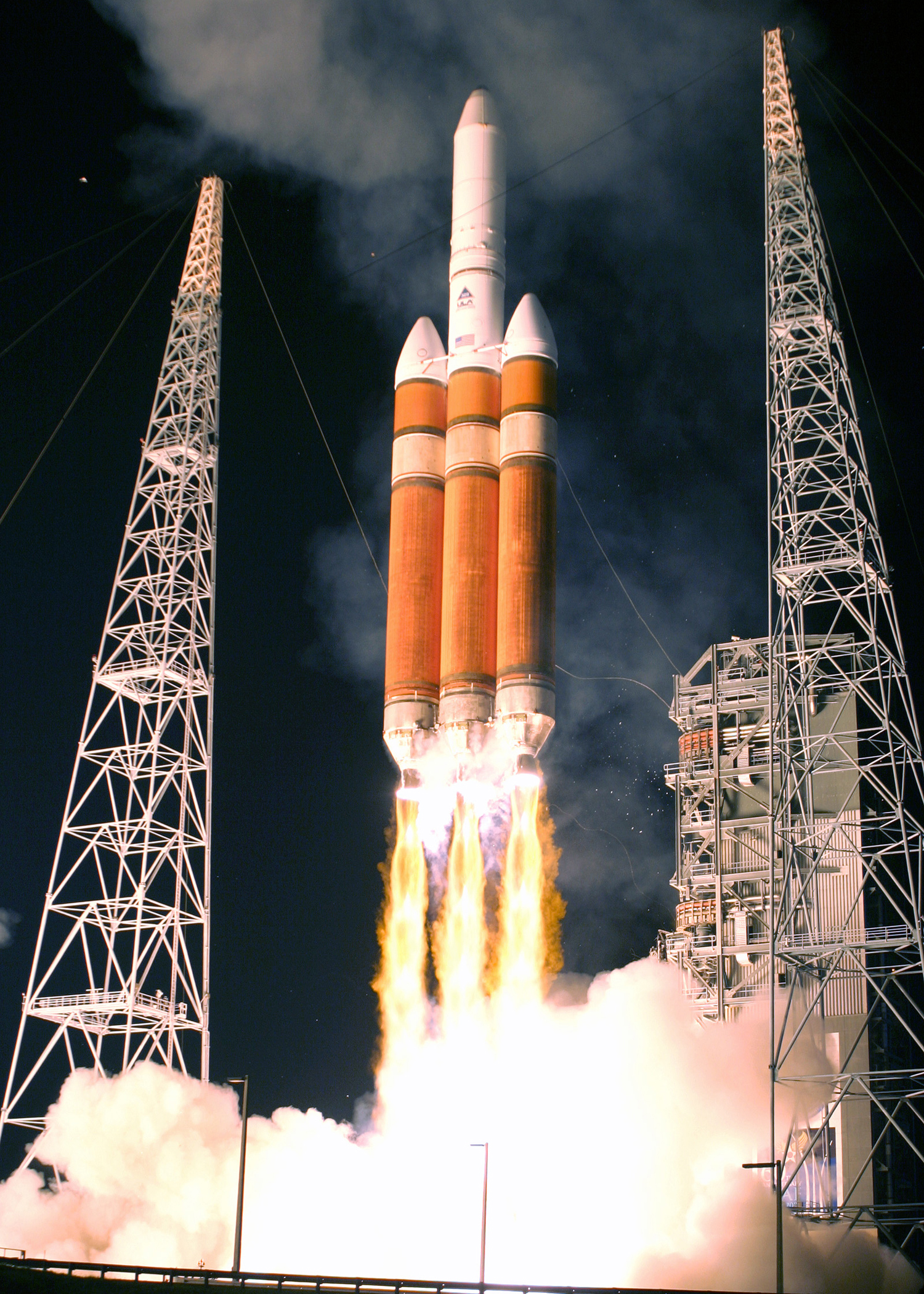
The launch of a Delta IV Heavy with the final DSP satellite.

In total, sixty eight orbital launches were made in 2007, with sixty five reaching orbit, and three outright failures. This was an increase of two orbital launch attempts on 2006, with one more launch reaching orbit. The final launch of the year was conducted on 25 December, by a Proton-M with three GLONASS navigation satellites for the Russian government.

Suborbital spaceflight in 2007 saw a number of sounding rocket and missile launches. On 11 January, the Chinese People's Liberation Army used a Dong-Feng 21 derived anti-satellite weapon to destroy Feng Yun 1C, a retired weather satellite. Russia also began testing the RS-24 Yars missile

China conducted ten orbital launches in 2007, using the Long March family of rockets, whilst Europe conducted five using the Ariane 5. India made three orbital launch attempts, using PSLV-C, PSLV-CA and GSLV rockets, with the GSLV launch resulting in a partial failure. Israel conducted a single successful launch using the first Shavit-2 rocket. Japan successfully launched two H-IIA rockets. Russia and the former Soviet Union conducted twenty six launches, including one failure, but not including the international Sea Launch programme, whose single launch attempt failed. Nineteen launches were conducted by the United States, which had originally announced plans to launch many more, however technical issues with the Atlas V, Delta IV and Falcon 1, caused a number of delays. Two of six planned Space Shuttle launches were also delayed to 2008, STS-123 due to knock-on delays from STS-117, and STS-122 due to problems with engine cutoff sensors.

== Launches ==
- ← Jan
- Feb
- Mar
- Apr
- May
- Jun
- Jul
- Aug
- Sep
- Oct
- Nov
- Dec →

Date and time (UTC)	Rocket	Flight number	Launch site		LSP	
Date and time (UTC)	Payload (⚀ = CubeSat)	Operator	Orbit	Function	Decay (UTC)	Outcome
Date and time (UTC)	Remarks					
=== January ===
10 January; 03:53	(India) PSLV-C		(India) Satish Dhawan FLP		(India) ISRO	
10 January; 03:53	(India) Cartosat-2	ISRO	Low Earth (SSO)	Earth observation	14 February 2024; 10:18	Successful
10 January; 03:53	(India) SRE-1	ISRO	Low Earth (polar)	Technology demonstration	22 January; 04:16	Successful
10 January; 03:53	(Indonesia) (Germany) Lapan-TUBsat	LAPAN/TU Berlin	Low Earth (polar)	Earth observation	In orbit	Operational
10 January; 03:53	(Argentina) Pehuensat-1	AATE	Low Earth (polar)	Technology demonstration	16 January 2023	Successful
10 January; 03:53	SRE was the first Indian spacecraft to be recovered following reentry. Pehuensat-1 intentionally remained attached to the payload adapter.					
18 January; 02:12	(Russia) Soyuz-U		(Kazakhstan) Baikonur Site 1/5		(Russia) Roskosmos	
18 January; 02:12	(Russia) Progress M-59	Roskosmos	Low Earth (ISS)	Logistics	1 August; 19:26	Successful
18 January; 02:12	ISS flight 24P					
30 January; 23:22	(Ukraine) Zenit-3SL		(Norway) Ocean Odyssey		(United Nations) Sea Launch	
30 January; 23:22	(Netherlands) NSS-8	SES New Skies	Intended: Geosynchronous	Communication	T-0	Launch failure
30 January; 23:22	First stage engine failed due to debris in turbopump, rocket exploded on launch pad					
← Jan; Feb; Mar; Apr; May; Jun; Jul; Aug; Sep; Oct; Nov; Dec →; === February ===
2 February; 16:28	(China) Long March 3A		(China) Xichang LA-2		(China) CNSA	
2 February; 16:28	(China) Beidou-1D	CNSA	Geostationary	Navigation	In orbit	Partial spacecraft failure Operational
2 February; 16:28	Problems deploying solar panels, eventually corrected from ground					
17 February; 23:01	(United States) Delta II 7925-10C		(United States) Cape Canaveral SLC-17B		(United States) United Launch Alliance	
17 February; 23:01	(United States) THEMIS A	NASA	Highly elliptical	Auroral	In orbit	Operational
17 February; 23:01	(United States) THEMIS B (2007–2009) (United States) Artemis P1 (2009—)	NASA	Highly elliptical Selenocentric (planned)	Auroral	In orbit	Operational
17 February; 23:01	(United States) THEMIS C (2007–2009) (United States) Artemis P2 (2009—)	NASA	Highly elliptical Selenocentric (planned)	Auroral	In orbit	Operational
17 February; 23:01	(United States) THEMIS D	NASA	Highly elliptical	Auroral	In orbit	Operational
17 February; 23:01	(United States) THEMIS E	NASA	Highly elliptical	Auroral	In orbit	Operational
17 February; 23:01	Primary THEMIS mission completed in 2009. Three spacecraft remain in use for an extension of the same mission, whilst the other two are en route to the Moon for the Artemis mission.					
24 February; 04:41	(Japan) H-IIA 2024		(Japan) Tanegashima LA-Y1		(Japan) JAXA	
24 February; 04:41	(Japan) IGS-Radar 2	CSICE	Sun-synchronous	Reconnaissance	13 April 2014	Partial spacecraft failure
24 February; 04:41	(Japan) IGS-Optical 3V	CSICE	Sun-synchronous	Reconnaissance; Technology	12 November 2013; 02:31	Successful
24 February; 04:41	IGS-Radar 2 failed on 29 August 2010 due to battery problems					
← Jan; Feb; Mar; Apr; May; Jun; Jul; Aug; Sep; Oct; Nov; Dec →; === March ===
9 March; 03:10	(United States) Atlas V 401		(United States) Cape Canaveral SLC-41		(United States) United Launch Alliance	
9 March; 03:10	(United States) ASTRO	DARPA	Low Earth	Technology	25 October 2013	Successful
9 March; 03:10	(United States) CFESat	LANL	Low Earth	Ionospheric	12 November 2022	Successful
9 March; 03:10	(United States) FalconSAT-3	US Air Force Academy	Low Earth	Ionospheric; Plasma	21 January 2023	Successful
9 March; 03:10	(United States) MidSTAR-1	US Naval Academy	Low Earth	Radiation; Technology	17 August 2023	Successful
9 March; 03:10	(United States) NEXTSat	DARPA	Low Earth	Technology	21 April 2023	Successful
9 March; 03:10	(United States) STPSat-1	US Air Force/STP	Low Earth	Atmospheric; Technology	8 November 2023	Successful
9 March; 03:10	ASTRO and NEXTSat were used for the Orbital Express test programme, with the former refuelling and servicing the latter. Launch designated STP-1.					
11 March; 22:03	(France) Ariane 5ECA		(France) Kourou ELA-3		(France) Arianespace	
11 March; 22:03	(United Kingdom) Skynet 5A	Paradigm/MoD	Geosynchronous	Communications	In orbit	Operational
11 March; 22:03	(India) INSAT-4B	ISRO	Geosynchronous	Communications	In orbit	Successful
21 March; 01:10	(United States) Falcon 1		(Marshall Islands) Omelek		(United States) SpaceX	
21 March; 01:10	(United States) DemoSat (LCT2/AFSS)	SpaceX/DARPA/NASA	Intended: Low Earth	Technology	21 March	Launch failure
21 March; 01:10	Loss of signal after control problems, failed to reach orbit, some test objectives achieved.					
← Jan; Feb; Mar; Apr; May; Jun; Jul; Aug; Sep; Oct; Nov; Dec →; === April ===
7 April; 17:31	(Russia) Soyuz-FG		(Kazakhstan) Baikonur Site 1/5		(Russia) Roskosmos	
7 April; 17:31	(Russia) Soyuz TMA-10	Roskosmos	Low Earth (ISS)	ISS Expedition 15	21 October; 10:36	Successful
7 April; 17:31	Crewed flight with three cosmonauts, including a paying space tourist					
9 April; 22:54	(Russia) Proton-M/Briz-M		(Kazakhstan) Baikonur Site 200/39		(Russia) (United States) ILS	
9 April; 22:54	(Canada) Anik F3	Telesat	Geosynchronous	Communications	In orbit	Partial spacecraft failure
9 April; 22:54	Ka-band transmitter malfunction					
11 April; 03:27	(China) Long March 2C-III		(China) Taiyuan LC-1		(China) CNSA	
11 April; 03:27	(China) Haiyang-1B	CAST	Sun-synchronous	Oceanography	In orbit	Operational
13 April; 20:11	(China) Long March 3A		(China) Xichang LA-3		(China) CNSA	
13 April; 20:11	(China) Compass-M1 (Beidou-2A)	CNSA	Medium Earth	Navigation	In orbit	Operational
17 April; 06:46:34	(Ukraine) Dnepr		(Kazakhstan) Baikonur Site 109/95		(Russia) ISC Kosmotras	
17 April; 06:46:34	(Egypt) EgyptSat 1	NARS	Sun-synchronous	Observation	In orbit	Operational
17 April; 06:46:34	(Saudi Arabia) Saudisat-3	RSRI	Sun-synchronous	Scientific	In orbit	Operational
17 April; 06:46:34	(Saudi Arabia) SaudiComsat-3	RSRI	Sun-synchronous	Communications	In orbit	Operational
17 April; 06:46:34	(Saudi Arabia) SaudiComsat-4	RSRI	Sun-synchronous	Communications	In orbit	Operational
17 April; 06:46:34	(Saudi Arabia) SaudiComsat-5	RSRI	Sun-synchronous	Communications	In orbit	Operational
17 April; 06:46:34	(Saudi Arabia) SaudiComsat-6	RSRI	Sun-synchronous	Communications	In orbit	Operational
17 April; 06:46:34	(Saudi Arabia) SaudiComsat-7	RSRI	Sun-synchronous	Communications	In orbit	Operational
17 April; 06:46:34	(United States) CP-3	CalPoly	Sun-synchronous	Technology	In orbit	Partial spacecraft failure Operational
17 April; 06:46:34	(United States) CP-4	CalPoly	Sun-synchronous	Technology	In orbit	Operational
17 April; 06:46:34	(United States) CAPE-1	Lafayette	Sun-synchronous	Technology	In orbit	Partial spacecraft failure
17 April; 06:46:34	(Colombia) Libertad 1	Sergio Arboleda	Sun-synchronous	Technology	In orbit	Successful
17 April; 06:46:34	(United States) AeroCube 2	Aerospace Corporation	Sun-synchronous	Technology	In orbit	Spacecraft failure
17 April; 06:46:34	(United States) CSTB-1	Boeing	Sun-synchronous	Technology	In orbit	Operational
17 April; 06:46:34	(United States) MAST	Tethers Unlimited	Sun-synchronous	Technology	In orbit	Operational
17 April; 06:46:34	CP-3, CP-4, CAPE-1, Libertad 1, AeroCube 2, CSTB-1, and MAST in P-POD containers, problems with power supply of CAPE-1; Libertad 1 deactivated following completion of mission; AeroCube 2 suffered solar panel/converter malfunction; CP-3 mission affected by communications system reliability issues					
23 April; 10:00	(India) PSLV-CA		(India) Satish Dhawan SLP		(India) ISRO	
23 April; 10:00	(Italy) AGILE	ASI	Low Earth	GR Astronomy	13 February 2024	Successful
23 April; 10:00	(India) AAM	ISRO	Low Earth	Technology	19 July 2022	Successful
23 April; 10:00	Maiden flight of PSLV-CA					
24 April; 06:48	(United States) Minotaur I		(United States) MARS Pad 0B		(United States) Orbital Sciences	
24 April; 06:48	(United States) NFIRE	MDA	Low Earth	Missile defence	4 November 2015	Successful
25 April; 20:26:00	(United States) Pegasus-XL		(United States) L-1011, Vandenberg		(United States) Orbital Sciences	
25 April; 20:26:00	(United States) AIM (SMEX 9)	NASA	Low Earth	Aeronomy	In orbit	Operational
← Jan; Feb; Mar; Apr; May; Jun; Jul; Aug; Sep; Oct; Nov; Dec →; === May ===
4 May; 22:29	(France) Ariane 5ECA		(France) Kourou ELA-3		(France) Arianespace	
4 May; 22:29	(Luxembourg) Astra 1L	SES Astra	Geosynchronous	Communications	In orbit	Operational
4 May; 22:29	(United States) Galaxy 17	Intelsat	Geosynchronous	Communications	In orbit	Operational
12 May; 03:25:38	(Russia) Soyuz-U		(Kazakhstan) Baikonur Site 1/5		(Russia) Roskosmos	
12 May; 03:25:38	(Russia) Progress M-60	Roskosmos	Low Earth (ISS)	Logistics	25 September; 19:48	Successful
12 May; 03:25:38	ISS flight 25P					
13 May; 16:01	(China) Long March 3B/E		(China) Xichang LA-2		(China) CNSA	
13 May; 16:01	(Nigeria) NigComSat-1	NASRDA	Service: Geosynchronous; Now: Graveyard	Communications	In orbit	Spacecraft failure
13 May; 16:01	Maiden flight of Long March 3B/E, first African geosynchronous communication satellite, retired due to power system malfunction in November 2008.					
25 May; 07:12	(China) Long March 2D		(China) Jiuquan LA-4/SLS-2		(China) CNSA	
25 May; 07:12	(China) Yaogan 2	CNSA	Sun-synchronous	Earth imaging	In orbit	Operational
25 May; 07:12	(China) Zheda PiXing-1 (MEMS-Pico)	Zhejiang University	Sun-synchronous	Technology	In orbit	Operational
25 May; 07:12	100th successful Chinese orbital launch, MEMS-Pico conducted microelectronic research					
29 May; 20:31:30	(Russia) Soyuz-FG/Fregat		(Kazakhstan) Baikonur Site 31/6		(France) (Russia) Starsem	
29 May; 20:31:30	(United States) Globalstar 65	Globalstar	Low Earth	Communications	In orbit	Operational
29 May; 20:31:30	(United States) Globalstar 69	Globalstar	Low Earth	Communications	In orbit	Operational
29 May; 20:31:30	(United States) Globalstar 71	Globalstar	Low Earth	Communications	In orbit	Operational
29 May; 20:31:30	(United States) Globalstar 72	Globalstar	Low Earth	Communications	In orbit	Operational
31 May; 16:08	(China) Long March 3A		(China) Xichang LA-2		(China) CNSA	
31 May; 16:08	(China) Sinosat-3	Sinosat	Geosynchronous	Communications	In orbit	Operational
31 May; 16:08	100th flight of Long March carrier rocket					
← Jan; Feb; Mar; Apr; May; Jun; Jul; Aug; Sep; Oct; Nov; Dec →; === June ===
7 June; 18:00	(Russia) Soyuz-U		(Russia) Plesetsk Site 16/2		(Russia) VKS	
7 June; 18:00	(Russia) Kosmos 2427 (Kobal't-M)	VKS	Low Earth	Reconnaissance	22 August; 21:00	Successful
8 June; 02:34:01	(United States) Delta II 7420-10		(United States) Vandenberg SLC-2W		(United States) United Launch Alliance	
8 June; 02:34:01	(Italy) COSMO-1	ASI	Sun-synchronous	Imaging	In orbit	Operational
8 June; 23:38:04	(United States) Space Shuttle Atlantis		(United States) Kennedy Space Center LC-39A		(United States) United Space Alliance	
8 June; 23:38:04	(United States) STS-117	NASA	Low Earth (ISS)	ISS assembly	22 June; 19:49:38	Successful
8 June; 23:38:04	(United Nations) ITS S3/4 Truss	NASA	Low Earth (ISS)	ISS component	In orbit	Operational
8 June; 23:38:04	Crewed orbital flight with 7 astronauts, ISS crew rotation					
10 June	(Israel) Shavit-2		(Israel) Palmachim		Israel Aerospace Industries	
10 June	(Israel) Ofeq-7	IAI/Israeli military	Low Earth (retrograde)	Reconnaissance	In orbit	Operational
10 June	Maiden flight of Shavit-2					
15 June; 02:14	(Ukraine) Dnepr		(Kazakhstan) Baikonur Site 109/95		(Russia) ISC Kosmotras	
15 June; 02:14	(Germany) TerraSAR-X	DLR	Low Earth	Radar imaging	In orbit	Operational
15 June; 15:04	(United States) Atlas V 401		(United States) Cape Canaveral SLC-41		(United States) United Launch Alliance	
15 June; 15:04	(United States) USA-194 (NOSS-3-4A)	NRO	Low Earth	Ocean surveillance	In orbit	Partial launch failure Operational
15 June; 15:04	(United States) USA-194 (NOSS-3-4B)	NRO	Low Earth	Ocean surveillance	In orbit	Partial launch failure Operational
15 June; 15:04	NRO Launch 30R, placed in incorrect orbit due to premature cutoff of Centaur upper stage, spacecraft corrected using their own thrusters, reducing lifespan					
28 June; 15:02	(Ukraine) Dnepr		(Russia) Dombarovskiy		(Russia) ISC Kosmotras	
28 June; 15:02	(United States) Genesis II	Bigelow Aerospace	Low Earth	Technology	In orbit	Operational
28 June; 15:02	Experimental inflatable module					
29 June; 10:00	(Ukraine) Zenit-2M		(Kazakhstan) Baikonur Site 45/1		(Russia) VKS	
29 June; 10:00	(Russia) Kosmos 2428 (Tselina-2)	VKS	Low Earth	ELINT	In orbit	Operational
29 June; 10:00	Maiden flight of Zenit-2M					
← Jan; Feb; Mar; Apr; May; Jun; Jul; Aug; Sep; Oct; Nov; Dec →; === July ===
2 July; 19:38	(Russia) Kosmos-3M		(Russia) Plesetsk Site 132/1		(Russia) COSMOS International	
2 July; 19:38	(Germany) SAR-Lupe-2	Bundeswehr	Low Earth (Polar)	Radar reconnaissance	In orbit	Operational
5 July; 12:08	(China) Long March 3B		(China) Xichang LA-2		(China) CNSA	
5 July; 12:08	(China) Chinasat-6B	ChinaSatcom	Geosynchronous	Communications	In orbit	Operational
7 July; 01:16:00	(Russia) Proton-M/Briz-M Enhanced		(Kazakhstan) Baikonur Site 200/39		(Russia) (United States) International Launch Services	
7 July; 01:16:00	(United States) DirecTV-10	DirecTV	Geosynchronous	Communications	In orbit	Operational
7 July; 01:16:00	Maiden flight of Proton-M Enhanced					
← Jan; Feb; Mar; Apr; May; Jun; Jul; Aug; Sep; Oct; Nov; Dec →; === August ===
2 August; 17:33:48	(Russia) Soyuz-U		(Kazakhstan) Baikonur Site 1/5		(Russia) Roskosmos	
2 August; 17:33:48	(Russia) Progress M-61	Roskosmos	Low Earth (ISS)	Logistics; Technology	22 January 2008; 19:52	Successful
2 August; 17:33:48	ISS flight 26P, Remained in orbit after undocking to conduct technological experiments					
4 August; 09:26:34	(United States) Delta II 7925		(United States) Cape Canaveral SLC-17A		(United States) United Launch Alliance	
4 August; 09:26:34	(United States) Phoenix	NASA	Heliocentric	Mars lander	25 May 2008; 23:38	Successful
4 August; 09:26:34	Landed on Mars, discovered water there, last signal from spacecraft received on 2 November 2008					
8 August; 22:36:42	(United States) Space Shuttle Endeavour		(United States) Kennedy Space Center LC-39A		(United States) United Space Alliance	
8 August; 22:36:42	(United States) STS-118	NASA	Low Earth (ISS)	ISS assembly	21 August; 16:32	Successful
8 August; 22:36:42	(United States) SpaceHab LSM	NASA/SpaceHab	Low Earth (STS)	Logistics	21 August; 16:32	Successful
8 August; 22:36:42	(United Nations) S5 Truss	NASA	Low Earth (ISS)	ISS component	In orbit	Operational
8 August; 22:36:42	Crewed orbital flight with seven astronauts, final flight of SpaceHab module					
14 August; 23:44	Unknown		(France) Kourou ELA-3		(France) Arianespace	
14 August; 23:44	(United States) Spaceway 3	Hughes	Geostationary	Communications	In orbit	Operational
14 August; 23:44	(Japan) BSat 3a	BSAT	Geostationary	Communications	In orbit	Operational
← Jan; Feb; Mar; Apr; May; Jun; Jul; Aug; Sep; Oct; Nov; Dec →; === September ===
2 September; 12:51	(India) GSLV		(India) Satish Dhawan SLP		(India) ISRO	
2 September; 12:51	(India) INSAT-4CR	ISRO	Geosynchronous	Communications	In orbit	Partial launch failure Partial spacecraft failure Operational
2 September; 12:51	Apogee lower and inclination higher than expected, due to carrier rocket underperformance, lifespan further reduced by drift following tracking failure. 5 years of operational life lost.					
5 September; 22:43	(Russia) Proton-M/Briz-M		(Kazakhstan) Baikonur Site 200/39		(Russia) (United States) International Launch Services	
5 September; 22:43	(Japan) JCSAT-11	JSAT Corporation	Intended: Geostationary	Communications	~+135 seconds	Launch failure
5 September; 22:43	Second stage failed to separate due to damaged cabling.					
11 September; 13:05	(Russia) Kosmos-3M		(Russia) Plesetsk Site 132/1		(Russia) VKS	
11 September; 13:05	(Russia) Kosmos 2429 (Parus)	VKS	Low Earth	Navigation	In orbit	Operational
14 September; 01:31:01	(Japan) H-IIA 2022		(Japan) Tanegashima LA-Y1		(Japan) Mitsubishi	
14 September; 01:31:01	(Japan) Kaguya (SELENE)	JAXA	Selenocentric	Lunar orbiter	In orbit	Operational
14 September; 01:31:01	(Japan) Okina (RStar)	JAXA	Selenocentric	Lunar orbiter	12 February 2009; 08:46	Successful
14 September; 01:31:01	(Japan) Ouna (VStar)	JAXA	Selenocentric	Lunar orbiter	In orbit	Operational
14 September; 11:00	(Russia) Soyuz-U		(Kazakhstan) Baikonur Site 1/5		(Russia) Roskosmos	
14 September; 11:00	(Russia) Foton-M3	Roskosmos/ESA	Low Earth	Scientific	26 September	Successful
14 September; 11:00	YES2		Low Earth	Technology development	Unknown	Spacecraft failure
14 September; 11:00	YES2 tether may have failed to deploy fully. Satellite recovery failed.					
18 September; 18:35	(United States) Delta II 7920-10C		(United States) Vandenberg SLC-2W		(United States) United Launch Alliance	
18 September; 18:35	(United States) WorldView-1	DigitalGlobe	Low Earth	Imaging	In orbit	Operational
18 September; 18:35	75th consecutive successful Delta II launch.					
19 September; 03:26	(China) Long March 4B		(China) Taiyuan LC-1		(China) CNSA	
19 September; 03:26	(China) (Brazil) CBERS-2B (Ziyuan 1-02B)	CASC/INPE	Sun-synchronous	Remote sensing	In orbit	Operational
27 September; 11:34	(United States) Delta II 7925H		(United States) Cape Canaveral SLC-17B		(United States) United Launch Alliance	
27 September; 11:34	(United States) Dawn	NASA	Heliocentric; Then: Ceres orbit Then: Vesta orbit	Asteroid research	In orbit	Operational
27 September; 11:34	Will explore dwarf planet Ceres and asteroid 4 Vesta, Ceres was designated as an asteroid during mission planning					
← Jan; Feb; Mar; Apr; May; Jun; Jul; Aug; Sep; Oct; Nov; Dec →; === October ===
5 October; 22:02:26	Unknown		(France) Kourou ELA-3		(France) Arianespace	
5 October; 22:02:26	(United States) Intelsat 11	Intelsat	Geosynchronous	Communications	In orbit	Operational
5 October; 22:02:26	(Australia) Optus D2	Optus	Geosynchronous	Communications	In orbit	Operational
10 October; 13:22:39	(Russia) Soyuz-FG		(Kazakhstan) Baikonur Site 1/5		(Russia) Roskosmos	
10 October; 13:22:39	(Russia) Soyuz TMA-11	Roskosmos	Low Earth (ISS)	ISS Expedition 16	19 April 2008	Successful
10 October; 13:22:39	Crewed orbital flight with 3 cosmonauts, first Malaysian & South Korean in space					
11 October; 00:22	(United States) Atlas V 421		(United States) Cape Canaveral SLC-41		(United States) United Launch Alliance	
11 October; 00:22	(United States) USA-195 (WGS-1)	US Air Force	Geosynchronous	Communications	In orbit	Operational
11 October; 00:22	Maiden flight of Atlas V 421					
17 October; 12:23:00	(United States) Delta II 7925-9.5		(United States) Cape Canaveral SLC-17A		(United States) United Launch Alliance	
17 October; 12:23:00	(United States) USA-196 (GPS 2R-17/M4)	US Air Force	Medium Earth	Navigation	In orbit	Operational
17 October; 12:23:00	700th flight of Thor rocket (Variant used as first stage).					
20 October; 20:12:25	(Russia) Soyuz-FG/Fregat		(Kazakhstan) Baikonur Site 31/6		(France) (Russia) Starsem	
20 October; 20:12:25	(United States) Globalstar 66	Globalstar	Low Earth	Communications	In orbit	Operational
20 October; 20:12:25	(United States) Globalstar 67	Globalstar	Low Earth	Communications	In orbit	Operational
20 October; 20:12:25	(United States) Globalstar 68	Globalstar	Low Earth	Communications	In orbit	Operational
20 October; 20:12:25	(United States) Globalstar 70	Globalstar	Low Earth	Communications	In orbit	Operational
23 October; 04:39	(Russia) Molniya-M/2BL		(Russia) Plesetsk Site 16/2		(Russia) VKS	
23 October; 04:39	(Russia) Kosmos 2430 (Oko)	VKS	Molniya	Early warning	5 January 2019; 07:58	Successful
23 October; 15:38:19	(United States) Space Shuttle Discovery		(United States) Kennedy Space Center LC-39A		(United States) United Space Alliance	
23 October; 15:38:19	(United States) STS-120	NASA	Low Earth (ISS)	ISS assembly	7 November; 18:01	Successful
23 October; 15:38:19	(United Nations) Harmony (Node 2)	NASA	Low Earth (ISS)	ISS component	In orbit	Operational
23 October; 15:38:19	Crewed orbital flight with 7 astronauts, crew rotation					
24 October; 10:05	(China) Long March 3A		(China) Xichang LA-3		(China) CNSA	
24 October; 10:05	(China) Chang'e 1	CNSA	Selenocentric	Lunar orbiter	1 March 2009; 08:13	Successful
24 October; 10:05	First Chinese lunar probe					
26 October; 07:35:24	(Russia) Proton-K/DM-2		(Kazakhstan) Baikonur Site 81/24		(Russia) VKS	
26 October; 07:35:24	(Russia) Kosmos 2431 (GLONASS-M)	VKS	Medium Earth	Navigation	In orbit	Operational
26 October; 07:35:24	(Russia) Kosmos 2432 (GLONASS-M)	VKS	Medium Earth	Navigation	In orbit	Operational
26 October; 07:35:24	(Russia) Kosmos 2433 (GLONASS-M)	VKS	Medium Earth	Navigation	In orbit	Operational
← Jan; Feb; Mar; Apr; May; Jun; Jul; Aug; Sep; Oct; Nov; Dec →; === November ===
1 November; 00:51:44	(Russia) Kosmos-3M		(Russia) Plesetsk Site 132/1		(Russia) COSMOS International	
1 November; 00:51:44	(Germany) SAR-Lupe 3	Bundeswehr	Low Earth (polar)	Radar reconnaissance	In orbit	Operational
1 November; 00:51:44	(Germany) Rubin-7	OHB System	Low Earth (polar)	Technology	In orbit	Operational
11 November; 01:50	(United States) Delta IV Heavy 9250H		(United States) Cape Canaveral SLC-37B		(United States) United Launch Alliance	
11 November; 01:50	(United States) USA-197 (DSP-23)	DoD	Geosynchronous	Missile defence	In orbit	Spacecraft failure
11 November; 01:50	Final DSP satellite Stopped transmitting in September 2008					
11 November; 22:48	(China) Long March 4C (4B-II)		(China) Taiyuan LC-1		(China) CNSA	
11 November; 22:48	(China) Yaogan 3	CNSA	Sun-synchronous	Remote sensing	In orbit	Operational
11 November; 22:48	First launch of Long March 4C after redesignation					
14 November; 22:06	Unknown		(France) Kourou ELA-3		(France) Arianespace	
14 November; 22:06	(United Kingdom) Skynet 5B	Paradigm/MoD	Geosynchronous	Communications	In orbit	Operational
14 November; 22:06	(Brazil) Star One C1	Star One	Geosynchronous	Communications	In orbit	Operational
14 November; 22:06	Record mass to GTO – 9,535 kg (21,021 lb)					
17 November; 22:39:47	(Russia) Proton-M/Briz-M		(Kazakhstan) Baikonur Site 200/39		(Russia) (United States) International Launch Services	
17 November; 22:39:47	(Sweden) Sirius 4	SES Sirius	Geostationary	Communications	In orbit	Operational
← Jan; Feb; Mar; Apr; May; Jun; Jul; Aug; Sep; Oct; Nov; Dec →; === December ===
9 December; 00:16	(Russia) Proton-M/Briz-M		(Kazakhstan) Baikonur Site 81/24		(Russia) VKS	
9 December; 00:16	(Russia) Globus-1M #11L (Raduga-1M 1)	VKS	Geosynchronous	Communications	In orbit	Operational
9 December; 02:31:42	(United States) Delta II 7420-10		(United States) Vandenberg SLC-2W		(United States) United Launch Alliance	
9 December; 02:31:42	(Italy) COSMO-2	ASI	Sun-synchronous	Reconnaissance	In orbit	Operational
10 December; 22:05	(United States) Atlas V 401		(United States) Cape Canaveral SLC-41		(United States) United Launch Alliance	
10 December; 22:05	(United States) USA-198 (SDS-3-5)	NRO	Molniya	Communications	In orbit	Operational
10 December; 22:05	NRO Launch 24					
14 December; 13:17:34	(Russia) Soyuz-FG/Fregat		(Kazakhstan) Baikonur Site 31/6		(France) (Russia) Starsem	
14 December; 13:17:34	(Canada) RADARSAT 2	MDA Corporation	Sun-synchronous	Radar imaging	In orbit	Operational
20 December; 20:04:00	(United States) Delta II 7925-9.5		(United States) Cape Canaveral SLC-17A		(United States) United Launch Alliance	
20 December; 20:04:00	(United States) USA-199 (GPS 2R-18/M5)	US Air Force	Medium Earth	Navigation	In orbit	Operational
21 December; 21:41:55	Unknown		(France) Kourou ELA-3		(France) Arianespace	
21 December; 21:41:55	(United States) (Japan) Horizons-2	Intelsat/JSAT Corporation	Geosynchronous	Communications	In orbit	Operational
21 December; 21:41:55	(Mauritius) Rascom-QAF 1	RascomSTAR-QAF	Geosynchronous	Communications	In orbit	Partial spacecraft failure Operational
21 December; 21:41:55	Helium leak affected early operations of Rascom-QAF 1, reducing operational lifetime by 13 years.					
23 December; 07:12:41	(Russia) Soyuz-U		(Kazakhstan) Baikonur Site 1/5		(Russia) Roskosmos	
23 December; 07:12:41	(Russia) Progress M-62	Roskosmos	Low Earth (ISS)	Logistics	15 February 2008; 10:29	Successful
23 December; 07:12:41	ISS flight 27P					
25 December; 19:32	(Russia) Proton-M/DM-2		(Kazakhstan) Baikonur Site 81/24		(Russia) VKS	
25 December; 19:32	(Russia) Kosmos 2434 (GLONASS-M)	VKS	Medium Earth	Navigation	In orbit	Operational
25 December; 19:32	(Russia) Kosmos 2435 (GLONASS-M)	VKS	Medium Earth	Navigation	In orbit	Operational
25 December; 19:32	(Russia) Kosmos 2436 (GLONASS-M)	VKS	Medium Earth	Navigation	In orbit	Operational
25 December; 19:32	Maiden flight of Proton-M/DM-2					

- ← Jan
- Feb
- Mar
- Apr
- May
- Jun
- Jul
- Aug
- Sep
- Oct
- Nov
- Dec →

== Suborbital launches ==
- ← Jan
- Feb
- Mar
- Apr
- May
- Jun
- Jul
- Aug
- Sep
- Oct
- Nov
- Dec →

Date and time (UTC)	Rocket	Flight number	Launch site		LSP	
Date and time (UTC)	Payload (⚀ = CubeSat)	Operator	Orbit	Function	Decay (UTC)	Outcome
Date and time (UTC)	Remarks					
=== January ===
11 January; 22:28	(China) DF-21		(China) Xichang		(China) PLA	
11 January; 22:28	(China) ASAT	PLA	Suborbital	ASAT test	11 January	Successful
11 January; 22:28	Destroyed Feng Yun 1C satellite					
16 January; 02:20	(Japan) S-310		(Japan) Uchinoura		(Japan) JAXA	
16 January; 02:20		JAXA	Suborbital	Ionospheric	16 January	Successful
19 January; 12:29	(Canada) Black Brant VB		(United States) Poker Flat		(United States) NASA	
19 January; 12:29	(United States) JOULE II	Clemson	Suborbital	Auroral	19 January	Successful
19 January; 12:30	(Canada) Black Brant IX		(United States) Poker Flat		(United States) NASA	
19 January; 12:30	(United States) JOULE II	Clemson	Suborbital	Auroral	19 January	Successful
19 January; 12:44	(United States) Terrier-Orion		(United States) Poker Flat		(United States) NASA	
19 January; 12:44	(United States) JOULE II	Clemson	Suborbital	Auroral	19 January	Successful
19 January; 12:45	(United States) Terrier-Orion		(United States) Poker Flat		(United States) NASA	
19 January; 12:45	(United States) JOULE II	Clemson	Suborbital	Auroral	19 January	Successful
27 January; 05:20	(Russia) R-17 Elbrus	FTT-06	(United States) Barking Sands		(United States) US Army	
27 January; 05:20		MDA	Suborbital	Target	27 January	Successful
27 January; 05:20	Intercepted by THAAD					
27 January	(United States) THAAD	FTT-06	(United States) Barking Sands		(United States) US Army	
27 January		MDA	Suborbital	ABM test	27 January	Successful
30 January	(Russia) R-17 Elbrus		Syria		(Syria) Syrian Army	
30 January		Syrian Army	Suborbital	Missile test	30 January	Successful
=== February ===
7 February; 08:15	(United States) LGM-30G Minuteman III		(United States) Vandenberg LF-10		(United States) US Air Force	
7 February; 08:15	(United States) GT-193GM	US Air Force	Suborbital	Missile test	7 February	Successful
7 February; 08:15	Impacted Reagan Test Site					
12 February; 12:45	(Canada) Black Brant XII		(United States) Poker Flat		(United States) NASA	
12 February; 12:45	(United States) ROPA	Dartmouth	Suborbital	Auroral	12 February	Successful
14 February; 09:22	(United States) Terrier-Orion		(United States) Poker Flat		(United States) NASA	
14 February; 09:22	(United States) HEX 2	Alaska	Suborbital	Thermospheric	14 February	Successful
14 February; 09:27	(Canada) Black Brant X		(United States) Poker Flat		(United States) NASA	
14 February; 09:27	(United States) HEX 2	Alaska	Suborbital	Thermospheric	14 February	Successful
14 February; 09:36	(United States) Terrier-Orion		(United States) Poker Flat		(United States) NASA	
14 February; 09:36	(United States) HEX 2	Alaska	Suborbital	Thermospheric	14 February	Successful
14 February; 09:38	(United States) Terrier-Orion		(United States) Poker Flat		(United States) NASA	
14 February; 09:38	(United States) HEX 2	Alaska	Suborbital	Thermospheric	14 February	Successful
25 February	(Iran) Shahab-3		Iran		(Iran) IARI	
25 February	(Iran) Kavosh	INSA	Suborbital	Scientific	25 February	Successful
25 February	First successful Iranian scientific launch					
28 February; 08:39	(Canada) Black Brant XII		(United States) Poker Flat		(United States) NASA	
28 February; 08:39	(United States) CHARM	Dartmouth	Suborbital	Scientific	28 February	Successful
=== March ===
1 March	(India) RH-200SV		(Norway) Andøya		(Norway) Andøya	
1 March	(Norway) Mini-DUSTY 13	Andøya	Suborbital	Technology	1 March	Partial launch failure
1 March	Rocket underperformed and failed to reach correct apogee					
6 March; 00:30	(United States) SR-19		(United States) C-17, Kauai		(United States) US Air Force	
6 March; 00:30		US Army/MDA	Suborbital	Target	6 March	Successful
21 March; 04:27	(United States) Chimera (Minuteman/Minotaur II)		(United States) Vandenberg LF-06		(United States) Orbital Sciences	
21 March; 04:27		US Air Force	Suborbital	Target	21 March	Successful
21 March; 04:27	Tracking demonstration					
30 March	(India) Dhanush		(India) Ship, Indian Ocean		(India) DRDO	
30 March		DRDO	Suborbital	Target	30 March	Successful
30 March	apogee: 100 kilometres (62 mi)					
=== April ===
6 April; 06:42	(Russia) R-17 Elbrus		(United States) Kauai		(United States) US Army	
6 April; 06:42		MDA	Suborbital	Target	6 April	Successful
6 April; 06:42	Tracking demonstration					
12 April; 05:32	(India) Agni-III		(India) Integrated Test Range		(India) IDRDL	
12 April; 05:32	(India) Re-entry vehicle	IDRDL	Suborbital	Missile test	12 April	Successful
26 April; 21:31	(United States) Terrier-Orion	FTM-11 E4	(United States) Kauai		(United States) US Navy	
26 April; 21:31	Target	US Navy	Suborbital	Target	26 April	Successful
26 April; 21:31	Intercepted by SM-3					
26 April; 21:32	(United States) RIM-161 SM-3	FTM-11 E4	(United States) USS Lake Erie, Kauai		(United States) US Navy	
26 April; 21:32	Interceptor	US Navy	Suborbital	ABM test	26 April	Successful
26 April; 21:32	Intercepted Terrier-Orion					
28 April; 14:56	(United States) SpaceLoft XL		(United States) Spaceport America		(United States) UP Aerospace	
28 April; 14:56	(United States) Legacy	Celestis	Suborbital	Space burial	28 April	Successful
28 April; 14:56	(United States) LaunchQuest	CCAT/NALI	Suborbital	Student research	28 April	Successful
28 April; 14:56	(United States) RocketSat II	NASA/Colorado	Suborbital	Technology	28 April	Successful
28 April; 14:56	(United States) Seeds	Epsori Space Systems	Suborbital	Biological	28 April	Successful
28 April; 14:56	(United States) Antimatter/Space^{2}O	MEI	Suborbital	Drink ingredients	28 April	Successful
28 April; 14:56	(United States) Commemorative items	Astrata; RocketFoto; Astrax	Suborbital		28 April	Successful
28 April; 14:56	Recoverable sounding launch to an apogee of 117 kilometres, Legacy included remains of Astronaut Gordon Cooper and actor James Doohan, bad weather delayed recovery					
=== May ===
15 May	(United States) UGM-133 Trident II		(United States) ETR, USS Tennessee		(United States) US Navy	
15 May	(United States) FCET-37	US Navy	Suborbital	SLBM test	15 May	Successful
15 May	(United States) UGM-133 Trident II		(United States) ETR, USS Tennessee		(United States) US Navy	
15 May	(United States) FCET-37	US Navy	Suborbital	SLBM test	15 May	Successful
25 May; 13:15	(United States) UGM-27 Polaris (STARS)	FTG-03	(United States) Kodiak		(United States) Sandia	
25 May; 13:15		MDA	Suborbital	ABM Target	25 May	Failure
25 May; 13:15	FTG-03 target, did not reach correct altitude, GMD-OBV interceptor not launched					
29 May; 10:20	(Russia) RS-24		(Russia) Plesetsk		(Russia) RVSN	
29 May; 10:20		RVSN	Suborbital	Missile test	29 May	Successful
29 May; 10:20	Maiden flight of RS-24 missile					
=== June ===
15 June; 02:45	(United States) Talos-Castor		(Australia) Woomera		(Australia) DSTO	
15 June; 02:45	(Australia) HyShot/HYCAUSE	DSTO	Suborbital	Hypersonic research	15 June	Successful
15 June	(United States) Terrier-Orion		(United States) Kauai		(United States) US Navy	
15 June	(United States) ARAV	US Navy	Suborbital	Target	15 June	Successful
15 June	(United States) Terrier-Orion		(United States) Kauai		(United States) US Navy	
15 June	(United States) ARAV	US Navy	Suborbital	Target	15 June	Successful
20 June	(United States) MEI-F3		(United States) Las Cruces		(United States) MEI	
20 June	(United States) RocketSat III	NASA/Colorado	Suborbital	Technology	20 June	Successful
20 June	(United States) Antimatter/Space^{2}O	MEI	Suborbital	Drink ingredients	20 June	Successful
21 June	(United States) Terrier-Orion		(United States) White Sands		NASA	
21 June	(United States) ST-5000/CACS	NASA/NSROC	Suborbital	Test rocket	21 June	Successful
21 June	(France) M51		(France) Biscarrosse, Submarine		(France) FOST	
21 June		FOST	Suborbital	Missile test	21 June	Successful
23 June; 02:40	(United States) Castor 4B	FTM-12	(United States) Kauai		(United States) US Navy	
23 June; 02:40		US Navy	Suborbital	Target	23 June	Successful
23 June; 02:40	Intercepted by SM-3					
23 June; 02:44	(United States) RIM-161 SM-3	FTM-12	(United States) USS Decatur, Kauai		(United States) US Navy	
23 June; 02:44		US Navy	Suborbital	ABM test	23 June	Successful
23 June; 02:44	Intercepted Castor 4B					
28 June	(Russia) RSM-56 Bulava		(Russia) White Sea, Submarine		(Russia) VMF	
28 June		VMF	Suborbital	Missile test	28 June	Successful
=== July ===
19 July	(Brazil) VSB-30 (306)		(Brazil) Alcântara		(Brazil) AEB	
19 July	(Brazil) Cuma II	INPE	Suborbital	Microgravity	19 July	Partial spacecraft failure
19 July	Parachute or flotation system malfunction prevented recovery					
=== August ===
3 August; 22:51:20	(United States) Terrier-Orion		(Norway) Andøya		(United States) NASA	
3 August; 22:51:20	(United States) MASS 1	NASA/Colorado	Suborbital	Atmospheric	3 August	Successful
3 August; 23:22	(United States) Nike Orion		(Norway) Andøya		(Germany) DLR	
3 August; 23:22	(Norway) (Germany) (France) ECOMA 3	ARR, DLR, IAP	Suborbital	Atmospheric	3 August	Successful
3 August; 23:22	Apogee: 126.5 kilometres (78.6 mi)					
6 August; 22:56	(United States) Terrier-Orion		(Norway) Andøya		(United States) NASA	
6 August; 22:56	(United States) MASS 2	NASA/Colorado	Suborbital	Atmospheric	6 August	Successful
7 August	(Russia) R-29R Volna		(Russia) Pacific Ocean, Delta III submarine		(Russia) VMF	
7 August		VMF	Suborbital	Missile test	7 August	Successful
13 August; 05:45	(Canada) Black Brant IX		(United States) White Sands LC-36		(United States) NASA	
13 August; 05:45	(United States) LIDOS 2	NASA/JHU	Suborbital	Ultraviolet astronomy	13 August	Successful
23 August; 08:31	(United States) Chimera (Minuteman/Minotaur II)		(United States) Vandenberg LF-06		(United States) Orbital Sciences	
23 August; 08:31	(United States) NFIRE 2a	MDA	Suborbital	Target	23 August; 09:01	Successful
23 August; 08:31	Tracking target for the NFIRE spacecraft					
=== September ===
2 September; 10:20	(Japan) S-520		(Japan) Uchinoura		(Japan) JAXA	
2 September; 10:20	(Japan) WIND	JAXA/Kochi	Suborbital	Thermospheric	2 September	Successful
6 September; 21:09	(United States) Terrier-Orion		(United States) Wallops Flight Facility		(United States) NASA	
6 September; 21:09	(United States) PLAYER	NASA	Suborbital	Technology	6 September; 21:19	Successful
13 September; 05:50	Taiwan Sounding Rocket	Sounding Rocket VI	(Taiwan) Jiu Peng Air Base		(Taiwan) NSPO	
13 September; 05:50	(Taiwan) Reaction control system, recovery capsule	NSPO/NCU	Suborbital	Technology test	13 September	Successful
13 September; 05:50	Apogee: ~280 km (174 mi). Recovery capsule successfully splashed down, but was not recovered due to weather conditions.					
28 September; 20:16	(United States) Polaris (STARS)	FTG-03a	(United States) Kodiak		(United States) Sandia	
28 September; 20:16		MDA	Suborbital	Target	28 September	Successful
28 September; 20:16	Intercepted by Ground Based Interceptor					
28 September; 20:18	(United States) Ground Based Interceptor	FTG-03a	(United States) Vandenberg LF-23		(United States) MDA	
28 September; 20:18		MDA	Suborbital	ABM test	28 September	Successful
28 September; 20:18	Intercepted Polaris (STARS)					
=== October ===
5 October; 05:50	(India) Agni-I		(India) Integrated Test Range		(India) IDRDL	
5 October; 05:50		IDRDL	Suborbital	Missile test	5 October	Successful
29 October	(Russia) RS-18 UR-100N		(Kazakhstan) Baikonur		(Russia) RVSN	
29 October		RVSN	Suborbital	Missile test	29 October	Successful
30 October; 04:12:52	(Canada) Black Brant IX		(United States) Wallops Flight Facility Pad 1		(United States) NASA	
30 October; 04:12:52	(United States) EARLE	NASA/Texas	Suborbital	Ionospheric	30 October; 04:26:17	Successful
=== November ===
6 November; 18:00	(Canada) Black Brant IX		(United States) White Sands LC-36		(United States) NASA	
6 November; 18:00	(United States) EUNIS	NASA	Suborbital	Solar	6 November	Successful
=== December ===
8 December	(Russia) RT-2UTTH Topol-M		(Russia) Kapustin Yar		(Russia) RVSN	
8 December		RVSN	Suborbital	Missile test	8 December	Successful
10 December; 09:00:00	(Canada) Black Brant XII		(Norway) Andøya		(United States) NASA	
10 December; 09:00:00	(United States) TRICE-High	NASA/UoI	Suborbital	Electrodynamics	10 December	Successful
10 December; 09:02:00	(Canada) Black Brant XII		(Norway) Andøya		(United States) NASA	
10 December; 09:02:00	(United States) TRICE-Low	NASA/UoI	Suborbital	Electrodynamics	10 December	Successful
17 December; 22:05	(United States) Castor 4B	JFTM-1	(United States) Kauai		(United States) US Navy	
17 December; 22:05	(United States) Mock warhead	US Navy	Suborbital	Target	17 December	Successful
17 December; 22:05	Intercepted by SM-3					
17 December; 22:08	(United States) RIM-161 SM-3	JFTM-1	(Japan) JDS Kongō		(Japan) JMSDF	
17 December; 22:08		JMSDF	Suborbital	ABM test	17 December	Successful
17 December; 22:08	Intercepted Castor 4B, first Japanese ABM test (Using American technology)					
17 December	(Russia) R-29RM Sineva (RSM-54)		(Russia) Barents Sea, K-114		(Russia) VMF	
17 December	(Russia) Re-entry vehicles	VMF	Suborbital	Missile test	17 December	Successful
17 December	Multiple re-entry vehicles, impacted Kura Test Range					
17 December	(Brazil) VS-30		(Brazil) Barreira do Inferno		(Brazil) AEB	
17 December	(Brazil) (Argentina) Angicos	AEB/CONAE	Suborbital	Microgravity	17 December	Successful
25 December; 10:00	(Russia) R-29RM Sineva (RSM-54)		(Russia) Barents Sea, K-114		(Russia) VMF	
25 December; 10:00	(Russia) Re-entry vehicles	VMF	Suborbital	Missile test	25 December	Successful
25 December; 10:00	Multiple re-entry vehicles, Impacted Kura Test Range					
25 December; 13:10	(Russia) RS-24		(Russia) Plesetsk		(Russia) RVSN	
25 December; 13:10	(Russia) Re-entry vehicles	RVSN	Suborbital	Missile test	25 December	Successful
25 December; 13:10	Multiple re-entry vehicles					

- ← Jan
- Feb
- Mar
- Apr
- May
- Jun
- Jul
- Aug
- Sep
- Oct
- Nov
- Dec →

== Deep Space Rendezvous ==
Date (GMT)	Spacecraft	Event	Remarks
13 January	Cassini	23rd flyby of Titan	Closest approach: 950 kilometres (590 mi)
29 January	Cassini	24th flyby of Titan	Closest approach: 2,775 kilometres (1,724 mi)
22 February	Cassini	25th flyby of Titan	Closest approach: 953 kilometres (592 mi)
25 February	Rosetta	Flyby of Mars	Gravity assist
28 February	New Horizons	Flyby of Jupiter	Gravity assist
10 March	Cassini	26th flyby of Titan	Closest approach: 956 kilometres (594 mi)
26 March	Cassini	27th flyby of Titan	Closest approach: 953 kilometres (592 mi)
10 April	Cassini	28th flyby of Titan	Closest approach: 951 kilometres (591 mi)
26 April	Cassini	29th flyby of Titan	Closest approach: 951 kilometres (591 mi)
12 May	Cassini	30th flyby of Titan	Closest approach: 950 kilometres (590 mi)
28 May	Cassini	31stflyby of Titan	Closest approach: 2,425 kilometres (1,507 mi)
5 June	MESSENGER	2nd flyby of Venus	Gravity assist; Closest approach: 338 kilometres (210 mi)
13 June	Cassini	32nd flyby of Titan	Closest approach: 950 kilometres (590 mi)
29 June	Cassini	33rd flyby of Titan	Closest approach: 1,942 kilometres (1,207 mi)
19 July	Cassini	34thflyby of Titan	Closest approach: 1,302 kilometres (809 mi)
30 August	Cassini	Flyby of Rhea	Closest approach: 5,100 kilometres (3,200 mi)
31 August	Cassini	35th flyby of Titan	Closest approach: 3,227 kilometres (2,005 mi)
10 September	Cassini	Flyby of Iapetus	Closest approach: 1,000 kilometres (620 mi)
2 October	Cassini	36th flyby of Titan	Closest approach: 950 kilometres (590 mi)
3 October	Kaguya	Selenocentric orbit injection	
5 November	Chang'e 1	Selenocentric orbit injection	
13 November	Rosetta	2nd flyby of the Earth	Mistaken for asteroid, given the designation 2007 VN84
19 November	Cassini	37th flyby of Titan	Closest approach: 950 kilometres (590 mi)
5 December	Cassini	38th flyby of Titan	Closest approach: 1,300 kilometres (810 mi)
20 December	Cassini	39th flyby of Titan	Closest approach: 953 kilometres (592 mi)
31 December	Deep Impact (EPOXI)	Flyby of Earth	Closest approach: 15,566 kilometres (9,672 mi)

Distant, non-targeted flybys of Dione, Enceladus, Mimas, Tethys and Titan by Cassini occurred throughout the year.

== EVAs ==
Start date/time	Duration	End time	Spacecraft	Crew	Function	Remarks
31 January; 15:14	7 hours 55 minutes	23:09	Expedition 14; ISS Quest	(United States) Michael Lopez-Alegria (United States) Sunita Williams	Reconfigured Destiny cooling system, connected SSPTS, secured P6 starboard radiator, disconnected EAS.	
4 February; 13:38	7 hours 11 minutes	20:49	Expedition 14; ISS Quest	(United States) Michael Lopez-Alegria (United States) Sunita Williams	Completed Destiny cooling system reconfiguration and EAS disconnection, photographed P6 inboard solar array, continued SSPTS installation.	
8 February; 13:26	6 hours 40 minutes	20:06	Expedition 14; ISS Quest	(United States) Michael Lopez-Alegria (United States) Sunita Williams	Removed and jettisoned P3 thermal covers, install P3 attachment point, remove P5 launch restraints, continued SSPTS installation.	
22 February; 10:27	6 hours 18 minutes	16:45	Expedition 14; ISS Pirs	(Russia) Mikhail Tyurin (United States) Michael Lopez-Alegria	Retracted an antenna at the aft port of the Zvezda, photographed a satellite navigation antenna, and replaced a Russian materials experiment, inspected and photographed an antenna for the ATV, photographed a German robotics experiment, and inspected, remated, and photographed hardware connectors.	
30 May; 19:05	5 hours 25 minutes	31 May; 00:30	Expedition 15; ISS Pirs	(Russia) Fyodor Yurchikhin (Russia) Oleg Kotov	Installed Service Module Debris Protection (SMDP) panels and rerouted a Global Positioning System antenna cable.	
6 June; 14:23	5 hours 37 minutes	20:00	Expedition 15; ISS Pirs	(Russia) Fyodor Yurchikhin (Russia) Oleg Kotov	Installed a section of Ethernet cable on the Zarya module, installed additional Service Module Debris Protection (SMDP) panels on Zvezda, and deployed a Russian scientific experiment.	
11 June; 20:02	6 hours 15 minutes	12 June; 02:17	STS-117; ISS Quest	(United States) James F. Reilly (United States) John D. Olivas	Began the S3/S4 Truss installation.	
13 June; 18:28	7 hours 16 minutes	14 June; 01:44	STS-117; ISS Quest	(United States) Patrick G. Forrester (United States) Steven Swanson	Assisted in retraction of the solar panels on the P6 Truss. Completed the S3/S4 truss installation. Partial failure due to the S3/S4 SARJ motor control circuits being wired in reverse, so some launch restraints were left in place to prevent the possibility of undesired rotation.	
15 June; 17:24	7 hours 58 minutes	16 June; 01:22	STS-117; ISS Quest	(United States) James F. Reilly (United States) John D. Olivas	Repaired the Orbital Maneuvering System (OMS) pod thermal blanket, finished the P6 solar array retraction, and installed a hydrogen ventilation valve onto Destiny.	
17 June; 16:25	6 hours 29 minutes	22:54	STS-117; ISS Quest	(United States) Patrick G. Forrester (United States) Steven Swanson	Retrieved a television camera and its support structure from an ESP attached to Quest, and installed it on the S3 truss, verified the Drive Lock Assembly (DLA) 2 configuration, and removed the last six SARJ launch restraints. Installed a computer network cable on Unity, opened the hydrogen vent valve on Destiny, and tethered two orbital debris shield panels on Zvezda.	
23 July; 10:25	7 hours 41 minutes	18:06	Expedition 15; ISS Quest	(United States) Clayton Anderson (Russia) Fyodor Yurchikhin	Replaced components for the Mobile Transporter's redundant power system, jettisoned an ammonia tank and flight support equipment, and cleaned the Common Berthing Mechanism (CBM) on the nadir port of Unity.	
11 August; 16:28	6 hours 17 minutes	23:45	STS-118; ISS Quest	(United States) Richard Mastracchio (Canada) Dafydd Williams	Attached the Starboard 5 (S5) segment of the station's truss, and retracted the forward heat-rejecting radiator from the station's Port 6 (P6) truss.	
13 August; 15:32	6 hours 28 minutes	22:00	STS-118; ISS Quest	(United States) Richard Mastracchio (Canada) Dafydd Williams	Removed the new Control Moment Gyroscope (CMG) from the shuttle's payload bay and installed it onto the Z1 truss. Installed the failed CMG onto an External Stowage Platform (ESP-2).	
15 August; 14:38	5 hours 28 minutes	20:05	STS-118; ISS Quest	(United States) Richard Mastracchio (United States) Clayton Anderson	Relocated two CETA carts around the Mobile Transporter and an antenna base from the P6 truss to P1, and installed a new transponder and signal processor for an S-band communications upgrade.	Mastracchio noted a hole on the thumb of his left glove and returned to the airlock as a precautionary measure.
18 August; 14:17	5 hours 2 minutes	19:02	STS-118; ISS Quest	(Canada) Dafydd Williams (United States) Clayton Anderson	Retrieved Materials International Space Station Experiment (MISSE) containers 3 and 4, installed the Orbiter Boom Sensor System (OBSS) Boom Stand, installed an External Wireless Instrumentation System (EWIS) antenna, and secured Z1 gimbal locks.	
26 October; 10:02	6 hours 14 minutes	16:16	STS-120; ISS Quest	(United States) Scott E. Parazynski (United States) Douglas H. Wheelock	Installed the new Harmony module in its temporary location, retrieved the S-Band Antenna Support Assembly, and prepared for the relocation of the P6 truss by disconnecting fluid lines on the P6/Z1 truss segments.	
28 October; 09:32	6 hours 33 minutes	16:05	STS-120; ISS Quest	(United States) Scott E. Parazysnki (United States) Daniel M. Tani	Disconnected the Z1-to-P6 umbilicals, detached P6 from Z1, configured the S1 radiator, installed handrails onto Harmony, and inspected the S4 starboard Solar Alpha Rotary Joint (SARJ).	
30 October; 08:45	7 hours 8 minutes	15:53	STS-120; ISS Quest	(United States) Scott E. Parazysnki (United States) Douglas H. Wheelock	Attached P6 to P5, installed P6/P5 umbilical connections, reconfigured S1 following its redeployment, and inspected the port SARJ.	
3 November; 10:03	7 hours 19 minutes	17:22	STS-120; ISS Quest	(United States) Scott E. Parazysnki (United States) Douglas H. Wheelock	Inspection and repair of the P6 solar array.	
9 November; 09:54	6 hours 55 minutes	16:49	Expedition 16; ISS Quest	(United States) Peggy Whitson (Russia) Yuri Malenchenko	Disconnected and stored the Station-to-Shuttle Power Transfer System cables, stored the PMA-2 umbilical, and stowed a Harmony node avionics umbilical into a temporary position.	
20 November; 10:10	7 hours 16 minutes	17:26	Expedition 16; ISS Quest	(United States) Peggy Whitson (United States) Daniel M. Tani	External configuration of PMA-2 and Harmony: Fluid, electrical, and data lines attached, avionics lines hooked up, heater cables attached, and relocated a fluid tray.	
24 November; 09:50	7 hours 4 minutes	16:54	Expedition 16; ISS Quest	(United States) Peggy Whitson (United States) Daniel M. Tani	Completion of fluid, electrical, and data line hookups for PMA-2 and Harmony. Loop B Fluid Tray connected to the port side of the Destiny laboratory. Inspected and photographed the starboard Solar Alpha Rotary Joint (SARJ) to assist with troubleshooting on the ground.	
18 December; 09:50	6 hours 56 minutes	16:46	Expedition 16; ISS Quest	(United States) Peggy Whitson (United States) Daniel M. Tani	Inspected the S4 starboard Solar Alpha Rotary Joint (SARJ), and a Beta Gimbal Assembly (BGA).	100th EVA in support of the ISS. Whitson became the female astronaut with the most EVAs and the most time spent in EVA.

== Orbital launch statistics ==
=== By country ===
For the purposes of this section, the yearly tally of orbital launches by country assigns each flight to the country of origin of the rocket, not to the launch services provider or the spaceport.

Country	Launches	Successes	Failures	Partial failures
China	10	10	0	0
France	6	6	0	0
India	3	2	0	1
Israel	1	1	0	0
Japan	2	2	0	0
Russia	22	21	1	0
Ukraine	5	4	1	0
United States	19	17	1	1
World	68	63	3	2

=== By rocket ===
- Ariane 5
- Atlas V
- Delta II
- Delta IV
- Delta IV Heavy
- H-IIA
- Long March 2
- Long March 3
- Long March 4
- PSLV
- Molniya-M
- Soyuz-U
- Soyuz-FG
- Kosmos-3M
- Dnepr
- Space Shuttle
- Proton-K
- Proton-M
- Zenit-2M
- Zenit-3SL
- Others

==== By family ====
Family	Country	Launches	Successes	Failures	Partial failures	Remarks
Ariane	France	6	6	0	0	
Atlas	United States	4	3	0	1	
Delta	United States	9	9	0	0	
Falcon	United States	1	0	1	0	
GSLV	India	1	0	0	1	
H-II	Japan	2	2	0	0	
Long March	China	10	10	0	0	
Minotaur	United States	1	1	0	0	
Pegasus	United States	1	1	0	0	
PSLV	India	2	2	0	0	
R-7	Russia	12	12	0	0	
R-14	Russia	3	3	0	0	
R-36	Ukraine	3	3	0	0	
Shavit 2	Israel	1	1	0	0	
Space Shuttle	United States	3	3	0	0	
Universal Rocket	Russia	7	6	1	0	
Zenit	Ukraine	2	1	1	0	

==== By type ====
Rocket	Country	Family	Launches	Successes	Failures	Partial failures	Remarks
Ariane 5	France	Ariane	6	6	0	0	
Atlas V	United States	Atlas	4	3	0	1	
Delta II	United States	Delta	8	8	0	0	
Delta IV	United States	Delta	1	1	0	0	
Dnepr	Ukraine	R-36	3	3	0	0	
Falcon 1	United States	Falcon	1	0	1	0	
GSLV	India	GSLV	1	0	0	1	
H-IIA	Japan	H-II	2	2	0	0	
Kosmos	Russia	R-12/R-14	3	3	0	0	
Long March 2	China	Long March	2	2	0	0	
Long March 3	China	Long March	6	6	0	0	
Long March 4	China	Long March	2	2	0	0	
Minotaur I	United States	Minotaur	1	1	0	0	
Molniya	Russia	R-7	1	1	0	0	
Pegasus	United States	Pegasus	1	1	0	0	
Proton	Russia	Universal Rocket	7	6	1	0	
PSLV	India	PSLV	2	2	0	0	
Shavit	Israel	Shavit	1	1	0	0	
Soyuz	Russia	R-7	11	11	0	0	
Space Shuttle	United States	Space Shuttle	3	3	0	0	
Zenit	Ukraine	Zenit	2	1	1	0	

==== By configuration ====
Rocket	Country	Type	Launches	Successes	Failures	Partial failures	Remarks
Ariane 5 ECA	France	Ariane 5	4	4	0	0	
Ariane 5 GS	France	Ariane 5	2	2	0	0	
Atlas V 401	United States	Atlas V	3	2	0	1	
Atlas V 421	United States	Atlas V	1	1	0	0	Maiden flight
Delta II 7420	United States	Delta II	2	2	0	0	
Delta II 7920	United States	Delta II	1	1	0	0	
Delta II 7925	United States	Delta II	4	4	0	0	
Delta II 7925H	United States	Delta II	1	1	0	0	Final flight
Delta IV Heavy	United States	Delta IV	1	1	0	0	
Dnepr	Ukraine	Dnepr	3	3	0	0	
Falcon 1	United States	Falcon 1	1	0	1	0	
GSLV Mk I	India	GSLV	1	0	0	1	Final flight
H-IIA 2022	Japan	H-IIA	1	1	0	0	
H-IIA 2024	Japan	H-IIA	1	1	0	0	
Kosmos-3M	Russia	Kosmos	3	3	0	0	
Long March 2C	China	Long March 2	1	1	0	0	
Long March 2D	China	Long March 2	1	1	0	0	
Long March 3A	China	Long March 3	4	4	0	0	
Long March 3B	China	Long March 3	1	1	0	0	
Long March 3B/E	China	Long March 3	1	1	0	0	
Long March 4B	China	Long March 4	1	1	0	0	
Long March 4C	China	Long March 4	1	1	0	0	
Minotaur I	United States	Minotaur I	1	1	0	0	
Molniya-M / 2BL	Russia	Molniya	1	1	0	0	
Pegasus-XL	United States	Pegasus	1	1	0	0	
Proton-K / DM-2	Russia	Proton	1	1	0	0	
Proton-M / DM-2	Russia	Proton	1	1	0	0	Maiden flight
Proton-M / Briz-M	Russia	Proton	5	4	1	0	
PSLV-G	India	PSLV	1	1	0	0	
PSLV-CA	India	PSLV	1	1	0	0	Maiden flight
Shavit-2	Israel	Shavit	1	1	0	0	Maiden flight
Soyuz-FG	Russia	Soyuz	2	2	0	0	
Soyuz-FG / Fregat	Russia	Soyuz	3	3	0	0	
Soyuz-U	Russia	Soyuz	6	6	0	0	
Space Shuttle	United States	Space Shuttle	3	3	0	0	
Zenit-2M	Ukraine	Zenit	1	1	0	0	Maiden flight
Zenit-3SL	Ukraine	Zenit	1	0	1	0	

=== By launch site ===
- Jiuquan
- Taiyuan
- Xichang
- Kourou
- Satish Dhawan
- Ocean Odyssey
- Palmachim
- Tanegashima
- Baikonur
- Kwajalein
- Dombarovsky
- Plesetsk
- Cape Canaveral
- Kennedy
- MARS
- Vandenberg

Site	Country	Launches	Successes	Failures	Partial failures	Remarks
Baikonur	Kazakhstan	20	19	1	0	
Cape Canaveral	United States	10	9	0	1	
Dombarovsky	Russia	1	1	0	0	
Jiuquan	China	1	1	0	0	
Kennedy	United States	3	3	0	0	
Kourou	France	6	6	0	0	
Kwajalein	Marshall Islands	1	0	1	0	
MARS	United States	1	1	0	0	
Ocean Odyssey	(United Nations) International	1	0	1	0	Damaged by explosion
Palmachim	Israel	1	1	0	0	
Plesetsk	Russia	5	5	0	0	
Satish Dhawan	India	3	2	0	1	
Taiyuan	China	3	3	0	0	
Tanegashima	Japan	2	2	0	0	
Vandenberg	United States	4	4	0	0	One launch used Stargazer aircraft
Xichang	China	6	6	0	0	
Total		68	63	3	2	

=== By orbit ===
- Transatmospheric
- Low Earth
- Low Earth (ISS)
- Low Earth (SSO)
- Low Earth (retrograde)
- Medium Earth
- Geosychronous
  (transfer)
- Inclined GSO
- High Earth
- Heliocentric

Orbital regime	Launches	Successes	Failures	Accidentally achieved	Remarks
Transatmospheric	0	0	0	0	
Low Earth	37	36	1	0	9 to ISS
Medium Earth / Molniya	7	7	0	0	
Geosynchronous / GTO	19	17	2	0	
High Earth / Lunar transfer	3	3	0	0	
Heliocentric / Planetary transfer	2	2	0	0	
Total	68	65	3	0	
