= PSLV C7 =

Polar Satellite Launch Vehicle mission by ISRO

PSLV-C7
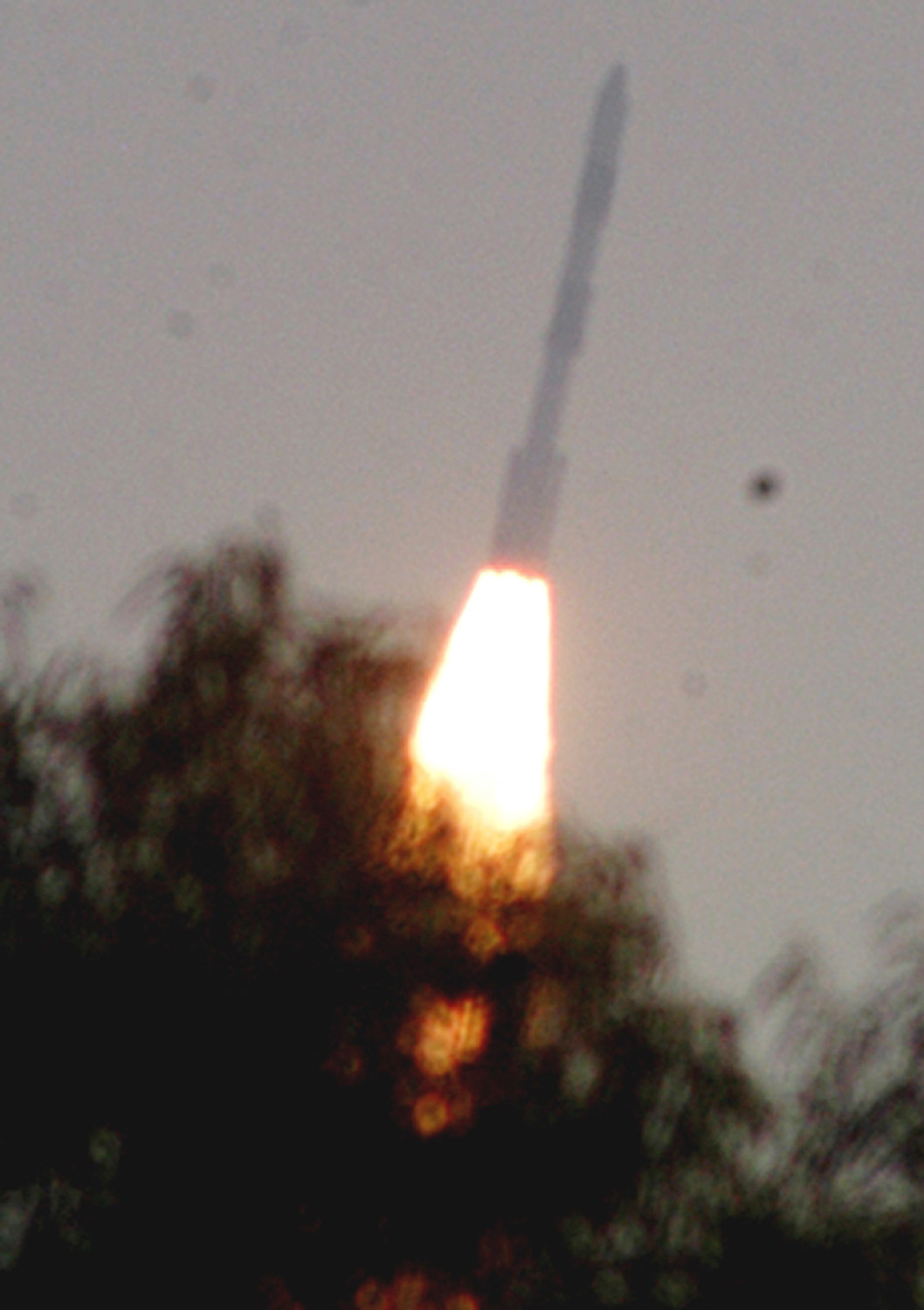

PSLV launch
- Launch: 1 October 2007, 03:54 UTC
- Operator: ISRO
- Pad: Sriharikota
- Payload: (India) Cartosat-2 (India) SRE-1 (Indonesia) LAPAN-TUBsat (Argentina) Pehuensat-1
- Outcome: Success

PSLV launches

PSLV-C7 was a mission of the Indian Polar Satellite Launch Vehicle (PSLV) rocket, launched on January 10, 2007, by the Indian Space Research Organisation (ISRO) from the Satish Dhawan Space Centre at Sriharikota, Andhra Pradesh.

The mission consisted of Space Capsule Recovery Experiment, ISRO's first reentry mission, along with Cartosat-2, an Earth observation satellite, LAPAN-TUBsat, Indonesia's first remote sensing satellite, and Pehuensat-1, an Argentine educational satellite.

The mission was an important mission is the history of PSLV, because it had many new additions to the rocket. The mission also had the first use of Dual Launch Adapter, (DLA).

== Speciality and Major Changes ==
- First reentry Experiment of ISRO
- Altitude based Day of Launch (DOL) wind biased steering program during Open Loop Guidance
- Deletion of SITVC system of airlit strap-on.
- PS1 SITVC Injectant loading reduced by 500 kg.
- Use of externally fabricated nozzles for the two motors.
- Use of Dual Launch Adapter (DLA)
- First use of 2 ton liquid stage for fourth stage.
- Video Imaging System to capture payloads (Cartosat-2 & SRE) and DLA separation events.
- Internal vehicle length increased by 2.25 m with the Introduction of DLA.
- Flight sequence modified for multiple satellite/DLA separation.

== Launch ==
This was the tenth Launch of the PSLV rocket. It launched at 03:53 UTC on January 10, 2007, from Sriharikota.

- The first stage, of six solid propellant strap-ones, of HTPB fuel, ignited at Launch. They burned for 113 seconds and got disposed.
- The second stage of UH 25 and N_{2}O_{4} fuel, got ignited at 113 seconds. This was followed by a Heat shield separation and separation of PS2 at 264 seconds.
- PS3 ignited at 265 seconds and separated at 513 seconds.
- PS4 ignited at 533 seconda and cut off at 942 seconds.
- Cartosat-2 separated at 979 seconds at an altitude of 639 km.
- Dual Launch Adapter separated at 1024 seconds
- SRE separated at 1099 seconds at 641 km altitude.
- LAPAN-TUBsat separated at 1169 seconds at an altitude of 642 km.

== Payloads ==
=== SRE ===
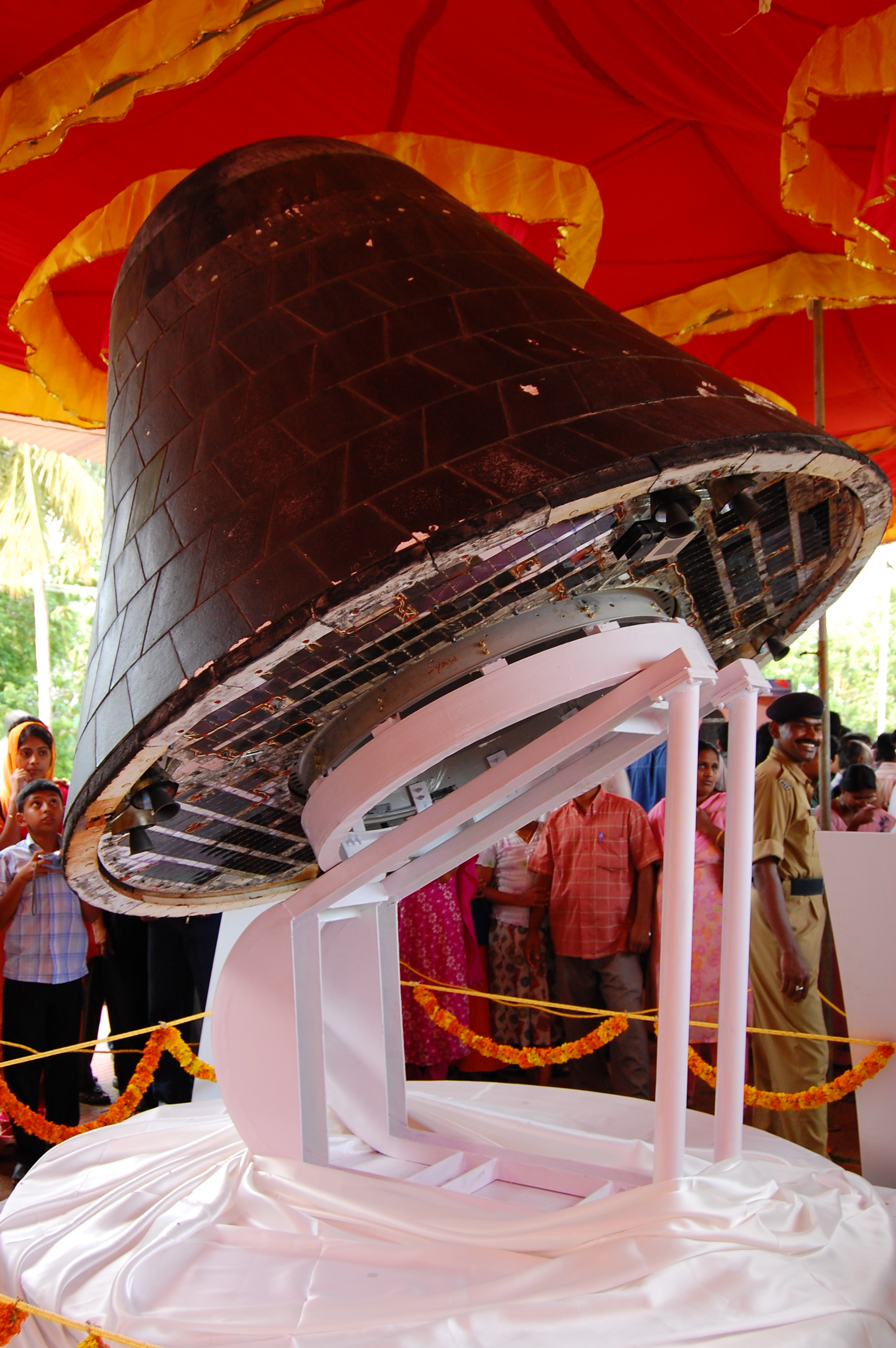
Space Capsule RecoveryExperiment

The Space Capsule Recovery Experiment (SCRE or more commonly SRE or SRE-1) is an Indian experimental spacecraft. It's the first step in their Gaganyaan program of ISRO which aim to send humans to space. It orbited the Earth for 12 days before re-entering the Earth's atmosphere and splashing down into the Bay of Bengal at 04:16 UTC on January 22. It also did Research on reusable Thermal Protection System, navigation, guidance and control, hypersonic aero-thermodynamics, management of communication blackout, deceleration and flotation system and tested recovery operations.

=== Cartosat-2 ===
Cartosat-2 is an Earth observation satellite in a Sun-synchronous orbit and the second of the Cartosat series of satellites. It consists of a panchromatic (PAN) camera that take black and white pictures of the Earth in the visible region of the electromagnetic spectrum. It can produce images 1 metre in resolution.

=== LAPAN-TUBsat and Pehuensat-1 ===
Pehuensat-1 is an Argentinian amateur Radio satellite created by students of Universidad Nacional del Comahue. LAPAN-TUBsat is an Indonesian micro satellite, weighing 56 Kilograms, orbiting at 630 kilometers above Indonesia. This satellite travels through polar orbit across the archipelago two or three times each day.

== Dual Launch Adapter ==
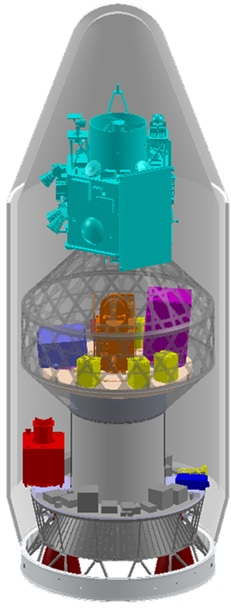
Dual Launch Adapter can be used to integrate 2 or more satellites on a single Launch. Note: This shows the DLA from the later PSLV-C40 mission

It's an adapter designed to carry medium class (~1000 kg) payloads in PSLV. It consists of a Carbon Fibre composite, arranged in Honeycomb sandwich shells. With an aluminum core. It consists of three structures, DLA-U (upper), DLA-M (middle), and DLA-L (lower). DLA is mounted of the fourth stage of PS4, by bolting the DLA-L with Payload Adapter (PLA). DLA-U carries Cartosat-2, and SRE is connected to PLA via a band clamp separation system. DLA includes cutouts in which electrical connectors, sensors, cooling system of the satellite etc. can be mounted.

== Reactions and Honours ==
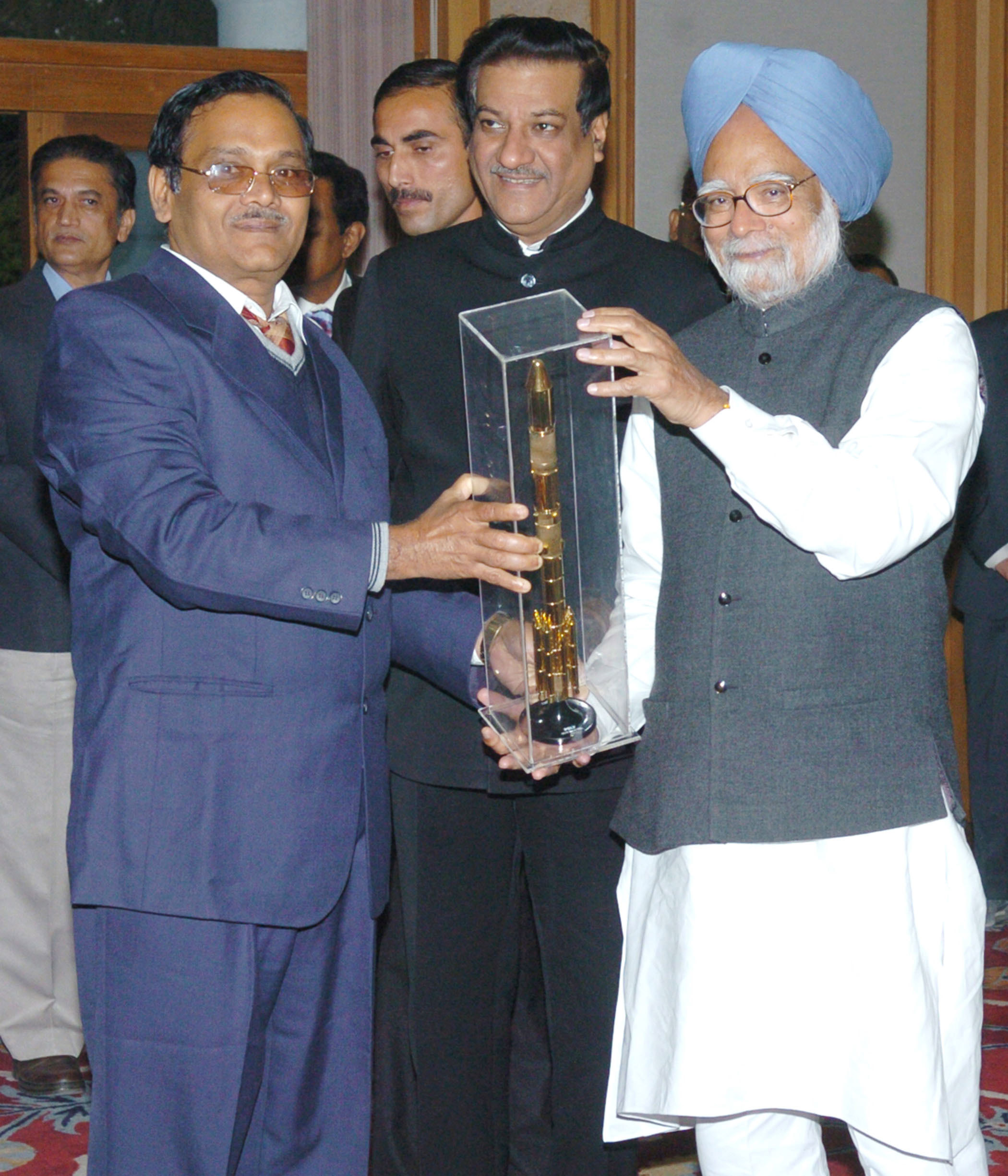
The Prime Minister, Dr. Manmohan Singh, along with Minister of State in the Prime Minister's Office, Shri Prithviraj Chauhan, being presented a model of the Polar Satellite Launch Vehicle (PSLV-C7), in New Delhi (January 17, 2007)

Team of ISRO scientists who were part of the mission were awarded the prestigious team achievement award of the International Academy of Astronautics. The award was given to them at Glasgow, on September 28.

ISRO Chairman Madhavan Nair told the press "We've done it perfectly", after the launch. Dr V Jayaraman, director, earth observation system, said "We believe we can offer our products at one-fifth of the cost of our competitors, The size of the international market (for such images) is about $300 million-$500 million."

== Team ==
The PSLV-C7 team was led by

- N Narayana Murthy, Project Director, Cartosat-2
- George Koshy, Vehicle Director, PSLV-C7
- Cartosat-2 by M Krishnaswamy, Programme Director, IRS.
- SRE-1 by A Subramoniam
- Ground support team by S K Shivakumar, Director, ISTRAC.
- Overall co-ordination by P S Sastry, Director, LVPO at ISRO Headquarters, Bangalore.
