= RocketSat =

The NASA SpaceGrant Consortium at the University of Colorado at Boulder has sponsored many small space reaching missions including 3CS, CX, DINO, DANDE, and RocketSat. RocketSat is a small payload which launched on a sounding rocket provided by the UP Aerospace corporation in October 2006. This first launch for the University of Colorado RocketSat program also marks the nascent flight of the UP Aerospace corporation, and the inaugural launch for the Southwest Regional Spaceport near Upham, New Mexico.

== Purpose ==
RocketSat was conceived as the framework for a sister class to the BalloonSat projects course Gateway to Space, already offered to freshman engineering students at the University of Colorado. The first RocketSat payload serves as the proof of concept for future classes. This original payload consists of various instrumentation to record Geiger radiation counts, microwave radiation intensity, pressure, temperature, and acceleration on three axes in both high-range with low precision and low-range with high precision. An I²C EEPROM and two linked BrainStems (via the I2C bus) are used to record the myriad of data collected by the sensors. Due to the limited BrainStem speed, and limited EEPROM storage space, the data collected on this RocketSat flight is being recorded at 4 Hertz.

The RocketSat logo

Fully assembled RocketSat payload

Accelerometer board close-up
