= Chinese-American Chemical Society =

Founded in 1981, the Chinese American Chemical Society (CACS) is a nonprofit, professional organization that has neither national nor regional political affiliation. Membership is open to professionals and students in chemistry, chemical engineering, and related fields, as well as to individuals and corporations supporting the objectives of the society. Currently, CACS has three local chapters in North America.
