= Lapan-TUBsat =

Lapan- TUBSat is Indonesia’s first remote sensing satellite, made by the experts from National Institute of Aeronautics and Space (Lembaga Penerbangan dan Antariksa Nasional, Lapan) and Technische Universität Berlin (TUB) Germany. The uses of the satellite are for Indonesian natural resources observation and weather forecast for the Indonesian area. Lapan-TUB Sat was launched aboard PSLV-C7 on 1 January 2007 from the Indian space centre in Sriharikota and still functioning well after the fifth birthday.

== History ==
Lapan-TUBSat is a micro satellite, weight of 56 Kilograms, and orbit at 630 kilometers above Indonesia. This satellite passes the polar orbital (from one polar to another) and across the archipelago for two or three times each day. Image of Lapan- TUBsat, now can only be received by Lapan ground station in Rumpin, West Java, called remote sensing image for West Indonesia. Afterward, ground station in Pare Pare, South Celebes and Biak Island, Papua, will be built to receive image from remote sensing satellite for Middle and East Indonesia.

Before this discovery, image input and satellite data for the observation need, are received from other countries’ natural resources satellites, such as Landsat and NOAA (United States), SPOT (France), Radarsat (Canada), JRS (Japan), and also Feng Yun (China). Lapan as the institute that is made to fulfill this need could not fix the satellites’ orbital tracks, its coverage area, and time limit of the satellites rotation above Indonesia.

Now, the Lapan-TUBsat can relay topography images from several regions in Indonesia. At the test phase, the satellite was aimed to Strait of Madura, North Java, Bangka Maritime and Strait of Malaya. Those areas classified as catastrophes areas of accident and flood. This point is consistent with the Lapan-TUBsat mission, giving attention to potentially dangerous areas in Indonesia.
