= Pehuensat-1 =

Argentinian Satellite

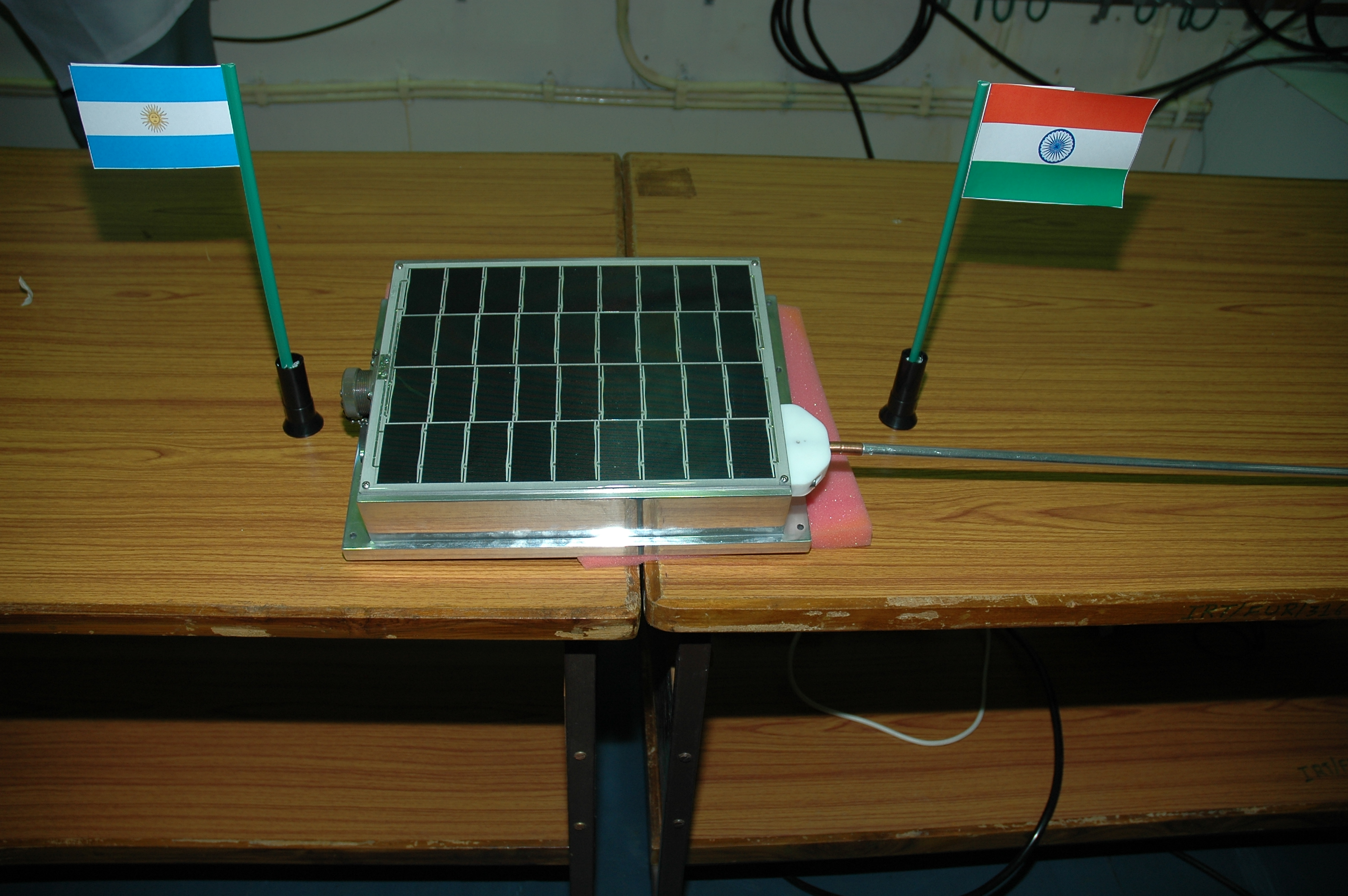
- Mission type: Amateur Radio
- Operator: Universidad Nacional del Comahue, Asociación Argentina de Tecnología Espacial, AMSAT Argentina
- COSPAR ID: 2007-001D
- SATCAT no.: 29712
- Website: https://investigadores.uncoma.edu.ar/AplicacionesEspaciales/pehuen.htm

Spacecraft properties
- Launch mass: 6 kg

Start of mission
- Launch date: January 10, 10:00 UTC
- Launch site: Satish Dhawan PSLV C7

End of mission
- Decay date: 16 January 2023

Orbital parameters
- Regime: LEO
- Periapsis altitude: 596 km
- Apoapsis altitude: 615 km
- Period: 96.7 min

Pehuensat-1 (PehuenSat 1, PO 63, PehuenSat-OSCAR 63, NanoPehuenSat) was a satellite built entirely in Argentina with educational objectives. It was launched on January 10, 2007 aboard a rocket from the Satish Dhawan Space Center on the east coast of India. The assembly took five years and was carried out by teachers and students of the National University of Comahue.

It was named Pehuensat-1 in reference to the pehuén, an ancient and native tree of the Andean Patagonian forests identified with the provinces in which the university has its academic headquarters.

== Details ==
It was built by 17 teachers and 44 students from the Faculty of Engineering of the University of Comahue (Neuquén). In October 2006, the satellite was taken to the launch center in Shriharikota (India), by the Argentine space researcher Pablo de León, who became known months ago when he presented a prototype of a space suit designed for trips to Mars.

It was launched at 9:23 a.m. Indian time (1:53 a.m. Argentine time) on the Indian Polar Satellite Launch Vehicle PSLV C7 rocket.

After 20 minutes of travel, Pehuensat-1 reached its orbit, where it remained for several years.

The satellite weighed 6 kilograms, travelled at an altitude of about 640 kilometers and orbited the Earth at a speed of 27,000 kilometres per hour (17,000 mph) (about 7.5 km/s (4.7 mi/s)). It had a space-type aluminum case structure and solar panels on one of the faces. The electronics were made up of a transmitter, a computer and two battery packs that were recharged with solar energy. In addition the satellite had an antenna in charge of transmitting the satellite parameters to the ground.

Pehuensat-1 could withstand temperatures in space of −120 °C (−184 °F) (every time it passed through the Earth's shadow) and up to 100 °C (212 °F) (facing the Sun). It was useful to high schools and universities around the world, because it transmitted its data in multiple languages to amateur radio receivers. When flying over an area, the satellite could be heard by tuning to the 145.825 MHz frequency in the 2-meter band in FM mode. The Pehuensat-1 satellite transmitted its data in Spanish, English and Hindi.
