= Cartosat-2 =

Indian Earth observation satellite

- Names: IRS-P7; CartoSat-2AT
- Mission type: Earth observation
- Operator: ISRO
- COSPAR ID: 2007-001B
- SATCAT no.: 29710
- Website: https://www.isro.gov.in/
- Mission duration: 5 years (planned); 12 years (achieved)

Spacecraft properties
- Spacecraft: IRS-P7
- Bus: IRS-2
- Manufacturer: Indian Space Research Organisation
- Launch mass: 680 kg (1,500 lb)
- Power: 900 watts

Start of mission
- Launch date: 10 January 2007, 03:57:00 UTC
- Rocket: Polar Satellite Launch Vehicle (PSLV C7)
- Launch site: Satish Dhawan Space Centre, FLP
- Contractor: Indian Space Research Organisation
- Entered service: 2007

End of mission
- Deactivated: 2019
- Decay date: 14 Feb 2024

Orbital parameters
- Reference system: Geocentric orbit
- Regime: Sun-synchronous orbit
- Perigee altitude: 621 km (386 mi)
- Apogee altitude: 641 km (398 mi)
- Inclination: 97.9°
- Period: 97.3 minutes
Instruments
- PAN: Panchromatic Camera

Cartosat-2 was an Earth observation satellite in a Sun-synchronous orbit and the second of the Cartosat series of satellites. The satellite was built, launched and maintained by the Indian Space Research Organisation (ISRO). Weighing around 680 kilograms (1,500 lb) at launch, its applications were mainly be towards cartography. It was launched by the Polar Satellite Launch Vehicle PSLV C7 launch vehicle on 10 January 2007.

== Satellite description ==
Cartosat-2 carried a state-of-the-art panchromatic (PAN) camera that took black and white pictures of the Earth in the visible region of the electromagnetic spectrum. The swath covered by this high resolution PAN camera was 9.6 kilometres (6.0 mi) and their spatial resolution is less than 1 metre. The satellite could be steered up to 45° along as well as across the track. Cartosat-2 was an advanced remote sensing satellite capable of providing scene-specific spot imagery. The data from the satellite was used for detailed mapping and other cartographic applications at cadastral level, urban and rural infrastructure development and management, as well as applications in Land information system (LIS) and Geographic information system (GIS). The first imagery, received on 12 January 2007, covered a length of 240 kilometres (150 mi) from Paonta Sahib in Shivalik region to Delhi. Another set of imagery of about 50 kilometres (31 mi) length covered Radhanagari to Sagoan in Goa. Analysis of the first imagery received at National Remote Sensing Agency's data reception station at Shadnagar, in Hyderabad, confirmed excellent performance of the on-board camera.

Cartosat-2's panchromatic camera was able to produce images better than 1 metre (3 ft 3 in) in resolution, compared to the 82 centimetres (32 in) panchromatic resolution offered by the Ikonos satellite. India had previously purchased images from Ikonos at about US$20 per square kilometre; the use of Cartosat-2 will provide imagery at 20 times lower cost. At the time of Cartosat-2's launch, India was buying about ₹20 crore per year from Ikonos.

== End of life ==
After 12 years of service in a circular orbit of almost 630 kilometres (390 mi) altitude Cartosat-2 would have taken about 30 years to de-orbit naturally. With 25 kilograms (55 lb) of propellant remaining it was decided by ISRO's Directorate for Space Situational Awareness and Management (DSSAM) to decommission the spacecraft and lower the perigee using left-over propellant so that it meets United Nations Office for Outer Space Affairs (UNOOSA)'s space debris mitigation guidelines. Between 6 March to 3 September 2020, perigee was lowered incrementally by performing 26 perigee reduction burns putting the spacecraft in 630 by 390 kilometres (390 mi × 240 mi) orbit. This was ISRO's first low Earth orbit satellite to be decommissioned in this manner. Orbit of Cartosat-2 is expected to decay naturally within 10 years.

The satellite re-entered Earth's atmosphere and was subsequently destroyed on 14 February 2024 at 10:18 UTC over the southern Indian Ocean.

== See also ==
- Indian military satellites
- List of Indian satellites
